= List of butterflies of India =

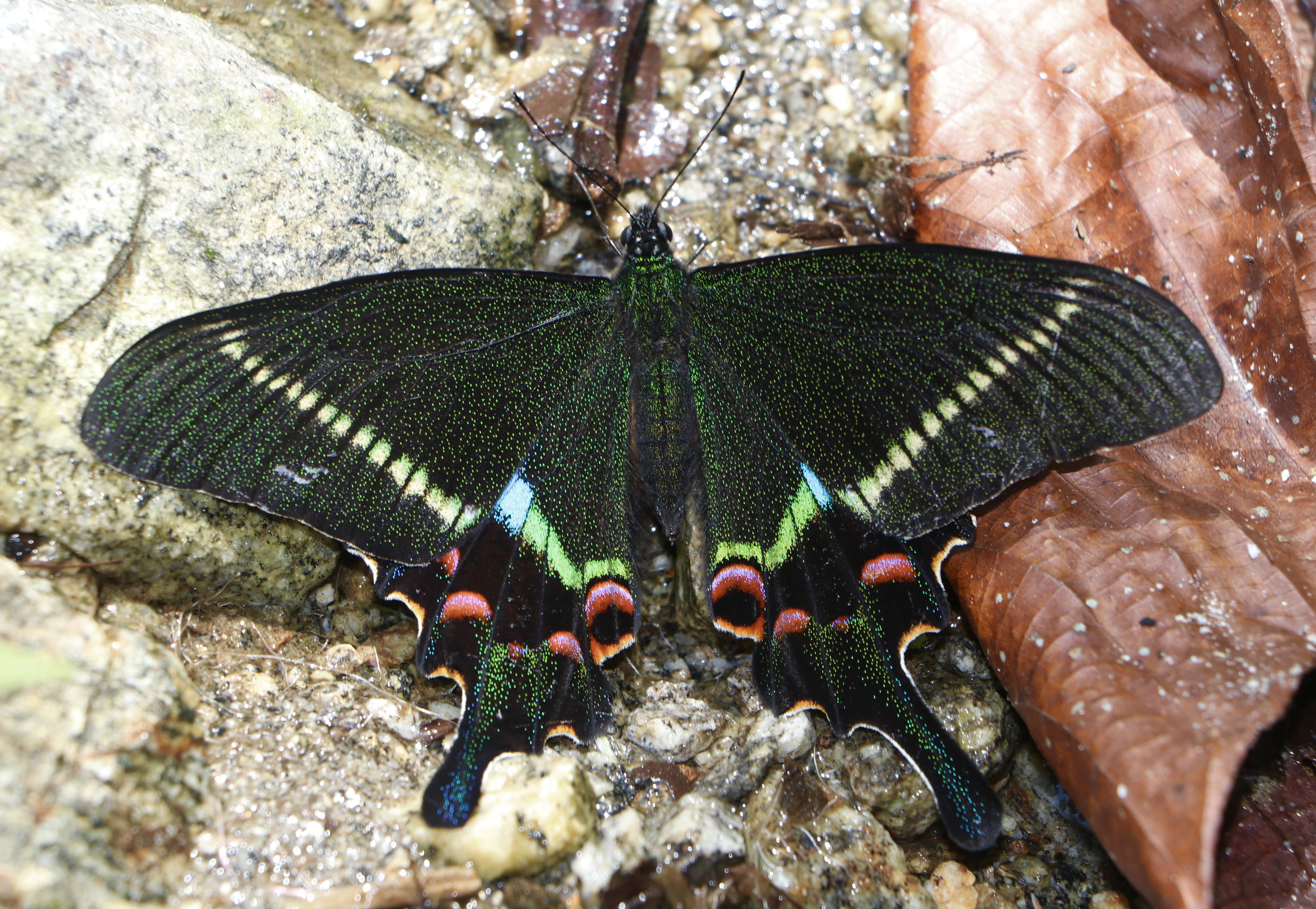
Krishna peacock (Papilio krishna). Voted as the national butterfly of India as well as the most beautiful Indian butterfly. (Note: This butterfly received the most votes out of the seven options in the citizen poll. It is not officially the National Butterfly of India.)

The following is a list of the butterflies of India.

India has extremely diverse terrain, climate and vegetation, which comprises extremes of heat and cold, desert and jungle, of low-lying plains and the highest mountains, of dryness and dampness, islands and continental areas, widely varying flora, and sharply marked seasons. India forms a large part of the Indomalayan biogeographical zone; many of the floral and faunal forms show Malayan affinities with some taxa being unique to the Indian region. In addition, India hosts three of the world's biodiversity hotspots: the Western Ghats, the Himalayas, and the hilly ranges bordering India and Myanmar, each having numerous endemic species. Accordingly, India's diverse and varied fauna include a rich variety of butterflies and moths. Brigadier William Harry Evans recorded approximately 1439 species of butterfly from British India, including Ceylon and Burma. After 1947, the rise of several new nations led to a reduction of the area forming part of India proper, and the number of species has been noted to be 1418 species.

Many papers and books have been written on Indian butterflies, some of the most famous are the Synoptic Catalogue of the Butterflies of India and The Book of Indian Butterflies.

Here is a key to the terms used in this list-

1. Endemic: Endemic species are species found only in a particular region, in this case, India.
2. Schedule 1: This is used on all species under Schedule 1 of the Wildlife Protection Act (Amendment 2022).
3. Schedule 2: This is used on all species under Schedule 2 of the Wildlife Protection Act (Amendment 2022).

== History of studies on butterflies in India ==
The first book to deal with Indian butterflies was The Butterflies of India, Burmah and Ceylon by Lionel de Nicéville and G. F. L. Marshall, followed shortly after with Lepidoptera Indica by Frederic Moore.

From the 1920 to the 1960s, two major books on Indian butterflies were published. These were The Identification of Indian Butterflies by William Harry Evans and Butterflies of the Indian Region by Mark Alexander Wynter-Blyth.

In recent times, field guides like Butterflies of India by Isaac Kehimkar and A Naturalist's Guide to the Butterflies of India, Pakistan, Nepal, Bhutan, Bangladesh and Sri Lanka by Peter Smetacek helped in spreading popularity on butterfly watching and identification.

The Synoptic Catalogue of the Butterflies of India by R. K. Varshney and Peter Smetacek provided the first complete list of the butterflies found in India.

== Papilionidae ==
The Papilionidae or the swallowtail butterflies are a family of about 550 species. Many species show sexual dimorphism. Males of this family are attracted to wet mud (this behavior is called mud-puddling). The swallowtail butterflies have three well-developed pairs of legs and the abdomen is not covered by the wing. There are 96 species of this family found in India.

=== Papilioninae ===
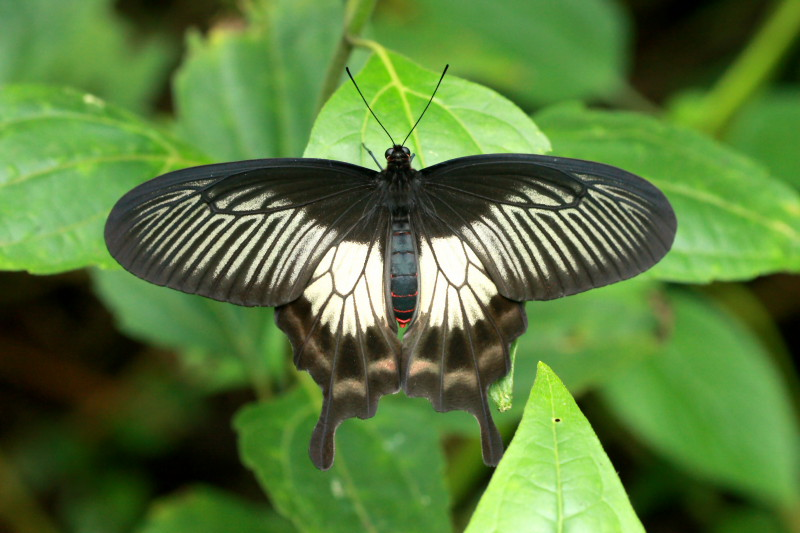
Malabar rose, Pachliopta pandiyana

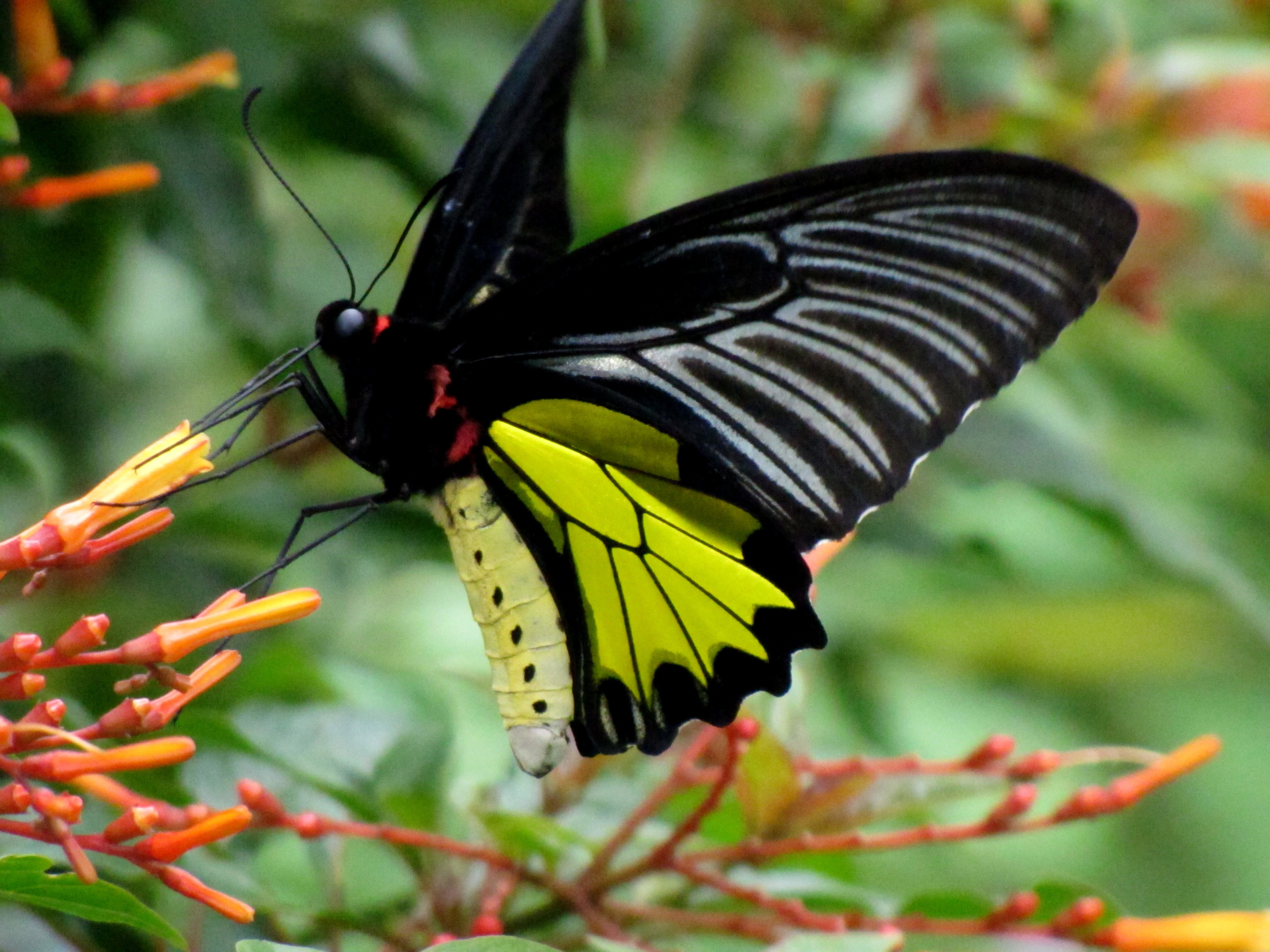
Southern birdwing, Troides minos

==== Troidini ====
| Common name | Binomial name | Subspecies (in India) | Comments |
|---|---|---|---|
| Common clubtail | Losaria doubledayi | 2 | Schedule 1 |
| Andaman clubtail | Losaria rhodifer | | Endemic |
| Common rose | Pachliopta aristolochiae | 5 | |
| Crimson rose | Pachliopta hector | | Schedule 2 |
| Malabar rose | Pachliopta pandiyana | | Endemic |
| Golden birdwing | Troides aeacus | 1 | Schedule 2 |
| Common birdwing | Troides helena | 3 | |
| Southern birdwing | Troides minos | | Schedule 2, Endemic |
| Lesser batwing | Atrophaneura aidoneus | | |
| Common batwing | Atrophaneura astorion | 1 | |
| Black windmill | Byasa crassipes | | Schedule 1 |
| Great windmill | Byasa dasarada | 2 | |
| Rose windmill | Byasa latreillei | 2 | Schedule 2 |
| Nevill's windmill | Byasa nevilli | | Schedule 1 |
| Chinese windmill | Byasa plutonius | 2 | Schedule 1, Schedule 2 |
| De Nicéville's windmill | Byasa polla | | Schedule 1 |
| Common windmill | Byasa polyeuctes | 2 | |

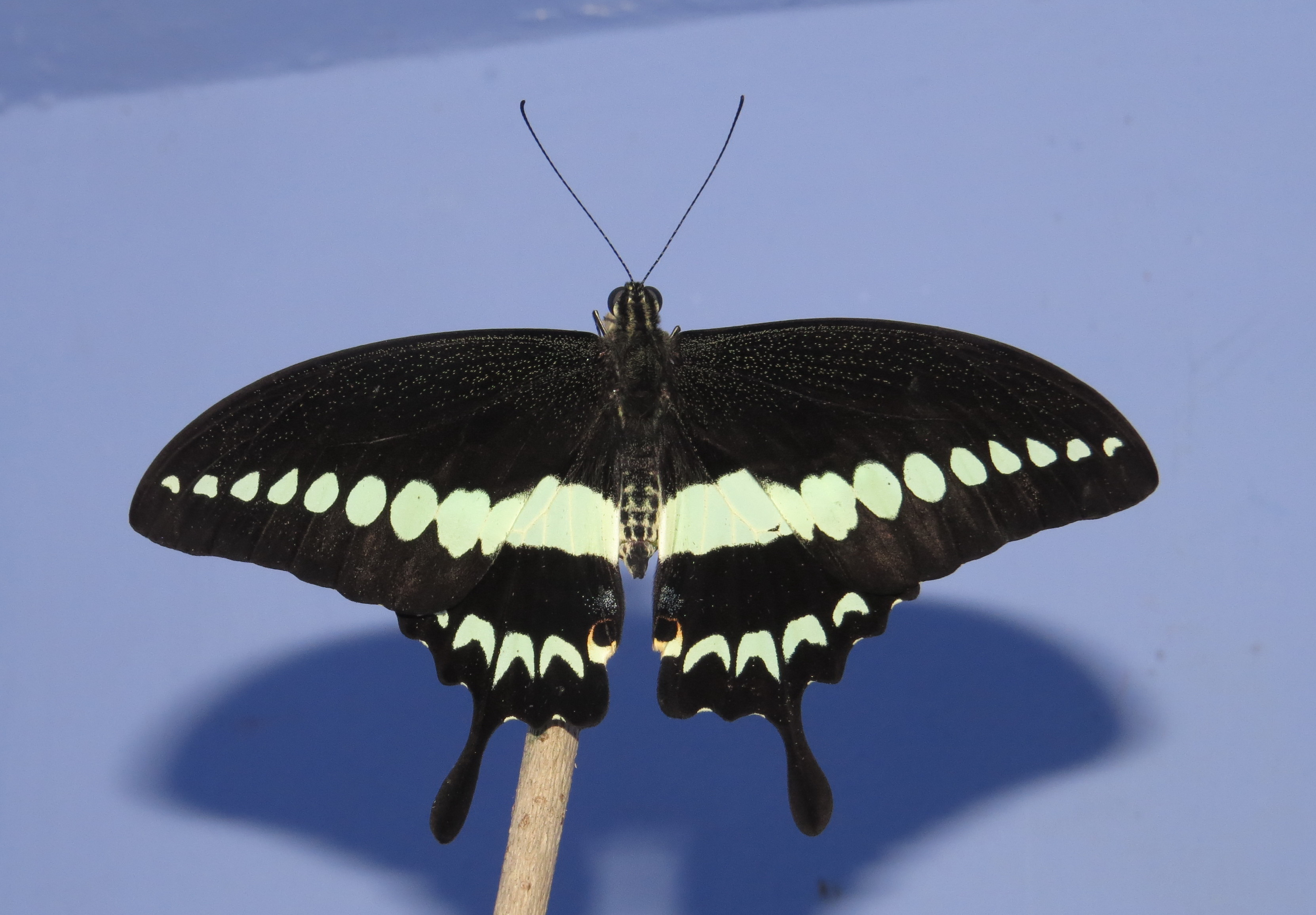
Malabar banded swallowtail, Papilio liomedon

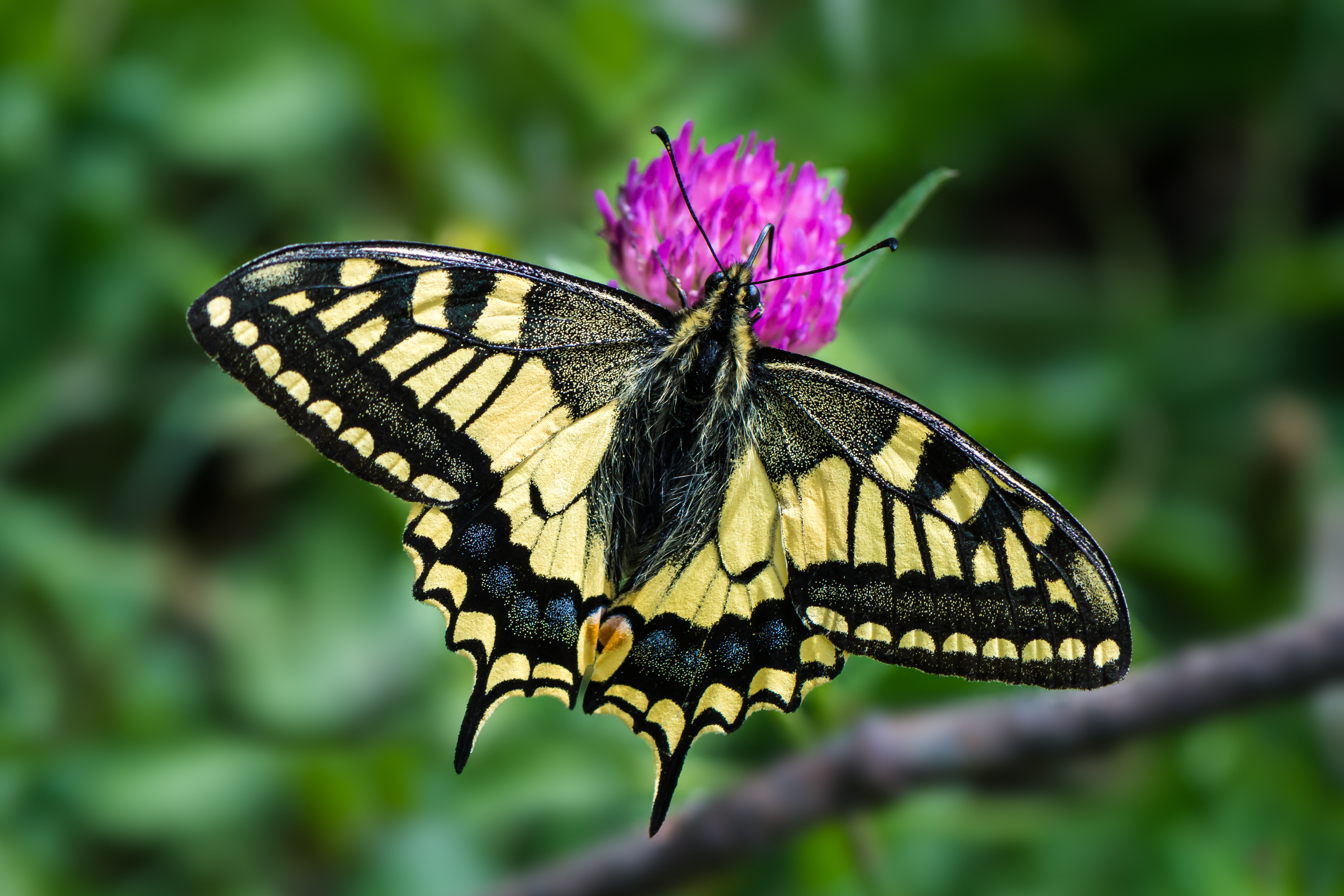
Common yellow swallowtail, Papilio machaon

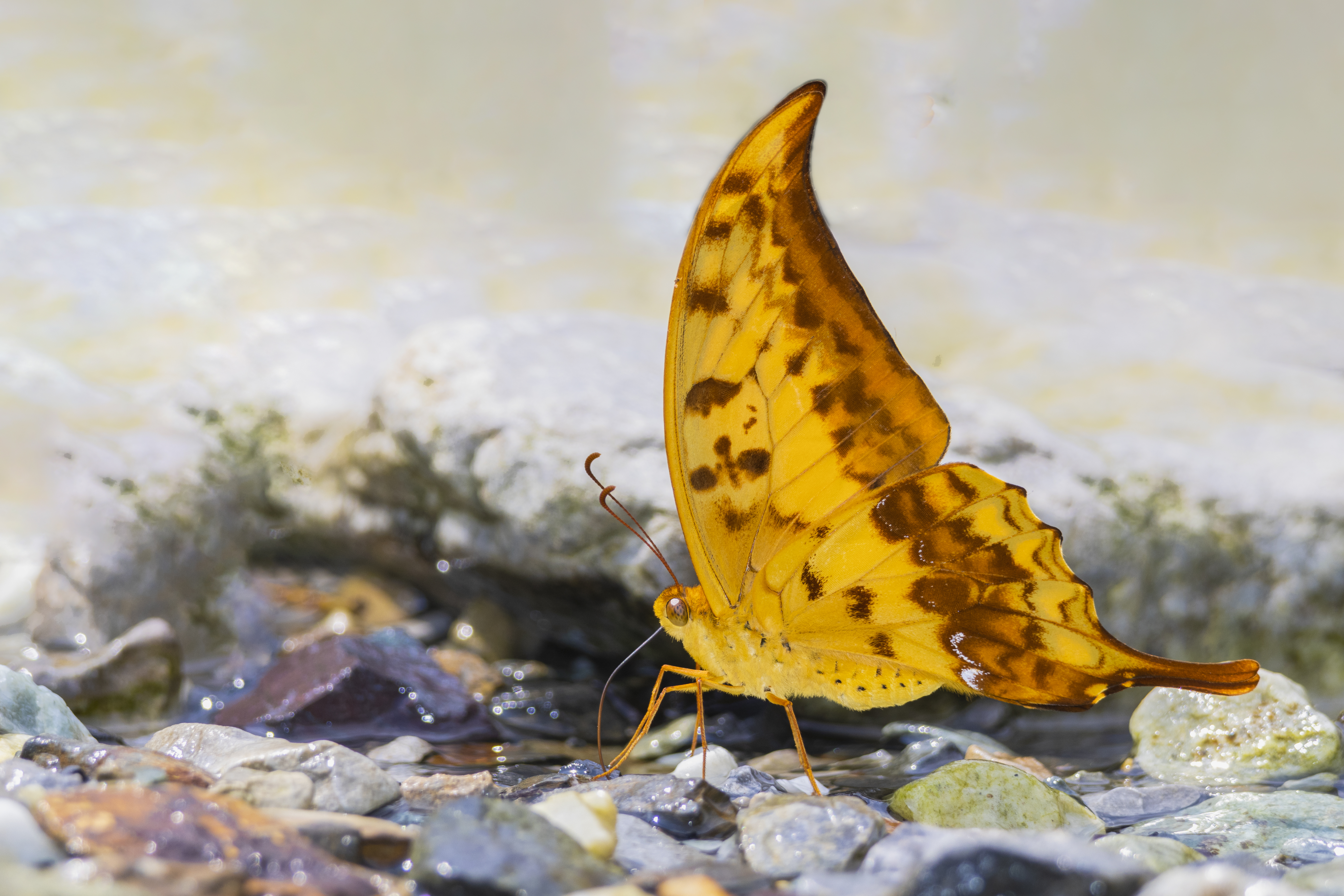
Yellow gorgon, Meandrusa payeni

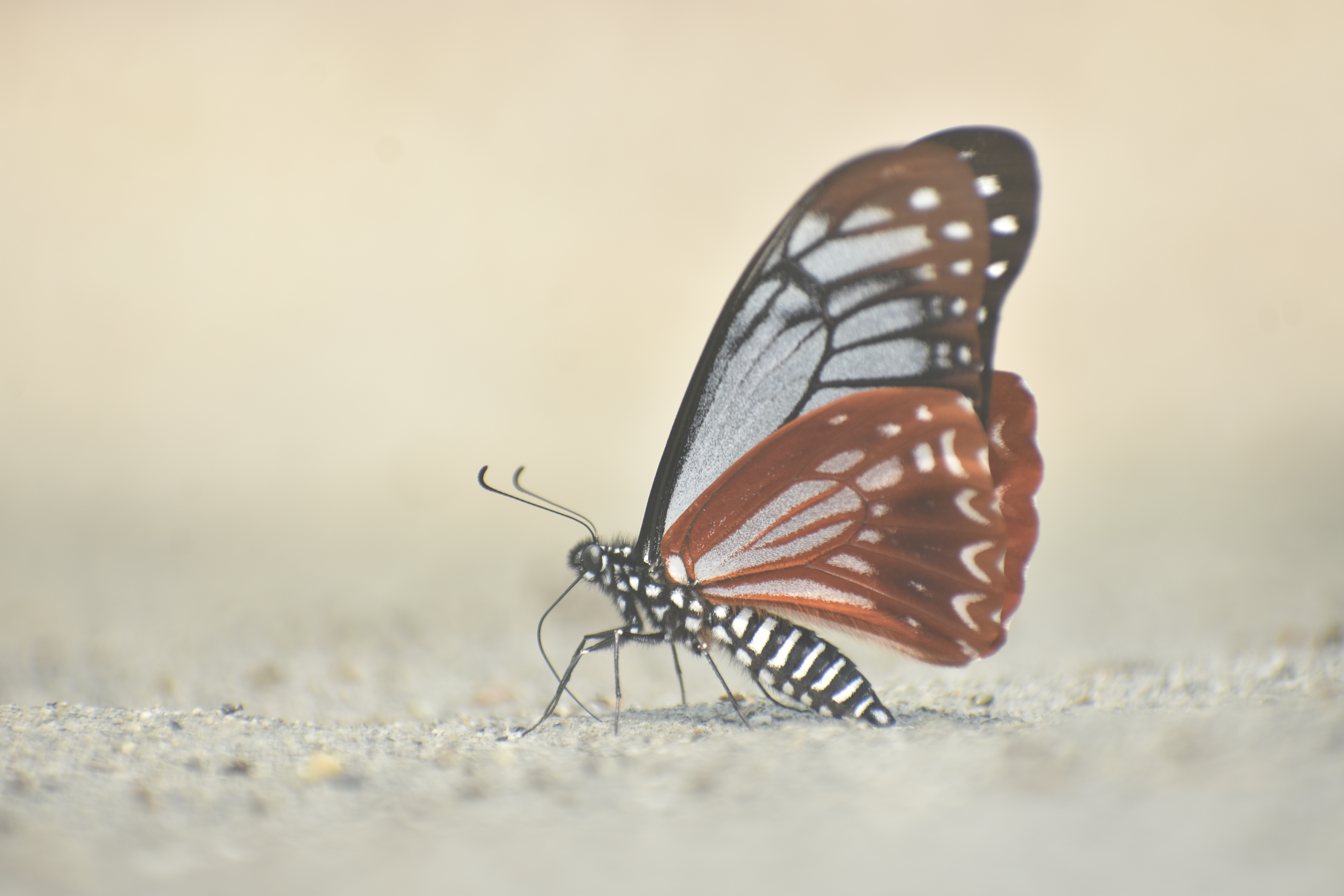
Tawny mime, Papilio agestor

==== Papilionini ====
| Common name | Binomial name | Subspecies (in India) | Comments |
|---|---|---|---|
| Grand mormon | Papilio agenor | 3 | Schedule 2 |
| Tawny mime | Papilio agestor | 2 | |
| Redbreast | Papilio alcmenor | 1 | |
| Blue peacock | Papilio arcturus | 2 | |
| Chinese peacock | Papilio bianor | 2 | |
| Tailed redbreast | Papilio bootes | 2 | Schedule 2 |
| Malabar banded peacock | Papilio buddha | | Schedule 2, Endemic |
| Common raven | Papilio castor | 2 | |
| Yellow helen | Papilio chaon | 1 | |
| Common mime | Papilio clytia | 2 | Schedule 2 |
| Common banded peacock | Papilio crino | | Schedule 2 |
| Indian helen | Papilio daksha | 1 | |
| Lime swallowtail | Papilio demoleus | 1 | |
| Malabar raven | Papilio dravidarum | | Endemic |
| Yellow-crested spangle | Papilio elephenor | | Schedule 1 |
| Lesser mime | Papilio epycides | 1 | Schedule 2 |
| Everest yellow swallowtail | Papilio everesti | 1 | |
| Red helen | Papilio helenus | 1 | |
| Western tailed redbreast | Papilio janaka | | |
| Krishna peacock | Papilio krishna | 2 | Schedule 1 |
| Malabar banded swallowtail | Papilio liomedon | | Schedule 1, Endemic |
| Common yellow swallowtail | Papilio machaon | 3 | Schedule 2 |
| Great mormon | Papilio memnon | 1 | |
| Noble's helen | Papilio noblei | | |
| Green-banded peacock | Papilio palinurus | 1 | A vagrant to West Bengal |
| Great blue mime | Papilio paradoxa | 1 | Schedule 2 |
| Paris peacock | Papilio paris | 2 | |
| Common peacock | Papilio polyctor | | |
| Common mormon | Papilio polytes | 3 | |
| Blue helen | Papilio prexaspes | 1 | |
| Spangle | Papilio protenor | 1 | |
| Blue-striped mime | Papilio slateri | 1 | Schedule 2 |
| Eastern yellow swallowtail | Papilio verityi | | |
| Chinese yellow swallowtail | Papilio xuthus | | |
| Brown gorgon | Meandrusa lachinus | 1 | Schedule 2 |
| Yellow gorgon | Meandrusa payeni | 1 | |

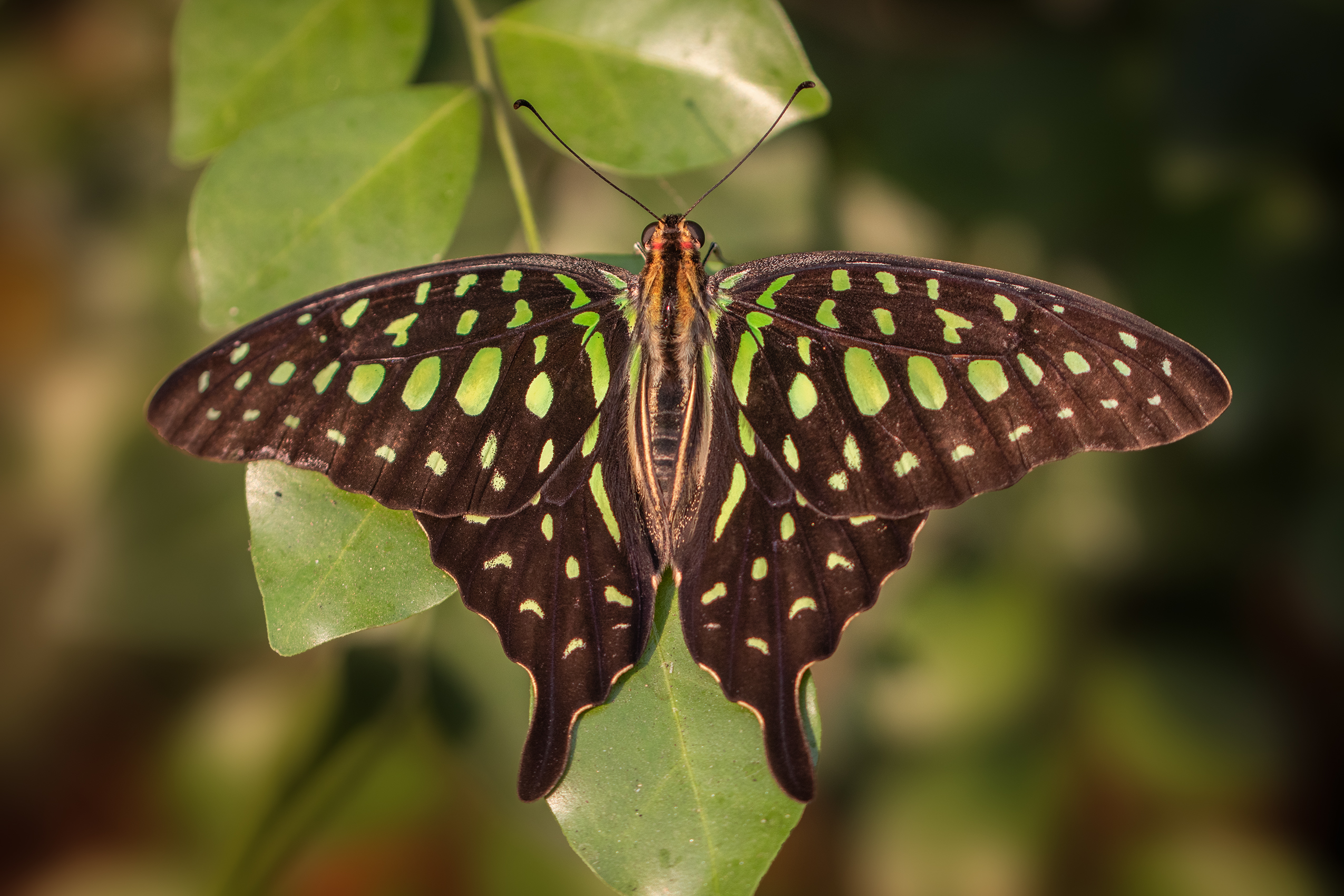
Tailed jay, Graphium agamemnon

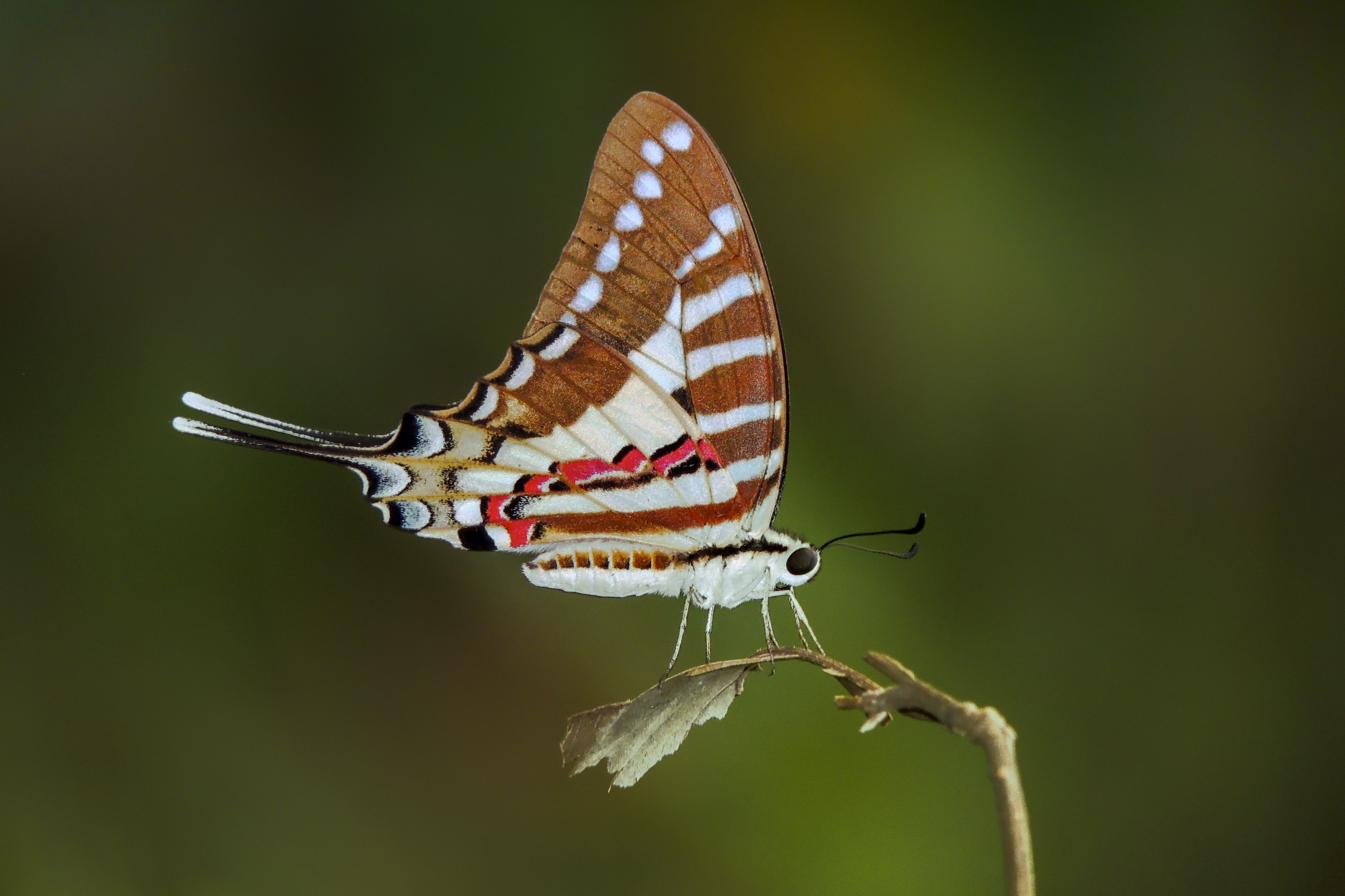
Spot swordtail, Graphium nomius

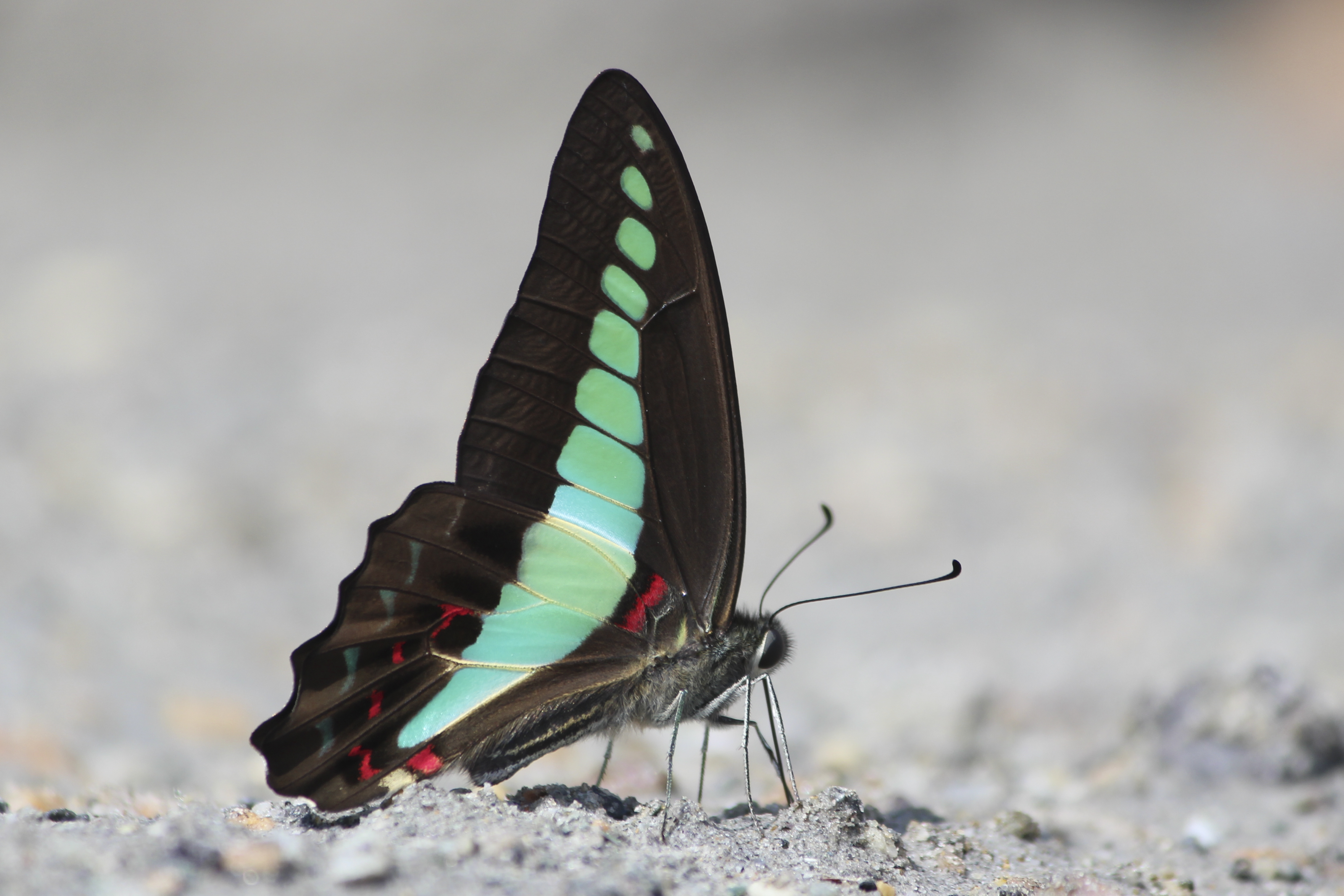
Common bluebottle, Graphium sarpedon

==== Leptocircini ====
| Common name | Binomial name | Subspecies (in India) | Comments |
|---|---|---|---|
| Tailed jay | Graphium agamemnon | 5 | |
| Fourbar swallowtail | Graphium agetes | 1 | Schedule 2 |
| Scarce jay | Graphium albociliatus | | Schedule 2 |
| Fivebar swordtail | Graphium antiphates | 2 | |
| Chain swordtail | Graphium aristeus | 1 | Schedule 2 |
| Spotted jay (Note: Probably does not occur in India, see Synoptic Catalogue of the Butterflies of India, Second Edition, pg 228) | Graphium arycles | | Schedule 2 |
| Veined jay | Graphium chironides | 1 | |
| Glassy bluebottle | Graphium cloanthus | 1 | Schedule 2 |
| Common jay | Graphium doson | 2 | |
| Andaman swordtail | Graphium epaminondas | | Endemic |
| Sixbar swordtail | Graphium eurous | 2 | |
| Great jay | Graphium eurypylus | 2 | Schedule 2 |
| Western spectacle swordtail | Graphium garhwalica | | |
| Lesser zebra | Graphium macareus | 2 | |
| Spotted zebra | Graphium megarus | 1 | Schedule 2 |
| Spot swordtail | Graphium nomius | 2 | |
| Indian spectacle swordtail | Graphium paphus | | |
| Common bluebottle | Graphium sarpedon | 1 | |
| Cryptic bluebottle | Graphium septentrionicolus | | |
| Southern bluebottle | Graphium teredon | | |
| Great zebra | Graphium xenocles | 2 | |
| White dragontail | Lamproptera curius | 1 | |
| Green dragontail | Lamproptera meges | 1 | Schedule 2 |

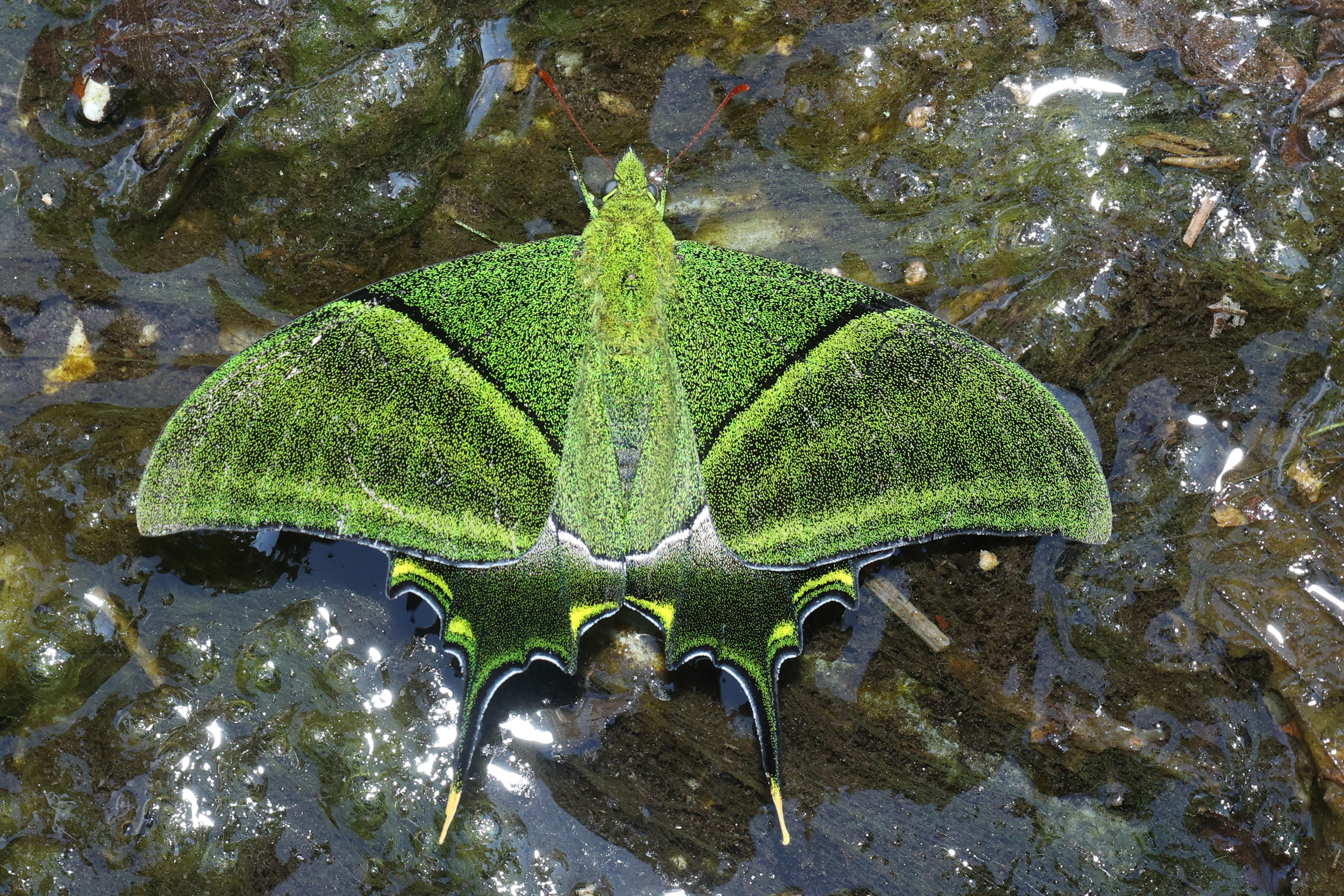
Kaiser-i-hind, Teinopalpus imperialis

==== Teinopalpini ====
| Common name | Binomial name | Subspecies (in India) | Comments |
|---|---|---|---|
| Kaiser-i-hind | Teinopalpus imperialis | 2 | Schedule 1 |

=== Parnassiinae ===
==== Sericinini ====
| Common name | Binomial name | Subspecies (in India) | Comments |
|---|---|---|---|
| Bhutan glory | Bhutanitis lidderdalii | 1 | Schedule 1 |
| Ludlow's Bhutan glory | Bhutanitis ludlowi | | Schedule 1 |

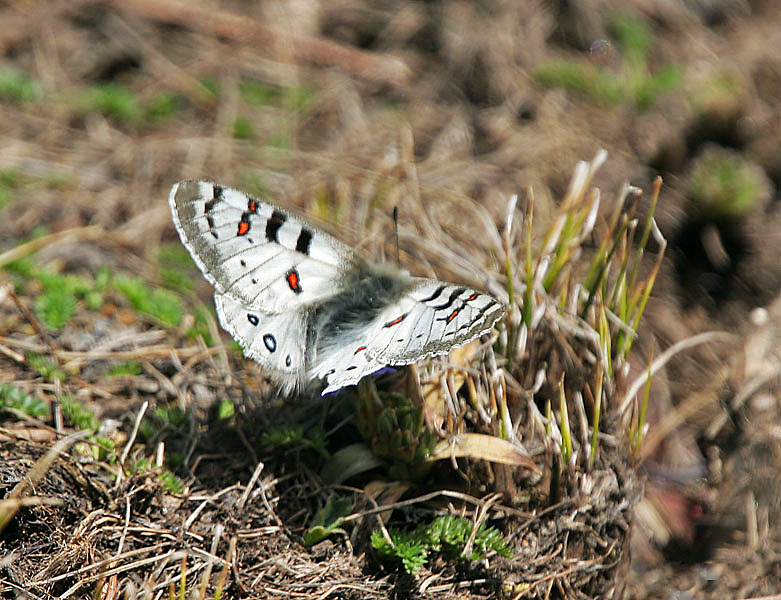
Common blue apollo, Parnassius hardwickii

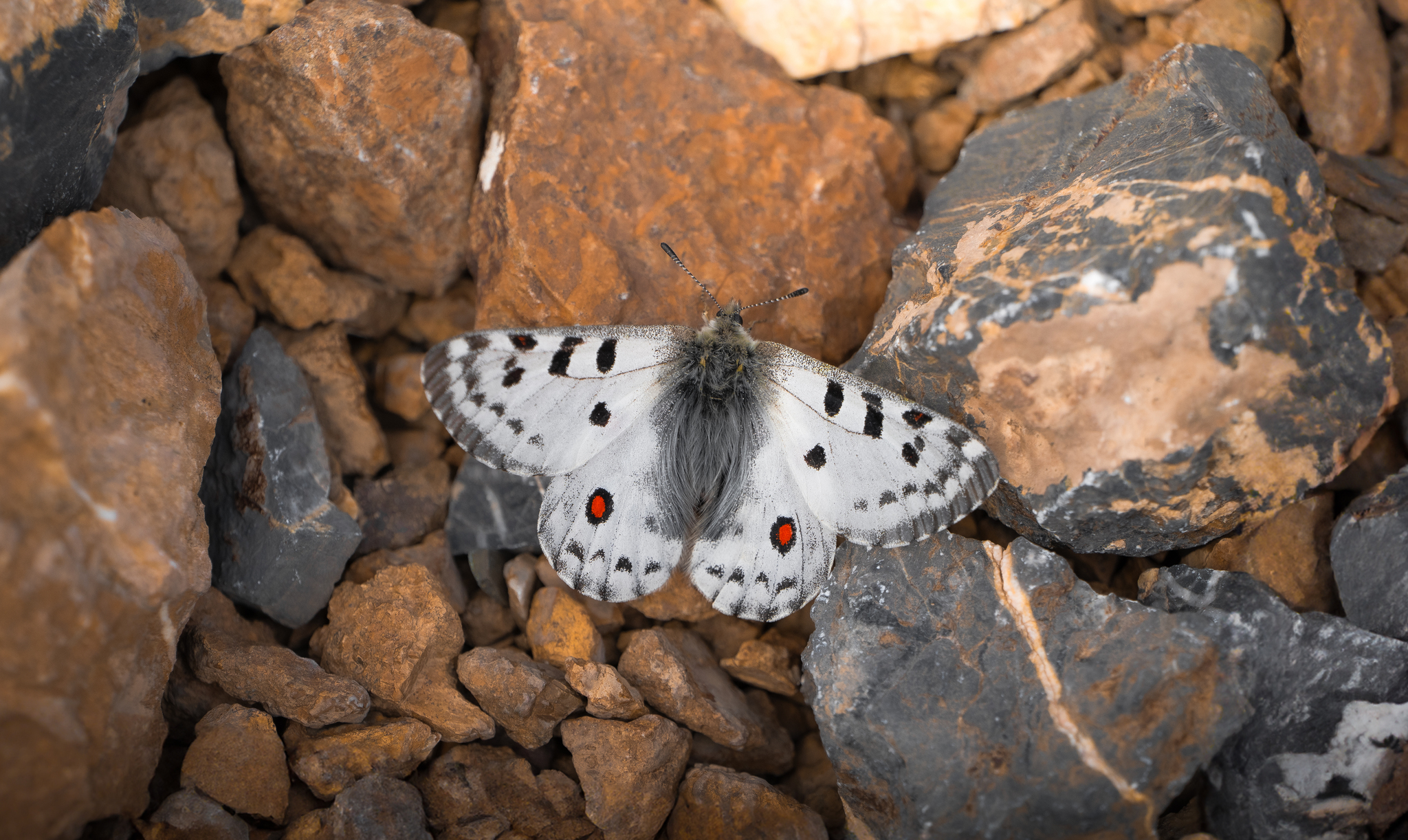
Scarce red apollo, Parnassius actius

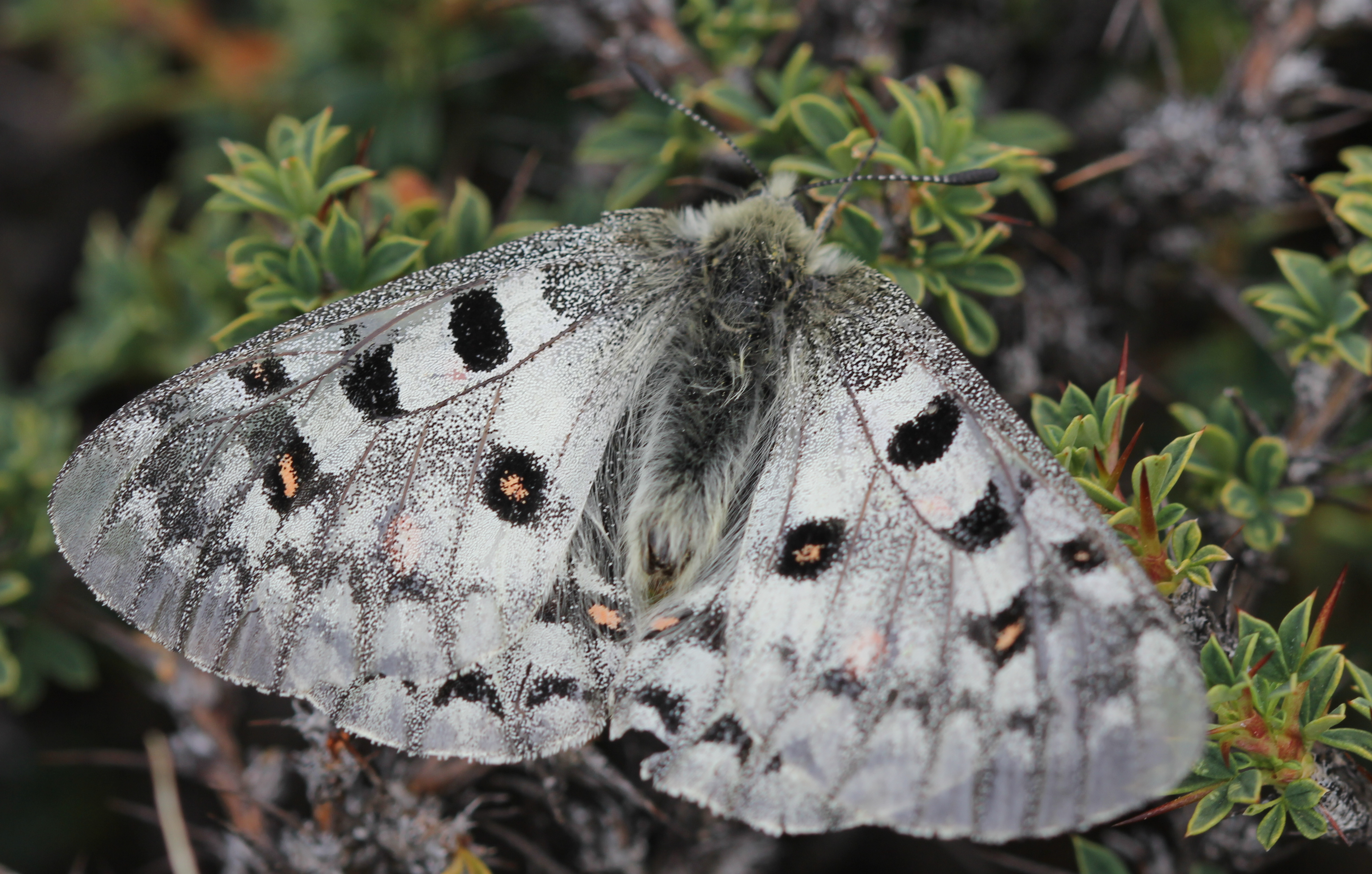
Common red apollo, Parnassius epaphus

==== Parnassiini ====
| Common name | Binomial name | Subspecies (in India) | Comments |
|---|---|---|---|
| Varnished apollo | Parnassius acco | 4 | Schedule 1 |
| Dusky apollo | Parnassius acdestis | 4 | |
| Scarce red apollo | Parnassius actius | 3 | |
| Noble apollo | Parnassius augustus | | |
| Regal apollo | Parnassius charltonius | 9 | Schedule 2 |
| Common red apollo | Parnassius epaphus | 9 | Schedule 2 |
| Common blue apollo | Parnassius hardwickii | | |
| Karakoram banded apollo | Parnassius hunza | 2 | |
| Keeled apollo | Parnassius jacquemontii | 5 | Schedule 2 |
| Himalayan banded apollo | Parnassius kumaonensis | 2 | P. nandadevinensis is merged here. |
| Stately apollo | Parnassius loxias | 1 | |
| Royal apollo | Parnassius maharaja | 1 | |
| Scarce banded apollo | Parnassius mamaievi | 3 | |
| Black-edged apollo | Parnassius simo | 7 | |
| Greater banded apollo | Parnassius stenosemus | 6 | |
| Lesser banded apollo | Parnassius stoliczkanus | 5 | Schedule 1 |
| Large keeled apollo | Parnassius tianshanica | 1 | |

== Hesperiidae ==
The Hesperiidae or the skipper butterflies are a family of about 3500 species. Many members of this family are hard to distinguish from each other and require dissection to properly identify. They are called "skippers" due to their quick and darting flights. There are 297 species of this family found in India.

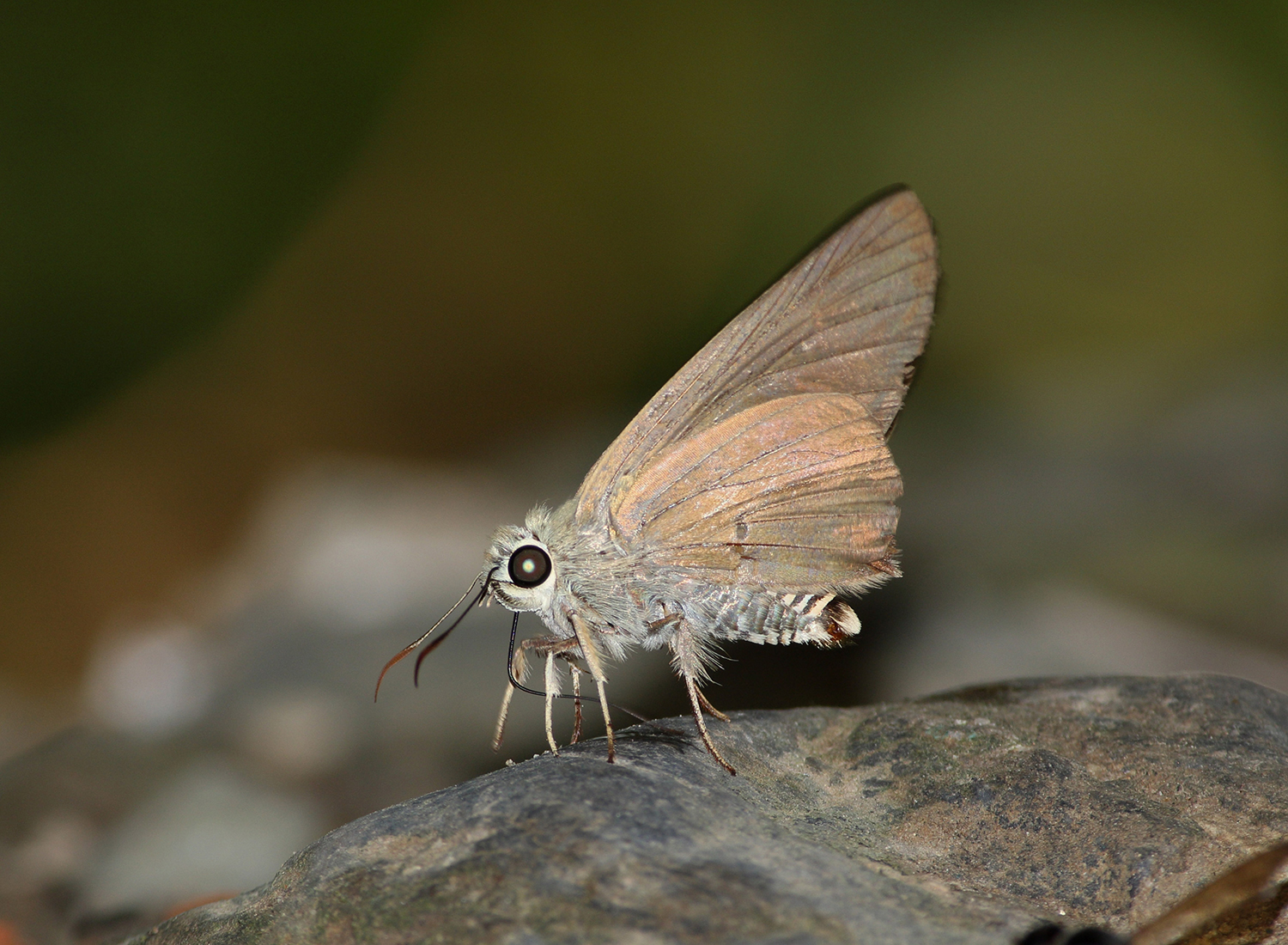
Brown awl, Badamia exclamationis

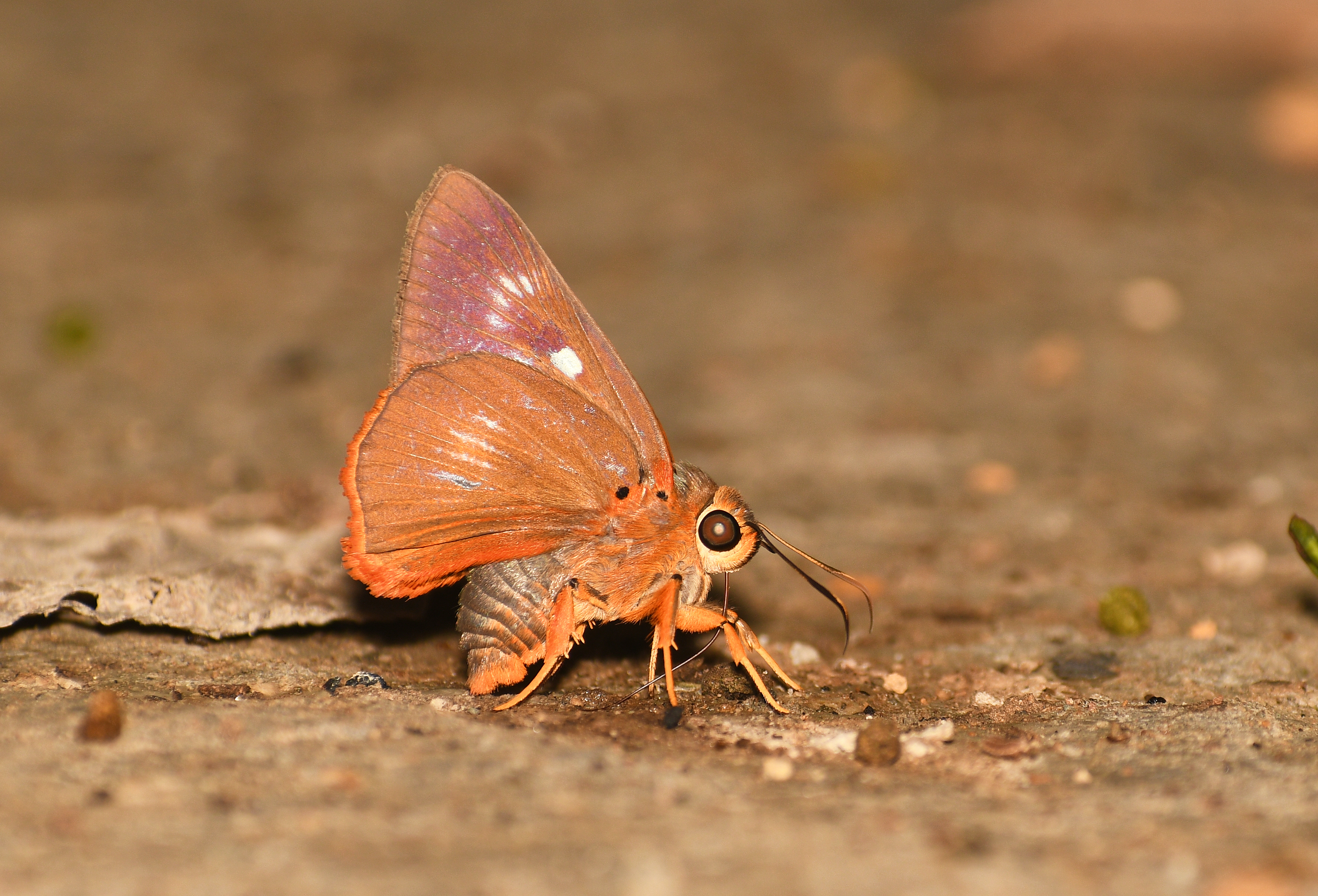
Common orange awlet, Burara jaina

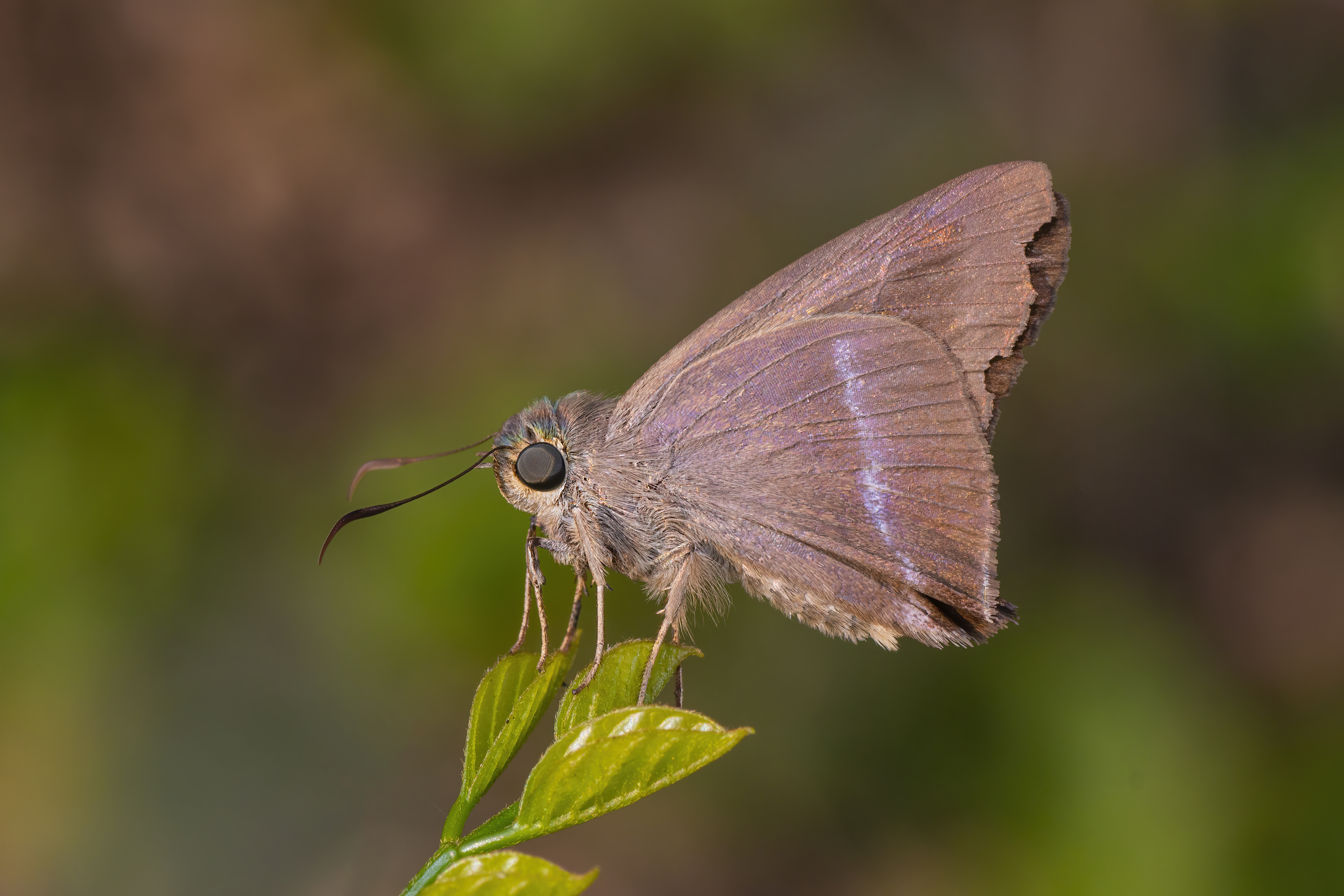
Common banded awl, Hasora chromus

=== Coeliadinae ===
| Common name | Binomial name | Subspecies (in India) | Comments |
|---|---|---|---|
| Brown awl | Badamia exclamationis | | |
| Indian awlking | Choaspes benjaminii | 2 | |
| Hooded awlking | Choaspes furcata | | |
| Branded awlking | Choaspes stigmata | 1 | |
| Similar awlking | Choaspes xanthopogon | 1 | |
| Slate awlet | Bibasis mahintha | | |
| Orange-tailed awlet | Bibasis sena | 1 | Schedule 2 |
| Small green awlet | Burara amara | | |
| Plain orange awlet | Burara anadi | | |
| Light-colored awlet | Burara danata | | |
| Great orange awlet | Burara etelka | | |
| Pale green awlet | Burara gomata | 2 | |
| Orange striped awlet | Burara harisa | 2 | |
| Common orange awlet | Burara jaina | 3 | |
| Branded orange awlet | Burara oedipodea | 1 | |
| Green awlet | Burara vasutana | | |
| Slate awl | Hasora anura | 1 | |
| Common awl | Hasora badra | 1 | |
| Common banded awl | Hasora chromus | 1 | |
| Purple awl | Hasora danda | | |
| Large banded awl | Hasora khoda | 1 | |
| Violet awl | Hasora leucospila | | |
| Green awl | Hasora salanga | | |
| Yellow banded awl | Hasora schoenherr | 1 | |
| White-banded awl | Hasora taminatus | 4 | |
| Plain banded awl | Hasora vitta | 2 | |

=== Eudaminae ===
==== Eudamini ====
| Common name | Binomial name | Subspecies (in India) | Comments |
|---|---|---|---|
| Marbled flat | Lobocla liliana | 3 | |

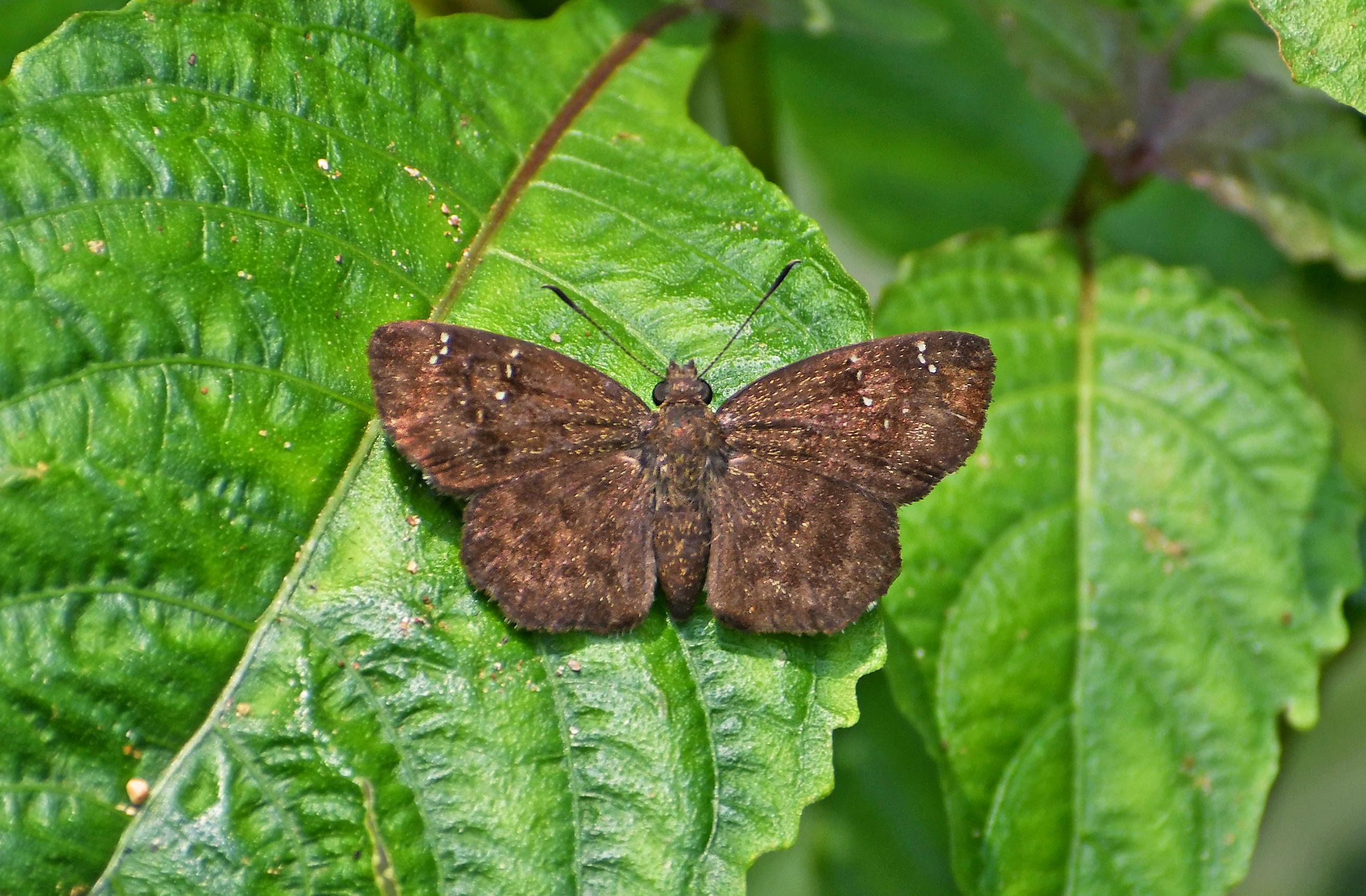
Common small flat, Sarangesa dasahara

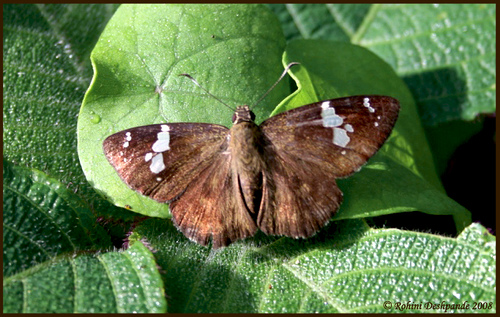
Tamil spotted flat, Celaenorrhinus ruficornis

=== Tagiadinae ===
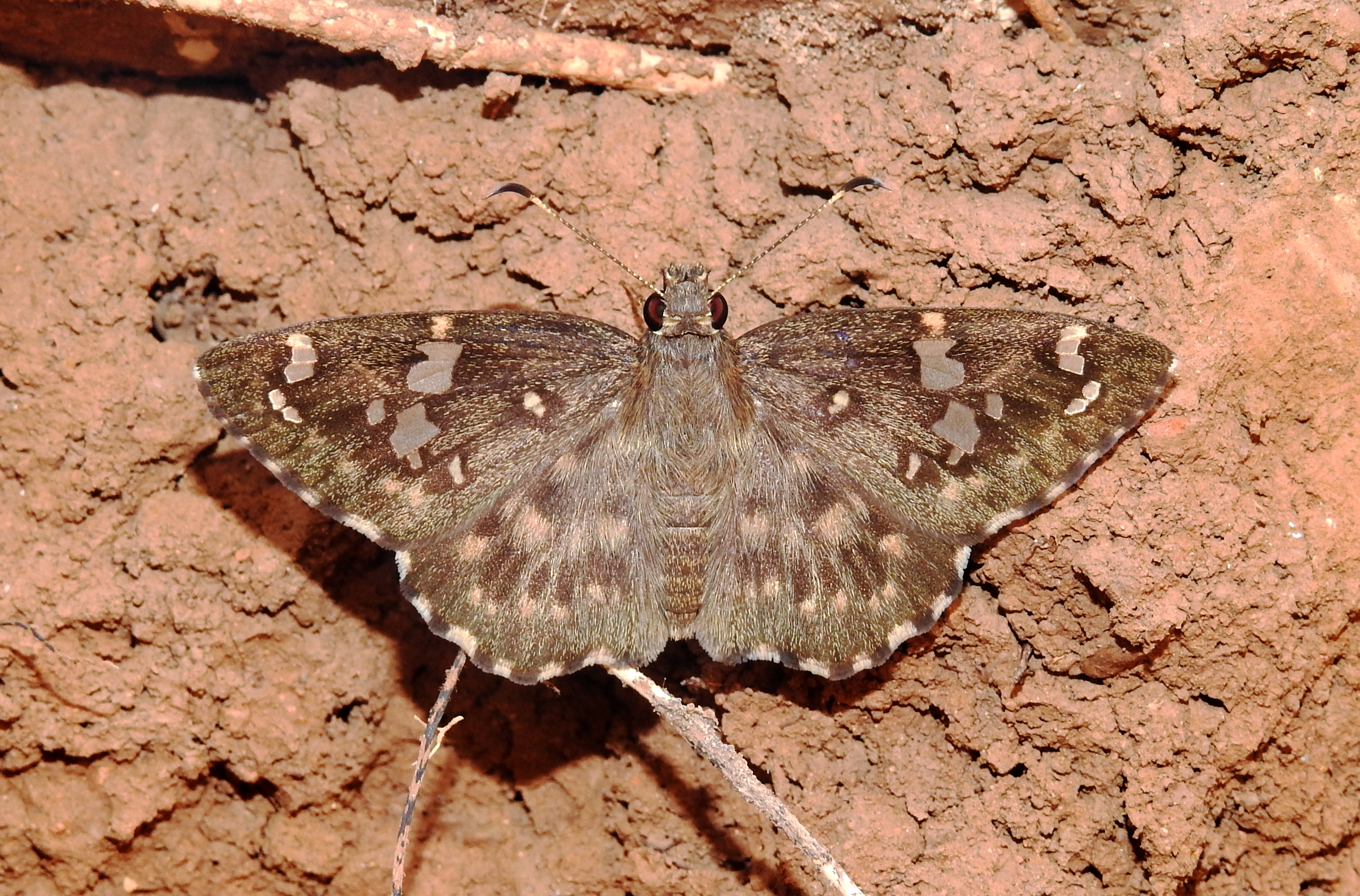
Malabar flat, Celaenorrhinus ambareesa

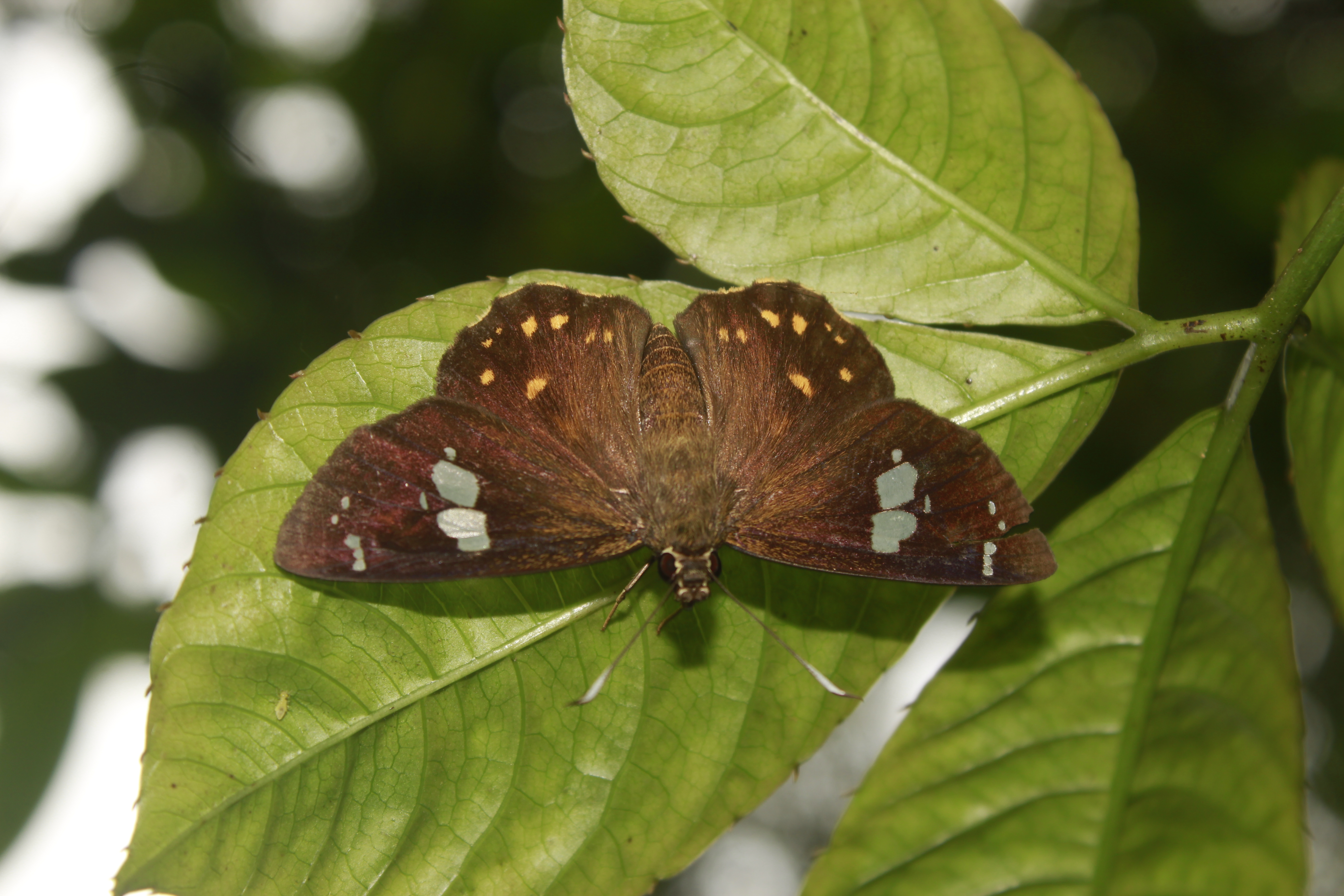
Mussoorie spotted flat, Celaenorrhinus pero

==== Celaenorrhinini ====
| Common name | Binomial name | Subspecies (in India) | Comments |
|---|---|---|---|
| Common small flat | Sarangesa dasahara | 4 | |
| Spotted small flat | Sarangesa purendra | 4 | |
| Fulvous pied flat | Pseudocoladenia dan | | |
| Indented pied flat | Pseudocoladenia fabia | | |
| West Himalayan pied flat | Pseudocoladenia fatih | | |
| Sikkim pied flat | Pseudocoladenia fatua | | |
| Naga pied flat | Pseudocoladenia festa | | |
| Khasi yellow-banded flat | Celaenorrhinus affinis | | |
| Malabar flat | Celaenorrhinus ambareesa | | Endemic |
| Andaman yellow-banded flat | Celaenorrhinus andamanicus | 2 | |
| White-banded flat | Celaenorrhinus asmara | 1 | |
| Large-streaked flat | Celaenorrhinus aspersa | 1 | |
| Scarce banded flat | Celaenorrhinus badia | | |
| Himalayan yellow-banded flat | Celaenorrhinus dhanada | 1 | |
| Buxa flat | Celaenorrhinus flavocincta | | |
| Common spotted flat | Celaenorrhinus leucocera | | |
| Evans' spotted flat | Celaenorrhinus morena | | |
| Himalayan spotted flat | Celaenorrhinus munda | 2 | |
| Small banded flat | Celaenorrhinus nigricans | 1 | |
| Large-spotted flat | Celaenorrhinus patula | | |
| Mussoorie spotted flat | Celaenorrhinus pero | 2 | |
| De Nicéville's spotted flat | Celaenorrhinus plagifera | | |
| Multi-spotted flat | Celaenorrhinus pulomaya | 1 | |
| Bengal spotted flat | Celaenorrhinus putra | 1 | |
| Double-spotted flat | Celaenorrhinus pyrrha | | |
| Tytler's multi-spotted flat | Celaenorrhinus ratna | 2 | |
| Tamil spotted flat | Celaenorrhinus ruficornis | 1 | |
| Moore's spotted flat | Celaenorrhinus sumitra | | |
| Tibet flat | Celaenorrhinus tibetana | | |
| Swinhoe's flat | Celaenorrhinus zea | | |
| Dark yellow-banded flat | Aurivittia aurivittia | | |

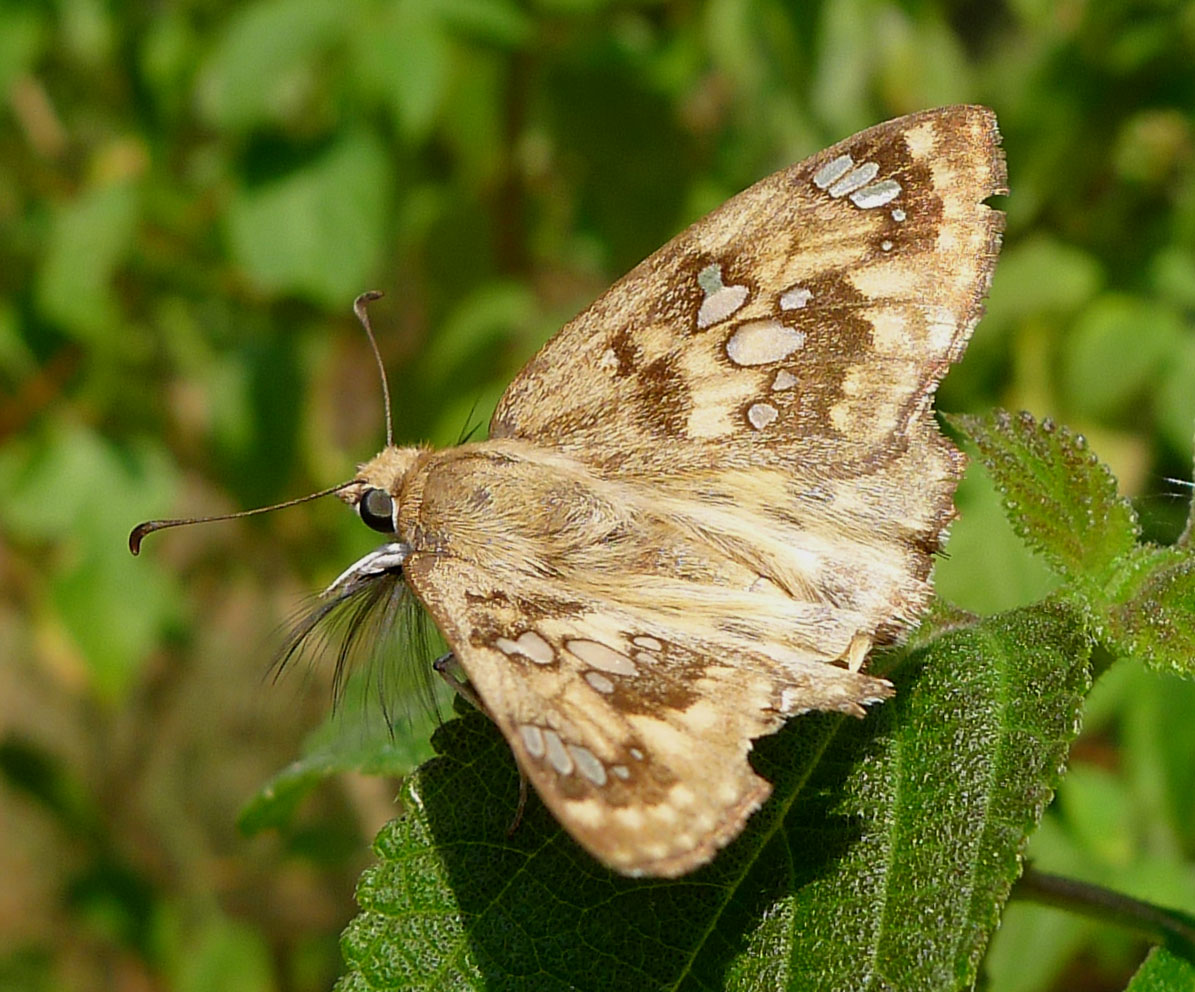
Golden angle, Abaratha ransonnetti

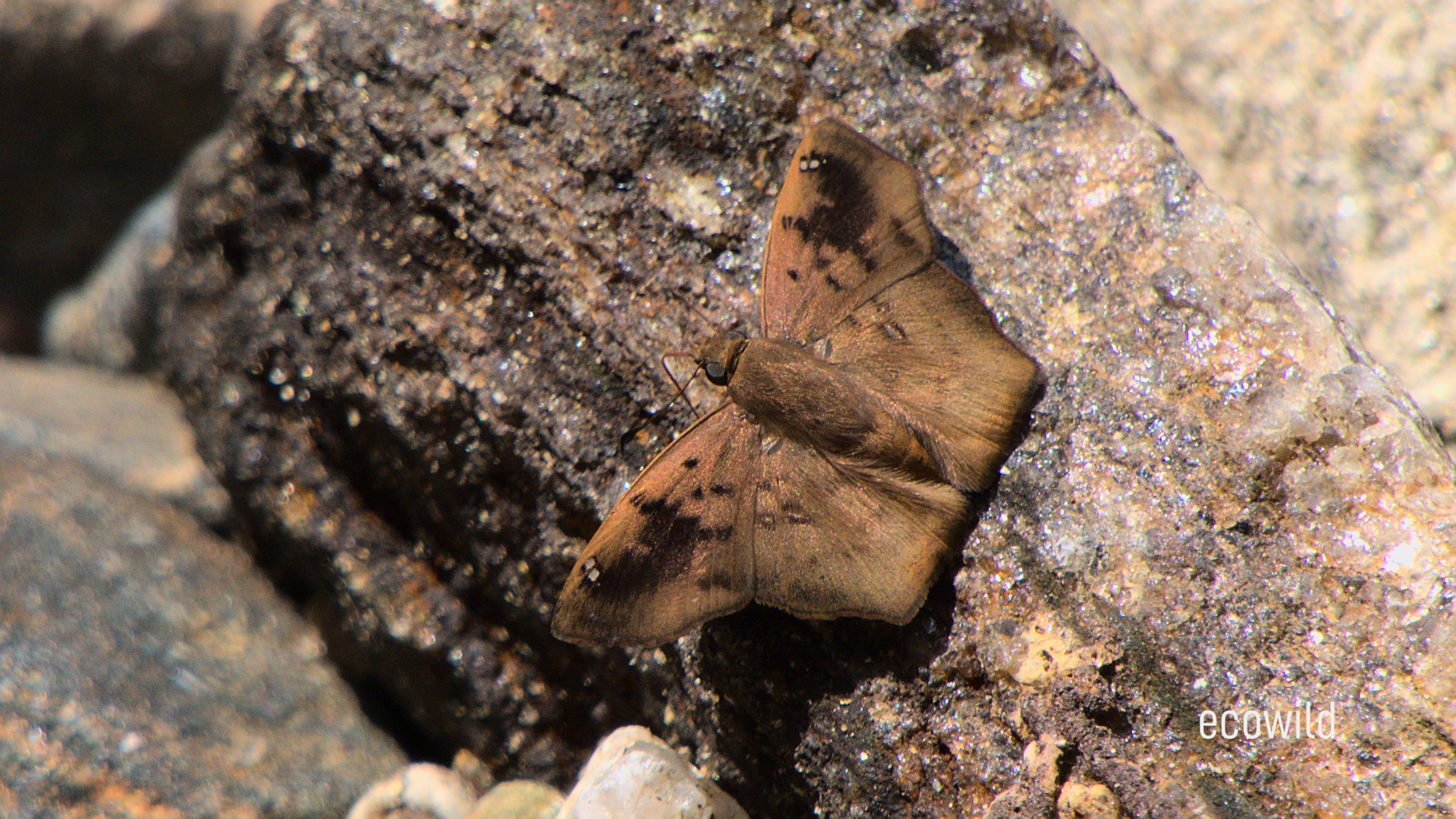
Black angle, Tapena thwaitesi

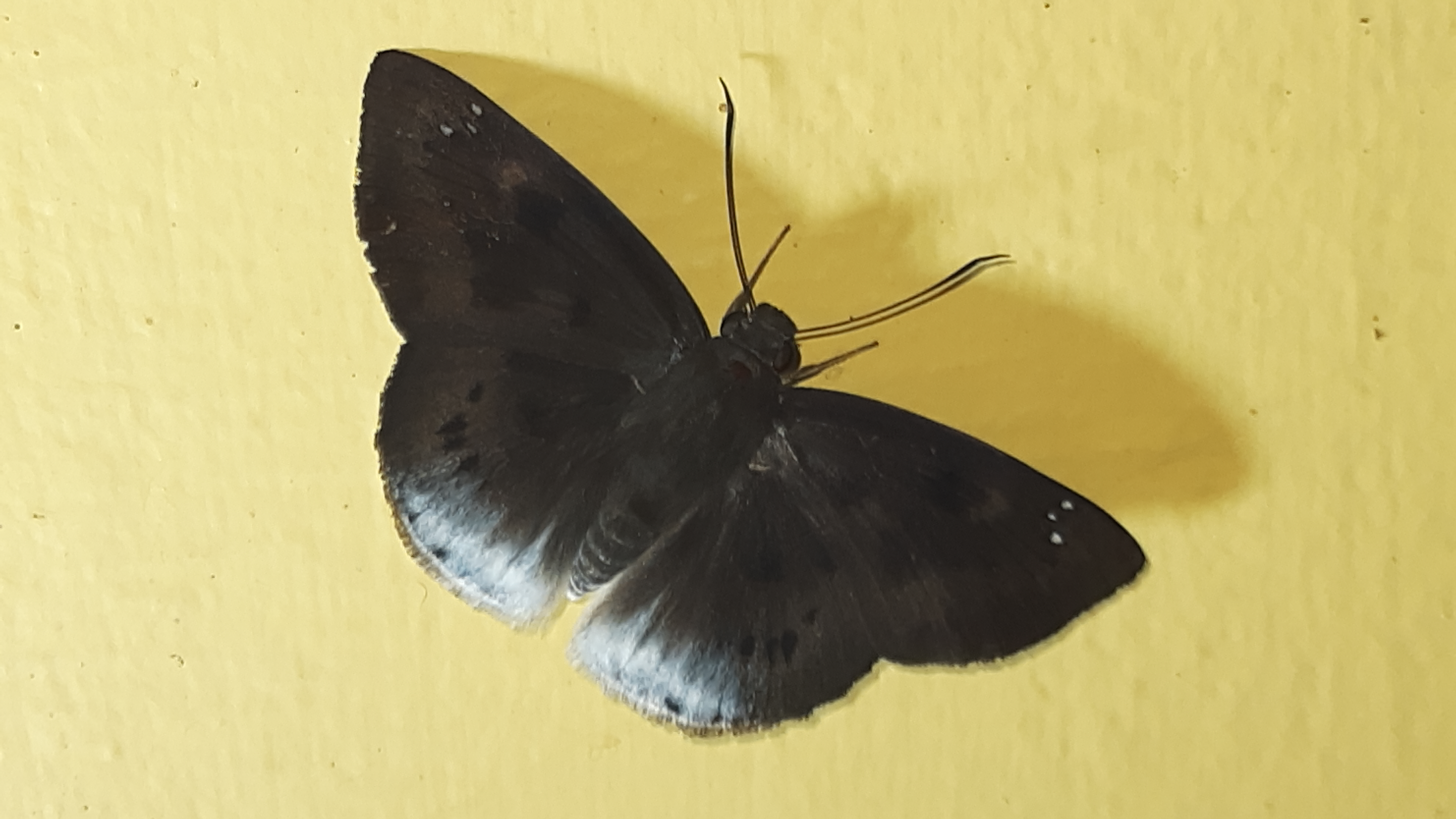
Large snow flat, Tagiades gana

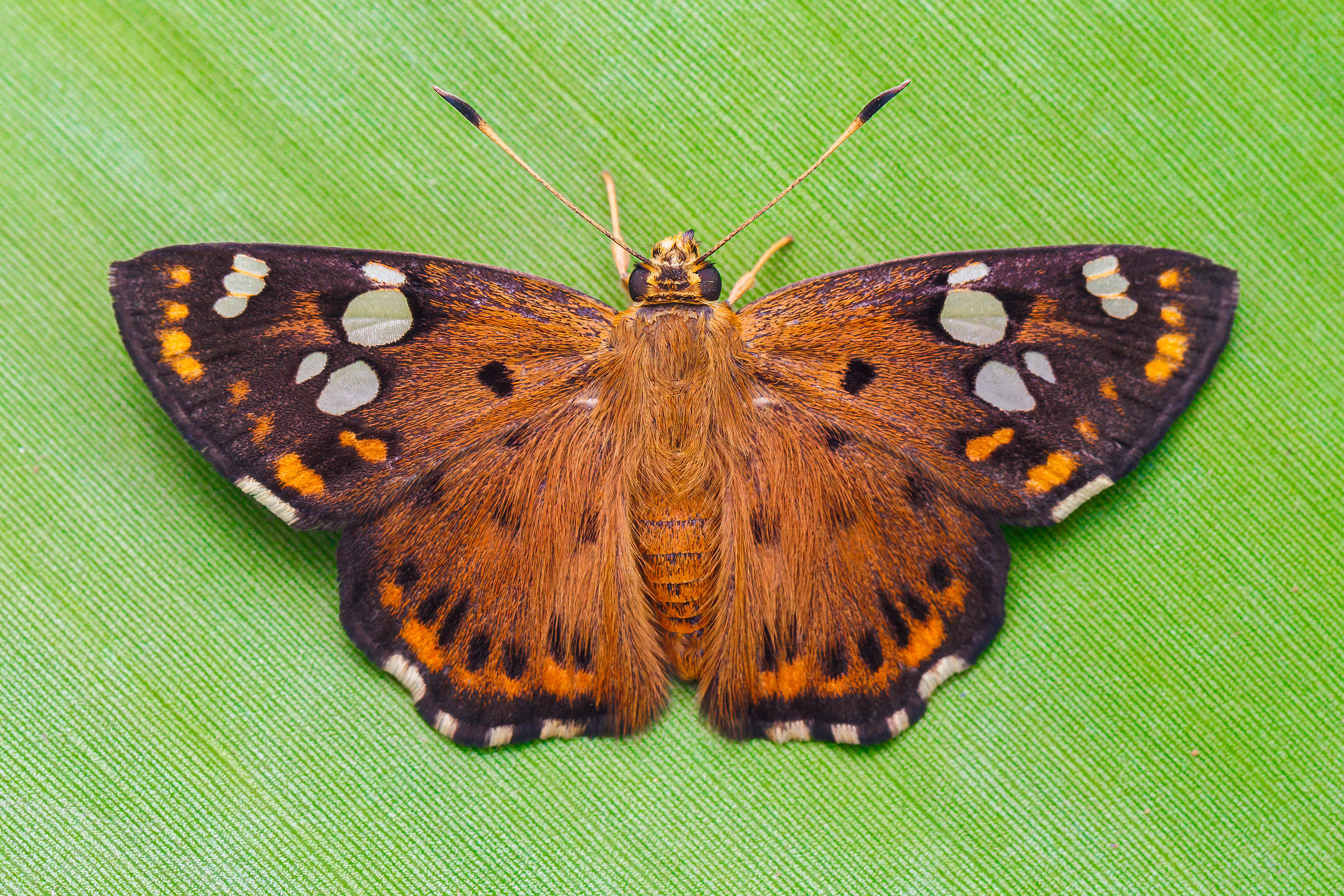
Tricolor pied flat, Coladenia indrani

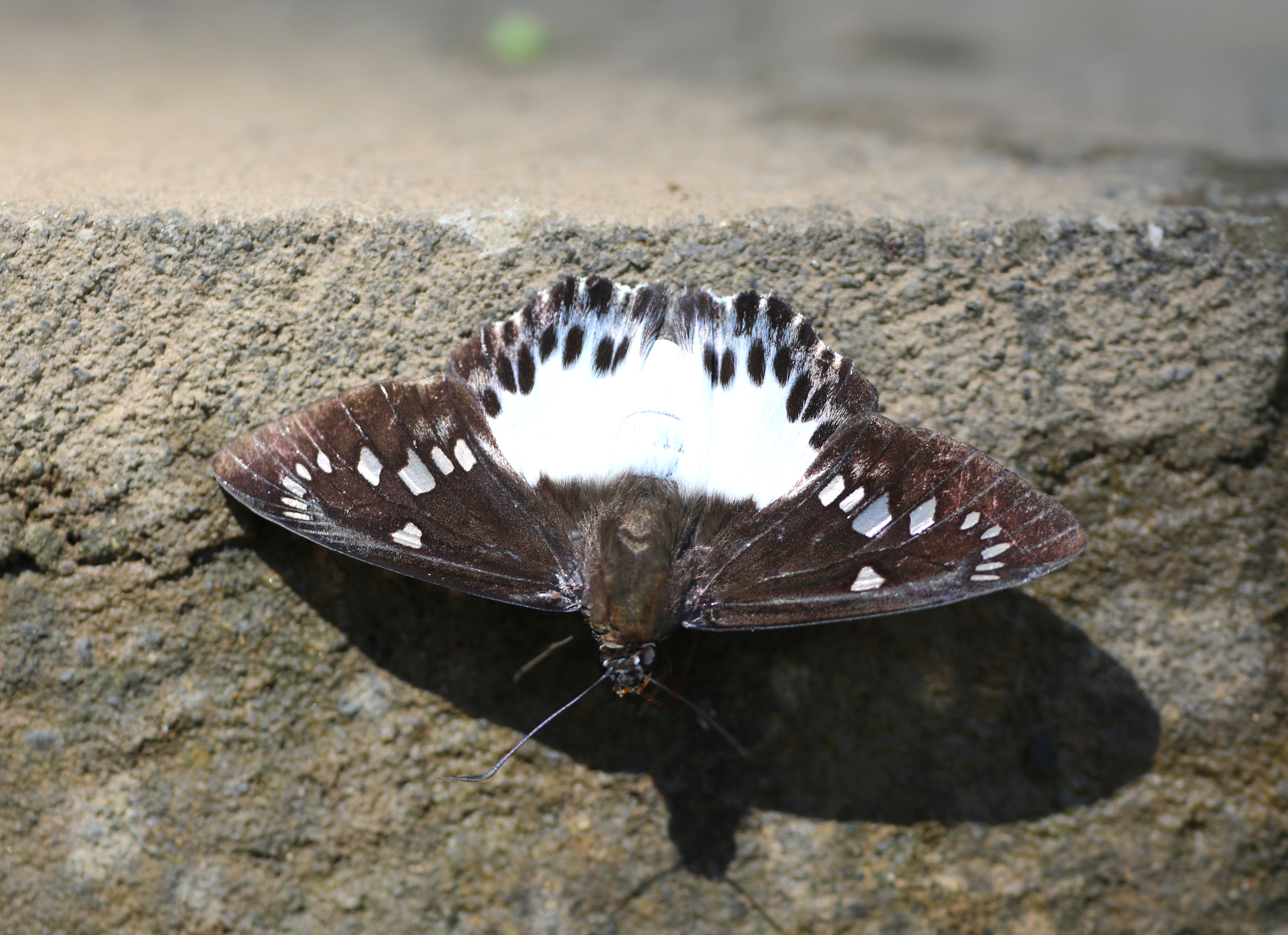
Large white flat, Satarupa gopala

==== Tagiadini ====
| Common name | Binomial name | Subspecies (in India) | Comments |
|---|---|---|---|
| Spotted angle | Abaratha agama | 1 | |
| Alida angle | Abaratha alida | 3 | |
| Chestnut angle | Abaratha angulata | 1 | |
| Kumaon angle | Abaratha saraya | | |
| Golden angle | Abaratha ransonnetii | 1 | |
| Snowy angle | Darpa dealbata | | |
| Hairy angle | Darpa hanria | | |
| Striated angle | Darpa striata | 1 | |
| Zigzag flat | Odina decoratus | | |
| Tiny angle | Tapena miniscula | | |
| Multispot angle | Tapena multiguttata | | |
| Black angle | Tapena thwaitesi | 1 | |
| Tawny angle | Tapena vasava | 1 | |
| Common yellow-breast flat | Gerosis bhagava | 2 | |
| Dusky yellow-breast flat | Gerosis phisara | 1 | |
| White yellow-breast flat | Gerosis sinica | 1 | |
| Striped snow flat | Tagiades cohaerens | 1 | |
| Large snow flat | Tagiades gana | 3 | |
| Common snow flat | Tagiades japetus | 6 | |
| Water snow flat | Tagiades litigiosa | 2 | |
| Spotted snow flat | Tagiades menaka | 1 | |
| Straight snow flat | Tagiades parra | 1 | |
| Striped dawnfly | Capila jayadeva | | |
| Lidderdale's dawnfly | Capila lidderdali | | |
| Fringed dawnfly | Capila penicillatum | 1 | |
| Fulvous dawnfly | Capila phanaeus | 2 | |
| White dawnfly | Capila pieridoides | 1 | |
| Pale striped dawnfly | Capila zennara | | |
| Brown pied flat | Coladenia agni | 1 | |
| Elwes' pied flat | Coladenia agnioides | | |
| Tricolor pied flat | Coladenia indrani | 3 | |
| Grey pied flat | Coladenia laxmi | 1 | |
| Large-spot pied flat | Coladenia pinsbukana | 1 | |
| Large white flat | Satarupa gopala | 1 | |
| Splendid white flat | Satarupa splendens | | |
| Tytler's white flat | Satarupa zulla | 1 | |
| Himalayan white flat | Seseria dohertyi | 1 | |
| Sikkim white flat | Seseria sambara | 1 | |
| Crenulate orange flat | Pintara tabrica | | |
| Yellow flat | Mooreana trichoneura | 1 | |
| Velvet flat | Charmion ficulnea | 1 | |

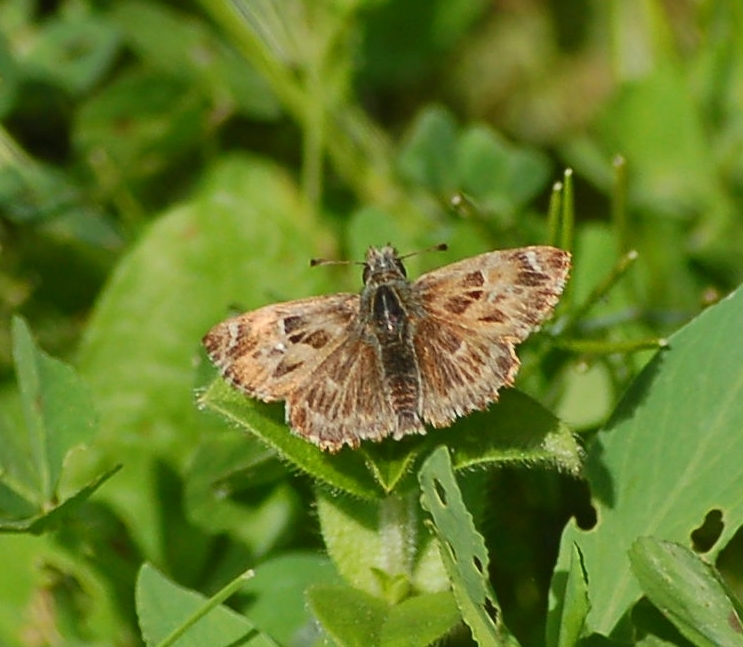
Plain marbled skipper, Carcharodus alceae

=== Pyrginae ===
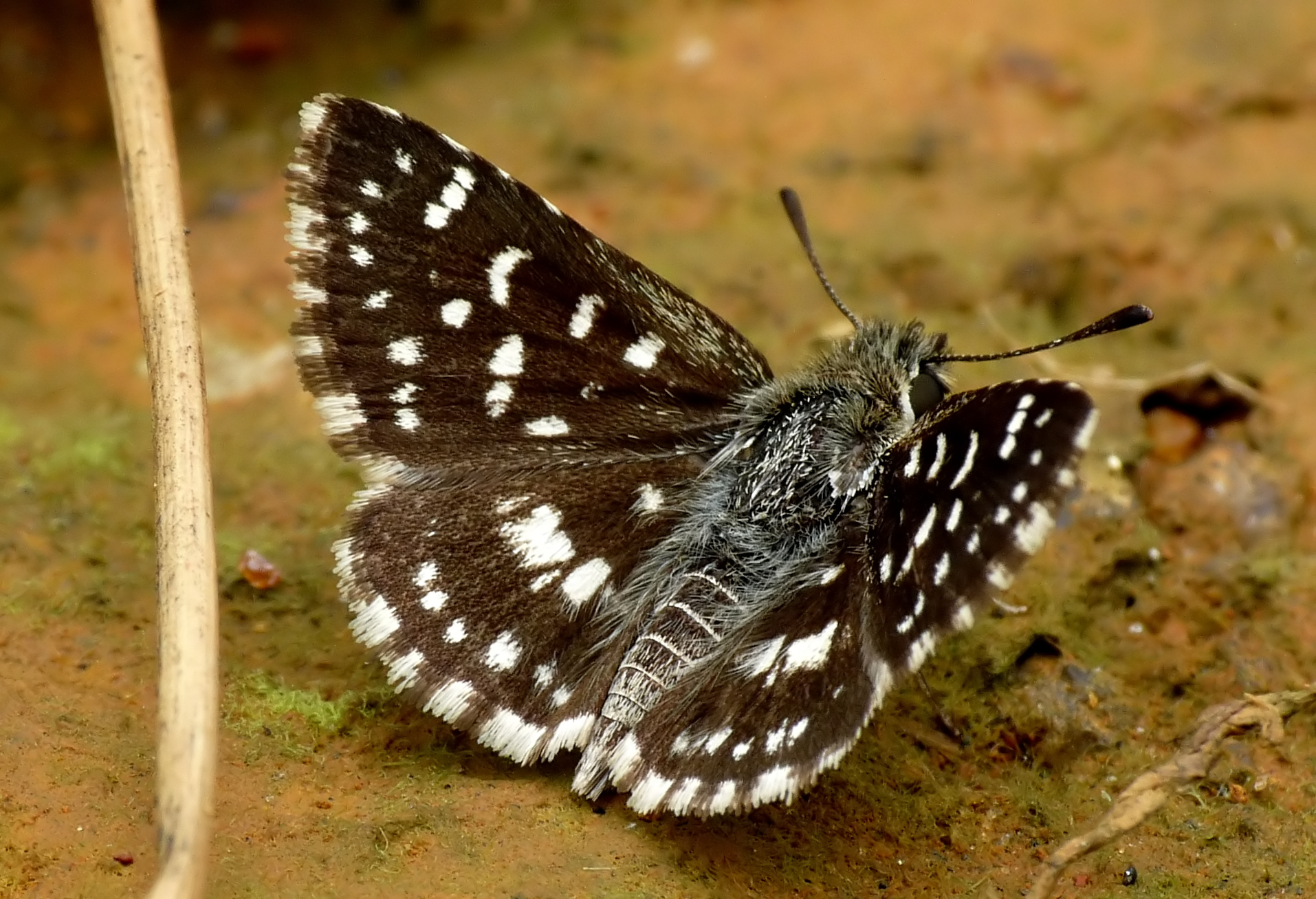
Indian skipper, Spialia galba

==== Carcharodini ====
| Common name | Binomial name | Subspecies (in India) | Comments |
|---|---|---|---|
| Desert skipper | Spialia doris | 1 | |
| Indian skipper | Spialia galba | 1 | |
| Greenish skipper | Spialia orbifer | 1 | |
| Brick-red skipper | Spialia rubicunda | | |
| Zebra skipper | Spialia zebra | 1 | |
| African grizzled skipper | Gomalia elma | 1 | |
| Plain marbled skipper | Carcharodus alceae | 1 | |
| Tufted marbled skipper | Carcharodus dravira | | |

==== Pyrgini ====
| Common name | Binomial name | Subspecies (in India) | Comments |
|---|---|---|---|
| Mountain skipper | Pyrgus alpinus | 1 | |
| Kashmir skipper | Pyrgus cashmirensis | 2 | |
| Darwaz skipper | Pyrgus darwazicus | 1 | |

==== Erynnini ====
| Common name | Binomial name | Subspecies (in India) | Comments |
|---|---|---|---|
| Inky duskywing | Erynnis pathan | | |
| Frosted duskywing | Erynnis pelias | 1 | |

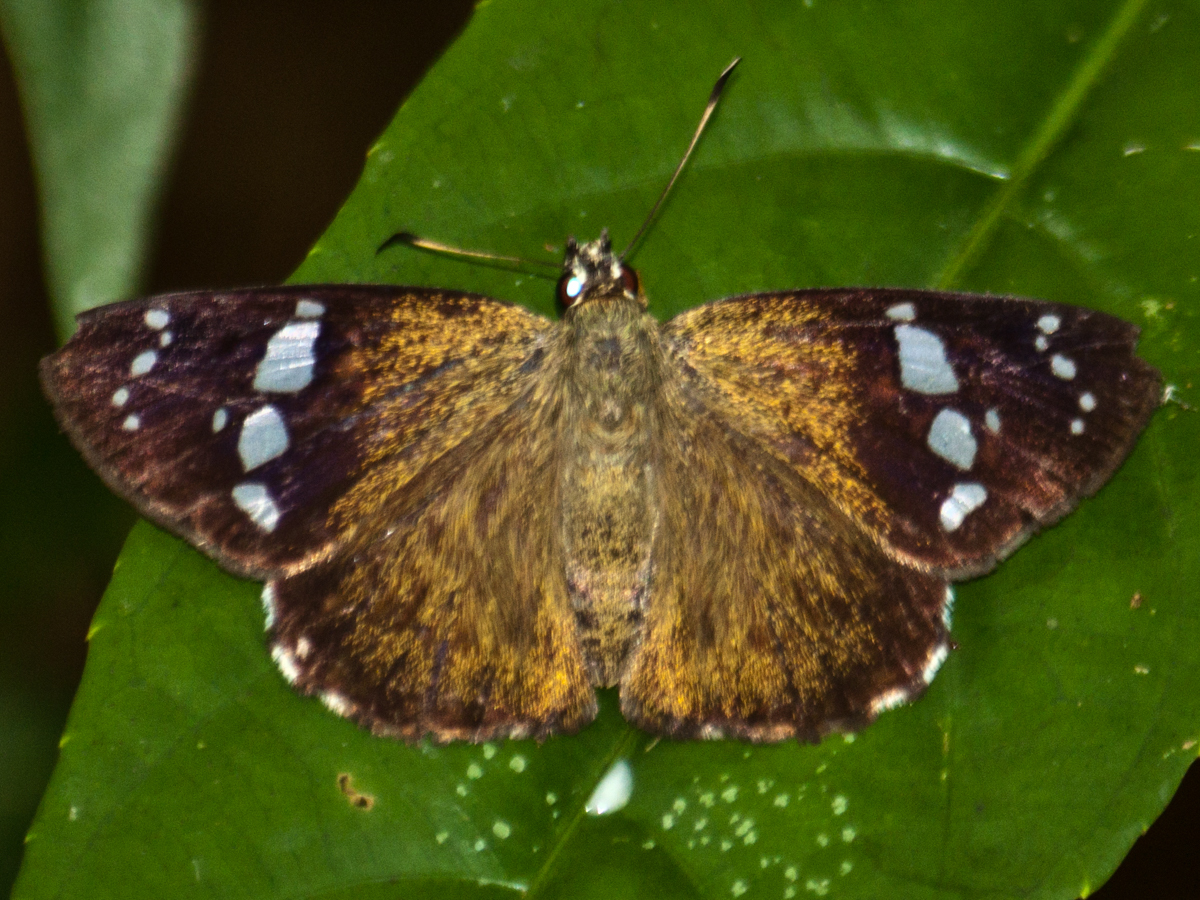
Olive flat, Chamunda chamunda

=== Chamundinae ===
| Common name | Binomial name | Subspecies (in India) | Comments |
|---|---|---|---|
| Olive flat | Chamunda chamunda | | |

=== Heteropterinae ===
| Common name | Binomial name | Subspecies (in India) | Comments |
|---|---|---|---|
| Orange-and-silver hopper | Carterocephalus avanti | 1 | |

=== Barcinae ===
| Common name | Binomial name | Subspecies (in India) | Comments |
|---|---|---|---|
| Giant hopper | Apostictopterus fuliginosus | 1 | |

=== Hesperiinae ===
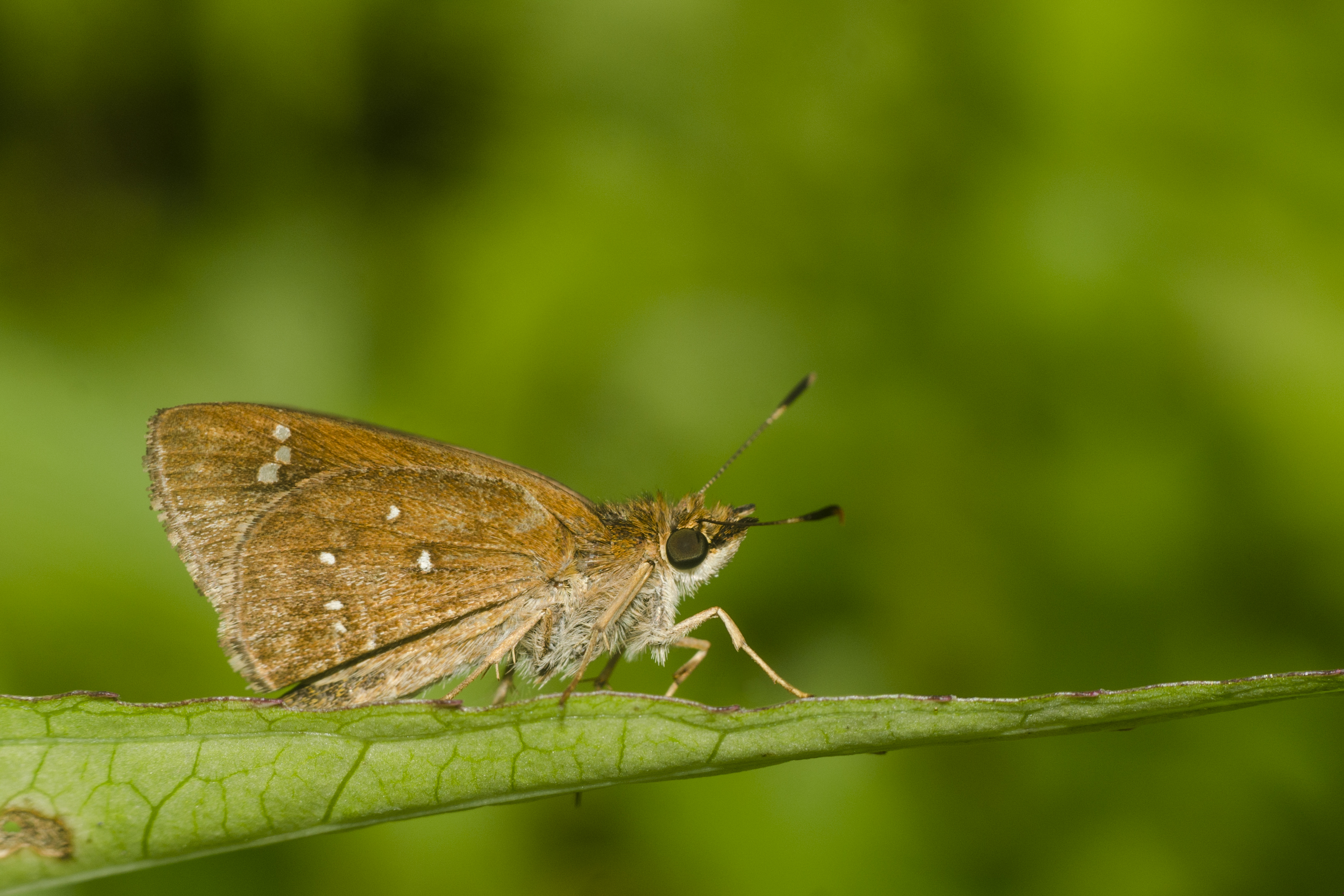
Atkinson's bob, Arnetta atkinsoni

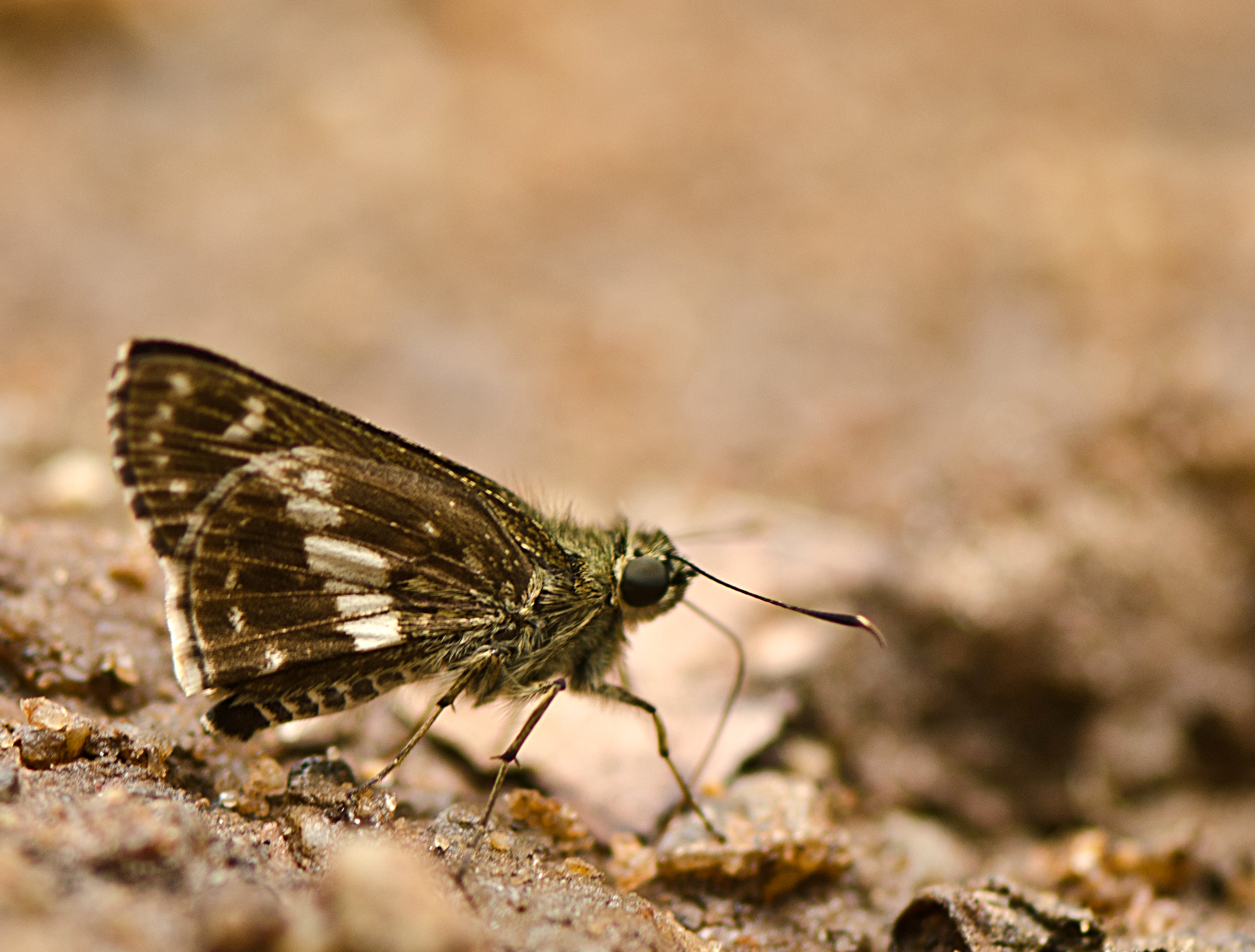
Moore's ace, Halpe porus

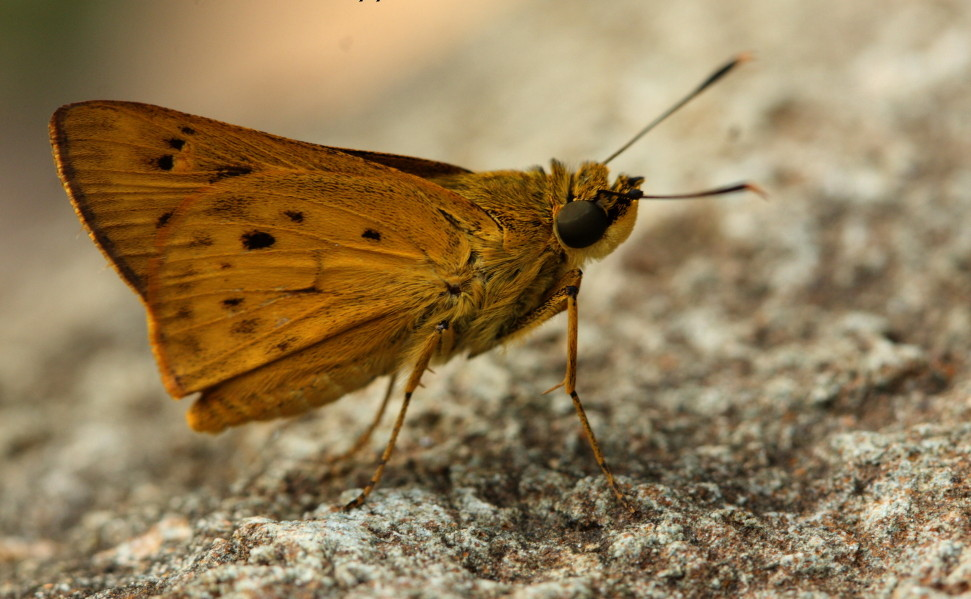
Madras ace, Thoressa honorei

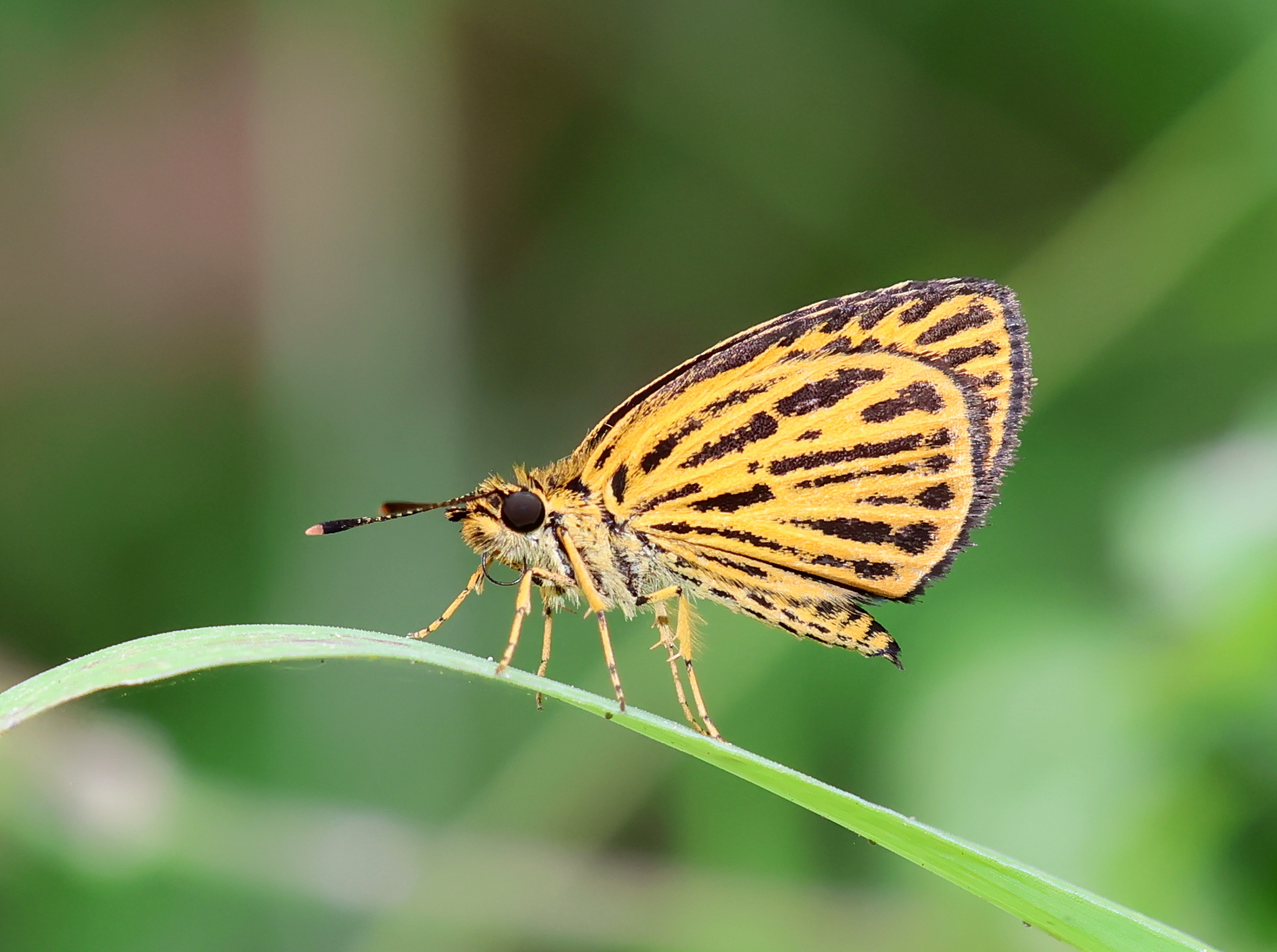
Tiger hopper, Ampittia subvittatus

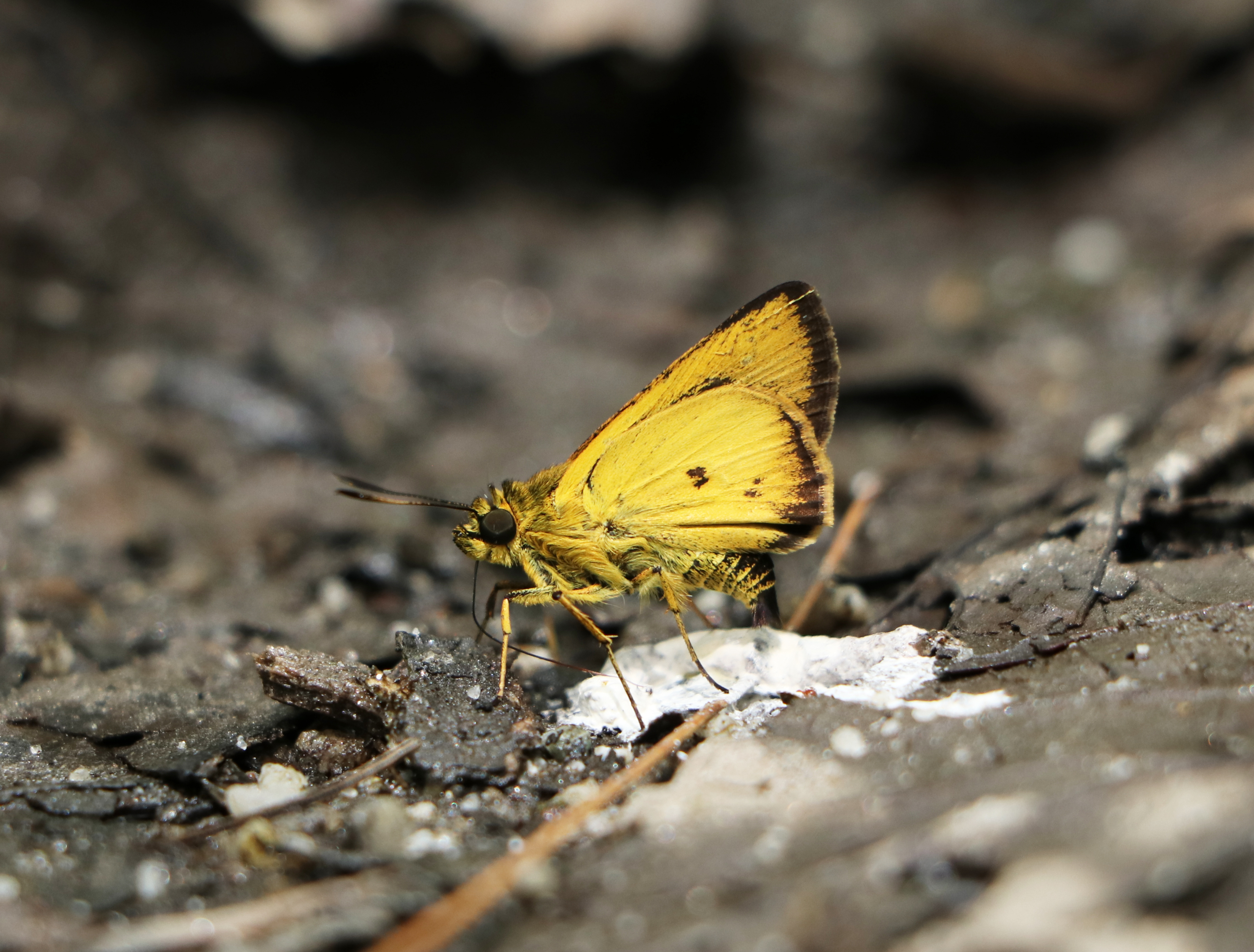
Chocolate-bordered flitter, Zographetus dzonguensis

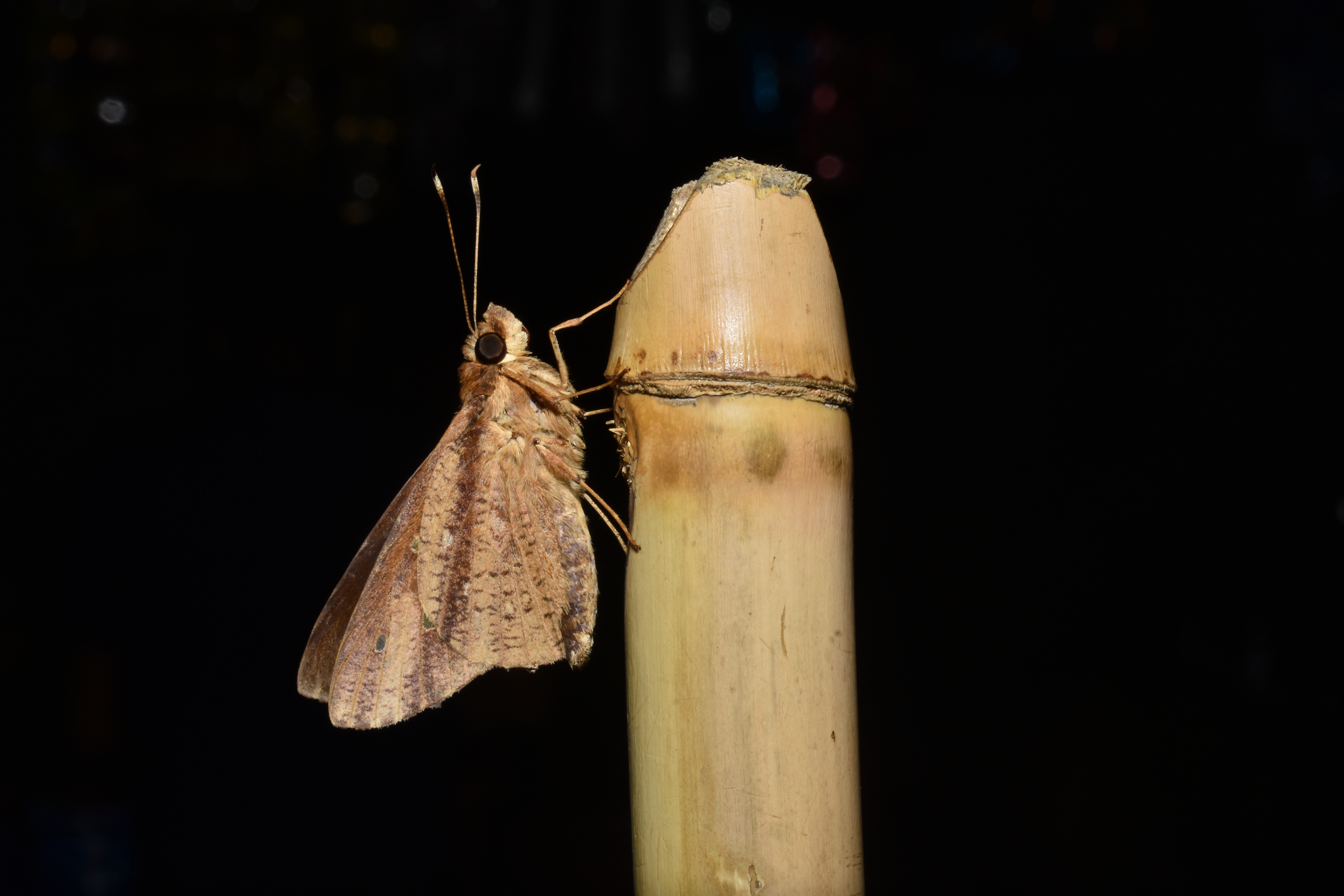
Veined palmer, Hidari bhawani

==== Aeromachini ====
| Common name | Binomial name | Subspecies (in India) | Comments |
|---|---|---|---|
| Nonsuch palmer | Creteus cyrina | 1 | |
| Atkinson's bob | Arnetta atkinsoni | | |
| Coorg forest bob | Arnetta mercara | | |
| Vindhyan bob | Arnetta vindhiana | 2 | |
| Graham's ace | Sovia grahami | 1 | |
| Lucas' ace | Sovia lucasii | 1 | |
| Manipur ace | Sovia malta | | Endemic (only known from Manipur) |
| Chequered ace | Sovia separata | 1 | |
| Dingy scrub hopper | Aeromachus dubius | 2 | |
| Grey scrub hopper | Aeromachus jhora | 2 | |
| Blue-spotted scrub hopper | Aeromachus kali | | |
| Pygmy scrub hopper | Aeromachus pygmaeus | | |
| Veined scrub hopper | Aeromachus stigmata | 2 | |
| Hedge hopper | Baracus vittatus | 4 | |
| Overlapped ace | Halpe arcuata | | |
| Gold-spotted ace | Halpe aucma | 1 | |
| Elwes' ace | Halpe filda | | |
| Tavoy sulphur ace | Halpe flava | | |
| Pale-marked ace | Halpe hauxwelli | | |
| Indian ace | Halpe homolea | 1 | Schedule 2 |
| Knyvett's ace | Halpe knyvetti | | |
| Plain ace | Halpe kumara | 1 | |
| Tenasserim ace | Halpe kusala | | |
| Molta ace | Halpe molta | | |
| Moore's ace | Halpe porus | | |
| Sikkim ace | Halpe sikkima | | |
| Confusing ace | Halpe wantona | | |
| Banded ace | Halpe zema | 1 | |
| Long-banded ace | Halpe zola | | |
| Banded straw ace | Pithauria marsena | | |
| Dark straw ace | Pithauria murdava | | |
| Light straw ace | Pithauria stramineipennis | 1 | |
| Fuscous ace | Pedesta fusca | 1 | |
| Olive ace | Pedesta gupta | 1 | |
| Largespot plain ace | Pedesta hyrie | | |
| Mussoorie bush bob | Pedesta masuriensis | 1 | |
| Naga bush bob | Pedesta panda | | |
| Brown bush bob | Pedesta pandita | | |
| Garwhal ace | Thoressa aina | | |
| Southern spotted ace | Thoressa astigmata | | |
| Northern spotted ace | Thoressa cerata | | |
| Evershed's ace | Thoressa evershedi | | |
| Madras ace | Thoressa honorei | | |
| Mason's ace | Thoressa masoni | | |
| Tamil ace | Thoressa sitala | | Endemic |
| Tufted ace | Sebastonyma dolopia | | |
| Bush hopper | Ampittia dioscorides | 1 | |
| Scarce bush hopper | Ampittia maroides | | |
| Tiger hopper | Ampittia subvittatus | 1 | |
| White-branded ace | Halpemorpha hyrtacus | | Endemic |
| Veined dart | Actinor radians | | |
| Wax dart | Cupitha purreea | | |
| Chocolate-bordered flitter | Zographetus dzonguensis | | |
| Sikkim flitter | Zographetus flavalum | | |
| Sahyadri spotted flitter | Zographetus mathewi | | Endemic |
| Purple-spotted flitter | Zographetus ogygia | | |
| Small flitter | Zographetus rama | | |
| Purple-and-gold flitter | Zographetus satwa | | |
| Desert torpedo | Eogenes alcides | 1 | |
| Leslie's torpedo | Eogenes lesliei | | |
| Forest hopper | Astictopterus jama | 1 | |
| Veined palmer | Hidari bhawani | | |

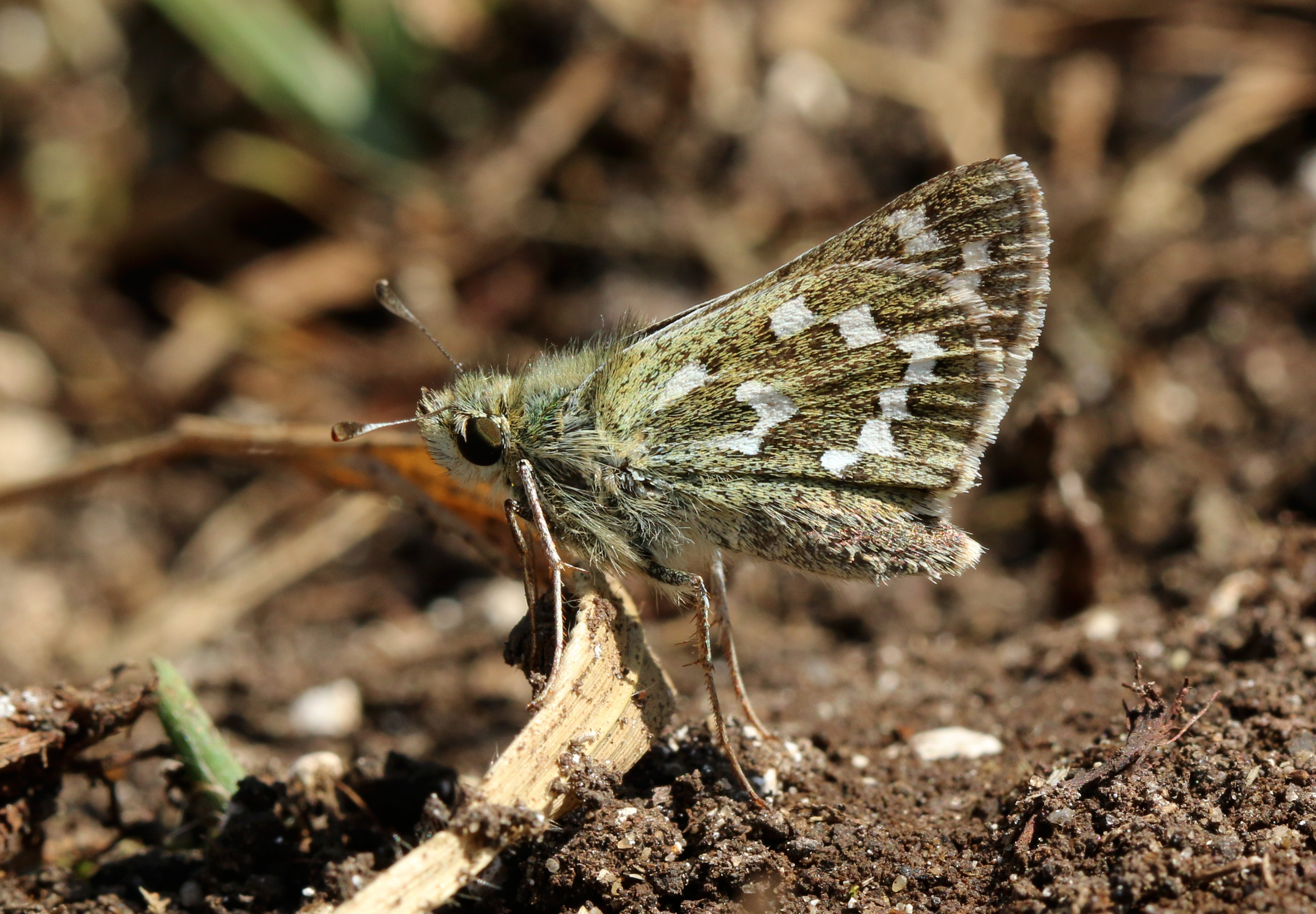
Chequered darter, Hesperia comma

==== Hesperiini ====
| Common name | Binomial name | Subspecies (in India) | Comments |
|---|---|---|---|
| Chequered darter | Hesperia comma | 1 | |
| Himalayan darter | Ochlodes brahma | | |
| Assam darter | Ochlodes siva | 1 | |
| Sub-hyaline darter | Ochlodes subhyalina | 1 | |

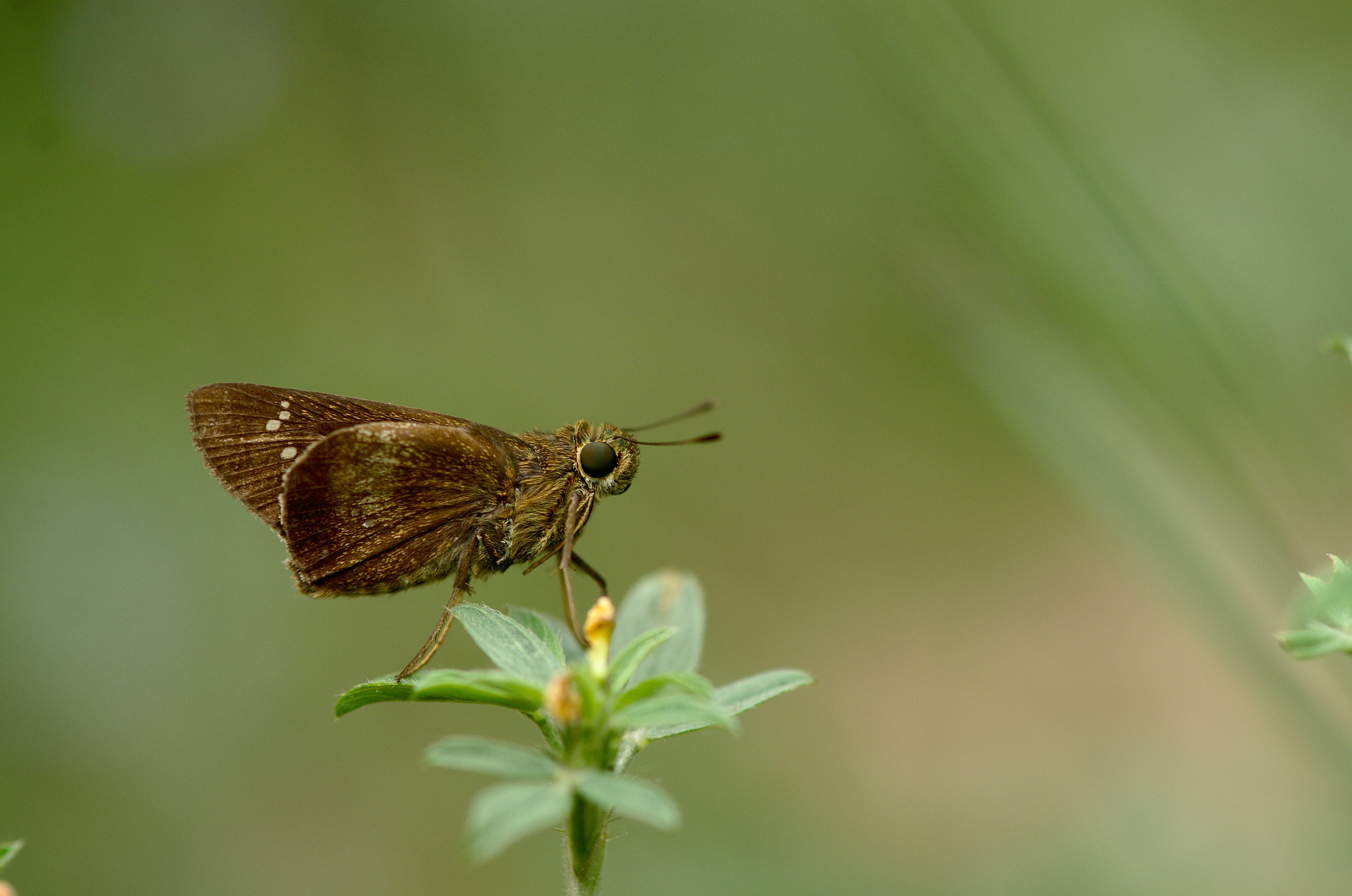
Kanara swift, Caltoris canaraica

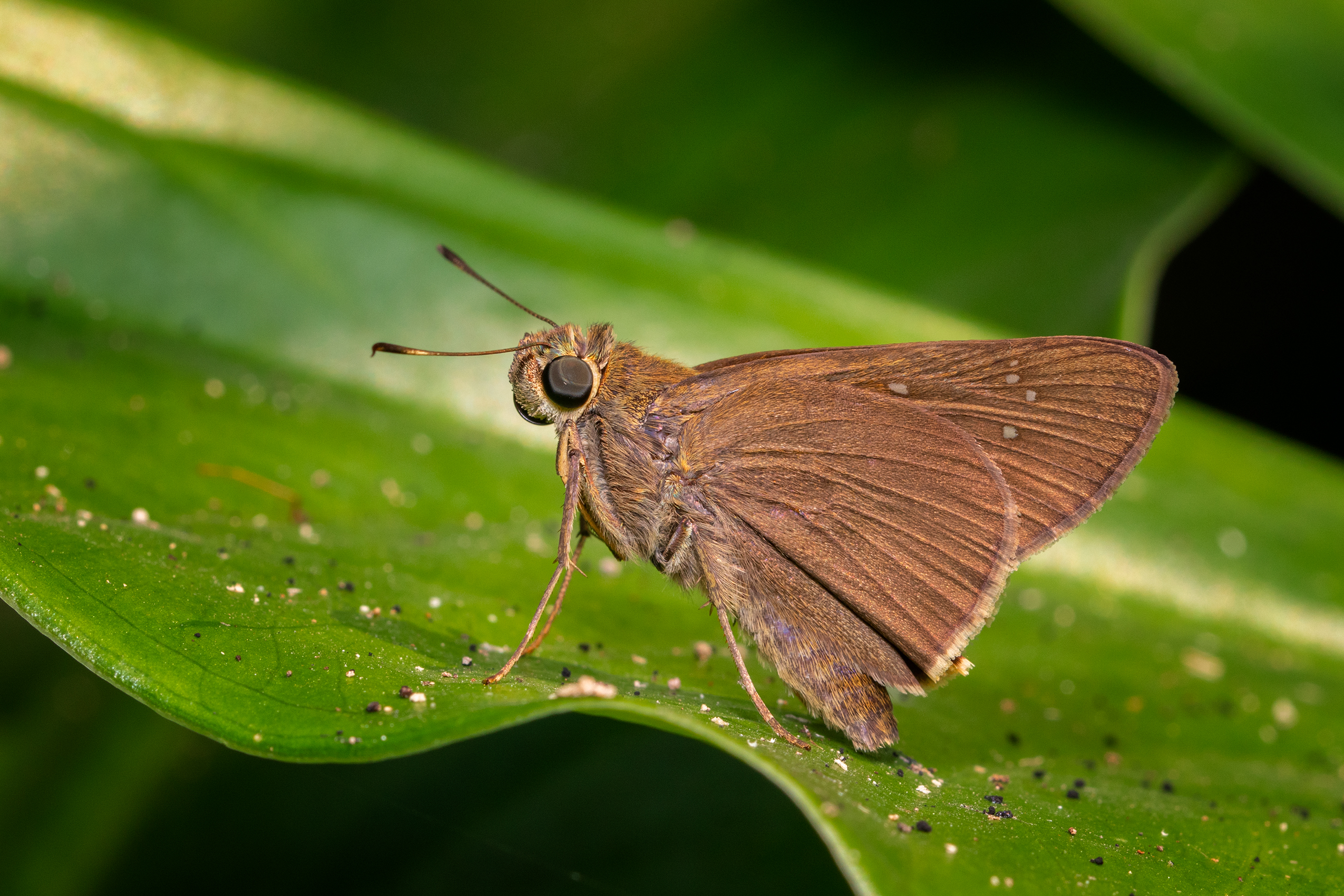
Paintbrush swift, Baoris farri

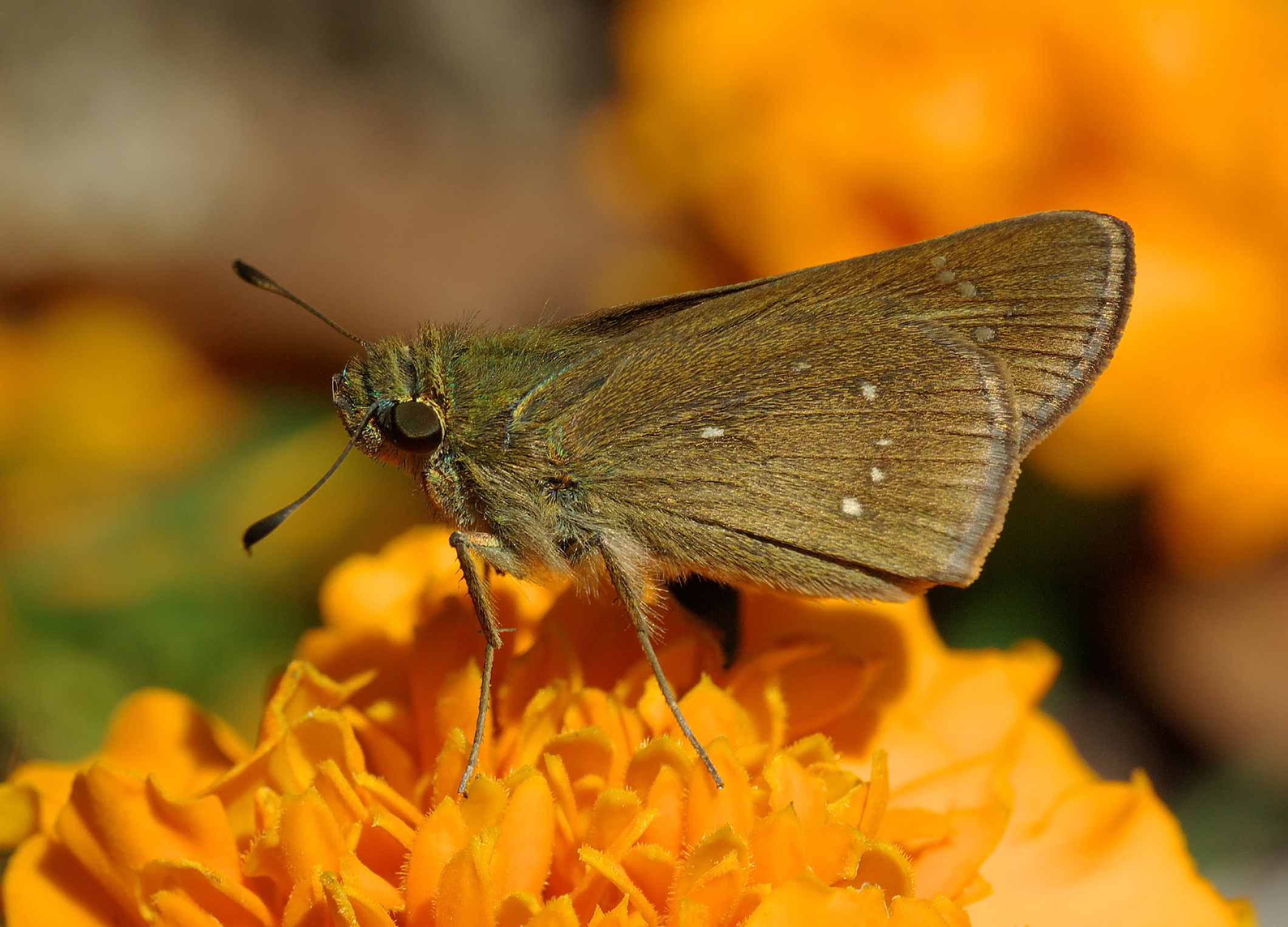
Small-branded swift, Pelopidas mathias

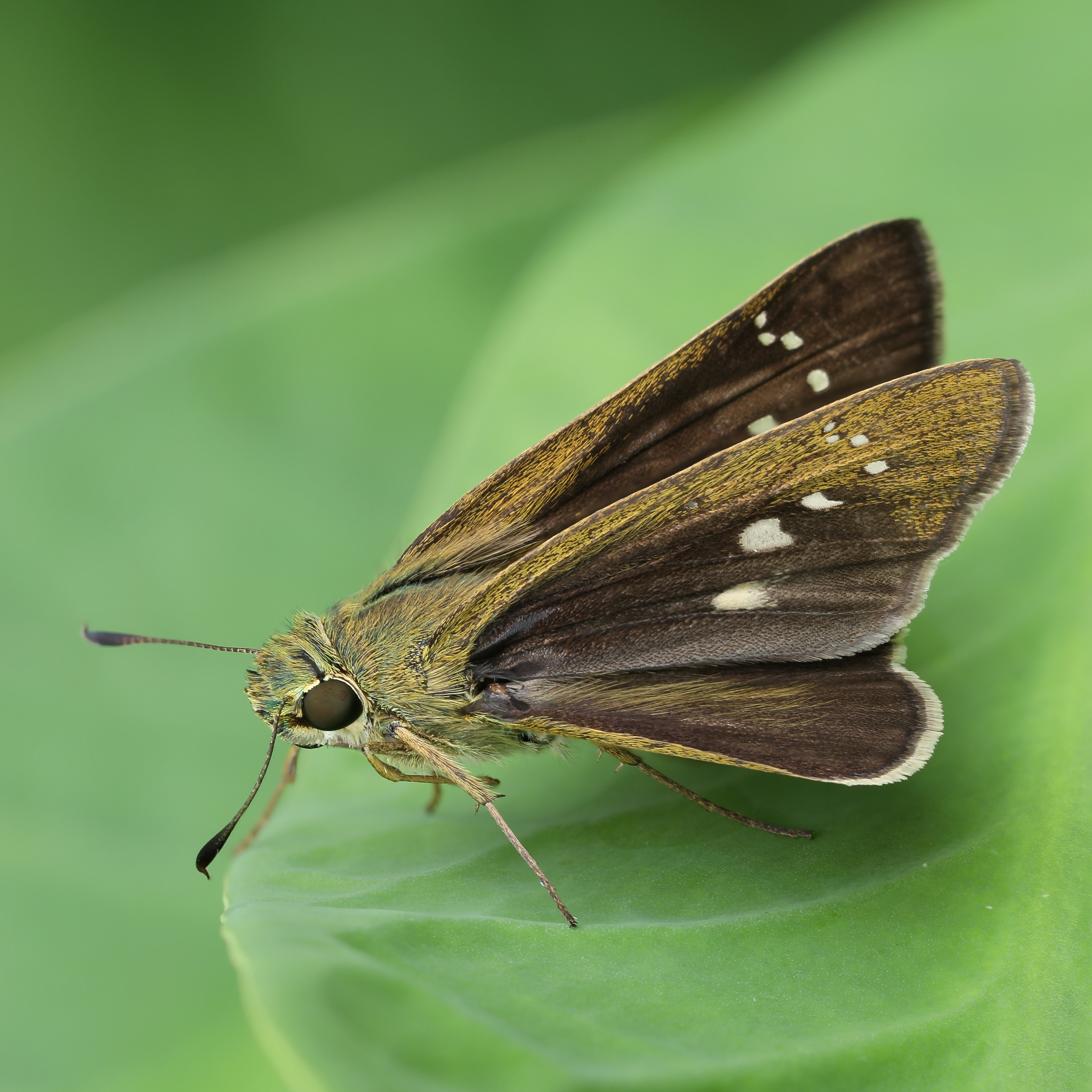
Rice swift, Borbo cinnara

==== Baorini ====
| Common name | Binomial name | Subspecies (in India) | Comments |
|---|---|---|---|
| Himalayan swift | Zenonoida discreta | 1 | |
| Yellow-spot swift | Zenonoida eltola | 1 | |
| Yellow-fringed swift | Caltoris aurociliata | | |
| Extra-spot swift | Caltoris bromus | 1 | |
| Dark-branded swift | Caltoris brunnea | 1 | |
| Colon swift | Caltoris cahira | 2 | |
| Kanara swift | Caltoris canaraica | | |
| Arunachal swift | Caltoris chimdroa | | |
| Confusing swift | Caltoris confusa | | |
| Full-stop swift | Caltoris cormasa | | |
| Blank swift | Caltoris kumara | 2 | |
| Philippine swift | Caltoris philippina | 1 | |
| Tufted swift | Caltoris plebeia | | |
| Sirius swift | Caltoris sirius | 1 | |
| Purple swift | Tulsia tulsi | 1 | |
| Paintbrush swift | Baoris farri | 2 | |
| Figure of eight swift | Baoris pagana | | |
| Black paintbrush swift | Baoris penicillata | 1 | |
| Obscure-branded swift | Pelopidas agna | 1 | |
| Great swift | Pelopidas assamensis | | |
| Conjoined swift | Pelopidas conjuncta | 2 | |
| Small-branded swift | Pelopidas mathias | 1 | |
| Large-branded swift | Pelopidas sinensis | | |
| Moore's swift | Pelopidas subochracea | 1 | |
| Pale small-branded swift | Pelopidas thrax | 2 | |
| Beavan's swift | Pseudoborbo bevani | | |
| Dingy swift | Gegenes nostrodamus | | |
| Pygmy swift | Gegenes pumilio | 1 | |
| Rice swift | Borbo cinnara | | |
| Contiguous swift | Polytremis lubricans | 1 | |
| Baby swift | Polytremis minuta | | |
| Common wight | Iton semamora | 1 | |
| Continental swift | Parnara ganga | | |
| Himalayan straight swift | Parnara mangala | | |
| Kanara straight swift | Parnara philotas | | |
| Straight swift | Parnara guttatus | 1 | |
| Oriental straight swift | Parnara bada | | |
| Good swift | Parnara guda | | |

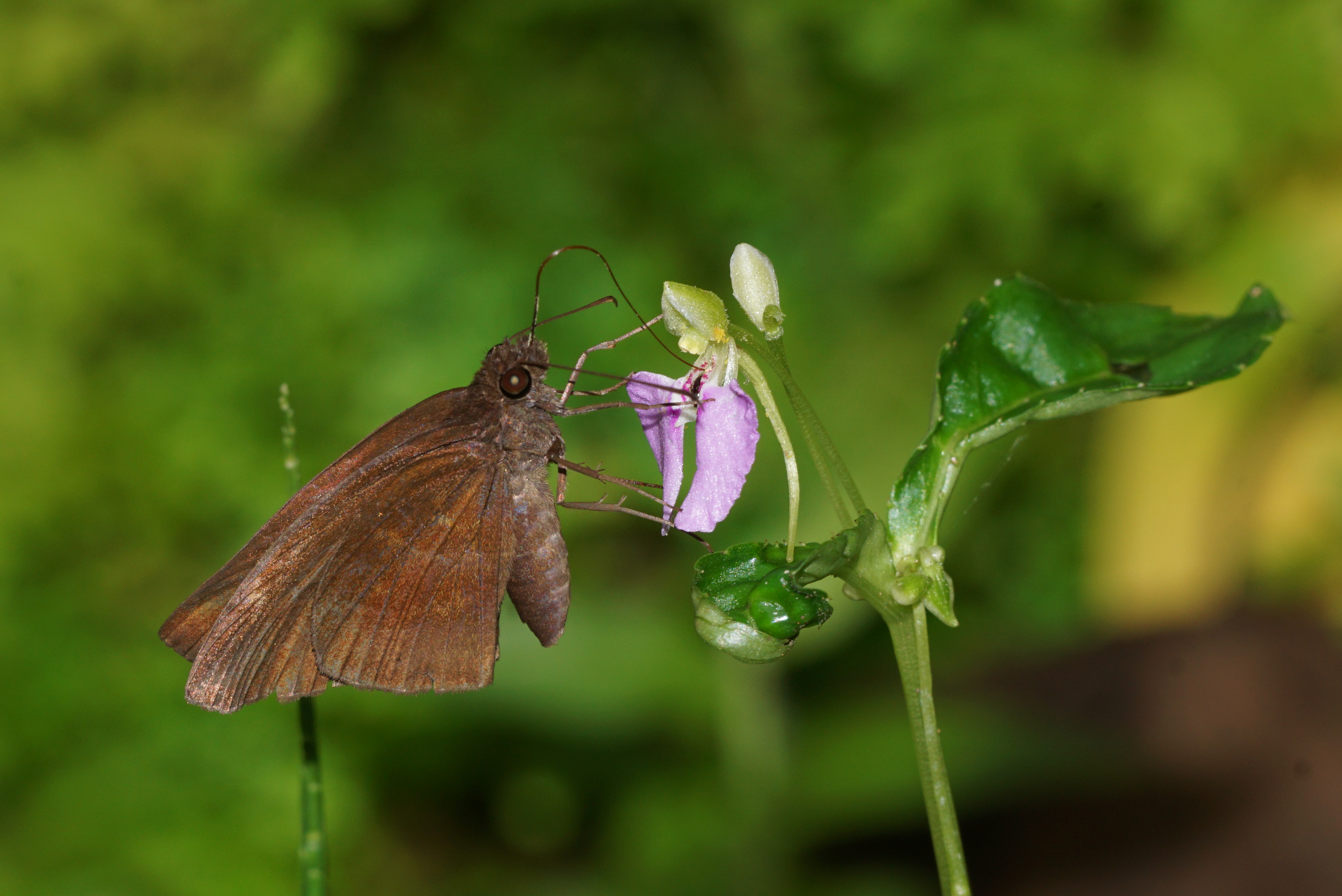
Coon, Psolos fuligo

==== Psolosini ====
| Common name | Binomial name | Subspecies (in India) | Comments |
|---|---|---|---|
| Dark velvet bob | Koruthaialos butleri | | |
| Narrow-banded velvet bob | Koruthaialos rubecula | 1 | |
| Bright red velvet bob | Koruthaialos sindu | 1 | |
| Pale demon | Koruthaialos swinhoei | 1 | |
| Coon | Psolos fuligo | 1 | |

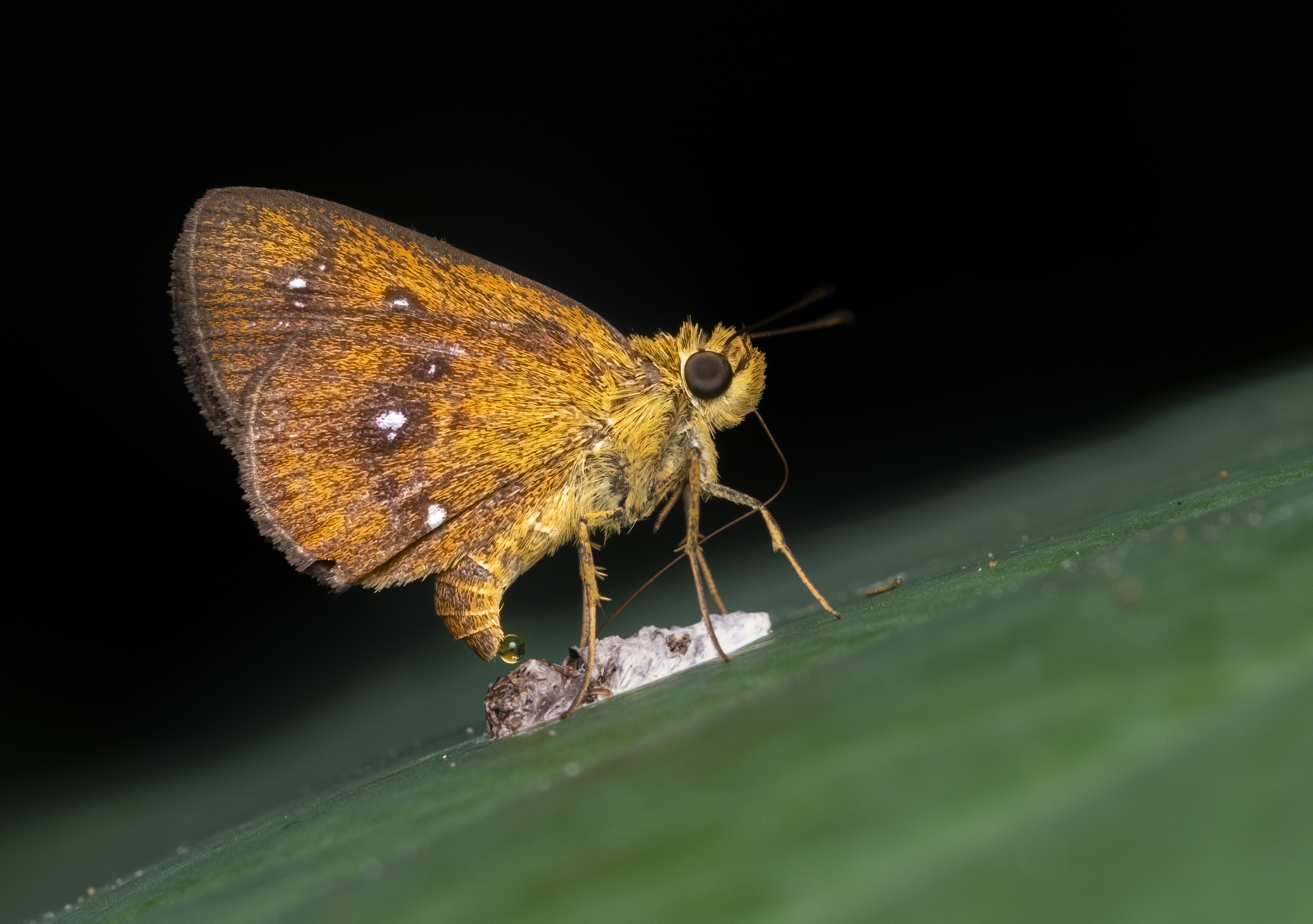
Chestnut bob, Iambrix salsala

==== Ismini ====
| Common name | Binomial name | Subspecies (in India) | Comments |
|---|---|---|---|
| Assam lancer | Isma bonota | | |
| Chestnut bob | Iambrix salsala | 2 | |

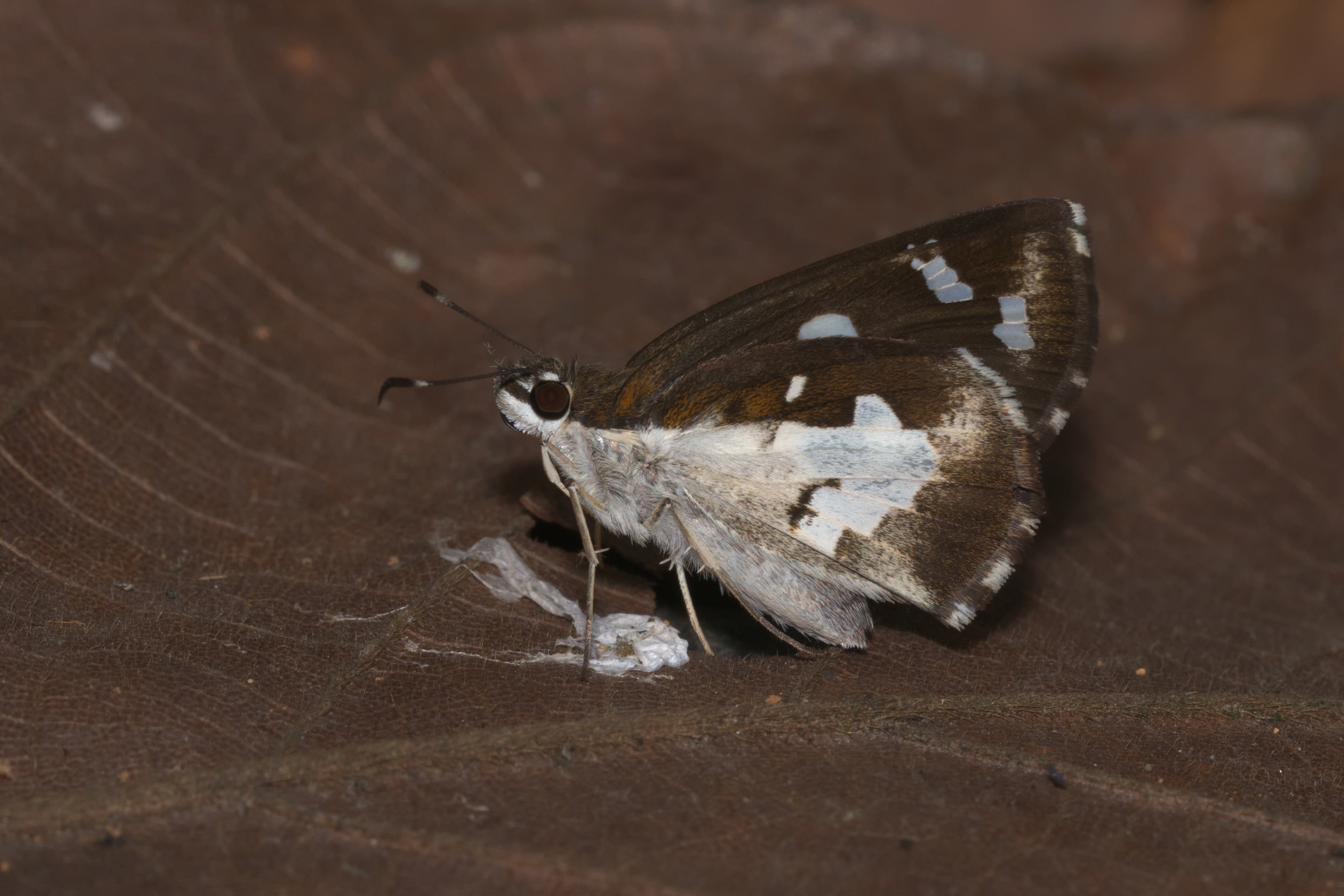
Grass demon, Ancistroides folus

==== Notocryptini ====
| Common name | Binomial name | Subspecies (in India) | Comments |
|---|---|---|---|
| Chocolate demon | Tamela nigrita | 1 | |
| Restricted demon | Ancistroides curvifascia | 1 | |
| Spotted demon | Ancistroides feisthamelii | 1 | |
| Grass demon | Ancistroides folus | | |
| Common banded demon | Ancistroides paralysos | 3 | |

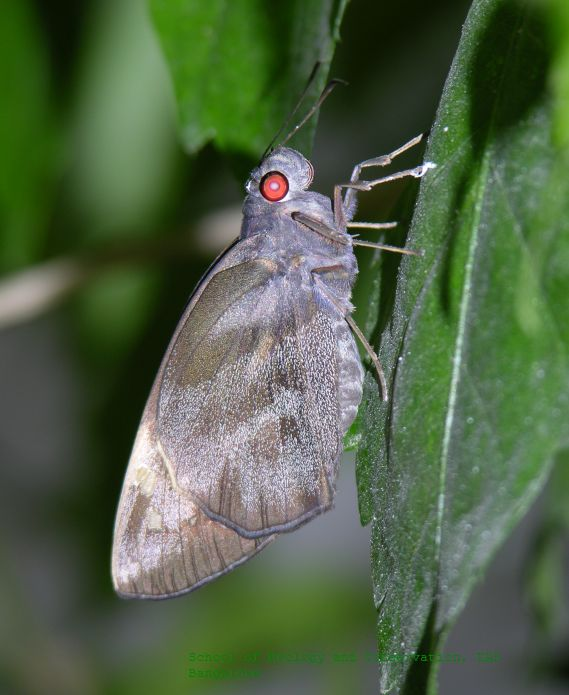
Giant redeye, Gangara thyrsis

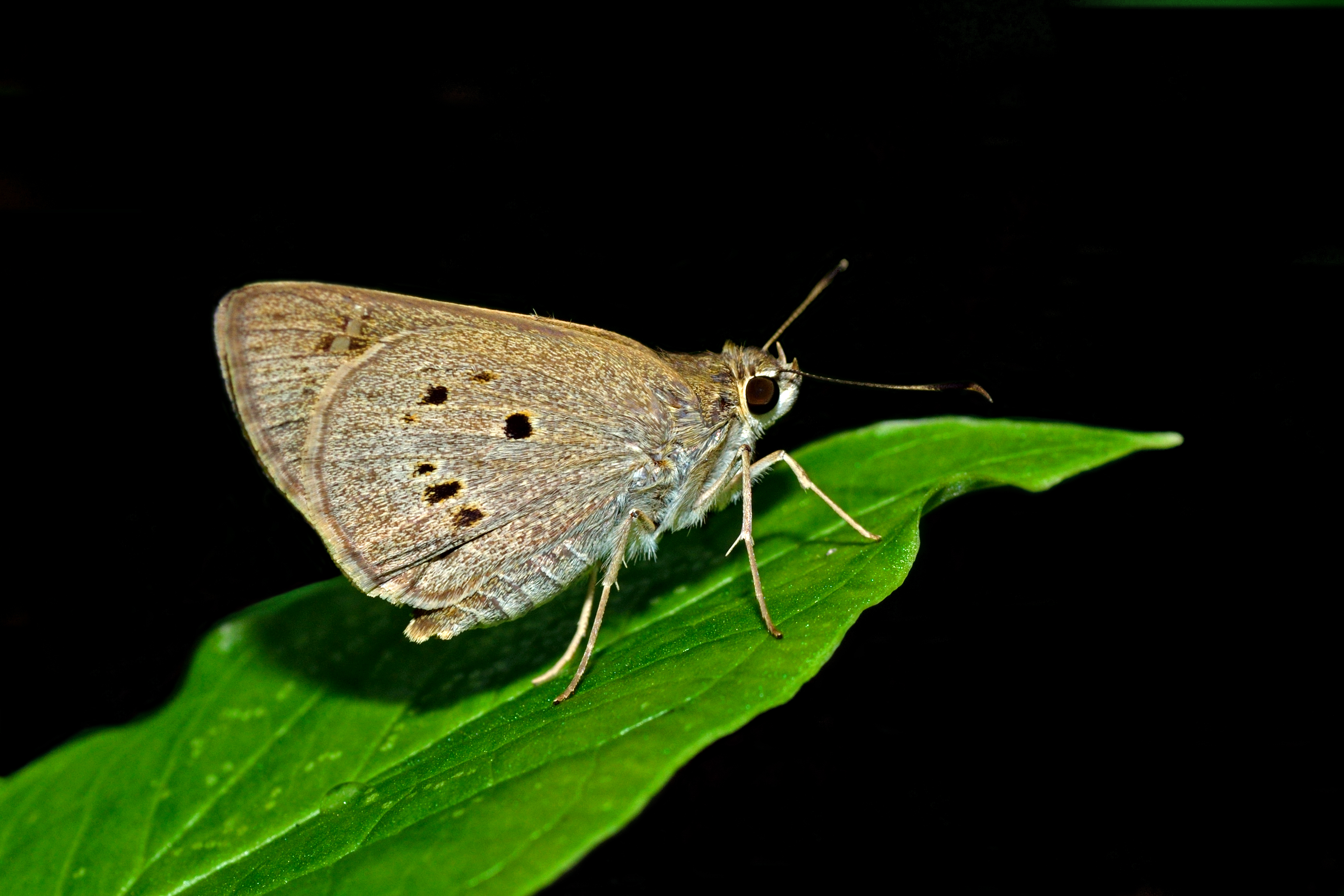
Indian palm bob, Suastus gremius

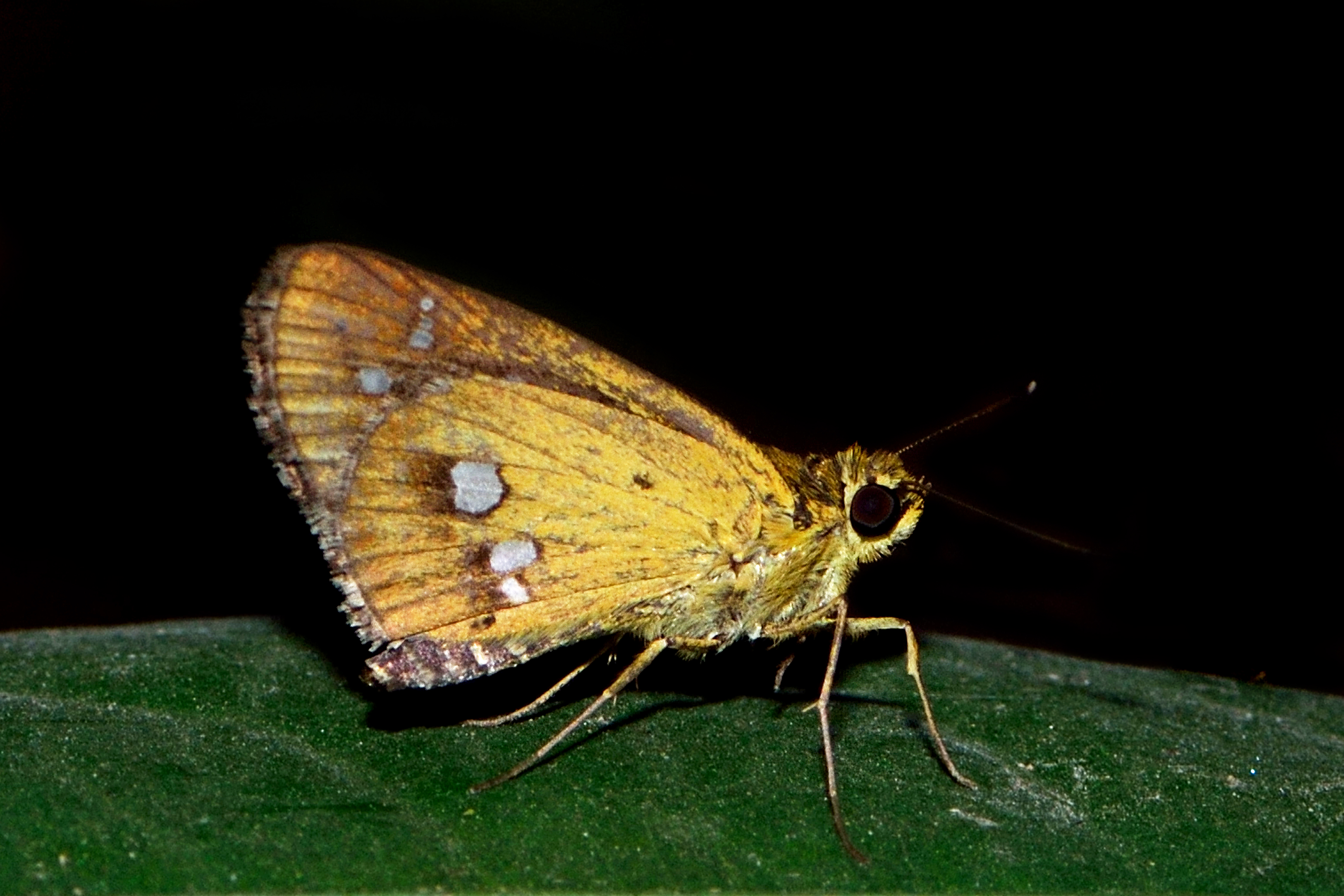
Forest bob, Scobura cephala

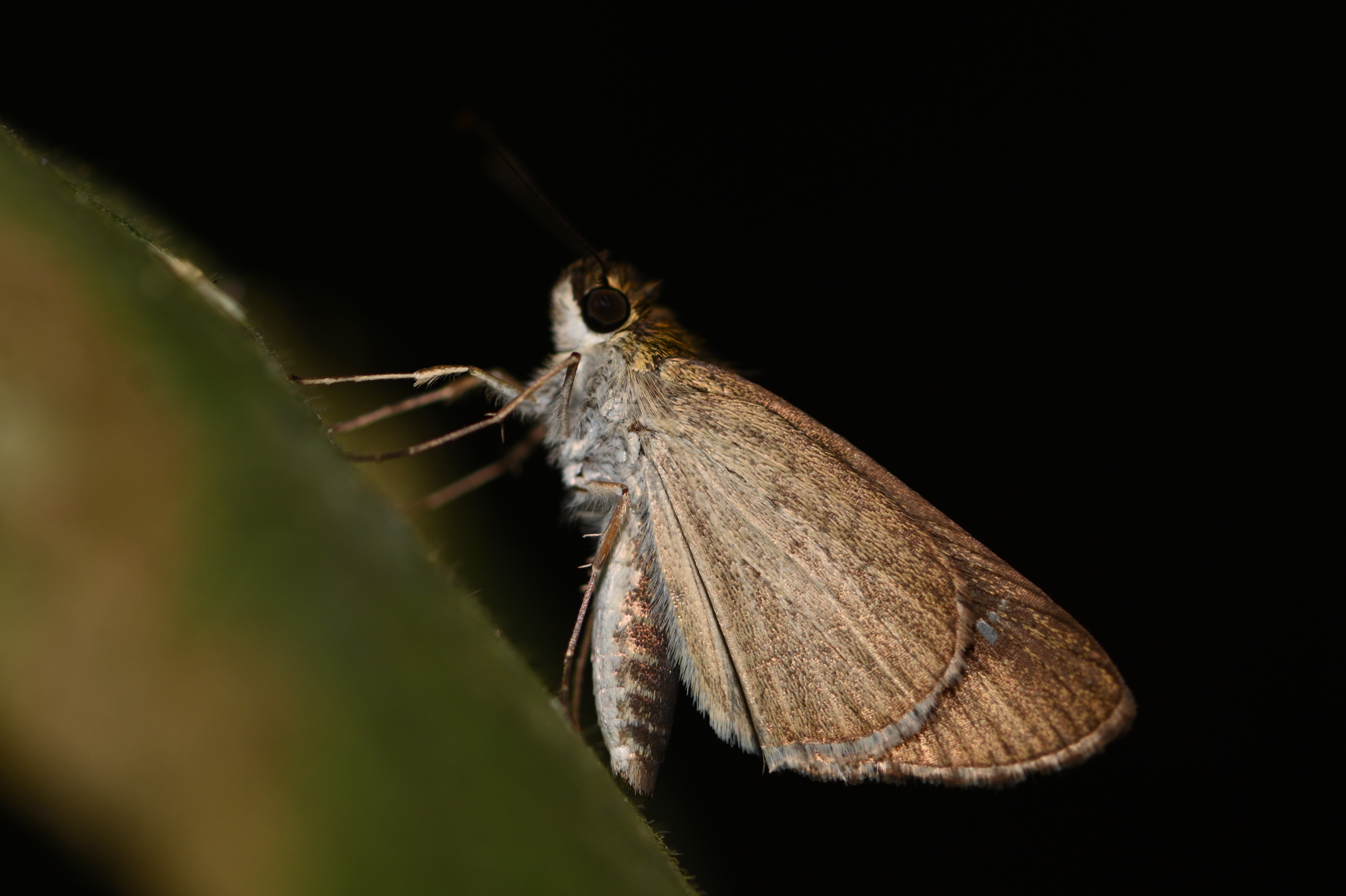
Grass bob, Suada swerga

==== Erionotini ====
| Common name | Binomial name | Subspecies (in India) | Comments |
|---|---|---|---|
| Banded redeye | Gangara lebadea | 2 | |
| Giant redeye | Gangara thyrsis | 1 | |
| Small palm redeye | Erionota acroleuca | 2 | |
| Palm redeye | Erionota thrax | 1 | |
| Banana skipper | Erionota torus | | |
| Redeye palmer | Zela zeus | 1 | |
| Yellowband palmer | Acerbas sarala | 1 | |
| Common redeye | Matapa aria | | |
| Fringed redeye | Matapa cresta | | |
| Grey-brand redeye | Matapa druna | | |
| Purple redeye | Matapa purpurascens | | |
| Black-veined redeye | Matapa sasivarna | | |
| Hoary palmer | Unkana ambasa | 1 | |
| Assamese yellow-vein lancer | Pyroneura margherita | 1 | |
| Red-vein lancer | Pyroneura niasana | 1 | |
| Indian palm bob | Suastus gremius | 1 | |
| Small palm bob | Suastus minutus | 3 | |
| Purple lancer | Salanoemia fuscicornis | | |
| Spotted yellow lancer | Salanoemia noemi | | |
| Maculate lancer | Salanoemia sala | | |
| Yellow-streaked lancer | Salanoemia tavoyana | 1 | |
| Silver-spotted lancer | Plastingia naga | | |
| Green-striped palmer | Pirdana hyela | 1 | |
| Plain green palmer | Pirdana distanti | 1 | |
| Tree flitter | Hyarotis adrastus | 1 | |
| Brush flitter | Hyarotis microstictum | 2 | |
| Golden flitter | Quedara basiflava | | |
| Dubious flitter | Quedara monteithi | 1 | |
| Forest bob | Scobura cephala | | |
| Large forest bob | Scobura cephaloides | 1 | |
| Swinhoe's forest bob | Scobura isota | | |
| Assam forest bob | Scobura parawoolletti | | |
| Malay forest bob | Scobura phiditia | | |
| Tytler's forest bob | Scobura tytleri | | |
| Grass bob | Suada swerga | 1 | |
| Spotted redeye | Pudicitia pholus | | |

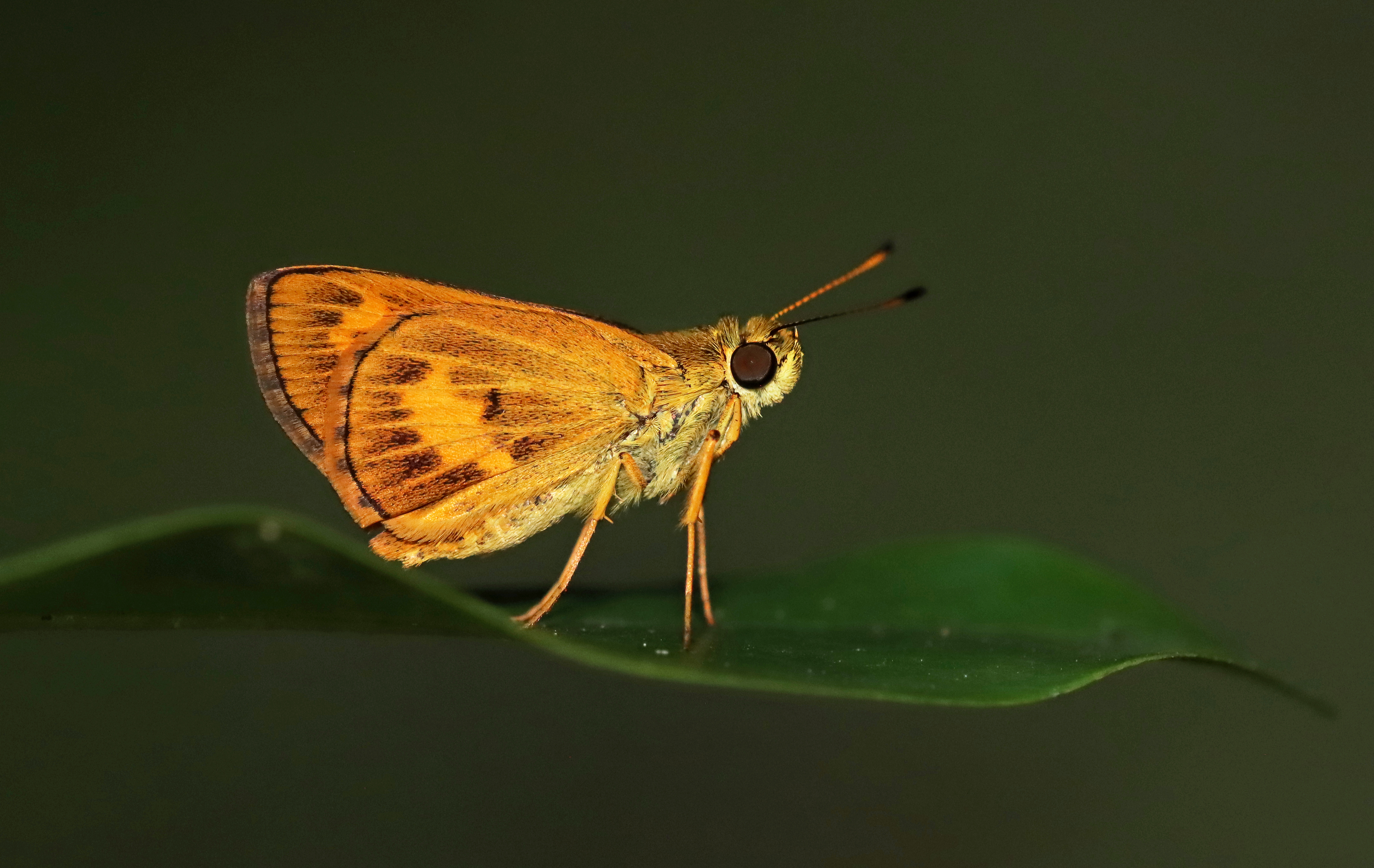
Common dartlet, Oriens gola

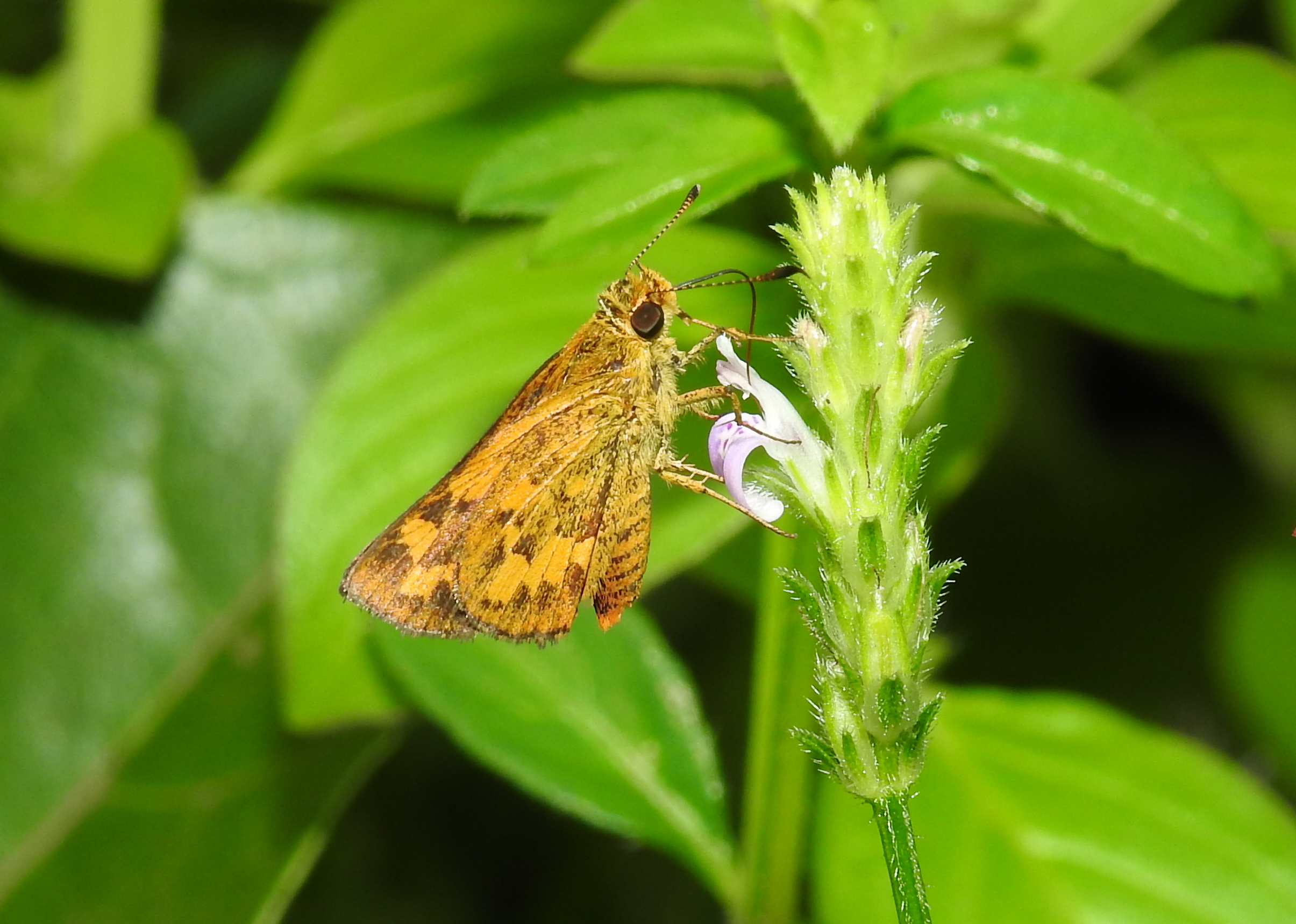
Indian dart, Potanthus pseudomaesa

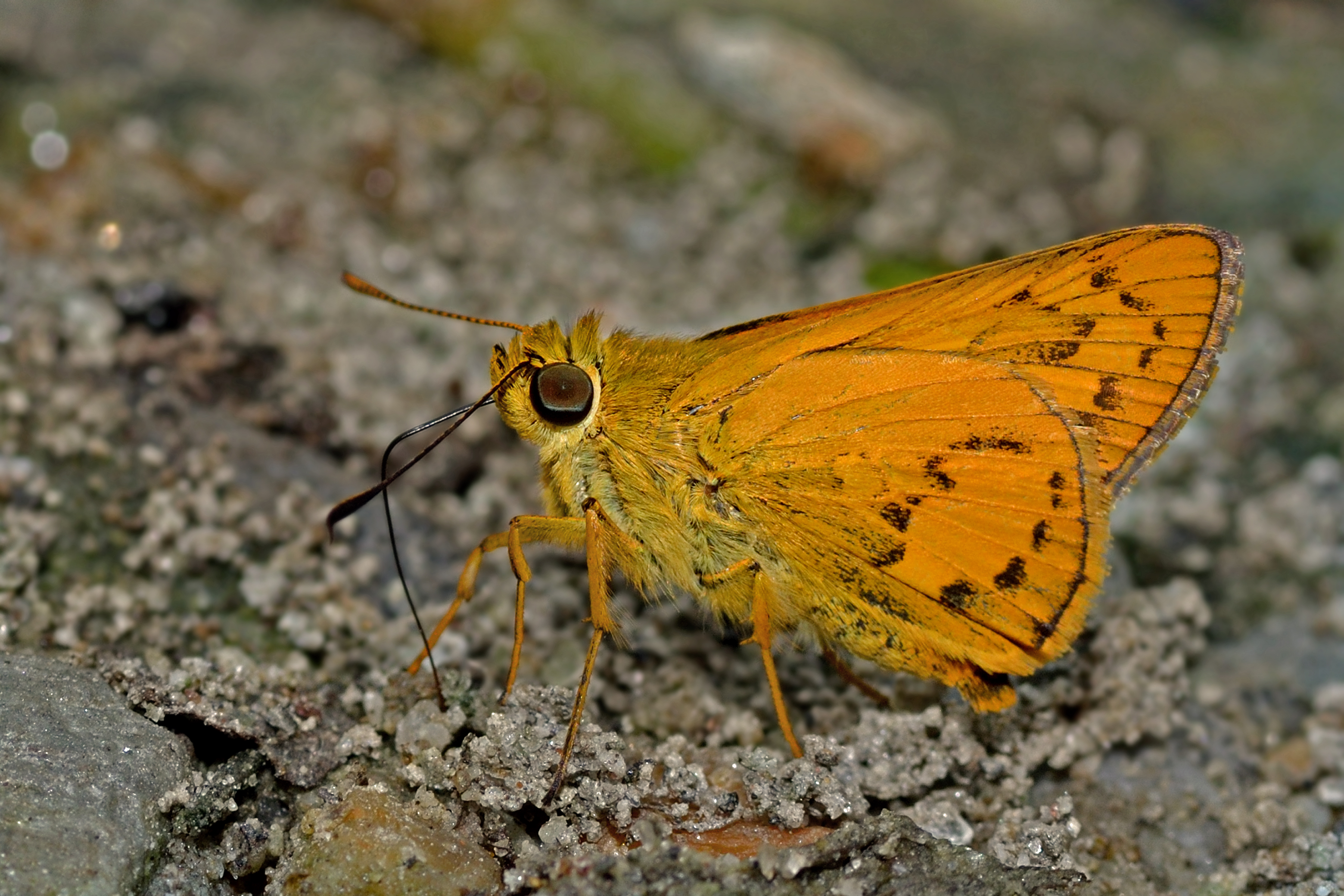
Dark palm dart, Telicota bambusae

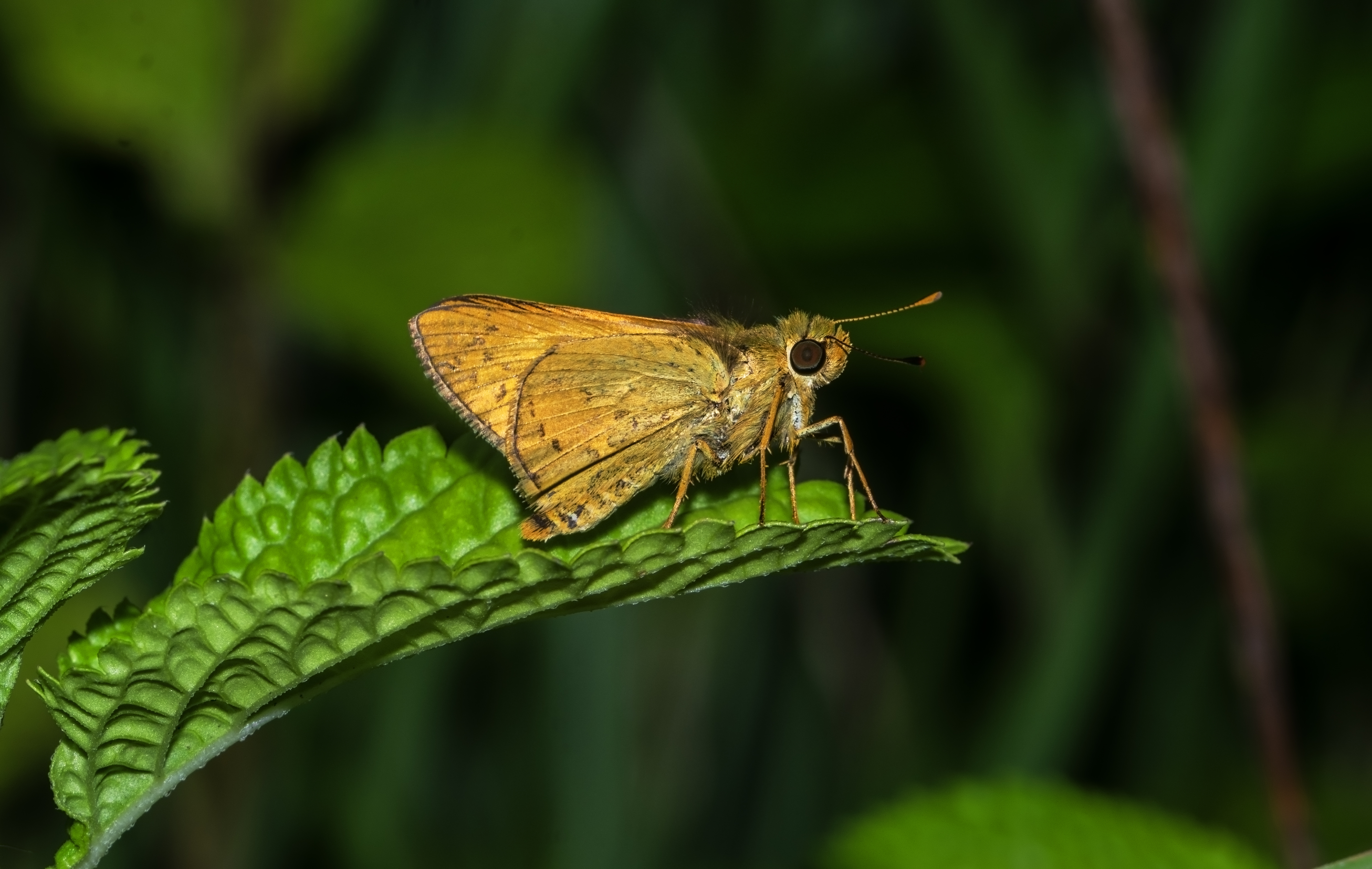
Common palm dart, Telicota colon

==== Taractrocerini ====
| Common name | Binomial name | Subspecies (in India) | Comments |
|---|---|---|---|
| Tamil dartlet | Oriens concinna | | Endemic |
| Common dartlet | Oriens gola | 2 | |
| Ceylon dartlet | Oriens goloides | | |
| Malay dartlet | Oriens paragola | | |
| Tamil grass dart | Taractrocera ceramas | 5 | |
| Himalayan grass dart | Taractrocera danna | | |
| Common grass dart | Taractrocera maevius | 1 | |
| Chinese dart | Potanthus confucius | 3 | |
| Himalayan dart | Potanthus dara | | |
| Japanese dart | Potanthus flava | 1 | |
| Sumatran dart | Potanthus ganda | 1 | |
| Burmese dart | Potanthus juno | | |
| Forest dart | Potanthus lydia | 1 | |
| Sikkim dart | Potanthus mara | 1 | |
| Narrow bi-dent dart | Potanthus mingo | 1 | |
| Brandless dart | Potanthus nesta | 1 | |
| Pale dart | Potanthus pallida | | |
| Palni dart | Potanthus palnia | 1 | |
| Yellow dart | Potanthus pava | 1 | |
| Indian dart | Potanthus pseudomaesa | 2 | |
| Branded dart | Potanthus rectifasciatus | | |
| Large dart | Potanthus serina | 1 | |
| Yellow-and-black dart | Potanthus sita | | |
| Broad bi-dent dart | Potanthus trachala | 2 | |
| Pale palm dart | Telicota augias | 1 | |
| Dark palm dart | Telicota bambusae | 1 | |
| Large palm dart | Telicota besta | | |
| Common palm dart | Telicota colon | 3 | |
| Evans' palm dart | Telicota linna | | |
| Narrow-banded palm dart | Telicota ohara | 1 | |
| Plain palm dart | Cephrenes acalle | 2 | |

== Pieridae ==
The Pieridae or the white, yellow and sulphur butterflies are a family of about 1050 species. Most members of the family are white or yellow in colour. Butterflies of this family are attracted to wet mud. There are 101 species of this family found in India.

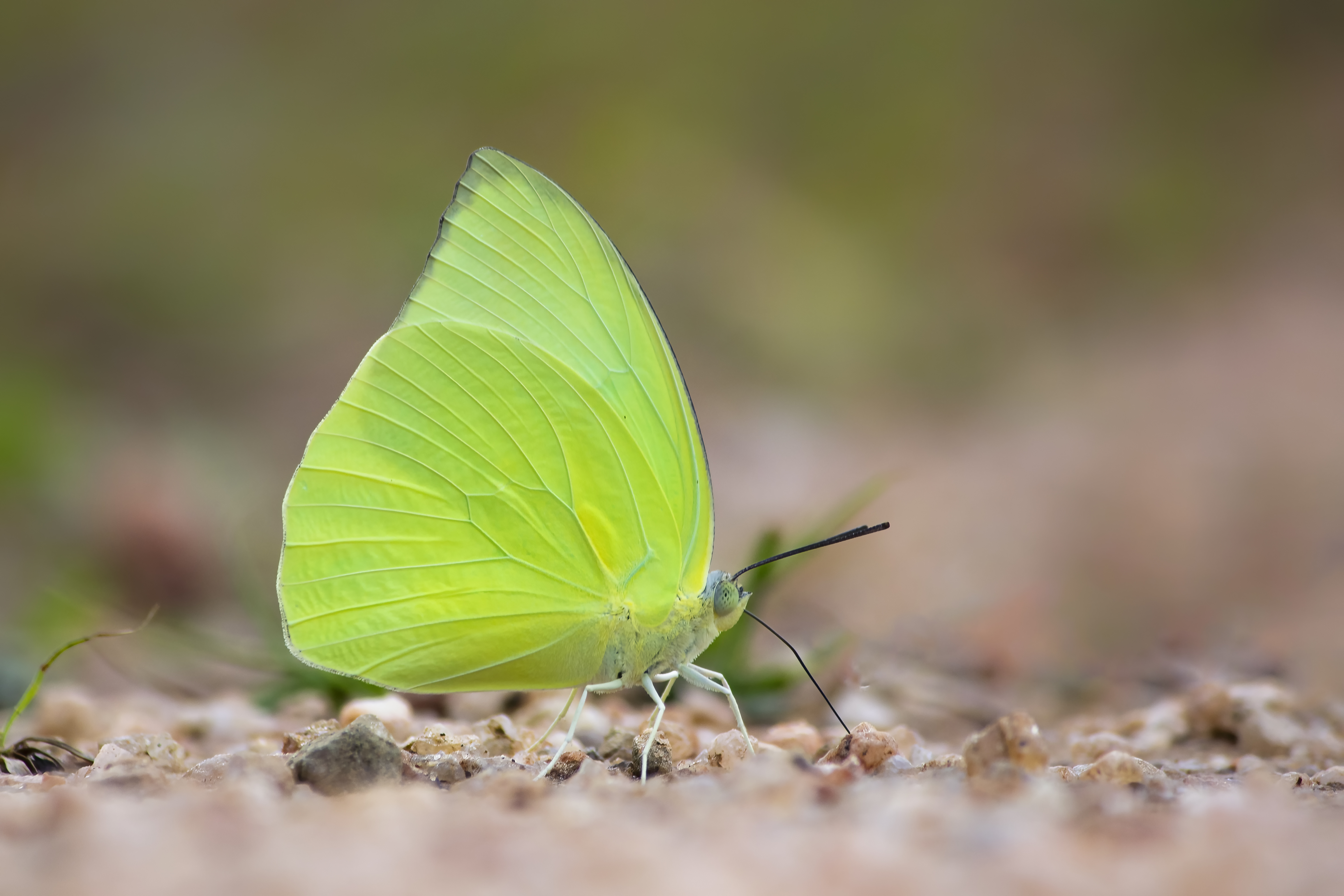
Lemon emigrant, Catopsilia pomona

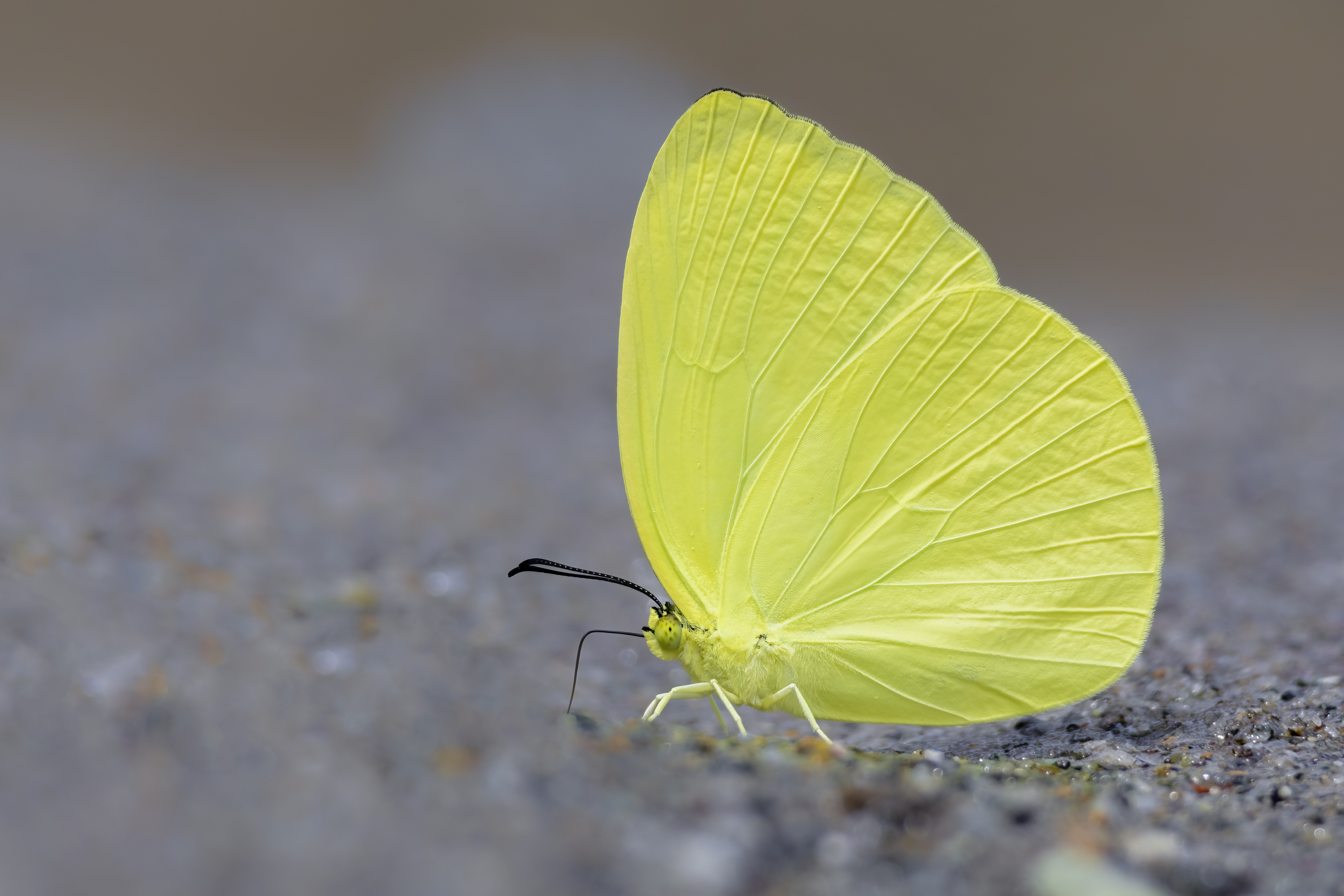
Tree yellow, Gandaca harina

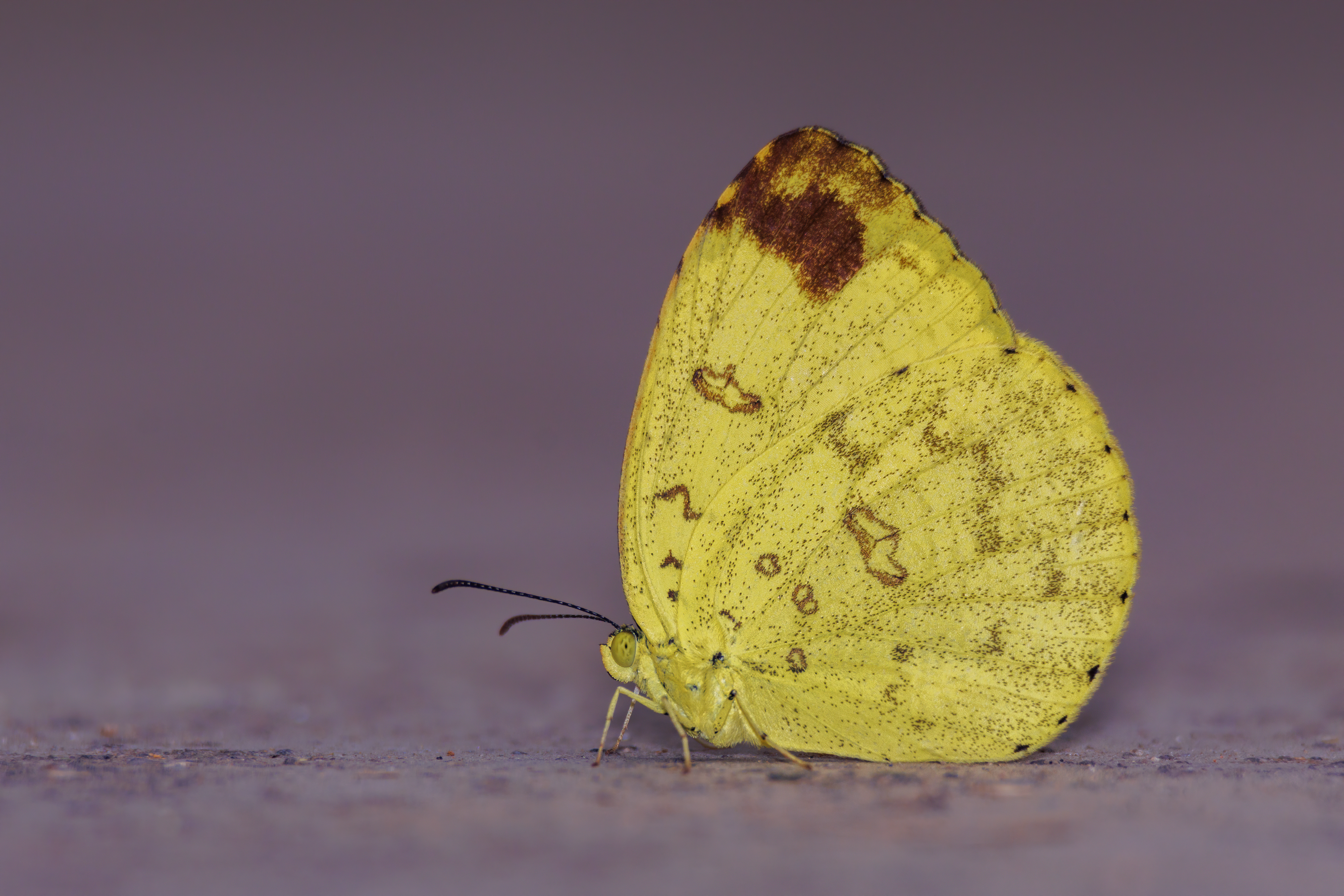
Three-spotted grass yellow, Eurema blanda

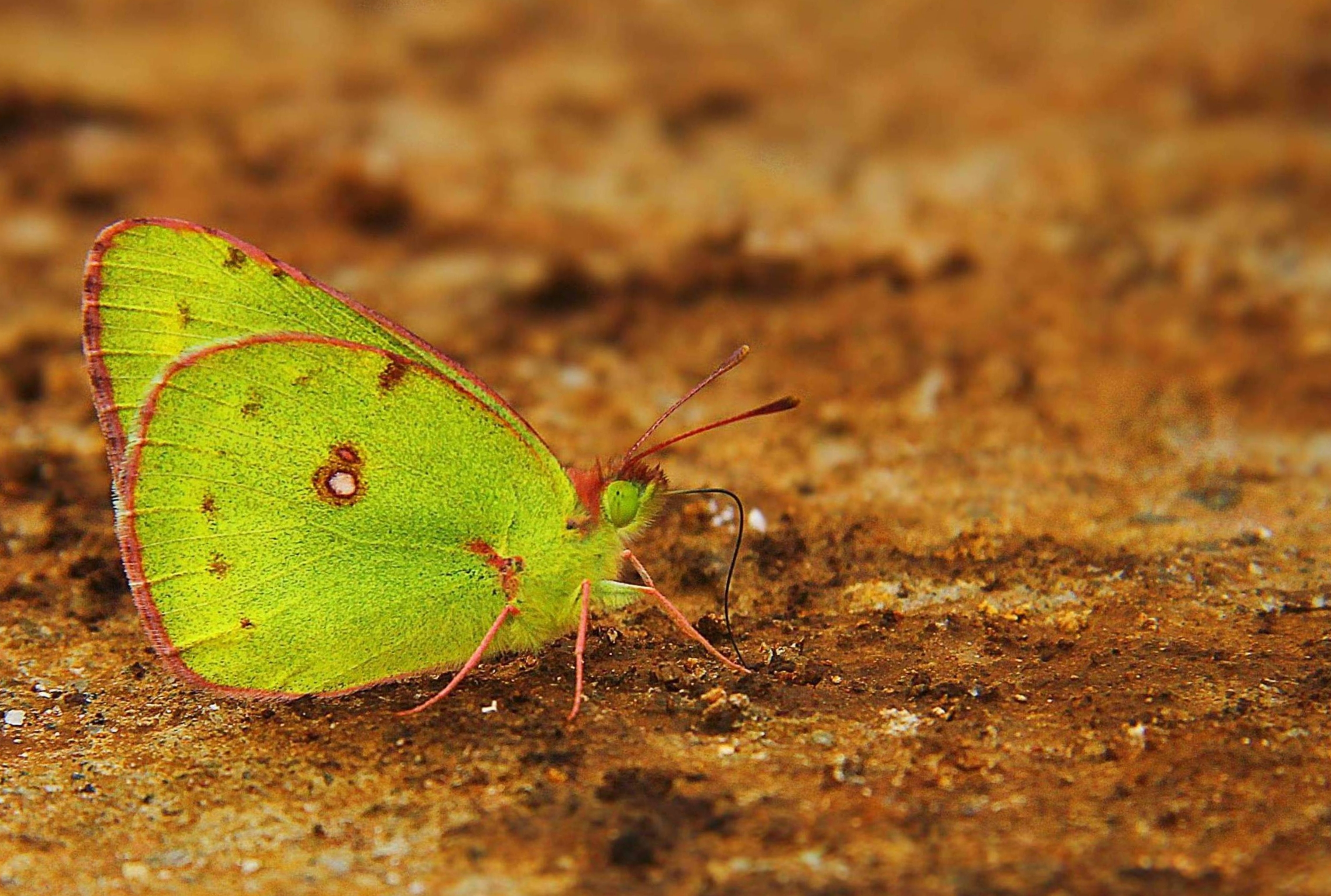
Nilgiri clouded yellow, Colias nilagiriensis

=== Coliadinae ===
| Common name | Binomial name | Subspecies (in India) | Comments |
|---|---|---|---|
| Lemon emigrant | Catopsilia pomona | 1 | |
| Mottled emigrant | Catopsilia pyranthe | 1 | |
| Orange emigrant | Catopsilia scylla | 1 | |
| Tailed sulphur | Dercas verhuelli | 1 | |
| Plain sulphur | Dercas lycorias | 1 | Schedule 2 |
| Tibet brimstone | Gonepteryx amintha | 1 | |
| Karakoram brimstone | Gonepteryx chitralensis | | |
| Lesser brimstone | Gonepteryx mahaguru | 1 | |
| Himalayan brimstone | Gonepteryx nepalensis | 2 | |
| Tree yellow | Gandaca harina | 3 | |
| One-spot grass yellow | Eurema andersonii | 3 | Schedule 2 |
| Three-spotted grass yellow | Eurema blanda | 4 | |
| Small grass yellow | Eurema drona | 1 | |
| Common grass yellow | Eurema hecabe | 1 | |
| Spotless grass yellow | Eurema laeta | 2 | |
| Nilgiri grass yellow | Eurema nilgiriensis | | Endemic |
| Scarce grass yellow | Eurema simulatrix | 1 | |
| Green clouded yellow | Colias alpherakii | 1 | |
| Everest clouded yellow | Colias berylla | 1 | |
| Pamir clouded yellow | Colias cocandica | 1 | |
| Dwarf clouded yellow | Colias dubia | | |
| Fiery clouded yellow | Colias eogene | 2 | Schedule 2 |
| Pale clouded yellow | Colias erate | | |
| Dark clouded yellow | Colias fieldii | 1 | |
| Ladakh clouded yellow | Colias ladakensis | | Schedule 2 |
| Glaucous clouded yellow | Colias leechi | 1 | |
| Marcopolo's clouded yellow | Colias marcopolo | 1 | |
| Nilgiri clouded yellow | Colias nilagiriensis | | Endemic |
| Fawcett's clouded yellow | Colias nina | 1 | |
| Orange clouded yellow | Colias stoliczkana | 2 | Schedule 2 |
| Lemon clouded yellow | Colias thrasibulus | 1 | |
| Broad-bordered clouded yellow | Colias wiskotti | 1 | |

=== Pierinae ===
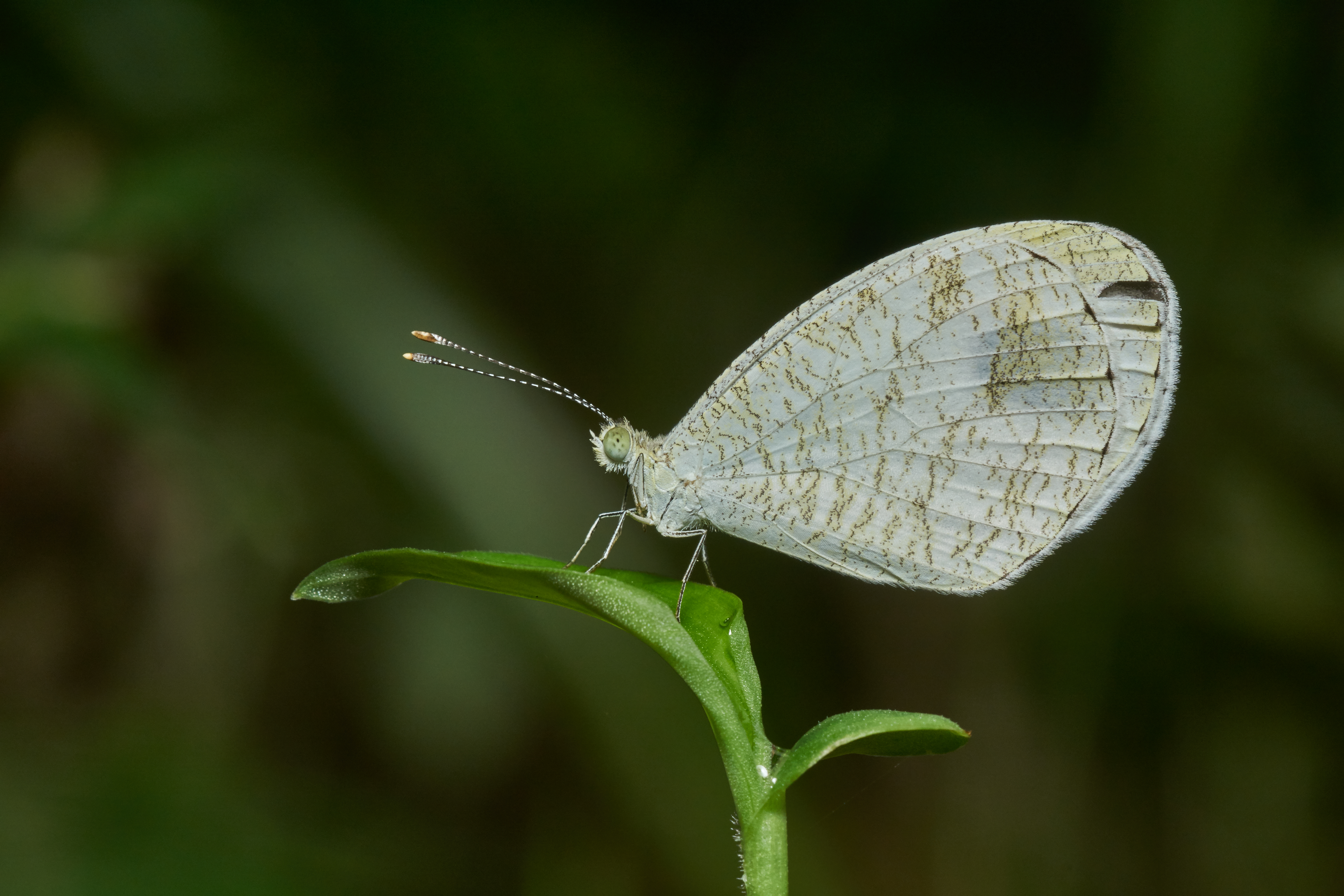
Psyche, Leptosia nina

==== Leptosiaini ====
| Common name | Binomial name | Subspecies (in India) | Comments |
|---|---|---|---|
| Psyche | Leptosia nina | 2 | |

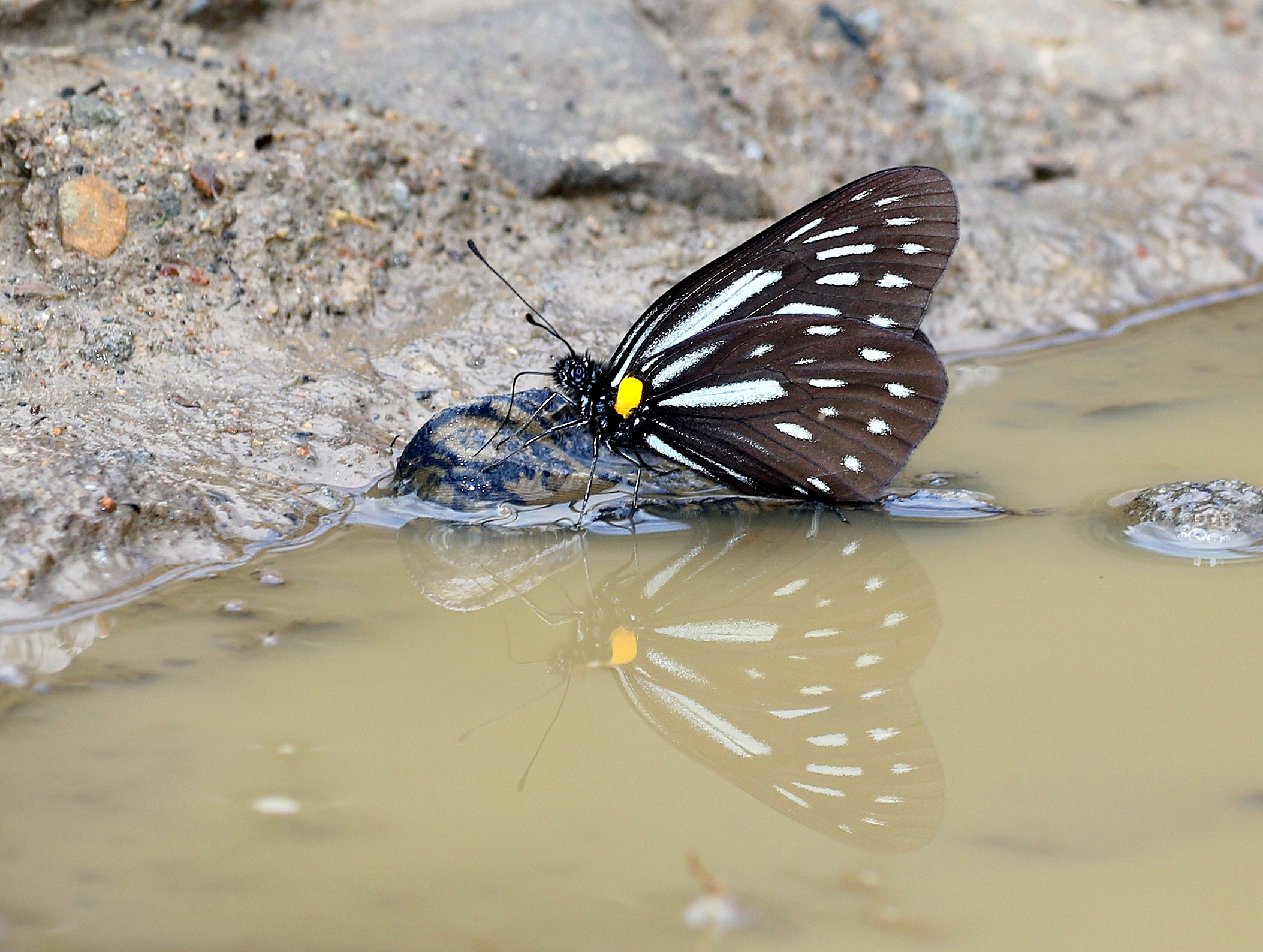
Great blackvein, Aporia agathon

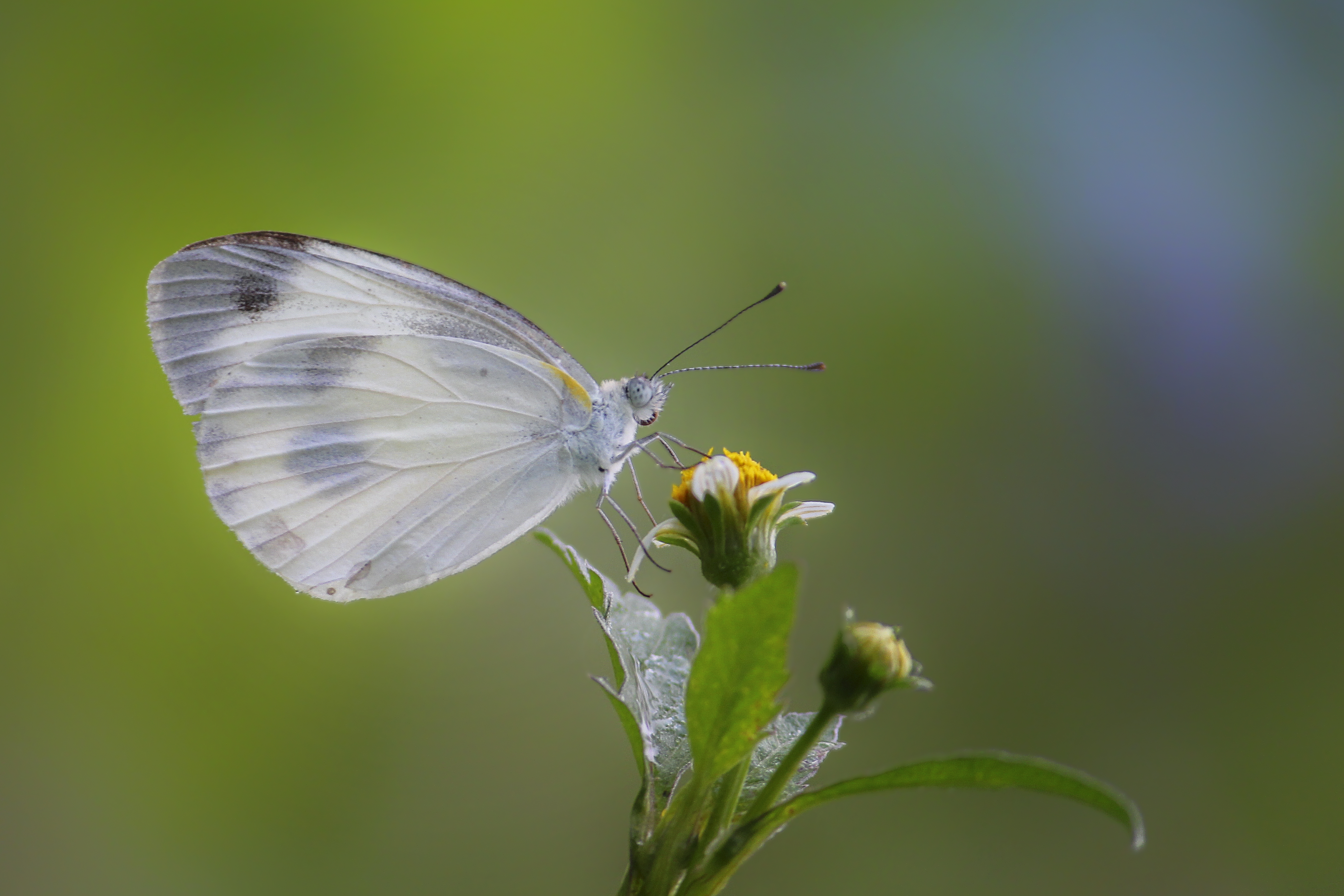
Indian cabbage white, Pieris canidia

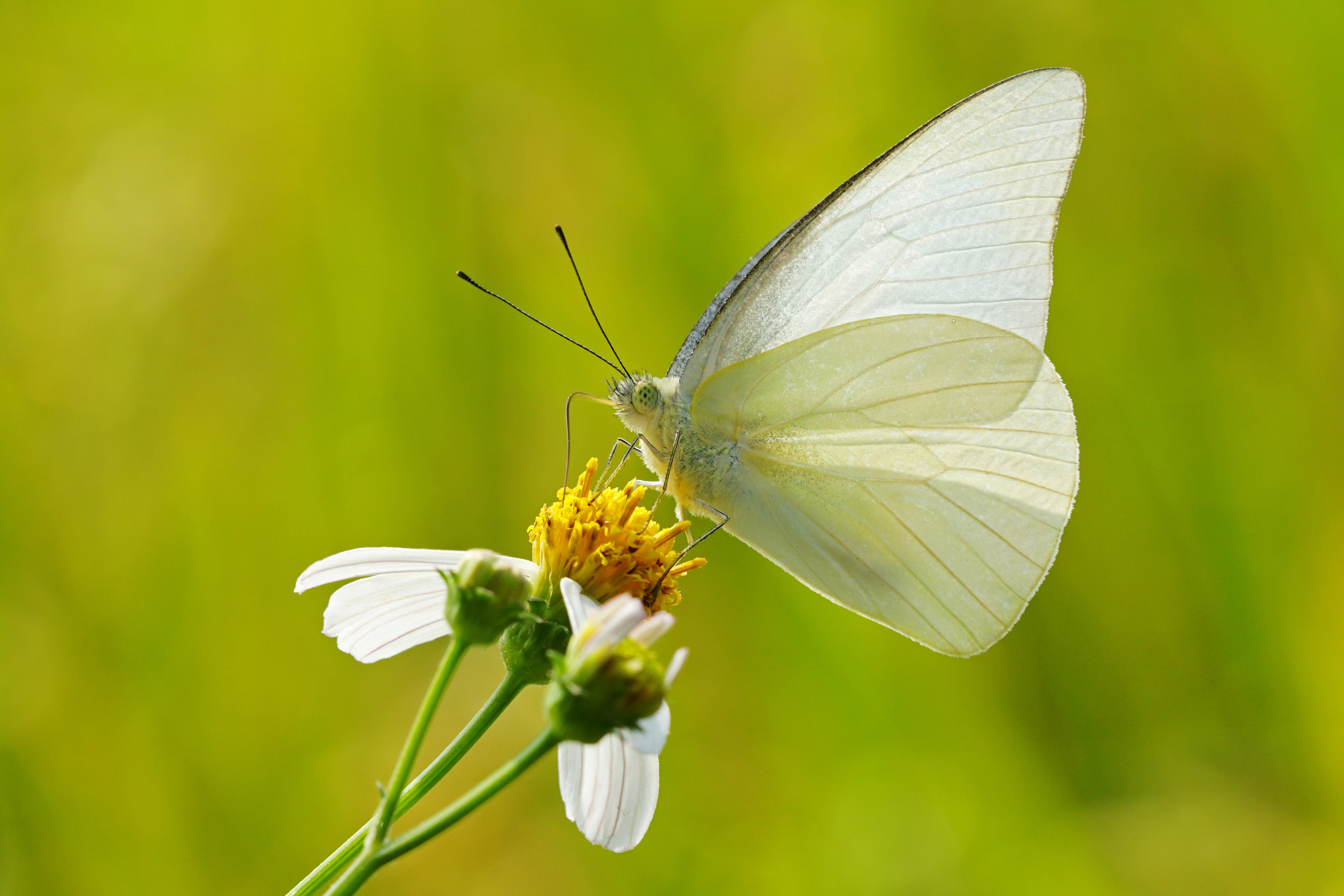
Common albatross, Appias albina

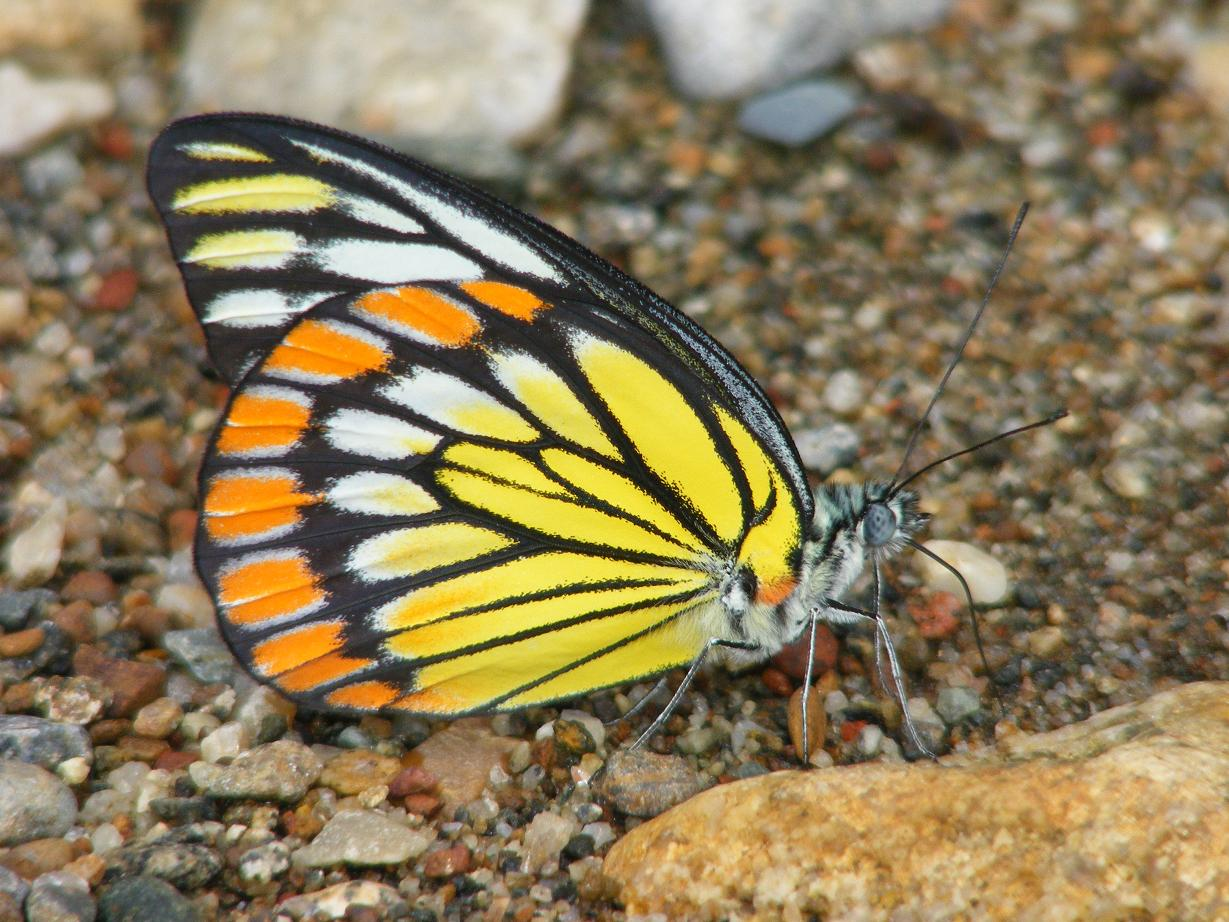
Painted sawtooth, Prioneris sita

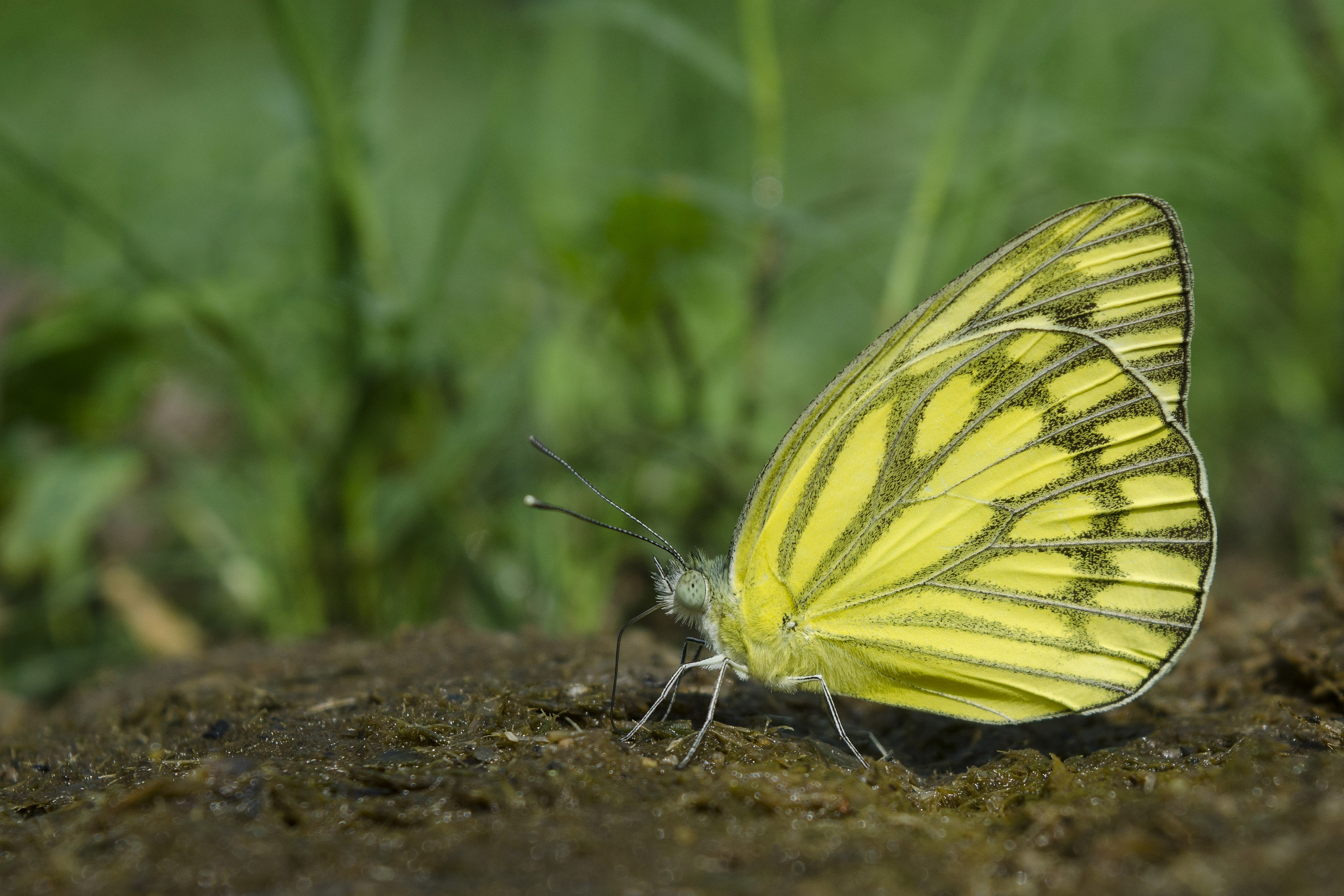
Common gull, Cepora nerissa

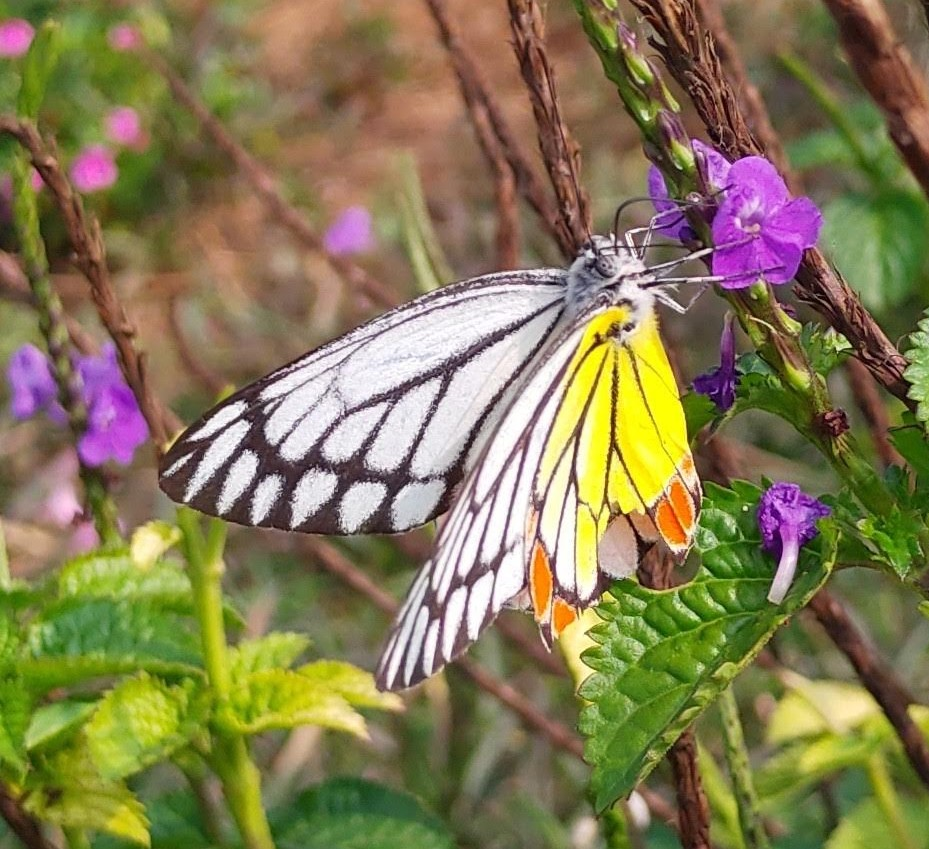
Common jezebel, Delias eucharis

==== Pierini ====
| Common name | Binomial name | Subspecies (in India) | Comments |
|---|---|---|---|
| Great blackvein | Aporia agathon | 3 | |
| Baluchi blackvein | Aporia belucha | 1 | |
| Yunnan black-veined white | Aporia goutellei | | |
| Bhutan blackvein | Aporia harrietae | 1 | Schedule 2 |
| Naga blackvein | Aporia japfuensis | | |
| Dusky blackvein | Aporia nabellica | 3 | Schedule 2 |
| Mishmi blackvein | Aporia omotoi | | |
| Thibet blackvein | Aporia peloria | 1 | |
| Himalayan blackvein | Aporia soracta | 2 | |
| Himalayan white | Pieris ajaka | 2 | |
| Large cabbage white | Pieris brassicae | 1 | |
| Indian cabbage white | Pieris canidia | 2 | |
| Chumbi white | Pieris chumbiensis | 2 | |
| Kashmir white | Pieris deota | | Schedule 2 |
| Mizo white | Pieris erutae | 1 | |
| Bhutan white | Pieris extensa | 1 | |
| Green-banded white | Pieris krueperi | 1 | Schedule 1 |
| Small cabbage white | Pieris rapae | 1 | |
| Cryptic white | Pieris tadokoroi | | |
| Naga white | Talbotia naganum | 1 | |
| Butler's white | Pontia butleri | 2 | Schedule 1 |
| Lofty bath white | Pontia callidice | 1 | |
| Lesser bath white | Pontia chloridice | 1 | Schedule 2 |
| Greater bath white | Pontia edusa | 1 | |
| Desert bath white | Pontia glauconome | | |
| Shaw's dwarf | Pontia shawii | 1 | |
| Common albatross | Appias albina | 2 | Schedule 2 |
| Apricot albatross | Appias galba | | |
| Plain puffin | Appias indra | 2 | Schedule 2 |
| Spot puffin | Appias lalage | | |
| Western striped albatross | Appias libythea | 1 | |
| Eastern striped albatross | Appias olferna | 1 | |
| Chocolate albatross | Appias lyncida | 3 | Schedule 2 |
| Lesser albatross | Appias paulina | 2 | |
| South Indian albatross | Appias wardii | | Schedule 2 |
| Nicobar albatross | Catophaga panda | 1 | Endemic |
| Redspot sawtooth | Prioneris philonome | 1 | |
| Painted sawtooth | Prioneris sita | | |
| Spotted sawtooth | Prioneris thestylis | 1 | |
| Pioneer | Belenois aurota | 1 | |
| Andaman gull | Cepora lichenosa | | Endemic |
| Lesser gull | Cepora nadina | 3 | Schedule 2 |
| Common gull | Cepora nerissa | 2 | |
| Redbreast jezabel | Delias acalis | 2 | |
| Yellow jezabel | Delias agostina | 1 | |
| Hill jezabel | Delias belladonna | 3 | |
| Dark jezabel | Delias berinda | 3 | |
| Redspot jezabel | Delias descombesi | 1 | |
| Common jezabel | Delias eucharis | | |
| Painted jezabel | Delias hyparete | 3 | |
| Broadwing jezabel | Delias lativitta | 2 | Schedule 2 |
| Redbase jezabel | Delias pasithoe | 1 | |
| Pale jezabel | Delias sanaca | 3 | Schedule 1 |

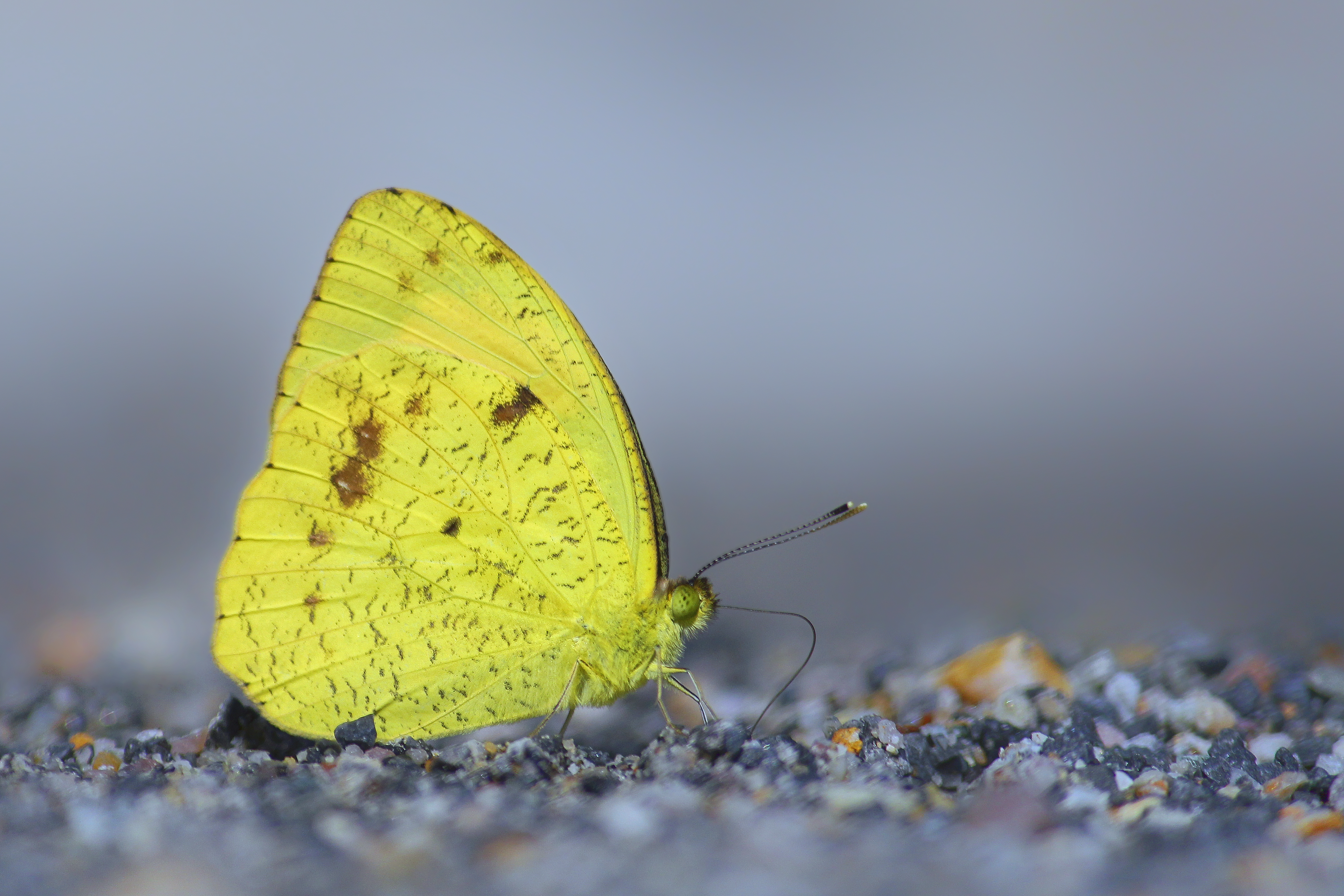
Yellow orange-tip, Ixias pyrene

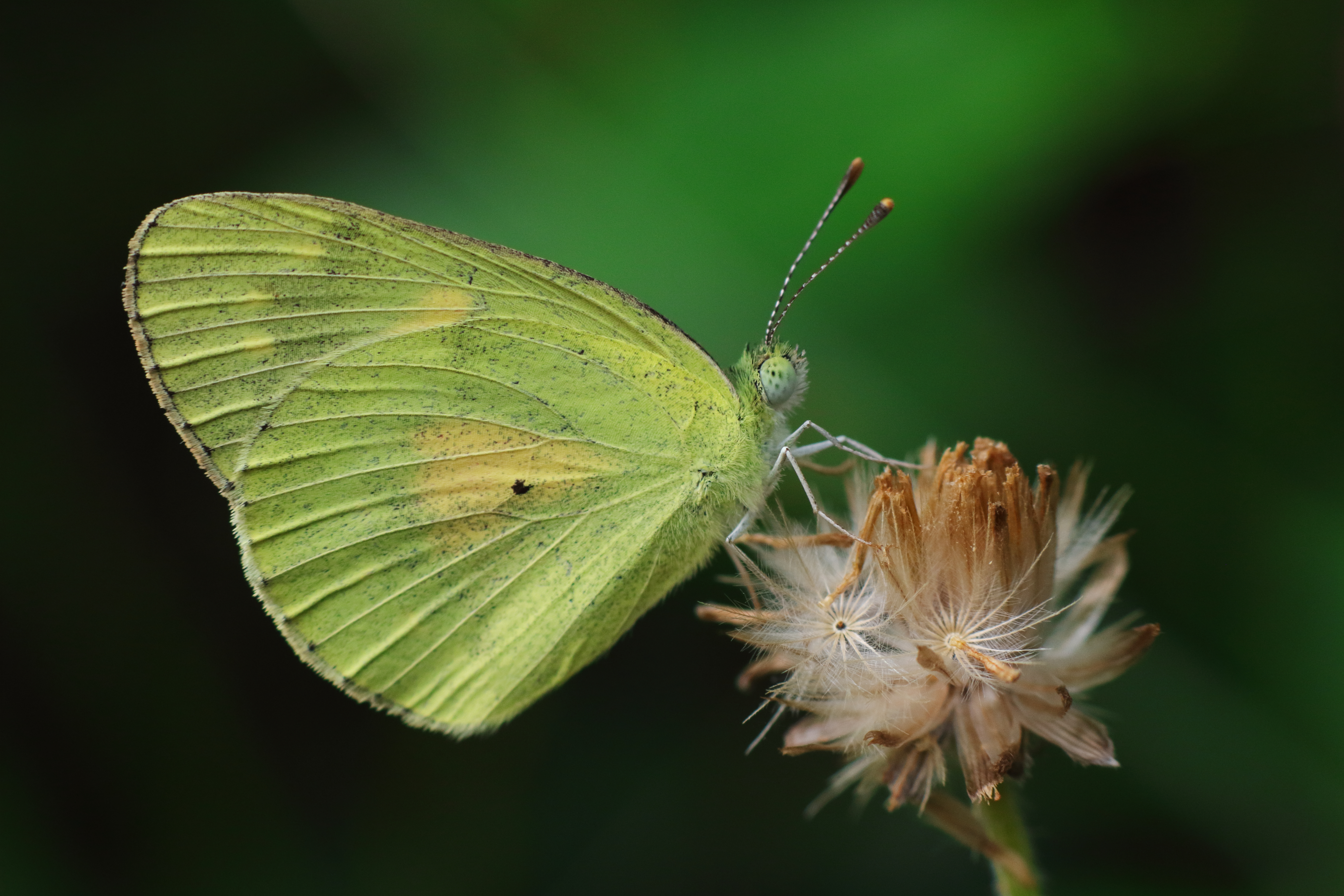
Small salmon arab, Colotis amata

==== Euchloeini ====
| Common name | Binomial name | Subspecies (in India) | Comments |
|---|---|---|---|
| Little white | Euchloe daphalis | 1 | |
| White orange tip | Ixias marianne | | |
| Yellow orange tip | Ixias pyrene | 4 | |
| Small salmon arab | Colotis amata | 2 | |
| Plain orange tip | Colotis aurora | 1 | |
| Crimson tip | Colotis danae | 1 | |
| Little orange tip | Colotis etrida | 1 | |
| Large salmon arab | Colotis fausta | 2 | |
| White arab | Colotis phisadia | 1 | |
| Blue-spotted arab | Colotis protractus | | |
| Indian wanderer | Pareronia anais | 2 | |
| Pale wanderer | Pareronia avatar | | Schedule 2 |
| Dark wanderer | Pareronia ceylanica | 1 | |
| Great orange tip | Hebomoia glaucippe | 3 | |
| Andaman great orange tip | Hebomoia roepstorfii | | Endemic |

== Riodinidae ==
The Riodinidae or the metalmark butterflies are a family of about 1600 species. The name "metalmark" owes to the metallic spots on the Neotropical members of this family. There are 21 species of this family found in India.

=== Riodininae ===
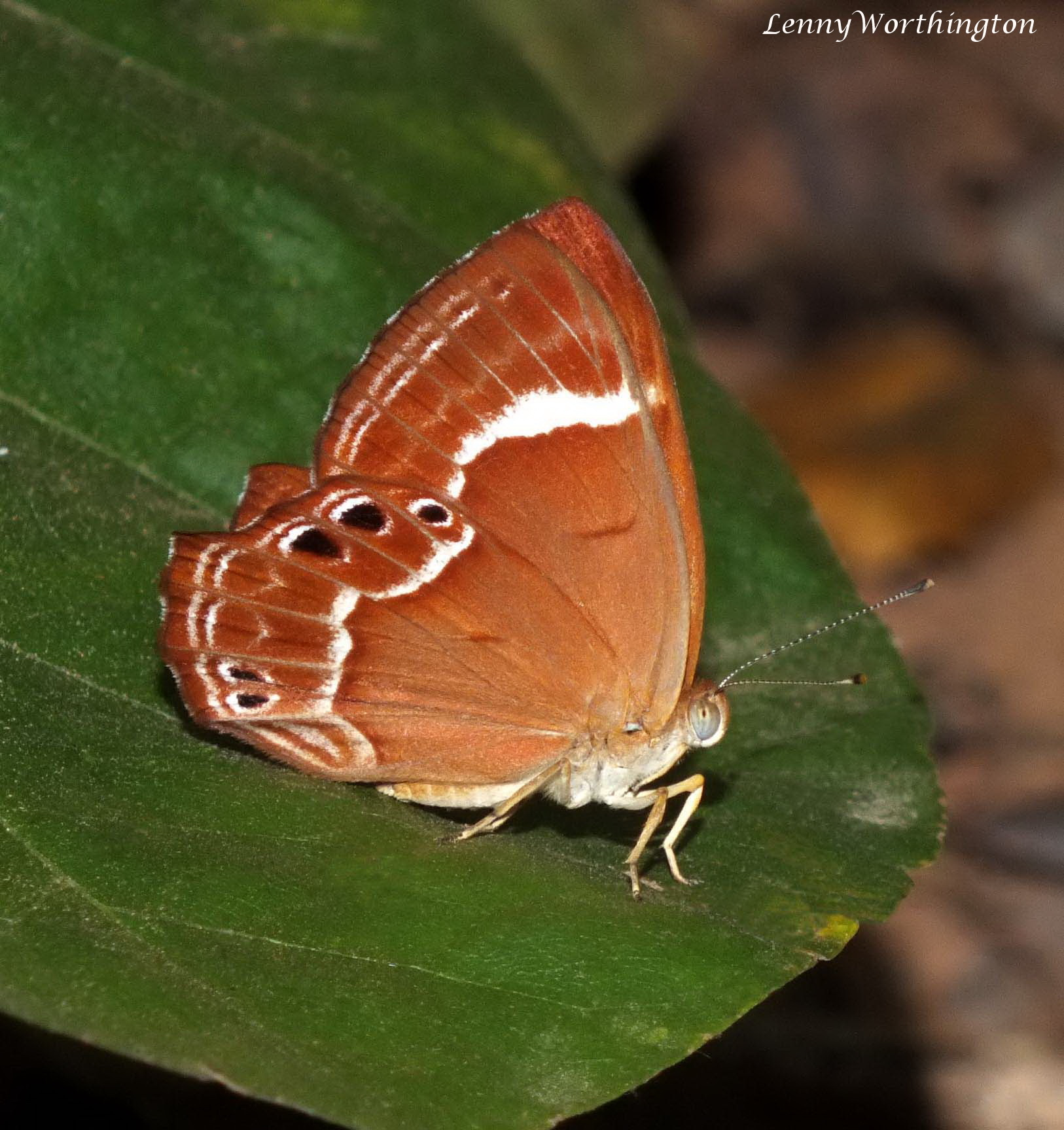
Abnormal judy, Abisara abnormis

==== Abisarini ====
| Common name | Binomial name | Subspecies (in India) | Comments |
|---|---|---|---|
| Abnormal judy | Abisara abnormis | | |
| Double-banded judy | Abisara bifasciata | 3 | |
| Plum judy | Abisara echerius | 2 | |
| Malayan plum judy | Abisara saturata | 1 | |
| Harlequin | Taxila haquinus | 1 | |
| Burn's judy | Sibosia burnii | | |
| Short-tailed judy | Archigenes attenuata | | |
| Spot judy | Archigenes chela | 2 | |
| Tailed judy | Archigenes neophron | 2 | |

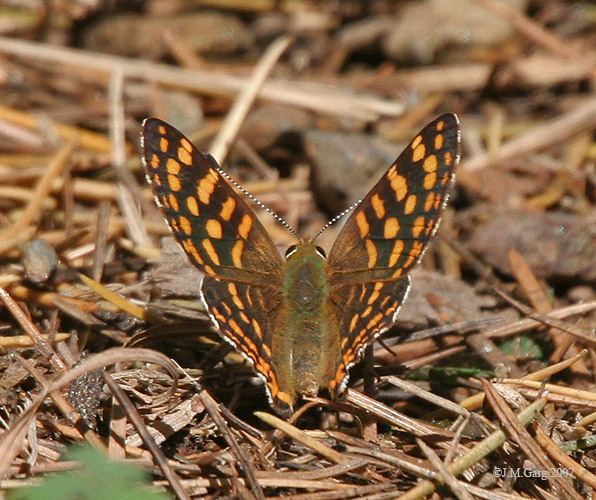
Common punch, Dodona durga

==== Nemeobiini ====
| Common name | Binomial name | Subspecies (in India) | Comments |
|---|---|---|---|
| Tamerlane's coppermark | Polycaena tamerlana | 1 | |
| Striped punch | Dodona adonira | 2 | Schedule 2 |
| Broad-banded punch | Dodona deodata | 1 | |
| Lesser punch | Dodona dipoea | 2 | Schedule 2 |
| Common punch | Dodona durga | 1 | |
| Orange punch | Dodona egeon | 1 | Schedule 2 |
| Tailed punch | Dodona eugenes | 2 | |
| Mixed punch | Dodona ouida | 2 | |
| Dark judy | Spitosa fylla | | |
| Mountain columbine | Stiboges elodinia | | |
| Columbine | Stiboges nymphidia | 1 | |
| Punchinello | Zemeros flegyas | 1 | |

== Lycaenidae ==
The Lycaenidae or the gossamer-winged butterflies are a large family of about 6000 species. They are a group of relatively small butterflies, and most species are attracted to flowers. There are 402 species of this family found in India.

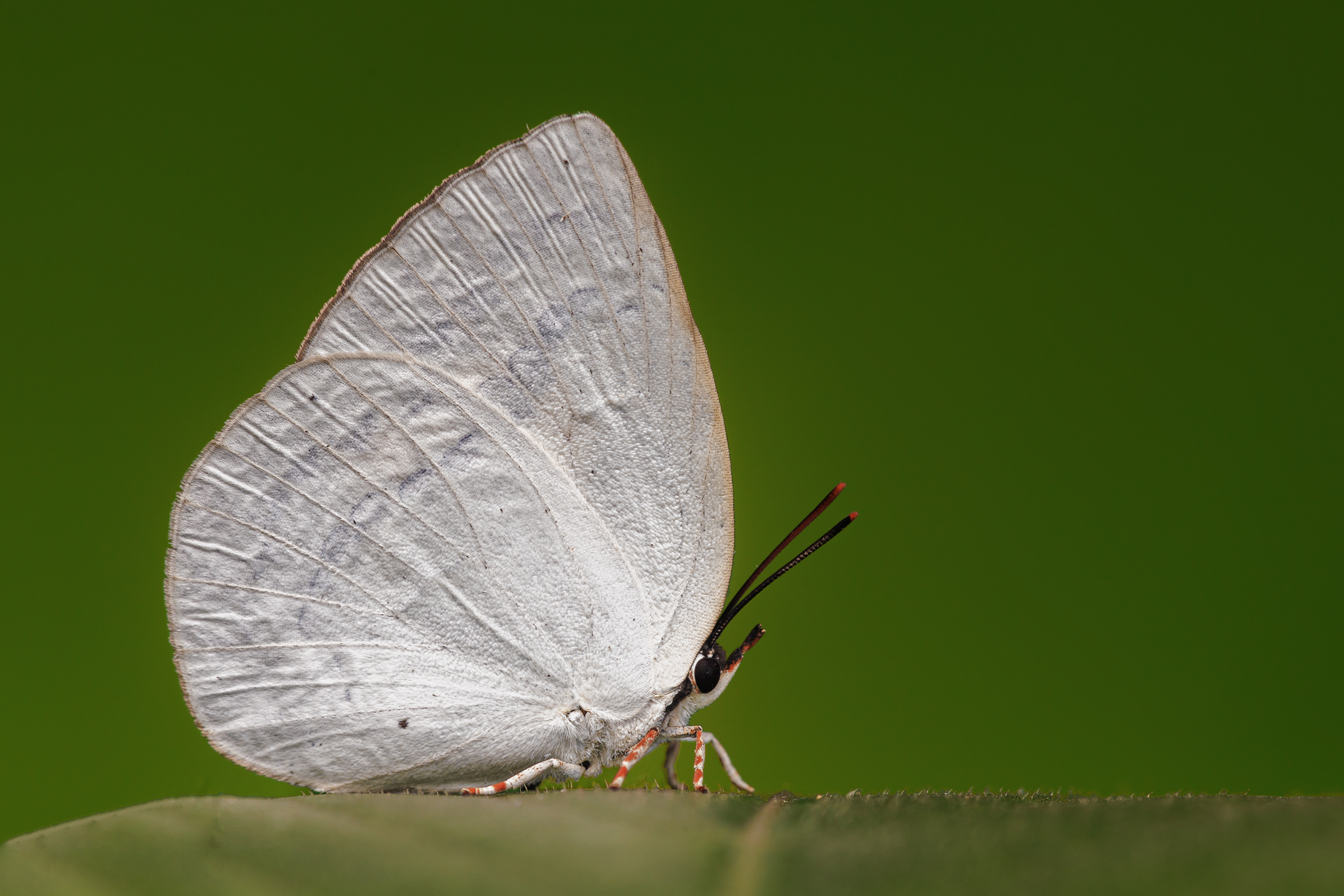
Indian sunbeam, Curetis thetis

=== Curetinae ===
| Common name | Binomial name | Subspecies (in India) | Comments |
|---|---|---|---|
| Angled sunbeam | Curetis acuta | 1 | |
| Bright sunbeam | Curetis bulis | 1 | |
| Naga sunbeam | Curetis naga | | |
| Burmese sunbeam | Curetis saronis | 5 | |
| Shiva sunbeam | Curetis siva | | |
| Indian sunbeam | Curetis thetis | 1 | |

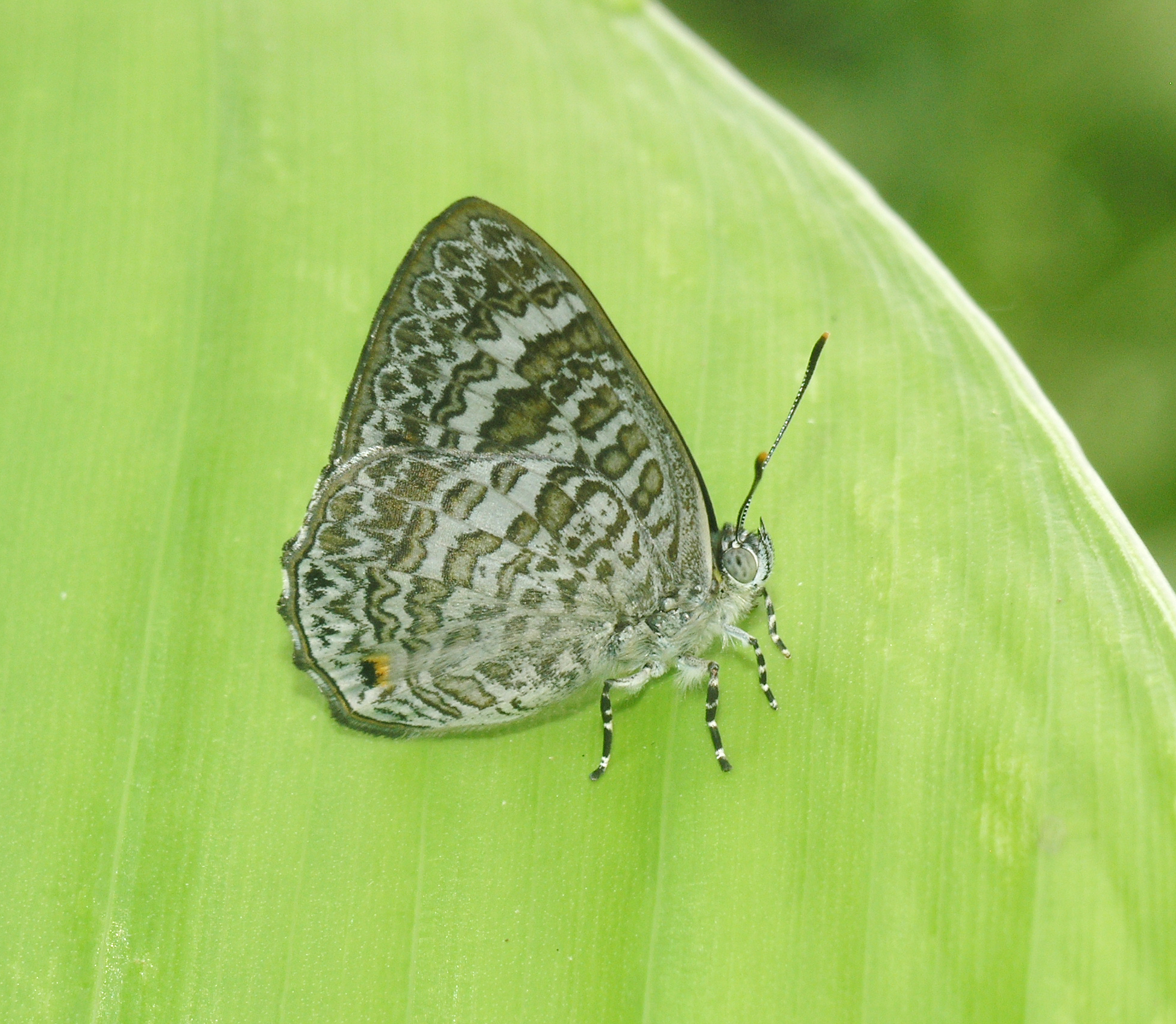
Blue gem, Poritia erycinoides

=== Poritinae ===
| Common name | Binomial name | Subspecies (in India) | Comments |
|---|---|---|---|
| Blue gem | Poritia erycinoides | 1 | Schedule 2 |
| Common gem | Poritia hewitsoni | 1 | Schedule 2 |
| Broad-banded brilliant | Simiskina phalena | 1 | Schedule 1 |

=== Liphyrinae ===
| Common name | Binomial name | Subspecies (in India) | Comments |
|---|---|---|---|
| Moth butterfly | Liphyra brassolis | 1 | Schedule 1 |

=== Miletinae ===
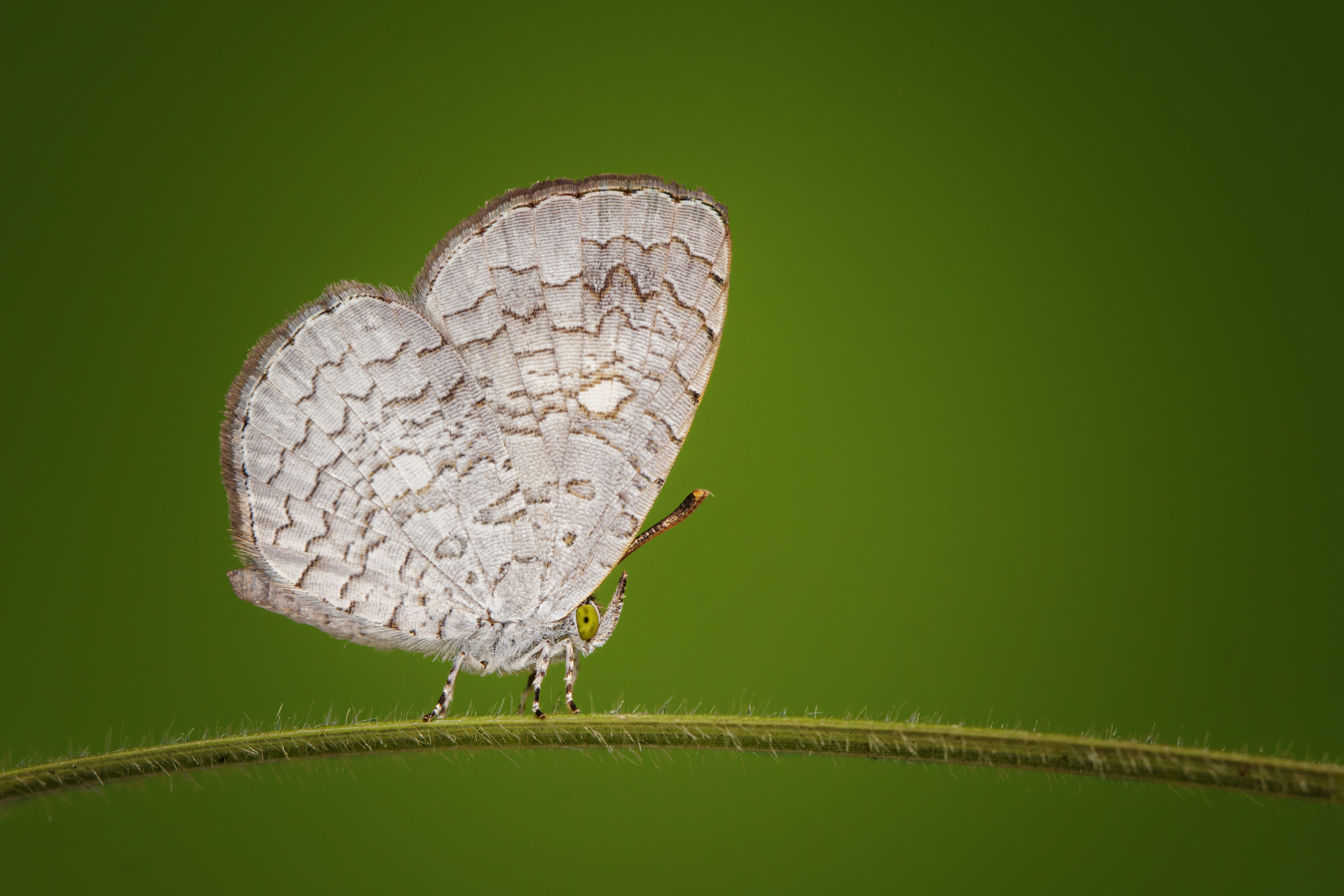
Apefly, Spalgis epius

==== Miletini ====
| Common name | Binomial name | Subspecies (in India) | Comments |
|---|---|---|---|
| Great darkie | Allotinus drumila | 1 | Schedule 1 |
| Blue darkie | Allotinus subviolaceus | 1 | Schedule 2 |
| Brown-tipped darkie | Allotinus taras | | |
| Common darkie | Allotinus unicolor | 1 | |
| Dark mottle | Logania distanti | 1 | Schedule 2 |
| Pale mottle | Logania marmorata | 1 | |
| Watson's mottle | Logania watsoniana | | Schedule 1 |
| Common brownie | Miletus chinensis | 2 | Schedule 1 |
| Manipur brownie | Miletus mallus | | |
| Coorg brownie | Miletus nymphis | 1 | |
| Forest pierrot | Taraka hamada | 1 | |
| Assam apefly | Spalgis baiongus | | |
| Apefly | Spalgis epius | 1 | |

=== Lycaeninae ===
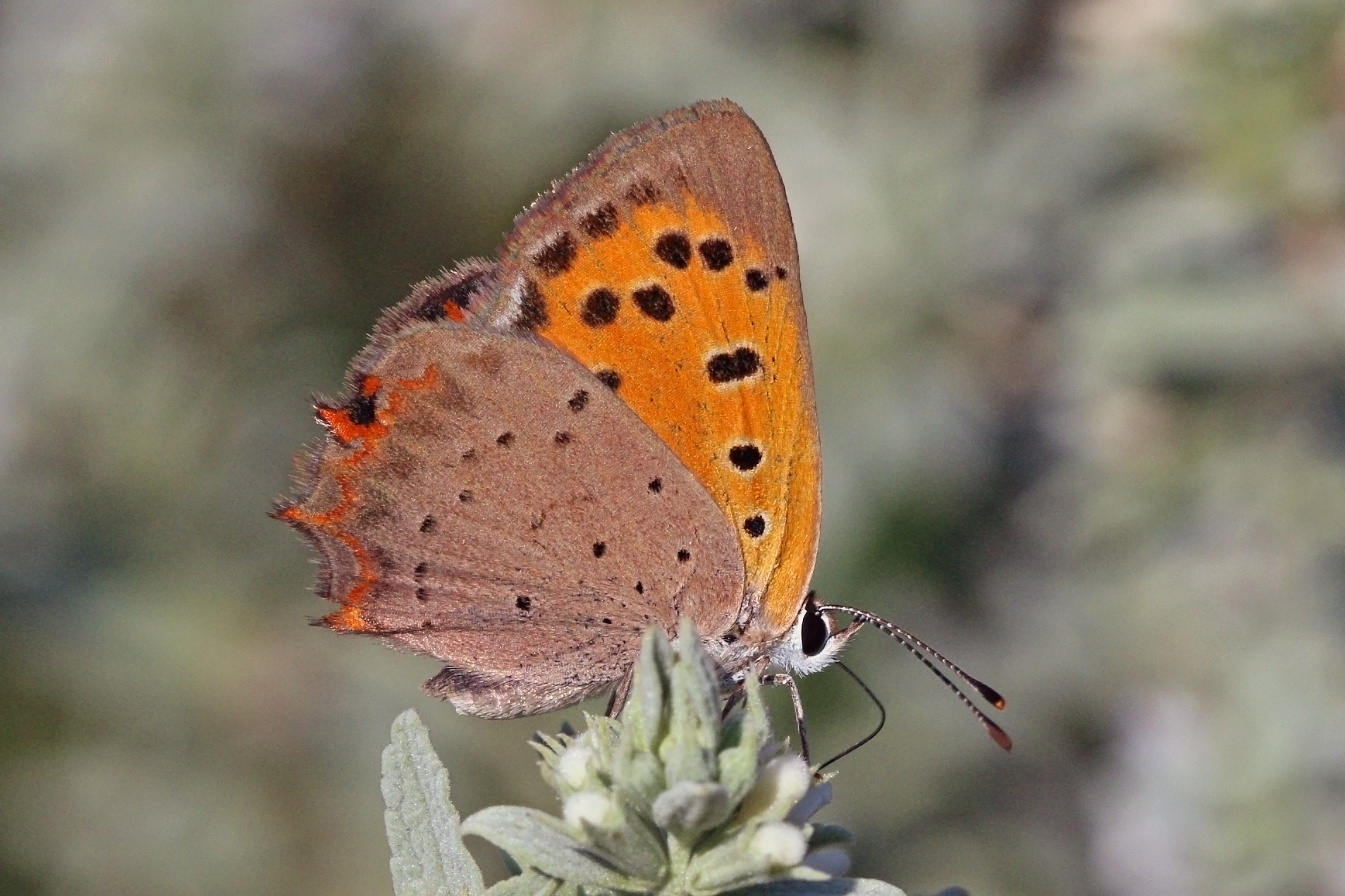
Common copper, Lycaena phleas

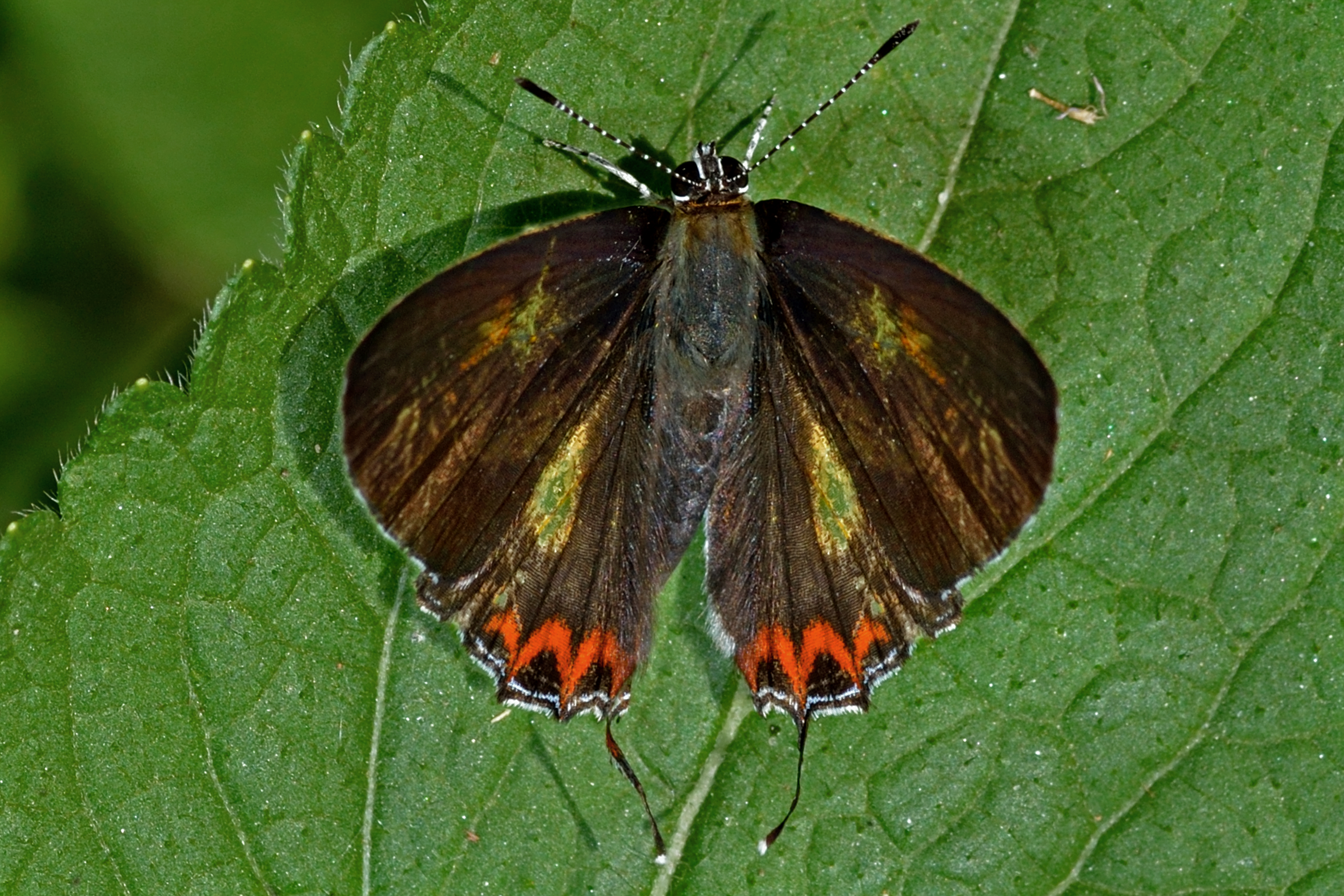
Golden sapphire, Heliophorus brahma

==== Lycaenini ====
| Common name | Binomial name | Subspecies (in India) | Comments |
|---|---|---|---|
| Ladakh copper | Lycaena aditya | 1 | |
| Plain copper | Lycaena alpherakii | | |
| Green copper | Lycaena kasyapa | 1 | |
| White-bordered copper | Lycaena pavana | | |
| Common copper | Lycaena phlaeas | 4 | |
| Chitral purple copper | Hyrcanana evansii | | |
| Green sapphire | Heliophorus androcles | 2 | Schedule 2 |
| Western blue sapphire | Heliophorus bakeri | | |
| Golden sapphire | Heliophorus brahma | 1 | |
| Purple sapphire | Heliophorus epicles | 1 | |
| Hybrid sapphire | Heliophorus hybrida | | Schedule 1 |
| Restricted purple sapphire | Heliophorus ila | 1 | |
| Indian purple sapphire | Heliophorus indicus | | |
| Naga sapphire | Heliophorus kohimensis | 1 | Schedule 2 |
| Azure sapphire | Heliophorus moorei | 2 | Schedule 2 |
| Eastern blue sapphire | Heliophorus oda | | |
| Sorrel sapphire | Heliophorus sena | | |
| Powdery green sapphire | Heliophorus tamu | 2 | |

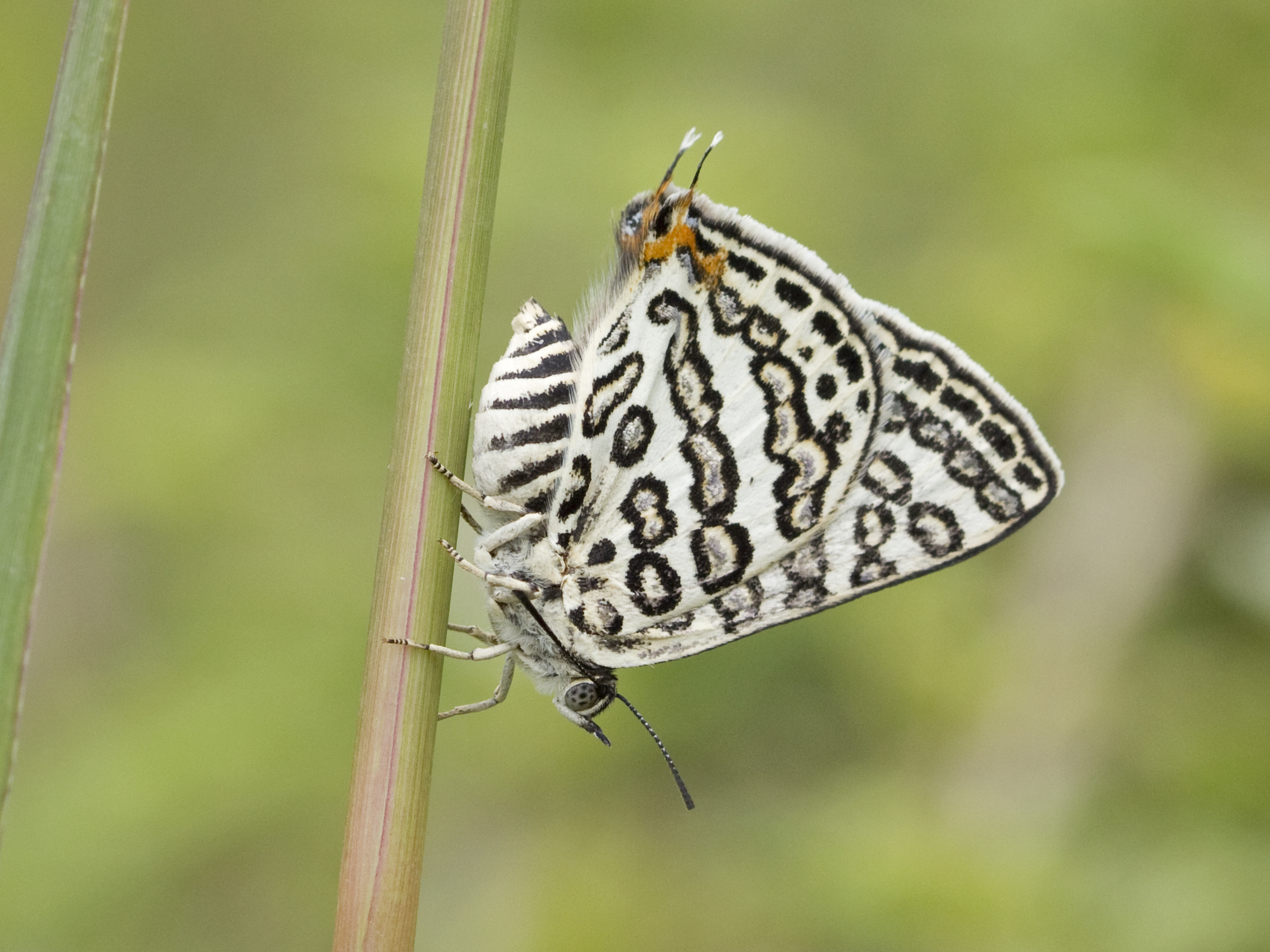
Lilac silverline, Cigaritis lilacinus

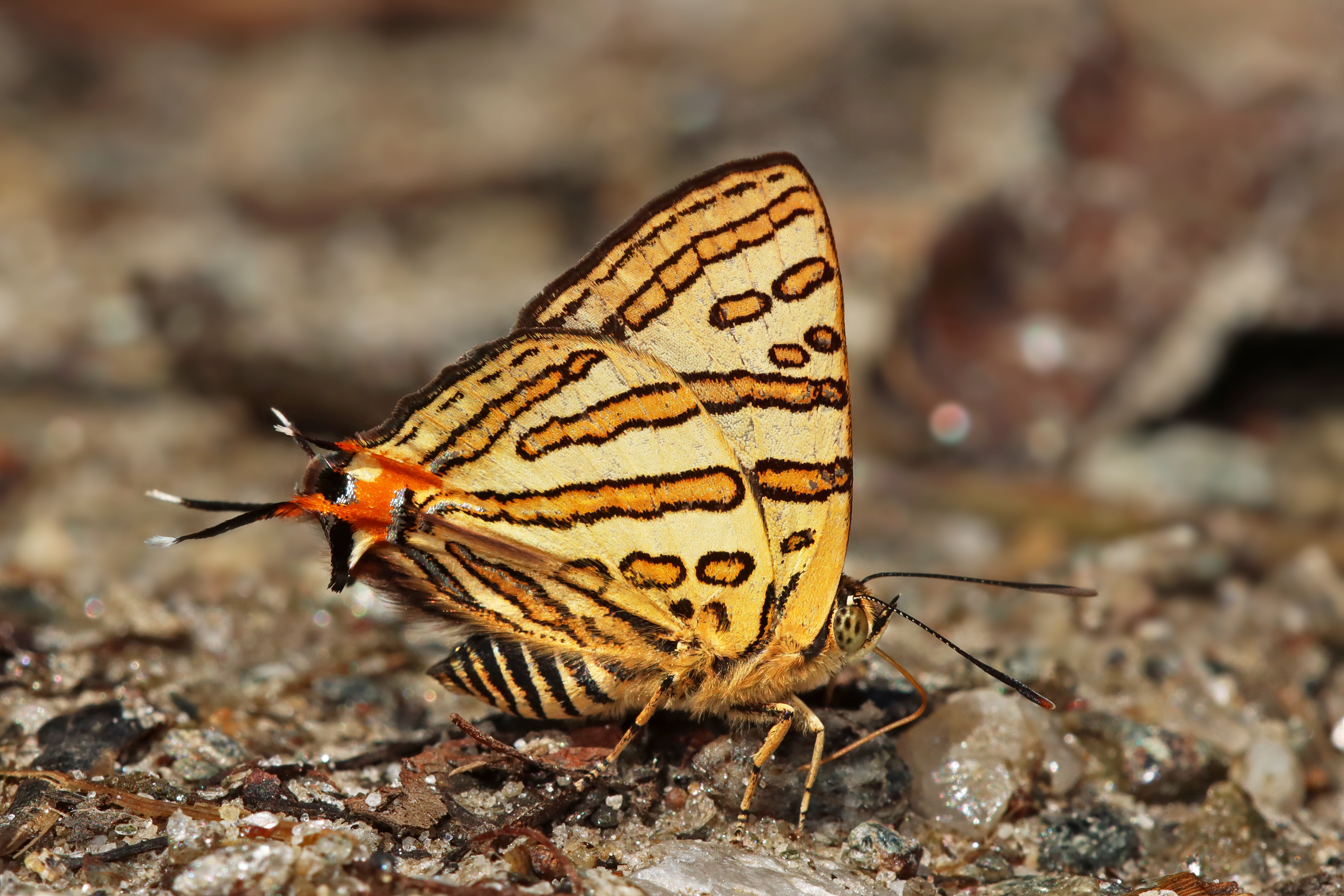
Silver-red silverline, Cigaritis rukma

=== Aphnaeinae ===
| Common name | Binomial name | Subspecies (in India) | Comments |
|---|---|---|---|
| Abnormal silverline | Cigaritis abnormis | | Endemic |
| Tawny silverline | Cigaritis acamas | 1 | |
| Chitral silverline | Cigaritis chitralensis | | |
| Scarce shot silverline | Cigaritis elima | 2 | Schedule 2 |
| Elwes' silverline | Cigaritis elwesi | | Schedule 2 |
| Cinnamon silverline | Cigaritis evansii | 1 | |
| Common shot silverline | Cigaritis ictis | 1 | |
| Lilac silverline | Cigaritis lilacinus | | Schedule 2 |
| Long-banded silverline | Cigaritis lohita | 3 | Schedule 2 |
| Cloud silverline | Cigaritis meghamalaiensis | | Endemic |
| Mishmi silverline | Cigaritis mishmisensis | | |
| SIlver-grey silverline | Cigaritis nipalicus | | Schedule 2 |
| Silver-red silverline | Cigaritis rukma | | |
| Khaki silverline | Cigaritis rukmini | | Schedule 2 |
| Plumbeous silverline | Cigaritis schistacea | 1 | |
| Club silverline | Cigaritis syama | 1 | |
| Common silverline | Cigaritis vulcanus | 1 | |
| Contiguous silverline | Cigaritis zhengweilie | 1 | |

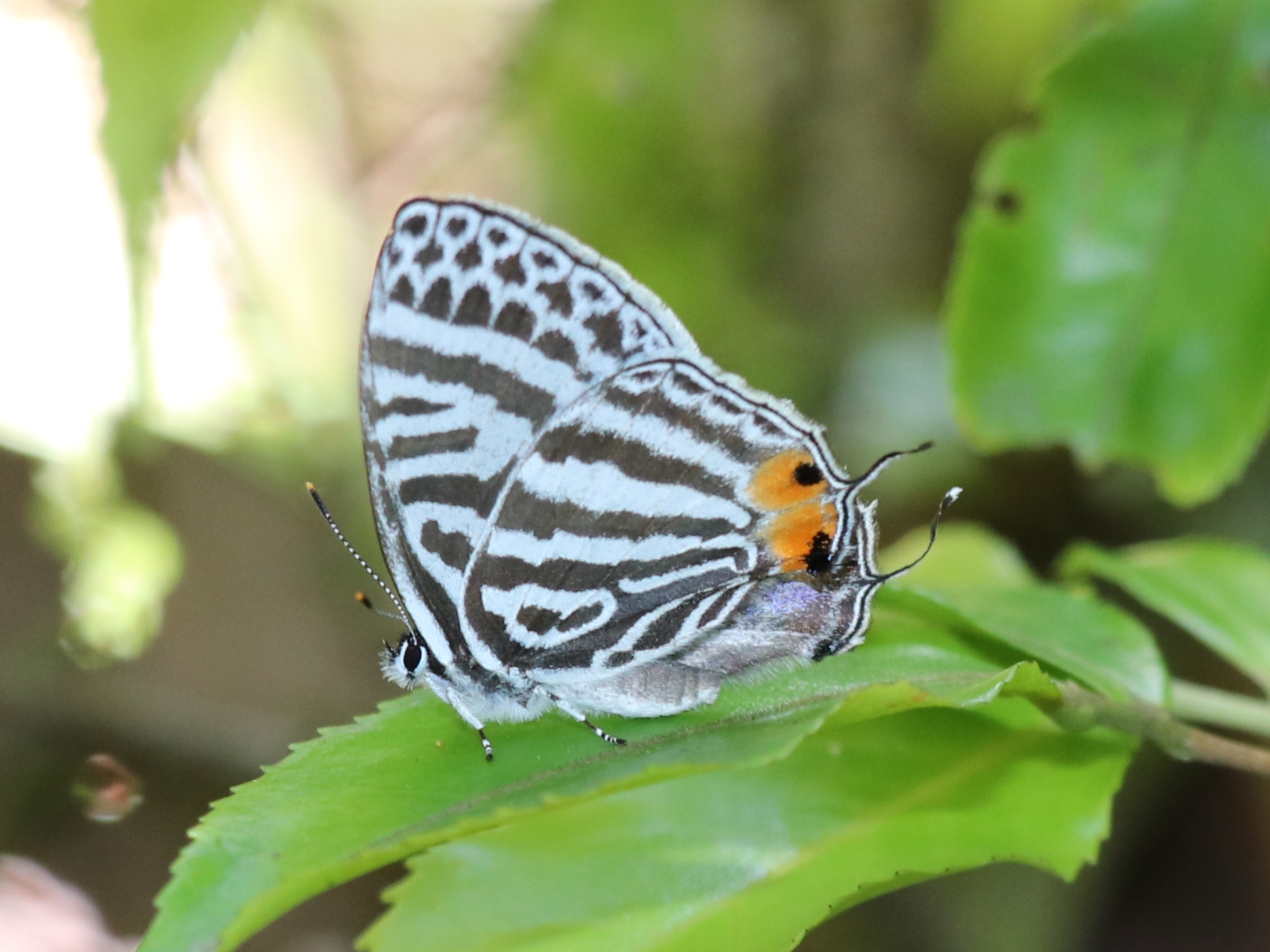
Translucent hairstreak, Yamamotozephyrus kwangtungensis

=== Theclinae ===
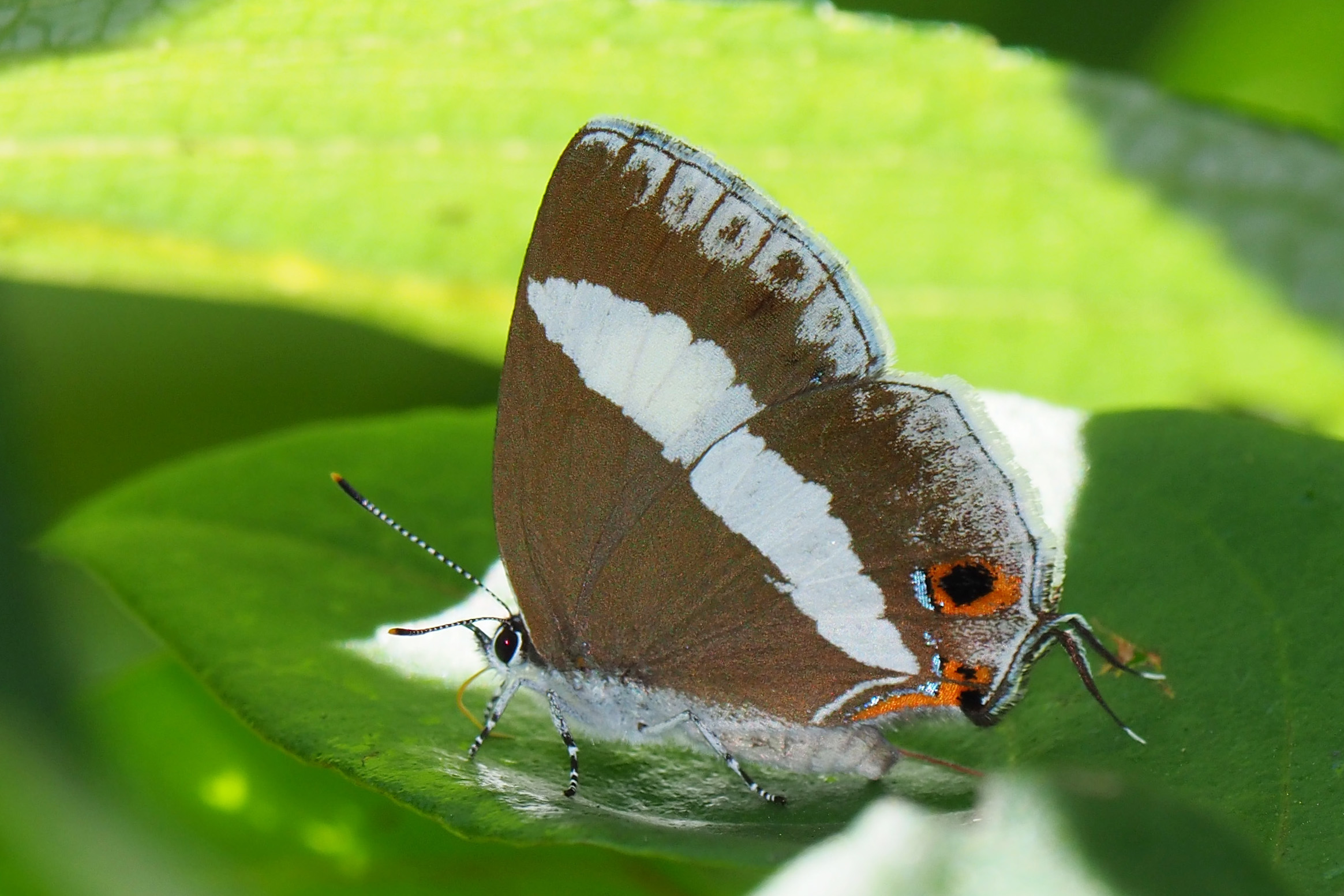
Water hairstreak, Euaspa milionia

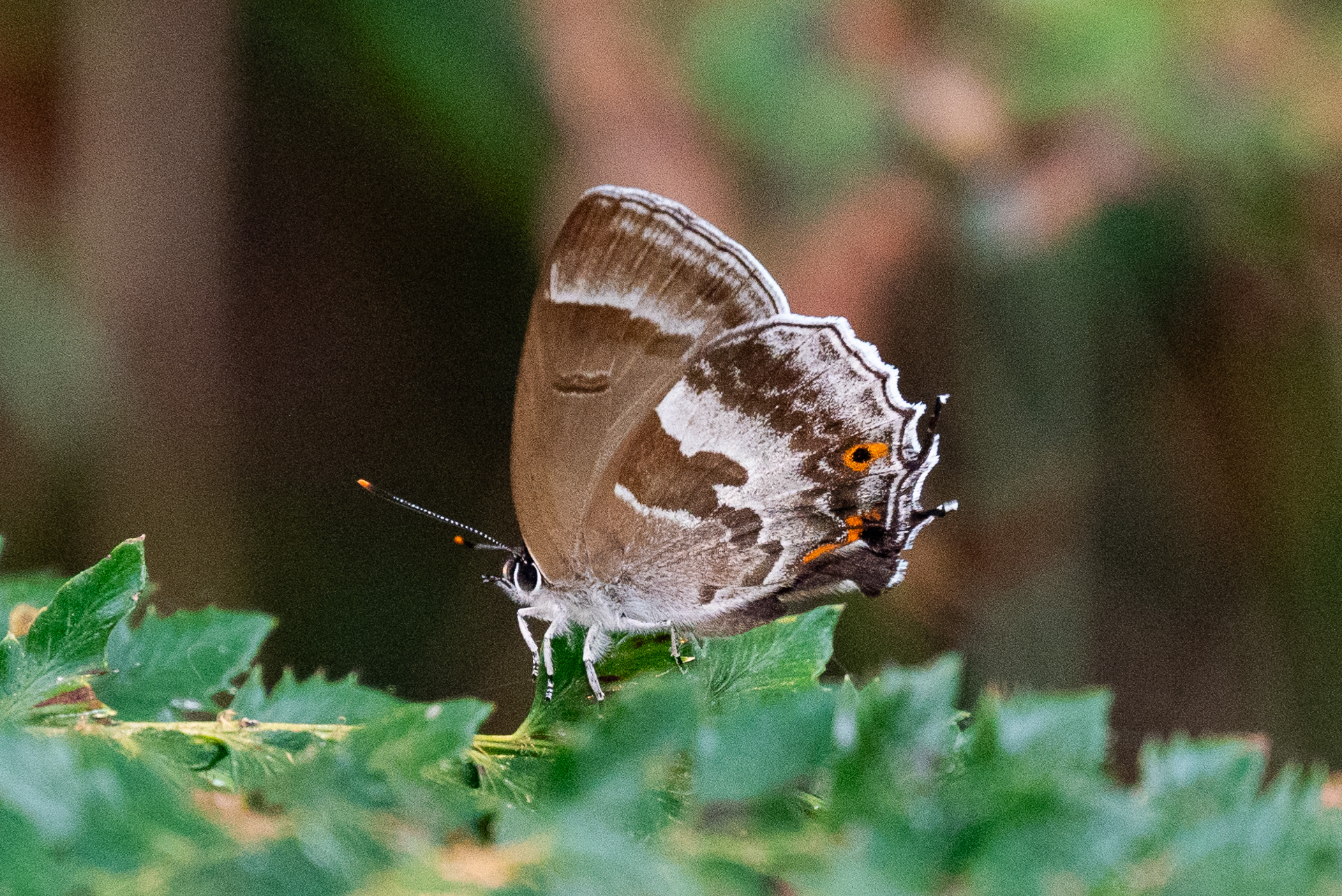
Wonderful hairstreak, Thermozephyrus ataxus

==== Theclini ====
| Common name | Binomial name | Subspecies (in India) | Comments |
|---|---|---|---|
| Nepal walnut blue | Chaetoprocta kurumi | 1 | |
| Walnut blue | Chaetoprocta odata | 2 | |
| Orange-disc hairstreak | Euaspa hishikawai | 1 | |
| Water hairstreak | Euaspa milionia | 1 | |
| Darjeeling hairstreak | Euaspa miyashitai | | |
| Arunachal hairstreak | Euaspa mikamii | | |
| Kachin hairstreak | Euaspa motokii | | |
| Peacock hairstreak | Euaspa pavo | | Schedule 1 |
| White-spotted hairstreak | Shizuyaozephyrus ziha | | Schedule 2 |
| Suroifui hairstreak | Fujiokaozephyrus tsangkie | 1 | |
| Indian purple hairstreak | Iwaseozephyrus mandara | 3 | |
| Dull green hairstreak | Esakiozephyrus icana | 1 | Schedule 2 |
| Translucent hairstreak | Yamamotozephyrus kwangtungensis | 1 | |
| Howarth's green hairstreak | Chrysozephyrus disparatus | 2 | |
| Metallic green hairstreak | Chrysozephyrus duma | | |
| Broad-bordered green hairstreak | Chrysozephyrus dumoides | | |
| Intermediate green hairstreak | Chrysozephyrus intermedius | 1 | |
| Kabru green hairstreak | Chrysozephyrus kabrua | 1 | Schedule 2 |
| Sanders' green hairstreak | Chrysozephyrus sandersi | | |
| Sikkim green hairstreak | Chrysozephyrus sikkimensis | | |
| Manipur green hairstreak | Chrysozephyrus tytleri | 1 | |
| Naga green hairstreak | Chrysozephyrus vittatus | 1 | Schedule 2 |
| Powdered green hairstreak | Chrysozephyrus zoa | 1 | Schedule 2 |
| Cerulean hairstreak | Neozephyrus suroia | 1 | Schedule 2 |
| Bhutan hairstreak | Shirozuozephyrus bhutanensis | | |
| Fawn hairstreak | Shirozuozephyrus birupa | | |
| Jakama hairstreak | Shirozuozephyrus jakamensis | | Schedule 2 |
| Tailless metallic green hairstreak | Shirozuozephyrus khasia | | Schedule 2 |
| Kirbari hairstreak | Shirozuozephyrus kirbariensis | 1 | Schedule 2 |
| Paona hairstreak | Shirozuozephyrus paona | 1 | Schedule 1 |
| Kumaon hairstreak | Shirozuozephyrus triloka | | |
| Assam hairstreak | Inomataozephyrus assamicus | | |
| Silver hairstreak | Inomataozephyrus syla | | Schedule 2 |
| Wonderful hairstreak | Thermozephyrus ataxus | 2 | Schedule 2 |
| Pale hairstreak | Leucantigius atayalicus | 1 | |

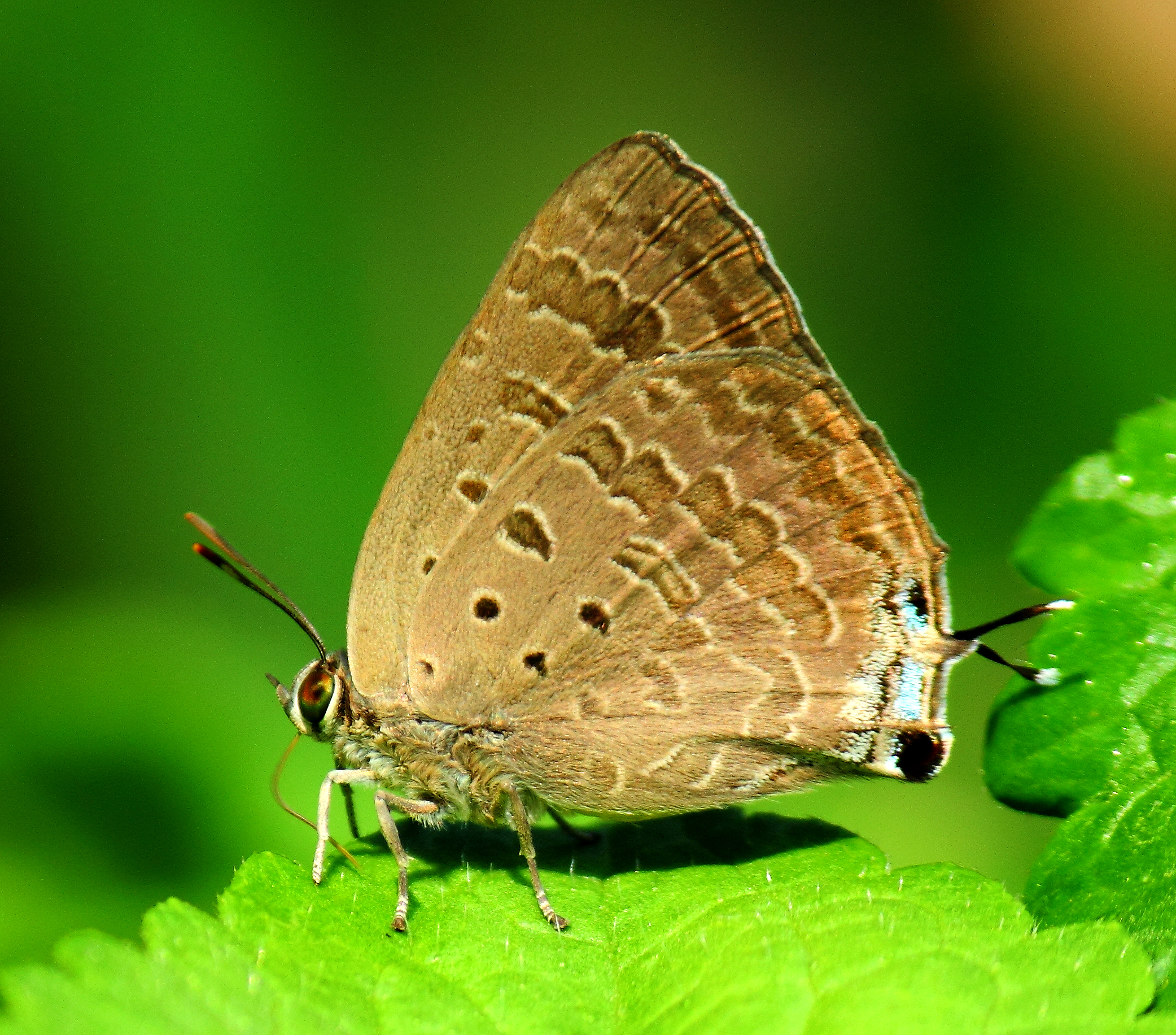
Indian oakblue, Arhopala atrax

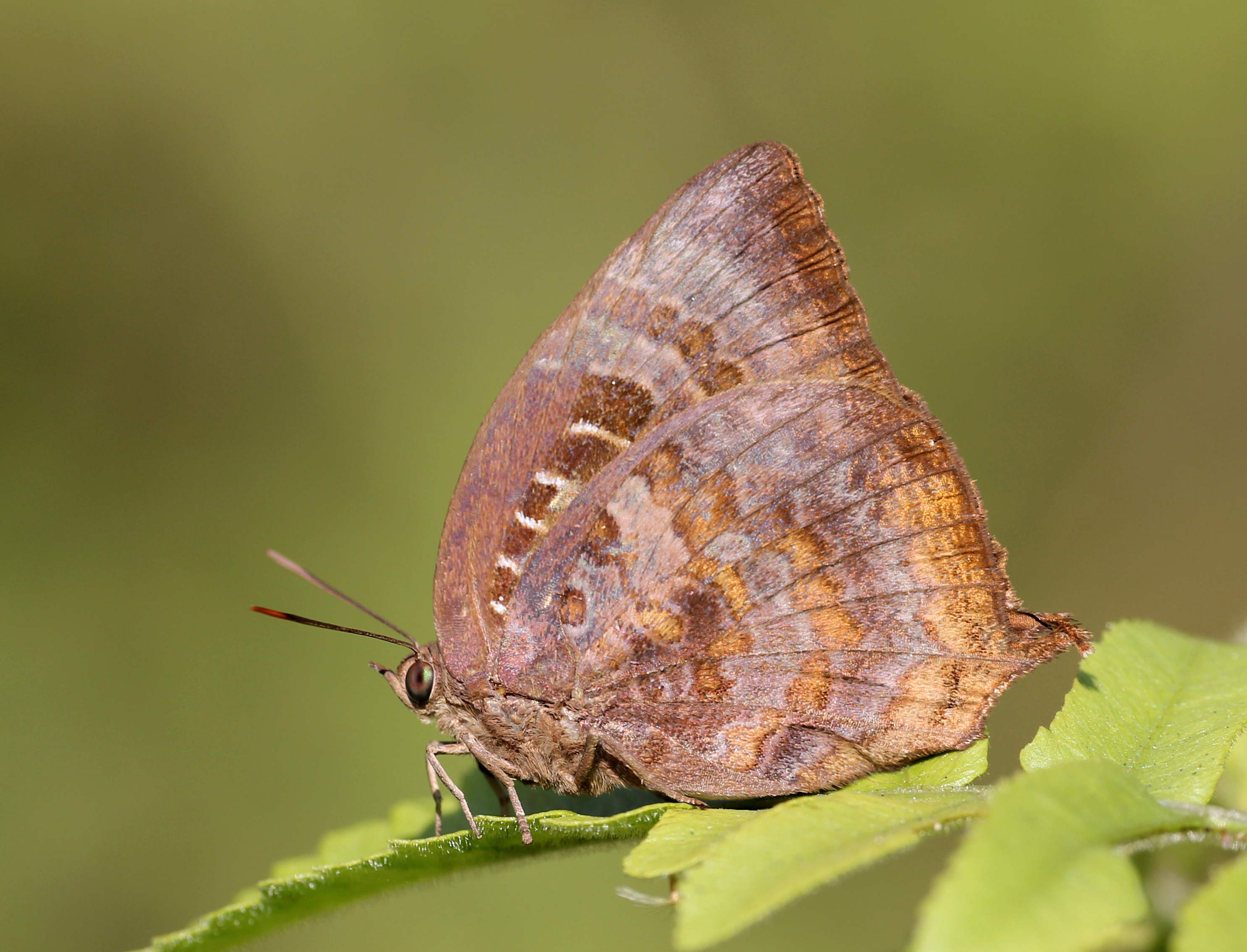
Centaur oakblue, Arhopala centaurus

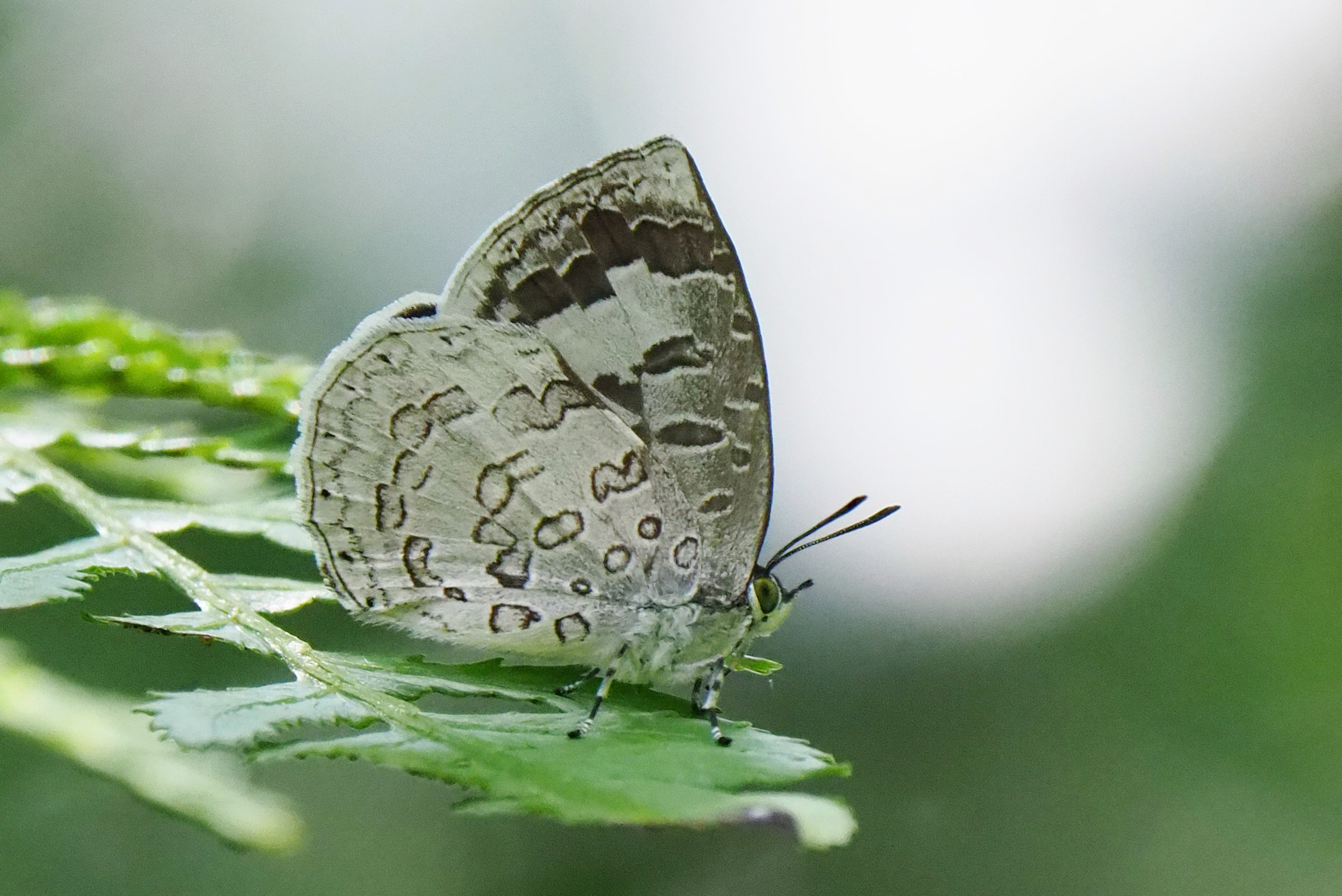
Tailless bushblue, Arhopala ganesa

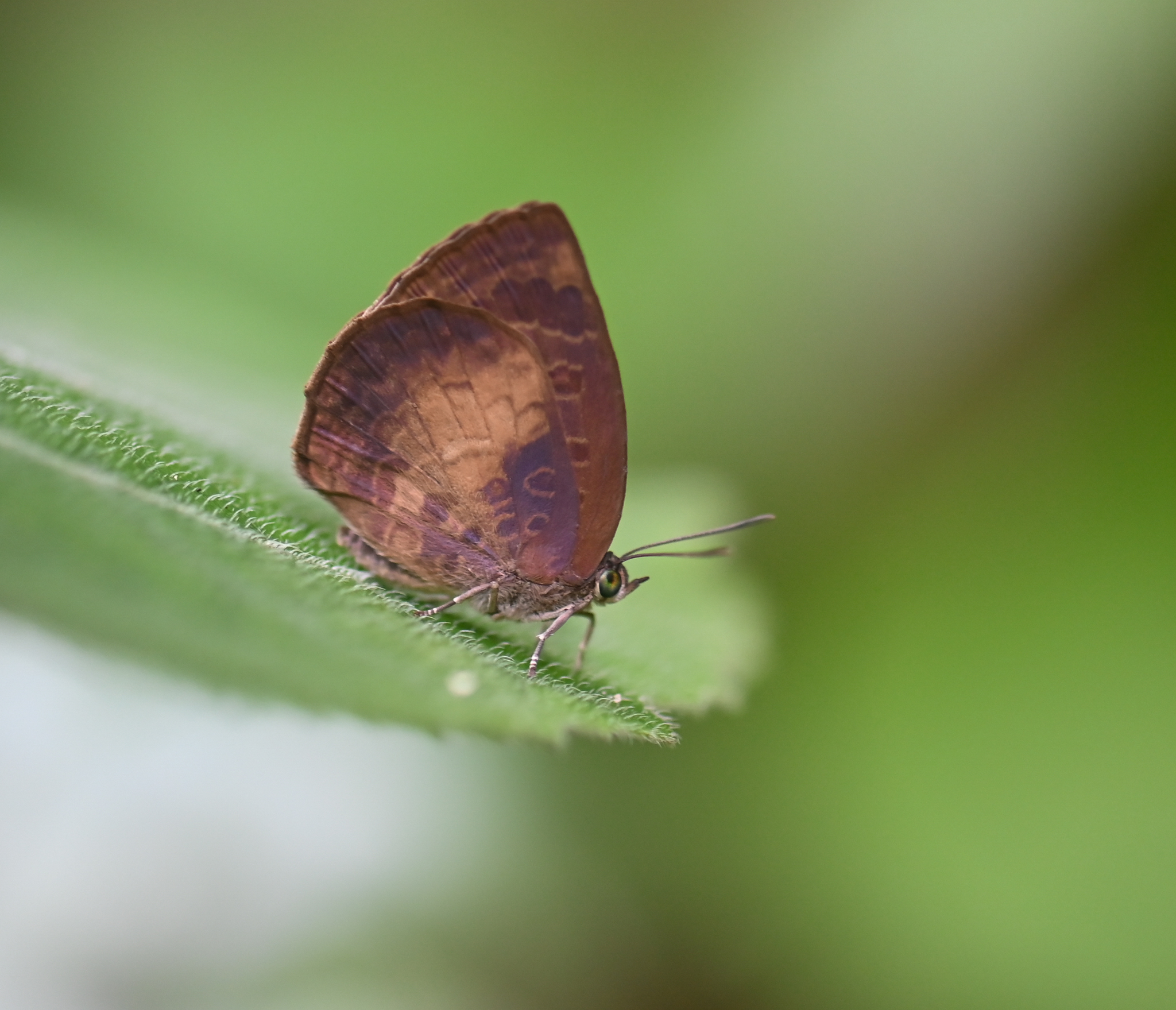
Yellowdisc oakblue, Arhopala perimuta

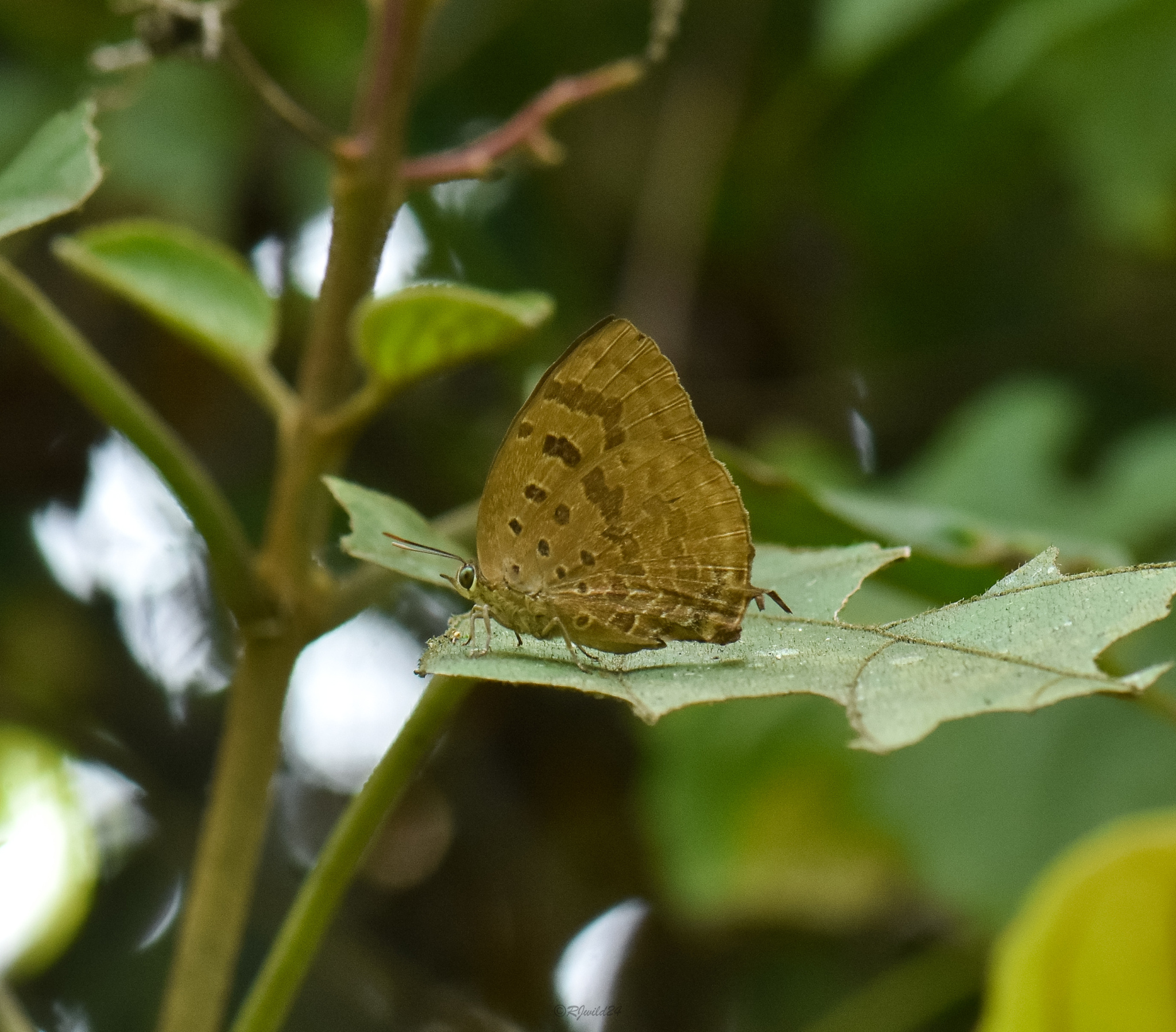
Sylhet oakblue, Arhopala silhetensis

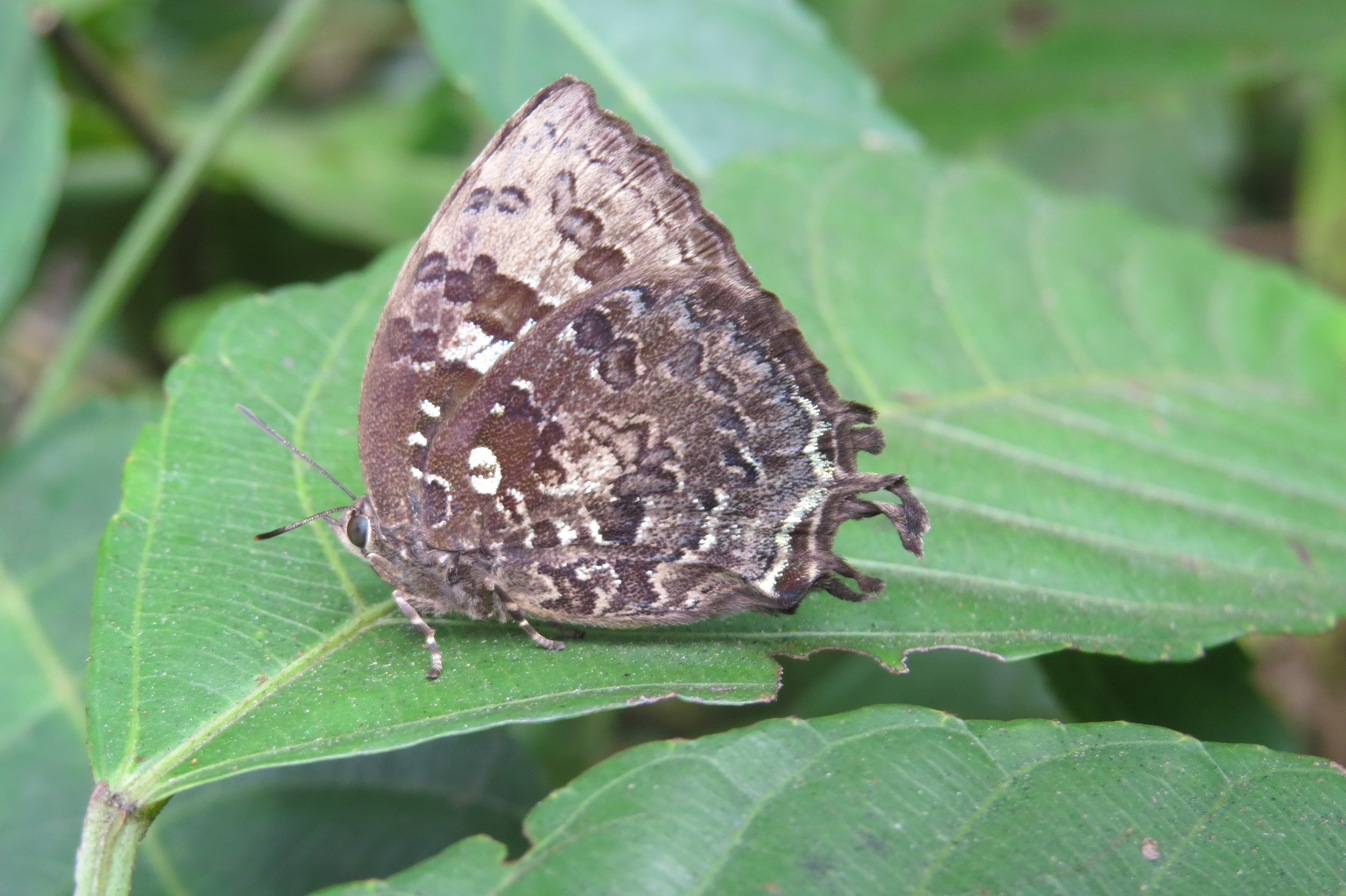
Many-tailed oakblue, Thaduka multicaudata

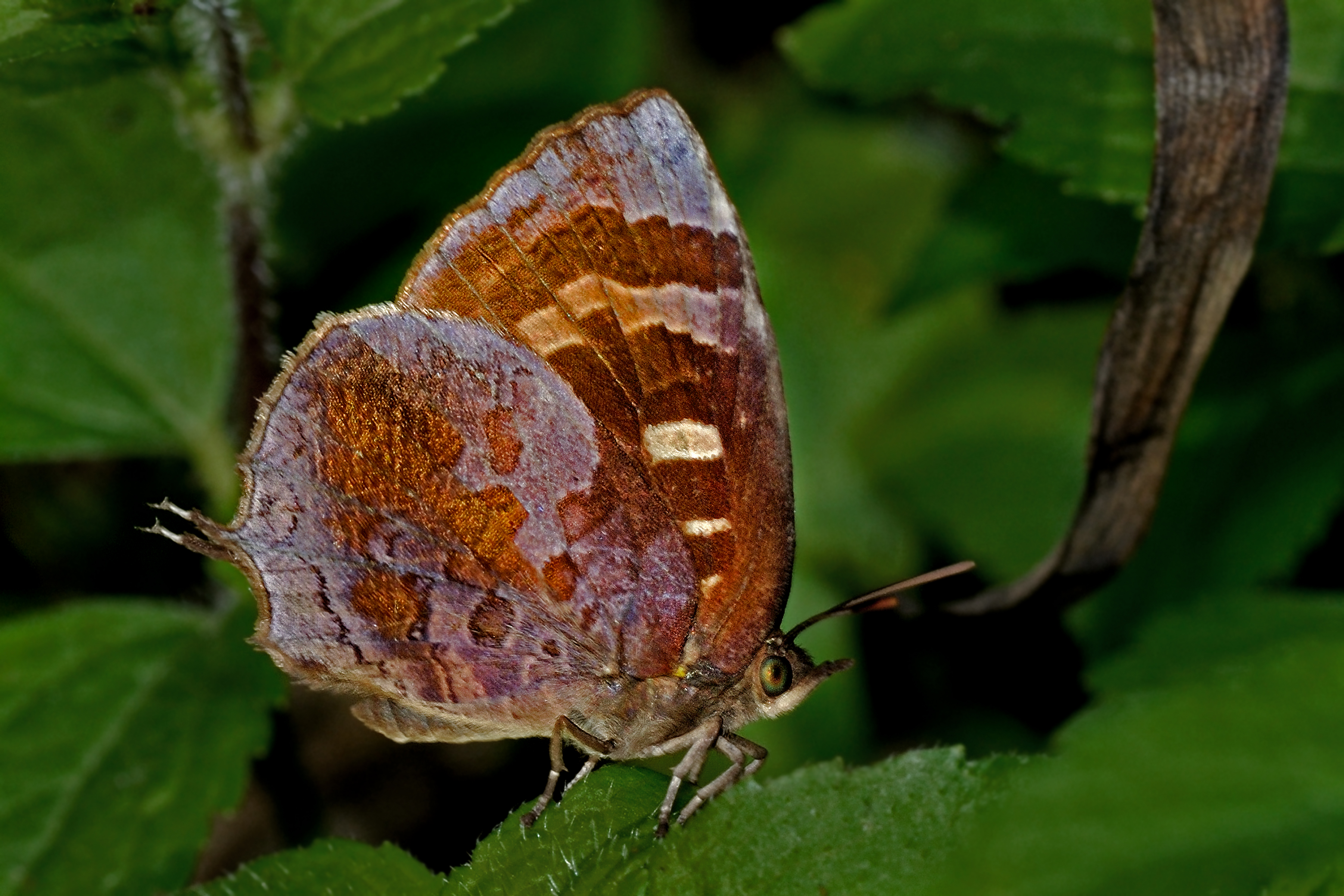
Variegated plushblue, Flos adriana

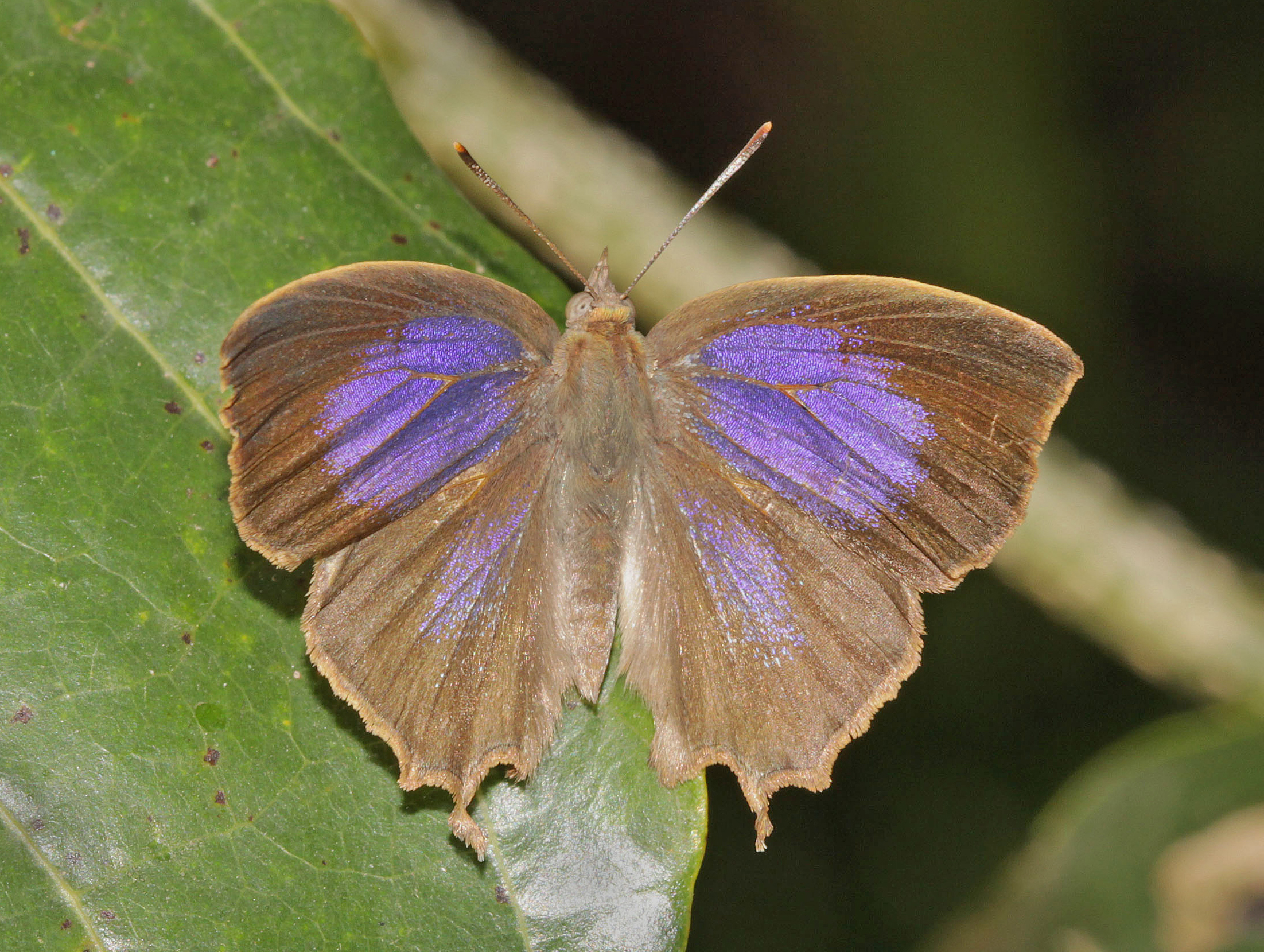
Common acacia blue, Surendra quercetorum

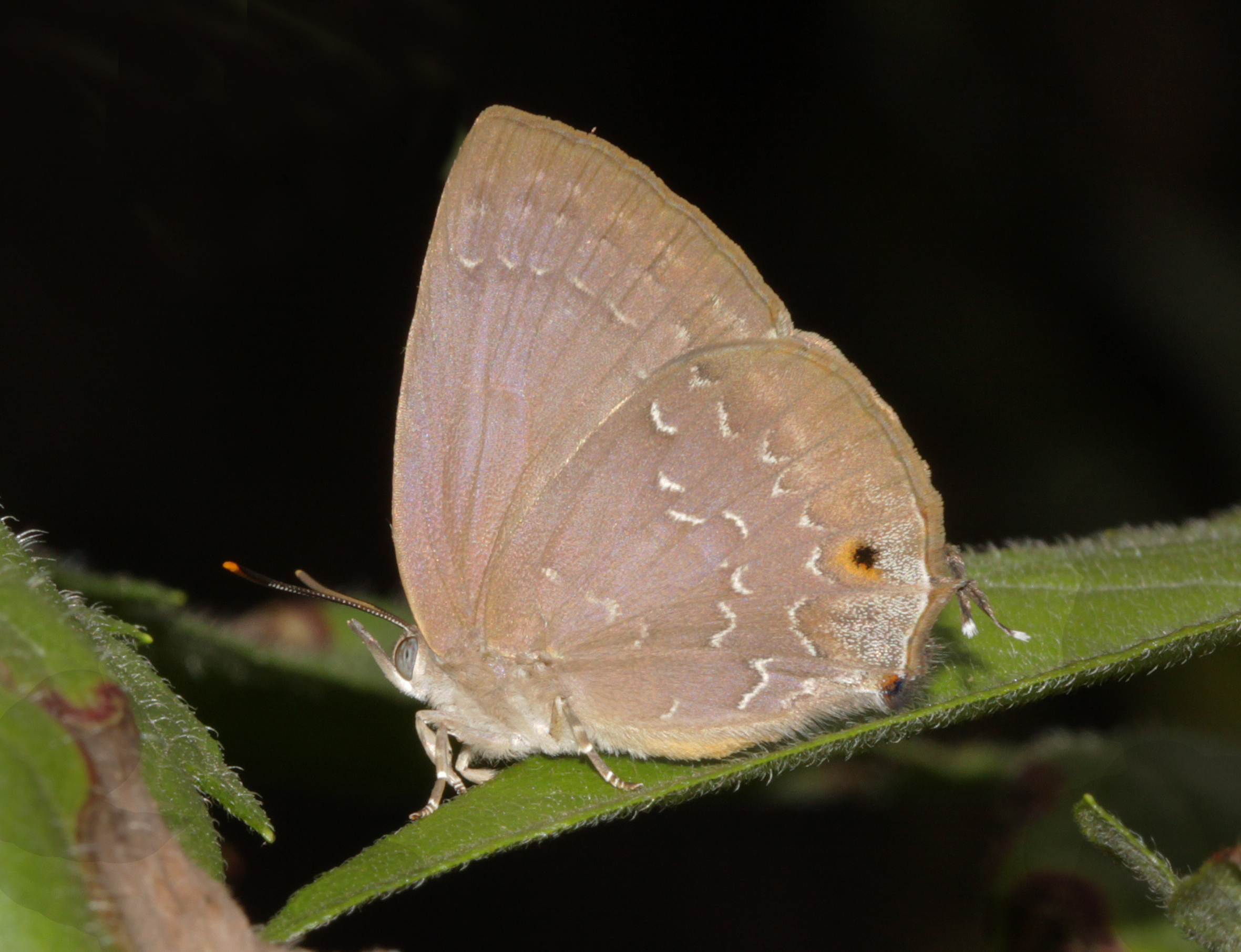
Silver-streaked acacia blue, Zinaspa todara

==== Arhopalini ====
| Common name | Binomial name | Subspecies (in India) | Comments |
|---|---|---|---|
| Chinese hairstreak | Amblopala avidiena | 1 | Schedule 1 |
| Pale bushblue | Arhopala aberrans | | Schedule 2 |
| Tytler's dull oakblue | Arhopala ace | 1 | Schedule 1 |
| Dawnas tailless oakblue | Arhopala aaeta | | |
| De Nicéville's dull oakblue | Arhopala agrata | 1 | Schedule 2 |
| Kanara oakblue | Arhopala alea | | Schedule 1, Endemic |
| Tytler's rosy oakblue | Arhopala allata | 1 | Schedule 2 |
| Silky oakblue | Arhopala alax | | |
| Pallid oakblue | Arhopala alesia | 2 | Schedule 2 |
| Large oakblue | Arhopala amantes | 3 | |
| Dark bushblue | Arhopala ammonides | 1 | |
| Magnificent oakblue | Arhopala anarte | | |
| Multi-spotted oakblue | Arhopala anthelus | 1 | |
| Chocolate bushblue | Arhopala ariel | | Schedule 1 |
| Purple-brown tailless oakblue | Arhopala arvina | 1 | Schedule 1 |
| Broad-banded oakblue | Arhopala asinarus | 1 | |
| Plain tailless oakblue | Arhopala asopia | | Schedule 1 |
| Vinous oakblue | Arhopala athada | 1 | |
| Indian oakblue | Arhopala atrax | | |
| Grey-washed oakblue | Arhopala aurelia | | |
| Tamil oakblue | Arhopala bazaloides | 1 | Schedule 2 |
| Powdered oakblue | Arhopala bazalus | 1 | |
| Doherty's oakblue | Arhopala belphoebe | 1 | |
| Burmese bushblue | Arhopala birmana | 1 | |
| Lilac oakblue | Arhopala camdeo | 1 | Schedule 2 |
| Centaur oakblue | Arhopala centaurus | 3 | |
| Comic oakblue | Arhopala comica | 1 | Schedule 1 |
| Bhutan oakblue | Arhopala curiosa | | |
| White-spotted oakblue | Arhopala democritus | 1 | Subspecies not named |
| Frosted oakblue | Arhopala dispar | 1 | |
| Pale Himalayan oakblue | Arhopala dodonaea | | |
| Green oakblue | Arhopala eumolphus | 1 | |
| Spotless oakblue | Arhopala fulla | 2 | Schedule 2 |
| Tailless bushblue | Arhopala ganesa | 2 | Schedule 2 |
| Pointed green oakblue | Arhopala hellenore | 1 | |
| Doherty's dull oakblue | Arhopala khamti | | |
| Large-spotted oakblue | Arhopala nicevillei | | |
| Hewitson's dull oakblue | Arhopala oenea | | Schedule 2 |
| Opal oakblue | Arhopala opalina | 1 | Schedule 1 |
| Dusky bushblue | Arhopala paraganesa | 2 | Schedule 2 |
| Glazed oakblue | Arhopala paralea | | Schedule 2 |
| Hooked oakblue | Arhopala paramuta | 1 | |
| Yellowdisc tailless oakblue | Arhopala perimuta | 1 | |
| Dark Himalayan oakblue | Arhopala rama | 2 | |
| Rosy oakblue | Arhopala selta | 1 | |
| Sylhet oakblue | Arhopala silhetensis | 1 | Schedule 2 |
| Yellowdisc oakblue | Arhopala singla | | |
| Andaman tailless oakblue | Arhopala zeta | | Schedule 1, Endemic |
| Many-tailed oakblue | Thaduka multicaudata | 1 | Schedule 2 |
| Crenulate oakblue | Apporasa atkinsoni | | |
| Falcate oakblue | Mahathala ameria | 2 | Schedule 2 |
| Aberrant bushblue | Flos abseus | 1 | |
| Variegated plushblue (Note: This tentatively includes Flos asoka as the relationship between Flos adriana and Flos asoka is unclear. A DNA analysis showed that the two species were identical.) | Flos adriana | | |
| Brilliant plushblue | Flos anniella | 1 | |
| Plain plushblue | Flos apidanus | 1 | Schedule 2 |
| Tailless plushblue | Flos areste | | Schedule 2 |
| Chinese plushblue | Flos chinensis | | |
| Bifid plushblue | Flos diardi | 1 | |
| Shining plushblue | Flos fulgida | 1 | |
| Saffron | Mota massyla | | |
| Common acacia blue | Surendra quercetorum | 3 | |
| Silver-streaked acacia blue | Zinaspa todara | 2 | Schedule 2 |

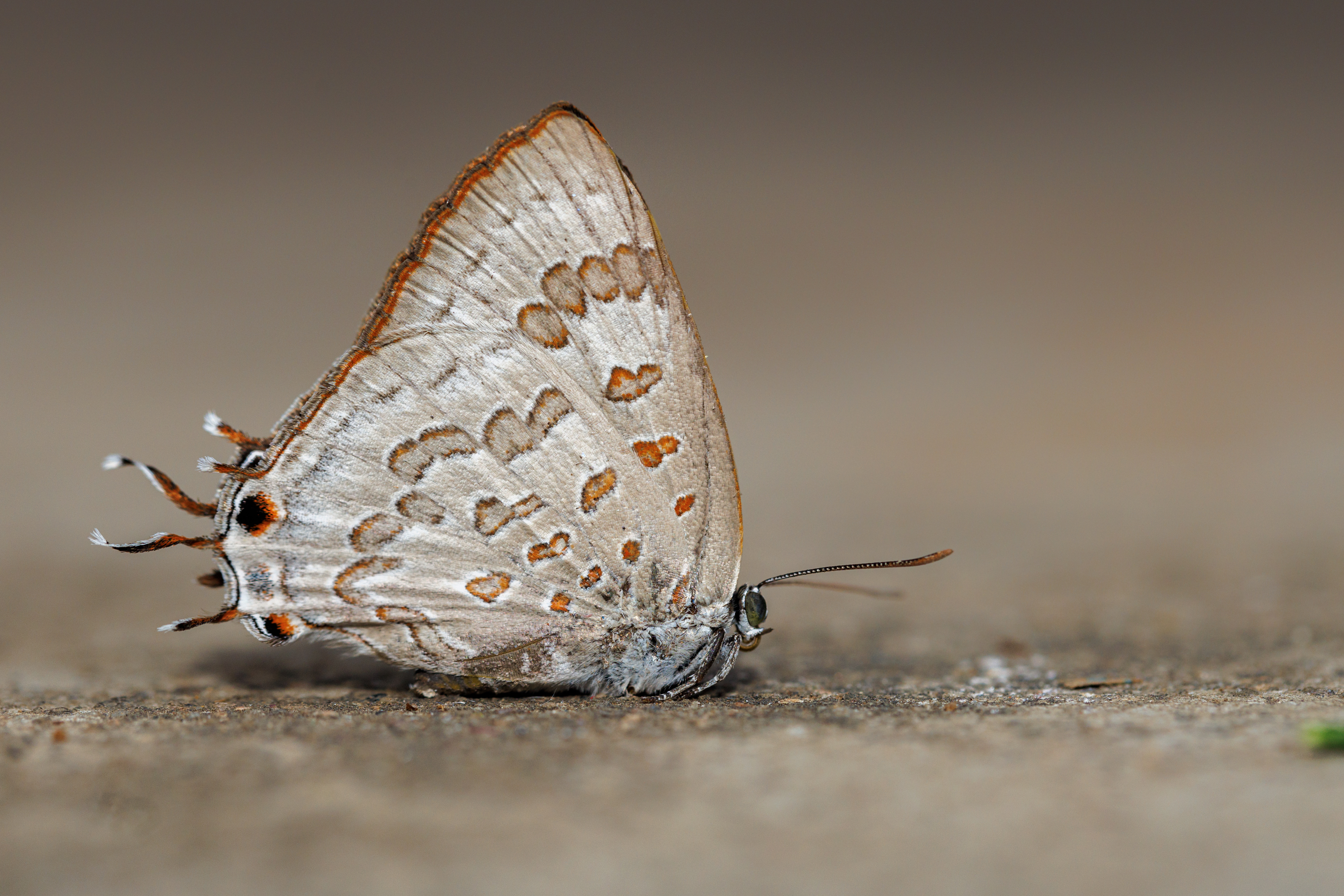
Redspot, Zesius chrysomallus

==== Zesiini ====
| Common name | Binomial name | Subspecies (in India) | Comments |
|---|---|---|---|
| Redspot | Zesius chrysomallus | | |

==== Amblypodiini ====
| Common name | Binomial name | Subspecies (in India) | Comments |
|---|---|---|---|
| Purple leaf blue | Amblypodia anita | 3 | |
| Scarce silverstreak blue | Iraota rochana | 1 | Schedule 2 |
| SIlverstreak blue | Iraota timoleon | 2 | |

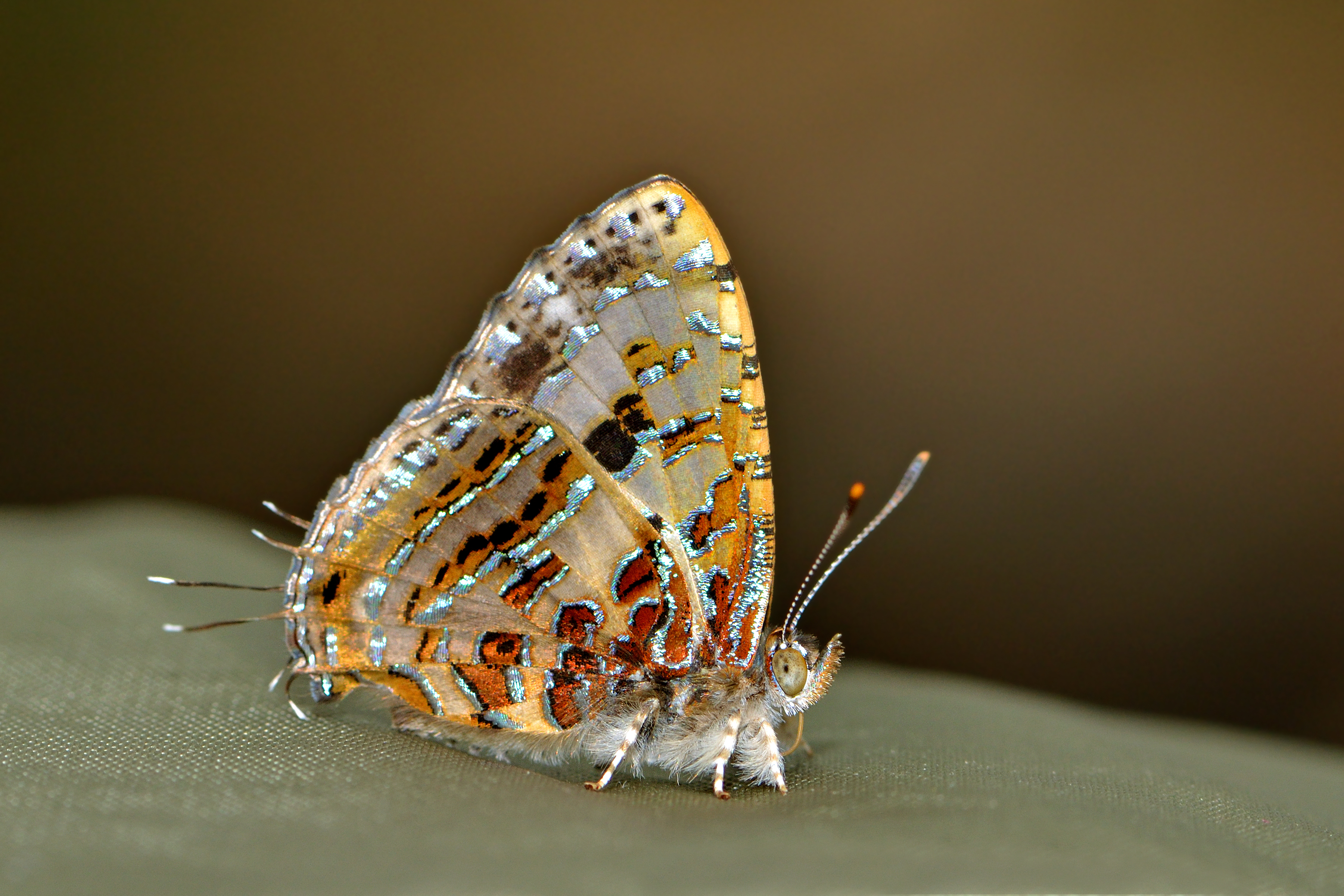
Common tinsel, Catapaecilma major

==== Catapaecilmatini ====
| Common name | Binomial name | Subspecies (in India) | Comments |
|---|---|---|---|
| Common tinsel | Catapaecilma major | 3 | Schedule 2 |
| Yellow tinsel | Catapaecilma subochrea | 1 | |
| Dark tinsel | Acupicta delicatum | | Schedule 2 |

==== Loxurini ====
| Common name | Binomial name | Subspecies (in India) | Comments |
|---|---|---|---|
| Yamfly | Loxura atymnus | 4 | |
| Branded yamfly | Yasoda tripunctata | 1 | Schedule 2 |

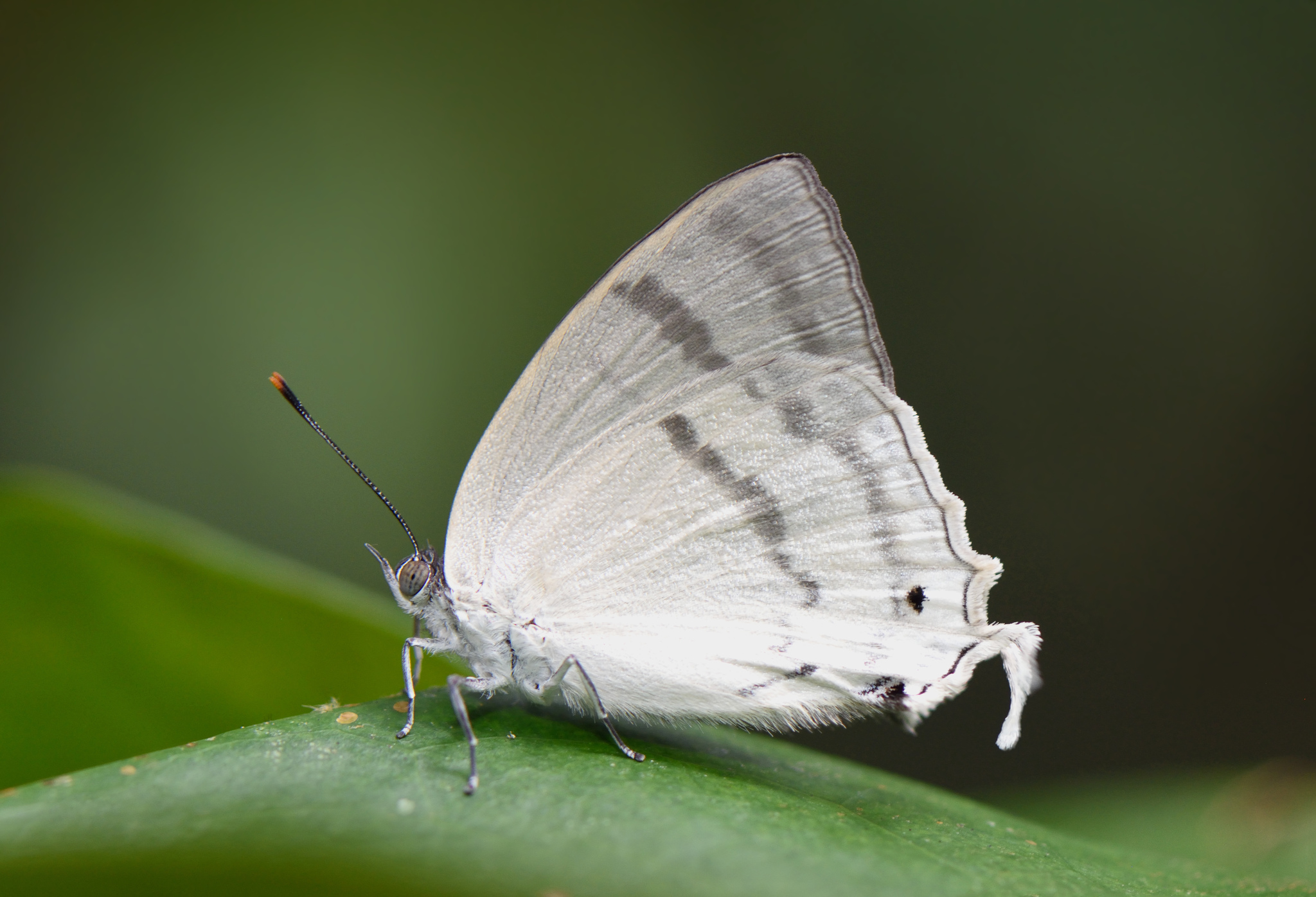
Brown yam, Drina donina

==== Drinini ====
| Common name | Binomial name | Subspecies (in India) | Comments |
|---|---|---|---|
| Brown yam | Drina donina | | |

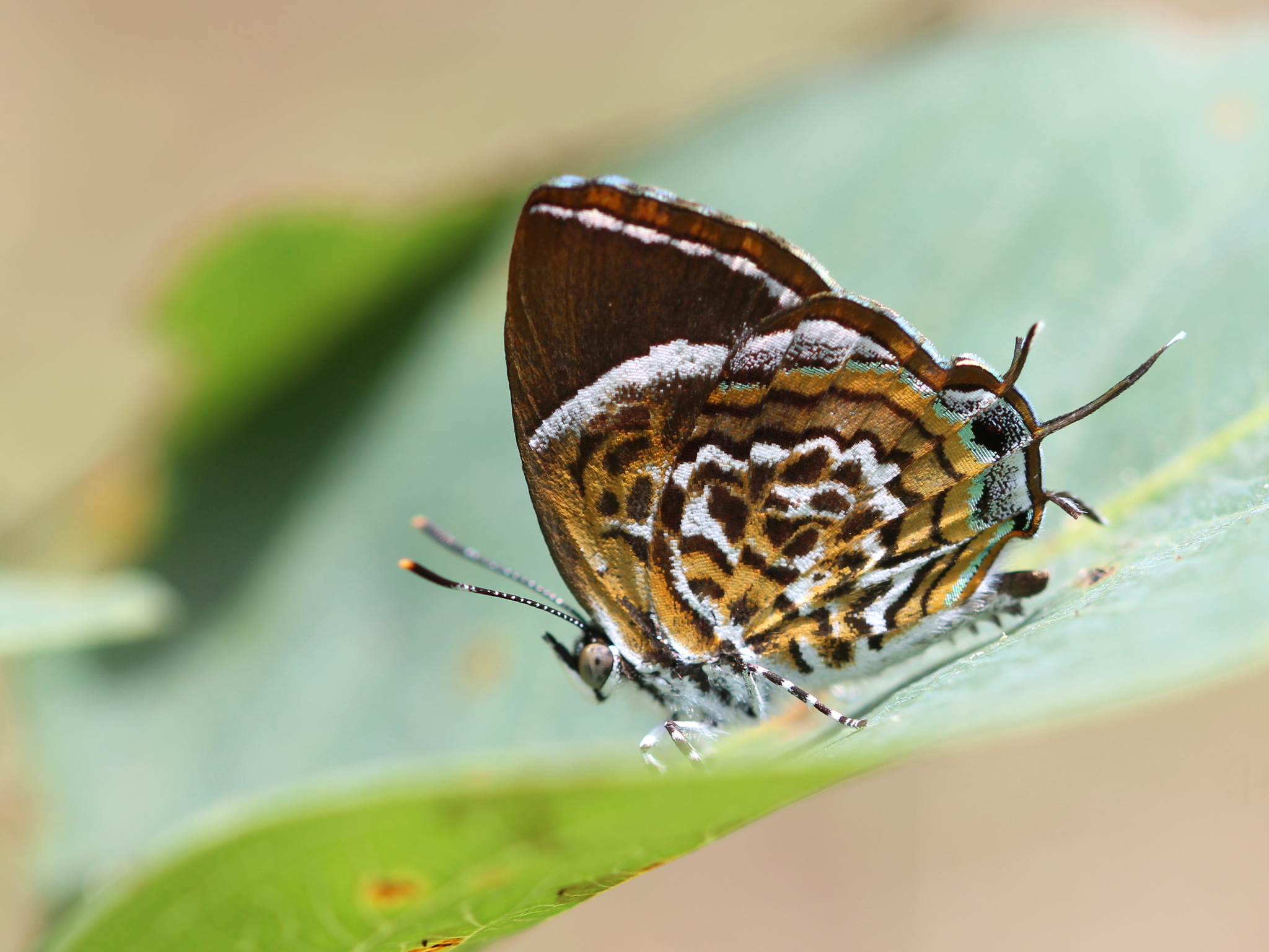
Monkey puzzle, Rathinda amor

==== Cheritrini ====
| Common name | Binomial name | Subspecies (in India) | Comments |
|---|---|---|---|
| Violet onyx | Horaga albimacula | 2 | Schedule 2 |
| Common onyx | Horaga onyx | 3 | Schedule 2 |
| Yellow onyx | Horaga syrinx | 1 | |
| Litin onyx | Horaga takanamii | 1 | Subspecies not named |
| Monkey puzzle | Rathinda amor | | |
| Common imperial | Cheritra freja | 2 | |
| Truncate imperial | Cheritrella truncipennis | | Schedule 2 |
| Blue imperial | Ticherra acte | 1 | |
| Blue posy | Drupadia scaeva | 1 | Schedule 1 |

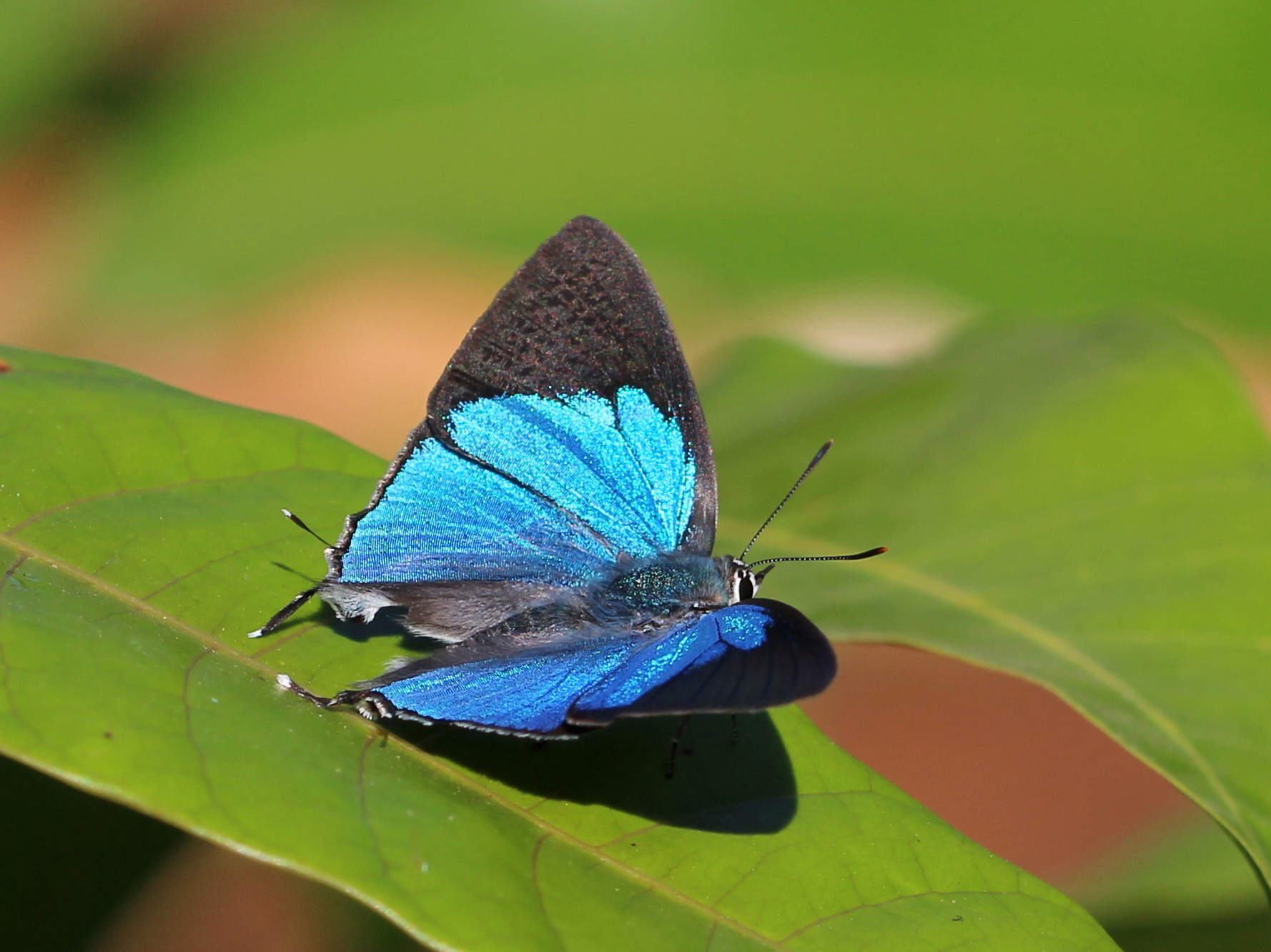
Peacock royal, Tajuria cippus

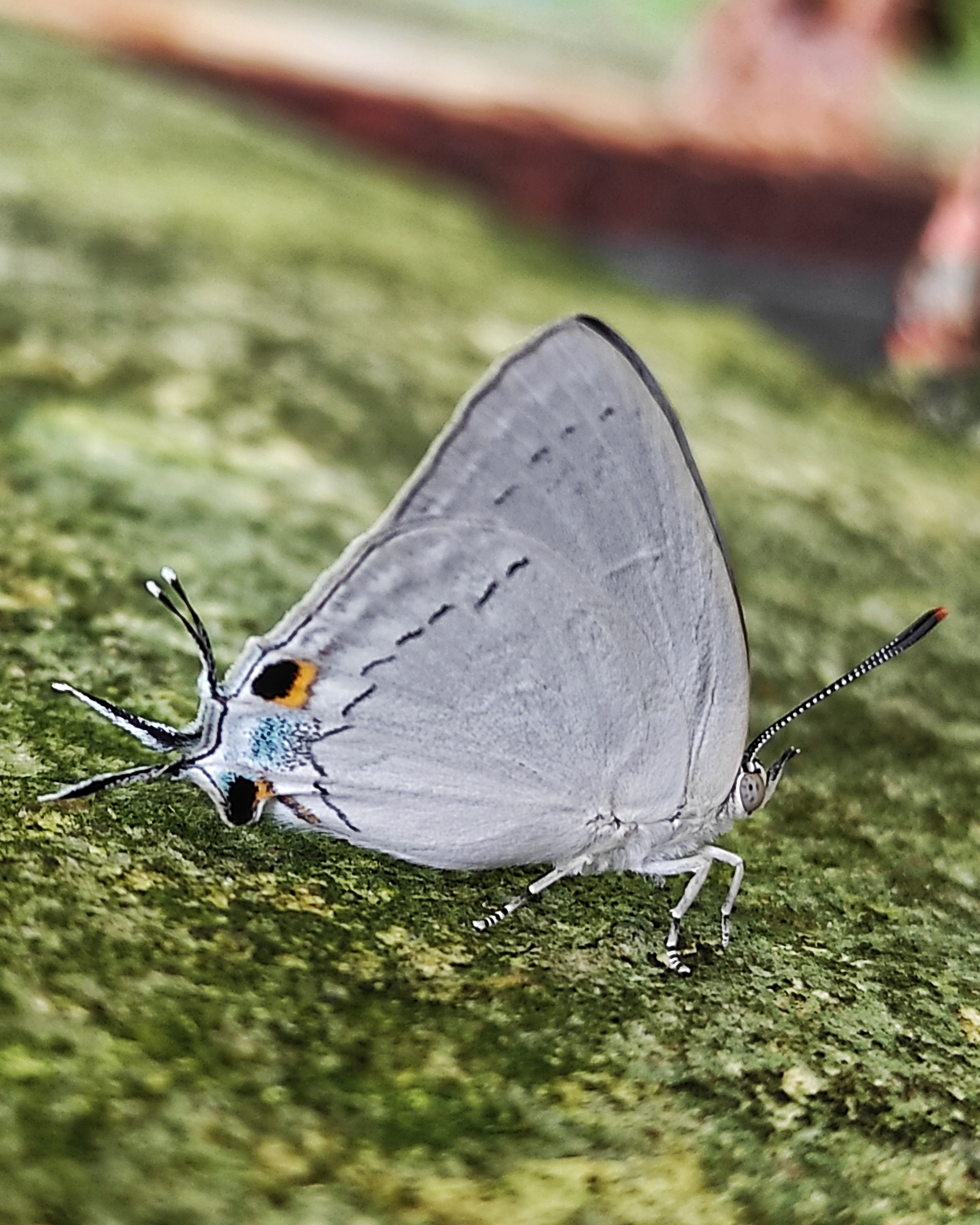
Plains blue royal, Tajuria jehana

==== Iolaini ====
| Common name | Binomial name | Subspecies (in India) | Comments |
|---|---|---|---|
| Slate royal | Pratapa bhotea | 1 | |
| White-tufted royal | Pratapa deva | 2 | Schedule 2 |
| Dark blue royal | Pratapa icetas | 3 | Schedule 2 |
| Blue royal | Pratapa icetoides | 1 | |
| Pallid royal | Tajuria albiplaga | 1 | Schedule 2 |
| Peacock royal | Tajuria cippus | 1 | Schedule 2 |
| Black-branded royal | Tajuria culta | | Schedule 2 |
| Flash royal | Tajuria deudorix | 1 | |
| Straightline royal | Tajuria diaeus | 1 | Schedule 2 |
| Scarce white royal | Tajuria illurgioides | | Schedule 2 |
| White royal | Tajuria illurgis | 1 | Schedule 2 |
| Bornean royal | Tajuria isaeus | 1 | |
| Uncertain royal | Tajuria ister | 1 | Schedule 2 |
| Plains blue royal | Tajuria jehana | 1 | |
| Spotted royal | Tajuria maculata | | |
| Orange-and-black royal | Tajuria megistia | 1 | |
| Branded royal | Tajuria melastigma | | Schedule 2 |
| Cerulean royal | Tajuria nela | 1 | |
| Chestnut-and-black royal | Tajuria yajna | 2 | Schedule 1, Schedule 2 |
| White-banded royal | Dacalana cotys | 1 | |
| Narrow-banded royal | Dacalana vui | | |
| Double-tufted royal | Dacalana penicilligera | | |
| Broadtail royal | Creon cleobis | 1 | |
| Baby royal | Bullis buto | 1 | |
| Banded royal | Rachana jalindra | 3 | Schedule 2 |
| Pale grand imperial | Neocheritra fabronia | 1 | Schedule 2 |
| Cachar mandarin blue | Charana cepheis | | Schedule 1 |
| Mandarin blue | Charana mandarina | 1 | |
| Red imperial | Suasa lisides | 1 | Schedule 2 |
| Azure royal | Britomartis cleoboides | 1 | |

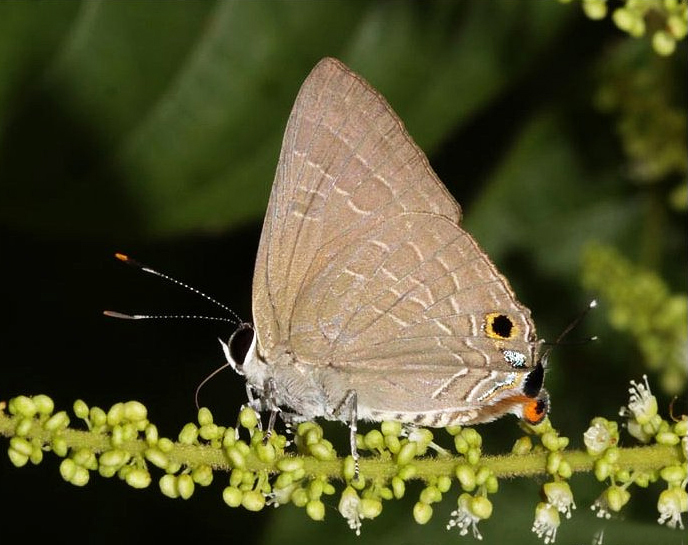
Cornelian, Deudorix epijarbas

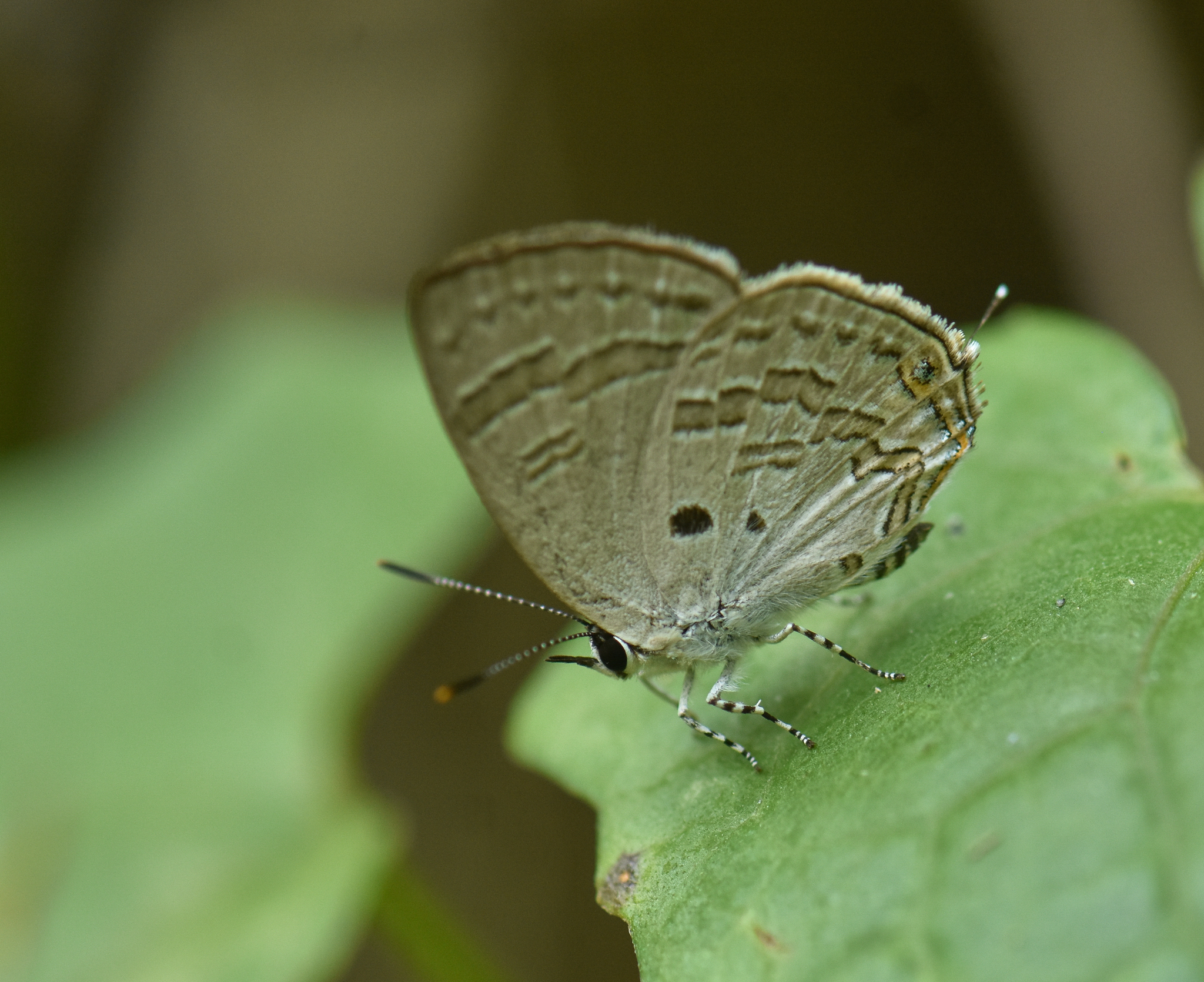
Broad spark, Sinthusa chandrana

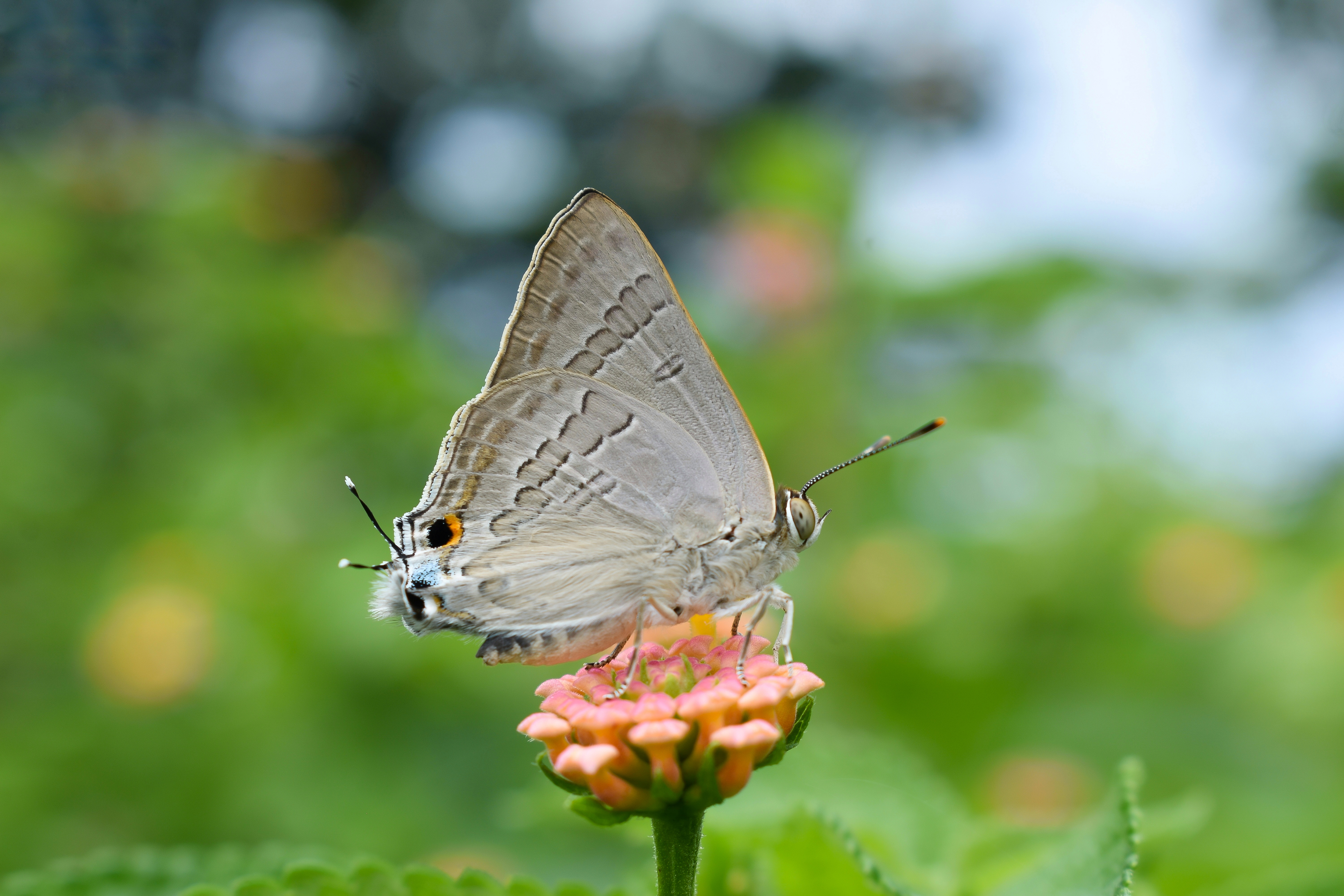
Common guava blue, Virachola isocrates

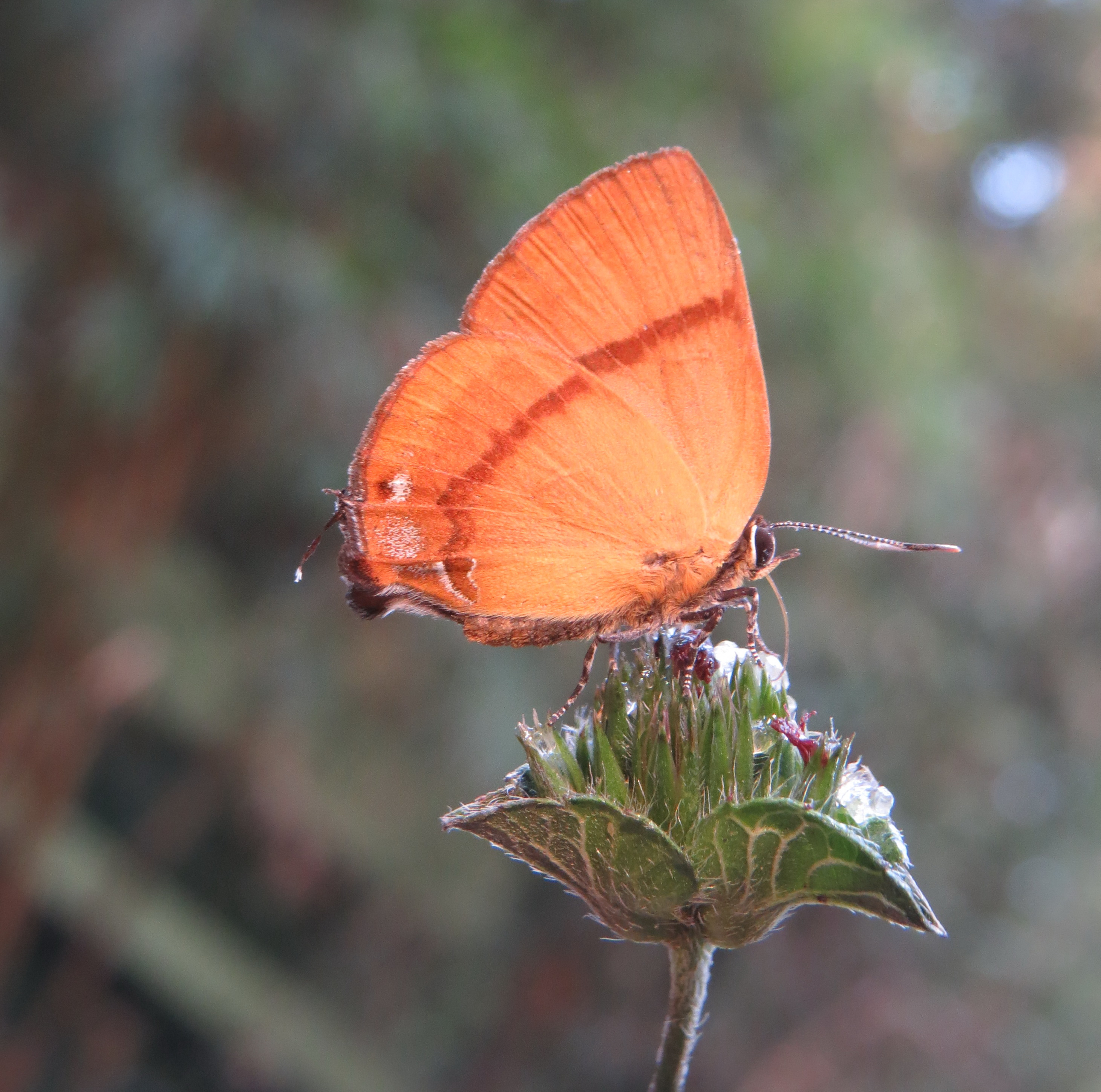
Malabar flash, Rapala lankana

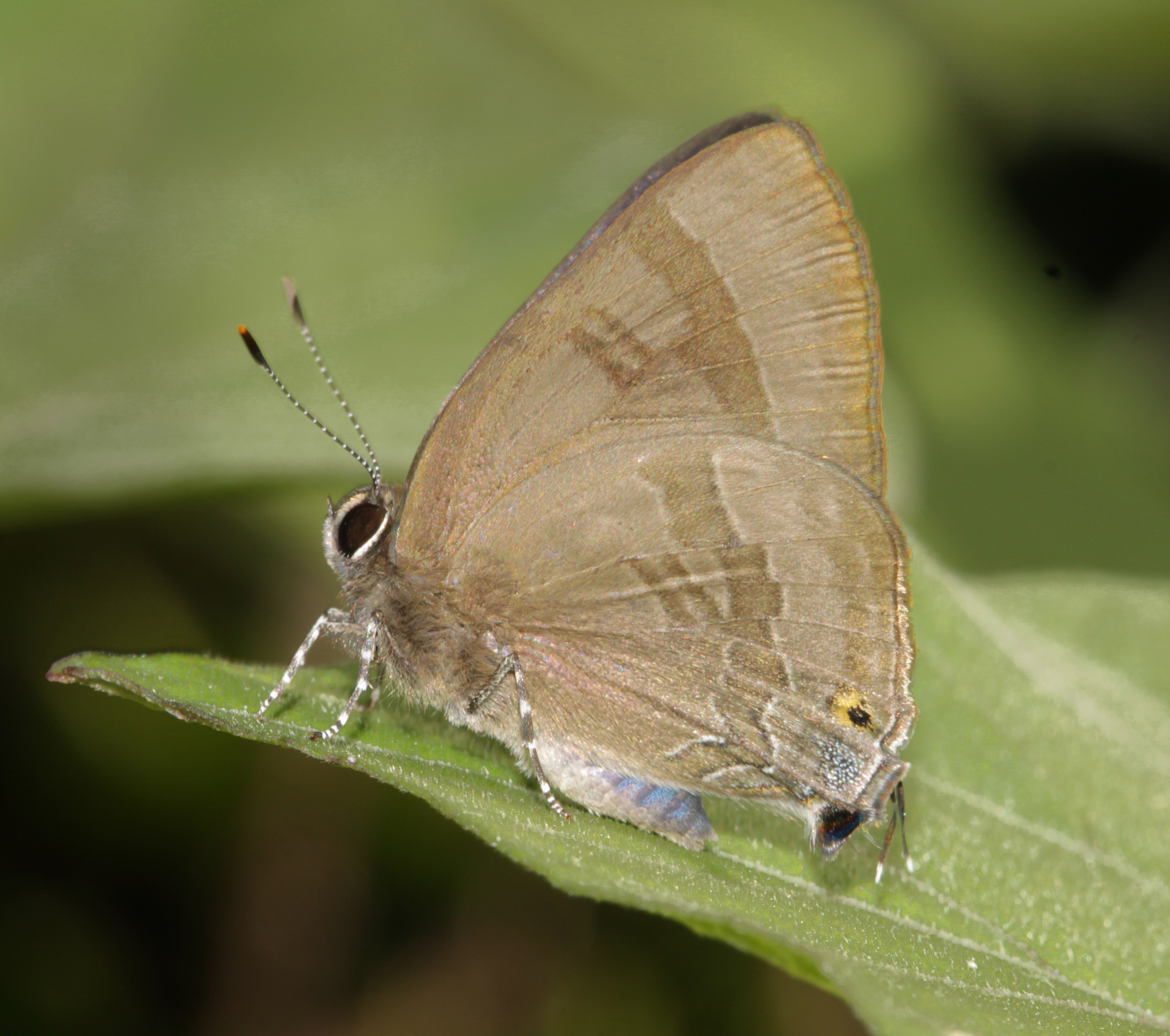
Indigo flash, Rapala varuna

==== Deudorigini ====
| Common name | Binomial name | Subspecies (in India) | Comments |
|---|---|---|---|
| Cornelian | Deudorix epijarbas | 1 | |
| Assam cornelian | Deudorix gaetulia | | |
| Doherty's guava blue | Virachola dohertyi | | |
| Common guava blue | Virachola isocrates | | |
| Whiteline flash | Virachola kessuma | 1 | |
| Large guava blue | Virachola perse | 2 | |
| Refulgent flash | Virachola refulgens | | Schedule 2 |
| Rosy guava blue | Virachola rubida | | |
| Scarce guava blue | Virachola similis | 2 | |
| Green flash | Artipe eryx | 1 | Schedule 2 |
| Broad spark | Sinthusa chandrana | 2 | Schedule 2 |
| Obscure spark | Sinthusa confusa | | |
| Narrow spark | Sinthusa nasaka | 2 | Schedule 2 |
| Yunnan spark | Sinthusa menglaensis | | |
| Pale spark | Sinthusa virgo | | Schedule 2 |
| Witch | Araotes lapithis | 1 | Schedule 2 |
| Plane | Bindahara phocides | 2 | Schedule 2 |
| Blue-bordered plane | Bindahara moorei | | |
| Malay red flash | Rapala damona | | |
| Scarlet flash | Rapala dieneces | 2 | |
| Chitral flash | Rapala extensa | | |
| Cryptic flash | Rapala huangi | | |
| Common red flash | Rapala iarbus | 2 | |
| Malabar flash | Rapala lankana | | Endemic |
| Slate flash | Rapala manea | 1 | |
| Brilliant flash | Rapala melida | 1 | |
| Common flash | Rapala nissa | 1 | |
| Copper flash | Rapala pheretima | 1 | |
| Shot flash | Rapala rectivitta | | |
| Rosy flash | Rapala rosacea | | |
| Scarce red flash | Rapala scintilla | 1 | Schedule 2 |
| Himalayan red flash | Rapala selira | | |
| Suffused flash | Rapala suffusa | 1 | |
| Assam flash | Rapala tara | | |
| Indigo flash | Rapala varuna | 4 | Schedule 2 |
| Lister's hairstreak | Pamela dudgeonii | | Schedule 2 |

==== Eumaeini ====
| Common name | Binomial name | Subspecies (in India) | Comments |
|---|---|---|---|
| Naga elfin | Callophrys huertasblancae | | |
| Ferruginous elfin | Callophrys leechii | | Schedule 1 |
| Chindwin elfin | Callophrys monstrabila | | |
| Mackwood's hairstreak | Satyrium mackwoodi | | Schedule 1 |
| Moore's hairstreak | Satyrium deria | | |

=== Polyommatinae ===
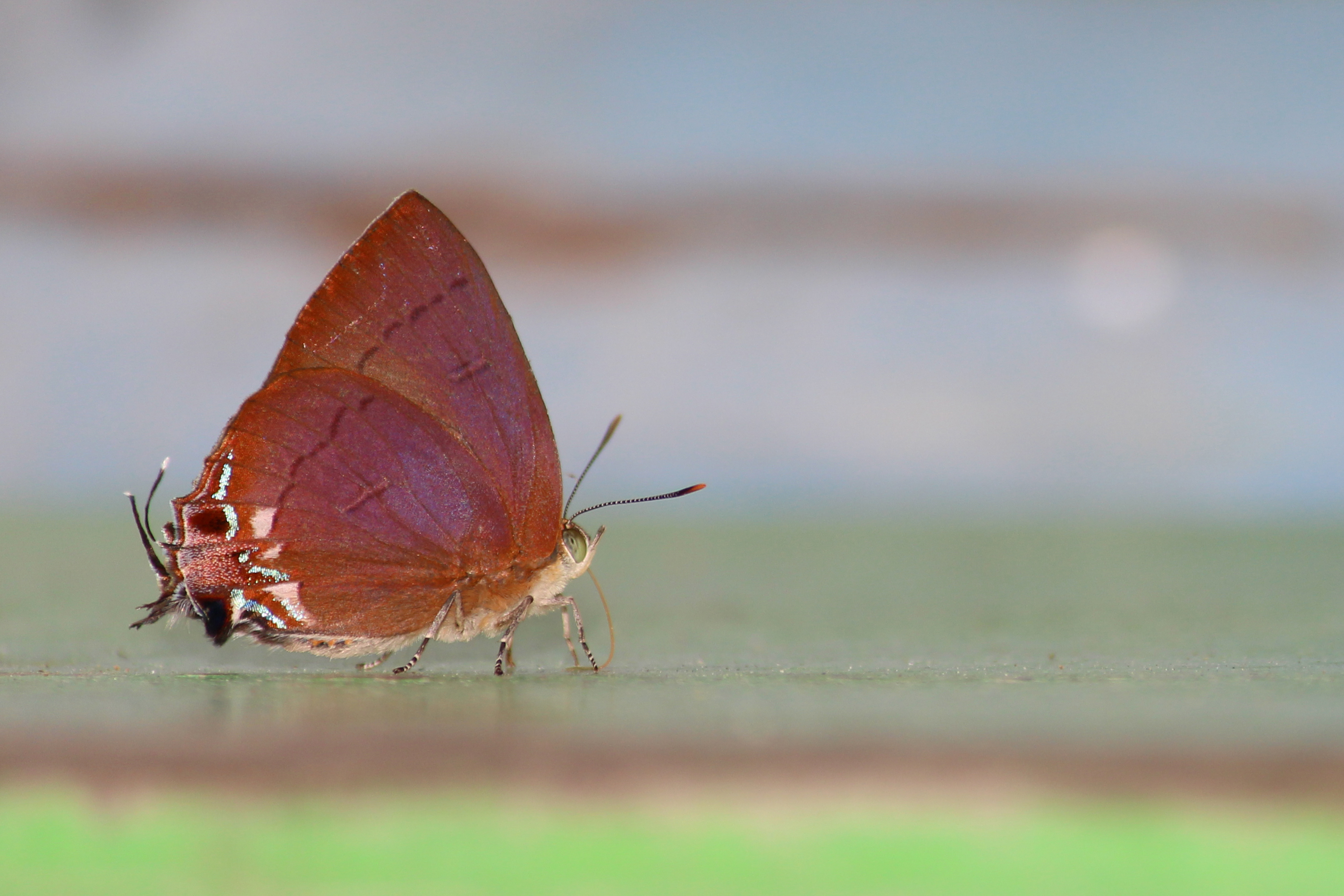
Chocolate royal, Remelana jangala

==== Remelanini ====
| Common name | Binomial name | Subspecies (in India) | Comments |
|---|---|---|---|
| Chocolate royal | Remelana jangala | 2 | Schedule 2 |
| Silver royal | Ancema blanka | 2 | Schedule 2 |
| Bi-spot royal | Ancema ctesia | 1 | |

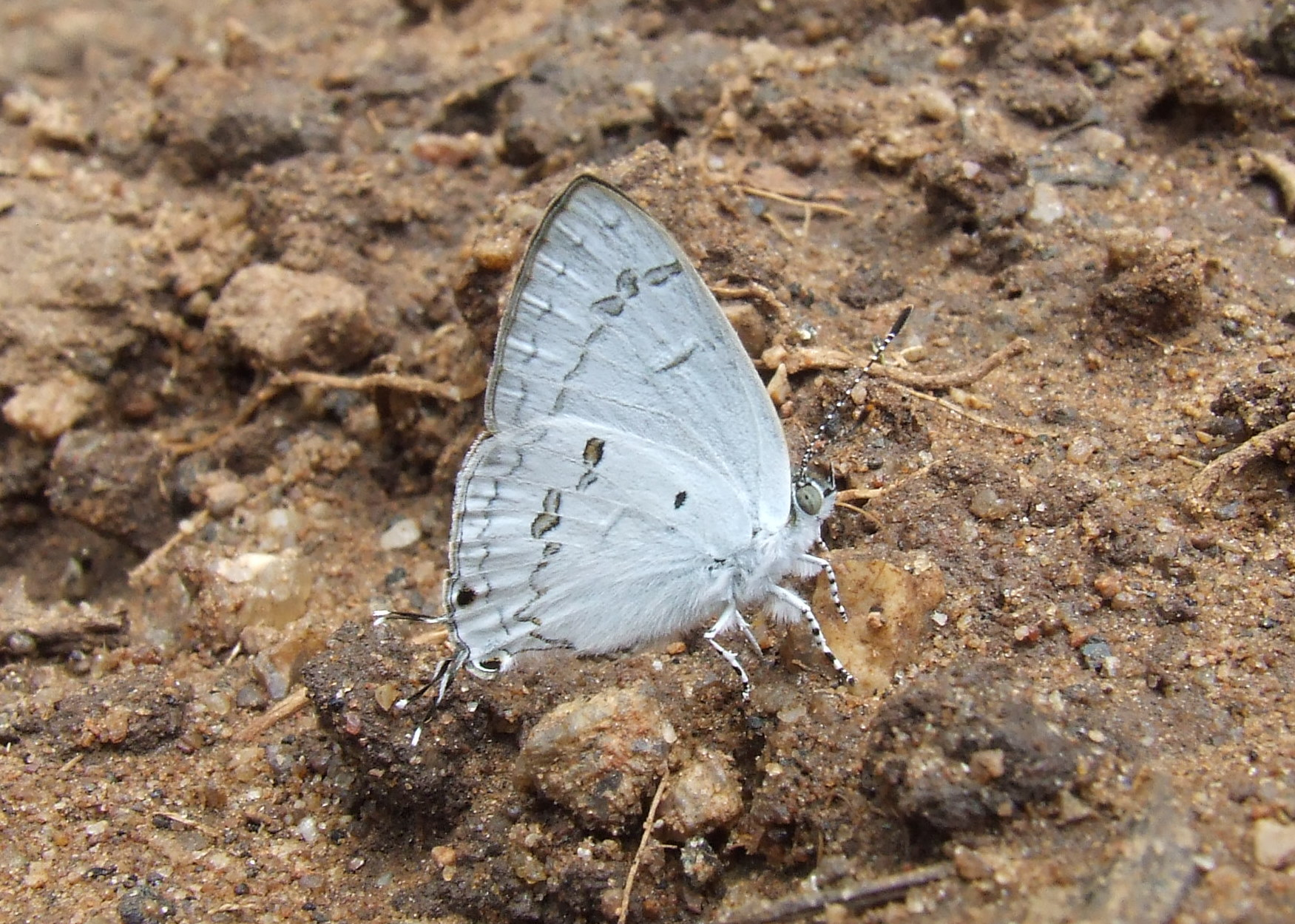
Nilgiri tit, Hypolycaena nilgirica

==== Hypolycaenini ====
| Common name | Binomial name | Subspecies (in India) | Comments |
|---|---|---|---|
| Fluffy tit | Hypolycaena amasa | 1 | |
| Common tit | Hypolycaena erylus | 2 | |
| Blue tit | Hypolycaena kina | 1 | Schedule 2 |
| Banded tit | Hypolycaena narada | | |
| Nilgiri tit | Hypolycaena nilgirica | | Schedule 2 |
| Orchid tit | Hypolycaena othona | 1 | Schedule 1 |
| Brown tit | Hypolycaena thecloides | 1 | Schedule 2 (for the Nicobar subspecies) |

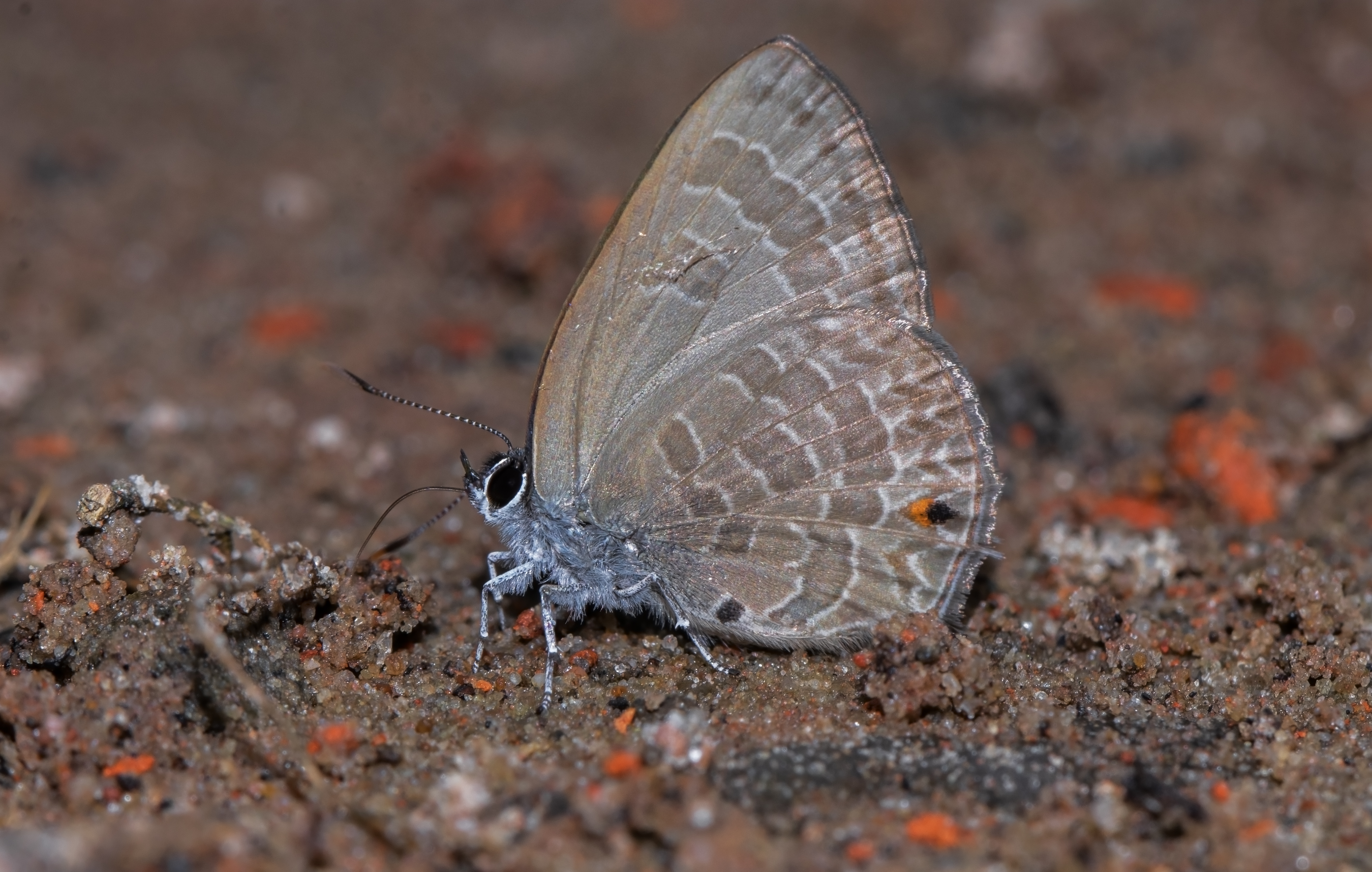
Ciliate blue, Anthene emolus

==== Lycaenesthini ====
| Common name | Binomial name | Subspecies (in India) | Comments |
|---|---|---|---|
| Ciliate blue | Anthene emolus | 2 | |
| Pointed ciliate blue | Anthene lycaenina | 2 | Schedule 2 |

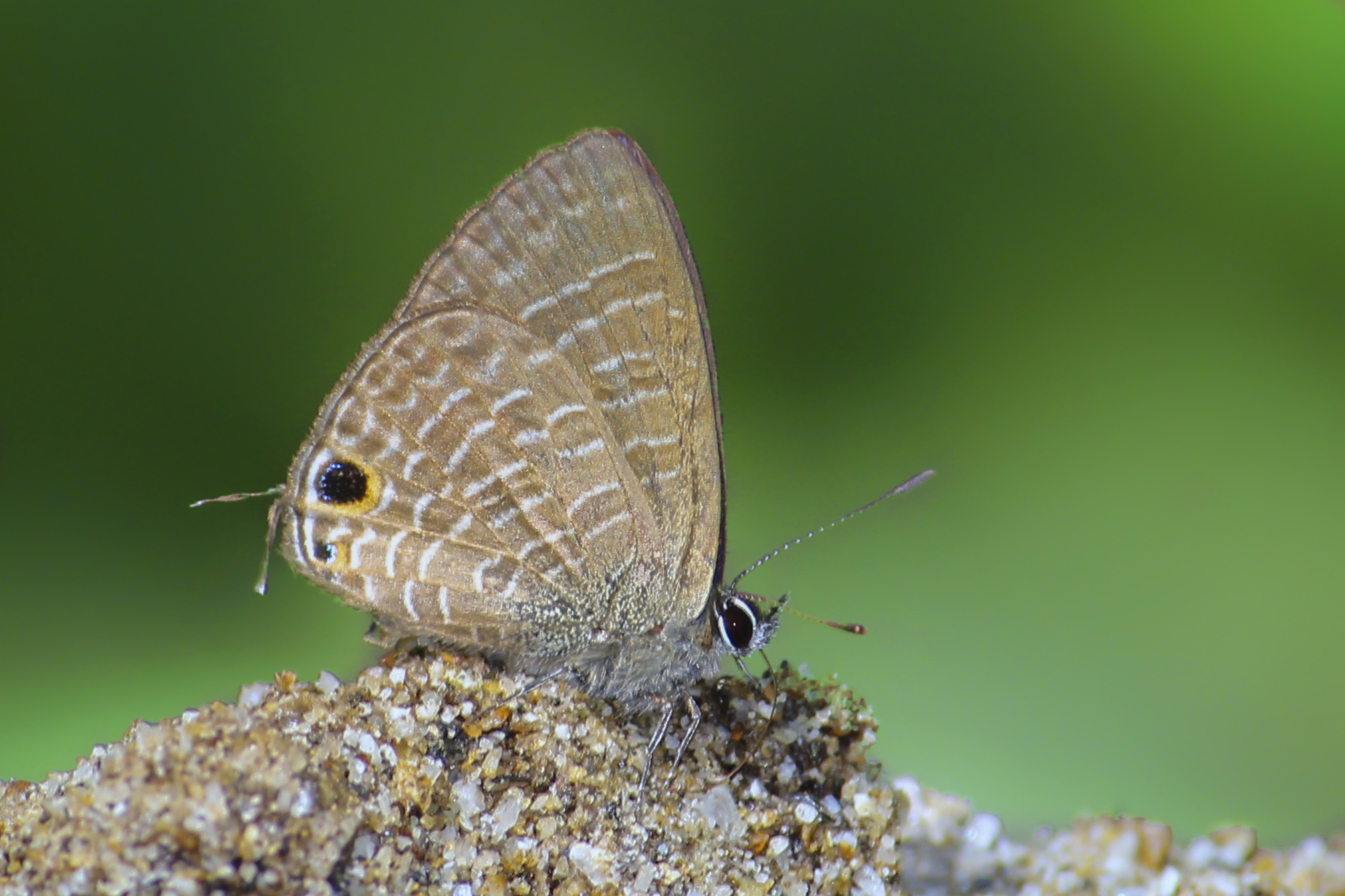
Dingy lineblue, Petrelaea dana

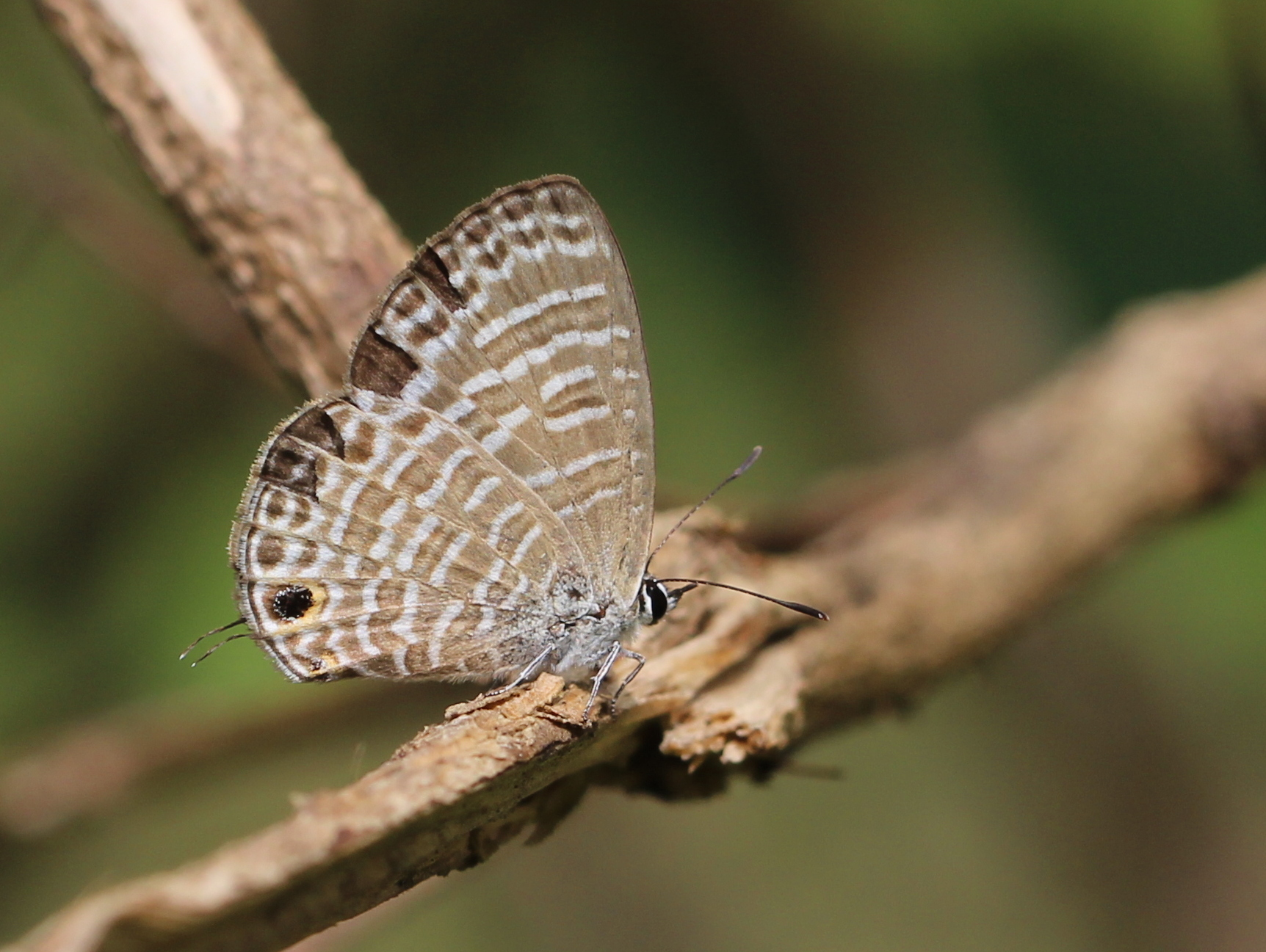
Transparent six-lineblue, Nacaduba kurava

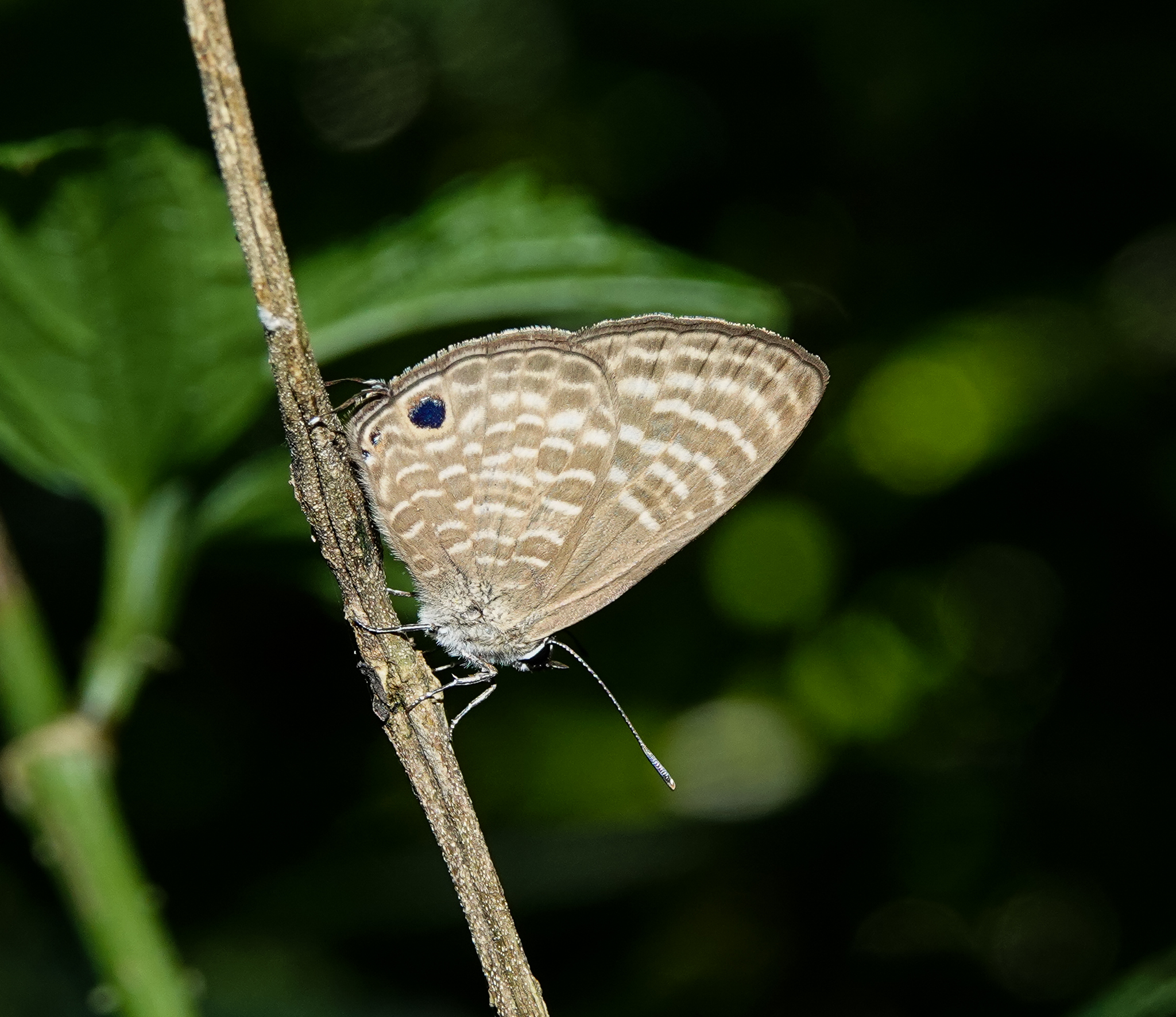
Large four-lineblue, Nacaduba pactolus

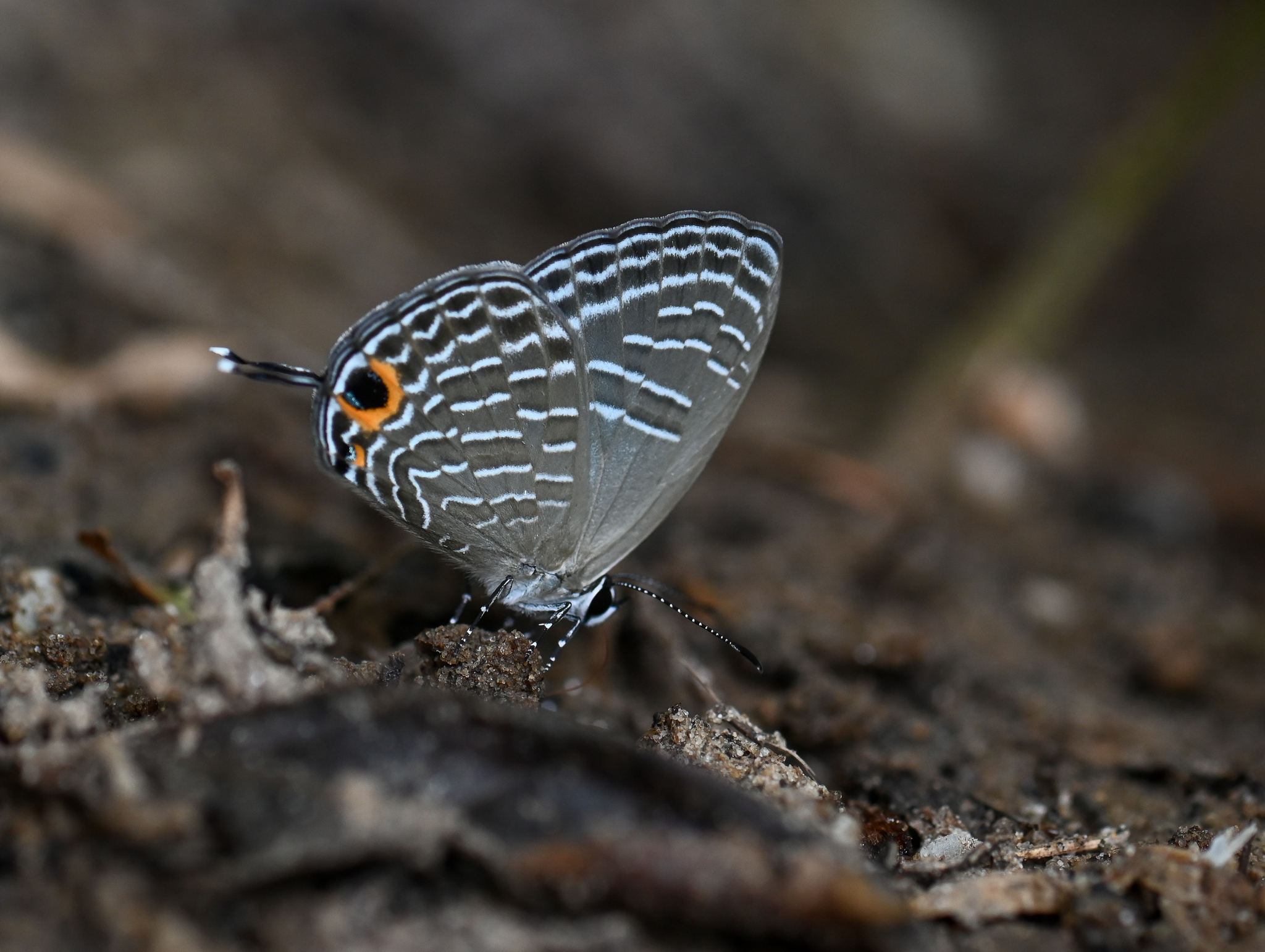
Glistening cerulean, Jamides elpis

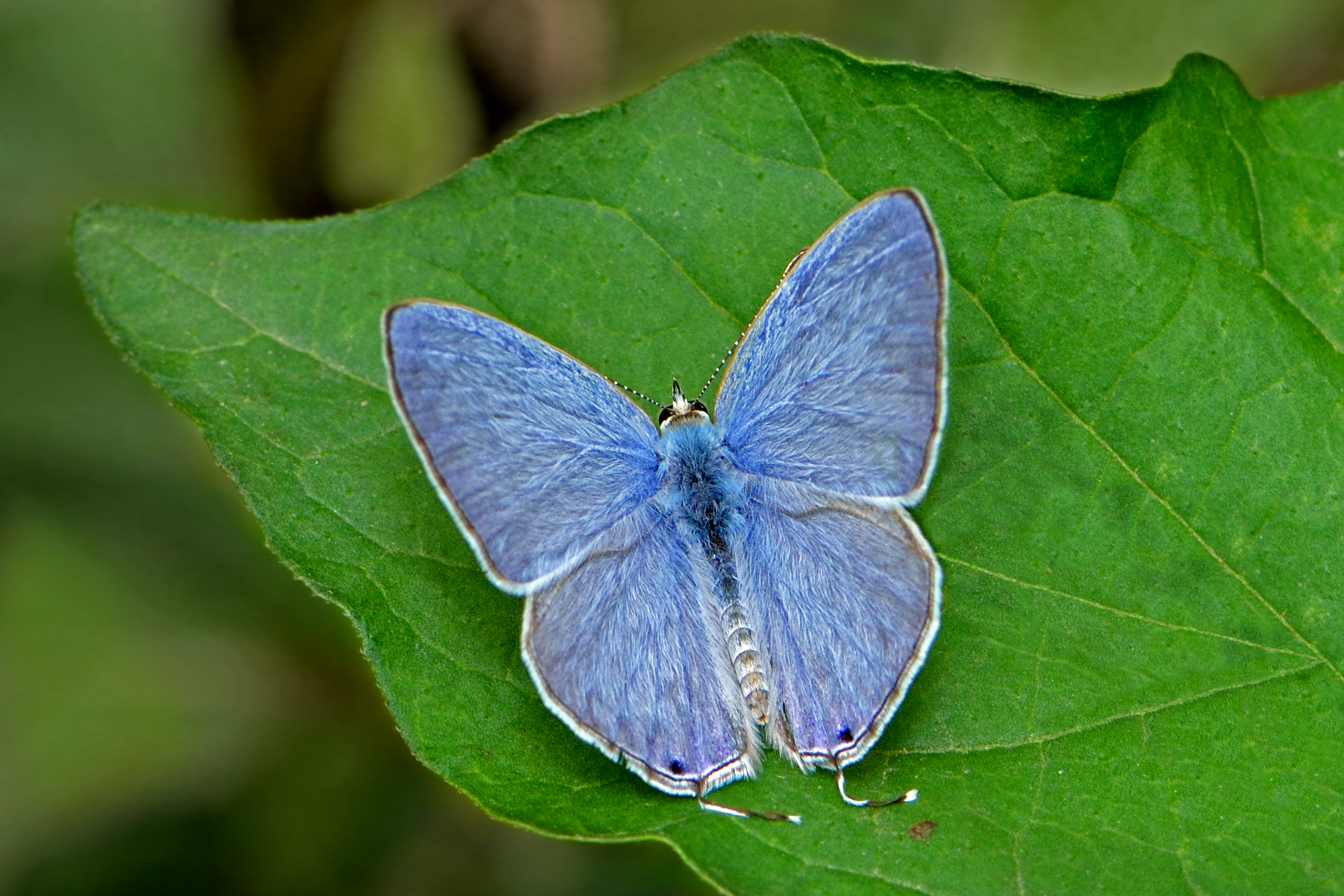
Forget-me-not, Catochrysops strabo

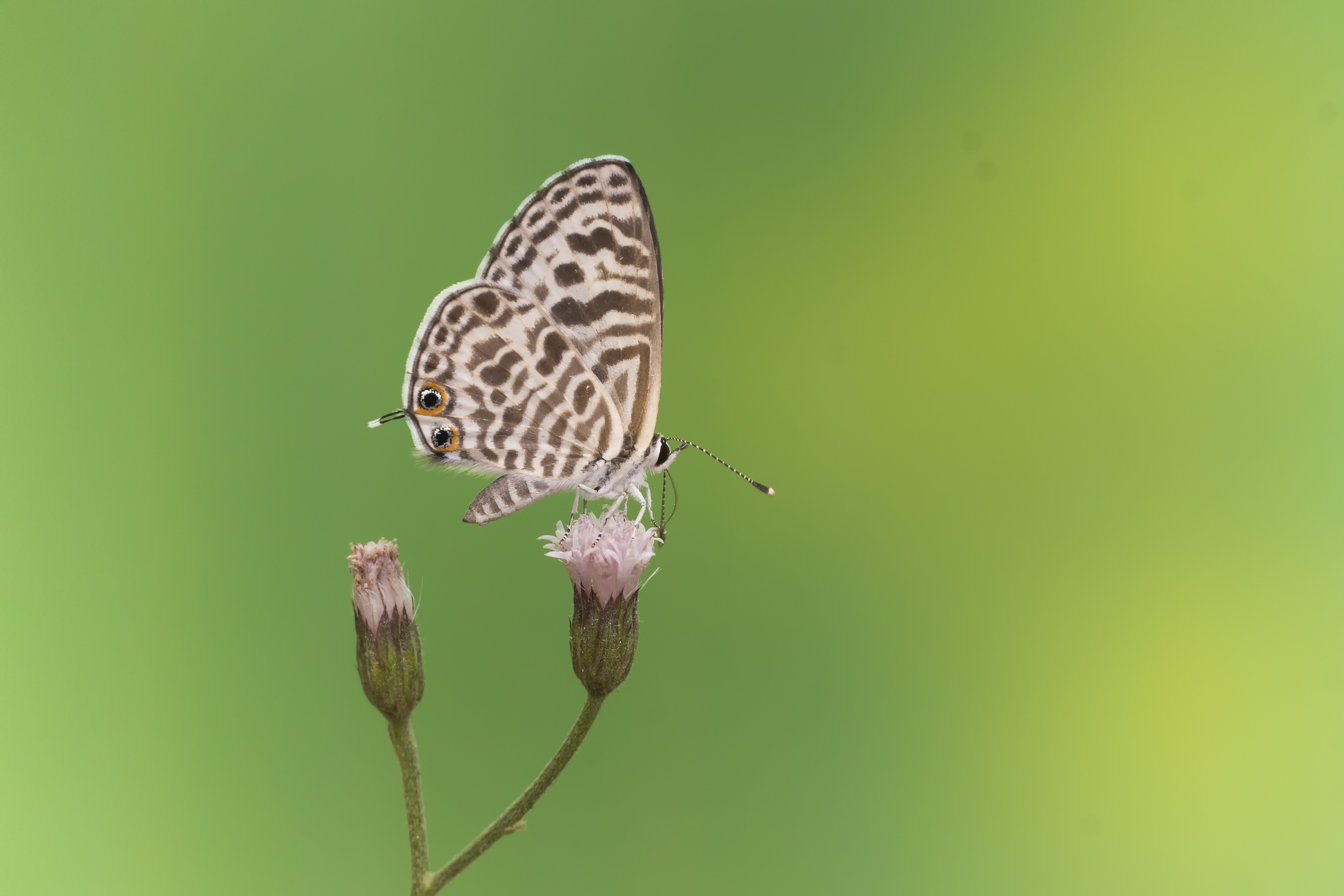
Zebra blue, Leptotes plinius

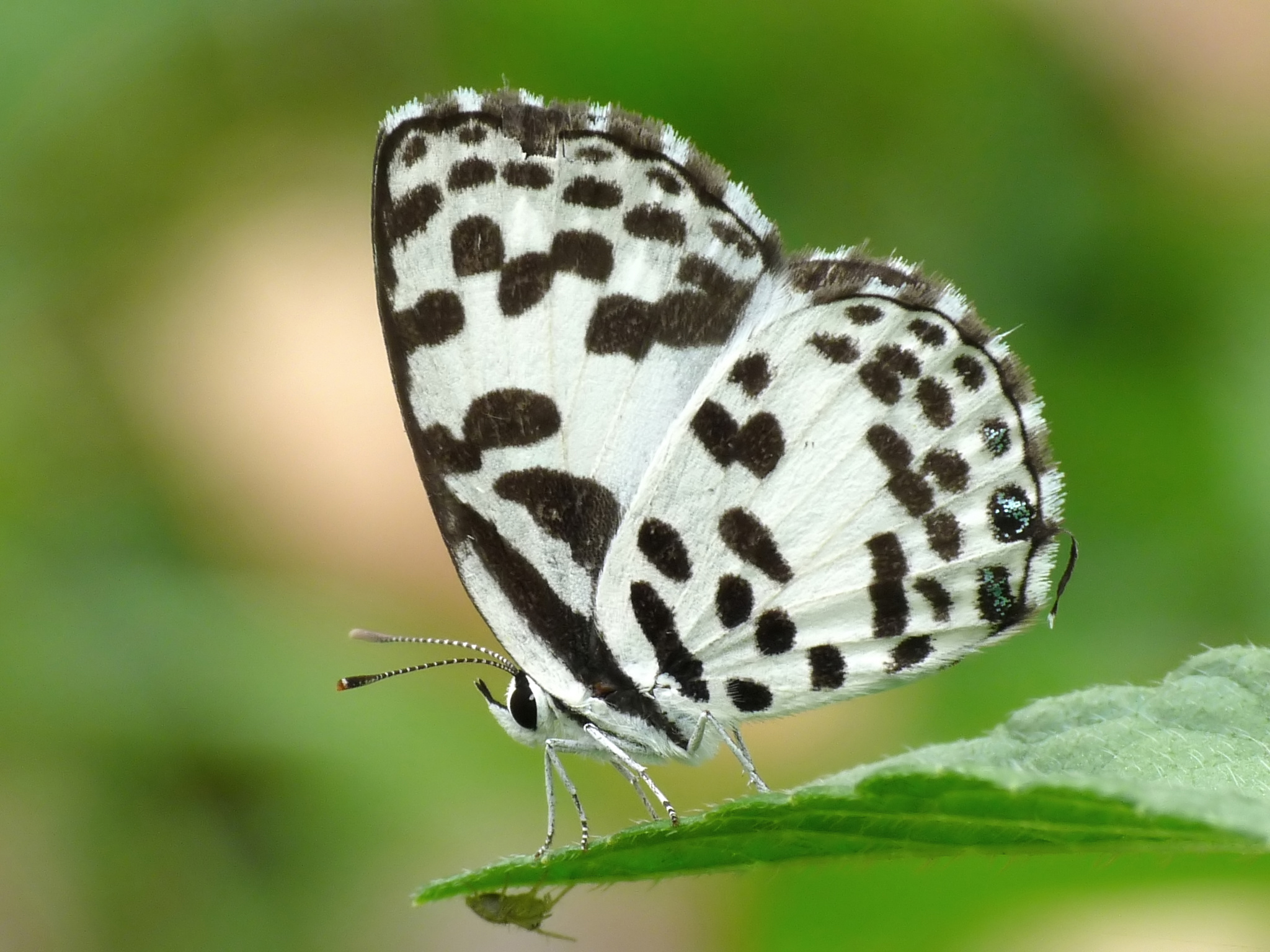
Common pierrot, Castalius rosimon

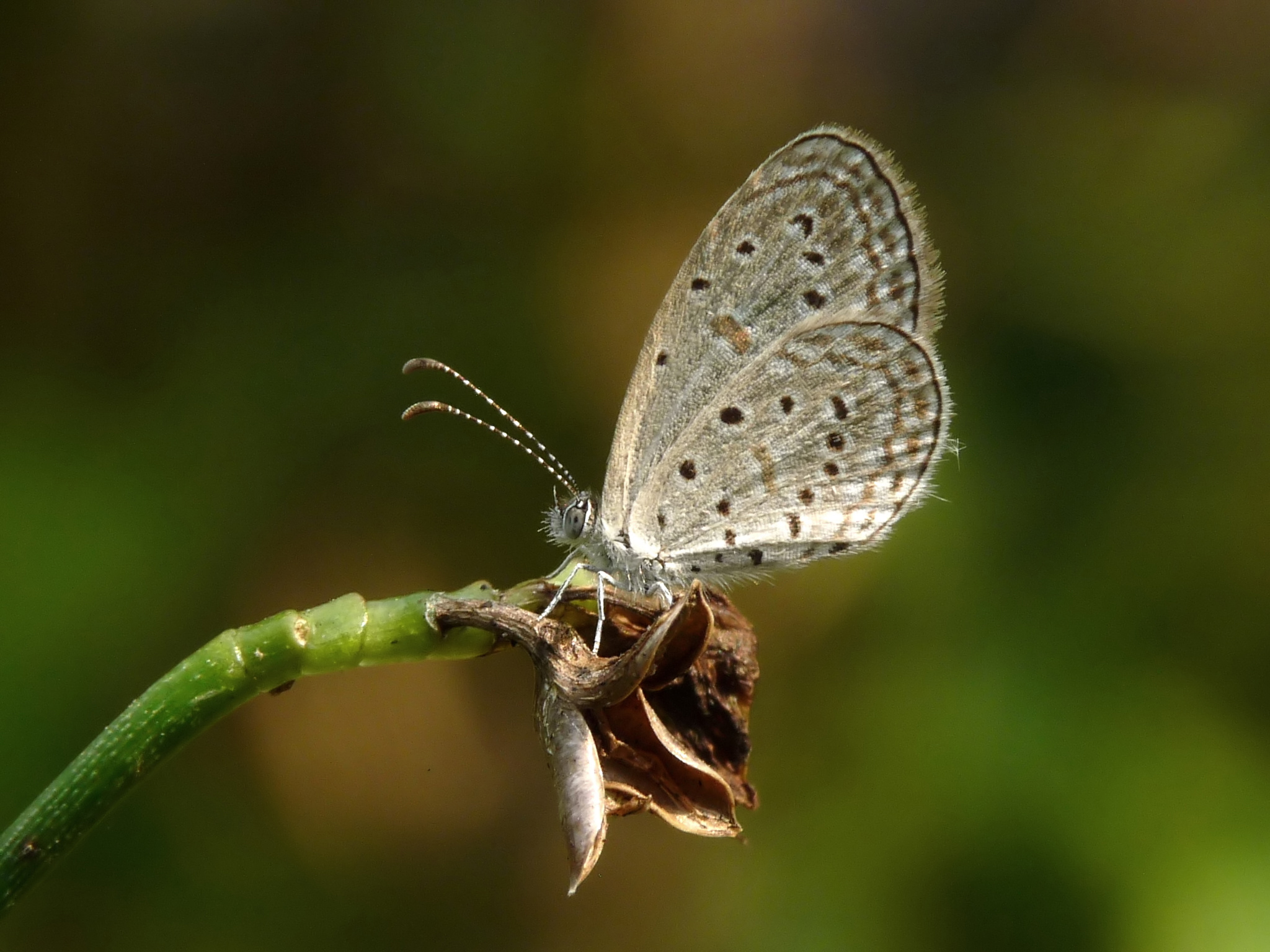
Tiny grass blue, Zizula hylax

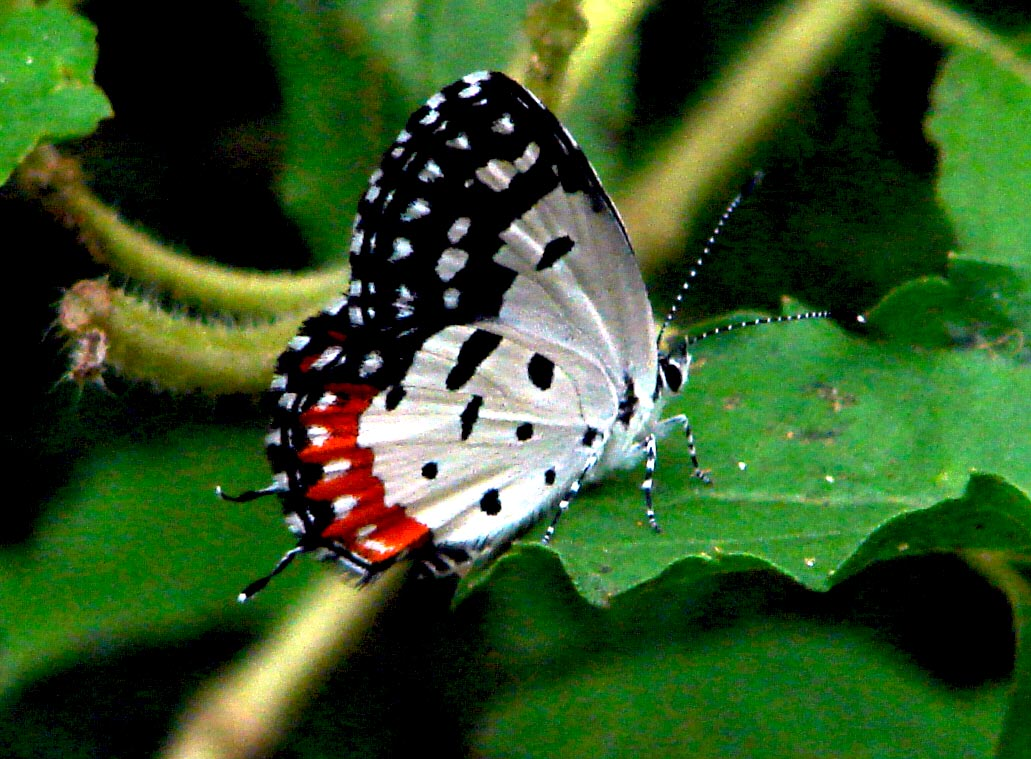
Red pierrot, Talicada nyseus

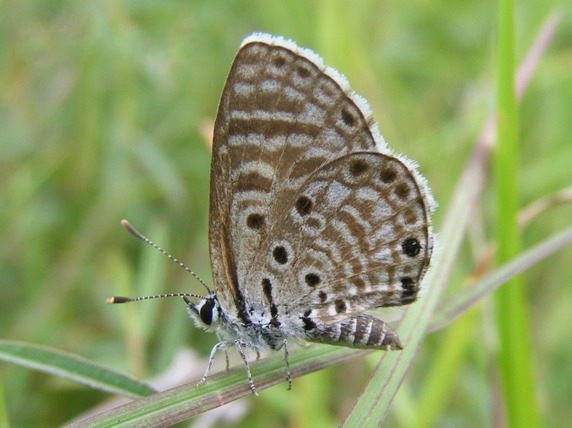
African babul blue, Azanus jesous

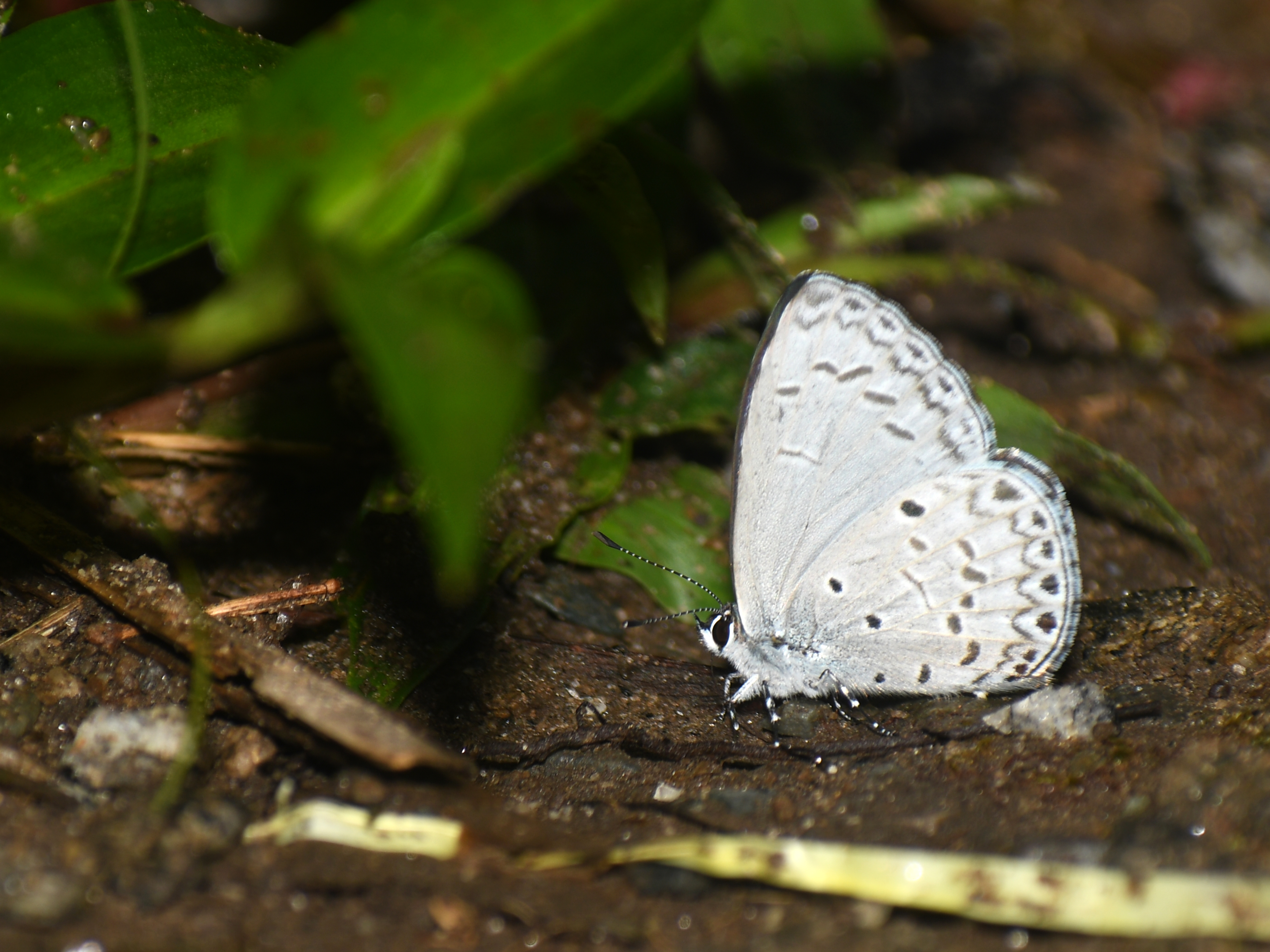
Plain hedge blue, Celastrina lavendularis

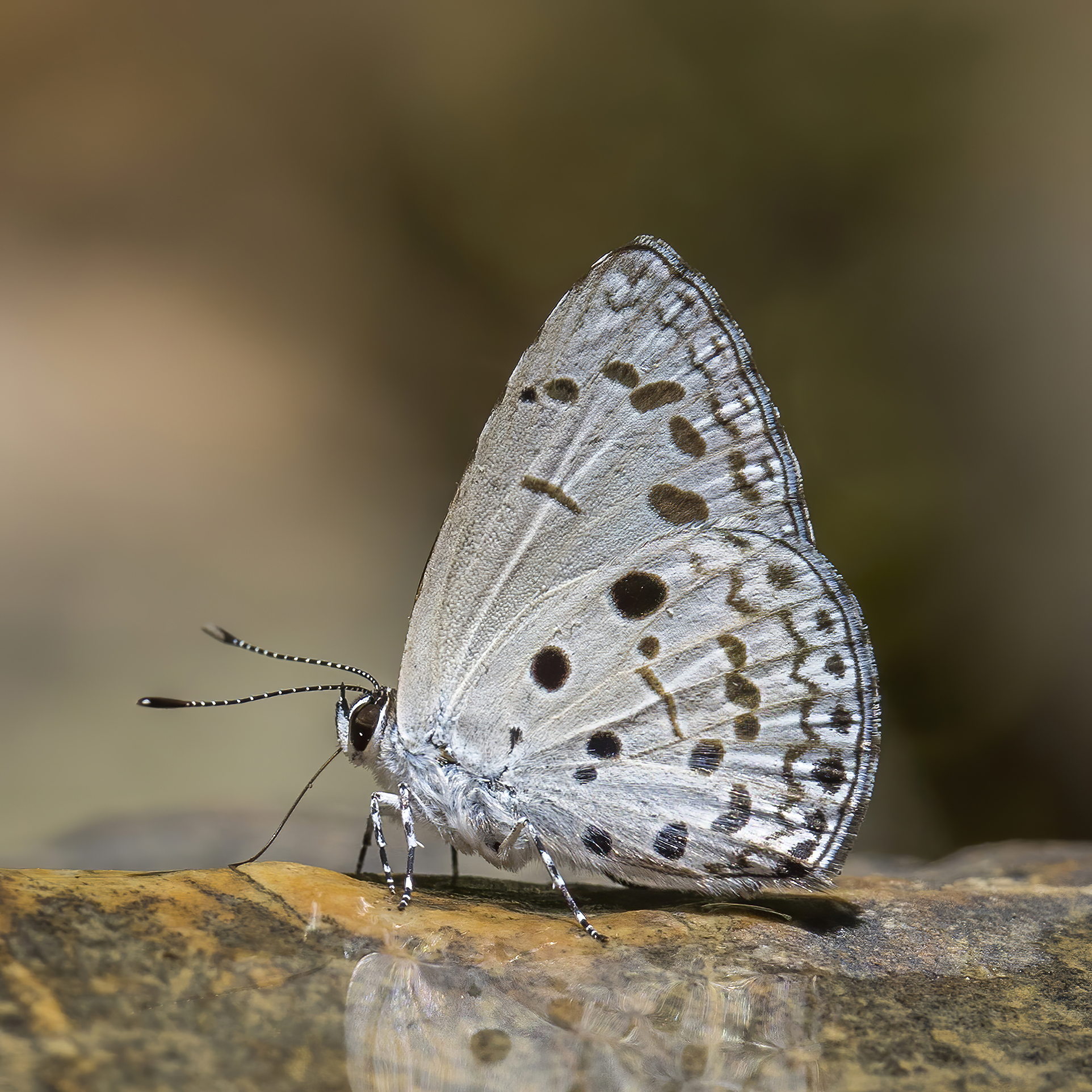
Common hedge blue, Acytolepis puspa

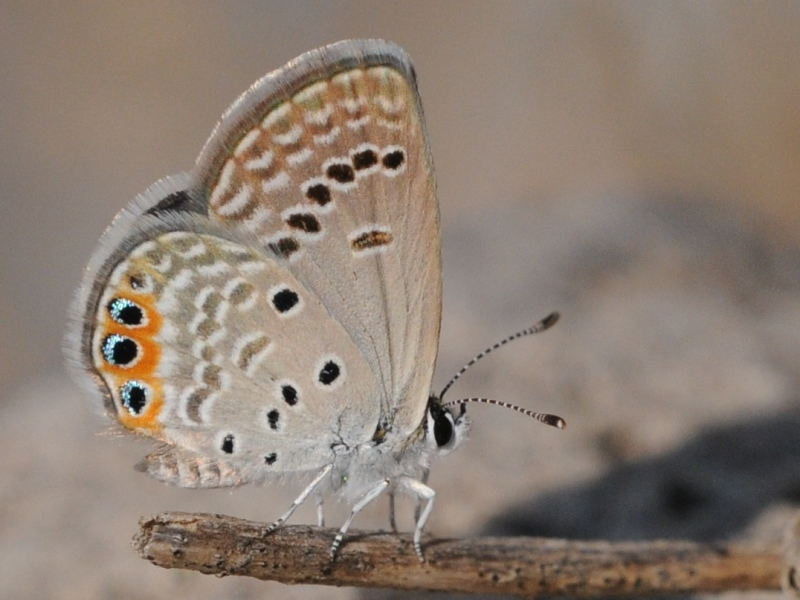
Grass jewel, Freyeria trochylus

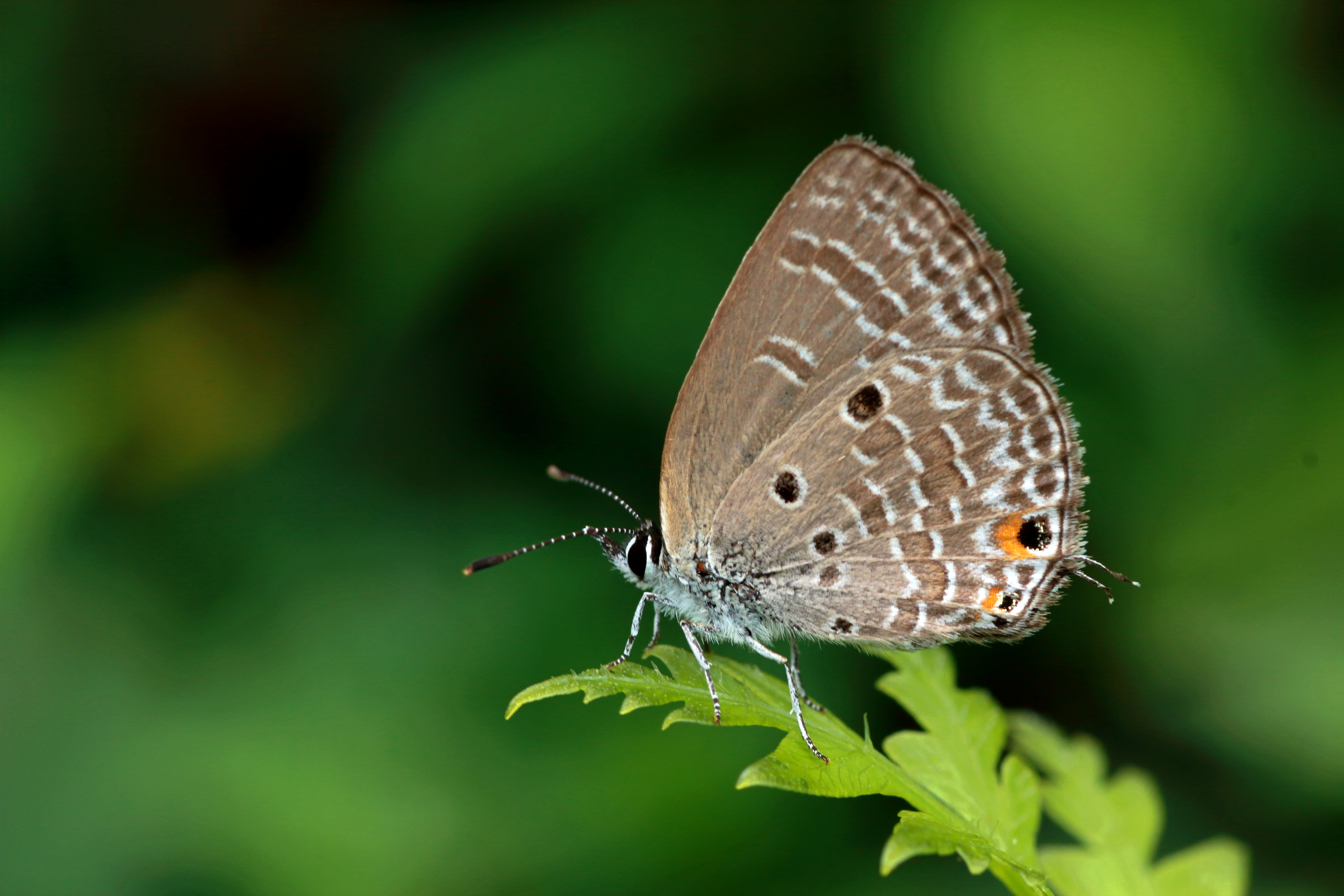
Plains cupid, Luthrodes pandava

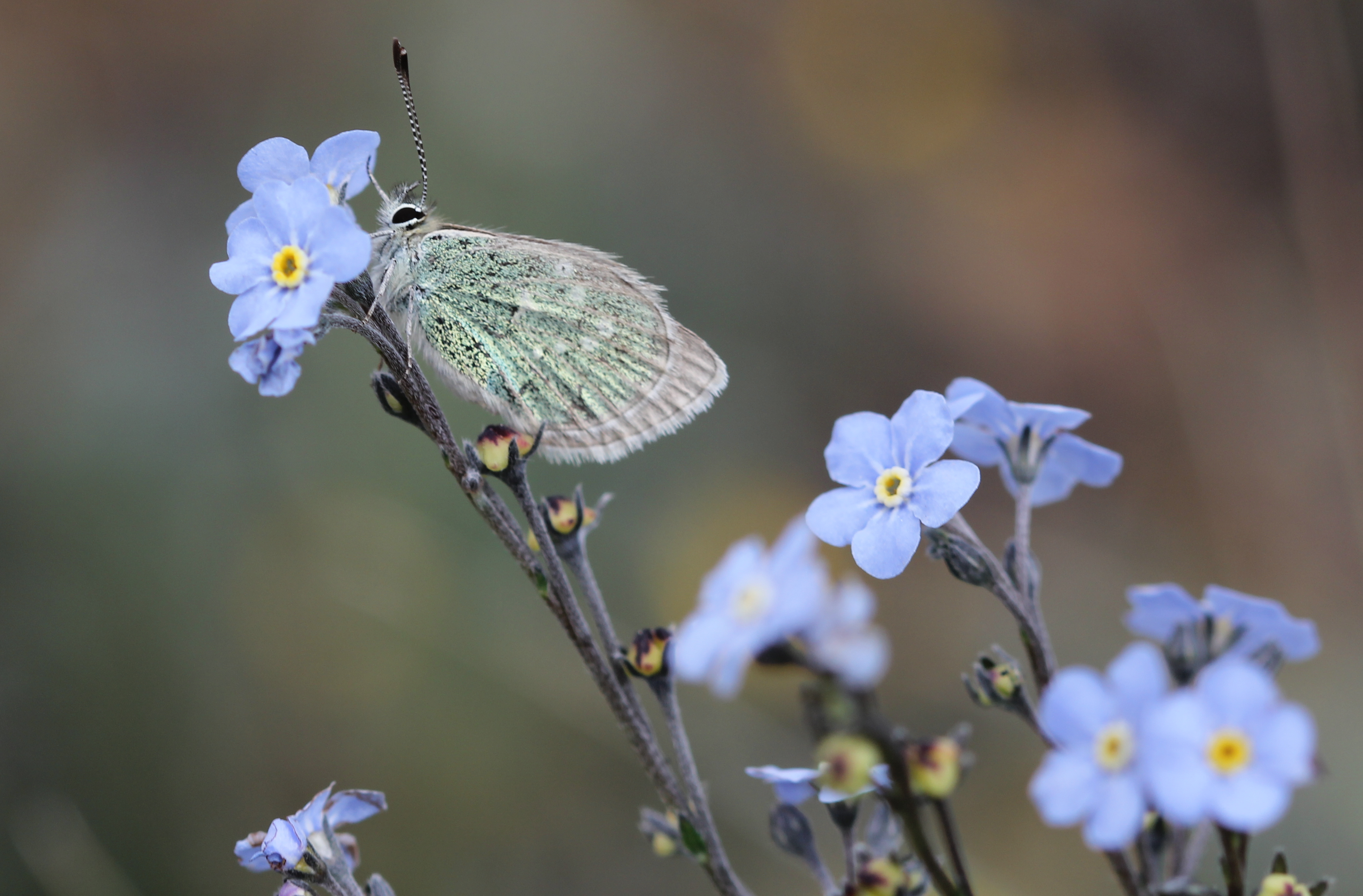
Small green underwing, Pamiria metallica

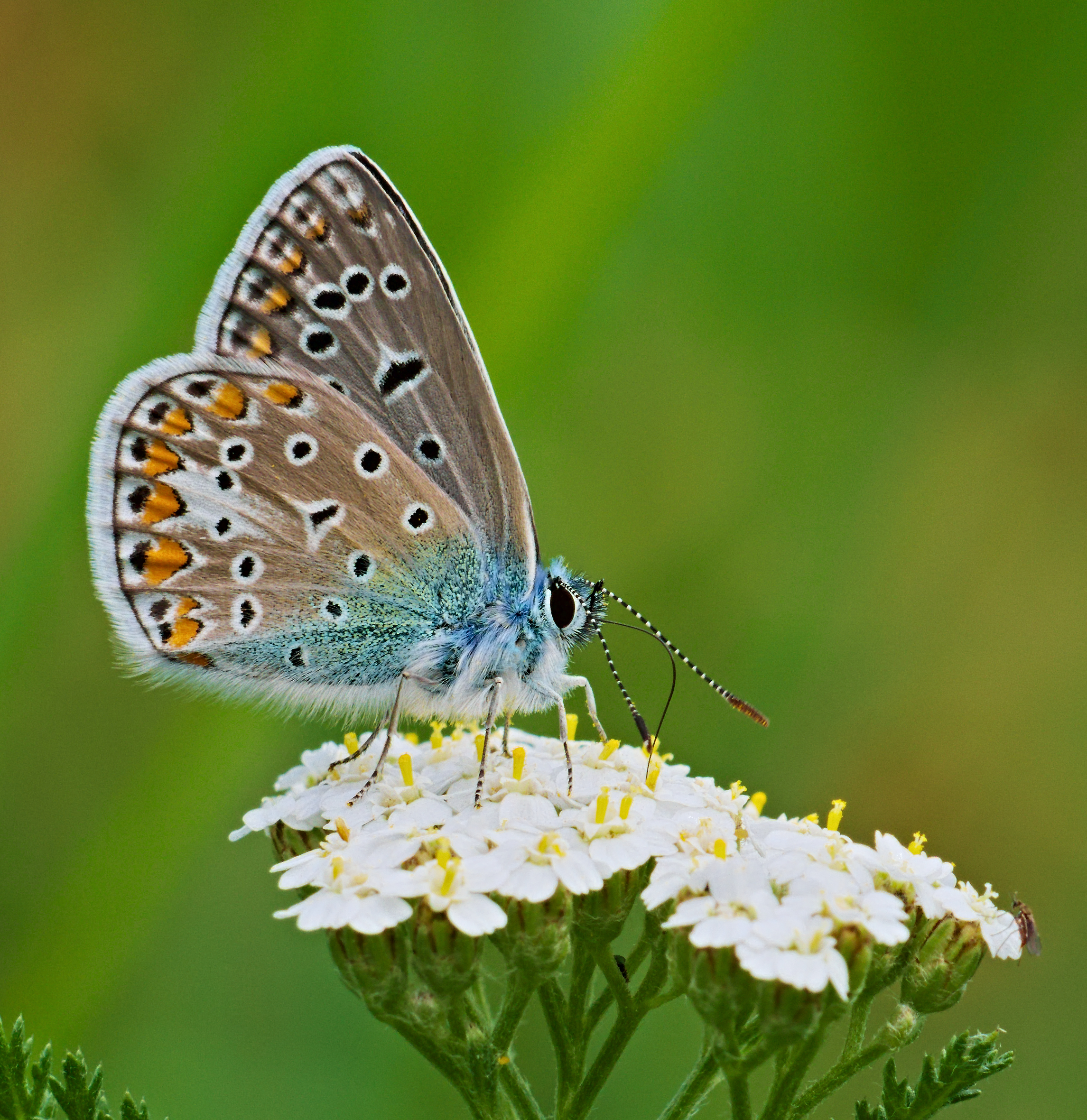
Common blue, Polyommatus icarus

==== Polyommatini ====
| Common name | Binomial name | Subspecies (in India) | Comments |
|---|---|---|---|
| Fawcett's pierrot | Niphanda asialis | 1 | |
| Pointed pierrot | Niphanda cymbia | 1 | Schedule 2 |
| Singleton | Una usta | 1 | Schedule 2 |
| Straightwing blue | Orthomiella pontis | 1 | Schedule 2 |
| Burmese straightwing blue | Orthomiella rantaizana | 1 | |
| Dingy lineblue | Petrelaea dana | | |
| Rounded six-lineblue | Nacaduba berenice | 2 | |
| Opaque six-lineblue | Nacaduba beroe | 1 | |
| Dark Ceylon six-lineblue | Nacaduba calauria | 1 | |
| Pale four-lineblue | Nacaduba hermus | 3 | Schedule 2 |
| Transparent six-lineblue | Nacaduba kurava | 3 | |
| Large four-lineblue | Nacaduba pactolus | 3 | Schedule 2 |
| Small four-lineblue | Nacaduba pavana | 2 | |
| Jewel four-lineblue | Nacaduba sanaya | 1 | |
| Pale Ceylon six-lineblue | Nacaduba sinhala | 1 | |
| Violet four-lineblue | Nacaduba subperusia | 2 | |
| Barred lineblue | Prosotas aluta | 1 | Schedule 2 |
| Bhutya lineblue | Prosotas bhutea | 1 | Schedule 2 |
| Tailless lineblue | Prosotas dubiosa | 1 | Schedule 2 |
| Brown lineblue | Prosotas lutea | 1 | |
| Common lineblue | Prosotas nora | 3 | |
| White-tipped lineblue | Prosotas noreia | 1 | Schedule 2 |
| Margined lineblue | Prosotas pia | 1 | |
| Pointed lineblue | Ionolyce helicon | 4 | Schedule 2 |
| Felder's lineblue | Catopyrops ancyra | 1 | Schedule 2 |
| Angled pierrot | Caleta decidia | 1 | |
| Elbowed pierrot | Caleta elna | 1 | |
| Straight pierrot | Caleta roxus | 2 | Schedule 2 |
| Banded blue pierrot | Discolampa ethion | 2 | |
| Metallic cerulean | Jamides alecto | 3 | Schedule 2 |
| Dark cerulean | Jamides bochus | 1 | |
| Royal cerulean | Jamides caeruleus | 1 | Schedule 2 |
| Common cerulean | Jamides celeno | 4 | |
| Glistening cerulean | Jamides elpis | 2 | |
| Ferrar's cerulean | Jamides ferrari | 1 | Schedule 1 |
| Frosted cerulean | Jamides kankena | 1 | Schedule 2 |
| White cerulean | Jamides pura | 1 | Schedule 2 |
| Silver forget-me-not | Catochrysops panormus | 2 | |
| Forget-me-not | Catochrysops strabo | 1 | |
| Pea blue | Lampides boeticus | | |
| Zebra blue | Leptotes plinius | | |
| Common pierrot | Castalius rosimon | 1 | |
| Dark pierrot | Tarucus ananda | | |
| Black-spotted pierrot | Tarucus balkanica | 1 | |
| Spotted pierrot | Tarucus callinara | | Schedule 2 |
| Hazara pierrot | Tarucus hazara | | |
| Indian pierrot | Tarucus indica | | |
| Striped pierrot | Tarucus nara | | |
| Himalayan pierrot | Tarucus venosus | | |
| Assam pierrot | Tarucus waterstradti | 1 | Schedule 2 |
| Dark grass blue | Zizeeria karsandra | | |
| Pale grass blue | Pseudozizeeria maha | 2 | |
| Lesser grass blue | Zizina otis | 1 | |
| Tiny grass blue | Zizula hylax | 1 | |
| Shandur cupid | Cupido buddhista | | |
| Pamir cupid | Everes alaina | | |
| Tailed cupid | Everes argiades | 2 | |
| Indian cupid | Lacturnea lacturnus | 3 | |
| Dusky-blue cupid | Huegelia huegelii | 2 | |
| Dull cupid | Huegelia irungbami | | |
| Gilgit mountain blue | Iolana gigantea | 1 | |
| Hedge cupid | Bothrinia chennellii | 1 | Schedule 2 |
| Black cupid | Tongeia kala | | Schedule 2 |
| False Tibetan cupid | Tongeia pseudozuthus | | |
| Moore's cupid | Shijimia moorei | 1 | |
| Red pierrot | Talicada nyseus | 3 | |
| Forest quaker | Pithecops corvus | 1 | |
| Blue quaker | Pithecops fulgens | 1 | Schedule 2 |
| African babul blue | Azanus jesous | 1 | |
| Bright babul blue | Azanus ubaldus | | |
| Dull babul blue | Azanus uranus | | |
| Quaker | Neopithecops zalmora | 3 | |
| Malayan | Megisba malaya | 3 | Schedule 2 |
| Holly blue | Celastrina argiolus | 2 | |
| Silvery hedge blue | Celastrina gigas | | |
| Mishmi hedge blue | Celastrina hersilia | 1 | |
| Large hedge blue | Celastrina huegelii | 2 | |
| Plain hedge blue | Celastrina lavendularis | 2 | |
| Khasi hedge blue | Celastrina oreas | 1 | |
| White-banded hedge blue | Lestranicus transpectus | | |
| Whitedisc hedge blue | Celatoxia albidisca | | |
| Margined hedge blue | Celatoxia marginata | 1 | |
| Chapman's hedge blue | Notarthinus binghami | | Schedule 1 |
| Hampson's hedge blue | Acytolepis lilacea | 1 | Schedule 2 |
| Common hedge blue | Acytolepis puspa | 4 | |
| Naga hedge blue | Oreolyce dohertyi | | Schedule 1 |
| Dusky hedge blue | Oreolyce vardhana | 2 | |
| Metallic hedge blue | Callenya melaena | 1 | Schedule 2 |
| Swinhoe's hedge blue | Monodontides musina | 1 | |
| White hedge blue | Udara akasa | 1 | |
| Albocerulean | Udara albocaerulea | 1 | Schedule 2 |
| Pale hedge blue | Udara dilectus | 1 | |
| Narrow-bordered hedge blue | Udara placidula | 1 | |
| Bicolored hedge blue | Udara selma | 1 | |
| Singhalese hedge blue | Udara singalensis | | |
| Gram blue | Euchrysops cnejus | 1 | |
| Small grass jewel | Freyeria putli | 1 | |
| Grass jewel | Freyeria trochylus | 1 | |
| Plains cupid | Luthrodes pandava | | |
| Lime blue | Chilades lajus | 1 | |
| Small cupid | Chilades parrhasius | 1 | |
| Chitral argus blue | Turanana chitrali | | |
| Eastern baton blue | Pseudophilotes vicrama | 2 | |
| Great spotted blue | Phengaris atroguttata | 1 | Schedule 2 |
| Pamir jewel blue | Plebejus eversmanni | 1 | Schedule 2 |
| Ladakh jewel blue | Plebejus samudra | | |
| Orange-bordered argus blue | Aricia agestis | 1 | |
| Northern brown argus | Aricia artaxerxes | 1 | |
| Astor argus blue | Eumedonia astorica | | |
| Streaked argus blue | Eumedonia eumedon | | |
| White-ringed argus blue | Grumiana annulata | | |
| Kamba mountain blue | Agriades arcaseia | | |
| Azure mountain blue | Agriades asiatica | | |
| Common mountain blue | Agriades lehanus | | |
| Alpine mountain blue | Agriades orbitulus | 1 | |
| Sikkim mountain blue | Agriades sikhima | | |
| Greenish mountain blue | Agriades jaloka | 4 | |
| Evans' mountain blue | Agriades morsheadi | | |
| Tien Shan mountain blue | Agriades pheretiades | | |
| Golden green underwing | Pamiria chrysopis | 2 | |
| Large green underwing | Pamiria galathea | 3 | |
| Small green underwing | Pamiria metallica | 1 | |
| Dusky green underwing | Pamiria omphisa | | |
| Sikkim green underwing | Pamiria sikkima | | |
| Garwhal green underwing | Pamiria wojtusiaki | | |
| Chumbi green underwing | Patricius younghusbandi | 2 | Schedule 2 |
| Large jewel blue | Plebejidea loewii | 1 | |
| Baluchi jewel blue | Kretania beani | | |
| Bálint's meadow blue | Kretania csomai | | |
| Chitral argus blue | Afarsia ashretha | 1 | |
| Jewel argus blue | Afarsia hanna | | |
| Afghan meadow blue | Alpherakya bellona | | |
| Dusky meadow blue | Alpherakya devanica | 1 | Schedule 2 |
| Rupal meadow blue | Alpherakya rupala | | |
| Ladakh meadow blue | Alpherakya sartoides | | |
| Lahaul meadow blue | Polyommatus ariana | | |
| Kumaon meadow blue | Polyommatus dux | 2 | |
| Briliant meadow blue | Polyommatus florenciae | | |
| Hunza meadow blue | Polyommatus hunza | | |
| Common blue | Polyommatus icarus | 1 | |
| Gilgit meadow blue | Polyommatus icadius | | |
| Kashmir meadow blue | Polyommatus pseuderos | | |
| Beautiful meadow blue | Polyommatus pulchella | | |
| Himalayan meadow blue | Polyommatus stoliczkana | 3 | |

== Nymphalidae ==
The Nymphalidae or brush-footed butterflies are the largest family of butterflies by number of species (more than 6000 species are described). They are medium sized to large butterflies and are often easily distinguishable in the field. The uppersides are usually more vibrantly colored than the undersides. Most species can be found basking in the sun or visiting flowers and over-ripe fruits. There are 500 species of this family found in India.

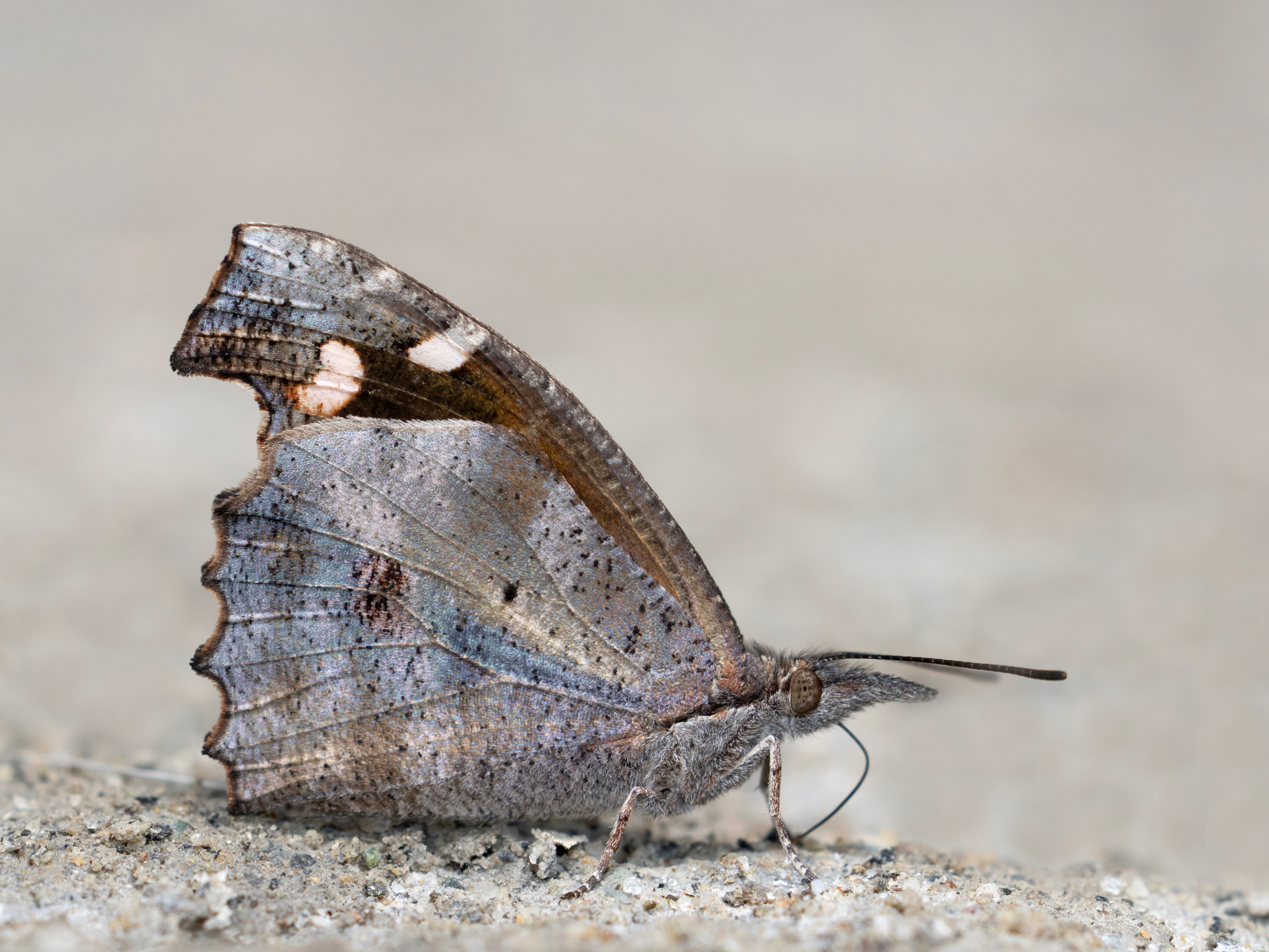
Common beak, Libythea lepita

=== Libytheinae ===
| Common name | Binomial name | Subspecies (in India) | Comments |
|---|---|---|---|
| Common beak | Libythea lepita | 2 | Schedule 2 |
| Club beak | Libythea myrrha | 2 | |
| White-spotted beak | Libythea narina | 1 | |

=== Danainae ===
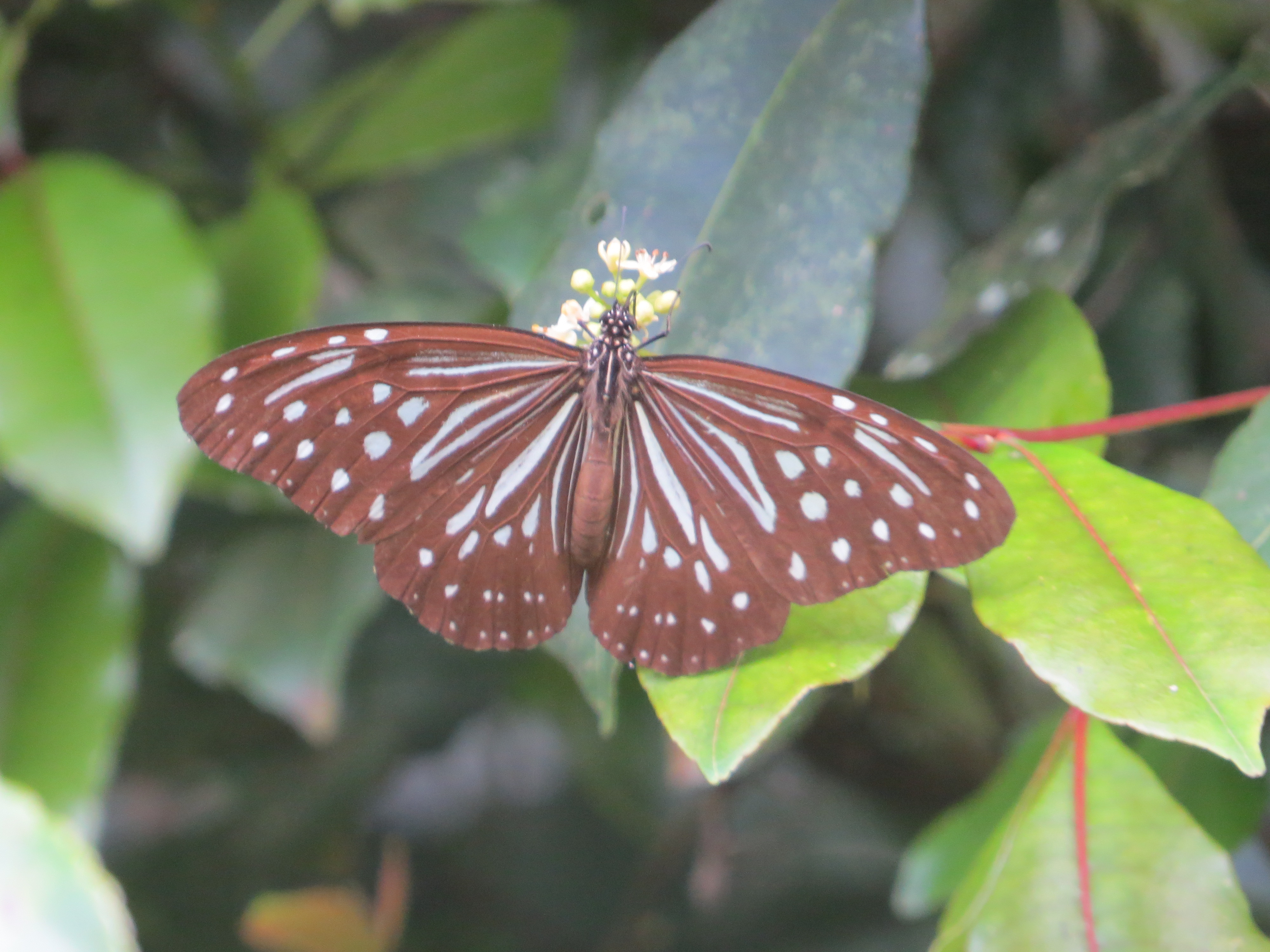
Nilgiri tiger, Parantica nilgiriensis

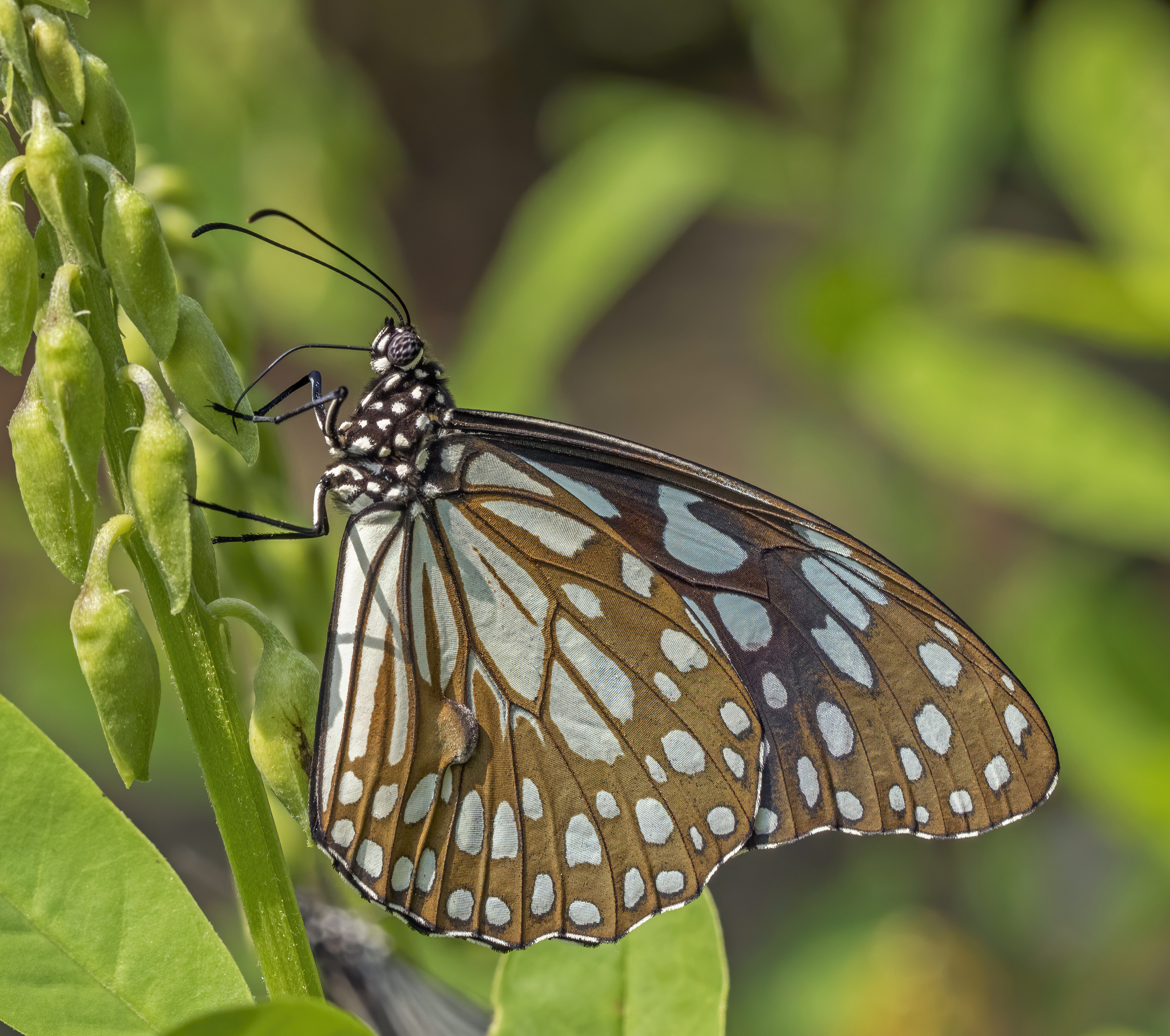
Blue tiger, Tirumala limniace

==== Danaini ====
| Common name | Binomial name | Subspecies (in India) | Comments |
|---|---|---|---|
| Glassy tiger | Parantica aglea | 3 | |
| Dark glassy tiger | Parantica agleoides | 1 | |
| Chocolate tiger | Parantica melaneus | | |
| Nilgiri tiger | Parantica nilgiriensis | | Endemic |
| Talbot's chestnut tiger | Parantica pedonga | | |
| Chestnut tiger | Parantica sita | 1 | |
| Swinhoe's chocolate tiger | Parantica swinhoei | 1 | |
| Grey glassy tiger | Ideopsis juventa | 1 | |
| Blue glassy tiger | Ideopsis similis | 1 | |
| Scarce blue tiger | Tirumala gautama | 1 | Schedule 1 |
| Blue tiger | Tirumala limniace | 1 | |
| Dark blue tiger | Tirumala septentrionis | 2 | |
| Malay tiger | Danaus affinis | 1 | |
| Plain tiger | Danaus chrysippus | 1 | |
| Common tiger | Danaus genutia | 1 | |
| White tiger | Danaus melanippus | 3 | |

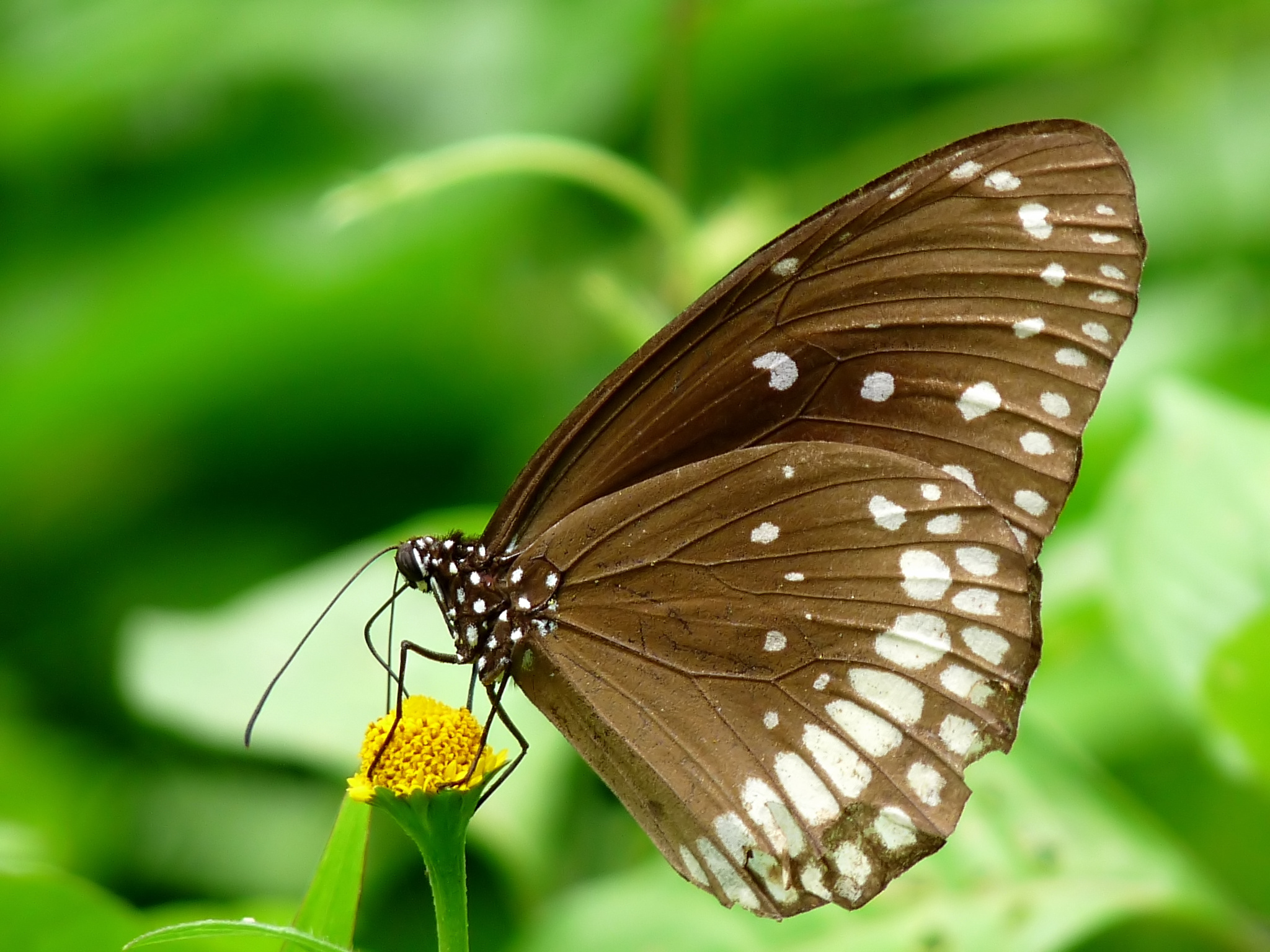
Common crow, Euploea core

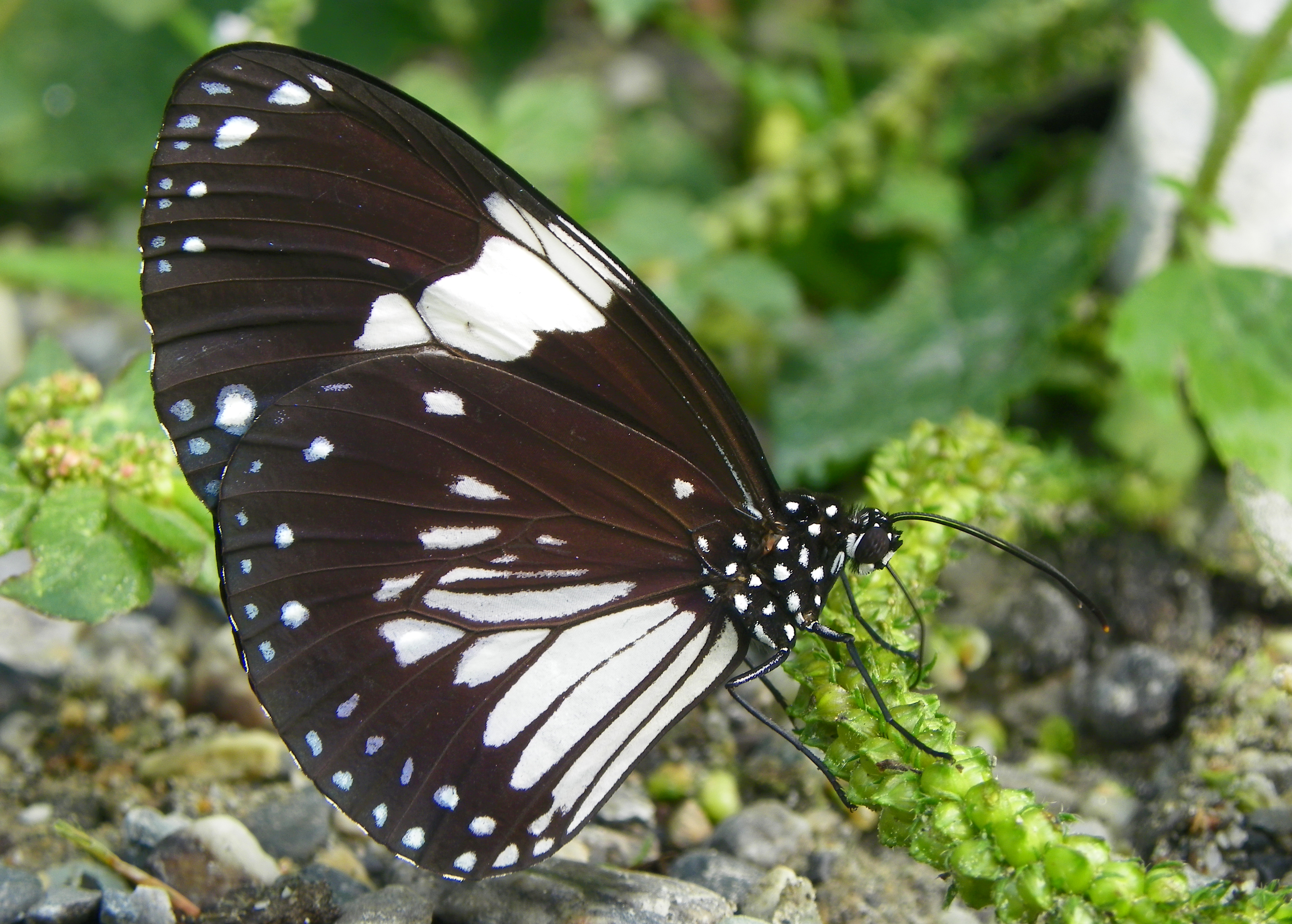
Magpie crow, Euploea radamanthus

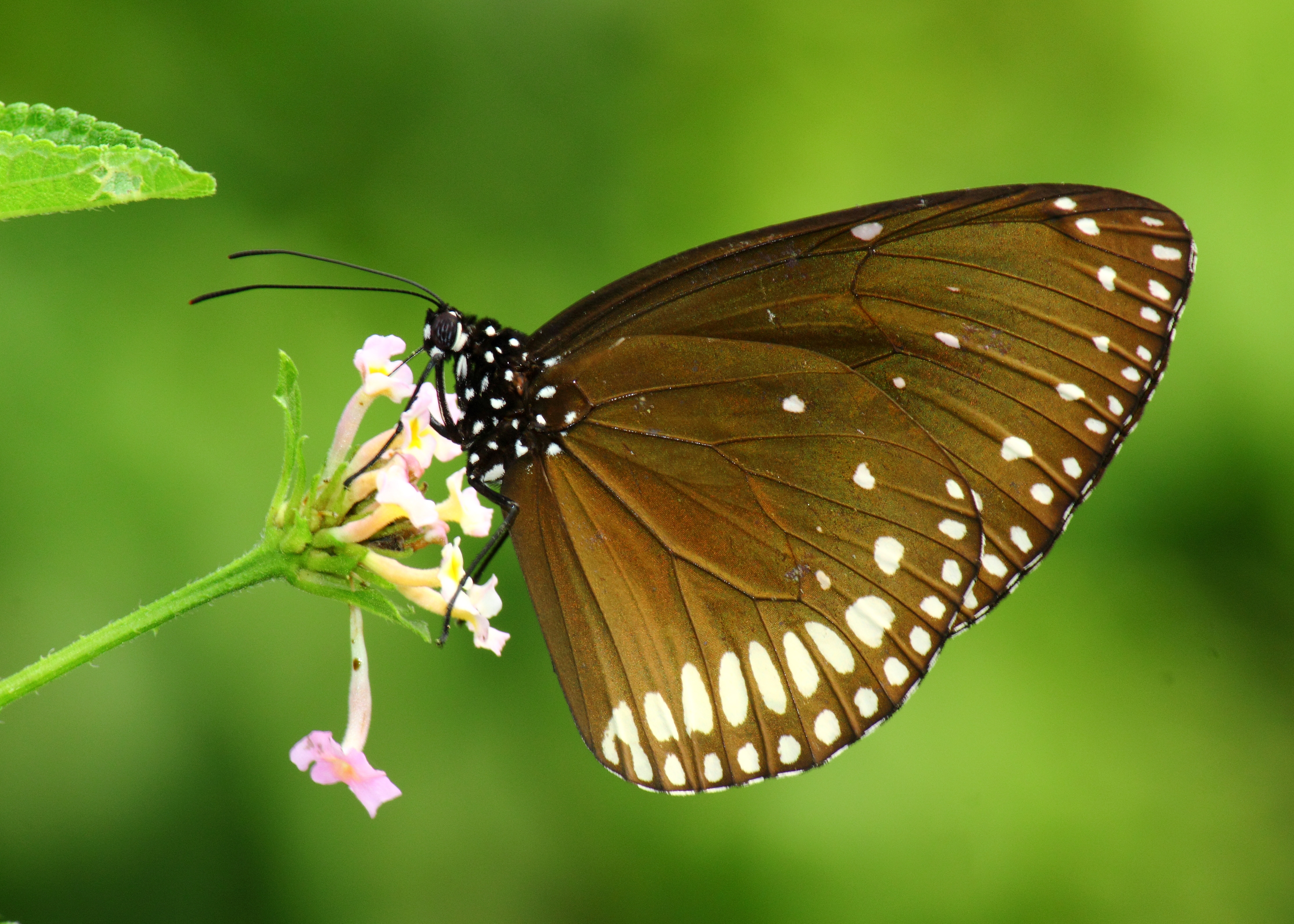
King crow, Euploea klugii

==== Euploeini ====
| Common name | Binomial name | Subspecies (in India) | Comments |
|---|---|---|---|
| Long-branded blue crow | Euploea algea | 1 | Schedule 2 |
| Andaman crow | Euploea andamanensis | 3 | Endemic |
| Common crow | Euploea core | 2 | |
| Spotted black crow | Euploea crameri | 4 | Schedule 1 |
| Striped black crow | Euploea doubledayi | 1 | |
| Blue-branded king crow | Euploea eunice | 1 | |
| King crow | Euploea klugii | 2 | |
| Spotted blue crow | Euploea midamus | 3 | Schedule 1, Schedule 2 |
| Plain blue crow | Euploea modesta | | |
| Striped blue crow | Euploea mulciber | 2 | |
| Great crow | Euploea phaenareta | 1 | |
| Magpie crow | Euploea radamanthus | 2 | |
| Nicobar crow | Euploea scherzeri | 3 | Endemic |
| Double-branded crow | Euploea sylvester | 3 | |
| Burmese tree nymph | Idea agamarschana | 1 | |
| Malabar tree nymph | Idea malabarica | 2 | Schedule 2, Endemic |

=== Charaxinae ===
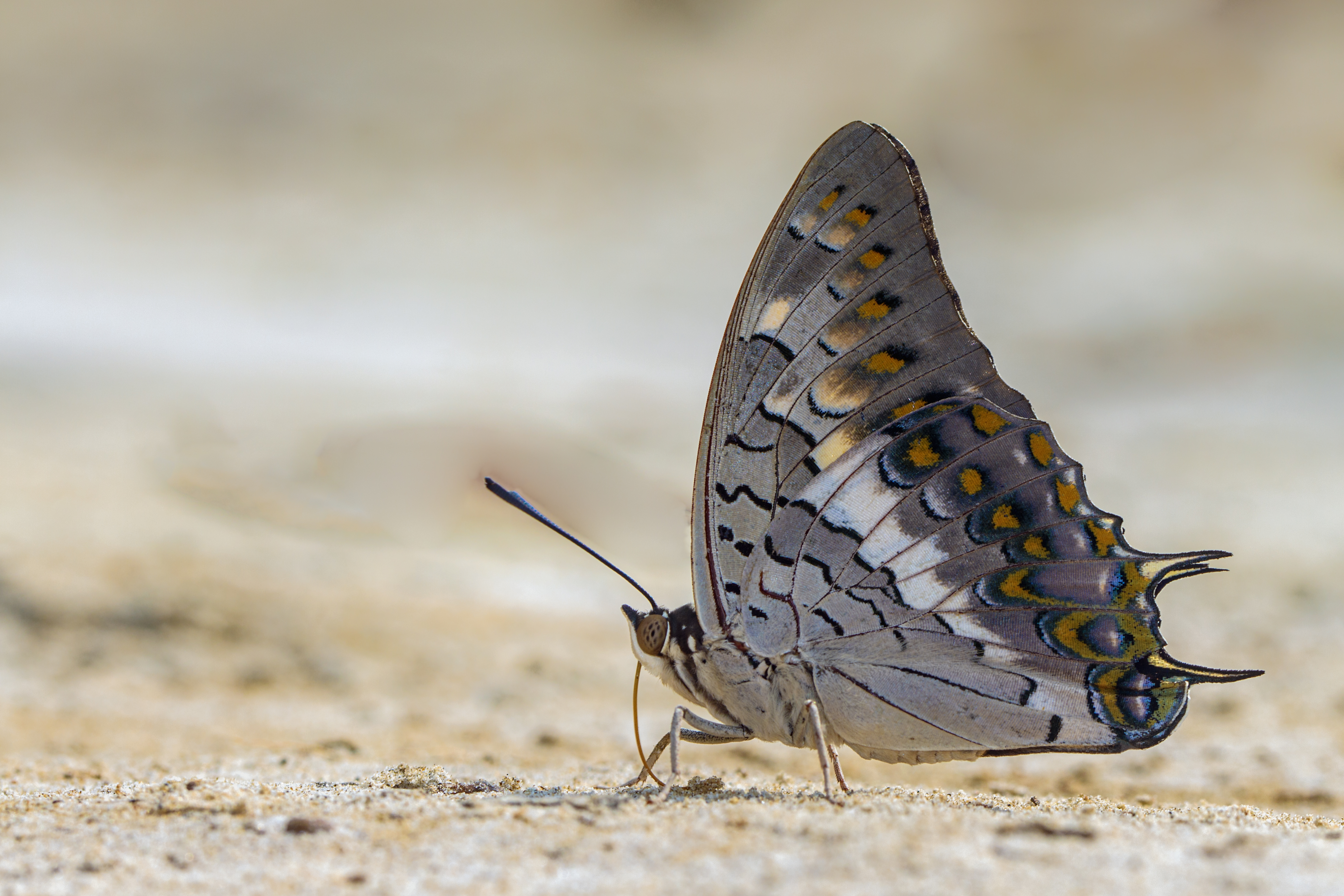
Black rajah, Eriboea solon

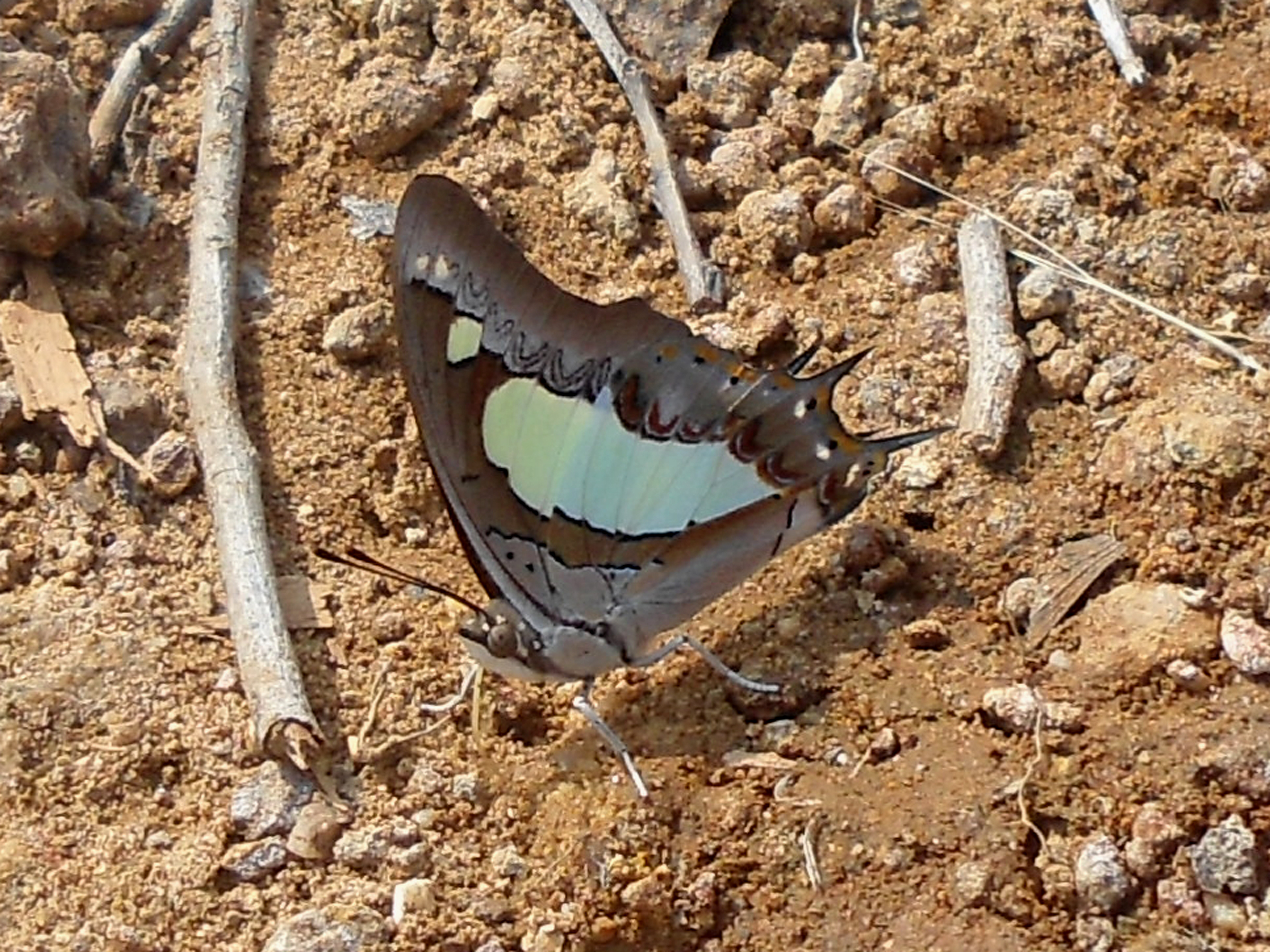
Anomalous nawab, Polyura agrarius

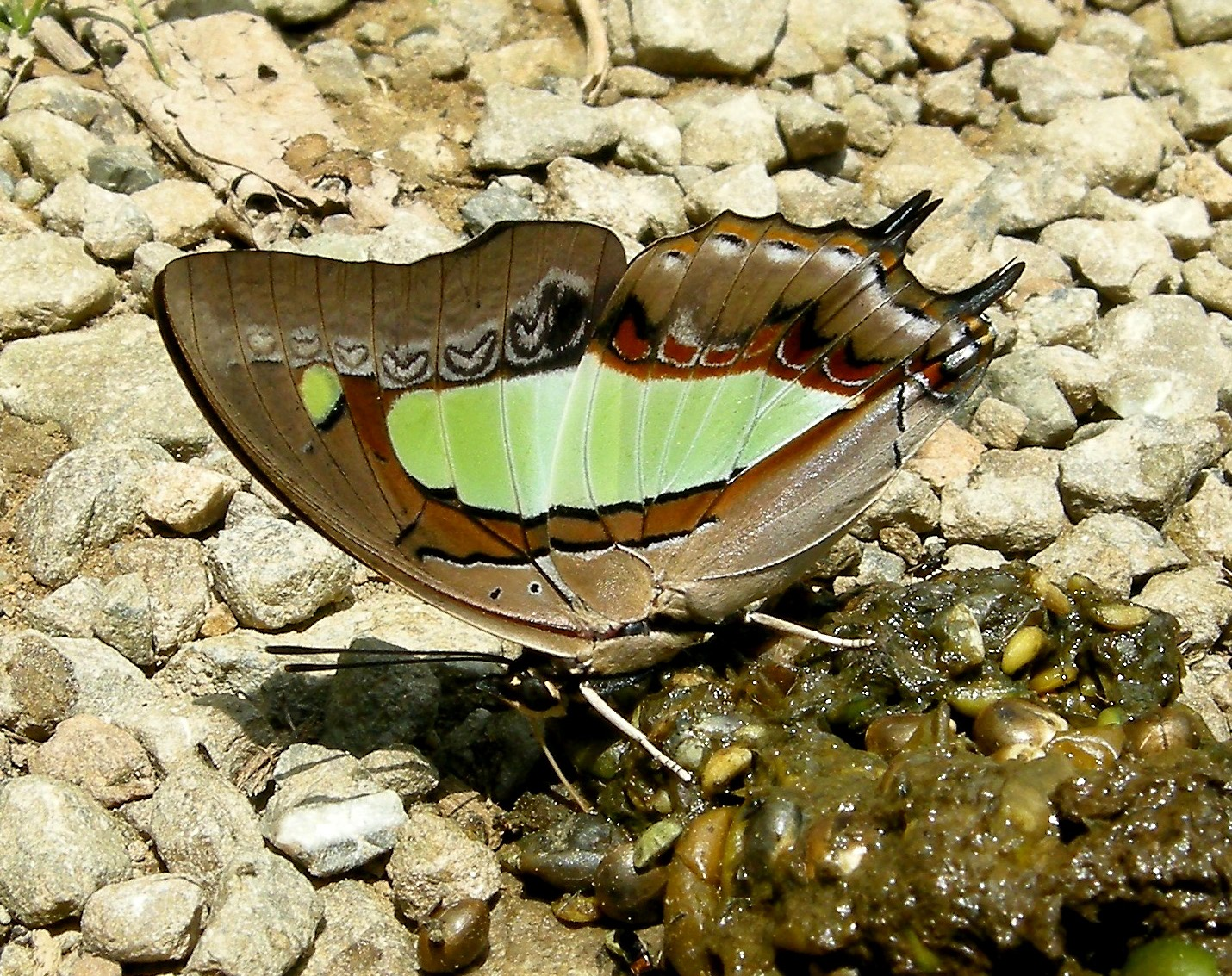
Common nawab, Polyura athamas

==== Charaxini ====
| Common name | Binomial name | Subspecies (in India) | Comments |
|---|---|---|---|
| Anomalous nawab | Polyura agrarius | 1 | |
| Pallid nawab | Polyura arja | | |
| Common nawab | Polyura athamas | 2 | Schedule 2 |
| Cryptic nawab | Polyura bharata | | |
| Jewelled nawab | Polyura delphis | 1 | Schedule 2 |
| Stately nawab | Polyura dolon | 4 | Schedule 2 |
| Great nawab | Polyura eudamippus | 1 | |
| Malayan nawab | Polyura moori | 1 | Schedule 1 |
| China nawab | Polyura narcaeus | 2 | Schedule 2 |
| Blue nawab | Polyura schreiber | 3 | Schedule 1 |
| Black rajah | Eriboea solon | 1 | Schedule 2 |
| Scarce tawny rajah | Charaxes aristogiton | 1 | Schedule 2 |
| Tawny rajah | Charaxes bernardus | 2 | Schedule 2 |
| Chestnut rajah | Charaxes durnfordi | 1 | Schedule 1 |
| Variegated rajah | Charaxes kahruba | | Schedule 2 |
| Yellow rajah | Charaxes marmax | 1 | Schedule 2 |
| Plain tawny rajah | Charaxes psaphon | 1 | |

==== Prothoini ====
| Common name | Binomial name | Subspecies (in India) | Comments |
|---|---|---|---|
| Blue begum | Prothoe franck | 1 | Schedule 1 |

=== Satyrinae ===
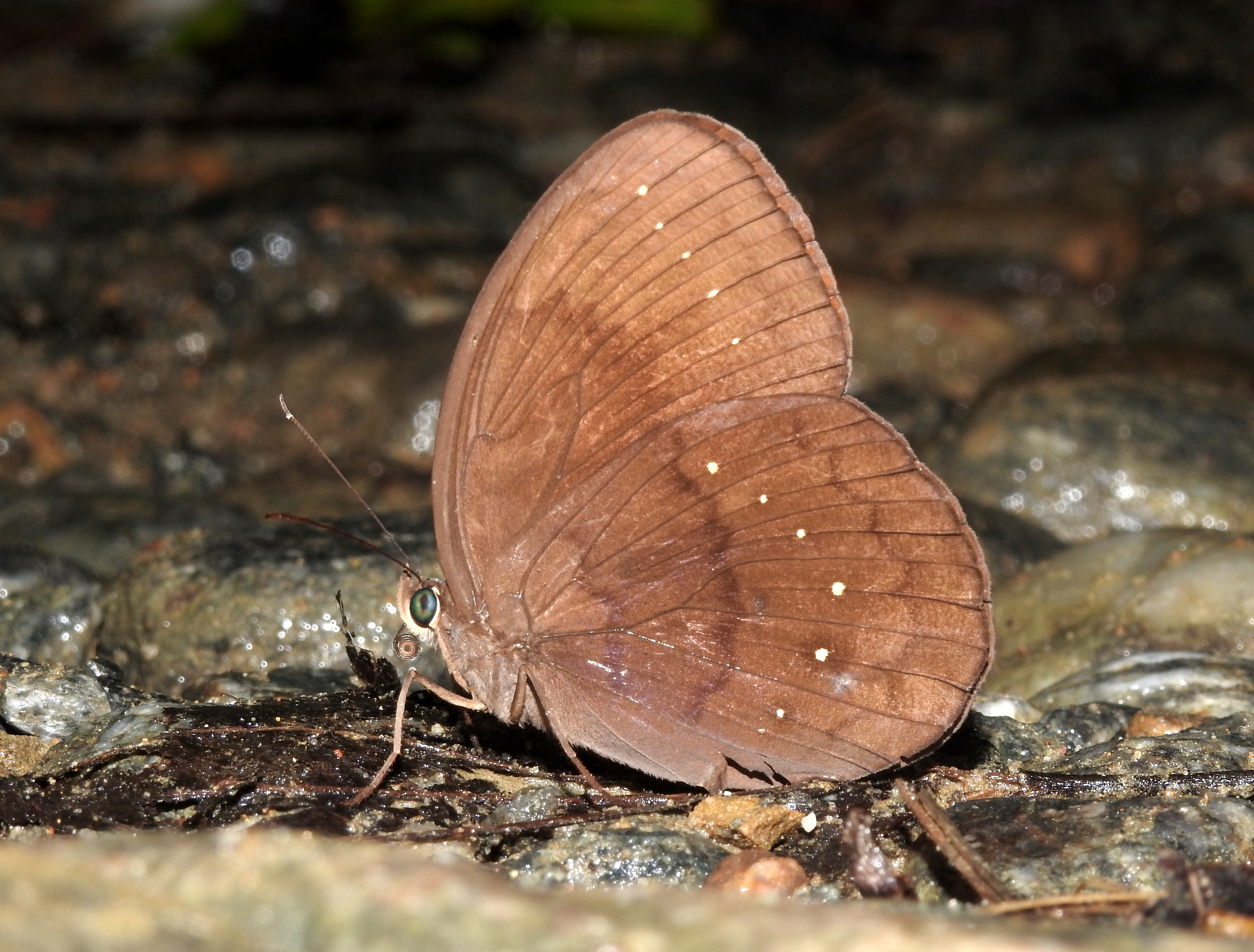
Common faun, Faunis canens

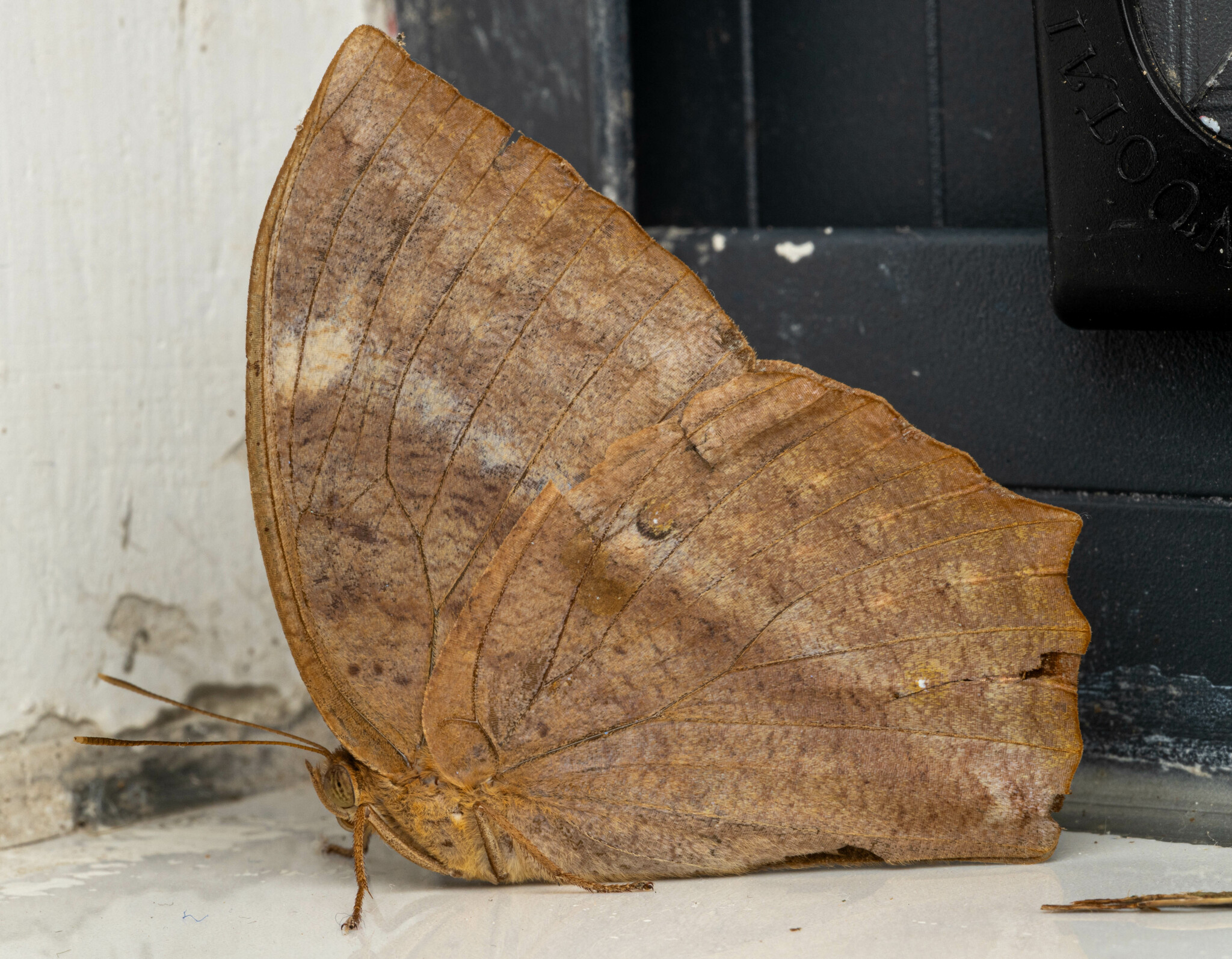
Common duffer, Discophora sondaica

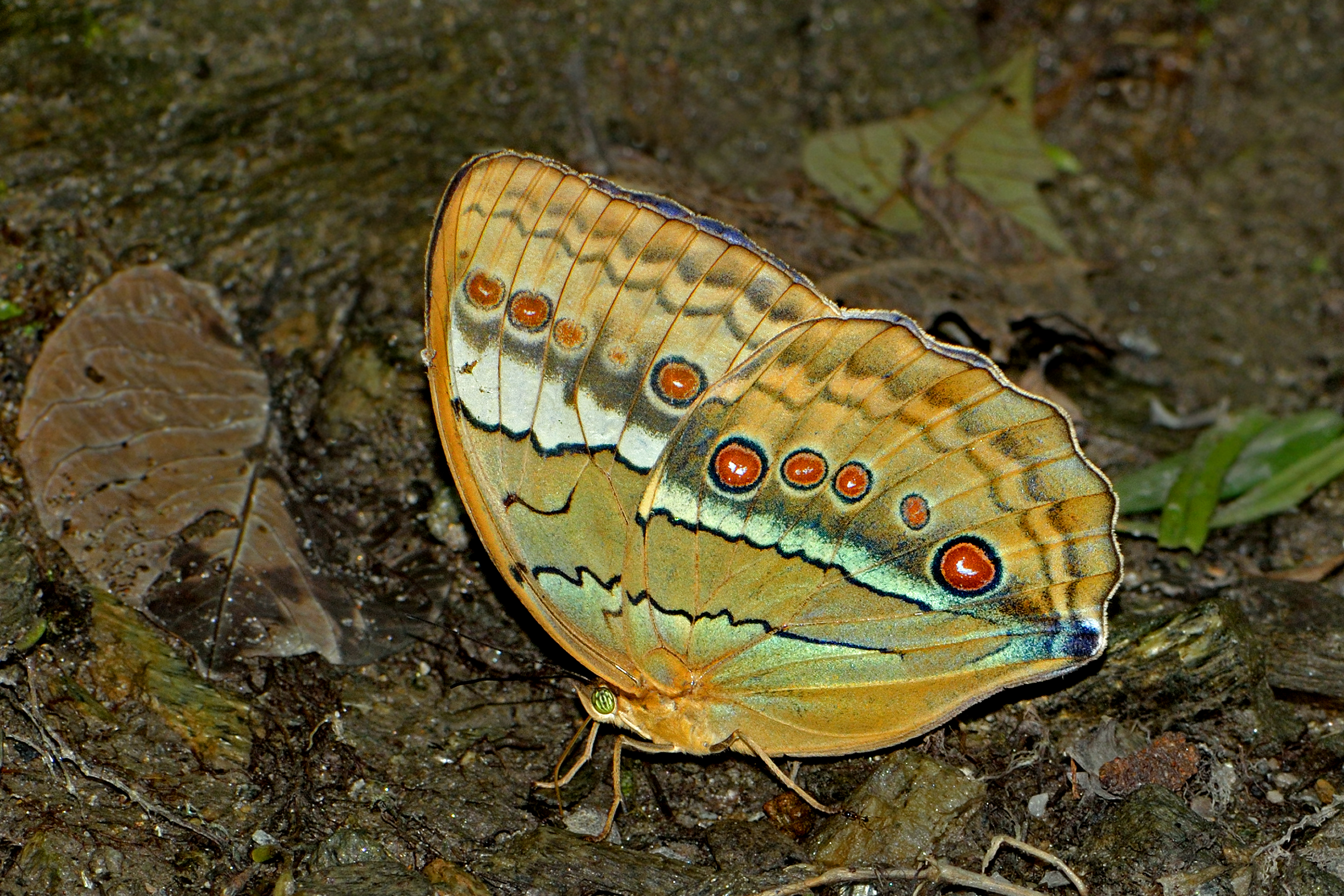
Northern junglequeen, Stichophthalma camadeva

==== Amathusiini ====
| Common name | Binomial name | Subspecies (in India) | Comments |
|---|---|---|---|
| Large faun | Faunis eumeus | 1 | |
| Common faun | Faunis canens | 1 | |
| Yellow dryad | Aemona amathusia | 1 | |
| Blue caliph | Enispe cycnus | 1 | |
| Red caliph | Enispe euthymius | 1 | |
| Malayan red caliph | Enispe duranius | 1 | |
| Banded duffer | Discophora deo | 1 | Schedule 1 |
| Southern duffer | Discophora lepida | 1 | |
| Common duffer | Discophora sondaica | 1 | Schedule 1 |
| Great duffer | Discophora timora | 2 | |
| Andaman palmking | Amathusia andamanensis | | Endemic |
| Travancore palmking | Amathusia travancorica | | Endemic |
| Koh-i-noor | Amathuxidia amythaon | 1 | |
| Jungleglory | Thaumantis diores | 1 | |
| Jungleking | Thauria lathyi | 1 | |
| Northern jungelqueen | Stichophthalma camadeva | 4 | Schedule 1 |
| Hainan junglequeen | Stichophthalma neumogeni | 1 | |
| Chocolate jungelqueen | Stichophthalma nourmahal | 1 | |
| Manipur junglequeen | Stichophthalma sparta | 2 | |

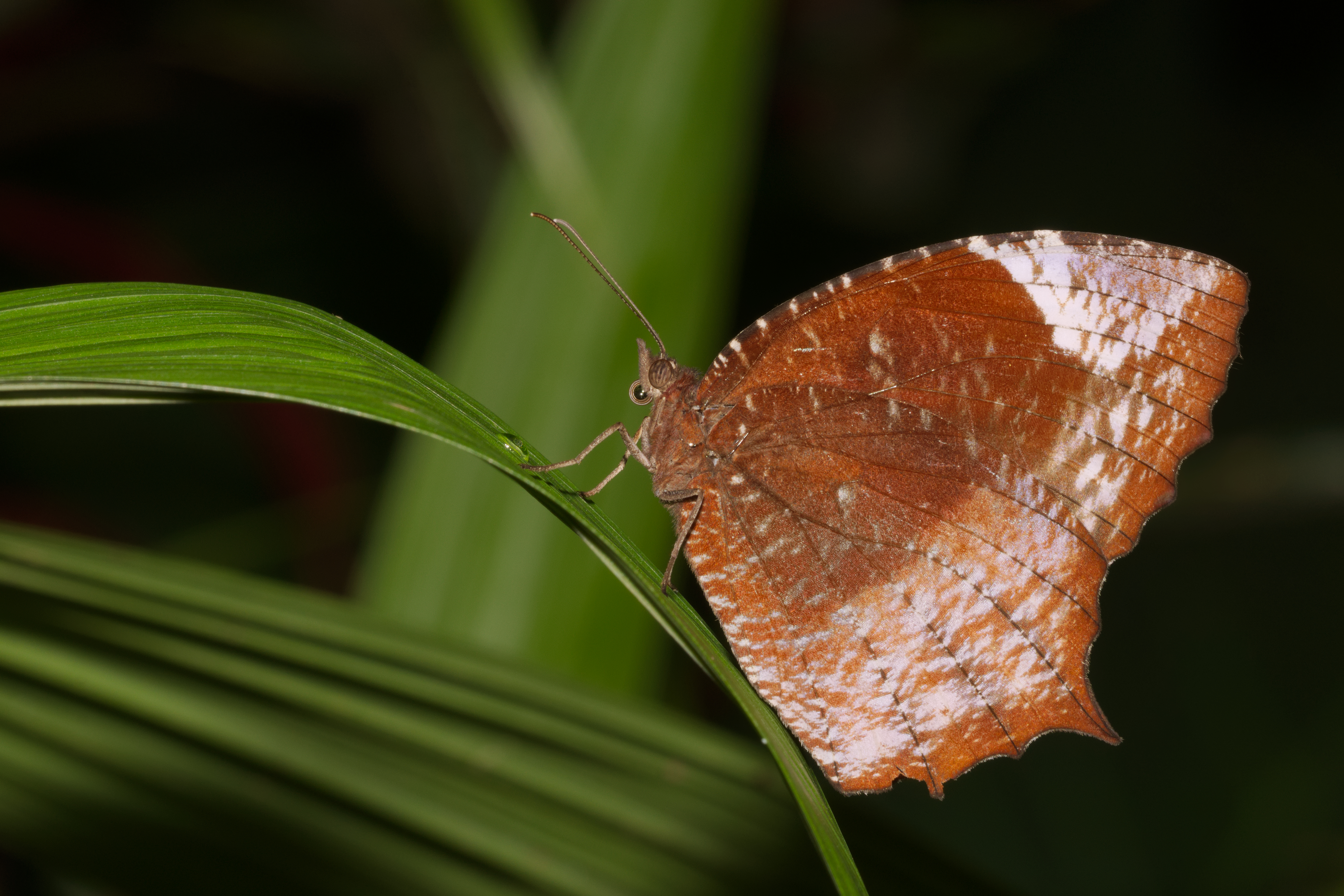
Tailed palmfly, Elymnias caudata

==== Elymniini ====
| Common name | Binomial name | Subspecies (in India) | Comments |
|---|---|---|---|
| Tailed palmfly | Elymnias caudata | | Endemic |
| Common palmfly | Elymnias hypermnestra | 2 | |
| Spotted palmfly | Elymnias malelas | | Schedule 2 |
| Tiger palmfly | Elymnias nesaea | 1 | |
| Chestnut palmfly | Elymnias obnubila | | |
| Tawny palmfly | Elymnias panthera | 1 | |
| Blue-striped palmfly | Elymnias patna | 1 | |
| Peal's palmfly | Elymnias peali | | Schedule 1 |
| Pointed palmfly | Elymnias penanga | 1 | Schedule 1 |
| Jezabel palmfly | Elymnias vasudeva | | Schedule 2 |

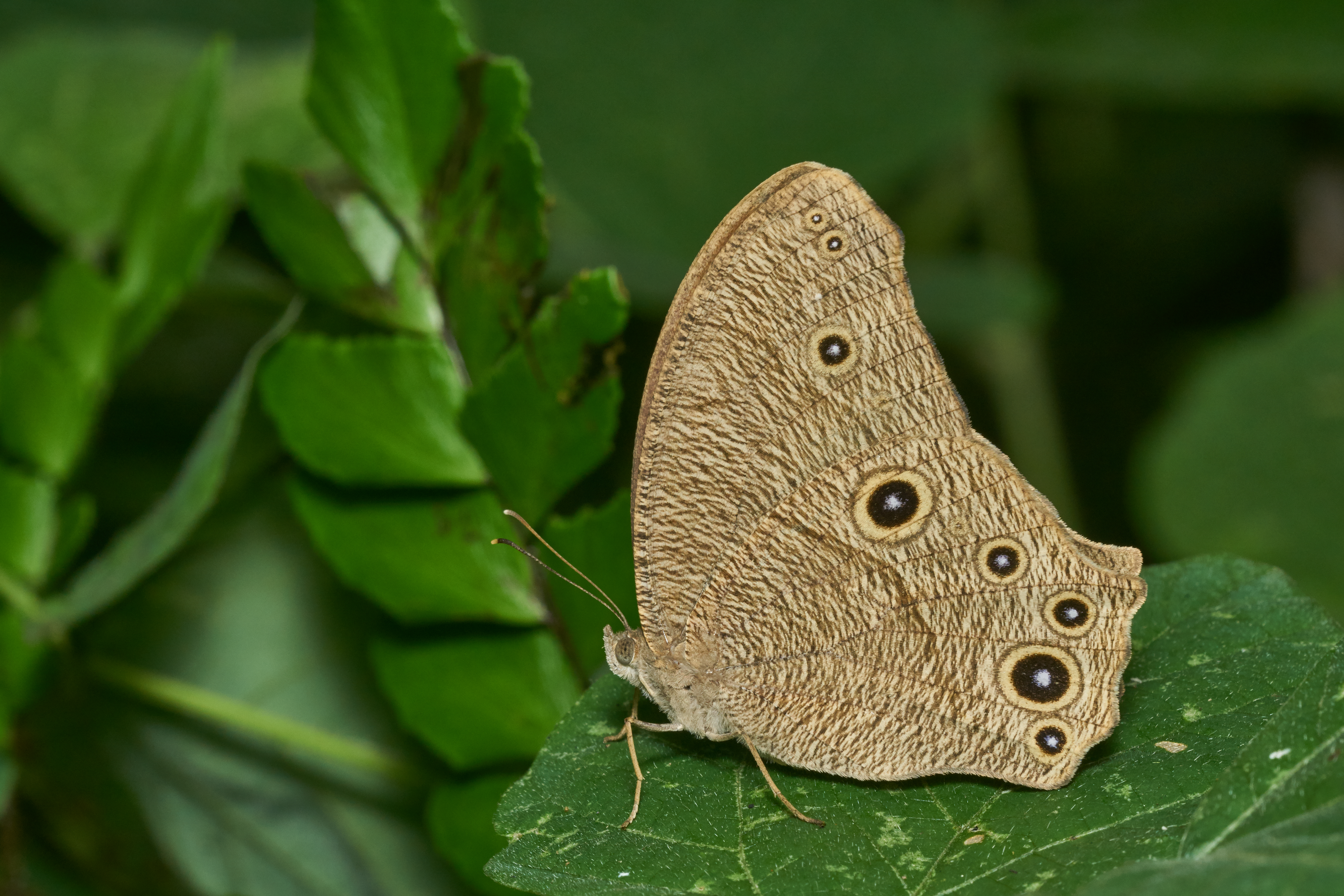
Common evening brown, Melanitis leda

==== Melanitini ====
| Common name | Binomial name | Subspecies (in India) | Comments |
|---|---|---|---|
| Common evening brown | Melanitis leda | 1 | |
| Dark evening brown | Melanitis phedima | 4 | |
| Great evening brown | Melanitis zitenius | 4 | Schedule 2 |
| Scarce evening brown | Cyllogenes janetae | 2 | Schedule 2 |
| Branded evening brown | Cyllogenes suradeva | | Schedule 2 |
| Travancore evening brown | Parantirrhoea marshalli | | Schedule 2, Endemic |

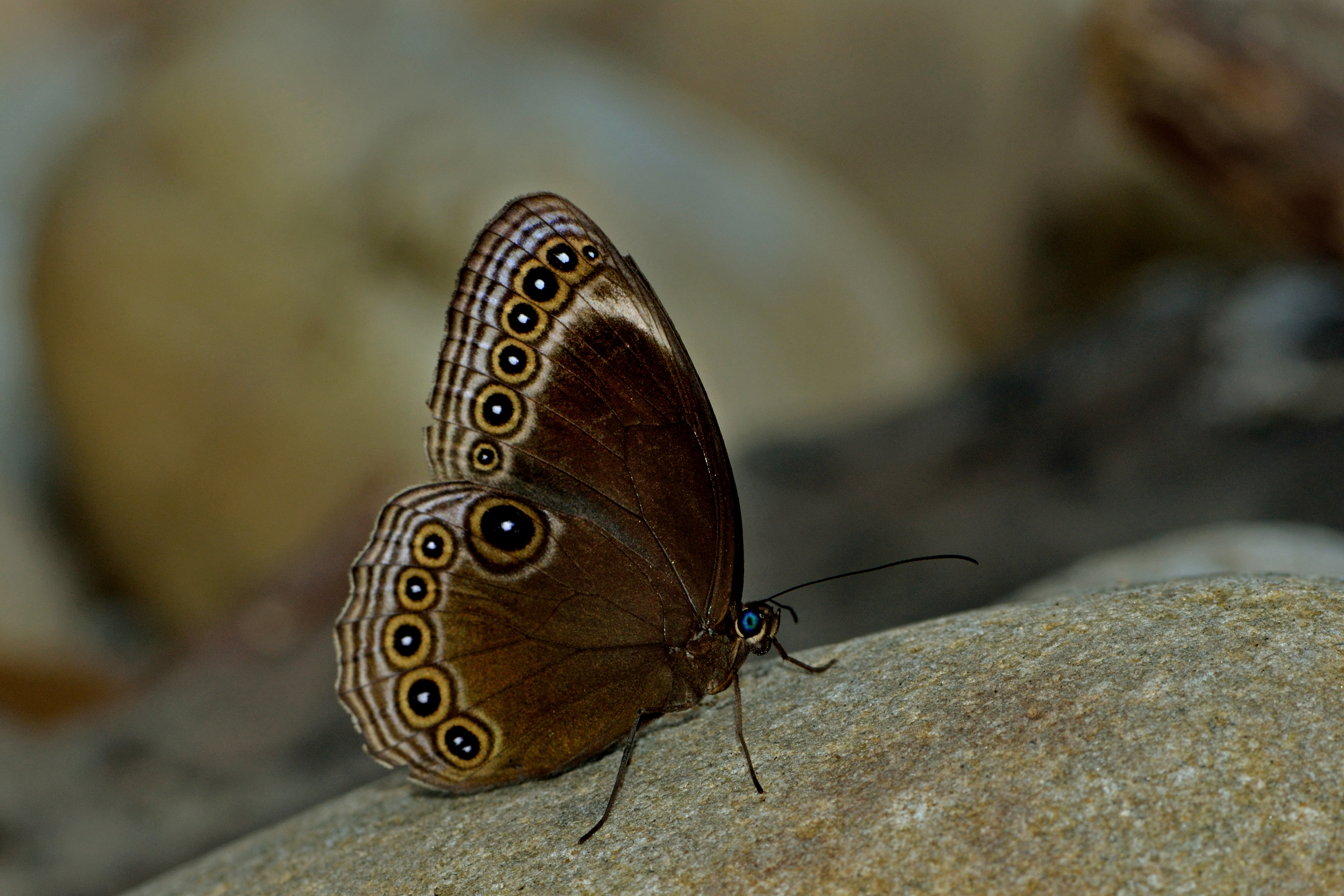
Dusky diadem, Ethope himachala

==== Zetherini ====
| Common name | Binomial name | Subspecies (in India) | Comments |
|---|---|---|---|
| Yellow kaiser | Penthema lisarda | 1 | Schedule 2 |
| Dusky diadem | Ethope himachala | | |
| Yellow owl | Neorina hilda | | Schedule 2 |
| White owl | Neorina patria | 1 | Schedule 2 |

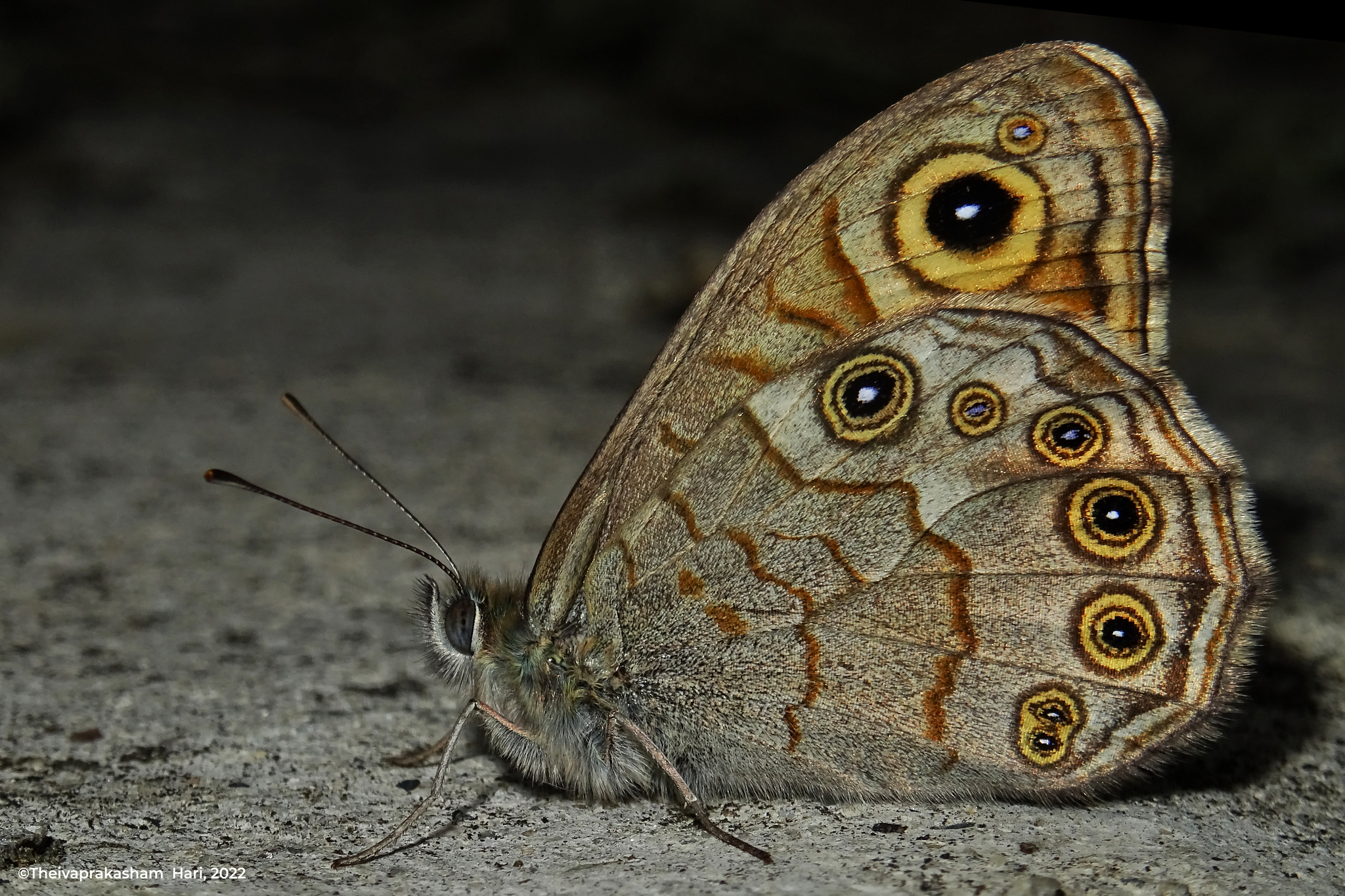
Common wall, Lasiommata schakra

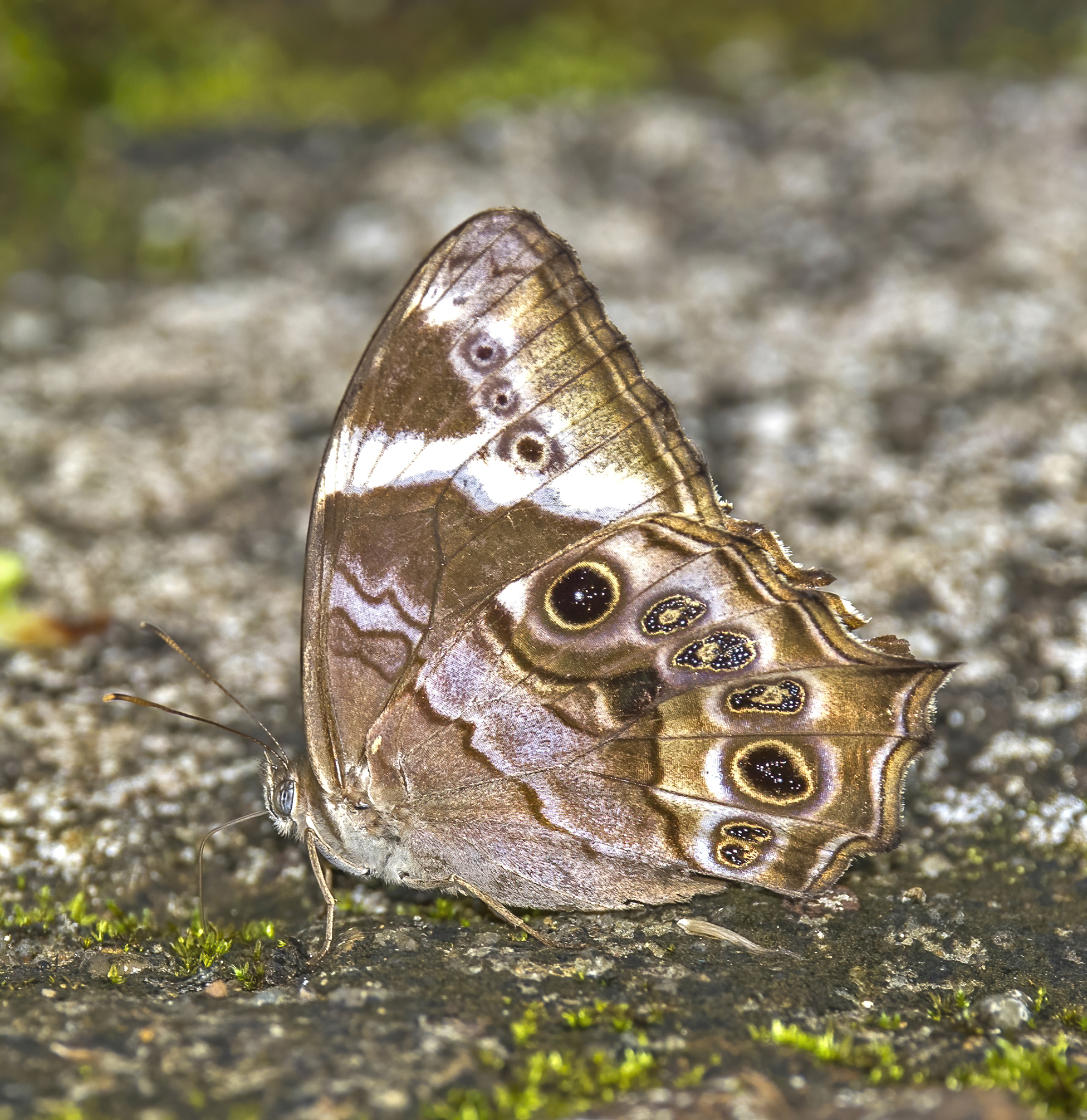
Tamil treebrown, Lethe drypetis

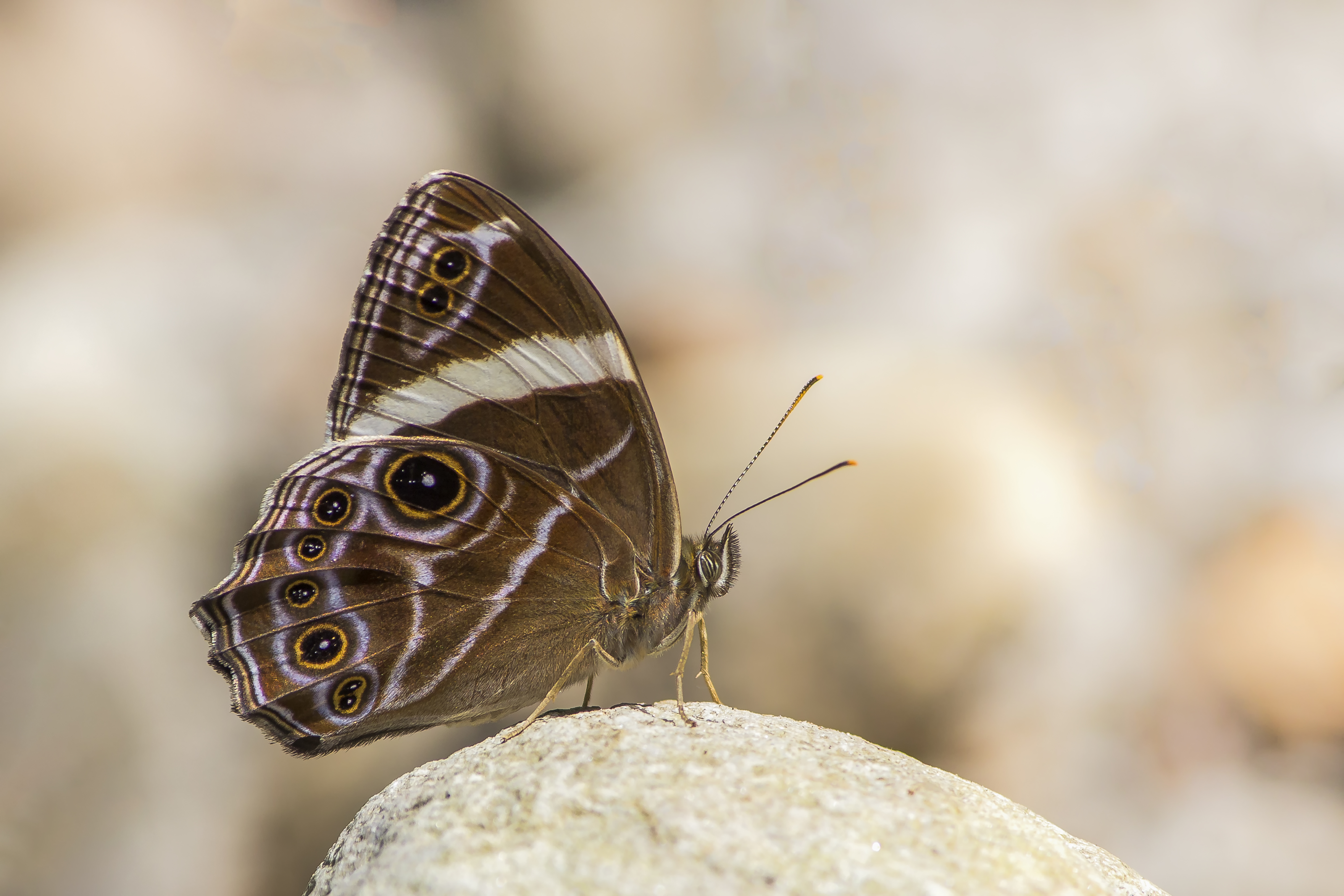
Bamboo treebrown, Lethe europa

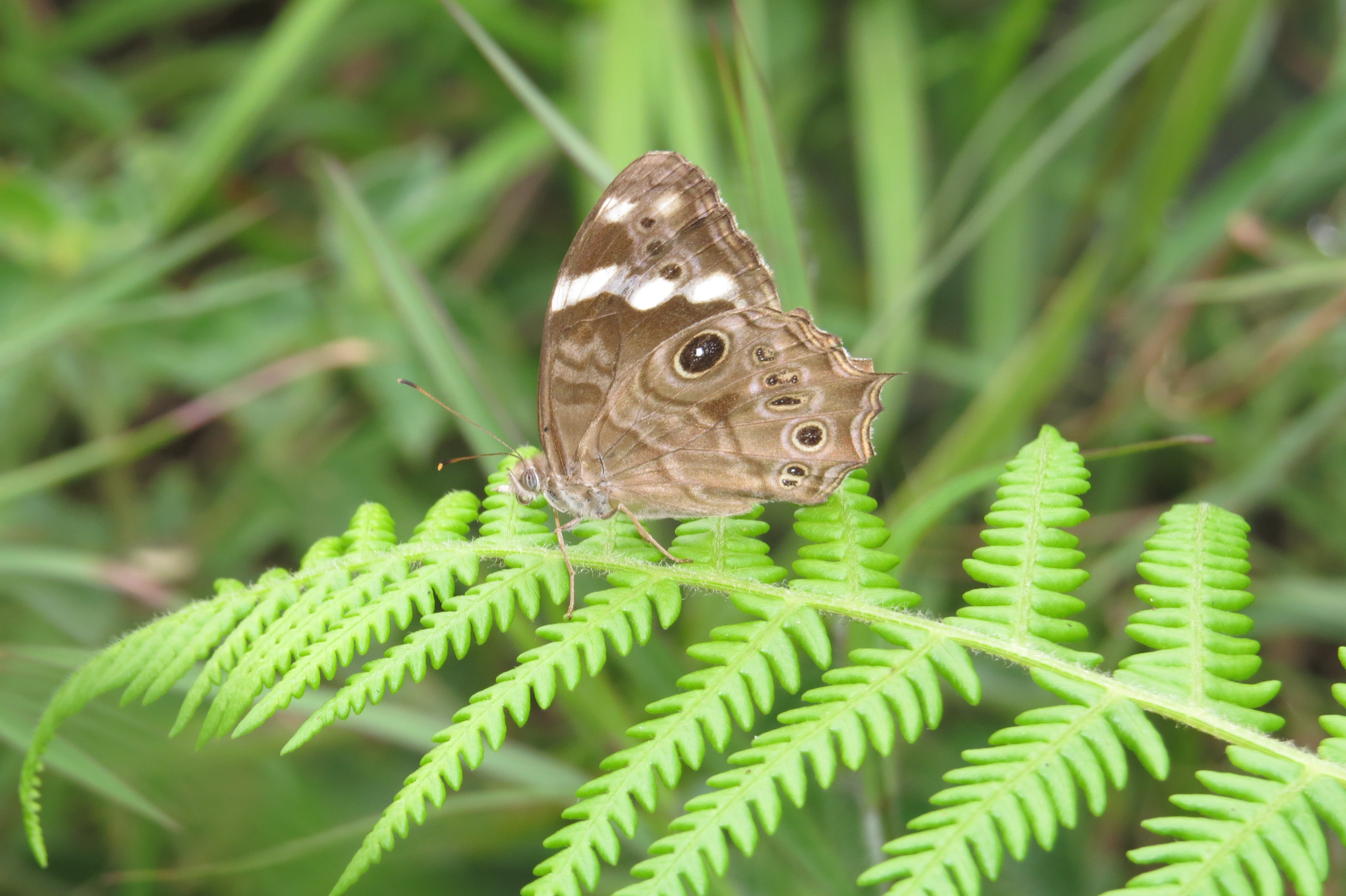
Common treebrown, Lethe rohria

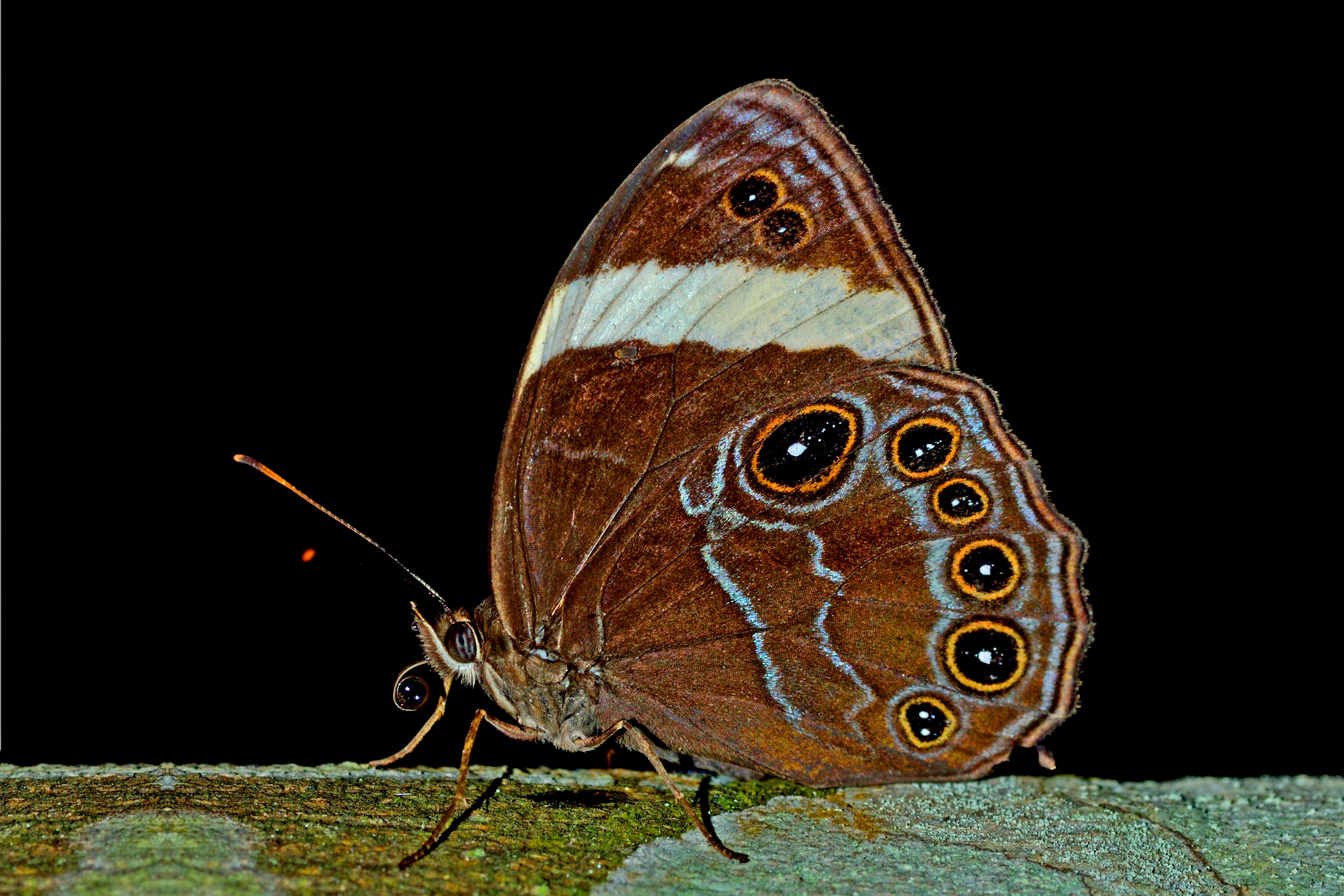
Straight-banded treebrown, Lethe verma

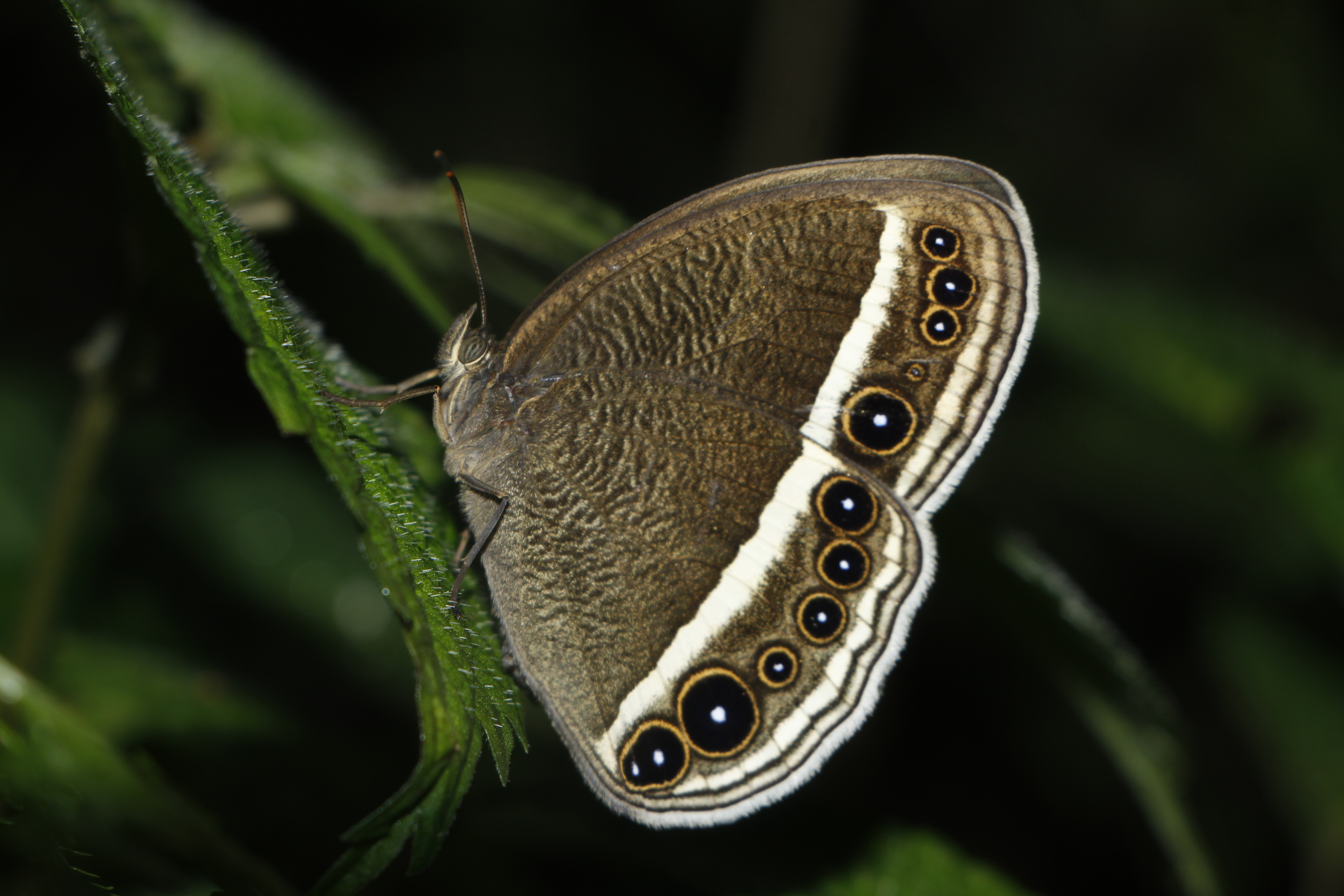
White-edged bushbrown, Telinga mestra

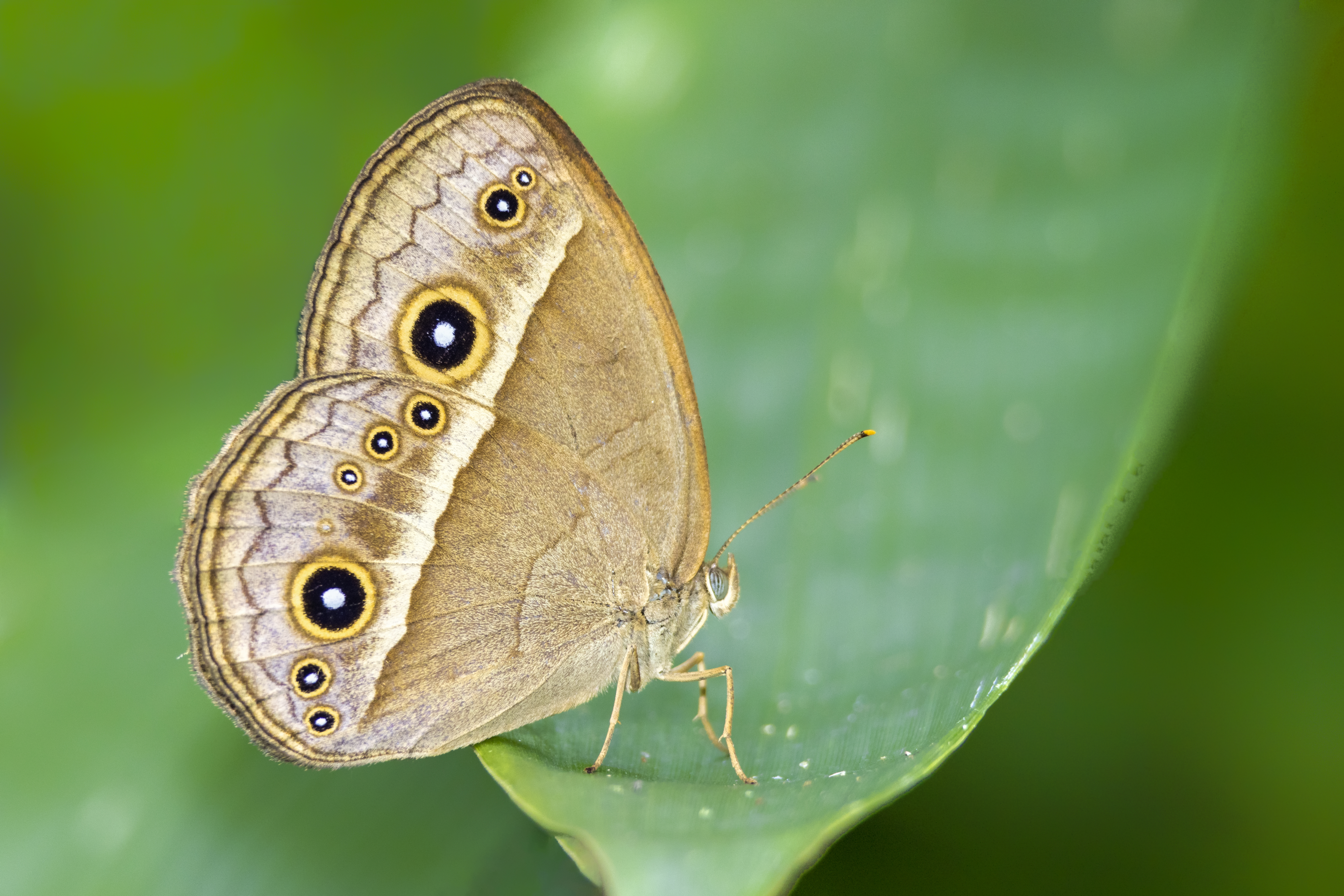
Chinese bushbrown, Mycalesis gotama

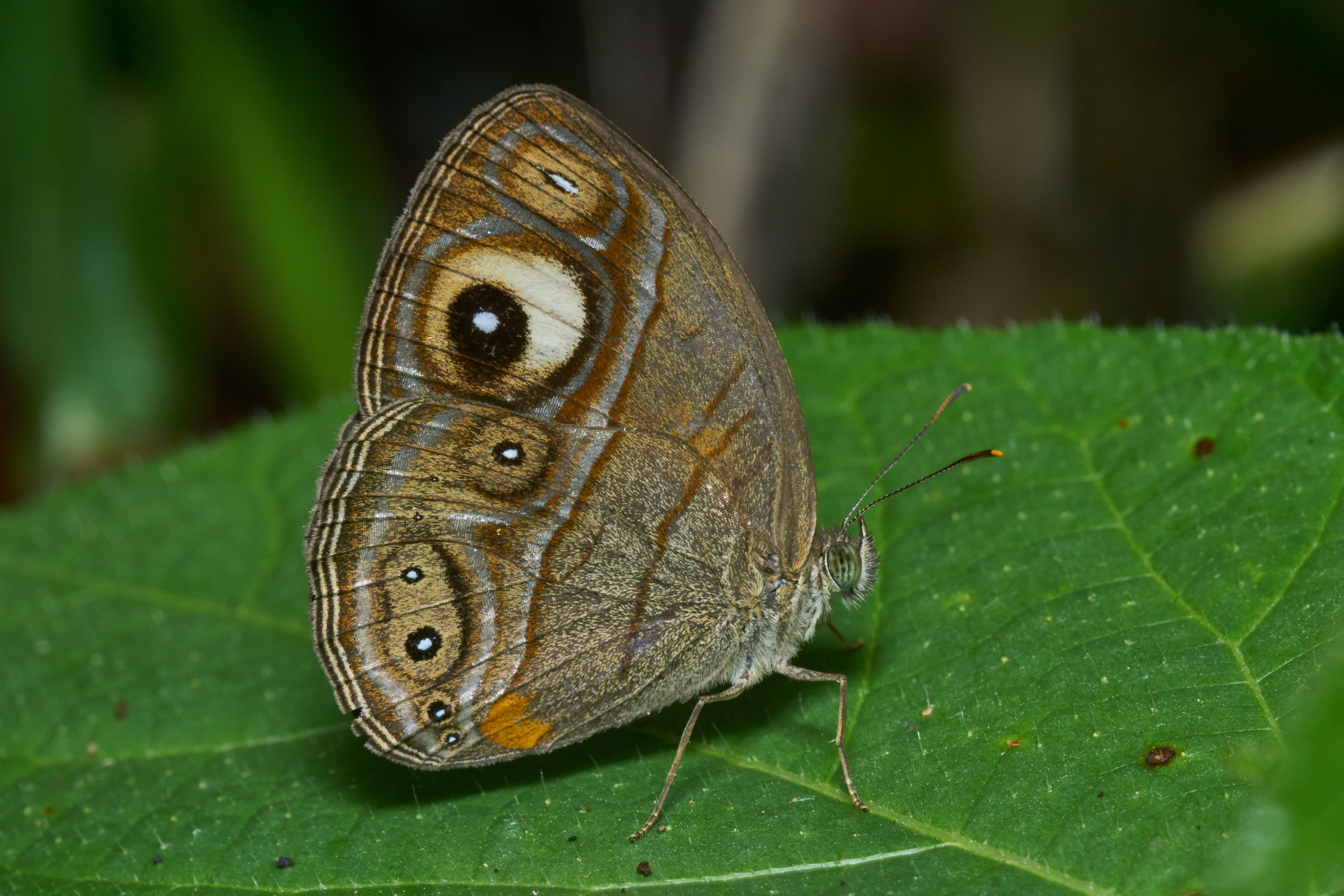
Gladeye bushbrown, Mycalesis patnia

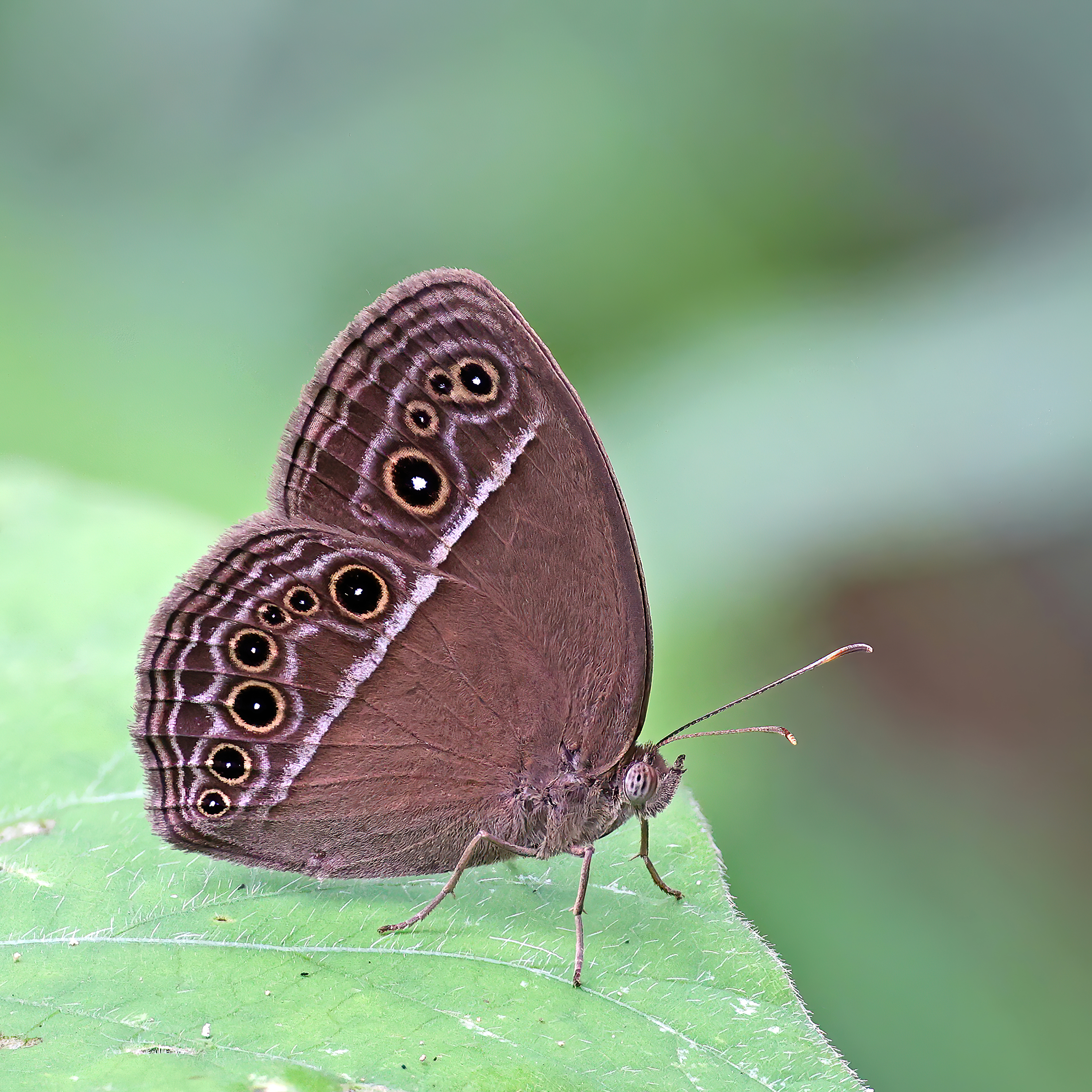
Common bushbrown, Mycalesis perseus

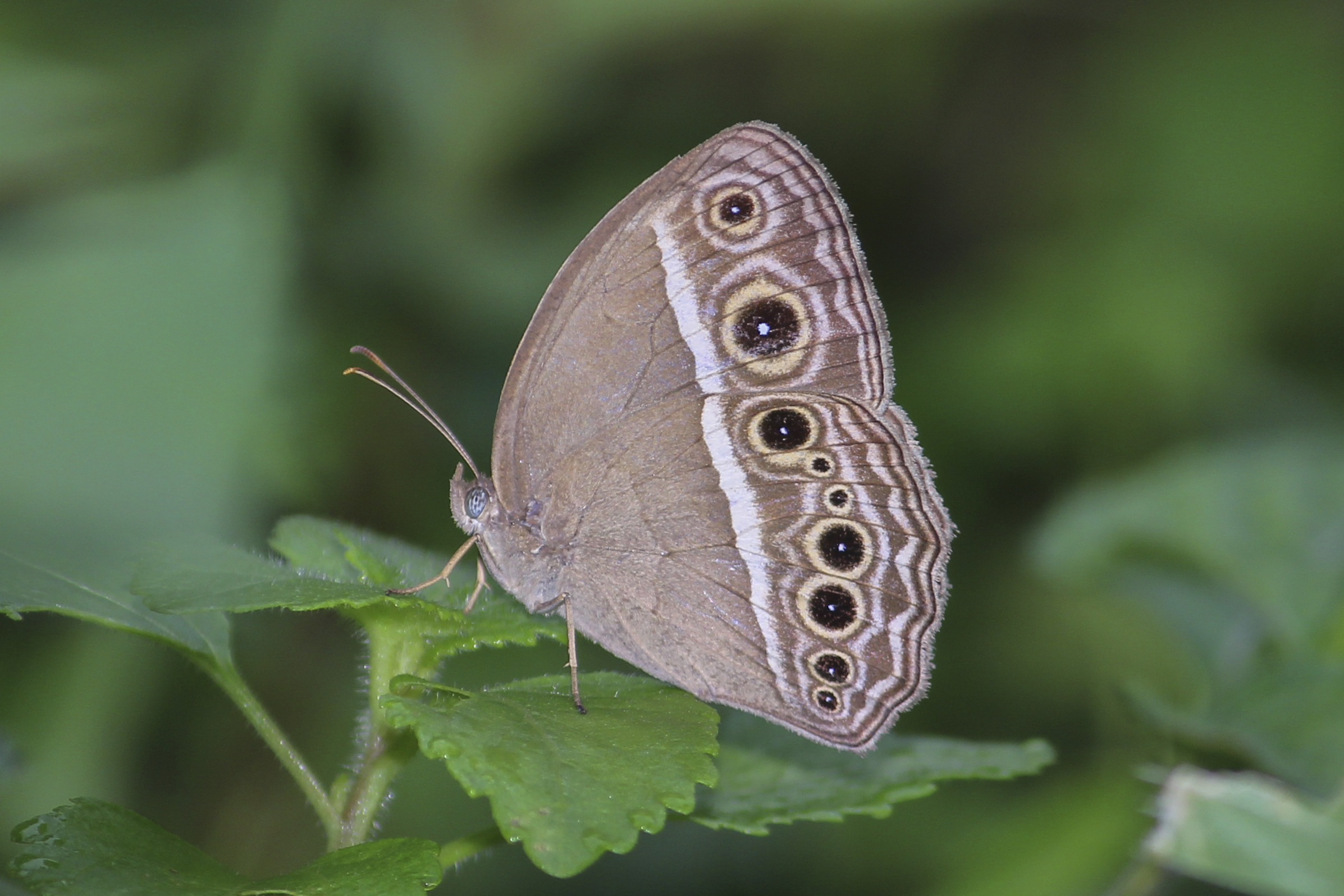
Dark-brand bushbrown, Mycalesis mineus

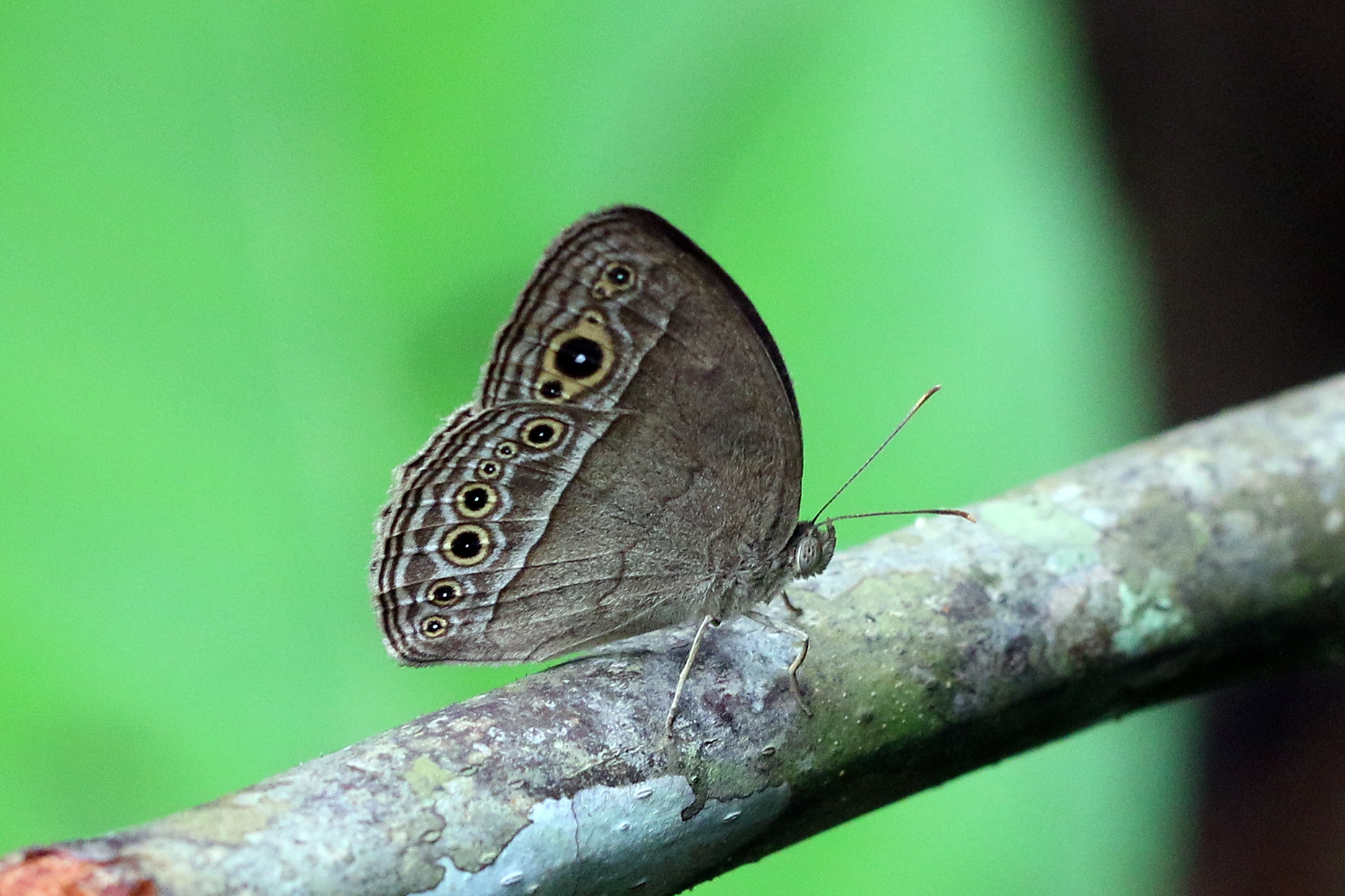
Long-brand bushbrown, Mycalesis visala

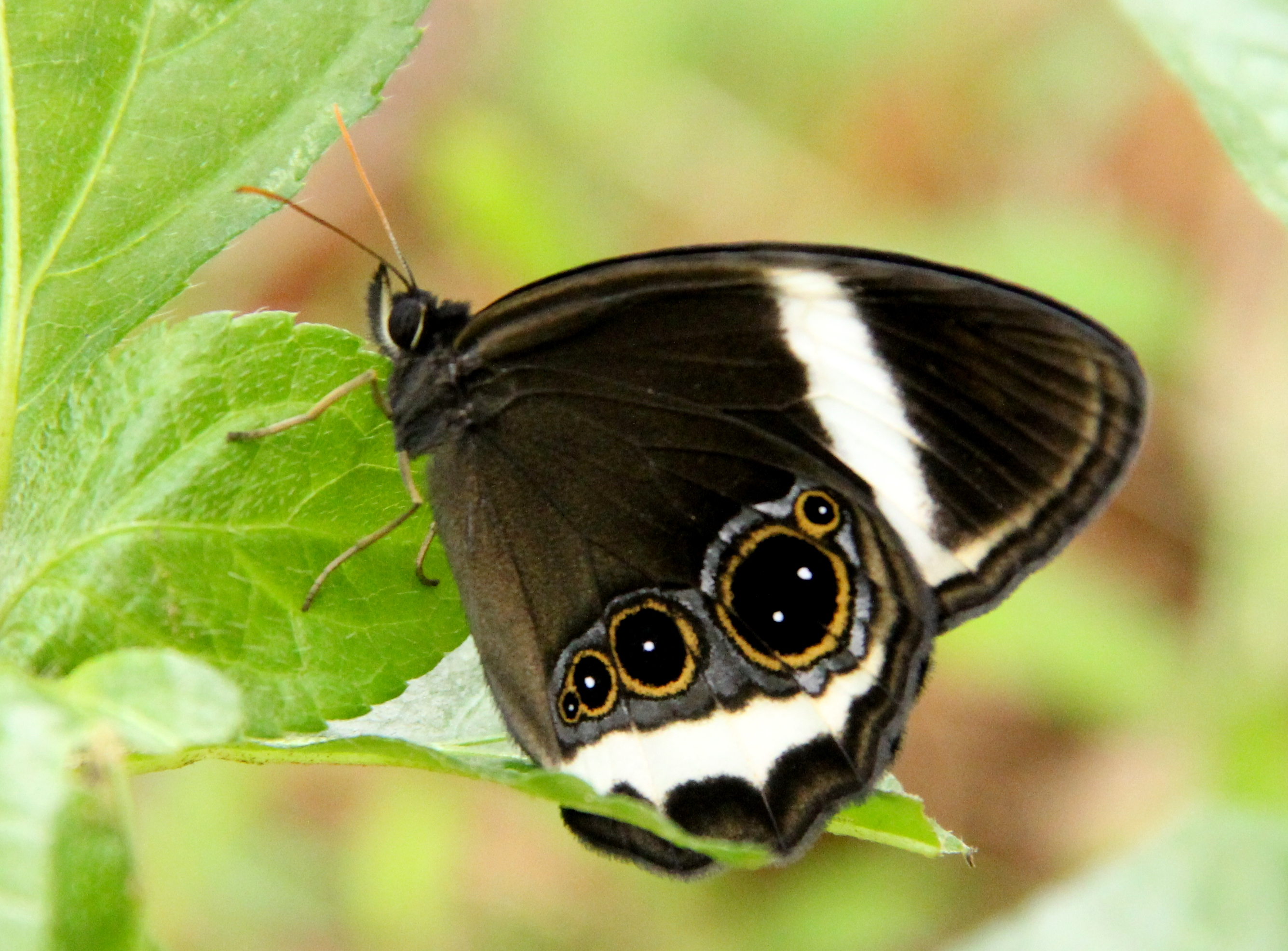
Tamil catseye, Zipaetis saitis

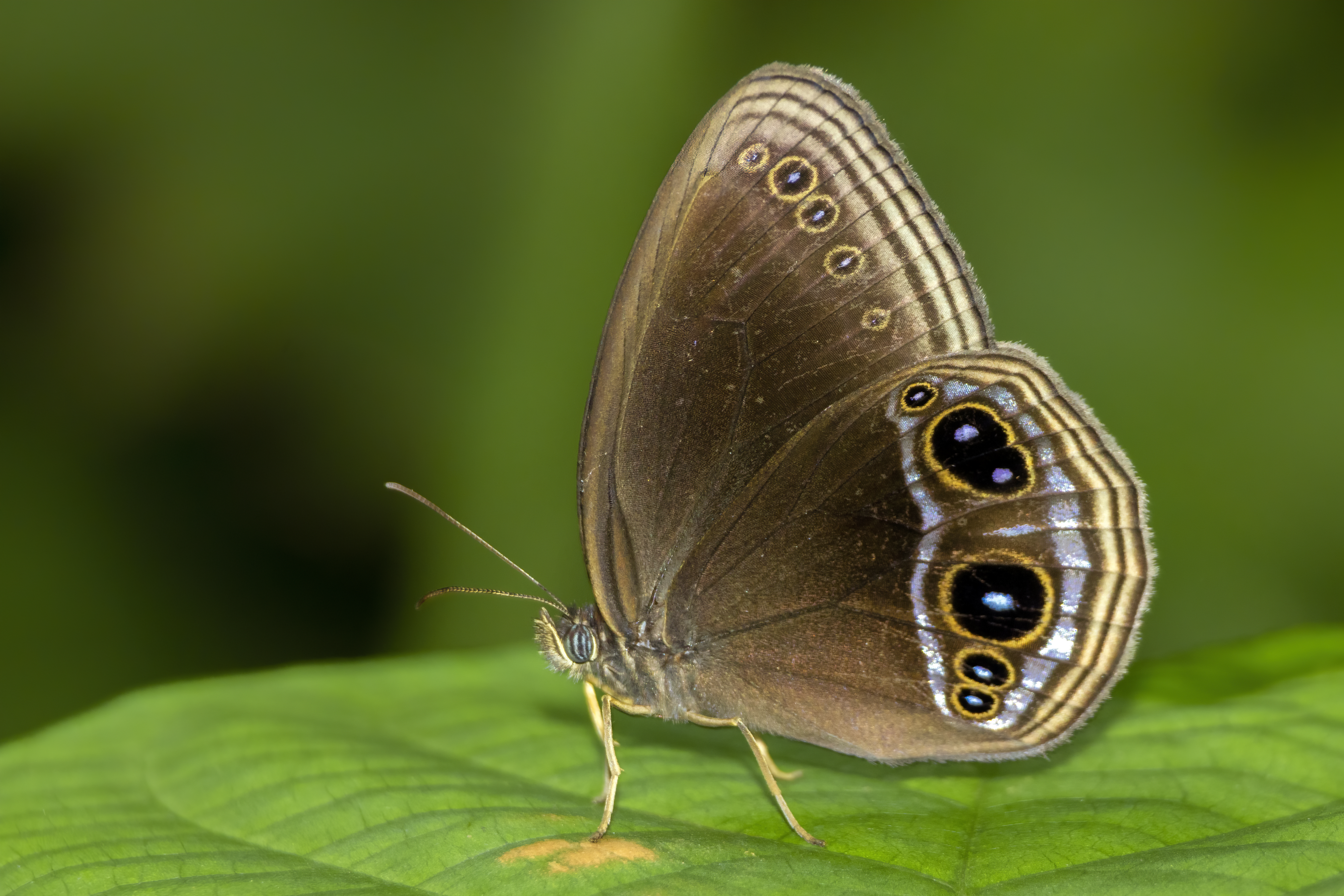
Dark catseye, Zipaetis scylax

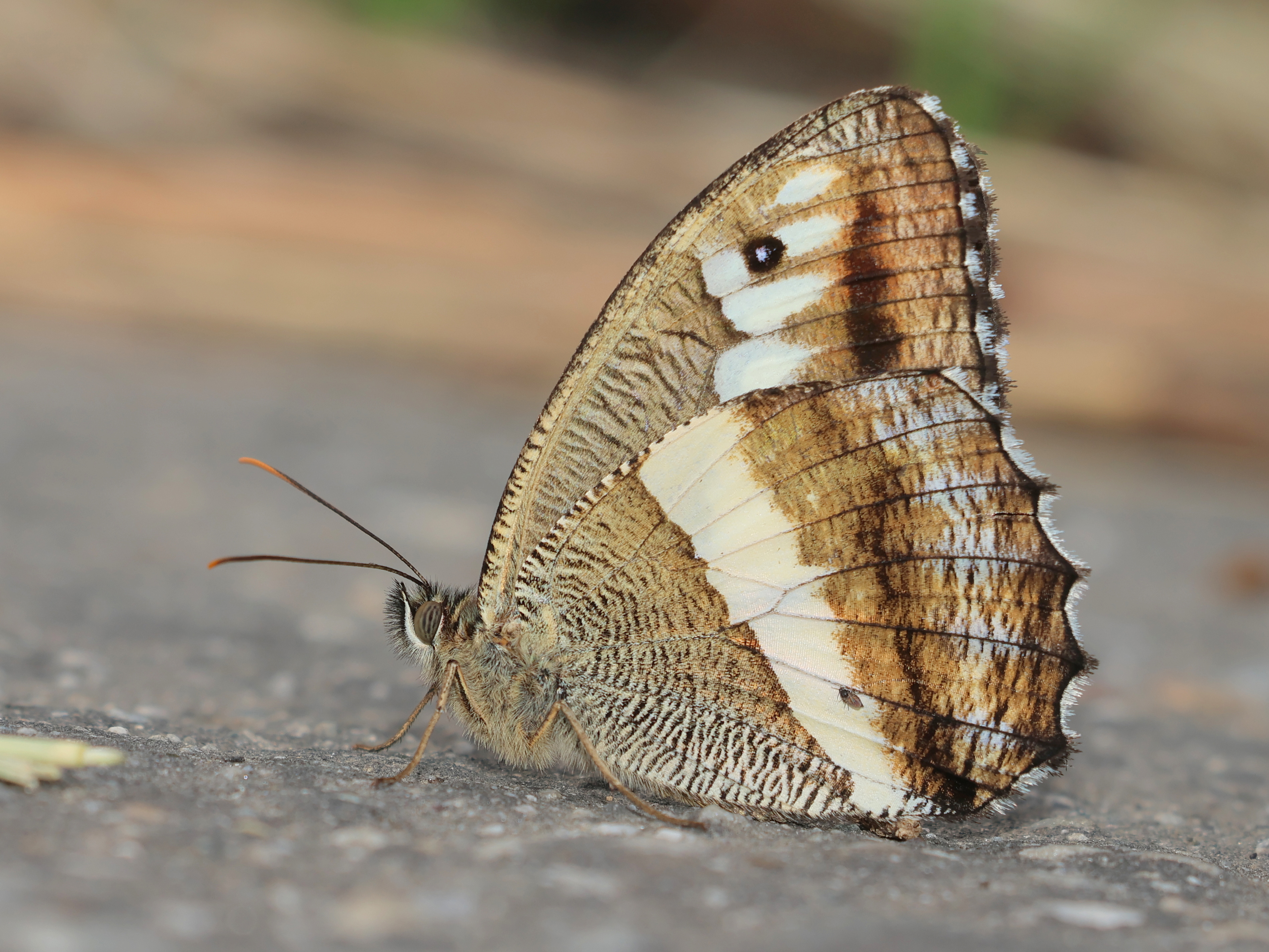
Common satyr, Aulocera saraswati

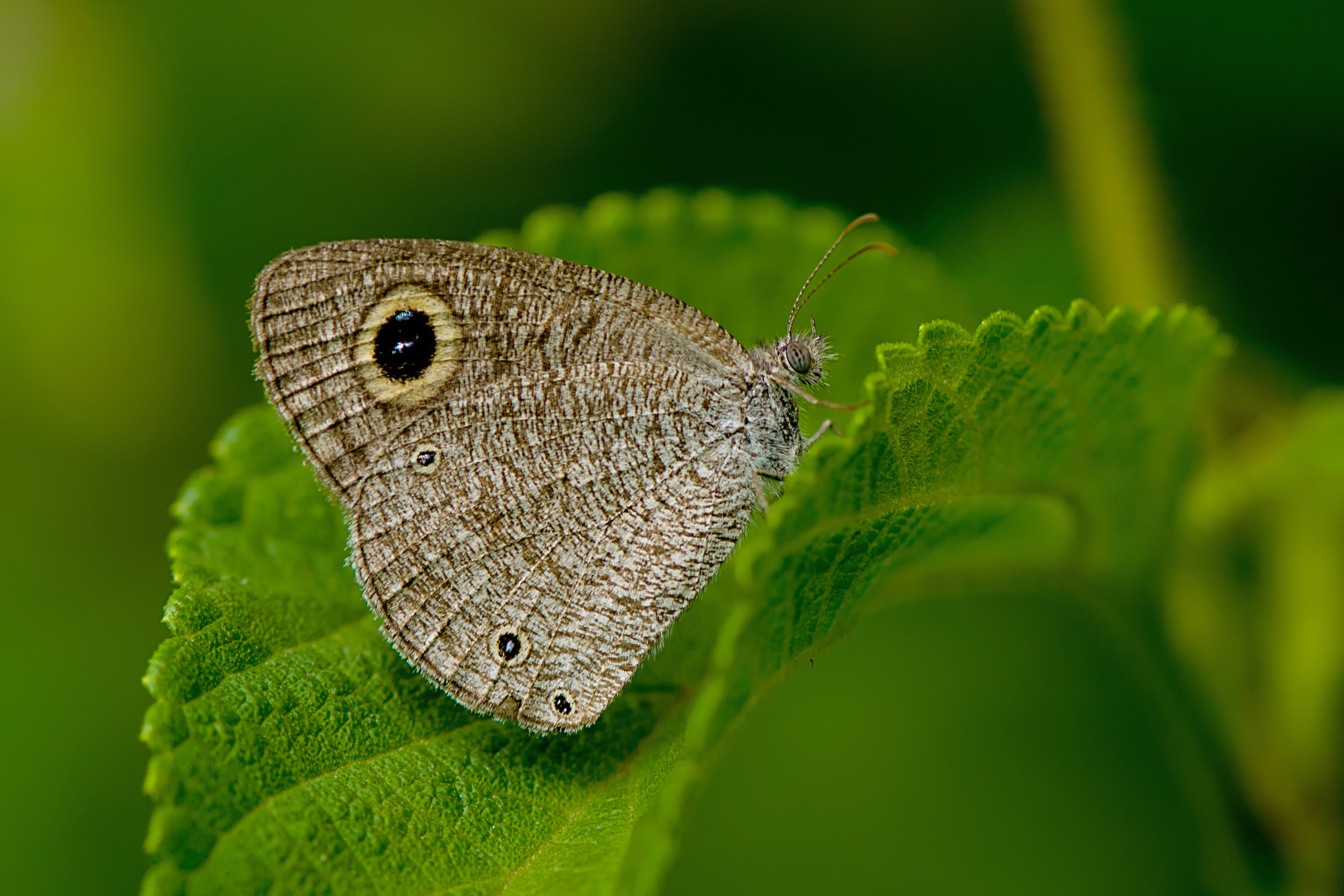
Common threering, Ypthima asterope

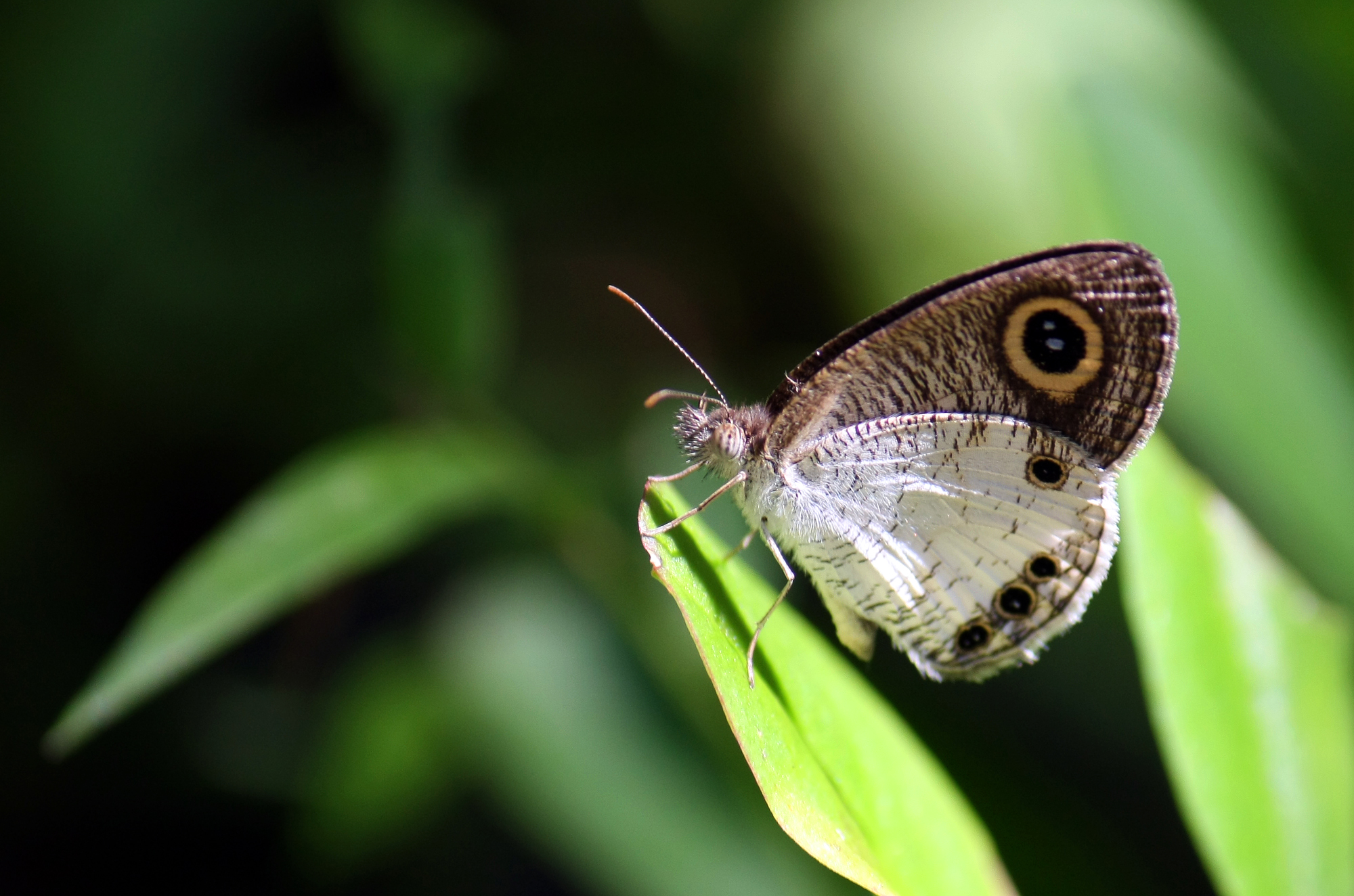
White fourring, Ypthima ceylonica

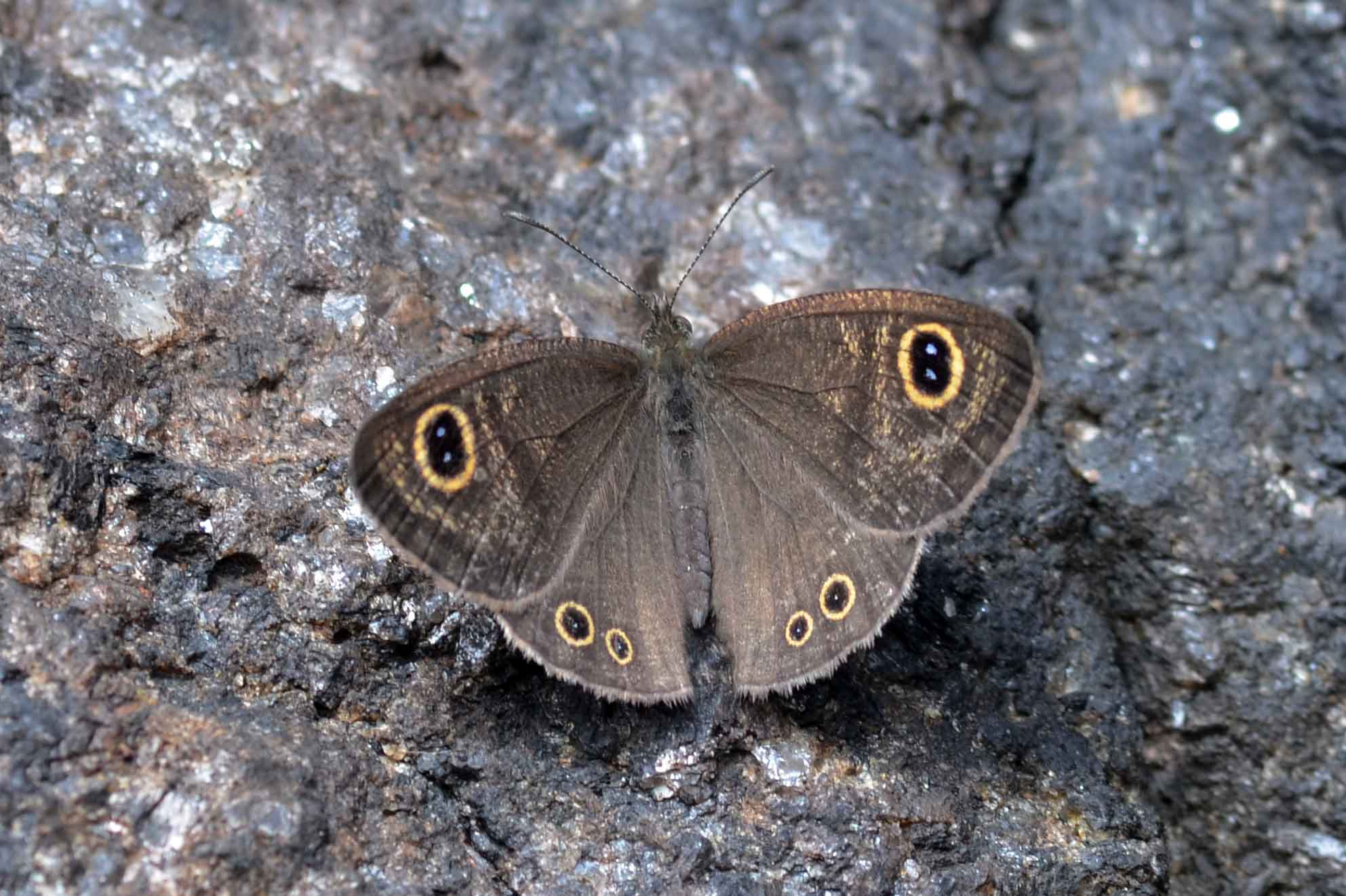
Nilgiri fourring, Ypthima chenu

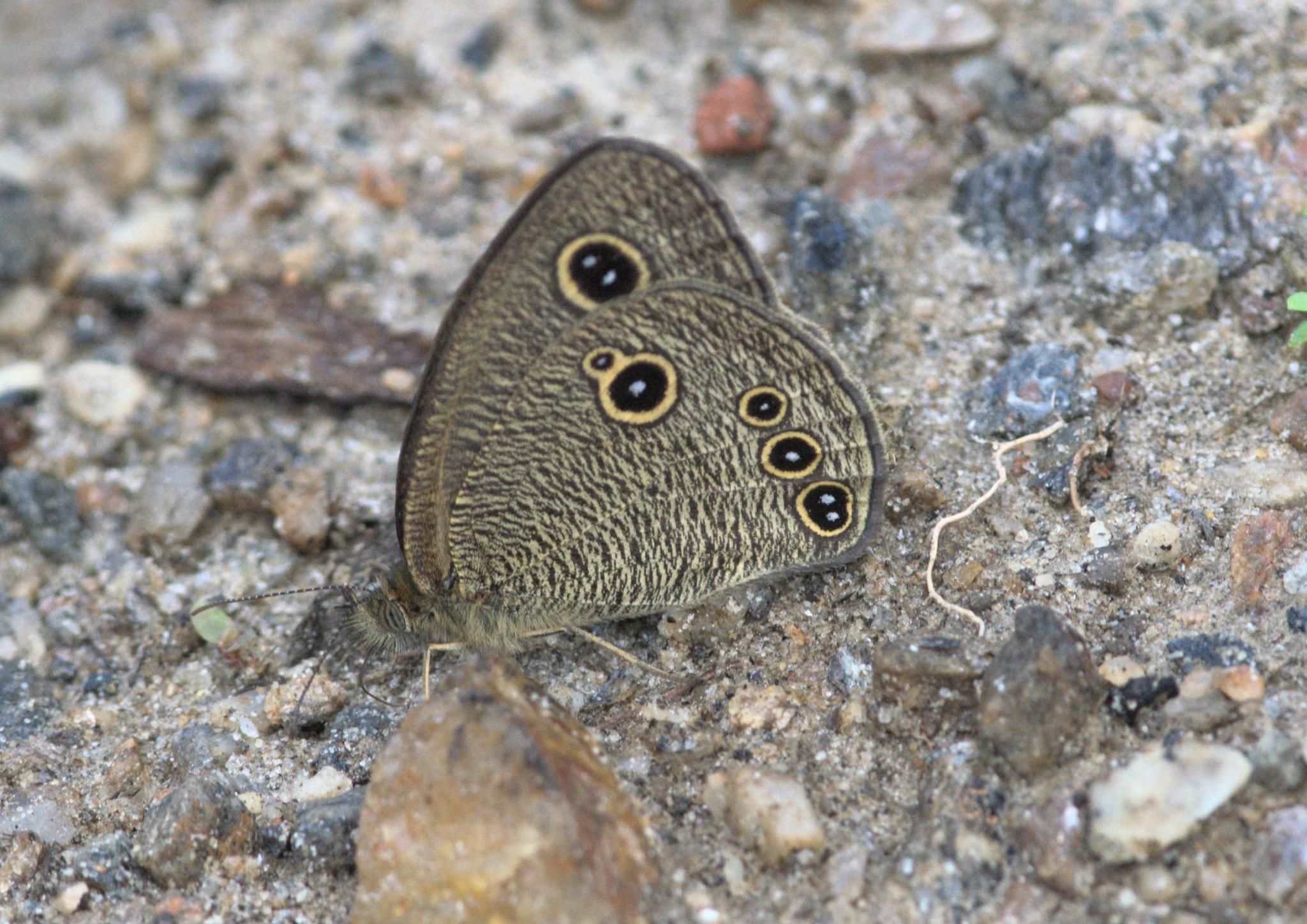
Moore's fivering, Ypthima nikaea

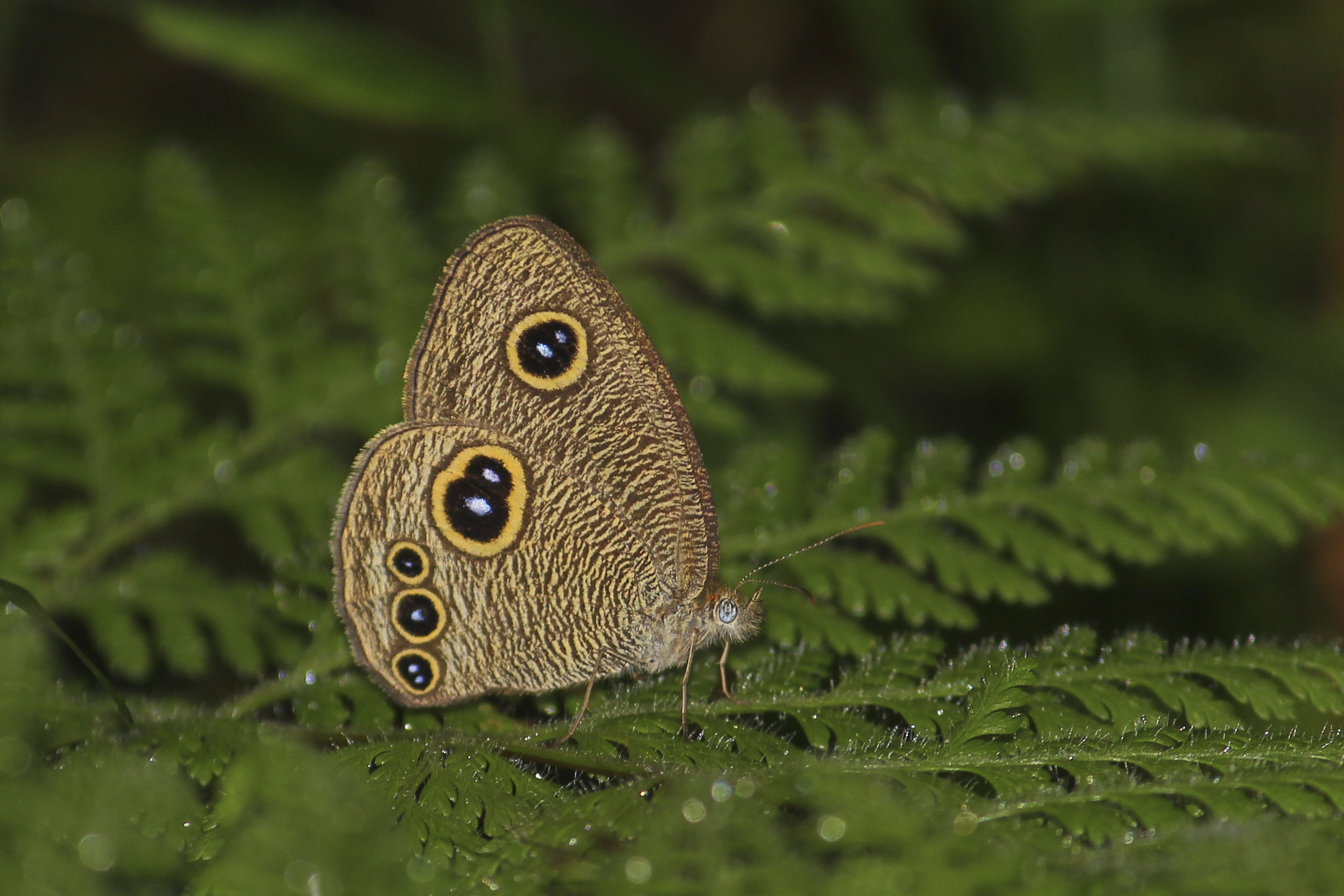
Himalayan fivering, Ypthima sakra

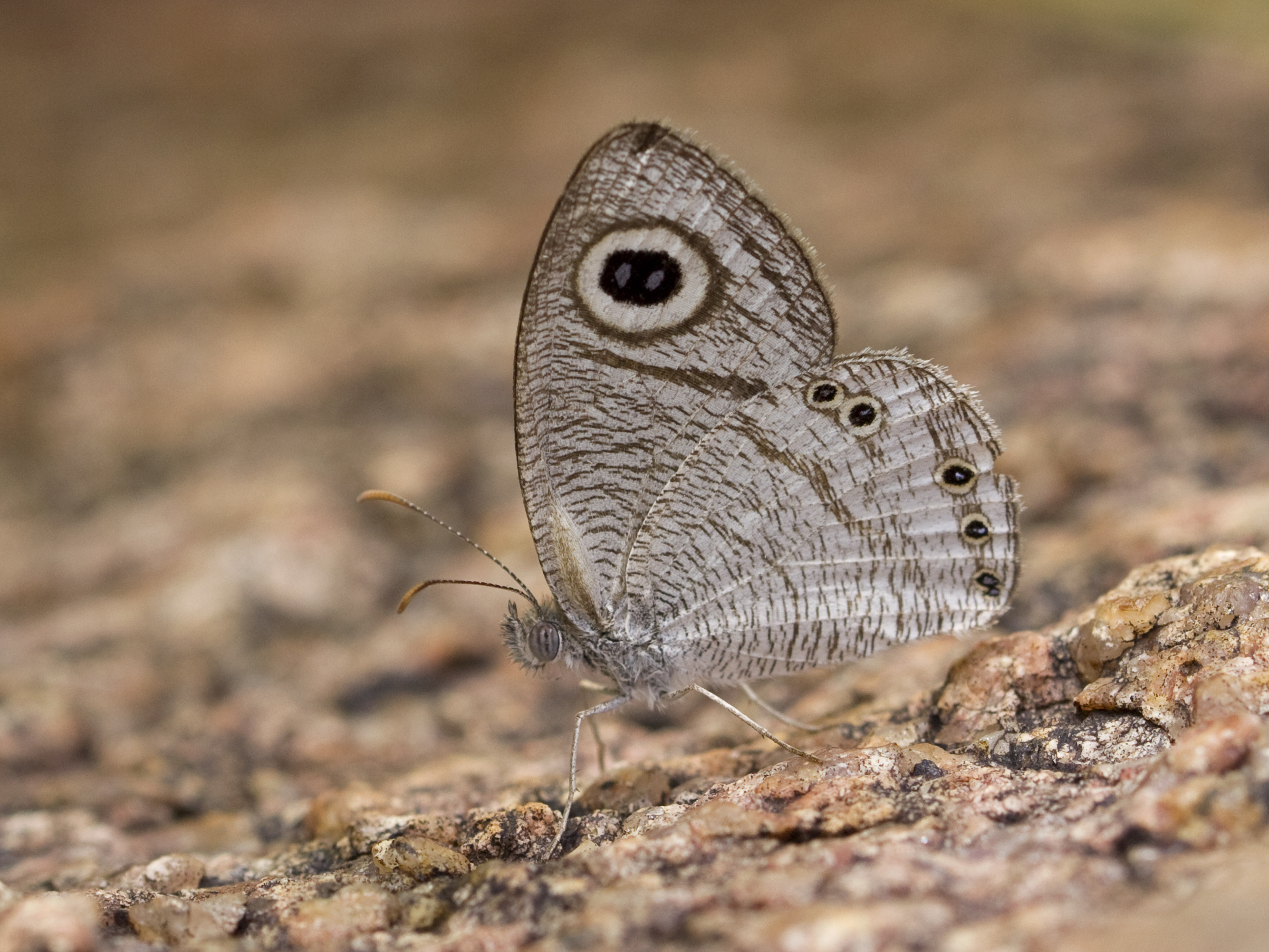
Nilgiri jewel fourring, Ypthima striata

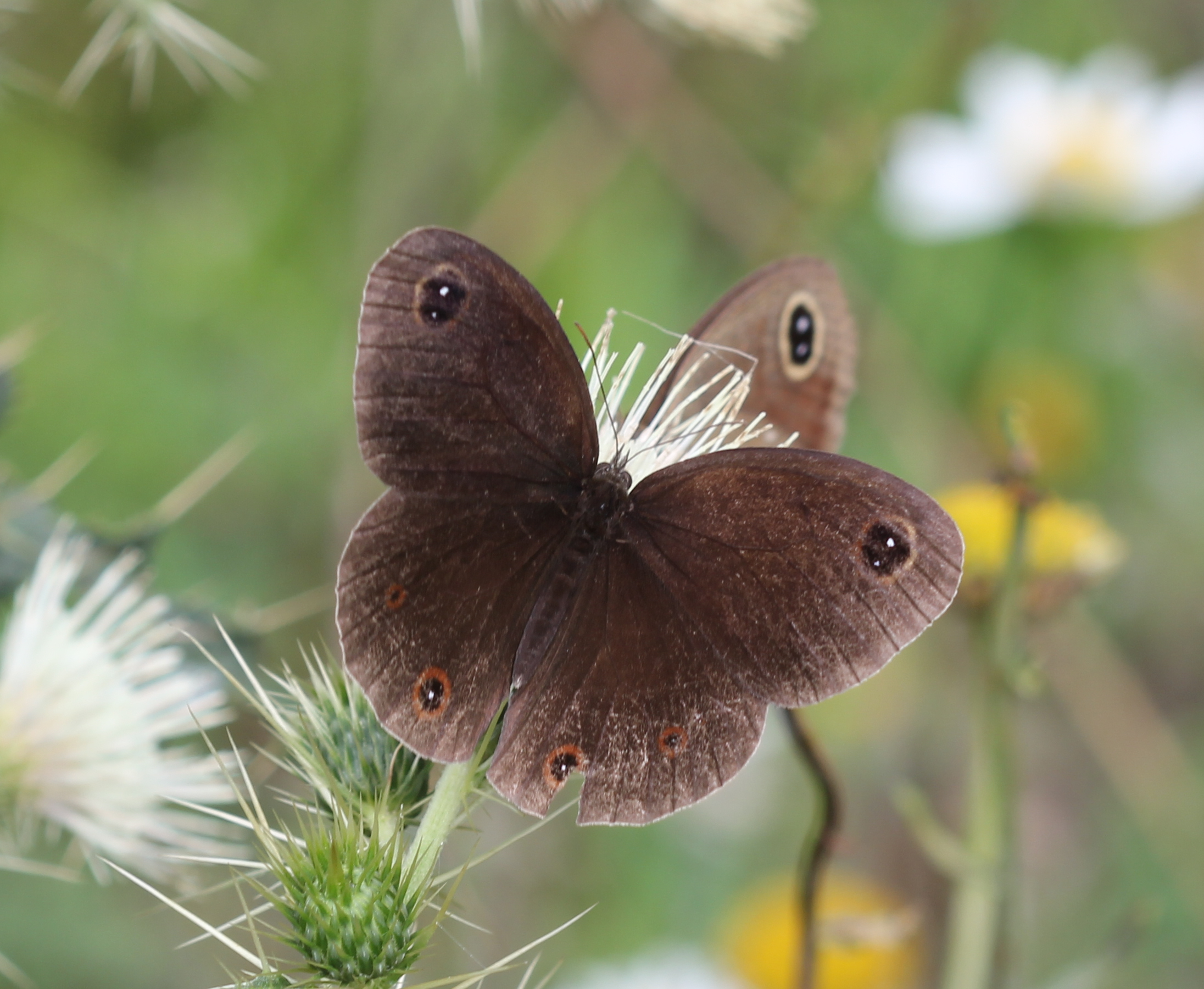
Common argus, Callerebia nirmala

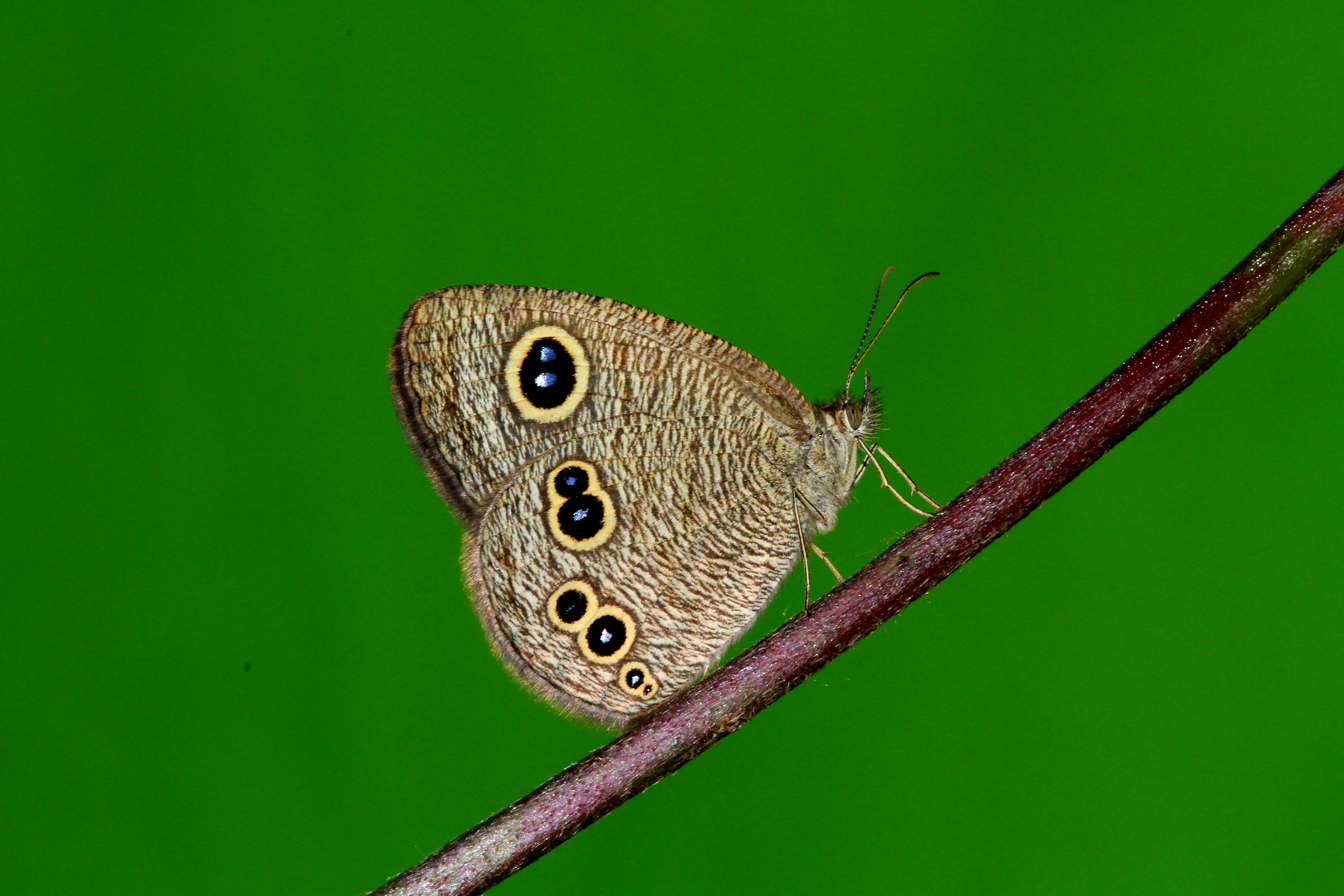
Indian fivering, Ypthima tabella

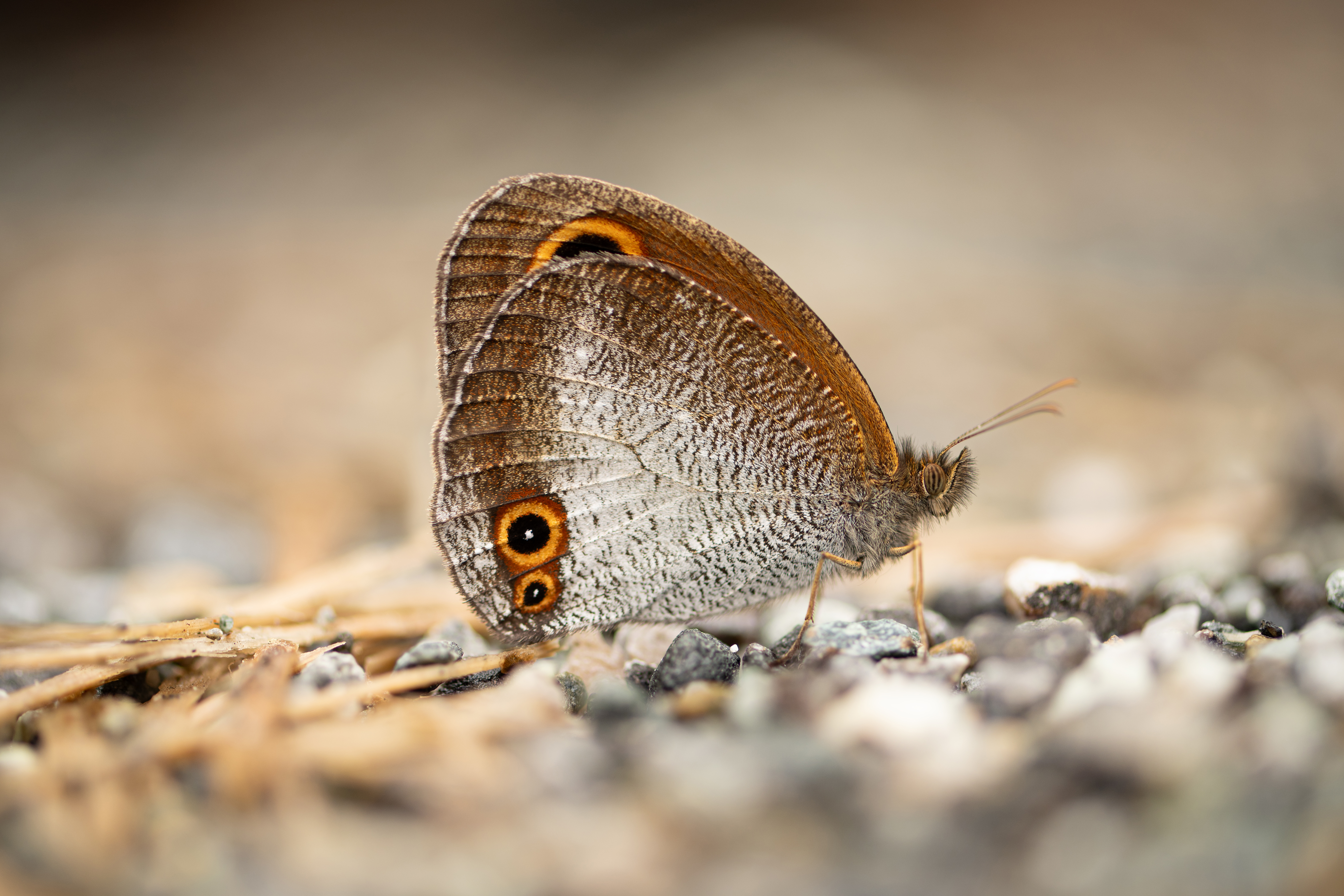
Pallid argus, Callerebia scanda

==== Satyrini ====
| Common name | Binomial name | Subspecies (in India) | Comments |
|---|---|---|---|
| Narrow-banded wall | Chonala albistricta | | |
| Chumbi wall | Chonala masoni | | |
| Yellow wall | Esperage cashmirensis | | |
| Scarce wall | Lasiommata maerula | 1 | Schedule 2 |
| Ladakh wall | Lasiommata maeroides | | |
| Dark wall | Lasiommata menava | 1 | Schedule 1 |
| Pakistan wall | Lasiommata pakistana | | |
| Common wall | Lasiommata schakra | 1 | |
| Tigerbrown | Orinoma damaris | 1 | |
| Small tawny wall | Orinoma moorei | 2 | |
| Large tawny wall | Orinoma satricus | 2 | Schedule 2 |
| Anderson's silverstripe | Lethe andersoni | | |
| Small goldenfork | Lethe atkinsonia | | Schedule 2 |
| Treble silverstripe | Lethe baladeva | | Schedule 2 |
| Rusty forester | Lethe bhairava | | |
| Dark forester | Lethe brisanda | | Schedule 2 |
| Angled red forester | Lethe chandica | 1 | |
| Banded treebrown | Lethe confusa | 1 | |
| Garwhal woodbrown | Lethe dakwania | | |
| Scarce lilacfork | Lethe dura | 1 | Schedule 1 |
| Scarce red forester | Lethe distans | | Schedule 1, Schedule 2 |
| Tamil treebrown | Lethe drypetis | 1 | |
| Eastern small silverfork | Lethe elwesi | | |
| Bamboo treebrown | Lethe europa | 4 | Schedule 1, Schedule 2 |
| Tytler's treebrown | Flavolethe gemina | 1 | Schedule 1 |
| Large goldenfork | Zophoessa goalpara | 3 | Schedule 2 |
| Dull forester | Lethe gulnihal | 1 | Schedule 1 |
| Common forester | Lethe hyrania | 2 | |
| Small silverfork | Lethe jalaurida | 1 | Schedule 2 |
| Manipur goldenfork | Lethe kabrua | | Schedule 2 |
| Manipur woodbrown | Zophoessa kanjupkula | | Schedule 2 |
| Bamboo forester | Lethe kansa | 1 | |
| Pale forester | Lethe latiaris | 1 | Schedule 2 |
| Barred woodbrown | Zophoessa maitrya | 1 | |
| Bhutan treebrown | Lethe margaritae | | Schedule 1 |
| Common red forester | Lethe mekara | 2 | |
| Möller's silverfork | Zophoessa moelleri | 1 | Schedule 2 |
| Naga treebrown | Lethe naga | 1 | Schedule 2 |
| Yellow woodbrown | Zophoessa nicetas | | |
| Small woodbrown | Zophoessa nicetella | | Schedule 2 |
| Single silverstripe | Lethe ramadeva | | Schedule 1 |
| Common treebrown | Lethe rohria | 2 | |
| Pallid forester | Lethe satyavati | | Schedule 1 |
| Blue forester | Lethe scanda | | Schedule 2 |
| Brown forester | Lethe serbonis | 1 | Schedule 2 |
| Scarce woodbrown | Zophoessa siderea | | Schedule 2 |
| Common woodbrown | Lethe sidonis | | |
| Tailed red forester | Lethe sinorix | 1 | Schedule 2 |
| Lilacfork | Lethe sura | | |
| Spotted mystic | Lethe tristigmata | | Schedule 2 |
| Straight-banded treebrown | Lethe verma | 2 | |
| Black forester | Lethe vindhya | 1 | |
| White-edged woodbrown | Lethe visrava | | Schedule 2 |
| Tibetan silverfork | Lethe wui | | |
| Chinese labyrinth | Neope armandii | 1 | |
| Tailed labyrinth | Neope bhadra | | |
| Veined labyrinth | Neope pulaha | 2 | Schedule 2 |
| Scarce labyrinth | Neope pulahina | | |
| Large veined labyrinth | Neope pulahoides | 1 | |
| Dusky labyrinth | Neope yama | 2 | Schedule 2 |
| Redeye bushbrown | Telinga adolphei | | |
| Betham's bushbrown | Telinga bethami | | Endemic |
| Palni bushbrown | Telinga davisoni | | Endemic |
| Moore's bushbrown | Telinga heri | | Schedule 2 |
| Naga bushbrown | Telinga kohimensis | | |
| Lepcha bushbrown | Telinga lepcha | | Schedule 2 |
| White-line bushbrown | Telinga malsara | | |
| Plain bushbrown | Telinga malsarida | | Schedule 2 |
| White-edged bushbrown | Telinga mestra | 1 | Schedule 2 |
| De Nicéville's bushbrown | Telinga misenus | 1 | Schedule 2 |
| Many-tufted bushbrown | Telinga mystes | | Schedule 2 |
| Bright-eyed bushbrown | Telinga nicotia | | |
| Red-disc bushbrown | Telinga oculus | | Endemic |
| Cyclops bushbrown | Culapa mnasicles | 1 | |
| Andaman bushbrown | Mydosama radza | | Endemic |
| Watson's bushbrown | Mycalesis adamsonii | 1 | Schedule 2 |
| Tawny bushbrown | Mycalesis anapita | 1 | |
| Whitebar bushbrown | Mycalesis anaxias | 2 | Schedule 2 |
| Tytler's bushbrown | Mycalesis evansii | | |
| Lilacine bushbrown | Mycalesis francisca | 2 | |
| Chinese bushbrown | Mycalesis gotama | 1 | Schedule 2 |
| Small long-brand bushbrown | Mycalesis igilia | | |
| Intermediate bushbrown | Mycalesis intermedia | | |
| Nicobar bushbrown | Mycalesis manii | | Endemic |
| Dark-brand bushbrown | Mycalesis mineus | 3 | |
| Purple bushbrown | Mycalesis orseis | 1 | Schedule 1 |
| Gladeye bushbrown | Mycalesis patnia | 1 | |
| Pachmari bushbrown | Mycalesis perseoides | | |
| Common bushbrown | Mycalesis perseus | 2 | |
| Wood-Mason's bushbrown | Mycalesis suaveolens | 3 | Schedule 2 |
| Long-brand bushbrown | Mycalesis visala | 3 | |
| Scarce catseye | Coelites nothis | 1 | Schedule 1 |
| Common cyclops | Erites falcipennis | | |
| Smooth-eyed bushbrown | Orsotriaena medus | 3 | |
| Tamil catseye | Zipaetis saitis | | Schedule 2, Endemic |
| Dark catseye | Zipaetis scylax | | |
| Striped ringlet | Ragadia crisilda | 2 | Schedule 2 |
| Ladakh heath | Coenonympha emmonsi | | |
| Short-branded meadowbrown | Hyponephele brevistigma | | |
| Branded meadowbrown | Hyponephele cheena | 3 | |
| Spotted meadowbrown | Hyponephele coenonympha | | |
| White-ringed meadowbrown | Hyponephele davendra | 1 | Schedule 2 |
| Pamir meadowbrown | Hyponephele hilaris | | |
| Tawny meadowbrown | Hyponephele pulchella | | |
| Dusky meadowbrown | Hyponephele pulchra | 5 | |
| Lesser white-ringed meadowbrown | Hyponephele tenuistigma | 1 | |
| White-edged rockbrown | Hipparchia parisatis | 2 | |
| Chitrali satyr | Kanetisa digna | | |
| Bicolor mountain satyr | Aulocera bicolor | | |
| Small satyr | Aulocera brahminoides | | |
| Narrow-banded satyr | Aulocera brahminus | 3 | |
| Chumbi satyr | Aulocera chumbica | 2 | |
| Gilgit satyr | Aulocera gilgitica | | |
| Eastern satyr | Aulocera kurogane | | |
| Doherty's satyr | Aulocera loha | 2 | |
| Great satyr | Aulocera padma | 4 | |
| Mountain satyr | Aulocera pumilus | 1 | |
| Striated satyr | Aulocera saraswati | 2 | |
| Sikkim mountain satyr | Aulocera sikkimensis | | |
| Common satyr | Aulocera swaha | 2 | |
| Zanskar satyr | Aulocera tsukadai | | |
| Avinoff's satyr | Karanasa alpherakyi | | |
| Turkestan satyr | Karanasa bolorica | 2 | |
| Tawny satyr | Karanasa huebneri | 7 | |
| Leech's satyr | Karanasa leechi | 1 | |
| Shandur satyr | Karanasa moorei | 2 | |
| Drosh satyr | Karanasa pupilata | | |
| Rohtang satyr | Karanasa rohtanga | | |
| Tibetan satyr | Oeneis buddha | 1 | Schedule 2 |
| Dark rockbrown | Chazara enervata | | |
| Shandur rockbrown | Chazara heydenreichi | | Schedule 2 |
| Spiti rockbrown | Pseudochazara baldiva | 4 | |
| Tytler's rockbrown | Pseudochazara droshica | | |
| Dark satyr | Satyrus alaica | | |
| Black satyr | Satyrus pimpla | 1 | |
| Khasi fivering | Ypthima affectata | | |
| Common threering | Ypthima asterope | 1 | |
| Black fivering | Ypthima atra | 1 | |
| Jewel fivering | Ypthima avanta | 2 | |
| Common fivering | Ypthima baldus | 3 | |
| Desert fourring | Ypthima bolanica | | Schedule 2 |
| White fourring | Ypthima ceylonica | | |
| Nilgiri fourring | Ypthima chenu | | Endemic |
| Confusing threering | Ypthima confusa | 1 | |
| Davidson's fivering | Ypthima davidsoni | | |
| Great fivering | Ypthima dohertyi | 1 | |
| Assam threering | Ypthima fusca | | |
| Hannyngton's fourring | Ypthima hannyngtoni | 1 | |
| Common fourring | Ypthima huebneri | | |
| Brown argus | Ypthima hyagriva | 1 | Schedule 2 |
| Western fivering | Ypthima indecora | | |
| Lesser threering | Ypthima inica | | |
| Kashmir fourring | Ypthima kasmira | | |
| Plain threering | Ypthima lycus | 1 | Schedule 2 |
| Menpa fivering | Ypthima menpae | | |
| Variegated fivering | Ypthima methora | | Schedule 2 |
| Large threering | Ypthima nareda | | |
| Newar threering | Ypthima newara | 1 | |
| Moore's fivering | Ypthima nikaea | | |
| Burmese threering | Ypthima norma | 1 | |
| Himalayan fourring | Ypthima parasakra | | |
| Manipur fivering | Ypthima persimilis | | Schedule 1 |
| Baby fivering | Ypthima philomela | 1 | |
| Himalayan fivering | Ypthima sakra | 2 | |
| Pallid fivering | Ypthima savara | | |
| Eastern fivering | Ypthima similis | | Schedule 2 |
| Small jewel fivering | Ypthima singala | 1 | |
| Karen fivering | Ypthima sobrina | | |
| Nilgiri jewel fourring | Ypthima striata | | Endemic |
| Indian fivering | Ypthima tabella | | Endemic |
| Taiwan fourring | Ypthima tappana | 1 | |
| Looped threering | Ypthima watsoni | 1 | |
| Palni fourring | Ypthima ypthimoides | | Endemic |
| Chitral argus | Paralasa chitralica | 1 | |
| Scarce mountain argus | Paralasa kalinda | 4 | Schedule 2 |
| Yellow argus | Paralasa mani | 2 | Schedule 2 |
| Mountain argus | Paralasa shallada | 1 | |
| Yasin argus | Paralasa yasina | | |
| Ringed argus | Callerebia annada | 2 | Schedule 2 |
| White-bordered argus | Callerebia baileyi | | |
| Roy's argus | Callerebia dibangensis | | |
| Hybrid argus | Callerebia hybrida | | |
| Common argus | Callerebia nirmala | 3 | |
| Moore's argus | Callerebia orixa | | |
| Pallid argus | Callerebia scanda | 2 | Schedule 2 |
| Manipur argus | Callerebia suroia | | |
| Naga argus | Callerebia watsoni | | |
| Mottled argus | Hemadara narasingha | 1 | Schedule 1 |

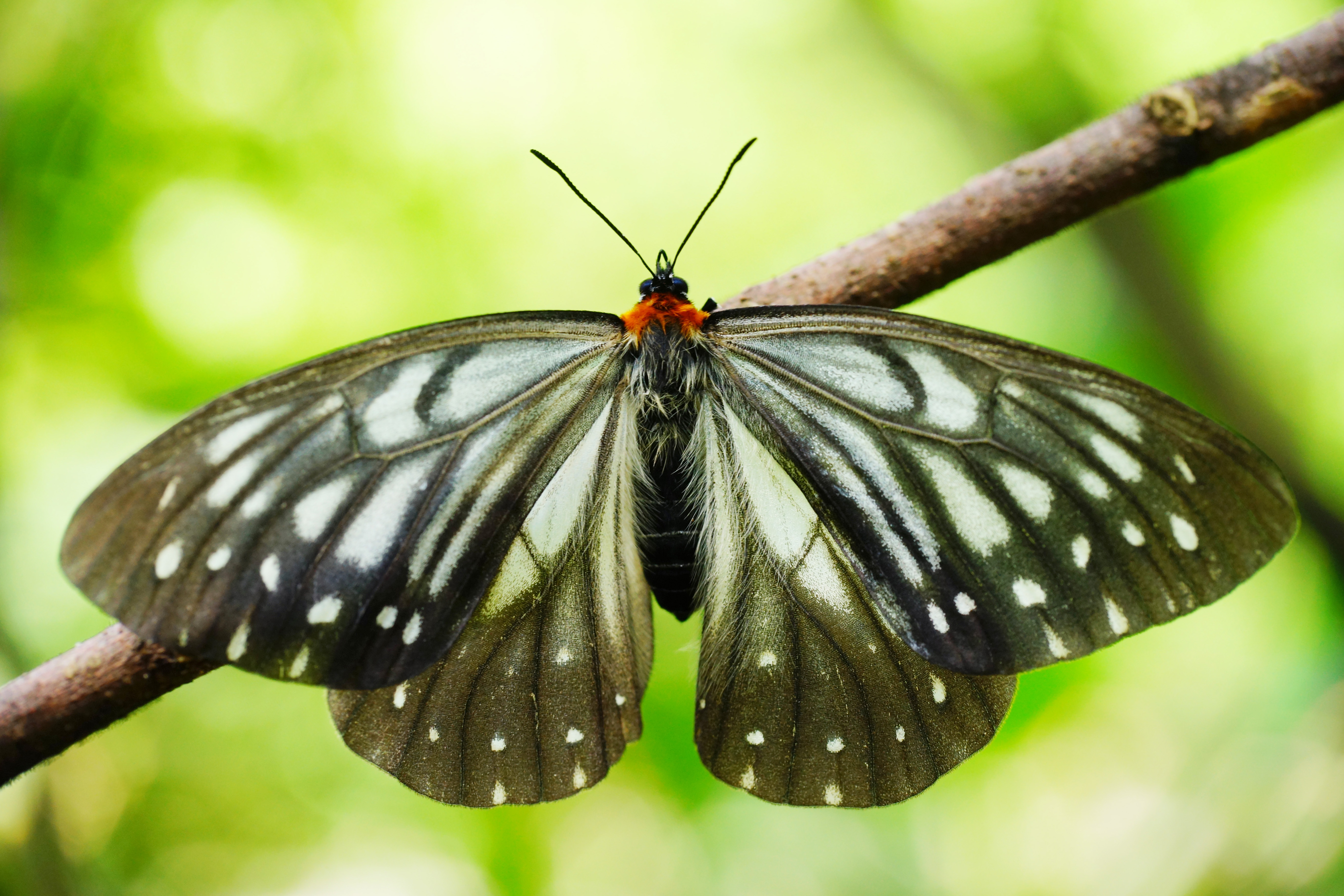
Freak, Calinaga buddha

=== Calinaginae ===
| Common name | Binomial name | Subspecies (in India) | Comments |
|---|---|---|---|
| Dark freak | Calinaga aborica | 2 | |
| Common freak | Calinaga brahma | 1 | |
| Freak | Calinaga buddha | 2 | Schedule 1, Schedule 2 |

=== Heliconiinae ===
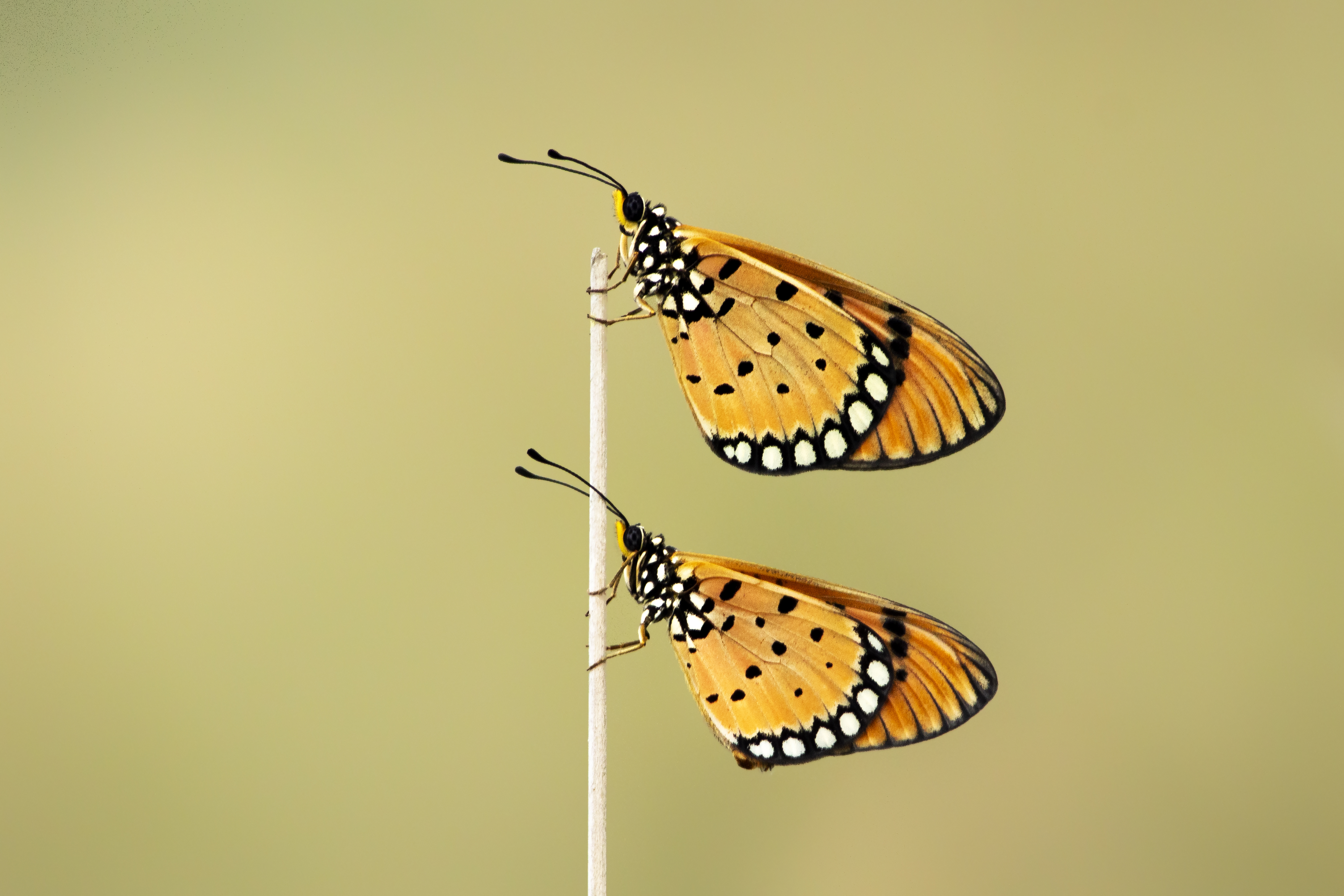
Tawny coster, Acraea terpsicore

==== Acraeini ====
| Common name | Binomial name | Subspecies (in India) | Comments |
|---|---|---|---|
| Tawny coster | Acraea terpsicore | | |
| Yellow coster | Telchinia issoria | 1 | |

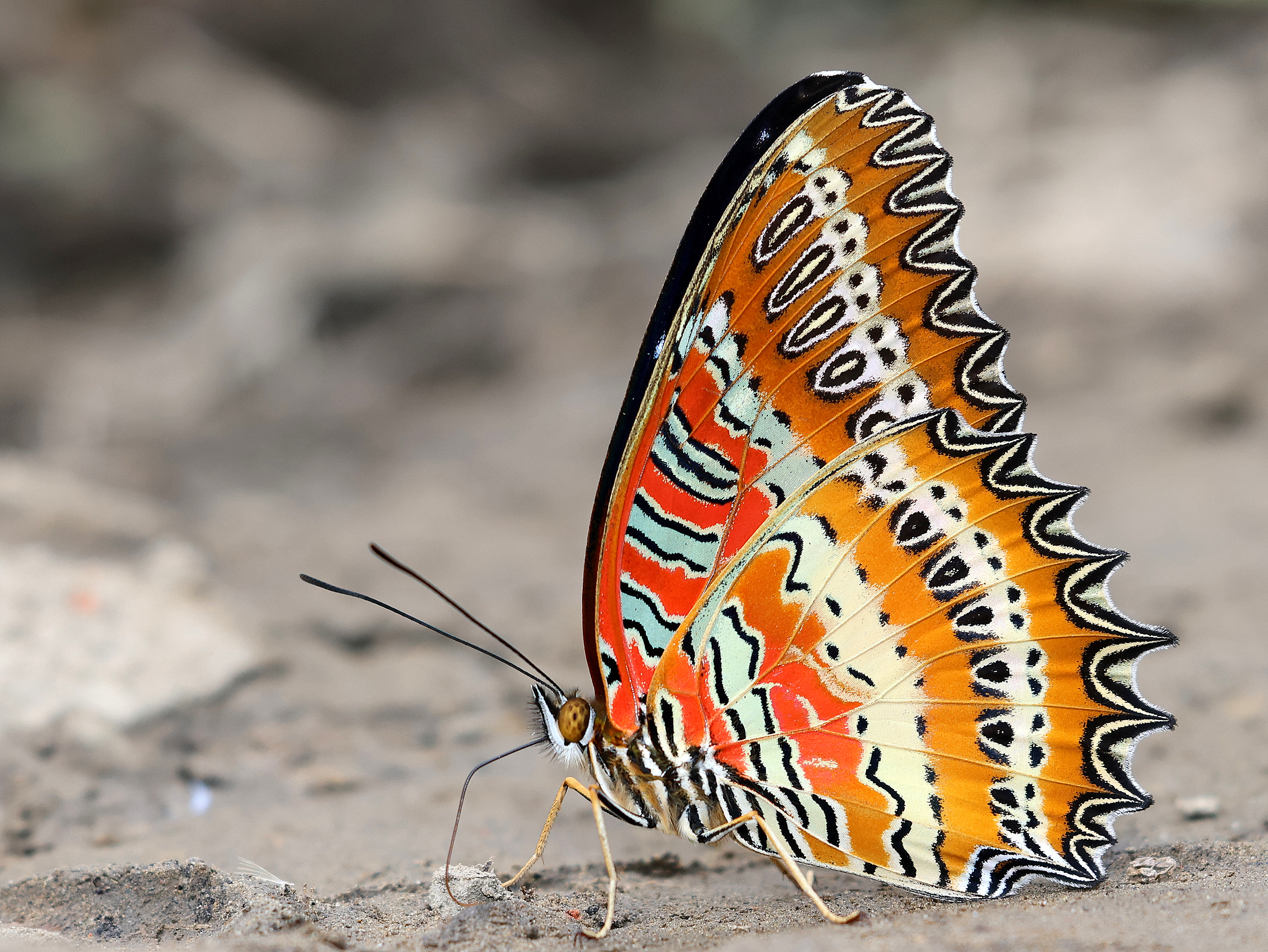
Red lacewing, Cethosia biblis

==== Cethosiini ====
| Common name | Binomial name | Subspecies (in India) | Comments |
|---|---|---|---|
| Red lacewing | Cethosia biblis | 3 | Schedule 2 |
| Leopard lacewing | Cethosia cyane | 1 | |
| Tamil lacewing | Cethosia nietneri | 1 | Schedule 2 |

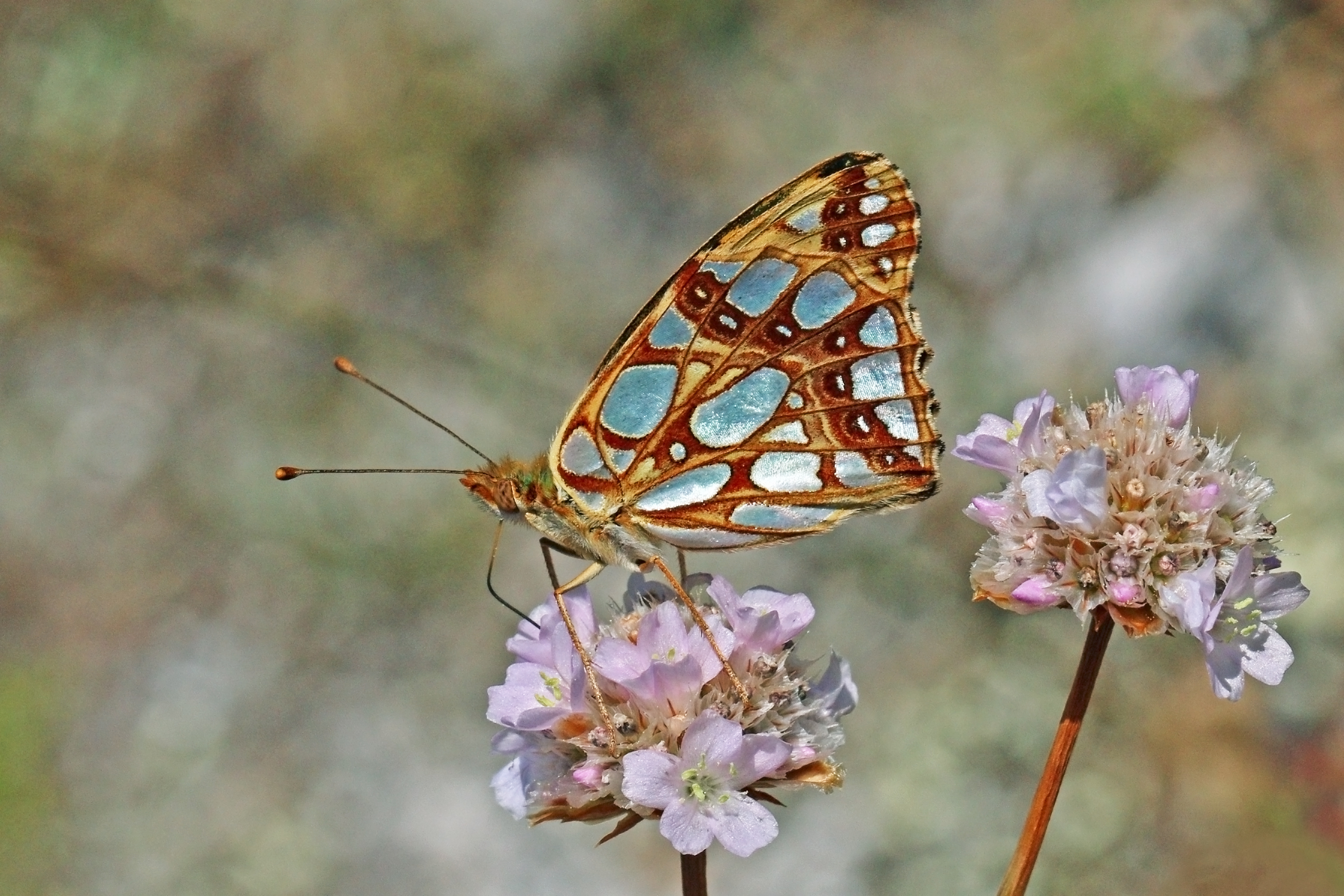
Queen of Spain fritillary, Issoria lathonia

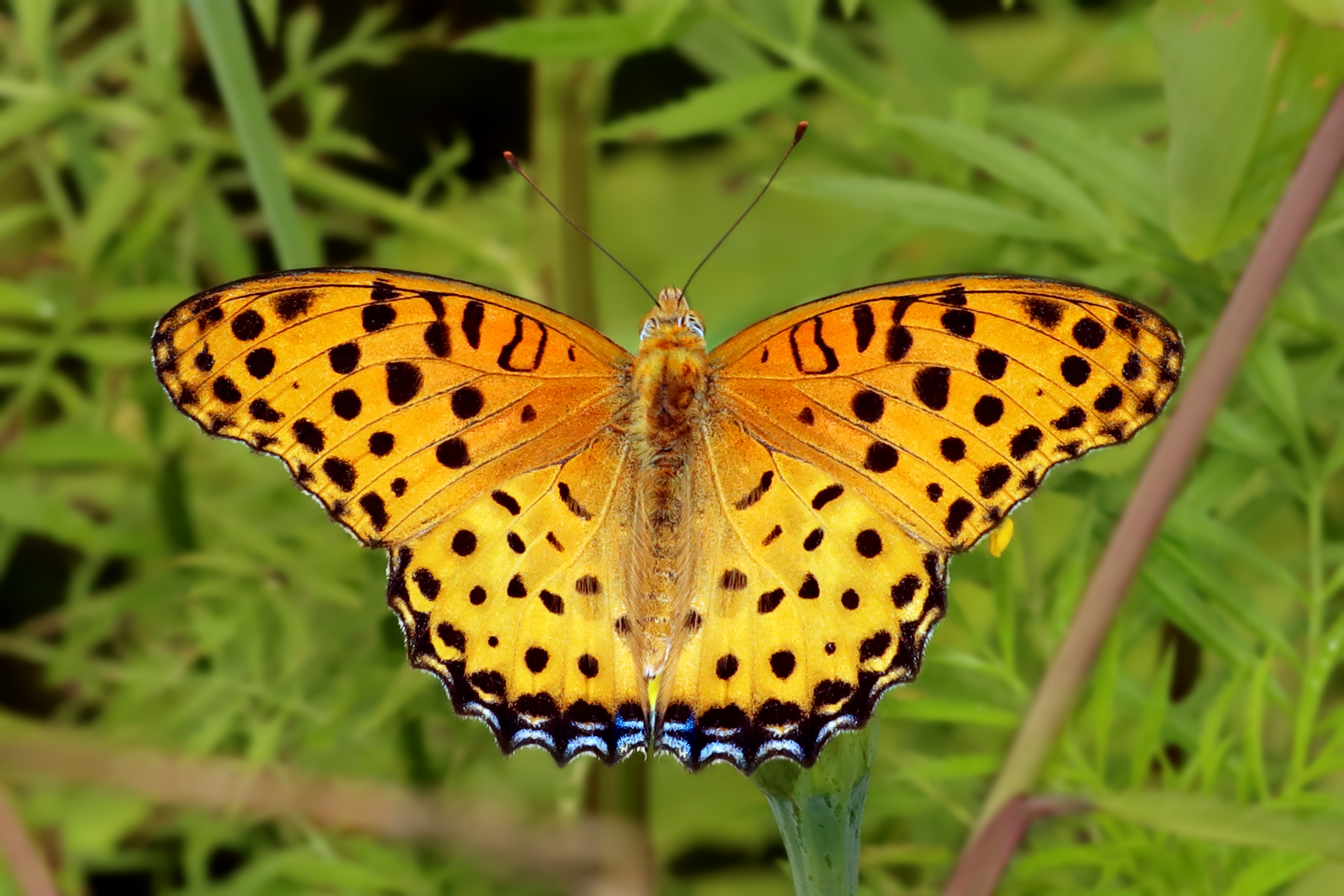
Indian fritillary, Argynnis hyperbius

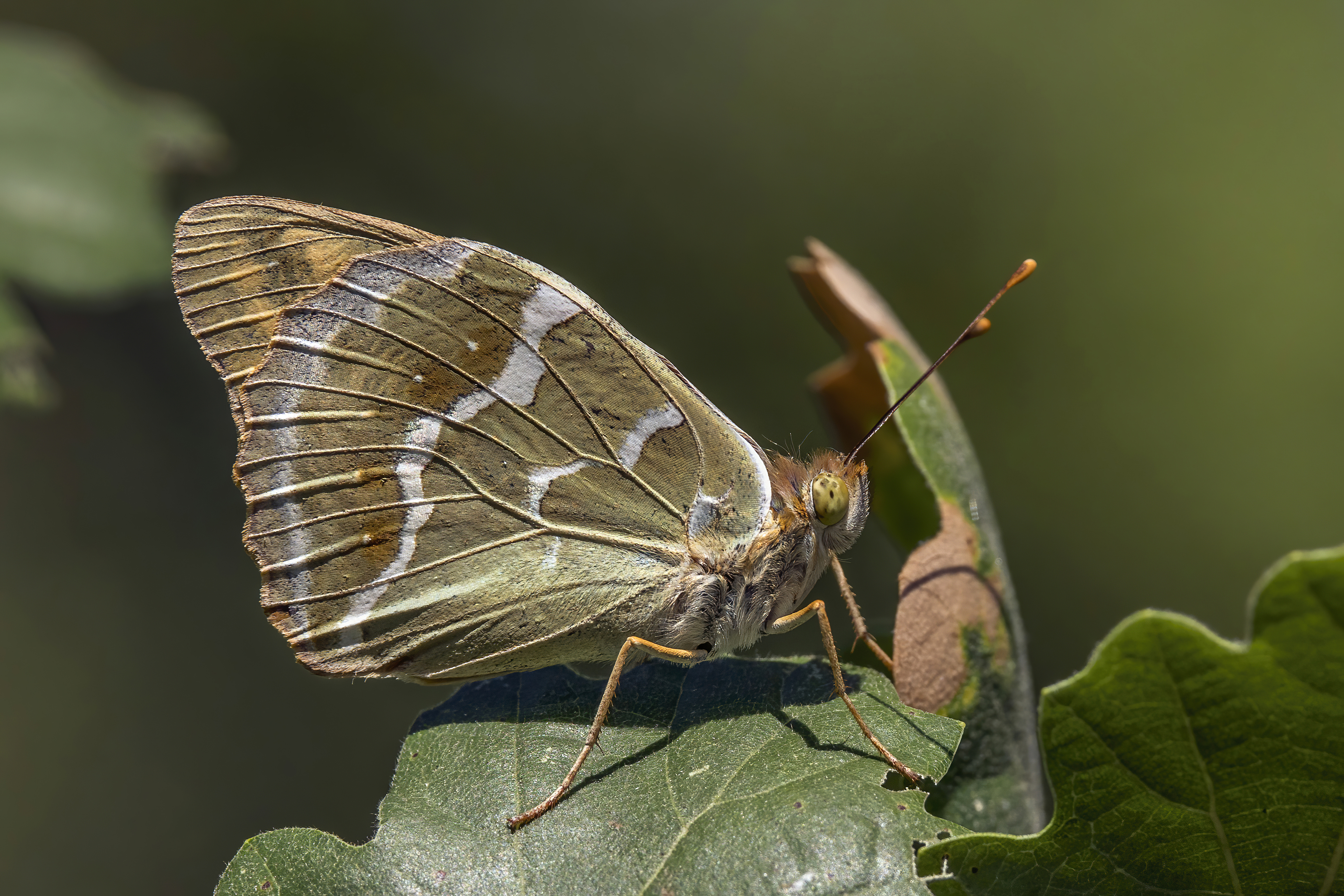
Cardinal, Argynnis pandora

==== Argynnini ====
| Common name | Binomial name | Subspecies (in India) | Comments |
|---|---|---|---|
| Whitespot fritillary | Boloria erubescens | | |
| Hunza silverspot | Boloria generator | | |
| Jerdon's silverspot | Boloria jerdoni | 1 | |
| Sikkim silverspot | Boloria eupales | | |
| Straightwing silverspot | Boloria sipora | 1 | |
| Mountain silverspot | Issoria altissima | | Schedule 2 |
| Gem silverspot | Issoria gemmata | | |
| Queen of Spain fritillary | Issoria lathonia | 1 | Schedule 2 |
| Dark green fritillary | Argynnis aglaja | 1 | |
| Large silverstreak | Argynnis childreni | 2 | |
| Silverstreak | Argynnis clara | 2 | Schedule 2 |
| Indian fritillary | Argynnis hyperbius | 3 | |
| Himalayan highbrown silverspot | Argynnis jainadeva | 2 | Schedule 2 |
| Common silverstripe | Argynnis kamala | | |
| Eastern silverstripe | Argynnis laodice | 1 | |
| Cardinal | Argynnis pandora | 1 | |
| Yunnan fritillary | Argynnis westphali | | |

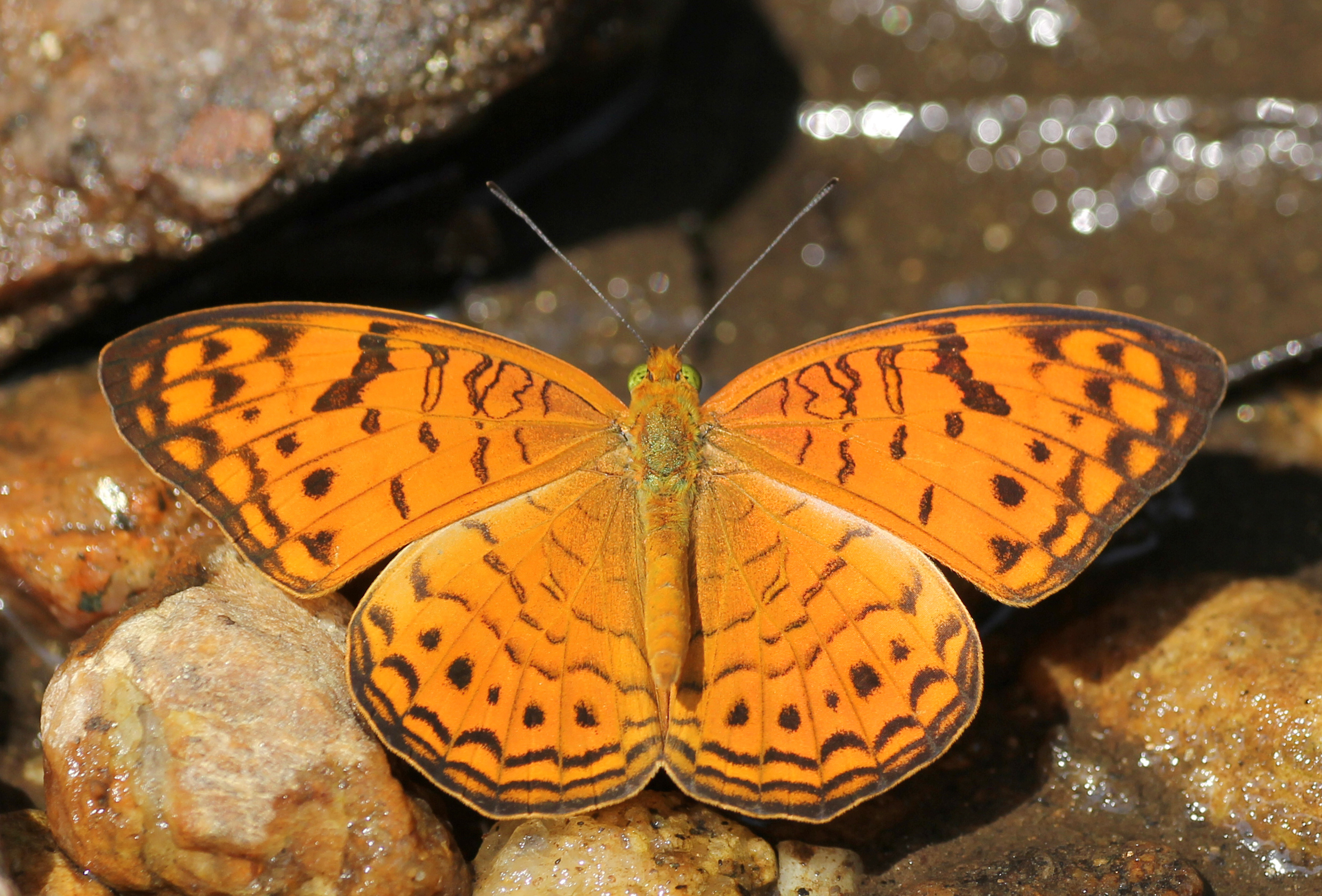
Small leopard, Phalanta alcippe

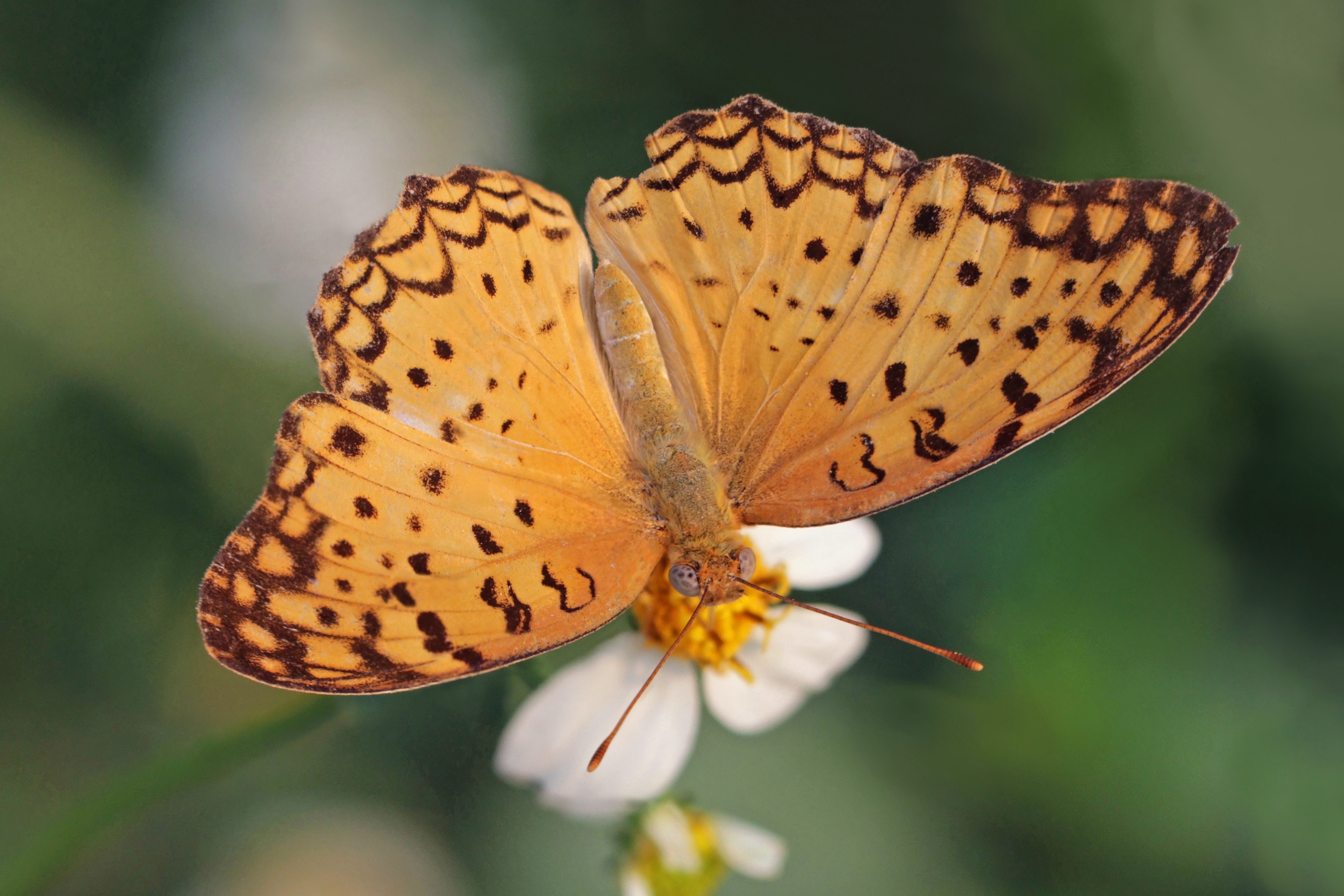
Common leopard, Phalanta phalantha

==== Vagrantini ====
| Common name | Binomial name | Subspecies (in India) | Comments |
|---|---|---|---|
| Small leopard | Phalanta alcippe | 4 | Schedule 2 |
| Common leopard | Phalanta phalantha | 1 | |
| Cruiser | Vindula erota | 3 | |
| Large yeoman | Cirrochroa aoris | 1 | |
| Nicobar yeoman | Cirrochroa nicobarica | | Endemic |
| Tamil yeoman | Cirrochroa thais | 1 | |
| Common yeoman | Cirrochroa tyche | 2 | |
| Branded yeoman | Algia fasciata | 1 | Schedule 1 |
| Rustic | Cupha erymanthis | 4 | |
| Vagrant | Vagrans sinha | 1 | |

=== Limenitidinae ===
==== Parthenini ====
| Common name | Binomial name | Subspecies (in India) | Comments |
|---|---|---|---|
| Clipper | Parthenos sylvia | 4 | Schedule 2 |

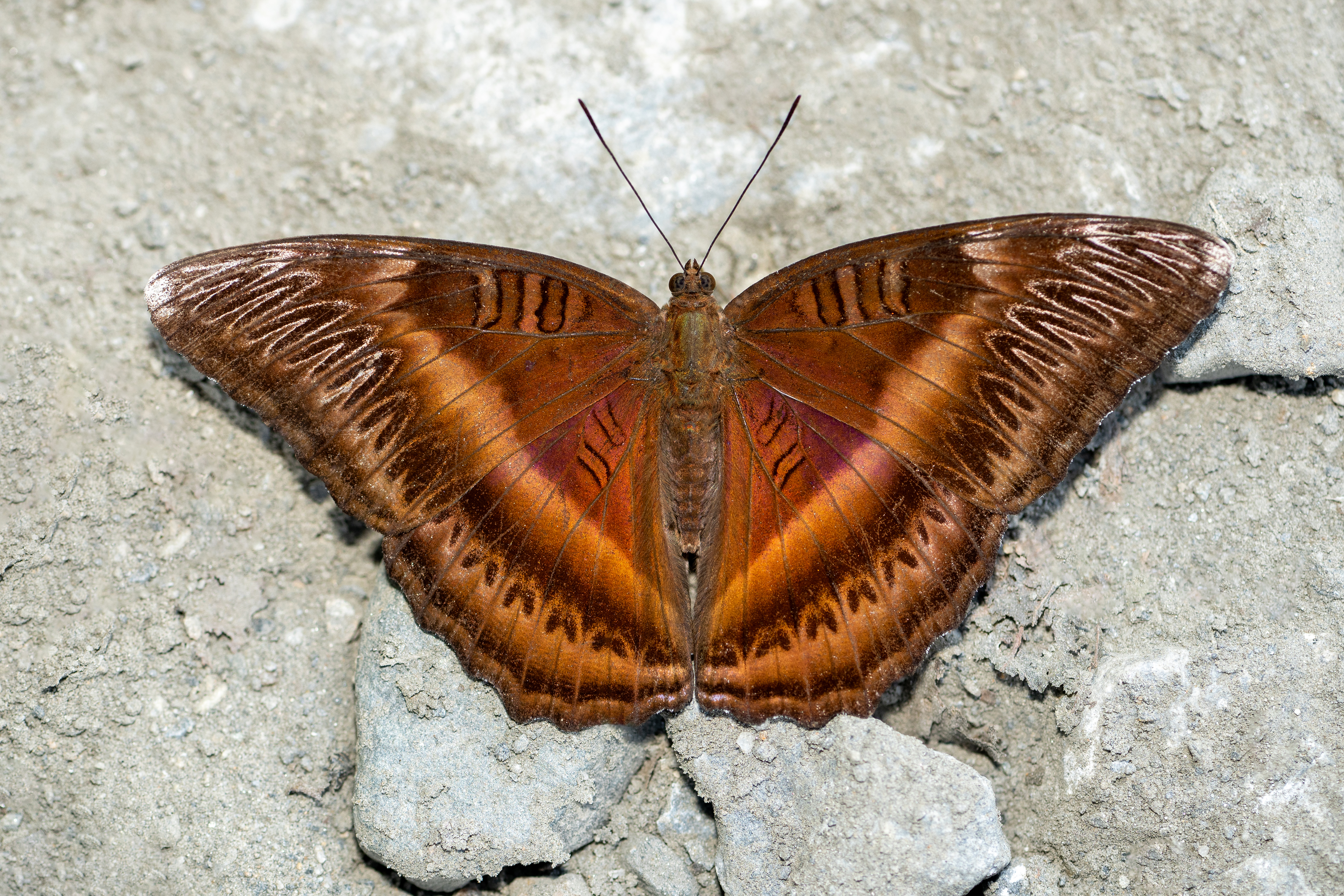
Grey commodore, Bhagadatta austenia

==== Cymothoini ====
| Common name | Binomial name | Subspecies (in India) | Comments |
|---|---|---|---|
| Grey commodore | Bhagadatta austenia | 2 | Schedule 2 |

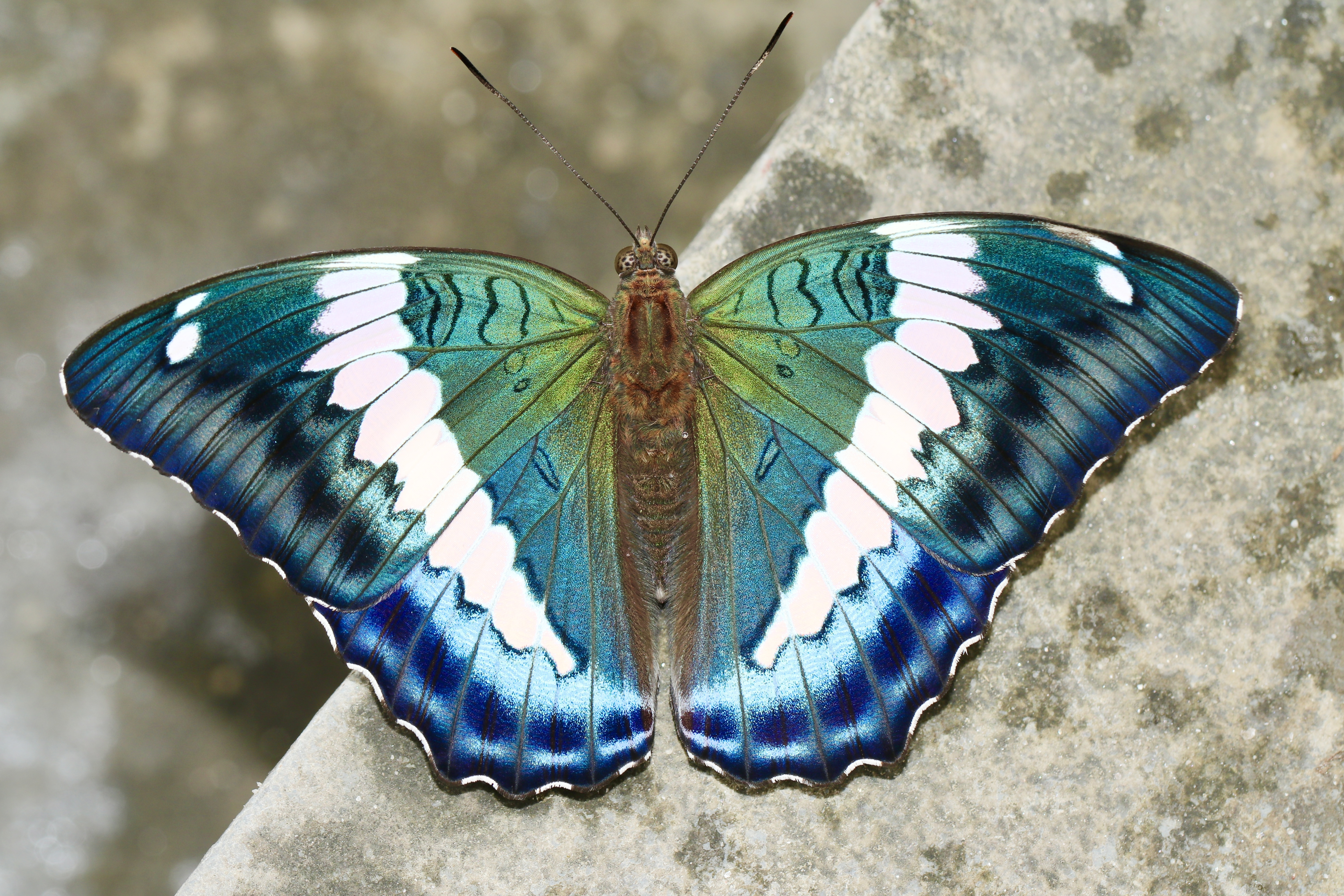
Blue duke, Euthalia durga

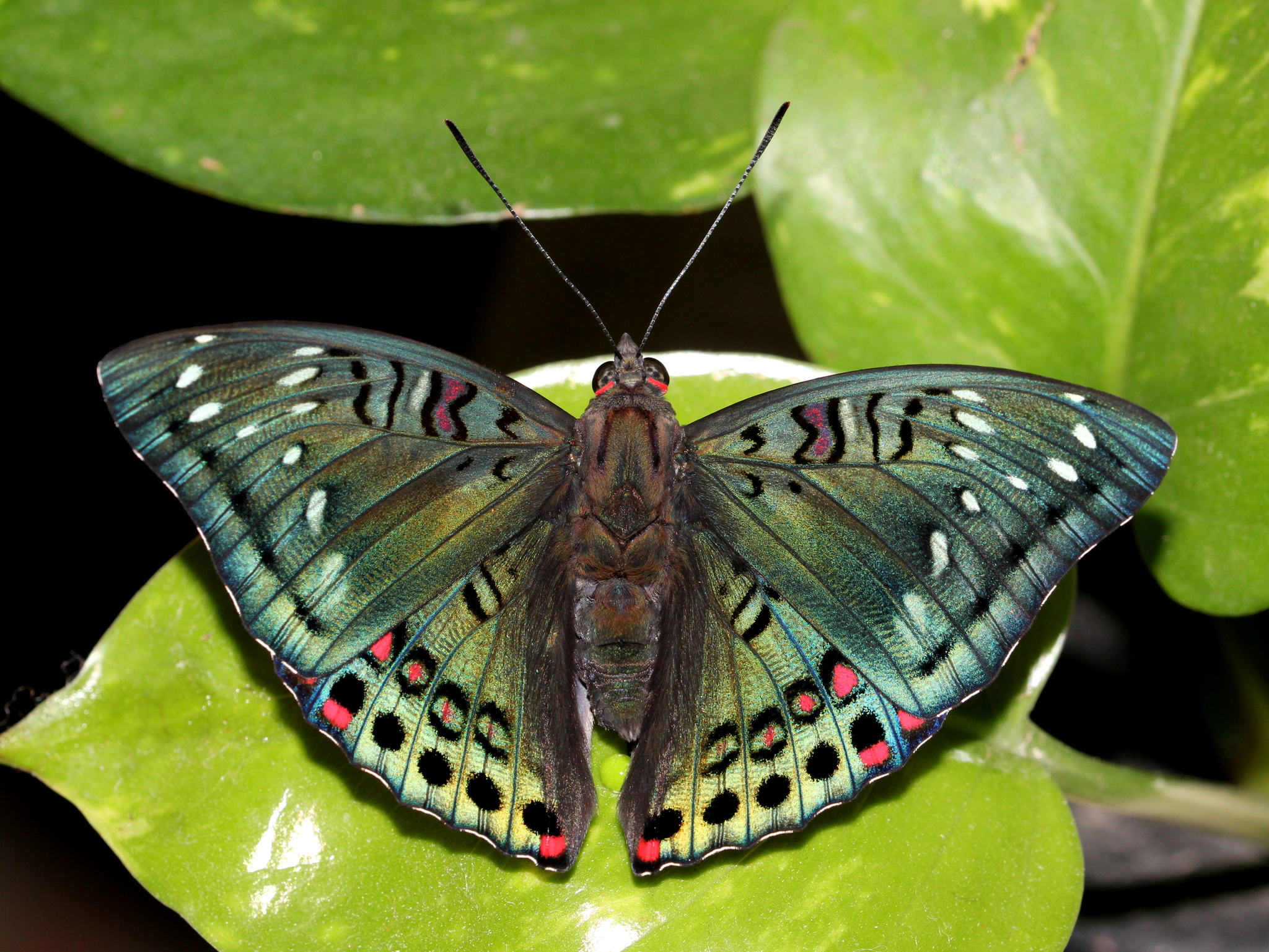
Gaudy baron, Euthalia lubentina

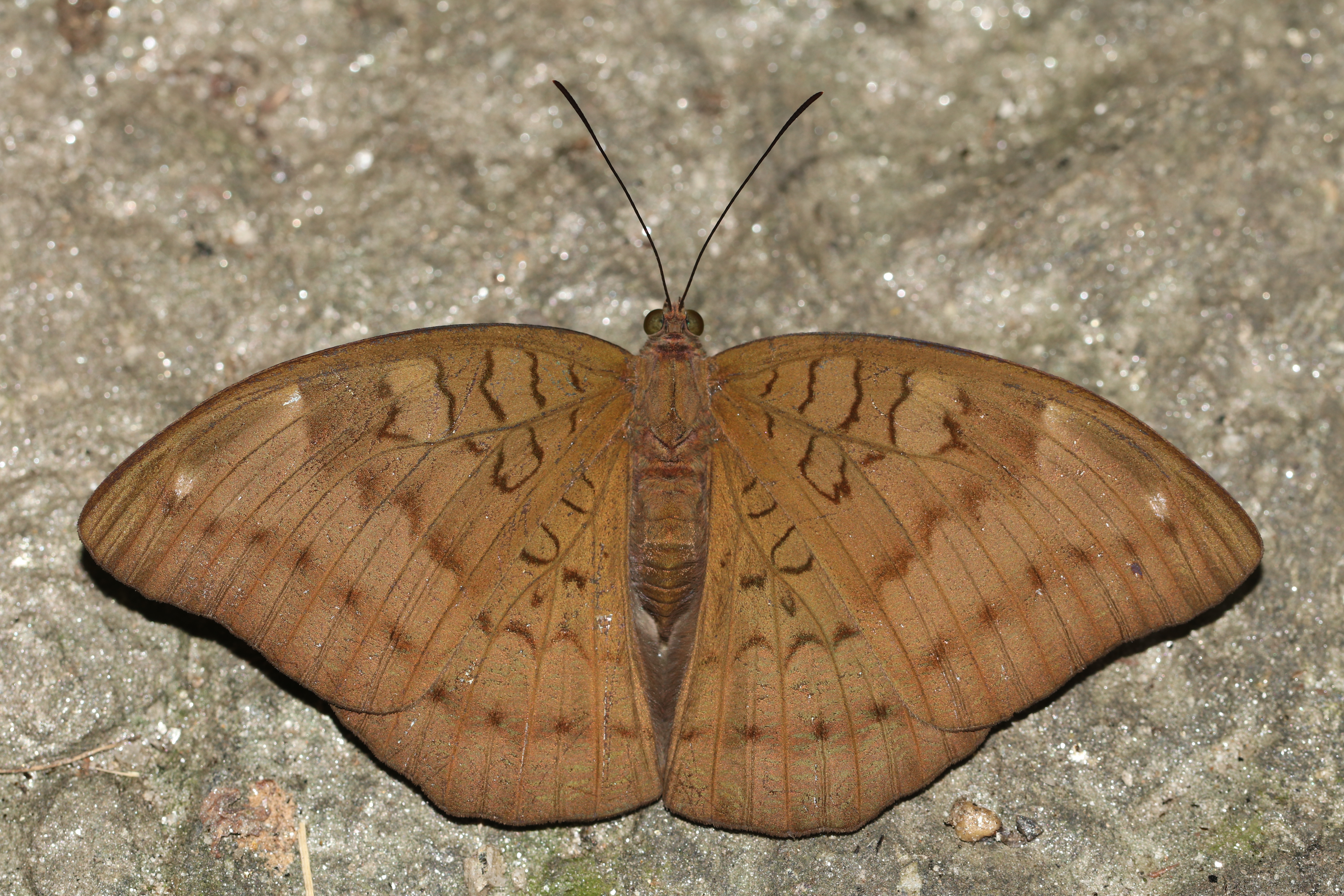
Common earl, Tanaecia julii

==== Adoliadini ====
| Common name | Binomial name | Subspecies (in India) | Comments |
|---|---|---|---|
| Common baron | Euthalia aconthea | 5 | Schedule 2 |
| Streaked baron | Euthalia alpheda | 1 | |
| Grey baron | Euthalia anosia | 1 | Schedule 2 |
| Chinese duke | Euthalia confucius | 1 | |
| Naga duke | Euthalia curvifascia | 1 | Schedule 1 |
| Blue duchess | Euthalia duda | 1 | Schedule 2 |
| Blue duke | Euthalia durga | 2 | Schedule 1 |
| French duke | Euthalia franciae | | Schedule 2 |
| Grand duke | Euthalia iva | 1 | Schedule 1 |
| Tytler's duchess | Euthalia lengba | 1 | |
| Gaudy baron | Euthalia lubentina | 2 | |
| Malay red baron | Euthalia malaccana | 1 | |
| Dark baron | Euthalia merta | 1 | Schedule 2 |
| Powdered baron | Euthalia monina | 1 | |
| Baronet | Euthalia nais | | |
| Bronze duke | Euthalia nara | 1 | Schedule 2 |
| Burmese baron | Euthalia narayana | 1 | |
| Grand duchess | Euthalia patala | 1 | Schedule 2 |
| White-edged blue baron | Euthalia phemius | 1 | |
| Green duke | Euthalia sahadeva | | |
| Mottled baron | Euthalia saitaphernes | 1 | |
| Blue baron | Euthalia telchinia | 1 | Schedule 1 |
| Tytler's duke | Euthalia thawgawa | | |
| Tibetan duke | Euthalia zhaxidunzhui | | |
| Basar duke | Euthalia zubeengargi | | Endemic |
| Andaman viscount | Tanaecia cibaritis | | Endemic |
| Lavender count | Tanaecia cocytus | 1 | Schedule 2 |
| Plain earl | Tanaecia jahnu | | |
| Common earl | Tanaecia julii | 1 | |
| Grey count | Tanaecia lepidea | 2 | Schedule 2 |
| Redspot duke | Dophla evelina | 2 | Schedule 2 |
| Great archduke | Lexias cyanipardus | 1 | Schedule 2 |
| Dark archduke | Lexias dirtea | 1 | Schedule 2 |
| Archduke | Lexias pardalis | 1 | Schedule 2 |
| Redtail marquis | Bassarona recta | 1 | |
| Banded marquis | Bassarona teuta | 2 | Schedule 2 |
| Sergeant-major | Abrota ganga | 1 | |

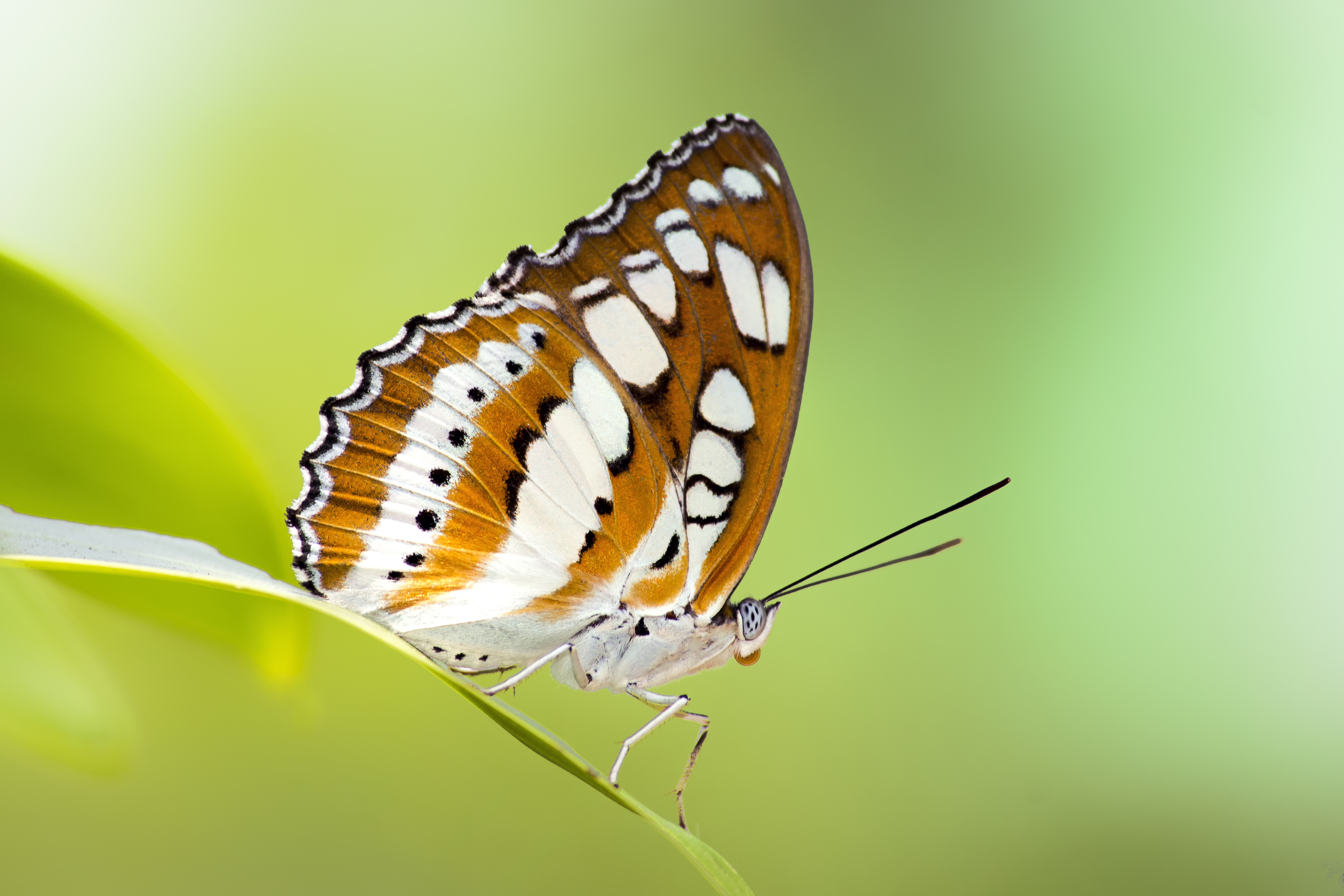
Common sergeant, Athyma perius

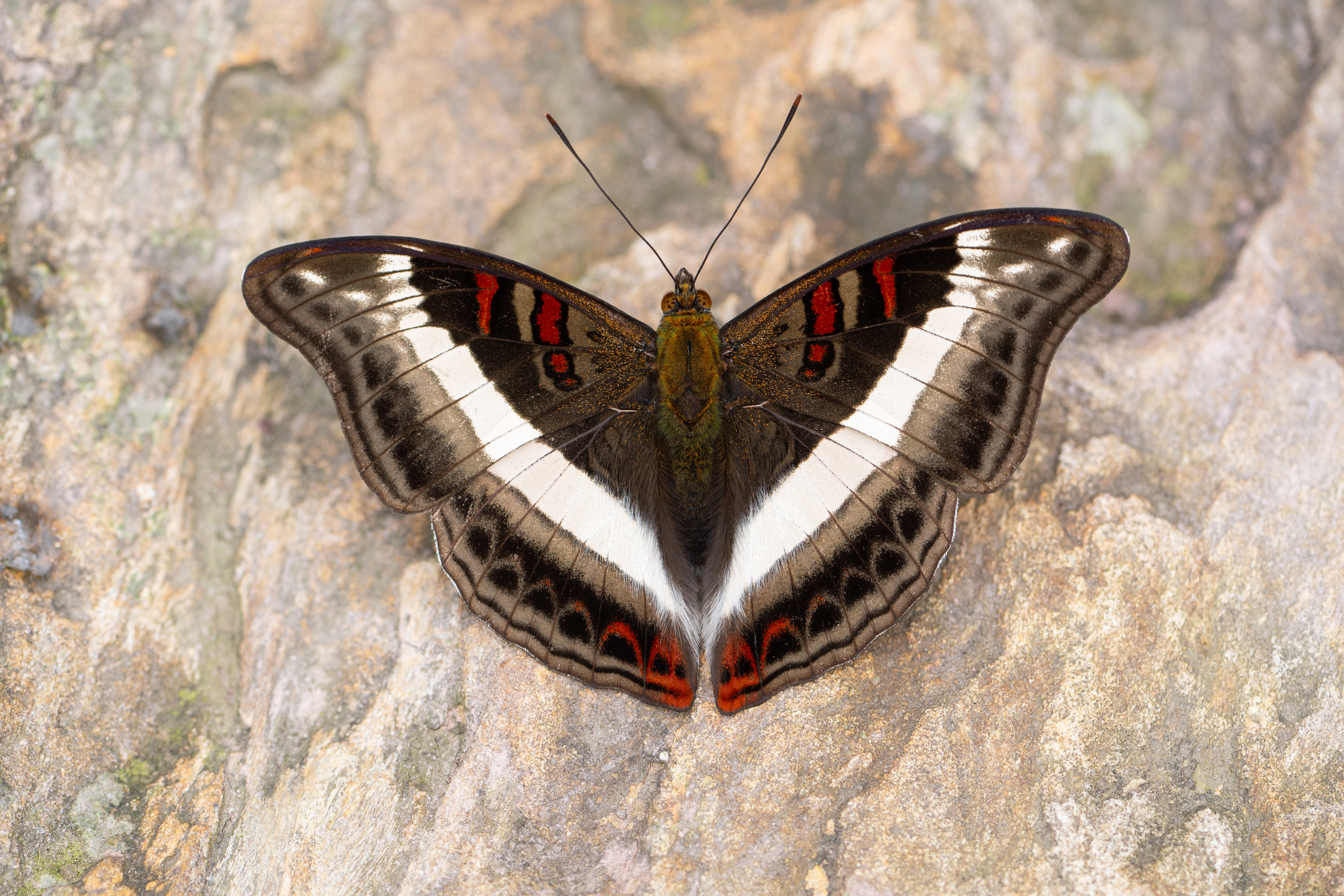
White commodore, Limenitis dudu

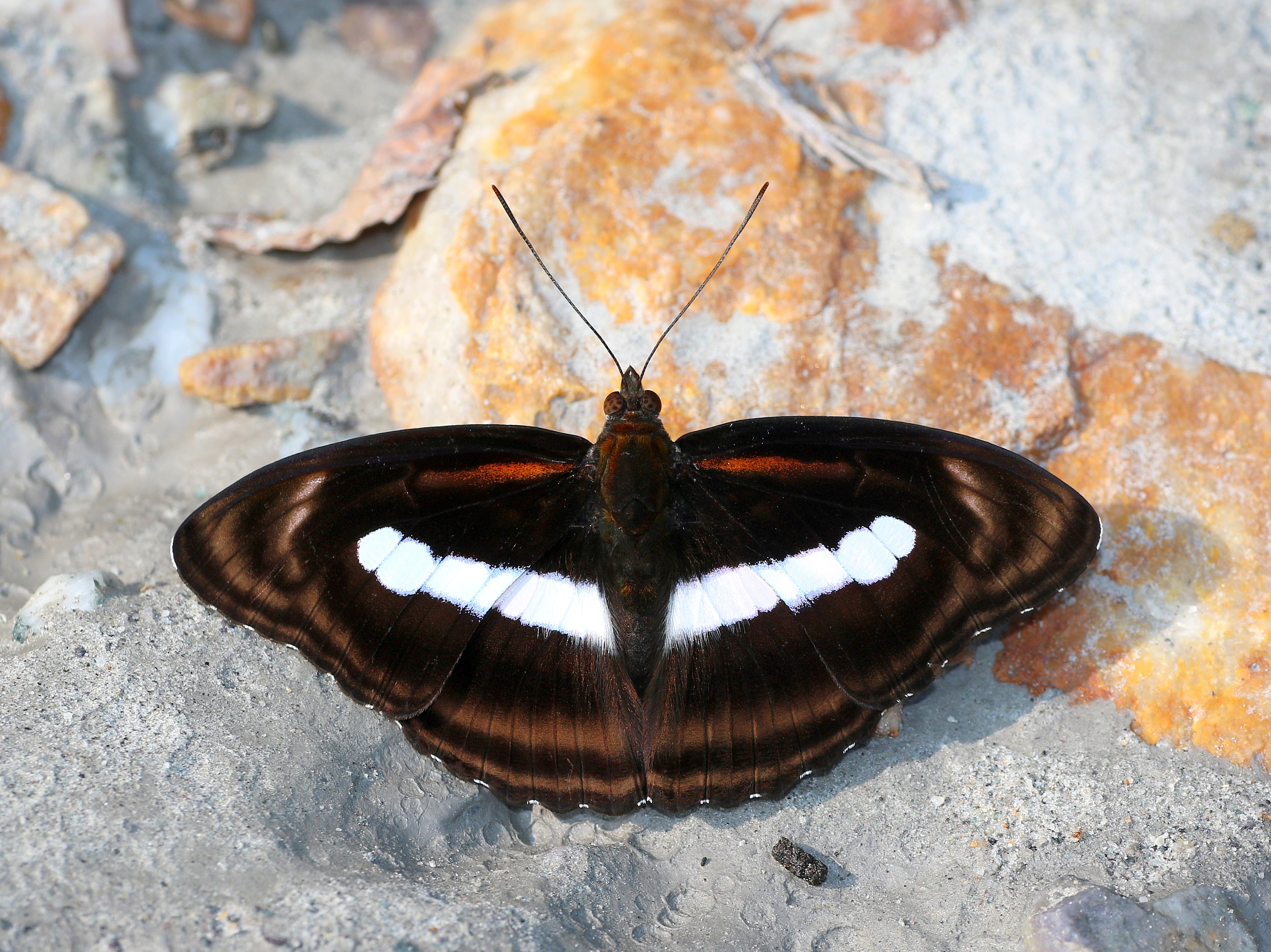
Staff sergeant, Athyma selenophora

==== Limenitidini ====
| Common name | Binomial name | Subspecies (in India) | Comments |
|---|---|---|---|
| Great sergeant | Tacola larymna | 1 | Schedule 2 |
| Commodore | Auzakia danava | 1 | Schedule 2 |
| Panther | Neurosigma siva | 1 | Schedule 2 |
| Commander | Moduza procris | 3 | |
| Orange staff sergeant | Athyma cama | 1 | |
| Green commodore | Athyma daraxa | 1 | |
| Dot-dash sergeant | Athyma kanwa | 1 | Schedule 2 |
| Tri-coloured sergeant | Athyma inara | 2 | |
| Hill sergeant | Athyma opalina | 1 | |
| Oriental sergeant | Athyma orientalis | 1 | |
| Common sergeant | Athyma perius | 1 | |
| Unbroken sergeant | Athyma pravara | 1 | Schedule 2 |
| White-patched sergeant | Athyma punctata | 1 | |
| Blackvein sergeant | Athyma ranga | 2 | Schedule 2 |
| Malay staff sergeant | Athyma reta | 1 | Schedule 1 |
| Andaman sergeant | Athyma rufula | | Endemic |
| Staff sergeant | Athyma selenophora | 3 | |
| Cryptic sergeant | Athyma whitei | 1 | |
| Tibetan sergeant | Athyma yui | | |
| Small staff sergeant | Athyma zeroca | 1 | |
| Bicolour commodore | Parasarpa zayla | | |
| Scarce white commodore | Parasarpa zulema | | Schedule 1 |
| Studded sergeant | Limenitis asura | 1 | Schedule 2 |
| White commodore | Limenitis dudu | 1 | Schedule 2 |
| Chitral white admiral | Limenitis hydaspes | 2 | |
| Bhutan sergeant | Limenitis jina | 1 | Schedule 1 |
| Kashmir white admiral | Limenitis ligyes | 1 | |
| Mishmi admiral | Limenitis rileyi | 1 | |
| Indian white admiral | Limenitis trivena | 2 | |

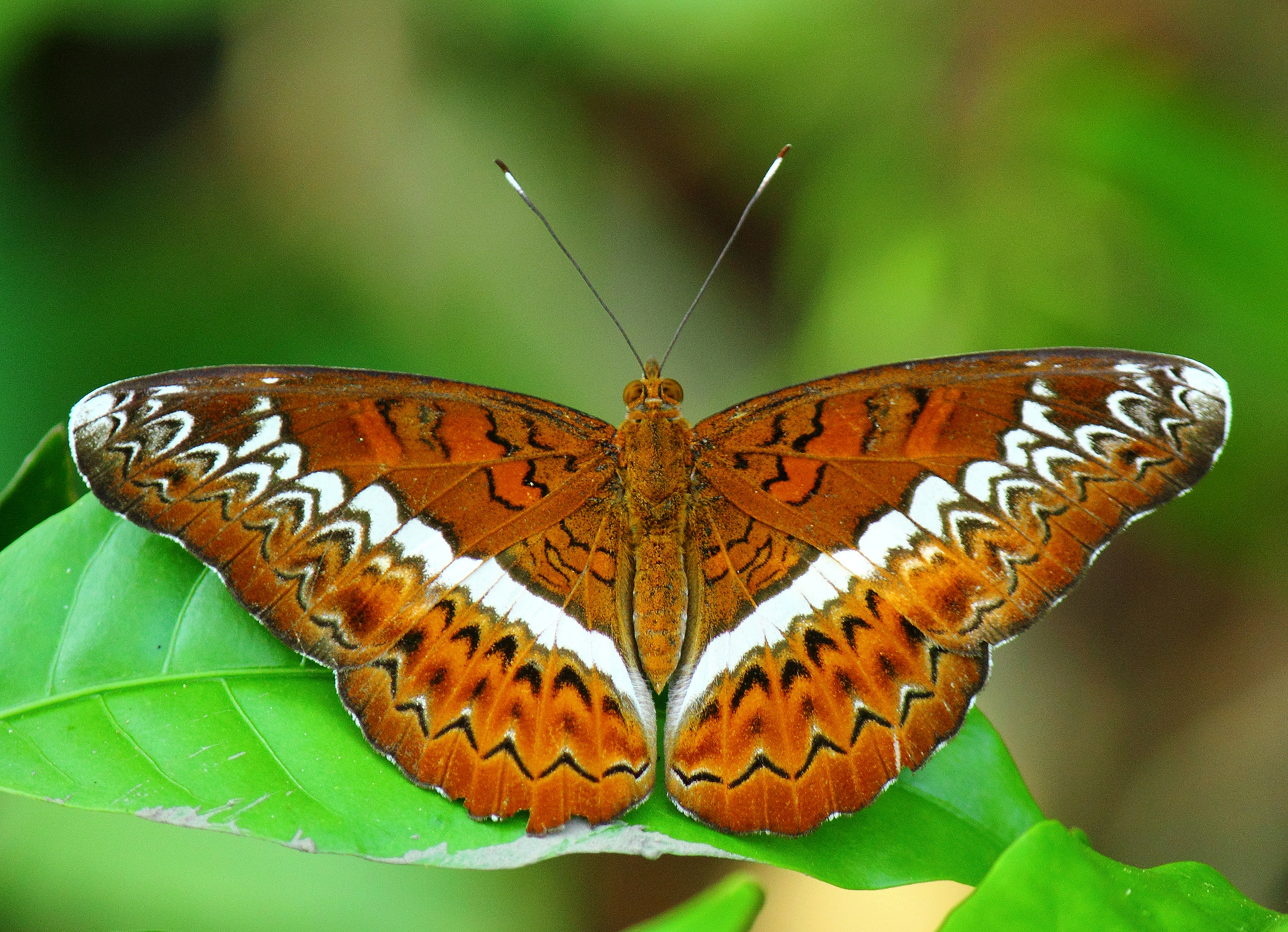
Knight, Lebadea martha

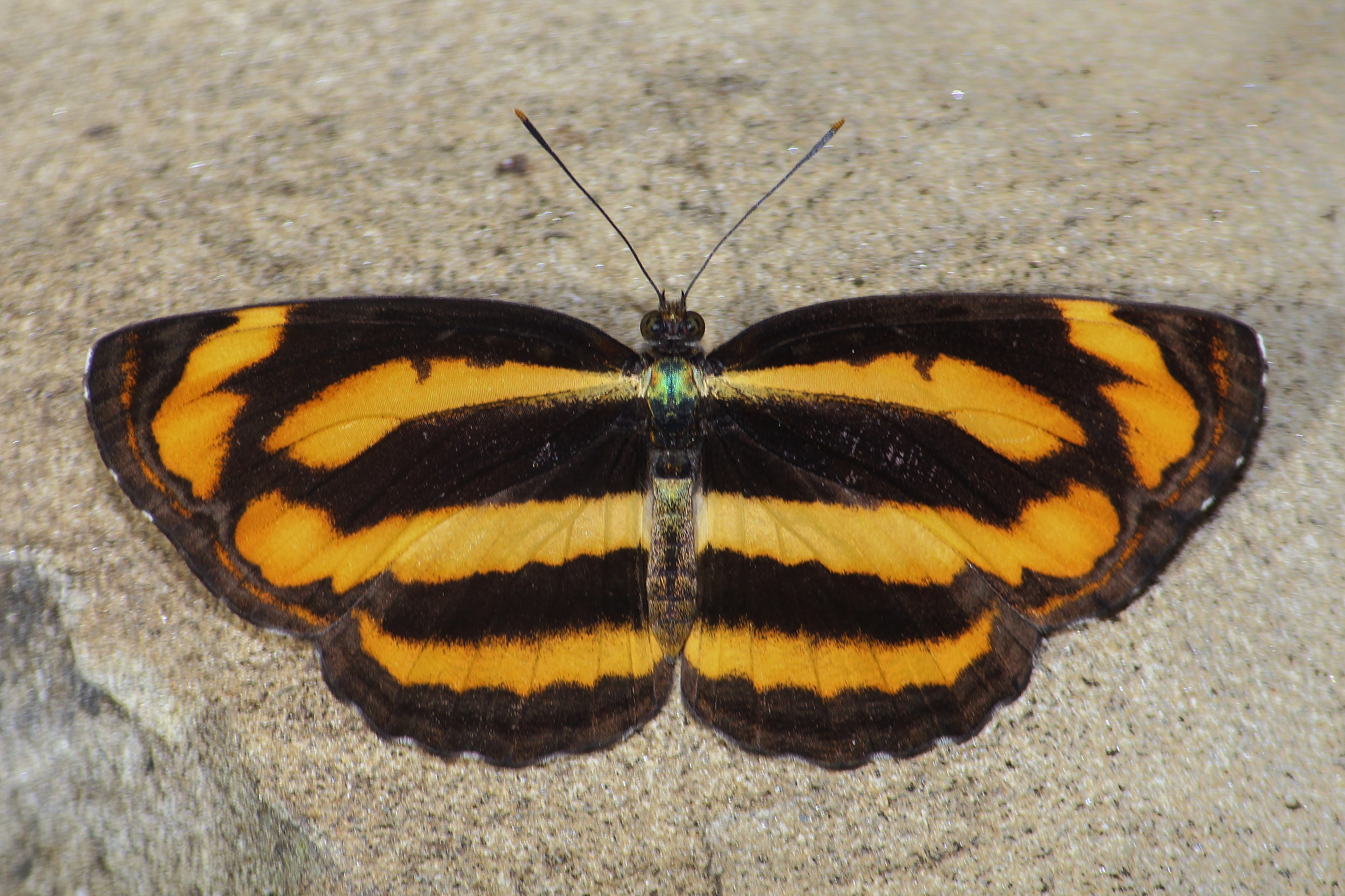
Common lascar, Pantoporia hordonia

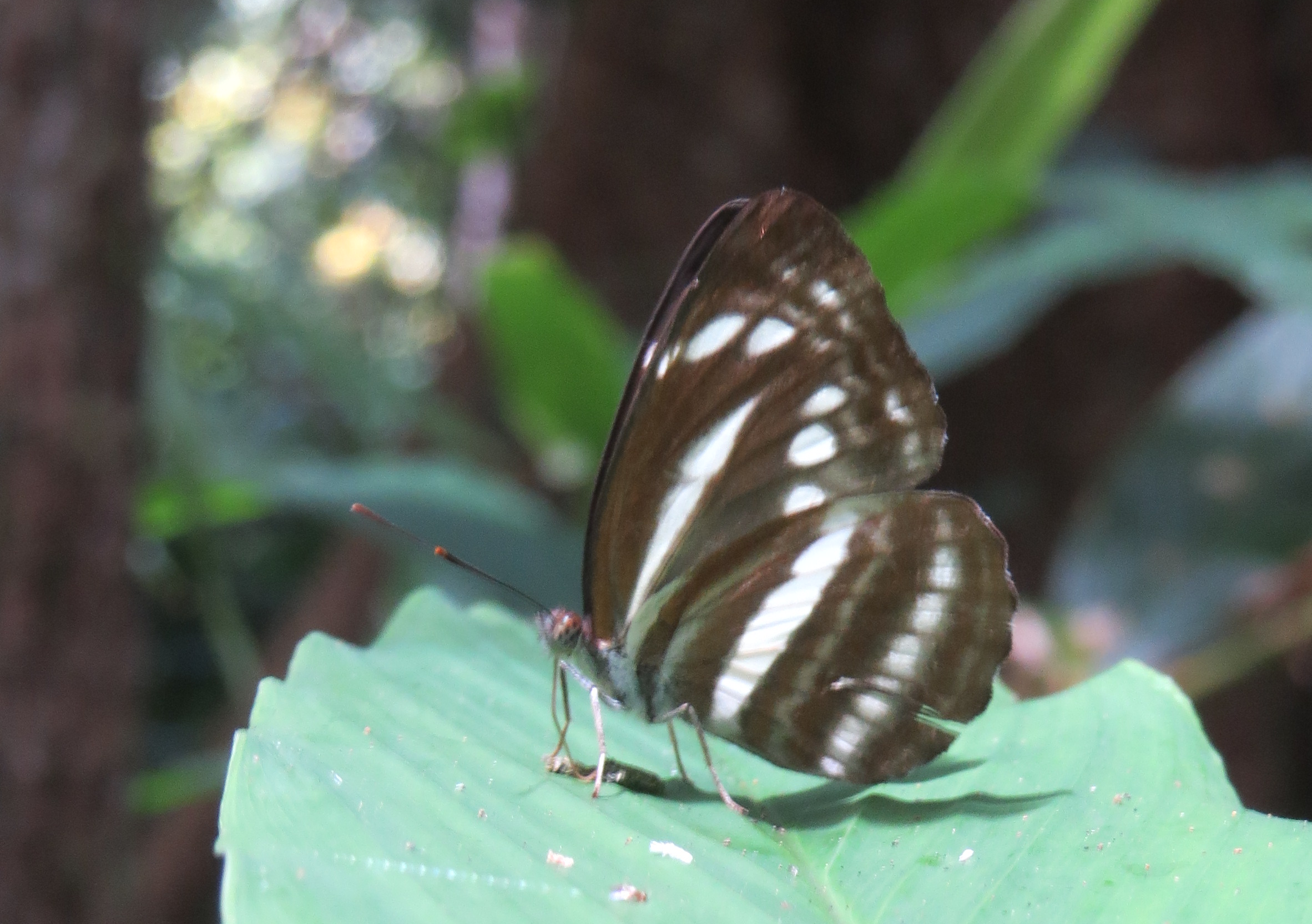
Sullied sailer, Neptis clinia

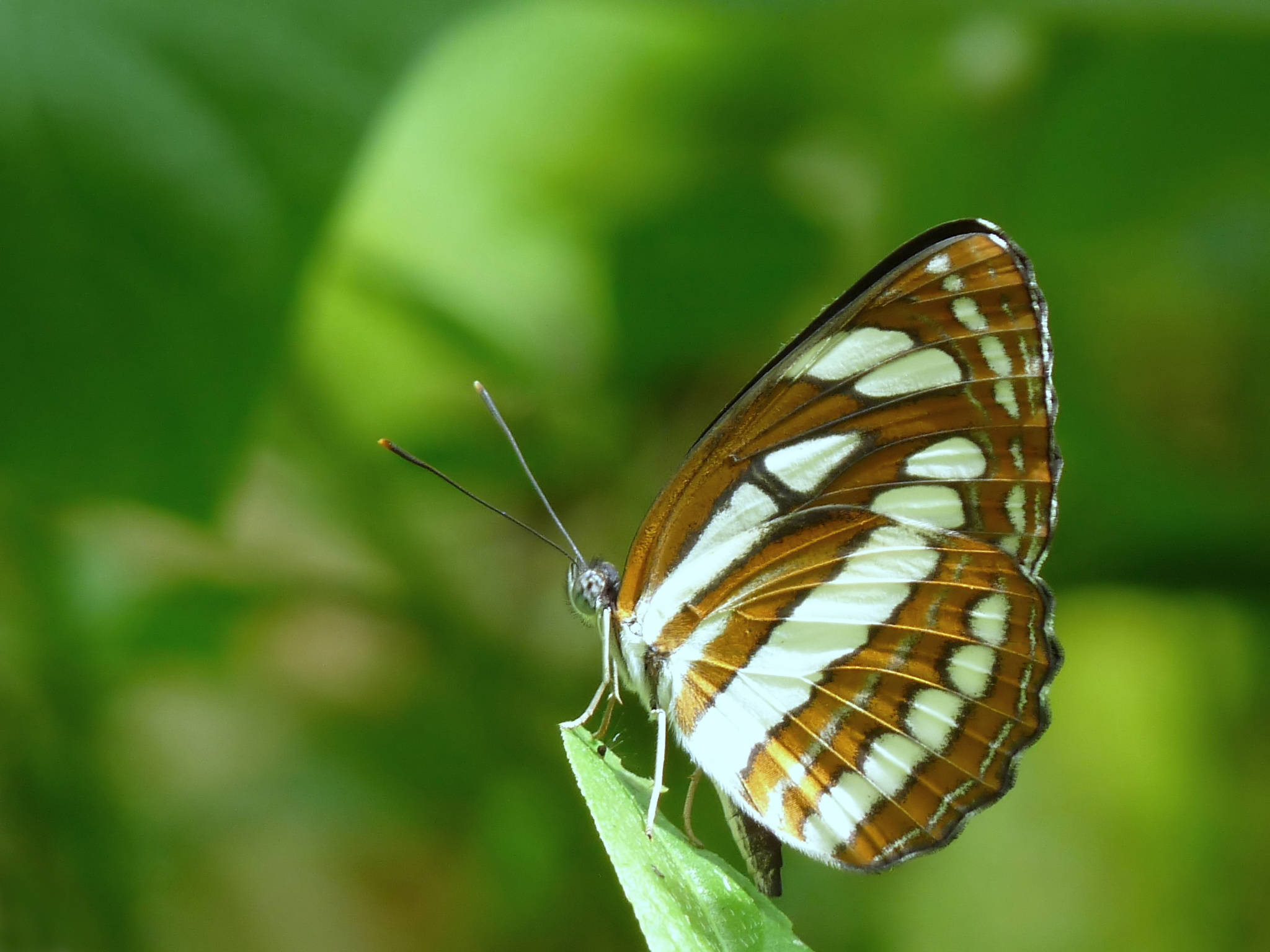
Common sailer, Neptis hylas

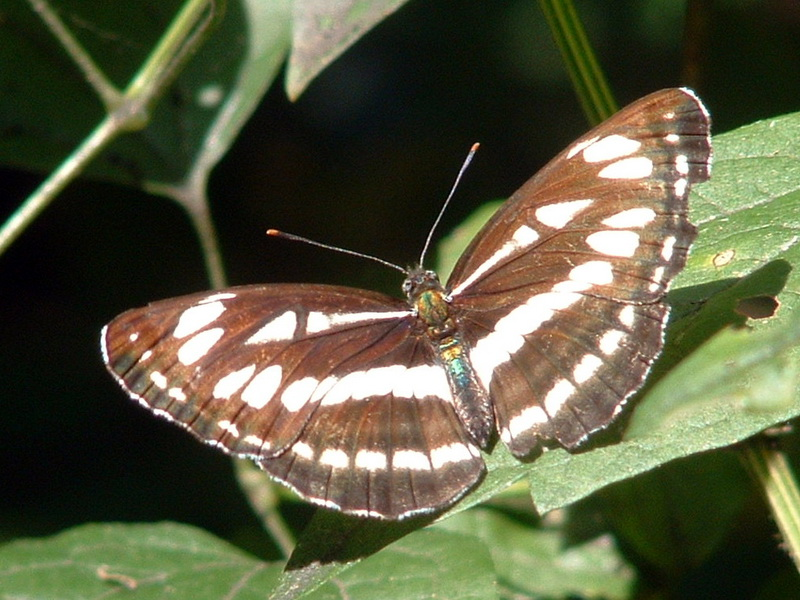
Pallas's sailer, Neptis sappho

==== Neptini ====
| Common name | Binomial name | Subspecies (in India) | Comments |
|---|---|---|---|
| Knight | Lebadea martha | 1 | |
| Assamese lascar | Pantoporia assamica | | |
| Baby lascar | Pantoporia aurelia | 1 | |
| Tytler's lascar | Pantoporia bieti | 1 | Schedule 2 |
| Common lascar | Pantoporia hordonia | 2 | |
| Perak lascar | Pantoporia paraka | 1 | |
| Extra lascar | Pantoporia sandaka | 2 | |
| Dark sailer | Lasippa monata | | |
| Burmese sailer | Lasippa tiga | 1 | |
| Yellowjack sailer | Lasippa viraja | 3 | Schedule 2 |
| Yellow sailer | Neptis ananta | 2 | |
| Variegated sailer | Neptis armandia | 2 | Schedule 2 |
| Eliot's sailer | Neptis capnodes | 1 | |
| Plain sailer | Neptis cartica | 1 | |
| Sullied sailer | Neptis clinia | 4 | Schedule 2 |
| Chinese yellow sailer | Neptis cydippe | 1 | Schedule 2 |
| Dingiest sailer | Neptis harita | 1 | |
| Common sailer | Neptis hylas | 5 | |
| Dark dingy sailer | Neptis ilira | 1 | |
| Chestnut-streaked sailer | Neptis jumbah | 2 | Schedule 2 |
| Spotted sailer | Neptis magadha | 1 | |
| Himalayan sailer | Neptis mahendra | 1 | |
| Pale hockeystick sailer | Neptis manasa | 1 | Schedule 2 |
| Small yellow sailer | Neptis miah | 2 | |
| Manipur yellow sailer | Neptis namba | 1 | |
| Broadstick sailer | Neptis narayana | 2 | Schedule 2 |
| Less rich sailer | Neptis nashona | 1 | |
| Nata sailer | Neptis nata | 4 | |
| Naga hockeystick sailer | Neptis nemorum | 1 | |
| Hockeystick sailer | Neptis nycteus | 1 | Schedule 1 |
| Long-streak sailer | Neptis philyra | 1 | Subspecies not named |
| Dingy sailer | Neptis pseudovikasi | | |
| Great yellow sailer | Neptis radha | 1 | Schedule 2 |
| Broad-banded sailer | Neptis sankara | 2 | Schedule 2 |
| Pallas's sailer | Neptis sappho | 1 | |
| Creamy sailer | Neptis soma | 3 | Schedule 2 |
| Pale green sailer | Neptis zaida | 3 | Schedule 2 |
| Great hockeystick sailer | Phaedyma aspasia | 1 | Schedule 1 |
| Short-banded sailer | Phaedyma columella | 3 | Schedule 2 |

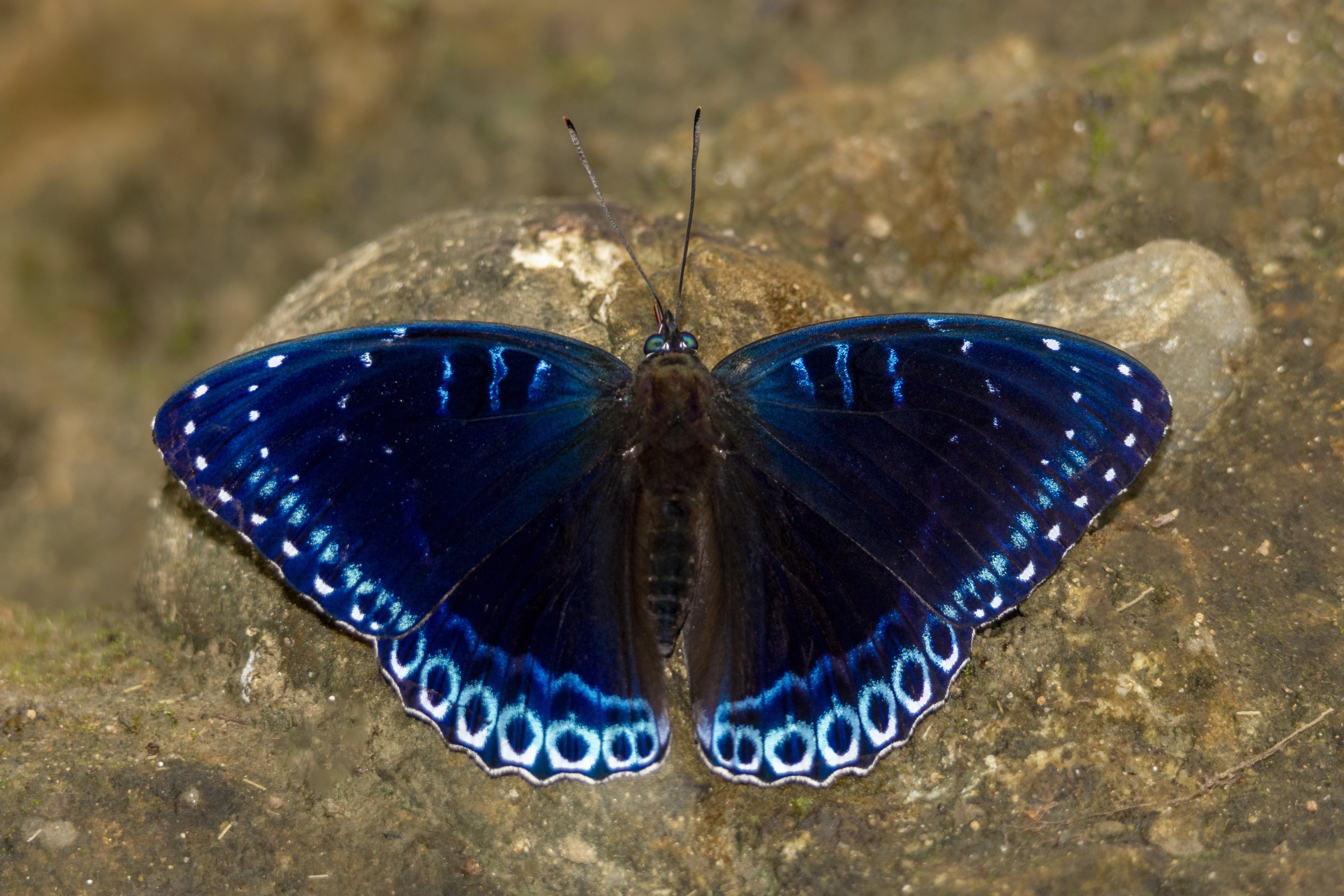
Popinjay, Stibochiona nicea

=== Pseudergolinae ===
| Common name | Binomial name | Subspecies (in India) | Comments |
|---|---|---|---|
| Tabby | Pseudergolis wedah | 1 | |
| Constable | Dichorragia nesimachus | 1 | |
| Popinjay | Stibochiona nicea | 1 | |

=== Biblidinae ===
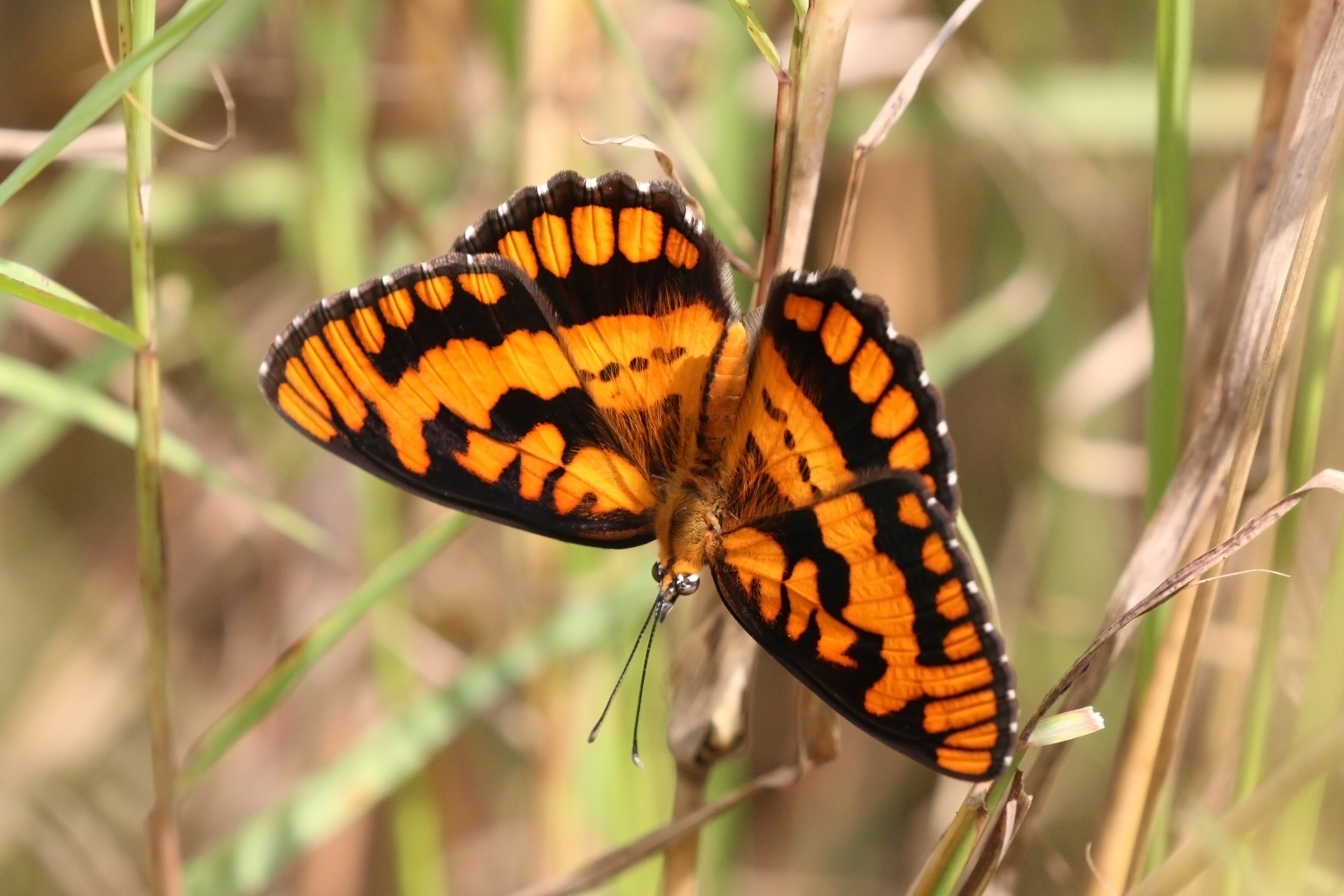
Joker, Byblia ilithyia

==== Biblidini ====
| Common name | Binomial name | Subspecies (in India) | Comments |
|---|---|---|---|
| Angled castor | Ariadne ariadne | 2 | |
| Common castor | Ariadne merione | 2 | |
| Banded dandy | Laringa horsfieldii | 1 | |
| Joker | Byblia ilithyia | | |

=== Apaturinae ===
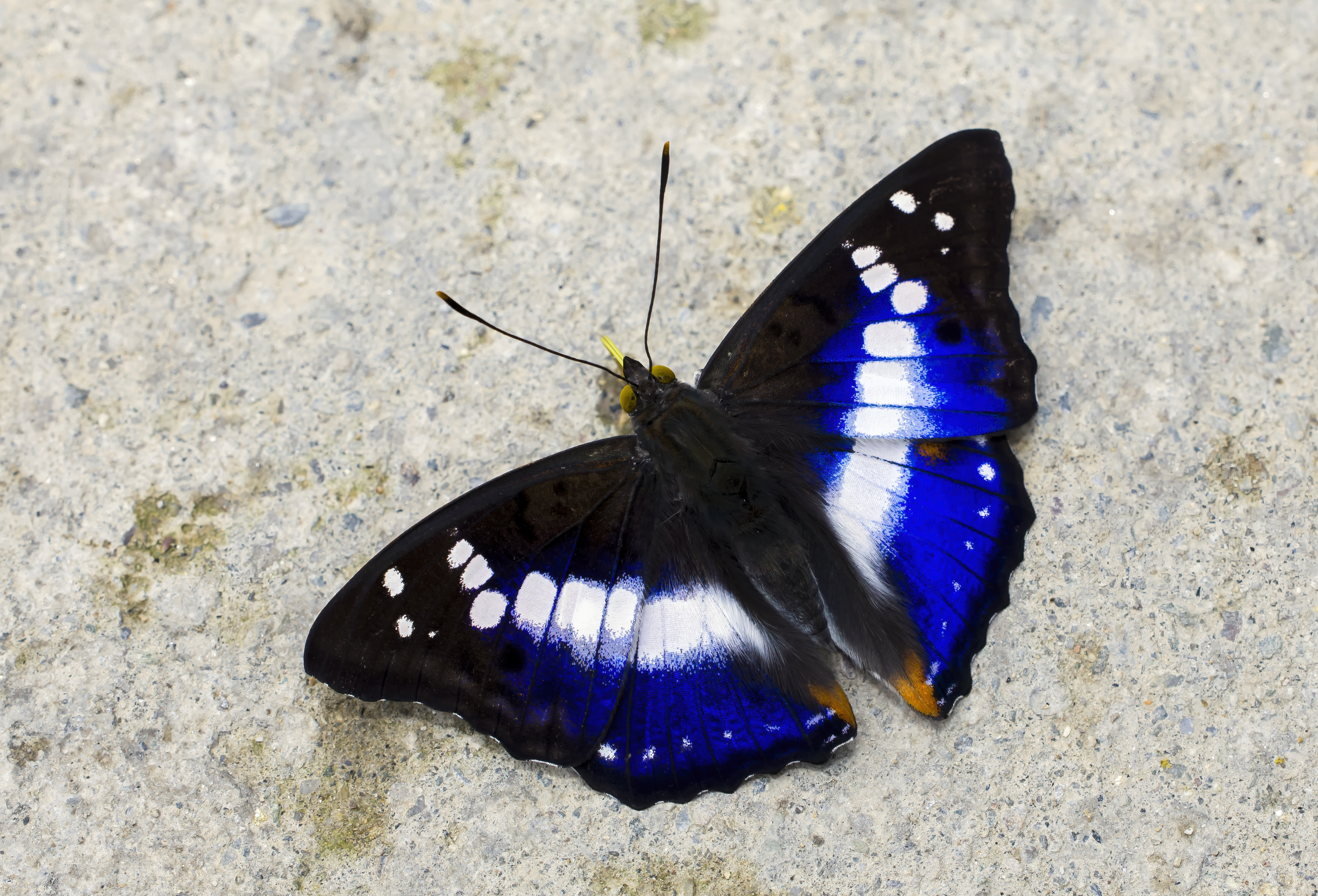
Indian purple emperor, Mimathyma ambica

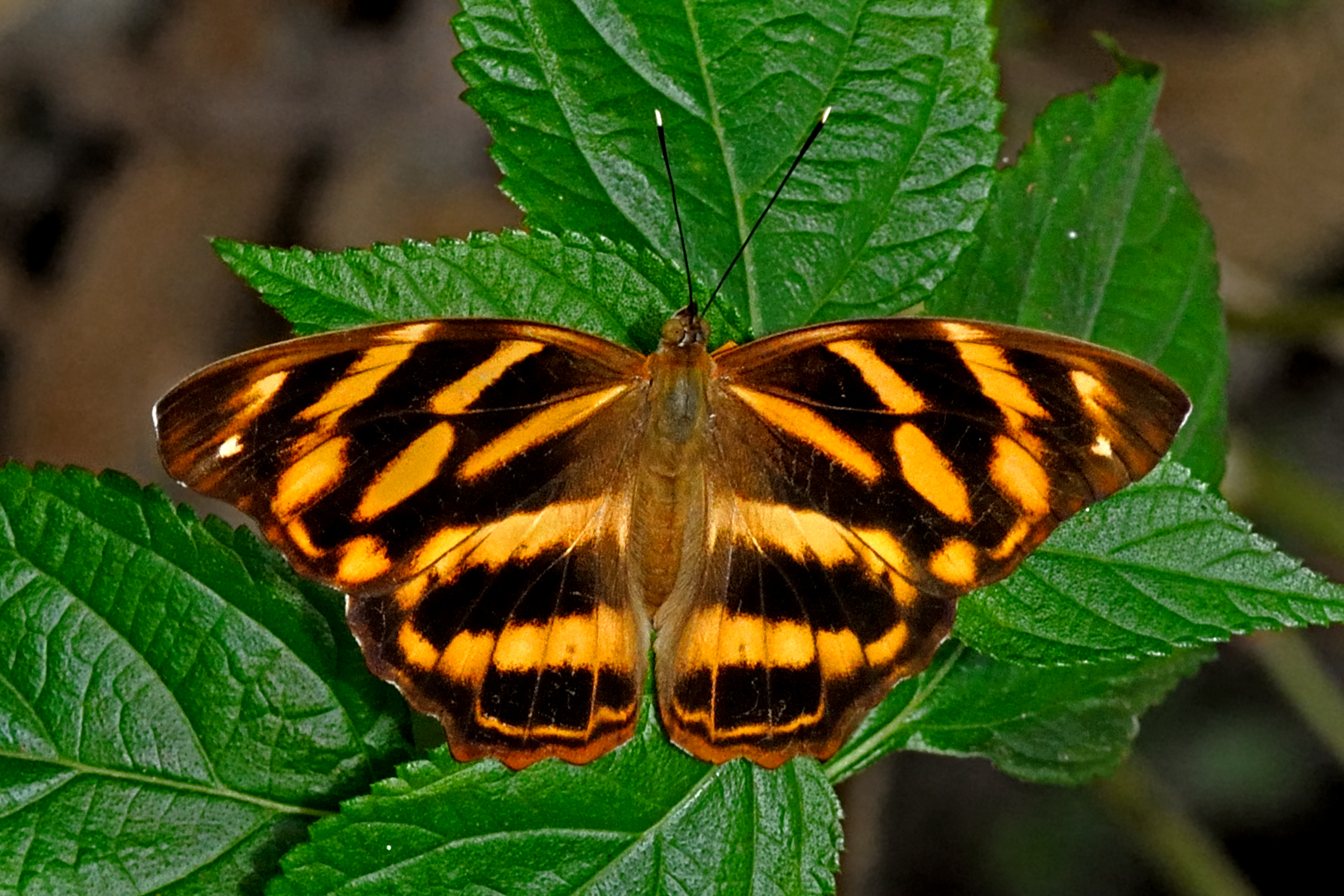
Pasha, Herona marathus

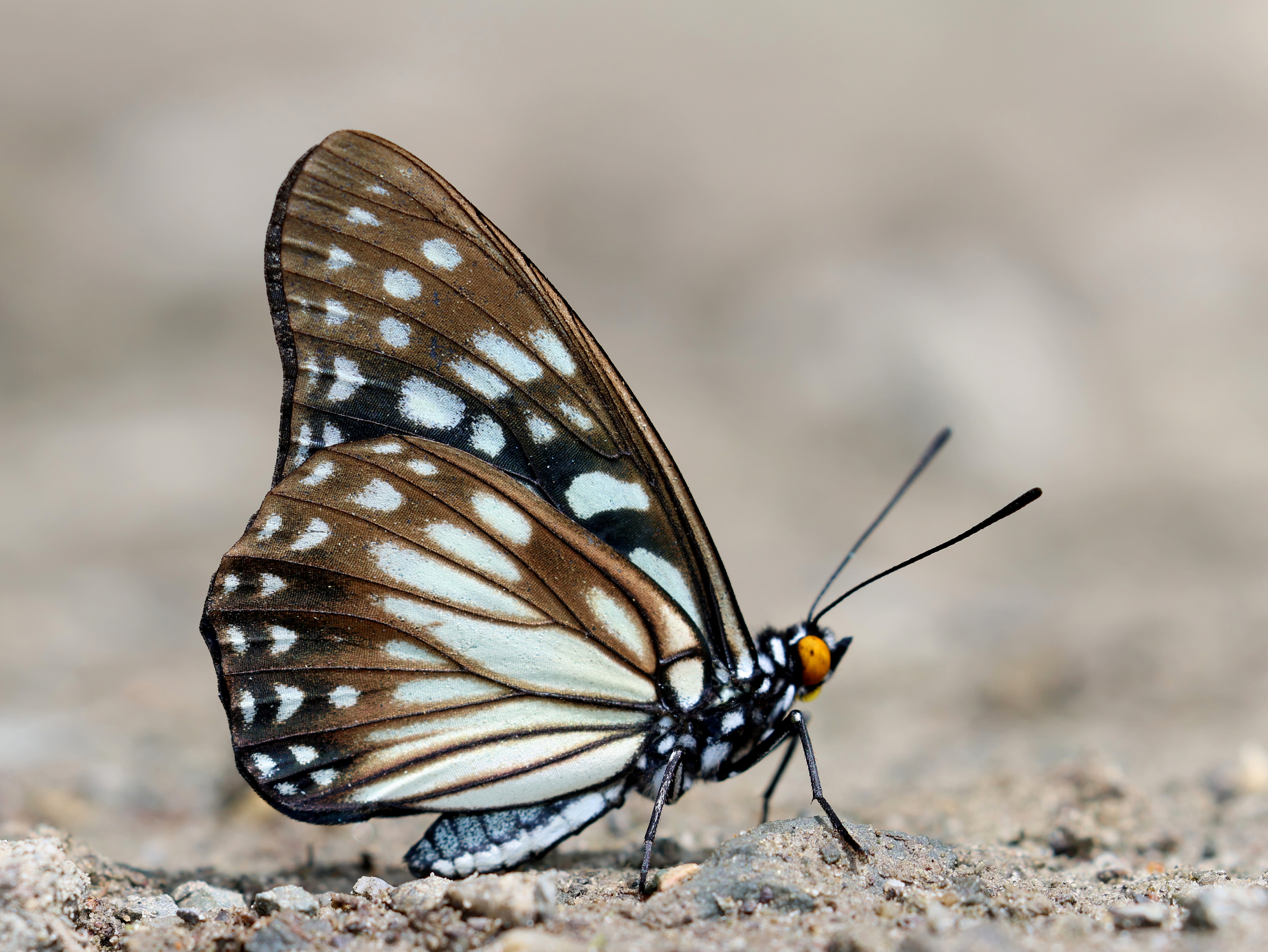
Siren, Hestina persimilis

==== Apaturini ====
| Common name | Binomial name | Subspecies (in India) | Comments |
|---|---|---|---|
| Indian purple emperor | Mimathyma ambica | 1 | |
| Restricted purple emperor | Mimathyma bhavana | | |
| Sergeant emperor | Mimathyma chevana | 1 | Schedule 2 |
| Chitral emperor | Mimathyma chitralensis | | |
| Circe | Mimathyma nama | | |
| Naga emperor | Chitoria naga | | |
| Sordid emperor | Chitoria sordida | 1 | Schedule 2 |
| Tawny emperor | Chitoria ulupi | 1 | Schedule 1 |
| Golden emperor | Dilipa morgiana | | Schedule 1 |
| Tytler's emperor | Eulaceura manipuriensis | | Schedule 1 |
| Black prince | Rohana parisatis | 2 | |
| Brown prince | Rohana parvata | | Schedule 2 |
| Elusive prince | Rohana tonkiniana | 1 | |
| Painted courtesan | Euripus consimilis | 2 | Schedule 2 |
| Courtesan | Euripus nyctelius | 1 | Schedule 2 |
| White emperor | Helcyra hemina | 1 | Schedule 1 |
| Pasha | Herona marathus | 2 | Schedule 2 |
| Scarce siren | Hestina nicevillei | 2 | Schedule 1 |
| Siren | Hestina persimilis | 1 | Schedule 2 |
| Empress | Sasakia funebris | 1 | Schedule 1 |
| Eastern courtier | Sephisa chandra | 1 | Schedule 1 |
| Western courtier | Sephisa dichroa | | |

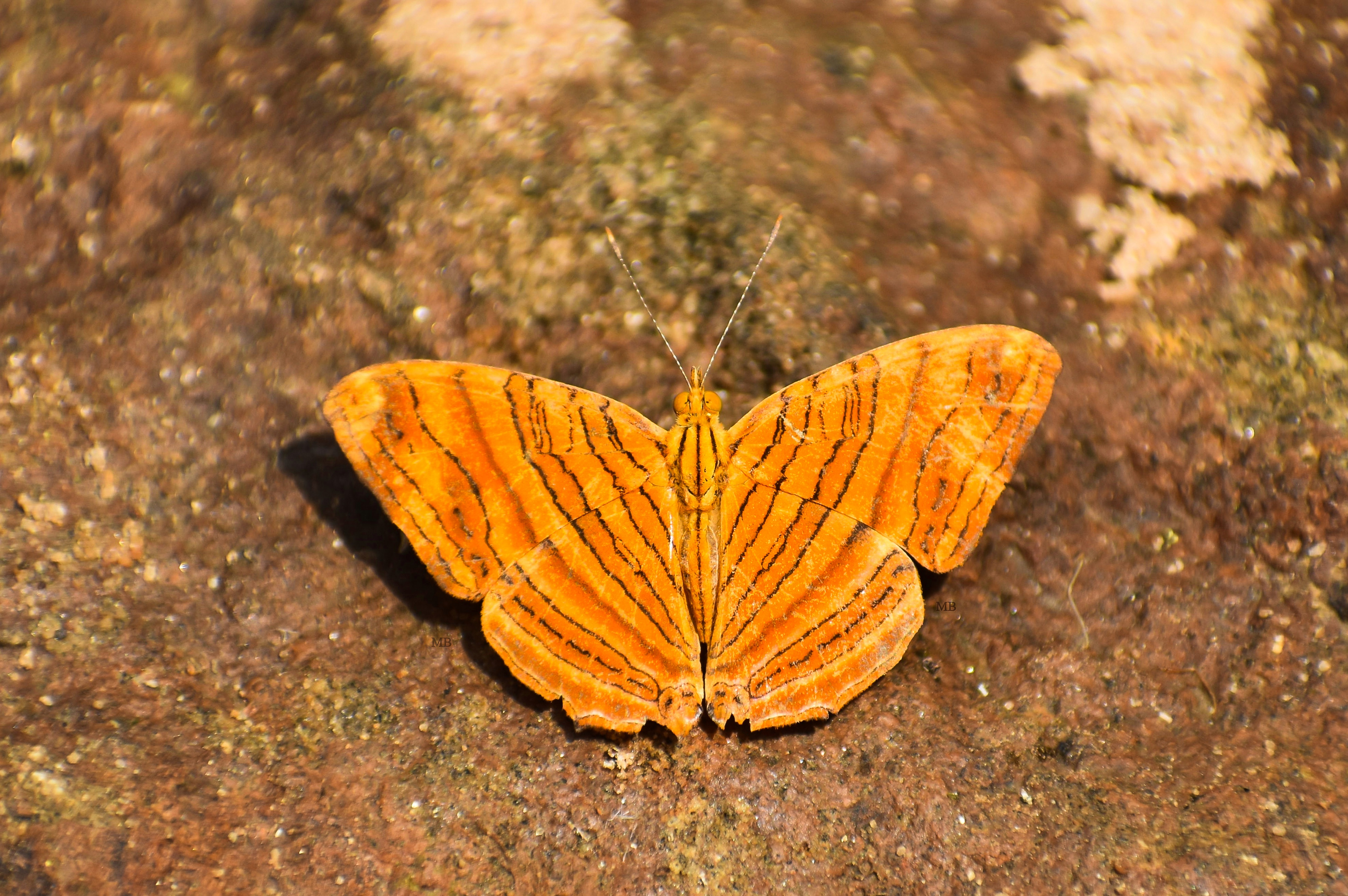
Wavy maplet, Chersonesia intermedia

=== Cyrestinae ===
| Common name | Binomial name | Subspecies (in India) | Comments |
|---|---|---|---|
| Marbled map | Cyrestis cocles | 1 | Schedule 2 |
| Nicobar map | Cyrestis tabula | | Endemic |
| Common map | Cyrestis thyodamas | 4 | |
| Wavy maplet | Chersonesia intermedia | 1 | Schedule 2 |
| Common maplet | Chersonesia risa | 1 | |

=== Nymphalinae ===
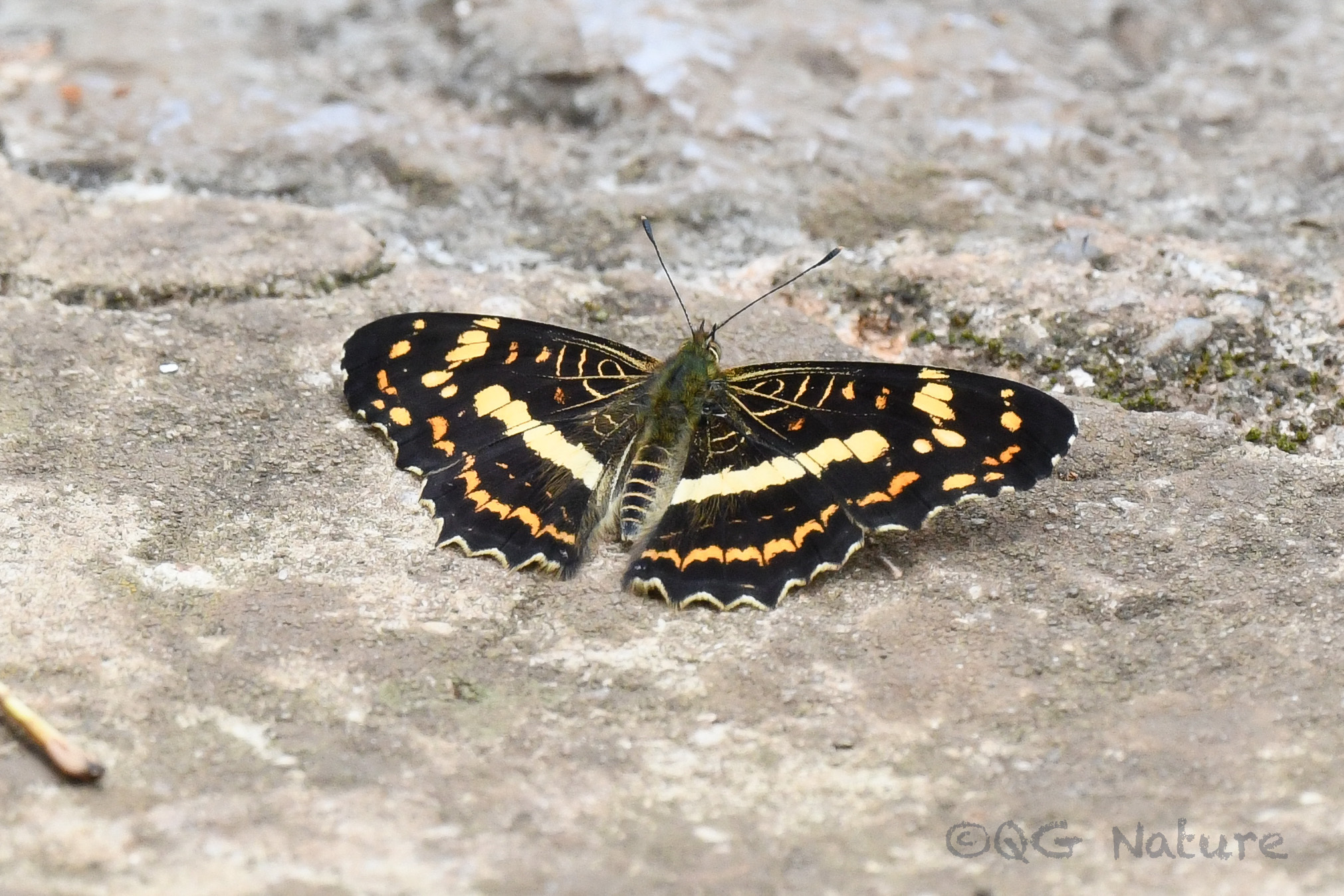
Mongol, Araschnia prorsoides

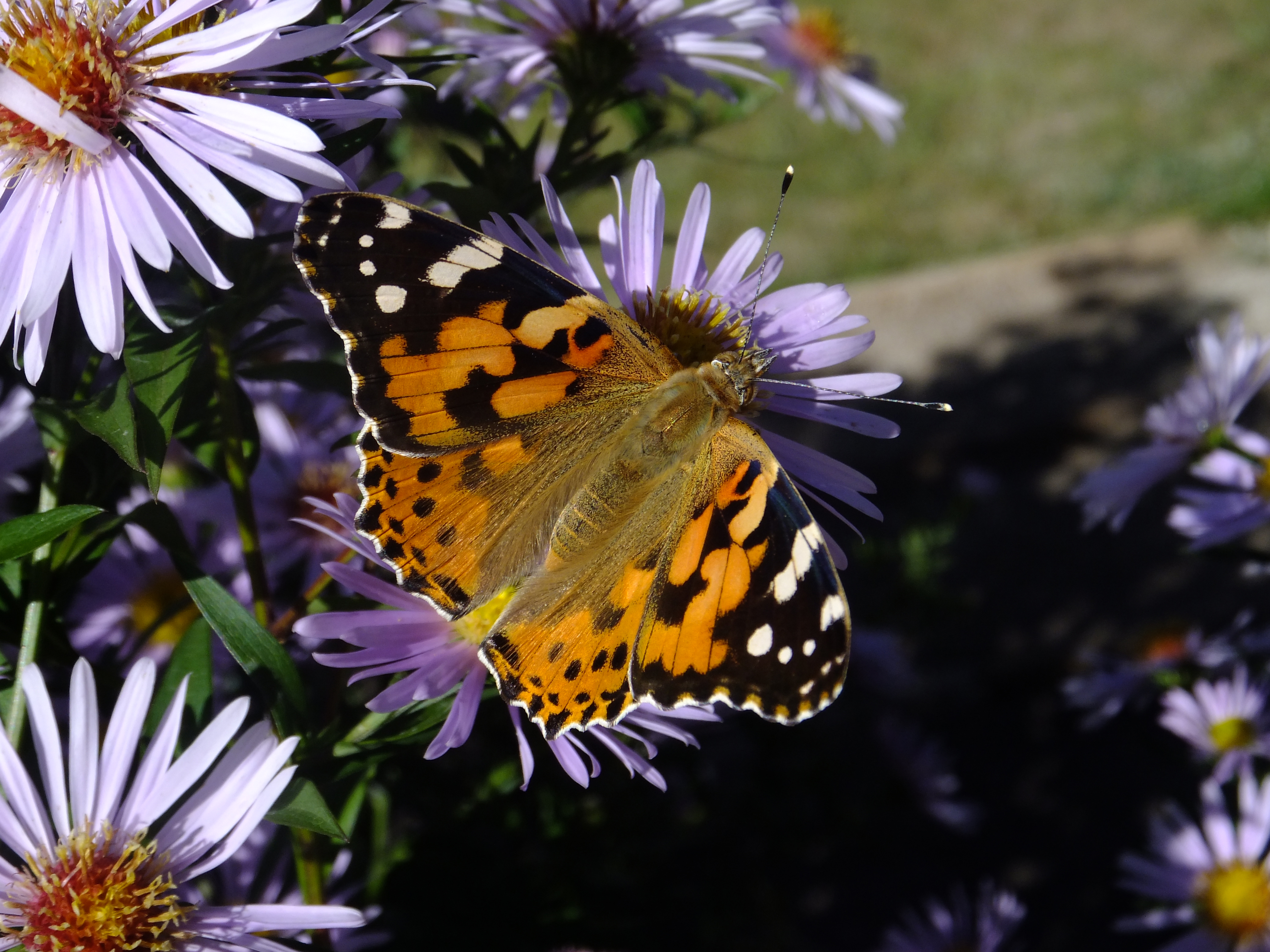
Painted lady, Vanessa cardui

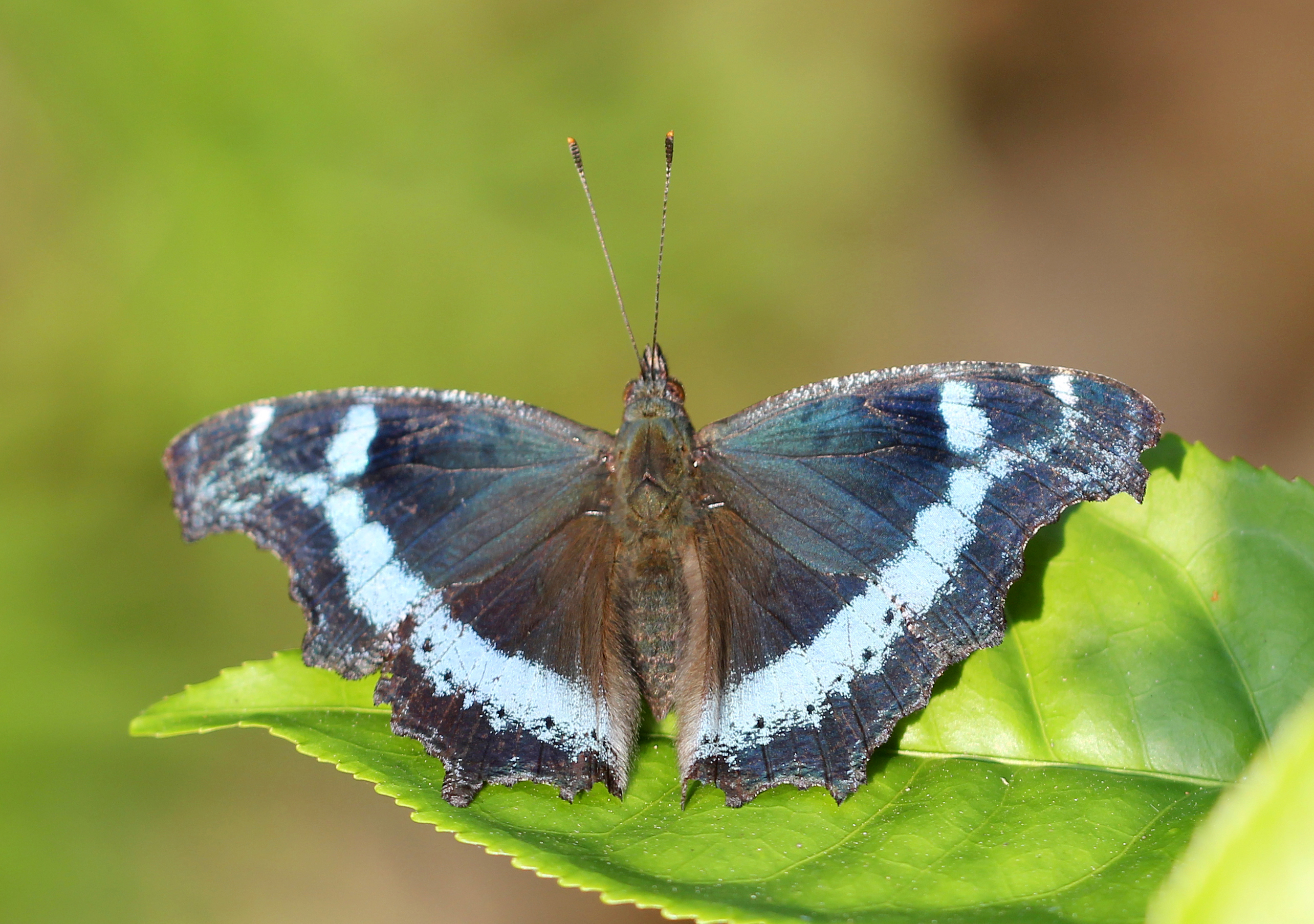
Blue admiral, Nymphalis canace

==== Nymphalini ====
| Common name | Binomial name | Subspecies (in India) | Comments |
|---|---|---|---|
| Mongol | Araschnia prorsoides | 1 | Schedule 2 |
| Himalayan jester | Symbrenthia brabira | 1 | |
| Naga jester | Symbrenthia doni | | |
| Spotted jester | Symbrenthia hypselis | 1 | |
| Common jester | Symbrenthia lilaea | 1 | |
| Bluetail jester | Symbrenthia niphanda | | Schedule 2 |
| Scarce jester | Symbrenthia silana | | Schedule 1 |
| Red admiral | Vanessa atalanta | 1 | |
| Painted lady | Vanessa cardui | | |
| Indian red admiral | Vanessa indica | 2 | |
| Comma | Nymphalis c-album | 1 | Schedule 2 |
| Blue admiral | Nymphalis canace | 1 | |
| Indian tortoiseshell | Nymphalis caschmirensis | 2 | |
| Comma tortoiseshell | Nymphalis l-album | 1 | Schedule 2 |
| Ladakh tortoiseshell | Nymphalis ladakensis | | |
| Blackleg tortoiseshell | Nymphalis polychloros | | |
| Mountain tortoiseshell | Nymphalis rizana | | |
| Pamir comma | Nymphalis undina | | |
| Large tortoiseshell | Nymphalis xanthomelas | 1 | |

==== Rhinopalpini ====
| Common name | Binomial name | Subspecies (in India) | Comments |
|---|---|---|---|
| Wizard | Rhinopalpa polynice | 1 | Schedule 2 |

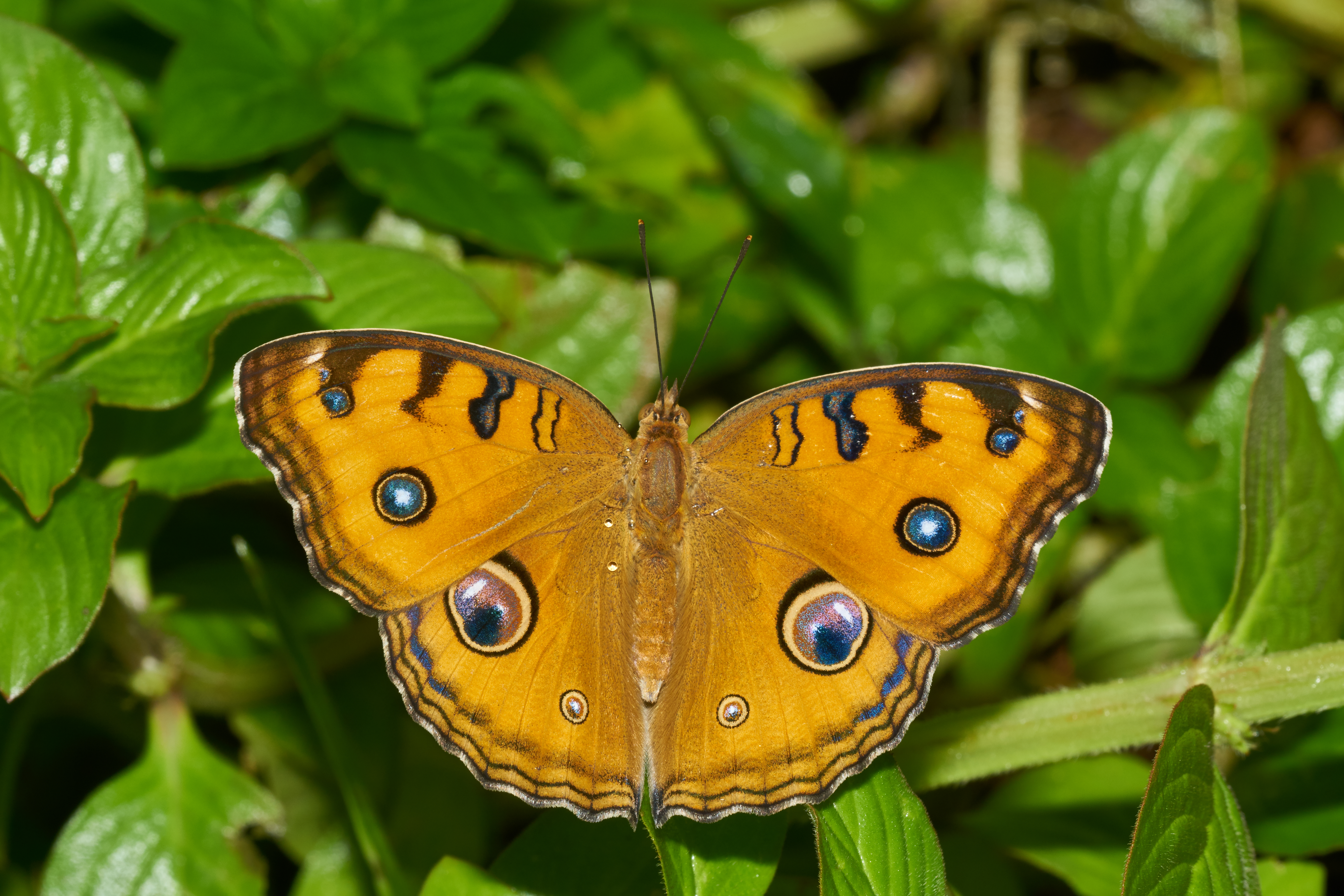
Peacock pansy, Junonia almana

==== Junoniini ====
| Common name | Binomial name | Subspecies (in India) | Comments |
|---|---|---|---|
| Peacock pansy | Junonia almana | 2 | |
| Grey pansy | Junonia atlites | 1 | |
| Yellow pansy | Junonia hierta | 1 | |
| Chocolate pansy | Junonia iphita | 2 | |
| Lemon pansy | Junonia lemonias | 1 | |
| Blue pansy | Junonia orithya | 1 | |
| Lurcher | Yoma sabina | 1 | |
| Malayan eggfly | Hypolimnas anomala | 1 | |
| Great eggfly | Hypolimnas bolina | 1 | |
| Danaid eggfly | Hypolimnas misippus | | Schedule 2 |

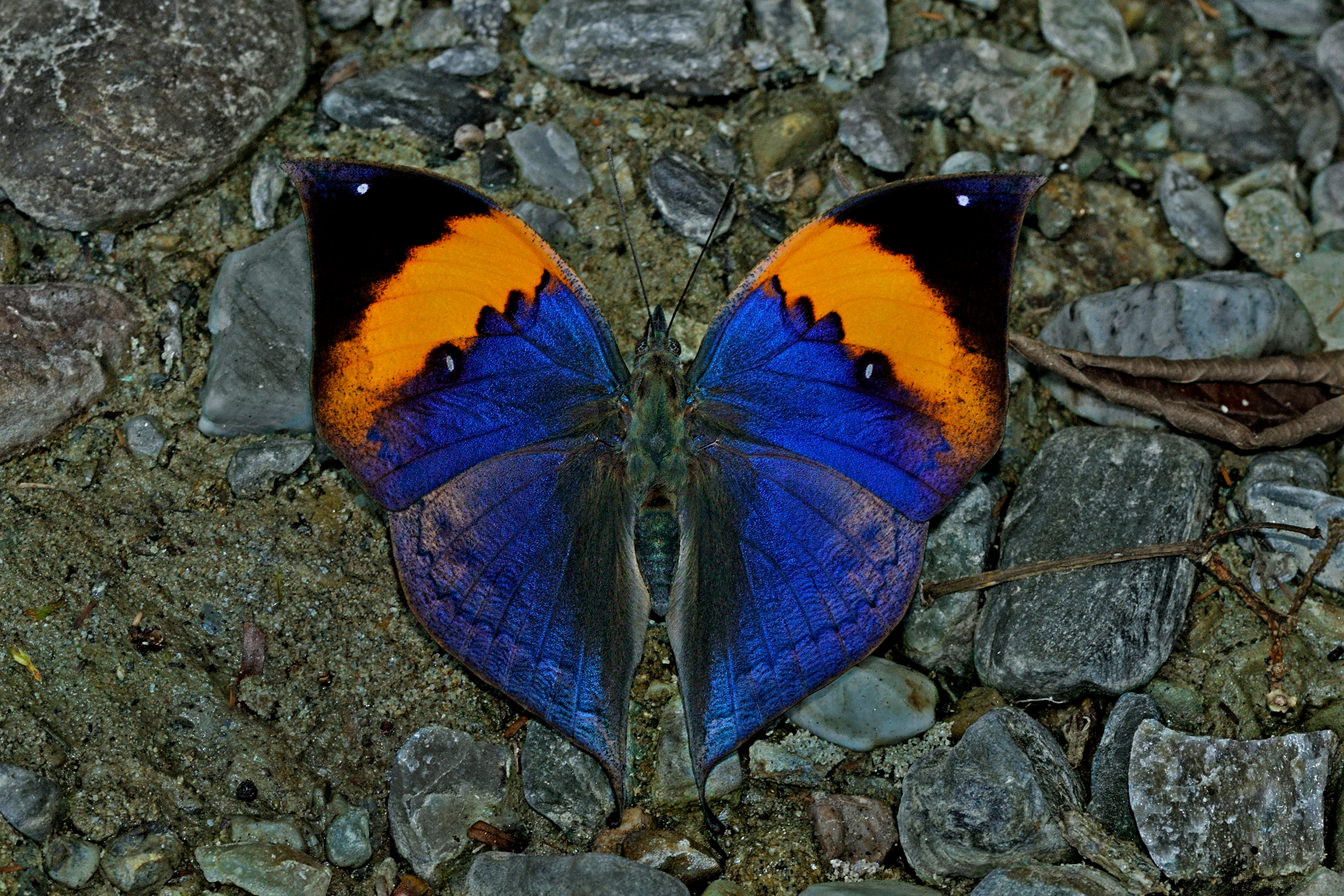
Orange oakleaf, Kallima inachus

==== Kallimini ====
| Common name | Binomial name | Subspecies (in India) | Comments |
|---|---|---|---|
| Andaman oakleaf | Kallima albofasciata | | Schedule 2, Endemic |
| Southern blue oakleaf | Kallima horsfieldii | | Schedule 2, Endemic |
| Orange oakleaf | Kallima inachus | 2 | |
| Cryptic oakleaf | Kallima incognita | | |
| Scarce blue oakleaf | Kallima knyvettii | | Schedule 2 |

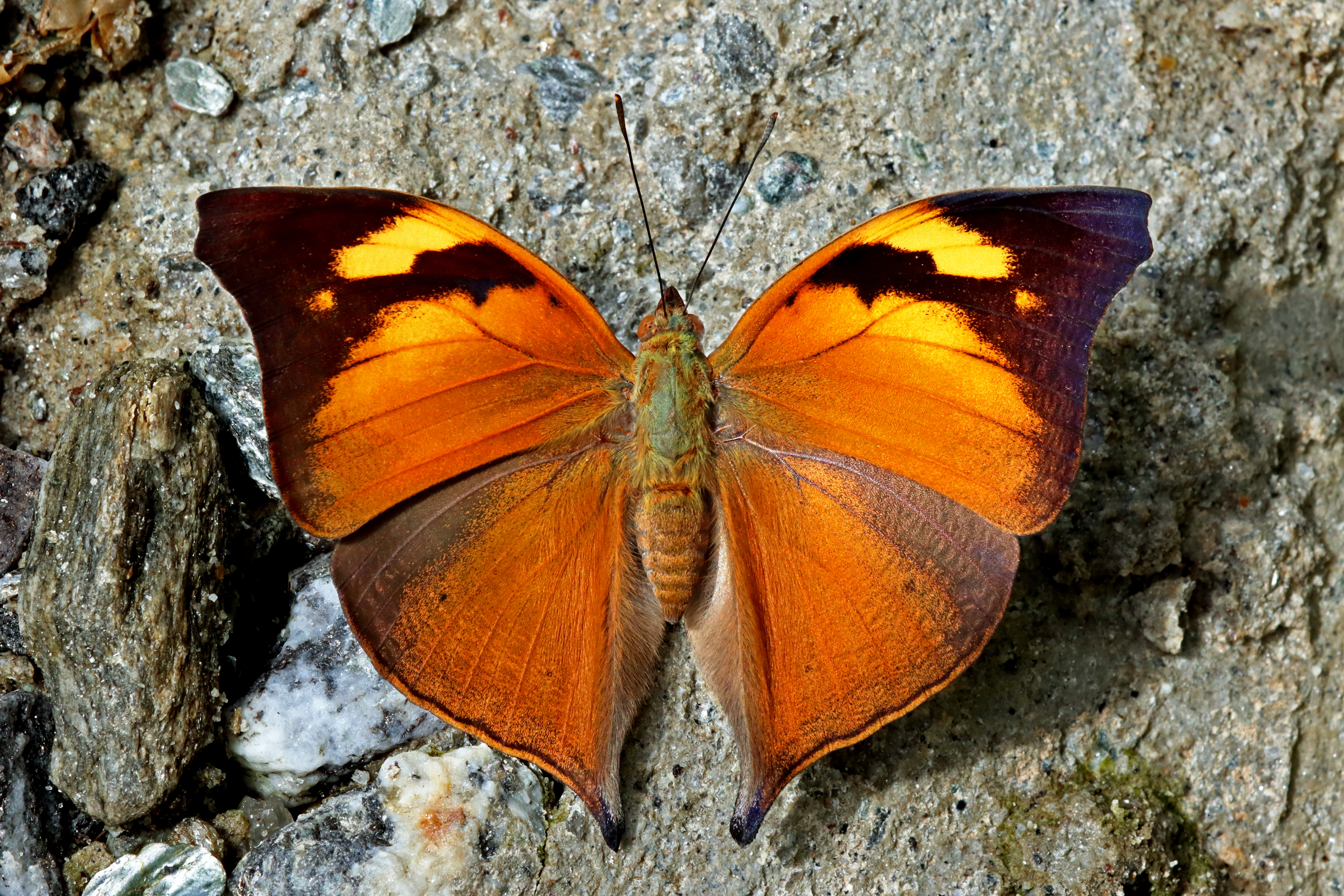
Autumn leaf, Doleschallia bisaltide

==== Doleschalliaini ====
| Common name | Binomial name | Subspecies (in India) | Comments |
|---|---|---|---|
| Autumn leaf | Doleschallia bisaltide | 3 | Schedule 2 |

==== Melitaeini ====
| Common name | Binomial name | Subspecies (in India) | Comments |
|---|---|---|---|
| Tytler's fritillary | Melitaea balbina | | |
| Chitral fritillary | Melitaea chitralensis | | |
| Fiery fritillary | Melitaea fergana | | |
| Pamir fritillary | Melitaea mixta | 1 | |
| Tien-Shan fritillary | Melitaea pallas | | |
| Lesser spotted fritillary | Melitaea robertsi | | |
| Shandur fritillary | Melitaea shandura | | |
| Blackvein fritillary | Melitaea sindura | 5 | |

== Regional lists ==
India has 28 states and 8 union territories. The list of butterflies for each state can be found using the index below:

=== States ===
- Andhra Pradesh
- Arunachal Pradesh
- Assam
- Bihar
- Chhattisgarh
- Goa
- Gujarat
- Haryana
- Himachal Pradesh
- Jharkhand
- Karnataka
- Kerala
- Madhya Pradesh
- Maharashtra
- Manipur
- Meghalaya
- Mizoram
- Nagaland
- Odisha
- Punjab
- Rajasthan
- Sikkim
- Tamil Nadu
- Telangana
- Tripura
- Uttar Pradesh
- Uttarakhand
- West Bengal

=== Union territories ===
- Andaman and Nicobar Islands
- Chandigarh
- Dadra and Nagar Haveli and Daman and Diu
- Delhi
- Jammu and Kashmir
- Ladakh
- Lakshadweep
- Pondicherry

=== Non state-wise lists ===
The following non state-wise lists of butterflies can be found using the index below:

- List of butterflies of the Western Ghats
