= List of butterflies of China (Nymphalidae) =

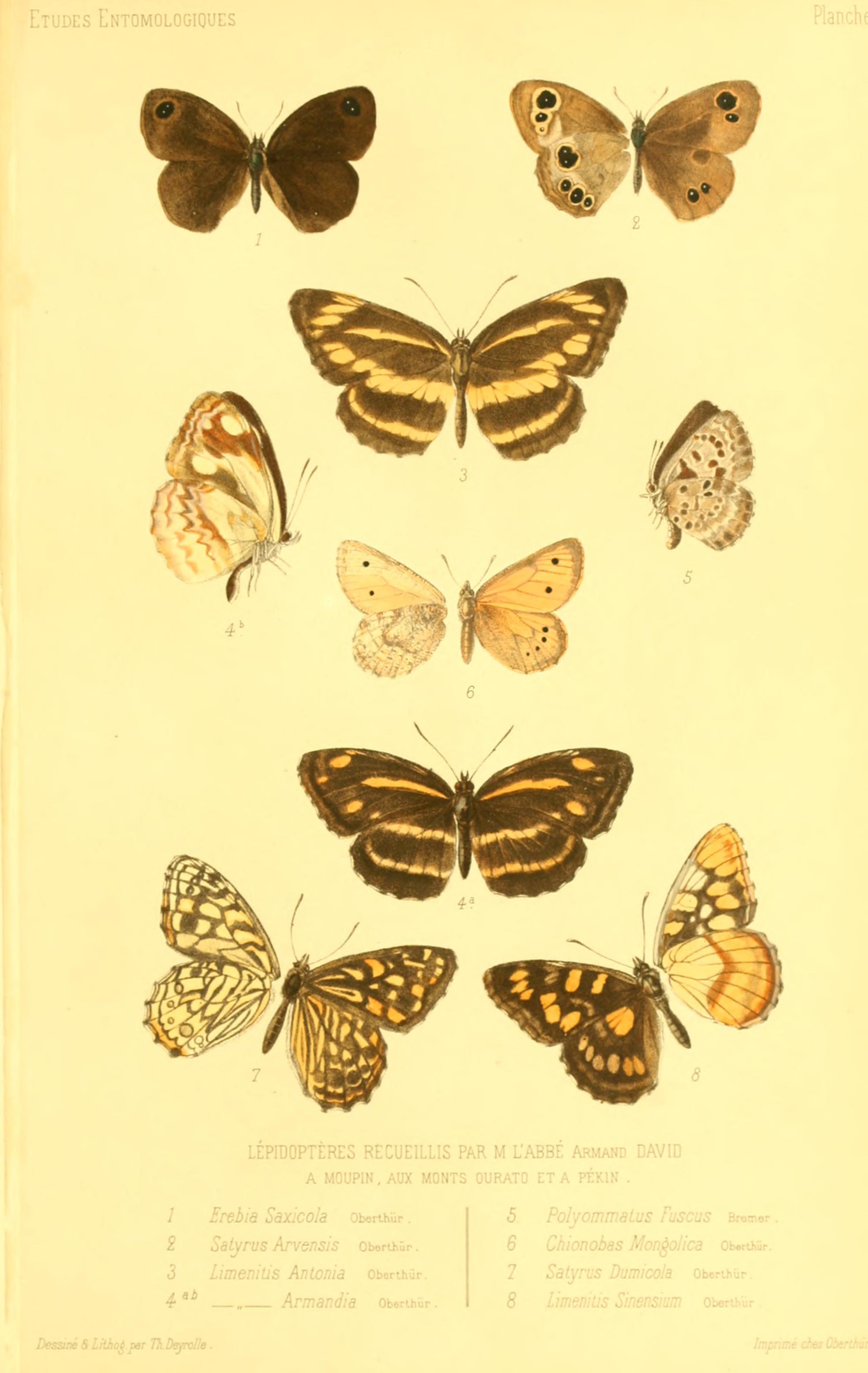
Nymphalidae in Charles Oberthür's Études d'entomologie: Lépidoptères de Chine (1876)

This is a list of the butterflies of China belonging to the family Nymphalidae and an index to the species articles. This forms part of the full list of butterflies of China. 1,159 species or subspecies of Nymphalidae are recorded from China.

== Nymphalidae ==
genus: Abrota

- Abrota ganga (Moore, 1857)

A. g. pratti Leech, 1891 Sichuan, Yunnan
A. g. formosana Fruhstorfer, 1909 Taiwan
A. g. flavina Mell, 1923 Guangdong
A. g. riubaensis Yoshino, 1997 Shaanxi

genus: Acraea

- Acraea issoria (Hübner, 1819)

A. i. sordice (Fruhstorfer, 1914) Yunnan

- Acraea terpsicore (Linnaeus, 1758)

genus: Acropolis

- Acropolis thalia (Leech, 1891)

genus: Aemona

- Aemona amathusia (Hewitson, 1867)

A. a. oberthueri (Stichel, 1906) West China

- Aemona lena Atkinson, 1871 Yunnan

genus: Aglais

- Aglais urticae (Linnaeus, 1758)

A. u. eximia (Sheljuzhko, 1919) Amur, Ussuri
A. u. stoetzneri (Kleinschmidt, 1929) Sichuan
A. u. kansuensis (Kleinschmidt, 1940) Northwest China
A. u. chinensis Leech, 1893 China
A. u. connexa (Butler, [1882]) South Ussuri

- Aglais io (Linnaeus, 1758)

genus: Aldania

- Aldania raddei (Bremer, 1861)
- Aldania ilos Fruhstorfer, 1909 Northeast China

A. i. ilos Fruhstorfer, 1909 Amur, Ussuri
A. i. nise Sugiyama, 1993 West China

- Aldania themis (Leech, 1890) China, Ussuri

A. t. themis (Leech, 1890) Hubei, Sichuan, Gansu, Shaanxi
A. t. muri (Eliot, 1969) North China
A. t. neotibetana (Huang, 1998) Tibet

- Aldania thisbe (Ménétriés, 1859) Amur, Ussuri, Central China, Northeast China

A. t. obscurior (Oberthür, 1906) Sichuan, Fujian
A. t. dilutior (Oberthür, 1906) Yunnan

- Aldania deliquata (Stichel, [1909])

A. d. tshetverikovi (Kurentzov, 1936) Amur, Ussuri

- Aldania yunnana (Oberthür, 1906) Yunnan
- Aldania imitans (Oberthür, 1897) Yunnan

genus: Algia

- Algia fasciata (C. & R. Felder, 1860)

A. f. formosana (Matsumura, 1929) Taiwan

genus: Amathuxidia

- Amathuxidia morishitai Chou & Gu, 1994 Hainan

genus: Apatura

- Apatura iris (Linnaeus, 1758)

A. i. bieti Oberthür, 1885 Tibet, West China, Central China
A. i. amurensis Stichel, [1909] Amur, Ussuri

- Apatura ilia ([Schiffermüller], 1775)

A. i. praeclara Bollow, 1930 Amur, Ussuri
A. i. phaedra Leech, 1892
A. i. szechwanensis Le Moult, 1947
A. i. yunnana Mell, 1952 Yunnan
A. i. huapingensis Yoshino, 1998 Guangxi

- Apatura metis Freyer, 1829

A. m. heijona Matsumura, 1928 Korea, Amur, Ussuri

- Apatura laverna Leech, 1893

A. l. laverna Leech, 1893 Sichuan, Shaanxi
A. l. yunlingensis Yoshino, 1999 Yunnan

genus: Aphantopus

- Aphantopus hyperantus (Linnaeus, 1758)

A. h. ocellana (Butler, 1882) Amur, Ussuri
A. h. bieti (Oberthür, 1884) Sichuan, North Yunnan
A. h. luti Evans, 1915 Tibet
A. h. abaensis Yoshino, 2003 Sichuan

- Aphantopus maculosa (Leech, 1890)
- Aphantopus arvensis (Oberthür, 1876) West China

A. a. arvensis (Oberthür, 1876) Central China
A. a. deqenensis Li,1995 Yunnan

genus: Araschnia

- Araschnia prorsoides (Blanchard, 1871) West China
- Araschnia levana (Linnaeus, 1758)

A. l. wladimiri Kardakov, 1928 Amur, Ussuri

- Araschnia doris Leech, [1892] West China, Central China
- Araschnia dohertyi Moore, [1899] China, Yunnan
- Araschnia burejana (Bremer, 1861) Tibet, China, Amur
- Araschnia davidis Poujade, 1885 Tibet, West China, Central China
- Araschnia zhangi Chou, 1994 Jiangsu
- Araschnia oreas Leech, [1892] Tibet, West China

genus: Argestina

- Argestina phantasta Goltz, 1938 Yunnan
- Argestina pomena (Evans, 1915)

A. p. shuana (Evans, 1915) Tibet
A. p. chiuna (Bailey, 1935) Tibet

- Argestina inconstans (South, 1913) Tibet
- Argestina irma Evans, 1923 Tibet
- Argestina karta Riley, 1923Tibet
- Argestina nitida Riley, 1923 Tibet
- Argestina waltoni (Elwes, 1906) Tibet

genus: Argynnis

- Argynnis paphia (Linnaeus, 1758)

A. p. neopaphia Fruhstorfer, 1907 Amur
A. p. megalegoria Fruhstorfer, 1907 Sichuan, Yunnan
A. p. argyrophontes Oberthür, 1923 Southwest China

- Argynnis anadyomene C. & R. Felder, 1862

A. a. anadyomene C. & R. Felder, 1862 Central China
A. a. ella Bremer, 1864 Amur, Ussuri

- Argynnis pandora ([Schiffermüller], 1775)

A. p. pasargades Fruhstorfer, 1908 Tian Shan

- Argynnis hyperbius (Linnaeus, 1763) China
- Argynnis laodice (Pallas, 1771)

A. l. fletcheri Watkins, 1924 Amur, Ussuri
A. l. rudra Moore, [1858] Yunnan
A. l. samana Fruhstorfer, 1907 West China
A. l. huochengice (Huang & Murayama, 1992) Xinjiang

- Argynnis kuniga (Chou & Tong, 1994) Zhejiang
- Argynnis ruslana Motschulsky, 1866

A. r. ruslana Motschulsky, 1866 East China Amur, Ussuri

- Argynnis sagana Doubleday, [1847]

A. s. sagana Doubleday, [1847] Northeast China

- Argynnis childreni Gray, 1831 West China, Central China

A. c. childreni Gray, 1831 West China, Central China

- Argynnis zenobia Leech, 1890

A. z. zenobia Leech, 1890 China, Tibet
A. z. penelope Staudinger, [1892] Ussuri

genus: Ariadne

- Ariadne ariadne (Linnaeus, 1763)

A. a. pallidior (Fruhstorfer, 1899) South China, Taiwan
A. a. atternus Moore Hainan

- Ariadne merione (Cramer, [1777])

genus: Aulocera

- Aulocera sybillina (Oberthür, 1890) West China, Tibet
- Aulocera brahminoides Moore, [1896] Tibet
- Aulocera magica (Oberthür, 1886) West China, Tibet
- Aulocera merlina (Oberthür, 1890) Sichuan, Yunnan

A. m. pulcheristriata Huang, 2001 Tibet

- Aulocera padma (Kollar, [1844]) West China
- Aulocera loha Doherty, 1886 Yunnan, Tibet
- Aulocera saraswati (Kollar, [1844])

A. s. chayuensis Huang, 2001 Chayu

- Aulocera swaha (Kollar, [1844])

genus: Athyma

- Athyma pravara Moore, [1858]
- A. p. indosinica Fruhstorfer, 1906 South Yunnan
- Athyma jina Moore, [1858]

A. j. jina Moore, [1858] Yunnan
A. j. sauteri (Fruhstorfer, 1913) Taiwan
A. j. jinoides (Moore, 1898) West China, Central China
A. j. huochengica Huang & Murayama, 1992 Xinjiang
Athyma perius (Linnaeus, 1758)

- A. p. perius (Linnaeus, 1758) South Yunnan
- Athyma asura Moore, [1858]

A. a. baelia (Fruhstorfer, 1908) Taiwan
A. a. elwesi (Leech, 1893) West China, Central China

- Athyma ranga Moore, [1858]

A. r. obsolescens (Fruhstorfer, 1906) South Yunnan

- Athyma eupolia (Murayama & Shimonoya, 1963) Taiwan
- Athyma opalina (Kollar, [1844])

A. o. hirayamai Matsumura, 1935 Taiwan
A. o. constricta Alphéraky, 1889 West China, Central China

- Athyma selenophora (Kollar, [1844])

A. s. leucophryne (Fruhstorfer, 1912) Hainan, Hong Kong
A. s. yui Huang, 1998 Tibet, Metok
A. s. laela (Fruhstorfer, 1908) Taiwan
A. s. latifascia (Talbot, 1936) South Yunnan

- Athyma zeroca Moore, 1872

A. z. galaesus (Fruhstorfer, 1912) South Yunnan
A. z. hishikawai Yoshino, 2001 Guangxi, Guizhou
A. z. whitei (Tytler, 1940)

- Athyma minensis Yoshino, 1997 Fujian

Athyma cama Moore, [1858]
A. c. zoroastres Butler, 1877 Taiwan

- Athyma nefte (Cramer, [1780])

A. n. asita Moore, 1858 South Yunnan
A. n. seitzi (Fruhstorfer, 1906) South China, Hong Kong

- Athyma sulpitia (Cramer, [1779])

A. s. sulpitia (Cramer, [1779]) South China, Hong Kong
A. s. ningpoana C. & R. Felder, 1862 Ningbo
A. s. tricula (Frusthorfer, 1908) Taiwan

- Athyma fortuna Leech, 1889

A. f. diffusa Leech Central China
A. f. guangxiensis Wang, 1994 Guangxi

- Athyma recurva Leech, 1893 West China, Tibet
- Athyma disjuncta Leech, 1890 West China, Central China
- Athyma orientalis Elwes, 1888 Tibet
- Athyma punctata Leech, 1890

A. p. punctata Leech, 1890 West China, Tibet
A. p. zhejiangensis Tong, 1994 Zhejiang

genus: Auzakia

- Auzakia danava (Moore, [1858]) Tibet, West China

A. d. danava (Moore, [1858]) West China, Yunnan, Tibet
A. d. leechi Moore, 1898 Southwest China, West China
A. d. luri (Yoshino, 1997) Fujian

genus: Bassarona

- Bassarona durga (Moore, 1858)
- Bassarona iva (Moore, [1858])

genus: Bhagadatta

- Bhagadatta austenia (Moore, 1872)

B. a. montana (Hall, 1923) South China

genus: Boeberia

- Boeberia parmenio (Böber, 1809) Northeast China, Amur

genus: Boloria

- Boloria napaea Hoffmannsegg, 1804
- Boloria pales ([Schiffermüller], 1775)

B. p. palina (Fruhstorfer, 1904) Sichuan
B. p. eupales (Fruhstorfer, 1903) Tibet
B. p. sifanica (Grum-Grshimailo, 1891) Qinghai, Gansu

- Boloria sipora (Moore, [1875])

B. s. generator (Staudinger, 1886) Tian Shan

- Boloria aquilonaris (Stichel, 1908)

B. a. banghaasi Seitz, [1909] Amur

- Boloria napaea Hoffmannsegg, 1804

genus: Brenthis

- Brenthis ino (Rottemburg, 1775) North China

B. i. amurensis (Staudinger, 1887) Amur
B. i. maxima (Staudinger, 1887) Ussuri
B. i. trachalus (Fruhstorfer, 1917) Tian Shan

- Brenthis hecate ([Schiffermüller], 1775)

B. h. alaica (Staudinger, 1886) Tian Shan

- Brenthis daphne (Bergsträsser, 1780)

B. d. ochroleuca (Fruhstorfer, 1907) Tian Shan, Amur, Ussuri

genus: Calinaga

- Calinaga lhatso Oberthür, 1893

C. l. lhatso Oberthür, 1893 Yunnan
C. l. senseiensis Yoshino, 1997 Shaanxi

- Calinaga buddha Moore, 1857

C. b. brahma Butler, 1885 Yunnan
C. b. formosana Fruhstorfer, 1908 Taiwan
C. b. lactoris Fruhstorfer, 1908 Changyang

- Calinaga buphonas Oberthür, 1920 Yunnan
- Calinaga genestieri Oberthür, 1922 Yunnan
- Calinaga cercyon de Nicéville China
- Calinaga davidis Oberthür West China, Tibet
- Calinaga sudassana Melvill, 1893

C. s. sudassana Melvill, 1893 South Yunnan

- Calinaga funebris Oberthür, 1919
- Calinaga aborica Tytler, 1915

genus: Callarge

- Callarge sagitta (Leech, 1890) Yunnan
- Callarge occidentalis Leech, 1890

genus: Callerebia

- Callerebia baileyi South, 1913 Tibet
- Callerebia polyphemus (Oberthür, 1877)

C. p. polyphemus (Oberthür, 1877) Sichuan
C. p. annadina Watkins, 1927 Yunnan
C. p. confusa Watkins, 1925 West China (Hubei, Hunan, Chongqing, Guizhou)
C. p. ricketti Watkins, 1925 Fujian, Zhejiang, Guangxi

- Callerebia suroia Tytler, 1914 Yunnan, Sichuan
- Callerebia tsirava (Evans, 1915) Tibet
- Callerebia ulfi Huang, 2003 Yunnan
- Callerebia hybrida Butler, 1880

genus: Cethosia

- Cethosia biblis (Drury, [1773])

C. b. biblis (Drury, [1773]) Southwest China
C. b. hainana Fruhstorfer, 1908 Hainan
C. b. phanaroia Fruhstorfer, 1912 Hong Kong

- Cethosia cyane (Drury, [1773])

C. c. euanthes Fruhstorfer, 1912 Yunnan

genus: Chalinga

- Chalinga elwesi (Oberthür, 1884) West China, Tibet
- Chalinga pratti (Leech, 1890)

C. p. pratti (Leech, 1890) Central China, West China
C. p. eximia (Moltrecht, 1909) Ussuri

genus: Charaxes

- Charaxes bernardus (Fabricius, 1793)

C. b. bernardus (Fabricius, 1793) China, Hong Kong
C. b. hierax C. & R. Felder, [1867] Yunnan

- Charaxes kahruba (Moore, [1895]) Yunnan
- Charaxes marmax Westwood, 1847
- Charaxes aristogiton C. & R. Felder, [1867]

genus: Chazara

- Chazara briseis (Linnaeus, 1764) Northwest China

C. b. meridionalis (Staudinger, 1886) Tian Shan

- Chazara heydenreichi (Lederer, 1853) Northwest China, Tian Shan
- Chazara enervata (Alphéraky, 1882) Tian Shan
- Chazara kaufmanni (Erschoff, 1874)

C. k. obscurior (Staudinger, 1887) Tian Shan

- Chazara staudingeri (Bang-Haas, 1882)

C. s. gultschensis Grum-Grshimailo, 1888 Tian Shan

- Chazara persephone (Hübner, [1805])

genus: Chersonesia

- Chersonesia risa (Doubleday, [1848])

C. r. transiens (Martin, 1903) West China

genus: Chitoria

- Chitoria sordida (Moore, [1866]) Southwest China

C. s. sordida (Moore, [1866]) Southwest China

- Chitoria modesta (Oberthür, 1906) Yunnan
- Chitoria naga (Tytler, 1915) Yunnan
- Chitoria ulupi (Doherty, 1889)

C. u. dubernardi (Oberthür) West China, Yunnan
C. u. fulva Leech, 1891 Korea, East China, Sichuan
C. u. tong Yoshino, 1997 Guangxi

- Chitoria chrysolora (Fruhstorfer, 1908)

C. c. eitschbergeri Yoshino, 1997 Guangxi

- Chitoria fasciola (Leech, 1890) West China, Central China
- Chitoria subcaerulea (Leech, 1891) China (Omei Shan)
- Chitoria pallas (Leech, 1890)
- Chitoria leei Lang，2009 Hubei Province, Mt. Shennongjia

genus: Chonala

- Chonala praeusta (Leech, 1890) West China, Central China
- Chonala episcopalis (Oberthür, 1885) West China, Yunnan
- Chonala masoni (Elwes, 1882)
- Chonala houae Lang, Li & Deng, 2017 China, Chongqing, Nanchuan
- Chonala huertasae Lang & Bozano, 2016 Yunnan, Gongshan
- Chonala irene Bozano & Della Bruna, 2006 China, Central Sichuan
- Chonala laurae Bozano, 1999 Chinan, Shaanxi
- Chonala miyatai (Koiwaya, 1996) Sichuan, China.
- Chonala satoshii Tamai & Aoki, 2007 Sichuan, China.
- Chonala yunnana (Li, 1994) Yunnan, Zhongdian

genus: Cirrochroa

- Cirrochroa tyche C. & R. Felder, 1861

C. t. mithila Moore, 1872 Yunnan
C. t. lesseta Fruhstorfer, 1912 South China, Hainan, Hong Kong

genus: Clossiana

- Clossiana selene ([Schiffermüller], 1775)

C. s. dilutior (Fixsen, 1887) Amur, Ussuri

- Clossiana perryi (Butler, 1882) Amur, Ussuri
- Clossiana erubescens (Staudinger, 1901)

C. e. tienschanica (Wagner, 1913) Tian Shan
C. e. houri (Wyatt, 1961)
C. e. chotana (O. Bang-Haas, 1915) Kun Lun Mountains

- Clossiana selenis (Eversmann, 1837)

C. s. sibirica (Erschoff, 1870)
C. s. chosensis (Matsumura, 1927) Ussuri

- Clossiana angarensis (Erschoff, 1870)

C. a. hakutozana (Matsumura, 1927) Northeast China, Amur, Ussuri
C. o. oscarus (Matsumura, 1927) Amur
C. o. australis (Graeser, 1888) Amur, Ussuri

- Clossiana freija (Thunberg, 1791)

C. f. freija (Thunberg, 1791) Amur, Ussuri

- Clossiana thore (Hübner, [1803-1804])

C. t. hyperusia (Fruhstorfer, 1907) Amur, Ussuri
C. f. maritima (Kardakov, 1928) Amur, Ussuri

- Clossiana dia (Linnaeus, 1767)
- Clossiana gong (Oberthür, 1884) West China, Tibet
- Clossiana titania (Esper, 1794)

C. t. staudingeri (Wnukowsky, 1929) Amur

- Clossiana euphrosyne (Linnaeus, 1758)

C. e. orphana (Fruhstorfer, 1907) Amur, Ussur
C. e. orphanoides Huang & Murayama, 1992 Xinjiang

- Clossiana tritonia (Böber, 1812)

C. t. amphilochus (Ménétriés, 1859) Amur, Ussuri

- Clossiana iphigenia (Graeser, 1888)

C. i. iphigenia (Graeser, 1888) Northeast China, Amur, Ussuri

genus: Coelites

- Coelites nothis Westwood, [1850]

C. n. hainanensis Gu, 1994 Hainan

genus: Coenonympha

- Coenonympha pamphilus (Linnaeus, 1758)
- Coenonympha tullia (Müller, 1764)

C. t. sibirica Davenport, 1941 Amur

- Coenonympha hero (Linnaeus, 1761)

C. h. perseis Lederer, 1853

- Coenonympha glycerion (Borkhausen, 1788)

C. g. iphicles Staudinger, 1892 Amur, Ussuri

- Coenonympha mahometana Alphéraky, 1881 Tian Shan
- Coenonympha oedippus (Fabricius, 1787)

C. o. magna Heyne, 1895 Amur, Ussuri

- Coenonympha nolckeni Erschoff, 1874 Tian Shan
- Coenonympha amaryllis (Stoll, [1782]) China, Amur, Ussuri
- Coenonympha xinjiangensis Chou & Huang, 1994 Xinjiang
- Coenonympha tydeus Leech, [1892] Tibet
- Coenonympha sinica Alphéraky, 1888 China
- Coenonympha semenovi Alphéraky, 1887 West China, Tibet
- Coenonympha tyderes Leech
- Coenonympha sunbecca Eversmann, 1843
- Coenonympha arcania (Linnaeus, 1761)

genus: Cupha

- Cupha erymanthis (Drury, [1773])

C. e. erymanthis (Drury, [1773]) South China, Hong Kong, Taiwan, Hainan

genus: Cyrestis

- Cyrestis thyodamas Boisduval, 1846 West China

C. t. chinensis Martin
C. t. formosana Fruhstorfer

- Cyrestis themire Honrath, [1884]

C. t. themire Honrath, [1884]

- Cyrestis cocles (Fabricius, 1787)

C. c. cocles (Fabricius, 1787)

- Cyrestis nivea (Zinken, 1831)

C. n. tonkiniana Fruhstorfer

genus: Danaus

- Danaus genutia (Cramer, [1779])

D. g. genutia China

- Danaus chrysippus (Linnaeus, 1758)
- Danaus melanippus Cramer, 1777
- Danaus plexippus (Linnaeus, 1758)

genus: Davidina

- Davidina armandi Oberthür, 1879 Northeast China, Shanxi
- Davidina alticola Röber, [1907] Central China, Shaanxi

genus: Dichorragia

- Dichorragia nesimachus (Doyère, [1840])

D. n. nesseus (Grose-Smith, 1893) West China

genus: Dilipa

- Dilipa fenestra (Leech, 1891) East China
- Dilipa morgiana (Westwood, [1850])

genus: Discophora

- Discophora sondaica Boisduval, 1836

D. s. zal Westwood, 1851 Yunnan
D. s. tulliana Stichel South China
D. s. hainanensis Fruhstorfer, 1911 Hainan

- Discophora timora Westwood, [1850]

D. t. timora Westwood, [1850]

genus: Doleschallia

- Doleschallia bisaltide (Cramer, [1777])

D. b. continentalis Fruhstorfer, 1899 South Yunnan

genus: Dophla

- Dophla evelina (Stoll, [1790])

D. e. annamita (Moore, 1879) Yunnan
D. e. gasvena (Fruhstorfer, 1913) South China, Hainan

genus: Elymnias

- Elymnias nesaea (Linnaeus, 1764)

E. n. timandra Wallace, 1869 Yunnan

- Elymnias hypermnestra (Linnaeus, 1763)

E. h. hainana Moore, 1878 Hainan
E. h. septentrionalis Zhou & Huang, 1994 Hubei, Guangxi

- Elymnias vasudeva Moore, 1857
- Elymnias malelas (Hewitson, 1863)

E. m. ivena Fruhstorfer, 1911 Yunnan

genus: Enispe

- Enispe lunatus Leech, 1891 West China
- Enispe cycnus Westwood，1851
- Enispe euthymius Doubleday，1845

genus: Erebia

- Erebia ligea (Linnaeus, 1758)

E. l. mienschanica Goltz, 1939 Shanxi

- Erebia ajanensis Ménétriés, 1857 North China

E. a. ajanensis Ménétriés, 1857 Amur
E. a. arsenjevi Kurentzov, 1950 Ussuri

- Erebia aethiops (Esper, 1777)

E. a. isolata Goltz, 1939 Shanxi

- Erebia neriene (Böber, 1809)

E. n. alcmenides Sheljuzhko, 1919 Amur, Ussur

- Erebia alcmena Grum-Grshimailo, 1891 West China, Tibet
- Erebia embla (Thunberg, 1791)

E. e. succulenta Alphéraky, 1897 Amur, Ussuri

- Erebia cyclopius (Eversmann, 1844)

E. c. aporia Schawerda, 1919Amur, Ussuri
E. c. sinopius Huang & Murayama, 1992 Xinjiang

- Erebia wanga Bremer, 1864 Amur
- Erebia edda Ménétriés, 1851 Ussuri
- Erebia turanica Erschoff, [1877 Tian Shan
- Erebia radians Staudinger, 1886 Tian Shan
- Erebia sokolovi Lukhtanov, 1990Tian Shan
- Erebia kalmuka Alphéraky, 1881 Tian Shan
- Erebia sibo Alphéraky, 1881 Tian Shan
- Erebia meta Staudinger, 1886

E. m. alexandra Staudinger, 1887Tian Shan
E. m. melanops Christoph, 1889 Tian Shan

- Erebia discoidalis Kirby, 1837

E. d. yablonoica Warren, 1931 Amur

- Erebia atramentaria Bang-Haas, 1927 China
- Erebia alini (Bang-Haas, 1937) Manchuria
- Erebia theano (Tauscher, 1806)

genus: Ethope

- Ethope henrici (Holland, 1887) Hainan
- Ethope noirei Janet, 1896 West China

genus: Eulaceura

- Eulaceura osteria (Westwood, 1850)

genus: Euphydryas

- Euphydryas maturna (Linnaeus, 1758)

E. m. staudingeri Wnukowsky, 1929 Northwest China

- Euphydryas ichnea (Boisduval, [1833])

E i. ichnea (Boisduval, [1833]) Amur, Ussuri

- Euphydryas aurinia (Rottemburg, 1775)

E. a. aurinia (Rottemburg, 1775) Northwest China

- Euphydryas asiatica (Staudinger, 1881)

E. a. alexandrina (Staudinger, 1887) Tian Shan
E. a. narina (Oberthür, 1909) Tian Shan

- Euphydryas sibirica (Staudinger, 1871)

E. s. eothena (Röber, 1926) Amur, Ussuri
E. s. davidi (Oberthür, 1881) North China

- Euphydryas iduna (Dalman, 1816)

genus: Euploea

- Euploea mulciber (Cramer, [1777])

E. m. mulciber (Cramer, [1777]) South China
E. m. dufresne (Godart, [1824]) Taiwan
E. m. barsine Fruhstorfer, 1904 Taiwan

- Euploea phaenareta (Schaller, 1785)

E. p. juvia Fruhstorfer, 1908 Taiwan

- Euploea midamus (Linnaeus, 1758)

E. m. midamus (Linnaeus, 1758) South China

- Euploea eunice (Godart, 1819)

E. e. hobsoni (Butler, 1877) Taiwan
E. e. coelestis (Fruhstorfer, 1902) Southeast China, Hainan

- Euploea klugii Moore, [1858]

E. k. minorata (Moore, 1878) Hainan
E. k. burmeisteri (Moore, 1883) Southeast China, Hainan

- Euploea radamanthus (Fabricius, 1793)

E. r. radamanthus (Fabricius, 1793)

- Euploea leucostictos (Gmelin, [1790]) Taiwan
- Euploea tulliolus (Fabricius, 1793)

E. t. koxinga Fruhstorfer, 1908 South China, Taiwan

- Euploea algea (Godart, 1819)

E. a. limborgii Moore, [1879]

- Euploea core (Cramer, [1780])

E. c. amymone (Godart, 1819) South China, Hong Kong, Hainan
E. c. prunosa (Moore, 1883) South China

- Euploea modesta Butler, 1866

E. m. deriopes Fruhstorfer, 1911 Hainan

- Euploea camaralzeman Butler, 1866

E. c. formosana Matsumura, 1919 Taiwan

- Euploea sylvester (Fabricius, 1793)

genus: Euripus

- Euripus nyctelius (Doubleday, 1845)

E. n. euploeoides C. & R. Felder, [1867] Yunnan

genus: Euthalia

- Euthalia monina (Fabricius, 1787)

E. m. kesava (Moore, 1859) Yunnan
E. m. tudela Fruhstorfer, 1913 South China, Hainan

- Euthalia eriphylae de Nicéville, 1891
- Euthalia phemius (Doubleday, [1848])

E. p. phemius (Doubleday, [1848]) Yunnan
E. p. seitzi Fruhstorfer, 1913 South China, Hong Kong

- Euthalia aconthea (Cramer, [1777])

E. a. aditha Fruhstorfer, 1913 South China, Hainan
E. a. kingtungensis Lee, 1962 Yunnan

- Euthalia anosia (Moore, [1858])

E. a. yao Yoshino, 1997 Guangxi
E. a. saitaphernes Fruhstorfer, 1913

- Euthalia lubentina (Cramer, [1777])

E. l. lubentina (Cramer, [1777]) South China

- Euthalia confucius (Westwood, 1850) West China, Tibet

E. c. sadona Tytler, 1940 Southeast Tibet, Southeast Yunnan

- Euthalia franciae (Gray, 1846)

E. f. raja (C. & R. Felder, 1859) Yunnan

- Euthalia irrubescens Grose-Smith, 1893 West China, Taiwan
- Euthalia purchella Lee, 1979 Yunnan, Southeast Tibet
- Euthalia kardama (Moore, 1859) West China, Central China
- Euthalia khama Alphéraky, 1895

E. k. khama Alphéraky, 1895 Sichuan, Gansu, Hunan, East Yunnan
E. k. dubernardi Oberthür, 1907 Northwest Yunnan, South Sichuan

- Euthalia kosempona Fruhstorfer, 1908 Taiwan

E. k. albescens Mell, 1928 Guangdong

- Euthalia malapana Shirôzu & Chung, 1958 Taiwan
- Euthalia nara (Moore, 1859)

E. n. shania Evans, 1924 Yunnan
E. n. hainanana Gu, 1994 Hainan
E. n. colinsmithi Huang, 1999 Tibet
E. n. chayuana Huang, 2001 Tibet

- Euthalia omeia Leech, 1891 West China
- Euthalia bunzoi Sugiyama, 1996

E. b. bunzoi Sugiyama, 1996 Sichuan
E. b. tayiensis Yoshino, 1997 Sichuan (Dayi County)

- Euthalia patala (Kollar, [1844])

E. p. patala (Kollar, [1844]) Central China

- Euthalia guangdongensis Wu, 1994 Guangdong
- Euthalia perlella Chou & Wang, 1994 Sichuan
- Euthalia pratti Leech, 1891

E. p. pratti Leech, 1891 China, Tibet
E. p. occidentalis Hall, 1930 Sichuan

- Euthalia sahadeva (Moore, 1859)

E. s. narayana Grose-Smith & Kirby, 1891
E. s. yanagisawai Sugiyama, 1996 Yunnan, Sichuan
E. s. thawgawa Tytler, 1940

- Euthalia strephon Grose-Smith, 1893 Sichuan

E. s. brevifasciata Chou & Gu, 1994 Hainan
E. s. zhaxidunzhui Huang, 1998 Tibet

- Euthalia yasuyukii Yoshino, 1998 Guangxi
- Euthalia telchinia (Ménétriés, 1857 Yunnan
- Euthalia duda Staudinger, 1886 China, Tibet

E. d. sakota Fruhstorfer, 1913 Yunnan

- Euthalia undosa Fruhstorfer, 1906 West China
- Euthalia thibetana (Poujade, 1885)

E. t. thibetana (Poujade, 1885) West China, Tibet
E. t. uraiana Murayama & Shimonoya, 1963 Taiwan
E. t. melli Yokochi, 1997 Guangxi, Guangdong

- Euthalia kameii Koiwava, 1996 Shaanxi
- Euthalia aristides Oberthür, 1907 Sichuan

E. a. kobayashii Yokochi, 2005 Zhejiang, Fujian

- Euthalia formosana Fruhstorfer, 1908 Taiwan
- Euthalia tsangpoi Huang, 1999 Tibet
- Euthalia alpherakyi Oberthür, 1907 West China, Tibet

E. a. monbeigi Oberthür, 1907 Yunnan
E. a. alpherakyi Oberthür, 1907 Sichuan, Guangxi
E. a. insulae Hall, 1930 Formosa
E. a. chayuensis Huang, 2001 Tibet

- Euthalia staudingeri Leech, 1891

E. s. nujiangensis Huang, 2001 Yunnan
E. s. yunnana Oberthür, 1907 Southwest China

- Euthalia heweni Huang, 2002 Yunnan
- Euthalia mingyiae Huang, 2002 Yunnan
- Euthalia hebe Leech, 1891

E. h. hebe Leech, 1891 China, Tibet

- Euthalia pacifica Mell, 1934

E. p. pacifica Mell, 1934 Zhejiang
E. p. xilingensis Yoshino, 1997 Sichuan

- Euthalia pulchella (Lee, 1979) Tibet
- Euthalia pyrrha Leech, [1892]

E. p. pyrrha Leech, [1892] West China
E. p. daitoensis Matsumura, 1919 Taiwan

- Euthalia linpingensis Mell, 1935 Guangdong, Guizhou
- Euthalia koharai Yokochi, 2005 Yunnan, Guangxi
- Euthalia niepelti Strand, 1916
- Euthalia alpheda (Godart, [1824])
- Euthalia masumi Yokochi, 2009 Guangxi, Dayao Shan
- Euthalia hoa Monastyrskii, 2005
- Euthalia apex Tsukada, 1991
- Euthalia ehuangensis (Wang & Li, 2004)

genus: Fabriciana

- Fabriciana niobe (Linnaeus, 1758)

F. n. orientalis (Alphéraky, 1881) Tian Shan
F. n. voraxides Reuss, 1921 Ussuri, Amur

- Fabriciana adippe ([Schiffermüller], 1775)

F. a. tianschanica (Alphéraky, 1881) Tian Shan
F. a. chrysodippe (Staudinger, 1892) Amur
F. a. chinensis Belter, 1931 Sichuan

- Fabriciana coreana (Butler, 1882)

F. c. coreana (Butler, 1882) Amur, Ussuri, China
F. c. ornatissima (Leech, 1892) China

- Fabriciana xipe (Grum-Grshimailo, 1891)

F. x. xipe (Grum-Grshimailo, 1891) Ussuri, China
F. x. rueckerti (Fruhstorfer, 1911) Amur
F. x. aglaiaeformis Watkins, 1924 Ussuri

- Fabriciana nerippe (C. & R. Felder, 1862)

F. n. nerippe (C. & R. Felder, 1862) China, Tibet
F. n. mumon (Matsumura, 1929) Ussuri
F. n. nerippina (Fruhstorfer, 1907) Sichuan, Tibet
F. n. vorax (Butler, 1871) Shanghai

genus: Faunis

- Faunis aerope (Leech, 1890)

F. a. aerope (Leech, 1890) Sichuan, Southeast Tibet

- Faunis canens Hübner, [1826]

F. c. arcesilas Stichel, 1933 South Yunnan

- Faunis eumeus (Drury, [1773])

F. e. eumeus (Drury, [1773]) South China, Hong Kong

genus: Helcyra

- Helcyra hemina Hewitson, 1864
- Helcyra superba Leech, 1890

H. s. superba Leech, 1890 Sichuan
H. s. takamukui Matsumura Taiwan
H. s. wiensis Yoshino, 1997 Zhejiang

- Helcyra plesseni (Fruhstorfer, 1913) Taiwan
- Helcyra subalba (Poujade, 1885) West China, Central China

H. s. subsplendens (Mell)

genus: Herona

- Herona marathus Doubleday, [1848]

genus: Hestina

- Hestina nama (Doubleday, 1844)

H. n. nama (Doubleday, 1844) Yunnan
H. n. melanoides Joicey & Talbot, 1921 Hainan

- Hestina assimilis (Linnaeus, 1758)

H. a. assimilis (Linnaeus, 1758) South China

- Hestina mena Moore, 1858 West China
- Hestina persimilis (Westwood, [1850])

H. p. chinensis (Leech, 1890) West China

- Hestina nicevillei (Moore, [1895])

H. n. ouvradi Riley, 1939 China Yunnan, Tibet

- Hestina namoides de Nicéville, 1900 South China, Tibet

genus: Hipparchia

- Hipparchia autonoe (Esper, 1783) Northwest China, Tibet

H. a. orchomenus (Fruhstorfer, 1911) Tian Shan

- Hipparchia parisatis (Kollar, [1849])

H. p. xizangensis (Chou, 1994) Tibet

genus: Hypolimnas

- Hypolimnas misippus (Linnaeus, 1764)
- Hypolimnas bolina (Linnaeus, 1758)
- Hypolimnas anomala (Wallace, 1869)

genus: Hyponephele

- Hyponephele lycaon (Kühn, 1774) China

H. l. catalampra (Staudinger, 1895) Mongolia

- Hyponephele pasimelas (Staudinger, 1886) Northeast China
- Hyponephele przhewalskyi Dubatolov, Sergeev & Zhdanko, 1994 Tian Shan
- Hyponephele korshunovi Lukhtanov, 1994 Tian Shan
- Hyponephele murzini Dubatolov, 1989 Tian Shan
- Hyponephele hilaris (Staudinger, 1886)

H. h. pallida Samodurow, 2000 Tian Shan

- Hyponephele glasunovi (Grum-Grshimailo, 1893) Tian Shan
- Hyponephele naubidensis (Erschoff, 1874) Tian Shan
- Hyponephele germana (Staudinger, 1887) Tian Shan
- Hyponephele rueckbeili (Staudinger, 1887) Tian Shan
- Hyponephele interposita (Erschoff, 1874)

H. i. interposita(Erschoff, 1874) Northwest China

- Hyponephele laeta (Staudinger, 1886) Tian Shan
- Hyponephele kirghisa (Alphéraky, 1881) Tian Shan
- Hyponephele sheljuzhkoi Samodurov & Tschikolovez, 1996 Tian Shan
- Hyponephele davendra (Moore, 1865)
- Hyponephele lupina (Costa, 1836)
- Hyponephele dysdora (Lederer, 1869)

genus: Idea

- Idea leuconoe Erichson, 1834

I.l. clara (Butler, 1867) Taiwan

genus: Ideopsis

- Ideopsis similis (Linnaeus,1758)

I. s. similis (Linnaeus,1758) South China, Taiwan

- Ideopsis vulgaris (Butler,1874)

I.v. contigua (Talbot,1939) Hainan

genus: Issoria

- Issoria lathonia (Linnaeus, 1758)

I. l. isaaea (Gray, 1846) Yunnan
I. l. isaeoides Reuss, 1925 Sichuan

- Issoria gemmata (Butler, 1881)Tibet

I. g. wui Huang, 1998 Southeast Tibet

- Issoria baileyi (Huang, 1998) Southeast Tibet
- Issoria eugenia (Eversmann, 1847)

I. e. rhea (Grum-Grshimailo, 1891) Tsingai, Gansu
I. e. genia (Fruhstorfer, 1903) Sichuan, Shaanxi
I. e. pulchella Huang, 2001 East Tibet
I. e. tibetana Huang, 1998 West Tibet

- Issoria altissima (Elwes, 1882) South Tibet

genus: Junonia

- Junonia orithya (Linnaeus, 1758

J. o. ocyale Hübner, [1819] Yunnan
J. o. hainanensis (Fruhstorfer, 1912) Hainan

- Junonia hierta (Fabricius, 1798) West China, South China

J. h. hierta (Fabricius, 1798) Yunnan

- Junonia iphita (Cramer, [1779]) West China, South China

J. i. iphita (Cramer, [1779]) South China

- Junonia almana (Linnaeus, 1758)

J. a. almana (Linnaeus, 1758) type locality Canton, China

- Junonia lemonias (Linnaeus, 1758)

J. l. lemonias (Linnaeus, 1758) type locality Canton, China

- Junonia atlites (Linnaeus, 1763)

genus: Kallima

- Kallima inachus (Boisduval, 1846)

K. i. chinensis Swinhoe, 1893 West China, Central China
K. i. formosana Fruhstorfer Taiwan
K. i. siamensis Fruhstorfer, 1912 South Yunnan

- Kallima knyvetti Nicéville, 1886

genus: Karanasa

- Karanasa talastauana Bang-Haas, 1927

K. t. talastauna Bang-Haas, 1927 Tian Shan
K. t. arasana Avinoff & Sweadner, 1951 Tian Shan
K. t. angrena Avinoff & Sweadner, 1951 Tian Shan

- Karanasa wilkinsi (Erschoff, 1884)

K. w. wilkinsi (Erschoff, 1884) Tian Shan

- Karanasa leechi (Grum-Grshimailo, 1890)

K. l. gregorii Avinoff & Sweadner, 1951 Xinjiang

- Karanasa latifasciata (Grum-Grshimailo, 1902) Tian Shan
- Karanasa regeli (Alphéraky, 1881)

K. r. regeli (Alphéraky, 1881) Tian Shan

- Karanasa tancrei (Grum-Grshimailo, 1893) Tian Shan
- Karanasa pungeleri (A. Bang-Haas, 1910) Tian Shan
- Karanasa abramovi (Erschoff, 1884)

K. a. abramovi (Erschoff, 1884) Tian Shan

- Karanasa goergneri Eckweiler, 1990 Gansu

genus: Kirinia

- Kirinia epimenides (Ménétriés, 1859) East China, Amur, Ussuri
- Kirinia epaminondas (Staudinger, 1887) East China, Amur
- Kirinia eversmanni (Eversmann, 1847)

genus: Lasiommata

- Lasiommata maera (Linnaeus, 1758)

L. m. weiwuerica Huang & Murayama, 1992 Xinjiang

- Lasiommata majuscula (Leech, [1892]) West China
- Lasiommata minuscula (Oberthür, 1923) West China
- Lasiommata kasumi Yoshino, 1995 Shaanxi
- Lasiommata petropolitana (Fabricius, 1787) Northeast China

L. p. falcidia (Fruhstorfer, 1908) Amur

- Lasiommata hefengana Chou & Zhang, 1994 Xinjiang

genus: Lasippa

- Lasippa heliodore (Fabricius, 1787)
- Lasippa viraja (Moore, 1872)

genus: Lelecella

- Lelecella limenitoides (Oberthür, 1890)

L. l. limenitoides (Oberthür, 1890) Sichuan
L. l. wangi Chou, 1994 Shaanxi, Henan
L. l. jinlinus (Yoshino, 1997) Shaanxi

genus: Lethe

- Lethe europa (Fabricius, 1775)

L. e. gada Fruhstorfer, 1911 Yunnan
L. e. beroe (Cramer, [1775]) South China

- Lethe rohria (Fabricius, 1787)

L. r. permagnis Fruhstorfer, 1911 South China

- Lethe confusa Aurivillius, 1897

L. c. confusa Aurivillius, 1897 South China, Hainan, Yunnan, Southeast Tibet
L. c. apara Fruhstorfer, 1911 Hong Kong, Hainan

- Lethe mekara (Moore, [1858]) China

L. m. crijnana Fruhstorfer, 1911 Yunnan

- Lethe chandica (Moore, [1858])

L. c. chandica (Moore, [1858]) Yunnan
L. c. coelestis Leech, [1892] West China

- Lethe insana (Kollar, [1844])

L. i. baucis Leech, 1891 West China, Central China stat. rev. now full species

- Lethe kouleikouzana Yoshino, 2008 Yunnan (Gaolingonshan Mountains)
- Lethe serbonis (Hewitson, 1876) West China
- Lethe scanda (Moore, 1857) West China
- Lethe vindhya (C. & R. Felder, 1859)
- Lethe kansa (Moore, 1857)

L. k. vaga Fruhstorfer, 1911 Yunnan

- Lethe sinorix (Hewitson, 1863)
- Lethe latiaris (Hewitson, 1862)

L. l. lishadii Huang, 2002 Yunnan

- Lethe verma (Kollar, [1844])

L. v. sintica Fruhstorfer, 1911 Yunnan
L. v. stenopa Fruhstorfer, 1908 South China, Hainan
L. v. satarnus Fruhstorfer, 1911 West China

- Lethe siderea Marshall, 1881 West China
- Lethe nicetella de Nicéville, 1887 Tibet
- Lethe maitrya de Nicéville, 1881

L. m. metokana Huang, 1998 Tibet
L. m. lijiangensis Huang, 2001 Yunnan

- Lethe jalaurida (de Nicéville, 1881)

L. j. elwesi (Moore, [1892]) West China
L. j. gelduba Fruhstorfer, 1911 Sichuan, Yunnan

- Lethe bitaensis Yoshino, 1999 Yunnan, Tibet
- Lethe violaceopicta (Poujade, 1884) West China (Sichuan, Guizhou)
- Lethe gemina Leech, 1891 West China
- Lethe armandina (Oberthür, 1881) West China
- Lethe albolineata (Poujade, 1884) Yangzi
- Lethe andersoni (Atkinson, 1871) West China
- Lethe argentata (Leech, 1891) West China
- Lethe ocellata (Poujade, 1885) Sichuan, Tibet
- Lethe nigrifascia Leech, 1890 Hubei, Hunan, Henan, Shaanxi, Gansu, Sichuan
- Lethe baoshana (Huang, Wu & Yuan, 2003) Yunnan
- Lethe zhangi (Huang, Wu & Yuan, 2003) Sichuan
- Lethe baileyi South, 1913 Yunnan, Tibet
- Lethe neofasciata Lee, 1985 Yunnan
- Lethe wui Huang, 1999 Tibet
- Lethe lisuae (Huang, 2002) Yunnan
- Lethe uemurai (Sugiyama, 1994)
- Lethe bipupilla Chou & Zhao, 1994 Sichuan
- Lethe butleri Leech, 1889

L. b. butleri Leech, 1889 Central China, West China

- Lethe camilla Leech, 1891 West China
- Lethe christophi Leech, 1891 Central China, West China
- Lethe clarissa Murayama, 1982 West China, Sichuan
- Lethe cybele Leech, 1894 West China, Tibet
- Lethe cyrene Leech, 1890 West China
- Lethe diana (Butler, 1866) East China, Ussuri
- Lethe dura (Marshall, 1882)

L. d. moupiniensis (Poujade, 1884) West China stat. rev. now full species

- Lethe gracilis (Oberthür, 1886) Tibet
- Lethe hecate Leech, 1891 West China

L. h. haba Yoshino, 2008 Yunnan

- Lethe helena Leech, 1891 West China
- Lethe helle (Leech, 1891) West China
- Lethe guansia Sugiyama, 1999 Guangxi, Guangdong
- Lethe labyrinthea Leech, 1890 West China
- Lethe lanaris Butler, 1877 West China
- Lethe laodamia Leech, 1891 West China
- Lethe luteofasciata (Poujade, 1884) China
- Lethe manzorum (Poujade, 1884) West China
- Lethe marginalis Motschulsky, 1860 East China

L. m. obscurofasciata Huang, 2002 Yunnan
L. m. maackii (Bremer, 1861) Amur, Ussuri

- Lethe monilifera Oberthür, 1923 West China
- Lethe oculatissima (Poujade, 1885) West China
- Lethe privigna Leech, [1892] West China
- Lethe procne (Leech, 1891) Yunnan, Sichuan
- Lethe proxima Leech, [1892] West China
- Lethe satyrina Butler, 1871 West China, Tibet
- Lethe sicelides Grose-Smith, 1893 West China
- Lethe sicelis (Hewitson, 1862) China
- Lethe syrcis (Hewitson, 1863)

L. s. syrcis (Hewitson, 1863) China

- Lethe titania Leech, 1891 West China
- Lethe trimacula Leech, 1890 West China
- Lethe umedai Koiwaya, 1998 Sichuan

L. u. umedai Koiwaya, 1998 Sichuan
L. u. albofasciata Huang, 2002 Yunnan

- Lethe liae Huang, 2002 Yunnan
- Lethe yantra Fruhstorfer, 1914
- Lethe yunnana D'Abrera
- Lethe sura (Doubleday, 1848)
- Lethe moelleri Elwes 1887
- Lethe vindhya (Felder and Felder, 1859)
- Lethe baladeva (Moore, 1865)
- Lethe mataja Fruhstorfer 1908
- Lethe sidonis (Hewitson, 1863)
- Lethe lanaris Butler 1877
- Lethe laodamia Leech 1891
- Lethe cyrene Leech 1890
- Lethe visrava (Moore, [1866])
- Lethe niitakana (Matsumura, 1906) Taiwan
- Lethe goalpara Moore, 1865
- Lethe bhairava Moore, 1857
- Lethe gregoryi Watkins, 1927
- Lethe shirozui (Sugiyama, 1997)
- Lethe kanjupkula Tytler, 1914
- Lethe tingeda Q. Zhai & Y.L. Zhang, 2011 China, Guangxi Province
- Lethe hayashii Koiwaya, 1993

genus: Lexias

- Lexias cyanipardus (Butler, [1869])

L. c. cyanipardus (Butler, [1869]) Yunnan
L. c. grandis Yokochi, 1991 South Yunnan

- Lexias albopunctata (Crowley, 1895)

L. a. albopunctata (Crowley, 1895) South China

- Lexias pardalis (Moore, 1878)

L. p. pardalis (Moore, 1878) Hainan
L. p. eleanor (Fruhstorfer, 1898) South China
L. p. jadeitina (Fruhstorfer, 1913) Yunnan

- Lexias dirtea (Fabricius, 1793)

L. d. khasiana (Swinhoe, 1890) Yunnan
L. d. agosthena (Fruhstorfer, 1914) South China, Guangdong
L. d. bontouxi (Vitalis de Salvaza, 1924) Yunnan

- Lexias acutipenna Chou & Li, 1994 Guangxi

genus: Libythea

- Libythea celtis (Laicharting, [1782])

L. c. chinensis Fruhstorfer, 1909 West China

- Libythea myrrha Godart, 1819

L. m. sanguinalis Fruhstorfer, 1898 South China

- Libythea geoffroy Godart, [1824]

L. g. alompra Moore 1901 Hainan

genus: Limenitis

- Limenitis populi (Linnaeus, 1758)

L. p. ussuriensis Staudinger, 1887 Northeast China, Amur, Ussuri
L. p. fruhstorferi Krulikowsky, 1909 Xinjiang
L. p. kingana Matsumura, 1939 Manchuria
L. p. szechwanica Murayama, 1981 Sichuan, Shaanxi, Henan

- Limenitis albomaculata Leech, 1891 West China
- Limenitis dubernardi Oberthür, 1903 West China
- Limenitis ciocolatina Poujade, 1885 West China, Tibet
- Limenitis camilla (Linnaeus, 1764) China

L. c. japonica Ménétriés, 1857 Amur, Ussuri

- Limenitis sydyi Lederer, 1853

L. s. latefasciata Ménétriés, 1859 Northeast China, Amur, Ussuri

- Limenitis cleophas Oberthür, 1893 West China, Tibet
- Limenitis moltrechti Kardakov, 1928 Northeast China, Amur, Ussuri
- Limenitis amphyssa Ménétriés, 1859
- Limenitis doerriesi Staudinger, 1892 Northeast China, Ussuri

L. d. tongi Yoshino, 1997 Zhejiang
L. d. shennonjiaensis Yoshino, 2001 Hubei

- Limenitis helmanni Lederer, 1853

L. h. duplicata Staudinger, 1892 Northeast China, Amur, Ussuri

- Limenitis homeyeri Tancré, 1881

L. h. venata Leech, 1892 Sichuan, Shaanxi
L. h. meridionalis Hall, 1930 Yunnan

- Limenitis misuji Sugiyama, 1994

L. m. misuji Sugiyama, 1994 Sichuan
L. m. wenpingae Huang, 2003 Yunnan

- Limenitis rileyi Tytler, 1940

L. r. xizangana (Huang, 1998) Tibet

- Limenitis tamaii Koiwaya, 2007 Sichuan, Baoxing.

genus: Litinga

- Litinga cottini (Oberthür, 1884)

L. c. cottini (Poujade, 1885) Kangding, West Sichuan, North Yunnan
L. c. zhon (Yoshino, 1998) Tibet
L. c. albata Watkins, 1927 Yunnan
L. c. berchmansi (Kotzsch, 1929) Gansu
L. c. sinensis (O. Bang-Haas, 1937) Gansu
L. c. arayai (Yoshino, 2003) North Sichuan

- Litinga mimica (Poujade, 1885)

L. m. mimica (Poujade, 1885) Sichuan, North China, Central China
L. m. gaolingonensis (Yoshino, 1995) West Yunnan
L. m. meilius (Yoshino, 1997) North Yunnan
L. m. pe (Yoshino, 1997) North Yunnan

genus: Lopinga

- Lopinga achine (Scopoli, 1763)

L. a. achinoides (Butler, 1878) Amur, Ussuri
L. a. catena (Leech, 1890) Central China

- Lopinga deidamia (Eversmann, 1851)

L. d. erebina Butler, 1883 Amur, Ussuri
L. d. thyria (Fruhstorfer, 1909) Central China

- Lopinga dumetorum (Oberthür, 1886) West China, Tibet
- Lopinga nemorum (Oberthür, 1890) West China, Tibet
- Lopinga eckweileri Görgner, 1990 China, Sichuan, Nanping
- Lopinga fulvescens (Alphéraky, 1889) China
- Lopinga gerdae Nordström, 1934 China
- Lopinga lehmanni (Forster, 1980) China

genus: Loxerebia

- Loxerebia loczyi (Frivaldsky, 1885) Suchow
- Loxerebia bocki (Oberthür, 1893) Sichuan
- Loxerebia carola (Oberthür, 1893) Sichuan
- Loxerebia innupta (South, 1913) Tibet
- Loxerebia martyr Watkins, 1927 Sichuan
- Loxerebia megalops (Alphéraky, 1895) Tibet
- Loxerebia sylvicola (Oberthür, 1886) Sichuan
- Loxerebia pratorum (Oberthür, 1886) China, Tibet
- Loxerebia albipuncta (Leech, 1890)

L. a. albipuncta (Leech, 1890) Central China
L. a. sato Yoshino, 1997 Shaanxi

- Loxerebia saxicola (Oberthür, 1876) Inner Mongolia, Gansu, Hebei, Beijing
- Loxerebia pieli Huang & Wu, 2003 Jiangxi
- Loxerebia yphthimoides (Oberthür, 1891) Yunnan
- Loxerebia phyllis (Leech, 1891) China, Tibet
- Loxerebia delavayi (Oberthür, 1891) Yunnan
- Loxerebia ruricola (Leech, 1890)

L. r. ornata (Goltz, 1939) Yunnan
L. r. minorata (Goltz, 1939) Yunnan

- Loxerebia seitzi (Goltz, 1939) Yunnan
- Loxerebia rurigena (Leech, 1890) China, Tibet
- Loxerebia yukikoae

L. y. yukikoae North Sichuan
L. y. sikunianensis Yoshino, 1997 Sichuan

genus: Mandarinia

- Mandarinia regalis Leech, [1892]

M. r. regalis West China, Central China
M. r. baronesa Fruhstorfer, 1906 South Yunnan
M. r. obliqua Zhao, 1994 Sichuan

- Mandarinia uemurai Sugiyama, 1993

genus: Melanargia

- Melanargia russiae (Esper, 1783) Tian Shan
- Melanargia leda Leech, 1891 West China, Tibet
- Melanargia halimede (Ménétriés, 1859) Northeast China
- Melanargia lugens Honrath, 1888 Central China
- Melanargia meridionalis C. & R. Felder, 1862 North China, West China
- Melanargia epimede Staudinger, 1892 Northeast China
- Melanargia ganymedes Rühl, 1895 Tibet
- Melanargia asiatica (Oberthür & Houlbert, 1922) China
- Melanargia montana Leech, 1890 Yangtze

genus: Melanitis

- Melanitis leda (Linnaeus, 1758)

M. l. leda (Linnaeus, 1758) China
M. l. ismene (Cramer, [1775]) Yunnan

- Melanitis phedima (Cramer, [1780]) China

M. p. ganapati Fruhstorfer, 1908 Yunnan

- Melanitis zitenius (Herbst, 1796) China

M. z. auletes Fruhstorfer, 1908
M. z. hainanensis Gu, 1994 Hainan

genus: Melitaea

- Melitaea didyma (Esper, 1778) Northwest China

M. d. kirgisica Bryk, 1940 Tian Shan

- Melitaea persea Kollar, [1850] Tian Shan
- Melitaea didymoides Eversmann, 1847

M. d. didymoides Eversmann, 1847 Amur
M. d. latonia Grum-Grshimailo, 1891 Central China
M. d. pekinensis Seitz, [1909] North China
M. d. eupatides Fruhstorfer, 1917 Gansu
M. d. yugakuana Matsumura, 1927 Ussuri

- Melitaea ala Staudinger, 1881

M. a. sheljuzhkoi Bryk, 1940 Tian Shan
M. a. determinata Bryk, 1940 Tian Shan
M. a. strandi Bryk, 1940 Tian Shan

- Melitaea latonigena Eversmann, 1847
- Melitaea fergana Staudinger, 1882
- Melitaea asteroidea Staudinger, 1881
- Melitaea sibina Alphéraky, 1881
- Melitaea sutschana Staudinger, 1892

M. s. sutschana Staudinger, 1892 Northeast China Amur, Ussuri

- Melitaea lunulata Staudinger, 1901 Tian Shan
- Melitaea infernalis Grum-Grshimailo, 1891 Tian Shan
- Melitaea yuenty Oberthür, 1886 West China

M. r. shanshiensis (Murayama, 1955) Shanxi

- Melitaea arduinna (Esper, 1783)

M. a. arduinna (Esper, 1783) Tian Shan

- Melitaea agar Oberthür, 1886 Tibet
- Melitaea cinxia (Linnaeus, 1758)

M. c. cinxia (Linnaeus, 1758) Amur
M. c. oasis Huang & Murayama, 1992 Xinjiang

- Melitaea arcesia Bremer, 1861 North China, Central China

M. a. rucephala Fruhstorfer, 1915 Tian Shan

- Melitaea sindura Moore, 1865 Tibet
- Melitaea amoenula C. & R. Felder, [1867] Tibet
- Melitaea jezabel Oberthür, 1886 Tibet
- Melitaea bellona Leech, [1892] West China
- Melitaea diamina (Lang, 1789) Northeast China

M. d. hebe (Borkhausen, 1793) Amur, Ussuri

- Melitaea protomedia Ménétriés, 1859 Central China, East China

M. p. protomedia Ménétriés, 1859 Amur, Ussuri
M. p. regama Fruhstorfer, 1915 Southwest China

- Melitaea minerva Staudinger, 1881 Tian Shan
- Melitaea pallas Staudinger, 1886 Tian Shan
- Melitaea rebeli Wnukowsky, 1929
- Melitaea solona Alphéraky, 1881 Tian Shan
- Melitaea sultanensis Staudinger, 1886 Tian Shan
- Melitaea phoebe (Goeze, [1779])

M. p. mandarina Seitz, [1909] Amur
M. p. wagneri Wnukowsky, 1929 Tian Shan

- Melitaea scotosia Butler, 1878 Northeast China
- Melitaea romanovi Grum-Grshimailo, 1891

M. r. romanovi Grum-Grshimailo, 1891 North China
M. r. shanshiensis (Murayama, 1955) Shanxi

- Melitaea athalia (Rottemburg, 1775)

M. a. baikalensis Bremer, 1861 Amur

- Melitaea ambigua Ménétriés, 1859

M. a. ambigua Ménétriés, 1859 Amur
M. a. niphona Butler, 1878 Ussuri

- Melitaea aurelia Nickerl, 1850

M. a. distans Higgins, 1955Tien-Shan

- Melitaea britomartis Assmann, 1847

M. b. amurensis Staudinger, 1892 Amur
M. b. latefascia Fixsen, 1887 Northeast China, Ussuri

- Melitaea plotina Bremer, 1861

M. p. plotina Bremer, 1861 Amur, Ussuri

genus: Mimathyma

- Mimathyma schrenckii (Ménétriés, 1859) Northeast China

M. s. laeta (Oberthür, 1906) Yunnan

- Mimathyma nycteis (Ménétriés, 1858) Northeast China, Amur
- Mimathyma chevana (Moore, [1866])

M. c. leechi Moore Central China, West China

- Mimathyma ambica (Kollar, [1844])

M. a. miranda (Fruhstorfer, 1902) Yunnan

genus: Minois

- Minois dryas (Scopoli, 1763)

M. d. bipunctatus (Motschulsky, 1861) Ussuri

- Minois paupera (Alphéraky, 1888) West China, Tibet
- Minois aurata (Oberthür, 1909) West China
- Minois nagasawae (Matsumura)

genus: Moduza

- Moduza procris (Cramer, [1777])

M. p. procris (Cramer, [1777]) South China

genus: Mycalesis

- Mycalesis francisca (Stoll, [1780])

M. f. sanatana Moore, [1858] Yunnan
M. f. albofasciata Tytler, 1914 Yunnan

- Mycalesis gotama Moore, 1857 China

M. g. charaka Moore, [1875] South China

- Mycalesis perseus (Fabricius, 1775)

M. p. perseus (Fabricius, 1775) China

- Mycalesis mineus (Linnaeus, 1758) China

M. m. subfasciata (Moore, 1882) Yunnan

- Mycalesis perseoides (Moore, [1892]) Yunnan
- Mycalesis intermedia (Moore, [1892]) Yunnan
- Mycalesis suaveolens Wood-Mason & de Nicéville, 1883

M. s. konglua Tytler, 1939 Yunnan

- Mycalesis misenus de Nicéville, 1889 West China
- Mycalesis mamerta (Stoll, [1780])

M. m. mamerta (Stoll, [1780]) China

- Mycalesis malsara Moore, 1857 Yunnan
- Mycalesis anaxias (W. H. Evans, 1920)
- Mycalesis unica Leech, [1892]
- Mycalesis lepcha (Moore, 1880)
- Mycalesis panthaka Fruhstorfer, 1909
- Mycalesis sangaica Butler, 1877

genus: Neope

- Neope armandii (Oberthür, 1876)

N. a. fusca Leech, 1891 West China

- Neope pulaha (Moore, [1858])

N. p. pulaha (Moore, [1858]) Xizang, Tibet
N. p. emeinsis Huang, 2003 Sichuan
N. p. nuae Huang, 2002 Yunnan

- Neope ramosa Leech, 1890 Sichuan, Hubei, Zhejiang, Henan, Fujian
- Neope pulahoides (Moore, [1892])

N. p. pulahoides (Moore, [1892])Yunnan
N. p. chuni Mell, 1923 Fujian, Guangdong
N. p. leechi Okano & Okano, 1984 Sichuan

- Neope simulans Leech, 1891 Tibet, Yunnan
- Neope dejeani Oberthür, 1894 China, Tibet
- Neope christi Oberthür, 1886 West China

N. c. dali Li, 1994 Yunnan

- Neope bremeri (C. & R. Felder, 1862) West China
- Neope goschkevitschii (Ménétriés, 1857)
- Neope oberthueri Leech, 1891 West China, Yunnan
- Neope agrestis (Oberthür, 1876) West China
- Neope muirheadii (C. & R. Felder, 1862) West China, Central China
- Neope pulahina (Evans, 1923) Tibet
- Neope serica (Leech, 1892) West China
- Neope bhadra (Moore, 1857) Guangxi
- Neope lacticolora (Fruhstorfer, 1908)
- Neope christi Oberthur 1886
- Neope yama (Moore, [1858])
- Neope shirozui Koiwaya, 1989
- Neope contrasta
- Neope chayuensis Huang, 2002
- Neope xiangnanensis (Wang & Li, 2002)

genus: Neorina

- Neorina patria (Leech, 1891)
- Neorina hilda Westwood, [1850]
- Neorina neosinica Lee, 1985

genus: Neptis

- Neptis harita Moore, [1875]

N. h. harita Moore, [1875] Yunnan

- Neptis miah Moore, 1857

N. m. disopa Swinhoe, 1893 Sichuan

- Neptis noyala Oberthür, 1906

N. n. noyala Oberthür, 1906 West China
N. n. qionga Gu & Wang, 1994 Hainan

- Neptis sangangi Huang, 2001
- Neptis sappho (Pallas, 1771)
- Neptis hylas (Linnaeus, 1758)

N. h. hylas (Linnaeus, 1758) West China, Southeast China, Hainan, Hong Kong
N. h. kamarupa Moore, [1875] Yunnan
N. h. hainana Moore, 1878 Hainan

- Neptis clinia Moore, 1872

N. c. susruta Moore, 1872 South China
N. c. tibetana Moore, 1899 West China

- Neptis nata Moore, [1858]

N. n. adipala Moore, 1872 Yunnan, South China, Hainan
N. n. candida Joicey & Talbot, 1922 Hainan

- Neptis capnodes Fruhstorfer, 1908

N. c. capnodes Fruhstorfer, 1908 West China
N. c. pandoces Eliot, 1969 Yunnan

- Neptis choui Yuan & Wang, 1994 Shaanxi
- Neptis soma Moore, 1858

N. s. shania Evans, 1924 Southwest China

- Neptis mahendra Moore, 1872

N. m. extensa Leech, [1892] Sichuan
N. m. ursula Eliot, 1969 Yunnan
N. m. xizangensis Wang & Wang, 1994 Tibet
N. m. dulongensis Huang, 2002 Yunnan

- Neptis leucoporos Fruhstorfer, 1908

N. l. leucoporos Fruhstorfer, 1908 South China, Hainan

- Neptis clinioides de Nicéville, 1894

N. c. yaana Wang, 1994 Sichuan

- Neptis sankara (Kollar, [1844])

N. s. antonia Oberthür, 1876 West China
N. s. guiltoides Tytler, 1940 Yunnan
N. s. xishuanbannaensis Yoshino, 1997 Yunnan

- Neptis philyra Ménétriés, 1859

N. p. excellens Butler, 1878 Japan, Southeast China
N. p. melior Hall, 1930 Yunnan

- Neptis zaida Doubleday, [1848]

N. z. thawgawa Tytler, 1940 Yunnan

- Neptis radha Moore, 1857

N. r. sinensis Oberthür, 1906 Sichuan

- Neptis narayana Moore, 1858

N. n. sylvia Oberthür, 1906 Sichuan
N. n. dubernardi Eliot, 1969 Yunnan

- Neptis ananta Moore, 1858

N. a. chinensis Leech, [1892] West China
N. a. minus Yoshino, 1997 Fujian

- Neptis nashona Swinhoe, 1896

N. n. patricia Oberthür, 1906 West China
N. n. chapa Eliot, 1969 Cochin China

- Neptis nycteus de Nicéville, 1890 Tibet
- Neptis manasa Moore, [1858]

N. m. manasa Moore, [1858] Central China, Yunnan
N. m. antigone Leech, 1890 Hubei, East China
N. m. narcissina Oberthür, 1906 Yunnan
N. m. tsangae Huang, 1998 Tibet
N. m. shinkaii Koiwaya, 1996 Tibet

- Neptis philyroides Staudinger, 1887

N. p. philyroides Staudinger, 1887 East China, Amur, Ussuri
N. p. simingshana Murayama, 1980 Zhejiang
N. p. maotai Yoshino, 1997 Guizhou

- Neptis nemorum Oberthür, 1906

N. n. nemorum Oberthür, 1906 Yunnan

- Neptis rivularis (Scopoli, 1763)

N. r. ludmilla (Nordmann, 1851) Tian Shan
N. r. magnata Heyne, [1895] Amur, Ussuri
N. r. sinta Eliot, 1969 Sichuan

- Neptis hesione Leech, 1890

N. h. hesione Leech, 1890 West China, Central China

- Neptis pryeri Butler, 1871

N. p. pryeri Butler, 1871 Southeast China
N. p. arboretorum (Oberthür, 1876) China

- Neptis andetria Fruhstorfer, 1913

N. a. andetria Fruhstorfer, 1913 Hunan, Shaanxi
N. a. oberthueri Eliot, 1969 West China, Sichuan, Shaanxi

- Neptis namba Tytler, 1915

N. n. namba Tytler, 1915 China, Yunnan
N. n. leechi Eliot, 1969 West China

- Neptis pseudonamba Huang, 2001 Tibet
- Neptis theodora Oberthür, 1906

N. t. theodora Oberthür, 1906 Yunnan

- Neptis cartica Moore, 1872

N. c. pagoda Yoshino, 1997 Yunnan

- Neptis sinocartica Chou & Wang, 1994 Guangxi
- Neptis armandia (Oberthür, 1876)

N. a. armandia (Oberthür, 1876) West China, Central China
N. a. manardia Eliot, 1969 Yunnan

- Neptis cydippe Leech, 1890

N. c. cydippe Leech, 1890 West China, Central China
N. c. yongfui Huang, 2002 Yunnan

- Neptis thestias Leech, [1892] West China
- Neptis speyeri Staudinger, 1887 Southeast China, Amur, Ussuri

N. s. genulfa Oberthür, 1908 Yunnan
N. s. chuang Yoshino, 1997 Guangxi

- Neptis sylvana Oberthür, 1906 Yunnan
- Neptis antilope Leech, 1890 Central China, West China, South China

N. a. wuhaii Huang, 2002 Yunnan

- Neptis meloria Oberthür, 1906 Central China, West China
- Neptis guia Chou & Wang, 1994 Guangxi, Hainan
- Neptis arachne Leech, 1890

N. a. arachne Leech, 1890 Central China, West China
N. a. giddeneme Oberthür, 1891 Yunnan

- Neptis thetis Leech, 1890

N. t. thetis Leech, 1890 Hubei, Sichuan, Shaanxi
N. t. tibetothetis Huang, 1998 Tibet
N. t. pumi Yoshino, 1998 Yunnan

- Neptis nemorosa Oberthür, 1906

N. n. nemorosa Oberthür, 1906 Sichuan
N. n. diqingensis Yoshino, 1999 Yunnan

- Neptis alwina Bremer & Grey, [1852]

N. a. alwina Bremer & Grey, [1852] Northeast China, Amur, Ussuri

- Neptis dejeani Oberthür, 1894 West China Southwest China
- Neptis beroe Leech, 1890 Central China, West China
- Neptis divisa Oberthür, 1908 Yunnan
- Neptis qianweiguoi Huang, 2002 Yunnan
- Neptis lixinghei Huang, 2002
- Neptis yerburii Butler, 1886
- Neptis reducta Fruhstorfer, 1908
- Neptis taiwana Fruhstorfer, 1908
- Neptis kuangtungensis Mell, 1923
- Neptis shunghuangensis (Wang & Li, 2002)

genus: Ninguta

- Ninguta schrenckii (Ménétriés, 1859) East China, Amur, Ussuri

N. s. damontas (Fruhstorfer, 1909) Sichuan
N. s. kuatunensis (Mell, 1939) Fujian

genus: Nosea

- Nosea hainanensis Koiwaya, 1993

genus: Nymphalis

- Nymphalis xanthomelas (Esper, 1781) China

N. x. xanthomelas (Esper, 1781) Amur, Ussuri

- Nymphalis urticae (Linnaeus, 1758)

N. u. eximia (Sheljuzhko, 1919) Amur, Ussuri
N. u. stoetzneri (Kleinschmidt, 1929) Sichuan
N. u. chinensis Leech, 1893

- Nymphalis caschmirensis (Kollar, [1844])

N. c. nixa (Grum-Grshimailo, 1890) West China

- Nymphalis ladakensis (Moore, 1878) Tibet
- Nymphalis antiopa (Linnaeus, 1758)

N. a. yedanula (Fruhstorfer, 1909) Sichuan

- Nymphalis io (Linnaeus, 1758)
- Nymphalis c-aureum (Linnaeus, 1758)
- Nymphalis egea (Cramer, [1775])

N. e. undina (Grum-Grshimailo, 1890) Tian Shan

- Nymphalis gigantea (Leech, 1890) Central China, Tibet
- Nymphalis c-album (Linnaeus, 1758)

N. c. extensa (Leech, [1892]) West China, Central China
N. c. hamigera (Butler, 1877) Ussuri

- Nymphalis interposita (Staudinger, 1881)

N. i. tibetana (Elwes, 1888) Northwest China

- Nymphalis canace (Linnaeus, 1763)

N. c. canace (Linnaeus, 1763) South China, Hong Kong
N. c. charonides (Stichel, [1908]) Ussuri

- Nymphalis extensa gongga S.Y. Lang, 2010 Sichuan

genus: Oeneis

- Oeneis magna Graeser, 1888 North China
- Oeneis hora Grum-Grshimailo, 1888 Tian Shan
- Oeneis sculda (Eversmann, 1851)

O. s. pumila Staudinger, 1892 Northeast China

- Oeneis nanna (Ménétriés, 1859)

O. n. nanna (Ménétriés, 1859) Northeast China, Amur

- Oeneis jutta (Hübner, [1806-1806])
- Oeneis urda (Eversmann, 1847)

O. u. urda (Eversmann, 1847) Northeast China

- Oeneis mongolica (Oberthür, 1876)

O. m. hoenei Gross, 1970 Shanxi

- Oeneis tarpeia (Pallas, 1771)

O. t. tarpeia (Pallas, 1771) Northwest China

- Oeneis buddha Grum-Grshimailo, 1891

O. b. buddha Grum-Grshimailo, 1891 Qinhai Lake, Qilian Shan, Xining, Sichuan
O. b. dejeani O. Bang-Haas, 1939 Gongga Shan
O. b. grieshuberi Lukhtanov & Eitschberger, 2000 Gansu (Qilian Shan)
O. b. kincli Kocman, 1994 Qinghai
O. b. frankenbachi Lukhtanov & Eitschberger, 2000 Qinghai (Kunlun Shan)
O. b. pygmea Gross, 1970 Sichuan, Tibet
O. b. brahma O. Bang-Haas, 1913 Tibet

- Oeneis norna Thunberg (1791)

genus: Orinoma

- Orinoma alba Chou & Li, 1994 Yunnan
- Orinoma damaris Gray, 1846

genus: Orsotriaena

- Orsotriaena medus (Fabricius, 1775)

genus: Palaeonympha

- Palaeonympha opalina Butler, 1871

genus: Pantoporia

- Pantoporia assamica (Moore, 1881) South Yunnan
- Pantoporia aurelia (Staudinger, 1886)
- Pantoporia bieti (Oberthür, 1894)

P. b. bieti (Oberthür, 1894) Central China, West China
P. b. lixingguoi Huang, 2002 Yunnan

- Pantoporia dindinga (Butler, 1879)
- Pantoporia hordonia (Stoll, [1790])

P. h. hordonia (Stoll, [1790]) South Yunnan
P. h. rihodona (Moore, 1878) Hainan

- Pantoporia sandaka (Butler, 1892)

P. s. davidsoni Eliot, 1969 Hainan

- Pantoporia paraka (Butler, 1879)

P. p. paraka (Butler, 1879) Hainan

genus: Paralasa

- Paralasa jordana (Staudinger, 1882)

P. j. helios (Bang-Haas, 1927) Tian-Shan

- Paralasa kusnezovi (Avinoff, 1910) Tian-Shan
- Paralasa styx (Bang-Haas, 1927) Tian-Shan
- Paralasa herse (Grum-Grshimailo, 1891) West China, Tibet
- Paralasa discalis South Tibet
- Paralasa batanga Goltz, 1939 Yunnan

genus: Parantica

- Parantica aglea (Stoll, [1782])
- Parantica sita (Kollar, [1844]) China, Tibet

P. s. sita (Kollar, [1844]) Yunnan

- Parantica pedonga Fujioka, 1970 Tibet
- Parantica melaneus (Cramer, [1775])

P. m. melaneus (Cramer, [1775]) South China

genus: Parasarpa

- Parasarpa dudu (Doubleday, [1848])

P. d. dudu (Doubleday, [1848]) Yunnan
P. d. jinamitra (Fruhstorfer, 1908) Taiwan
P. d. hainensis (Joicey & Talbot, 1921) Hainan

- Parasarpa albomaculata (Leech, 1891) West China, Tibet
- Parasarpa albidior (Hall, 1930) Yunnan
- Parasarpa houlberti (Oberthür, 1913) Yunnan
- Parasarpa zayla (Doubleday, [1848]) Yunnan

genus: Paroeneis

- Paroeneis pumilus (C. & R. Felder, [1867]) Tibet
- Paroeneis bicolor (Seitz, [1909]) Tibet
- Paroeneis sikkimensis (Staudinger, 1889) Tibet
- Paroeneis palaearcticus (Staudinger, 1889)

P. p. palaearcticus (Staudinger, 1889) West China, Tibet
P. p. nanschanicus (Grum-Grshimailo, 1902) Qinghai, Gansu, Qilianshan
P. p. buddha O. Bang-Haas, 1927 Qinghai, Gansu, Qilianshan
P. p. iole (Leech, [1892]) Sichuan, Kangding
P. p. atuntsensis (Gross, 1958) Yunnan
P. p. auloceroides Huang, 1999 Tibet

- Paroeneis grandis Riley, 1923 Tibet
- Paroeneis parapumilus Huang, 2001

genus: Parthenos

- Parthenos sylvia (Cramer, [1776])

P. s. gambrisius (Fabricius, 1787) South Yunnan

genus: Patsuia Moore, [1898]

- Patsuia sinensium (Oberthür, 1876)

P. s. sinensium (Oberthür, 1876) Sichuan
P. s. minor (Hall, 1930) Yunnan
P. s. sengei (Kotzsch, 1929) Gansu
P. s. cinereus (O. Bang-Haas, 1937) Gansu
P. s. fulvus (O. Bang-Haas, 1937) Gansu

genus: Penthema

- Penthema adelma (C. & R. Felder, 1862)
- Penthema darlisa Moore, 1878

P. d. pallida Li, 1994 Yunnan

- Penthema formosanum Rothschild, 1898
- Penthema lisarda (Doubleday, 1845)

P. l. bowringi Joicey & Talbot, 1921
P. l. michallati Janet, 1894 Hainan

genus: Phaedyma

- Phaedyma aspasia (Leech, 1890)

P. a. aspasia (Leech, 1890) West China, Central China, Hunnan

- Phaedyma chinga Eliot, 1969

P. c.chinga Eliot, 1969 Central China
P. c. shaanxiensis Wang, 1994 Shaanxi

- Phaedyma columella (Cramer, [1780])

P. c. columella (Cramer, [1780]) South China, Hong Kong, Hainan
P. c. martabana (Moore, 1881) South Yunnan

genus: Phalanta

- Phalanta phalantha (Drury, [1773])

P. p. phalantha (Cramer)
P. p. columbina (Cramer, [1779]) South China, Hainan, Taiwan

genus: Polyura

- Polyura arja (C. Felder & R. Felder) 1867
- Polyura athamas (Drury) 1773

P. a. athamas (Drury) 1773 Sichuan, Yunnan, Hong Kong

- Polyura dolon (Westwood, 1847)

P. d. carolus (Fruhstorfer, 1904) Tibet, Sichuan

- Polyura eudamippus (Doubleday, 1843) Central China

P. e. rothschildi (Leech, 1893) West China
P. e. nigrobasalis (Lathy, 1898) Yunnan
P. e. whiteheadi (Crowley, 1900) Hainan
P. e. cupidinius (Fruhstorfer, 1914) Yunnan
P. e. kuangtungensis (Mell, 1923) Guangdong
P. e. splendens (Tytler, 1940) Yunnan

- Polyura nepenthes (Grose-Smith, 1883)

P. n. nepenthes (Grose-Smith, 1883) South China, Hainan
P. n. kiangsiensis (Rousseau-Decelle, 1938) Kiangsi, Zhejiang

- Polyura posidonius (Leech, 1891)
- Polyura narcaeus (Hewitson, 1854)

P. n. menedemus (Oberthür, 1891) Ta-tsien-lou, Moenia, Yunnan
P. n. meghaduta (Fruhstorfer, 1908) Taiwan
P. n. aborica (Evans, 1924) Tibet

- Polyura schreiber (Godart, [1824])

P. s. assamensis (Rothschild, 1899) Yunnan

genus: Proclossiana

- Proclossiana eunomia (Esper, 1800)

P. e. acidalia (Boeber, 1809) Amur, Ussuri

genus: Prothoe

- Prothoe franck (Godart, [1824])

genus: Pseudergolis

- Pseudergolis wedah (Kollar, 1848)

P. w. wedah (Kollar, 1848) Yunnan
P. w. chinensis Fruhstorfer

genus: Pseudochazara

- Pseudochazara hippolyte (Esper, 1783)

P. h. mercurius Staudinger, 1887 Tian-Shan

- Pseudochazara baldiva (Moore, 1865) Tibet

genus: Ragadia

- Ragadia crisilda Hewitson, 1862

Ragadia crisilda crisildina Joicey & Talbot, 1921 Hainan
Ragadia crisilda latifasciata Leech, 1891 West China

genus: Rhaphicera

- Rhaphicera dumicola (Oberthür, 1876) West China
- Rhaphicera moorei (Butler, 1867) West China, Tibet
- Rhaphicera satricus Doubleday, 1849

genus: Rohana

- Rohana parisatis (Westwood, 1850)

R. p. staurakius (Fruhstorfer, 1913) Hong Kong, Yunnan
R. p. hainana (Fruhstorfer) Hainan

- Rohana nakula (Moore, [1858])

R. n. panna Yoshino, 1995 Yunnan

- Rohana parvata (Moore, 1857)

genus: Sasakia

- Sasakia charonda (Hewitson, 1863)

S. c. coreana Leech, 1887 Central China, West China
S. c. yunnanensis Fruhstorfer Yunnan

- Sasakia funebris (Leech, 1891)

S. f. funebris (Leech, 1891) West China
S. f. genestieri Oberthür Yunnan

- Sasakia pulcherrima Chou & Li

genus: Satyrus

- Satyrus ferula Fabricius, 1793

S. f. altaica Grum-Grshimailo, 1893 Tian-Shan

genus: Sephisa

- Sephisa dichroa (Kollar, [1844]) Southeast China
- Sephisa princeps (Fixsen, 1887) Northeast China, Amur

S. p. tamla Sugiyama, 1999 Yunnan

- Sephisa chandra (Moore, [1858])

S. c. chandra (Moore, [1858]) West China
S. c. zhejiangana Tong, 1994 Zhejiang

- Sephisa daimio Matsumura, 1910 Taiwan

genus: Sinonympha

- Sinonympha avinoffi (Schaus, 1927) West China

genus: Speyeria

- Speyeria aglaja (Linnaeus, 1758)

S. a. gigasvitatha (Verity, 1935) Tian Shan
S. a. clavimacula (Matsumura, 1929) Ussuri
S. a. kenteana (Stichel, 1901) Ussuri

- Speyeria clara (Blanchard, [1844]) Tibet

genus: Stibochiona

- Stibochiona nicea (Gray, 1846)

S. n. nicea (Gray, 1846) West China

genus: Stichophthalma

- Stichophthalma howqua (Westwood, 1851) North china, Central China, Formosa

S. h. formosana Fruhstorfer, 1908 Formosa
S. h. miyana Fruhstorfer, 1913 Canton
S. h. suffusa Leech, 1892 Sichuan, Fujian stat. rev. now full species

- Stichophthalma louisa (Wood-Mason, 1877)

S. l. mathilda Janet, 1905 Yunnan

- Stichophthalma sparta de Nicéville, 1894

S. s. gonshana Huang, 2003 Yunnan

- Stichophthalma neumogeni Leech, [1892]

S. n. neumogeni Leech, [1892] Sichuan, Shaanxi, Fujian, Jiangxi, Zheijian stat. rev. now full species
S. n. le Joicey & Talbot, 1921 Hainan Island stat. rev. now full species
S. n. renqingduojiei Huang, 1998 Tibet

- Stichophthalama fruhstorferi Rober,1903 Guangxi
- Stichophthalma nourmahal (Westwood, 1851)
- Stichophthalma camadeva (Westwood, 1848)

genus: Sumalia

- Sumalia daraxa (Doubleday, [1848])

S. d. daraxa (Doubleday, [1848]) West China

genus: Symbrenthia

- Symbrenthia brabira Moore, 1872

S. b. leoparda Chou & Li, 1994 South Yunnan
S. b. sinica Moore, 1899 West China

- Symbrenthia doni Tytler, 1940 Tibet
- Symbrenthia hippoclus (Cramer, [1779])

S. h. hippoclus (Cramer, [1779]) West China, Central China, South China
S. h. lucina (Stoll, [1780]) Yunnan

- Symbrenthia hypselis (Godart, [1824])

S. h. hypselis (Godart, [1824]) West China
S. h. cotanda Moore, [1875] Yunnan

- Symbrenthia lilaea (Hewitson, 1864)

S. l. lilaea (Hewitson, 1864) China
S. l. formosanus Fruhstorfer, 1908 Formosa

- Symbrenthia viridilunulata Huang & Xue, 2004 Sichuan
- Symbrenthia niphanda Moore, 1872
- Symbrenthia silana de Nicéville, 1885
- Symbrenthia sinoides Hall, 1935

genus: Tanaecia

- Tanaecia lepidea (Butler, 1868)

T. l. cognata (Moore, [1897]) Yunnan

- Tanaecia cocytus (Fabricius, 1787)

T. c. ambrysus (Fruhstorfer, 1913) Yunnan

- Tanaecia julii (Lesson, 1837)

T. j. julii (Lesson, 1837) Yunnan

- Tanaecia jahnu (Moore, [1858])

T. j. jahnides (Fruhstorfer, 1905) Yunnan

- Tanaecia whiteheadi (Crowley, 1900)

T. w. whiteheadi (Crowley, 1900) Hainan
T. w. telchinioides (Mell, 1923) Guangdong

genus: Tatinga

- Tatinga thibetana (Oberthür, 1876)

genus: Terinos

- Terinos atlita (Fabricius, 1787)

T. a. guangxienisChou, 1994 Guangxi

genus: Thaumantis

- Thaumantis diores Doubleday, 1845

T. d. diores Doubleday, 1845

- Thaumantis hainana Crowley 1900

genus: Thauria

- Thauria lathyi (Fruhstorfer, 1902)

genus: Timelaea

- Timelaea maculata (Bremer & Grey, [1852] China
- Timelaea aformis Chou, 1994 Hubei
- Timelaea albescens (Oberthür, 1886)
- Timelaea radiata Chou & Wang, 1994 Gansu
- Timelaea nana Leech, 1893 West China

genus: Tirumala

- Tirumala gautama (Moore, 1877)

T. g. gautama (Moore, 1877) Hainan

- Tirumala limniace (Cramer, [1775])

T. l. limniace (Cramer, [1775]) South China, Hainan, Taiwan

- Tirumala septentrionis (Butler, 1874)

T. s. septentrionis (Butler, 1874) West China, South China, Taiwan

- Tirumala alba Chou & Gu, 1994 Hainan

genus: Triphysa

- Triphysa albovenosa Erschoff, 1885 North China
- Triphysa dohrnii Zeller, 1850
- Triphysa nervosa Motschulsky, 1866

genus: Vagrans

- Vagrans egista (Cramer, [1780])

V. e. sinha (Kollar, [1844]) South China, Hunnan

genus: Vanessa

- Vanessa indica (Herbst, 1794)

V. i. indica (Herbst, 1794)

- Vanessa cardui (Linnaeus, 1758)

genus: Vindula

- Vindula erota (Fabricius, 1793)

V. e. erota (Fabricius, 1793) Yunnan

- Vindula dejone (Erichson, 1834)

genus: Yoma

- Yoma sabina (Cramer, [1780])

genus: Ypthima

- Ypthima similis Elwes & Edwards, 1893

Y. s. similis Elwes & Edwards, 1893 Yunnan

- Ypthima sobrina Elwes & Edwards, 1893 Yunnan
- Ypthima savara Grose-Smith, 1887

Y. s. savara Grose-Smith, 1887 Yunnan

- Ypthima sakra Moore, 1857

Y. s. austeni (Moore, 1893) Tibet
Y. s. nujiangensis Huang, 2001 Tibet
Y. s. leechi Forster, [1948] Sichuan

- Ypthima methorina Oberthür, 1891 Guizhou, Kangding
- Ypthima medusa Leech, [1892] Sichuan
- Ypthima conjuncta Leech, 1891

Y. c. conjuncta Leech, 1891 Central China, West China
Y. c. monticola Uemura & Koiwaya, 2000 Yunnan

- Ypthima microphthalma Forster, [1948] Yunnan
- Ypthima tappana Matsumura, 1909

Y. t. continentalis Murayama, 1981 Yunnan, Sichuan

- Ypthima baldus (Fabricius, 1775)

Y. b. baldus (Fabricius, 1775) Yunnan
Y. b. luoi Huang, 1999 Yunnan
Y. b. hyampeia Fruhstorfer, 1911 Ussuri

- Ypthima zodia Butler, 1871 Hainan
- Ypthima lisandra (Cramer, [1780])

Y. l. lisandra (Cramer, [1780]) South China

- Ypthima praenubila Leech, 1891

Y. p. praenubila Leech, 1891 Central China, West China

- Ypthima huebneri Kirby, 1871 Yunnan
- Ypthima chinensis Leech, 1892 Central China
- Ypthima iris Leech, 1891

Y. i. iris Leech, 1891 Sichuan
Y. i. microiris Uémura & Koiwaya, 2000 Tibet
Y. i. paradromon Uémura & Koiwaya, 2000 Yunnan
Y. i. naqialoa Huang, 2003 Yunnan

- Ypthima dromon Oberthür, 1891 Yunnan
- Ypthima beautei Oberthür, 1884

Y. b. beautei Oberthür, 1884 West China
Y. b. qinghaiensis Huang & Wu, 2003 Qinghai

- Ypthima pseudodromon Forster, [1948] Yunnan
- Ypthima akbar Talbot, 1947 Yunnan
- Ypthima insolita Leech, 1891 West China
- Ypthima putamdui South, 1913 Sichuan
- Ypthima frontierii Uémura & Monastyrskii, 2000 Guangxi
- Ypthima yoshinobui Huang & Wu, 2003 Qinghai
- Ypthima lihongxingi Huang & Wu, 2003 Hubei
- Ypthima newara Moore, [1875]

Y. n. yaluzangbui Huang, 1999 Tibet

- Ypthima dengae Huang, 2001 Tibet
- Ypthima confusa Shirôzu & Shima, 1977 Yunnan
- Ypthima muotuoensis Huang, 2000

Y. m. muotuoensis Huang, 2000 Tibet
Y. m. dulongae Huang, 2003 Yunnan

- Ypthima pemakoi Huang, 1998 Tibet
- Ypthima sinica Uémura & Koiwaya, 2000 East China, Sichuan
- Ypthima tiani Huang & Liu, 2000

Y. t. tiani Huang & Liu, 2000 Sichuan
Y. t. nuae Huang, 2001 Yunnan

- Ypthima motschulskyi (Bremer & Grey, 1853) East China, Hong Kong, Amur
- Ypthima yangjiahei Huang, 2001 Yunnan
- Ypthima multistriata Butler, 1883

Y. m. ganus Fruhstorfer, 1911 North China, Central China

- Ypthima perfecta Leech, 1892

Y. p. perfecta Leech, 1892 Central China, West China

- Ypthima sordida Elwes & Edwards, 1893 Yunnan, Shaanxi
- Ypthima imitans Elwes & Edwards, 1893 Hainan
- Ypthima phania (Oberthür, 1891) Yunnan
- Ypthima ciris Leech, 1891

Y. c. ciris Leech, 1891 West China
Y. c. clinioides Oberthür, 1891 Yunnan

- Ypthima albipuncta Lee, 1985 Yunnan
- Ypthima parasakra Eliot, 1987

Y. p. menpae Huang, 1999 Tibet
Y. p. mabiloa Huang, 2003 Yunnan

- Ypthima megalomma Butler, 1874
- Ypthima nareda (Kollar, [1844])
- Ypthima esakii Shirôzu, 1960
- Ypthima nikaea Moore, [1875]
- Ypthima formosana Fruhstorfer, 1908
- Ypthima yamanakai Sonan, 1938
- Ypthima zyzzomacula Chou & Li, 1994 Yunnan
- Ypthima melli Forster 1948
- Ypthima norma (Westwood, 1851)
- Ypthima akragas Fruhstorfer, 1911
- Ypthima argus (Butler, 1866)
- Ypthima uemuraiana Huang, 1999
- Ypthima pseudosakra Huang, 1999
- Ypthima angustipennis Takahashi, 2000
- Ypthima wangi Lee, 1998
- Ypthima wenlungi M. Takáhashi, 2007 Taiwan
- Ypthima eckweileri Uémura & Koiwaya, 2001
