= Necatia =

Scientific classification
- Kingdom: Animalia
- Phylum: Arthropoda
- Subphylum: Chelicerata
- Class: Arachnida
- Order: Araneae
- Infraorder: Araneomorphae
- Family: Salticidae
- Genus: Necatia; Özdikmen, 2007
- Species: N. magnidens

Binomial name
- Necatia magnidens (Schenkel, 1963)

Synonyms
- Davidia magnidens Schenkel, 1963 (preoccupied, see text); Davidina magnidens Brignoli, 1985 (preoccupied, see text)

Genus of spiders

Necatia is a genus of the jumping spider family Salticidae. Its only species, Necatia magnidens, is found in southern China.

The species is only known from a single female specimen, collected in 1872 by A. David, and described by Schenkel almost a hundred years later. Nothing more has been reported of the species since.

== Description ==
From above, the carapace is U-shaped, slightly flared at the front. The female is slightly larger than six millimetres (0.24 in). The posterior lateral eyes are located almost halfway along the carapace. The abdomen is longer than broad and the legs are spiny. Schenkel described the specimen as having an overall brownish black color, "which is, perhaps, not surprising for a specimen preserved for so long".

== Taxonomy ==
Taxonomically, this genus is interesting. The name Davidina was proposed by Brignoli in 1985 as a replacement for the original name Davidia, proposed by Schenkel in 1963. This was necessary according to ICZN rules, because Davidia had already been established by Hicks in 1873 as the name of a genus of Cycloconchidae, fossil mollusks. However, Brignoli overlooked that in 1879, Oberthür had already named a genus of Satyrini thus.
