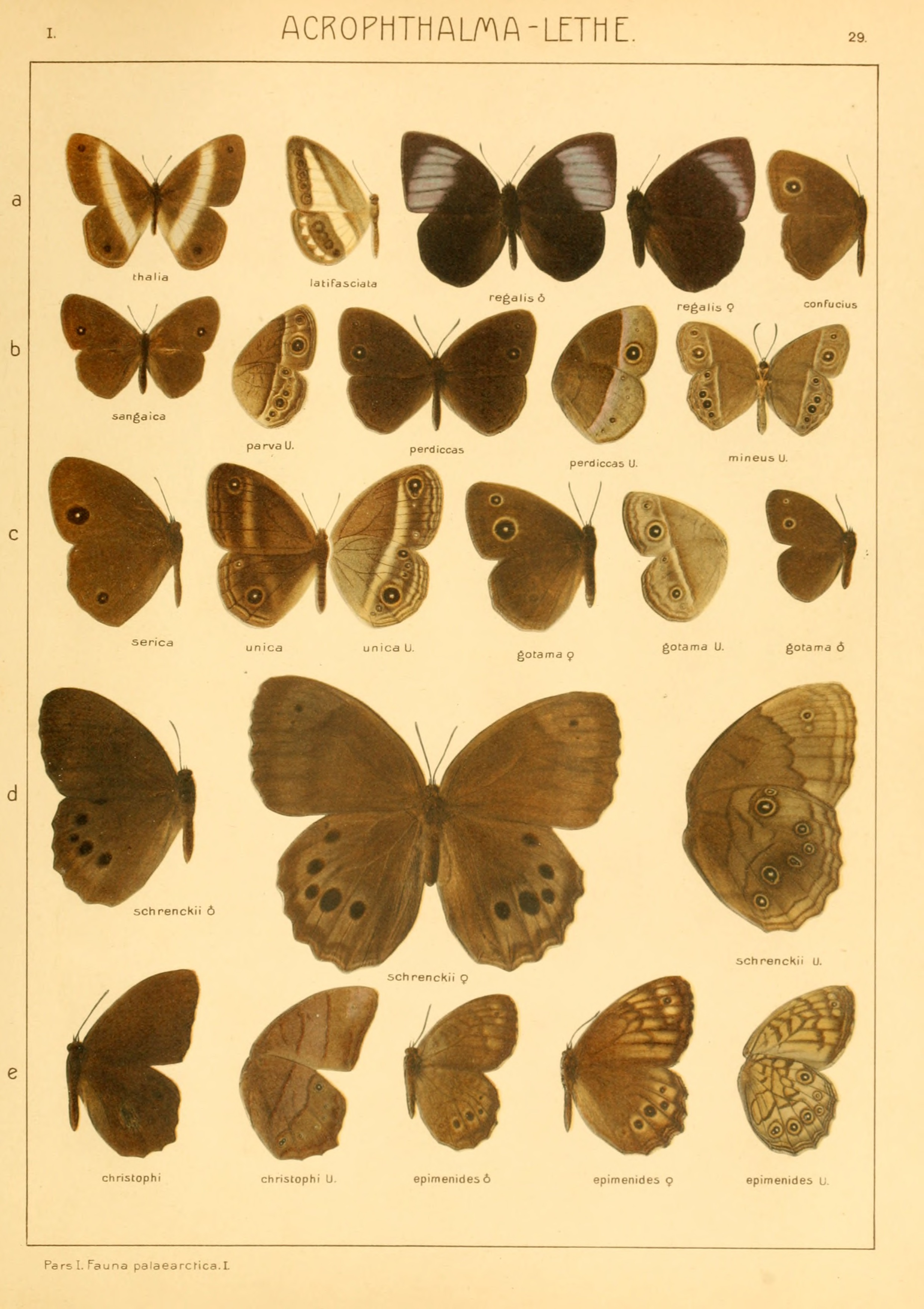
- Acropolis thalia in Adalbert Seitz's Die Großschmetterlinge der Erde (a)

Scientific classification
- Domain: Eukaryota
- Kingdom: Animalia
- Phylum: Arthropoda
- Class: Insecta
- Order: Lepidoptera
- Family: Nymphalidae
- Tribe: Ragadiini
- Genus: Acropolis; Hemming, 1934
- Species: A. thalia

Binomial name
- Acropolis thalia (Leech, 1891)

Synonyms
- Generic: Pharia Fruhstorfer, 1911; Specific: Acrophthalmia thalia Leech, 1891

= Acropolis thalia =

Species of butterfly

Acropolis is a monotypic butterfly genus from the subfamily Satyrinae in the family Nymphalidae. The one species in the genus, Acropolis thalia, is distributed in western subtropical China. The genus was erected by Francis Hemming in 1934 based on a species described by John Henry Leech in 1891.

== Description ==
Adalbert Seitz wrote:

The species of this genus are not large and have a very extraordinarily small and delicate body. The wings are relatively broad and rounded. The subcostal of the forewing is very strongly and evenly inflated from the base to beyond the first third. A. thalia Leech is dull dark brown; a white band runs from the costa of the forewing to the anal margin of the hindwing; at the apex of the forewing and at the anal angle of the hindwing a dark ocellus, which, on the underside, bears a white pupil and a yellow ring. Near Omi-shan and Pu-tsufong. in July."
