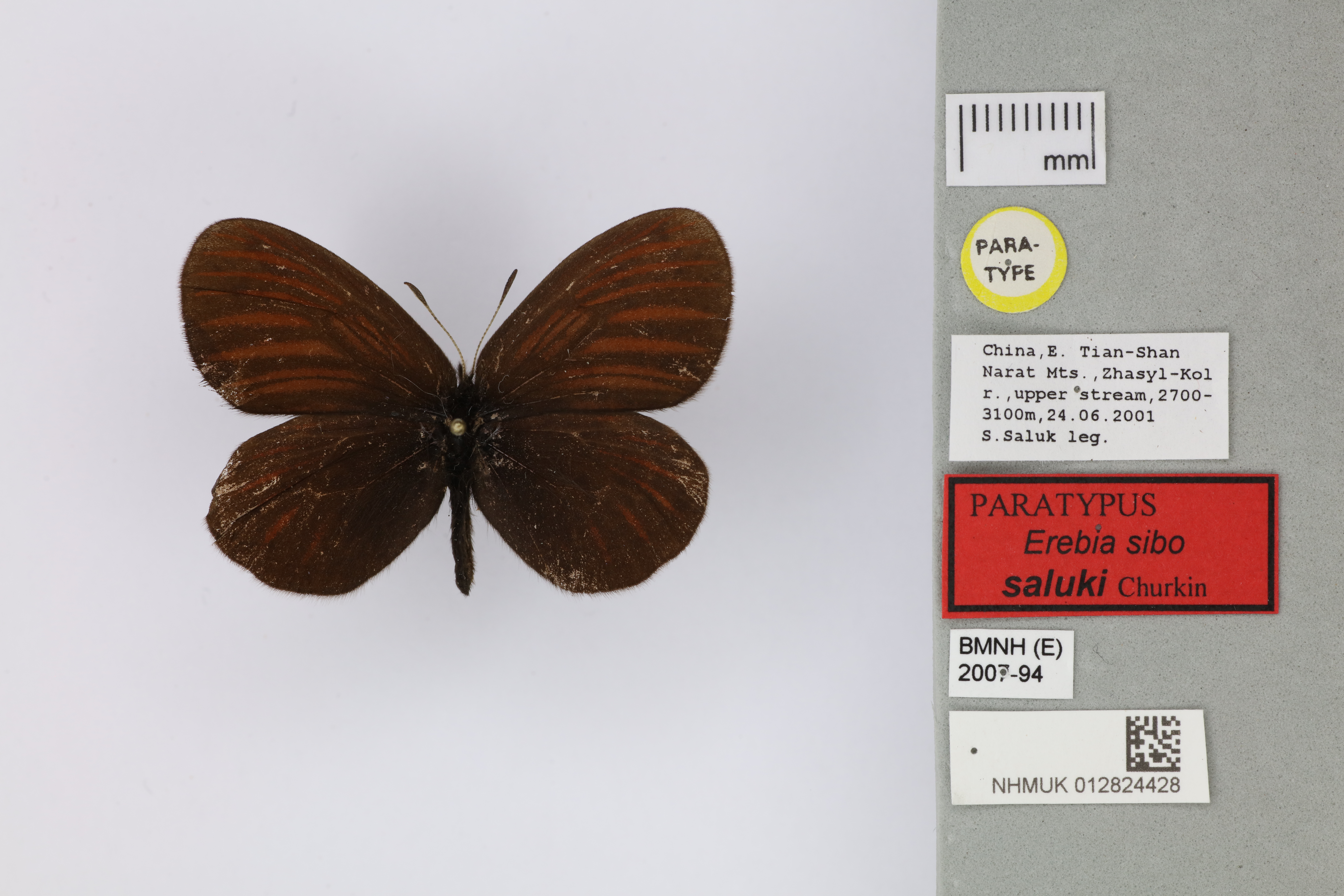
- Erebia sibo saluki

Scientific classification
- Kingdom: Animalia
- Phylum: Arthropoda
- Class: Insecta
- Order: Lepidoptera
- Family: Nymphalidae
- Genus: Erebia
- Species: E. sibo

Binomial name
- Erebia sibo Alphéraky, S. 1881

= Erebia sibo =

Species of butterfly

Erebia sibo is a member of the subfamily Satyrinae of the family Nymphalidae. It is found in Tian-Shan.The wings above dark black-brown, sometimes with narrow brown longitudinal streaks, which are pointed distally and are quite obsolescent, being occasionally altogether absent in the male, while they are nearly always more or less distinct in the somewhat lighter female.Underside of the forewing of the male dull russet-brown, the costal margin, apex and veins being dusted with grey. The hindwing beneath grey-brown, mixed with white-grey, all the veins being scaled white. The dark brown transverse band is distally strongly sinuous and here limited by a number of grey-white spots. Along the distal margin there is a band consisting of brown tooth-like spots. In the female the underside of both wings much lighter than in the male in consequence of the strong increase of the white-grey scaling; the brown longitudinal streaks of the upperside are but feebly indicated on the forewing beneath or there are only small vestiges of them. The hindwing beneath still more densely dusted with white, sometimes the whole wing being shaded with white-grey, only the brown median band and the dentate band at the distal margin remaining visible and contrasting sharply with the white-grey colour. The antenna black-brown above, white-grey beneath, the tip of the club being red-yellow. The female always smaller than the male; the latter varies in size from 43 to 65 mm; while the female mostly measures only 42—44 mm. —: In the Kuldja district, Tian-shan, up to 10000 ft.
