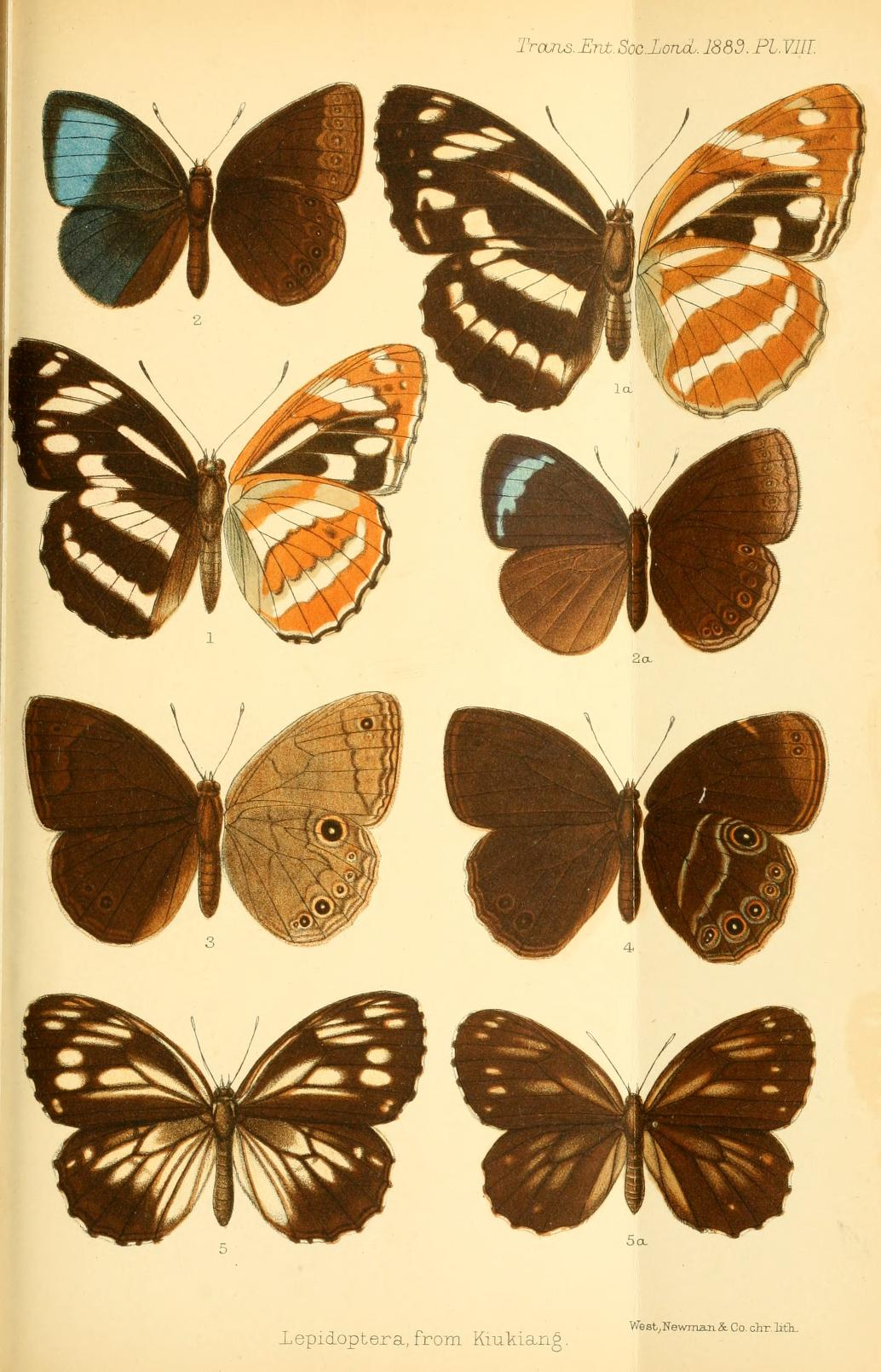
- Mandarinia regalis, figure 2 male, 2a female

Scientific classification
- Kingdom: Animalia
- Phylum: Arthropoda
- Class: Insecta
- Order: Lepidoptera
- Family: Nymphalidae
- Subfamily: Satyrinae
- Genus: Mandarinia; Leech, [1892]
- Species: M. regalis

Binomial name
- Mandarinia regalis (Leech, 1889)

Synonyms
- Mycalesis regalis Leech, 1889; Mandarinia regalis duchessa Fruhstorfer, 1913; Mandarinia regalis callotaenia Fruhstorfer, 1913

= Mandarinia =

Genus of butterflies

Mandarinia is a monotypic butterfly genus in the family Nymphalidae (Satyrinae). Its single species is Mandarinia regalis which has three subspecies.

== Subspecies ==
- Mandarinia regalis regalis (West China, Central China, Burma)
- Mandarinia regalis baronesa Fruhstorfer, 1906 (Indo China, Burma, South Yunnan)
- Mandarinia regalis obliqua Zhao, 1994 (Sichuan)

A second species, Mandarinia uemurai, Sugiyama, 1993 is described from Dujiangya Sichuan, China.
