= Erebia alcmena =

- depicted in Leech, J. Butterflies from China, Japan, and Corea(1892) figure 10

Scientific classification
- Kingdom: Animalia
- Phylum: Arthropoda
- Clade: Pancrustacea
- Class: Insecta
- Order: Lepidoptera
- Family: Nymphalidae
- Genus: Erebia
- Species: E. alcmena

Binomial name
- Erebia alcmena Grum-Grshimailo, 1891

Species of butterfly

Erebia alcmena is a member of the subfamily Satyrinae of the family Nymphalidae. It is found in Tibet, West China and Japan. alcemene Gr.-Grsh. (37e), from the Dshakar Mts. (?) [Djachar gebirge Kukunor, Tibet?] and Amdo, differs from sedakovii in the russet band of the forewing above being incurved and duller yellow; the ocelli of the same moreover have no pupils or only very indistinct ones.The specimens from West China are distinguished from Tibetan examples by the paler colour of the band of the forewing and a more uniform grey of the underside of the hindwing. — The butterfly is not rare in Siberia and on the north island of Japan, being very local on the main island of Japan, and very plentiful in Western China at an elevation of 10000 ft. in July and August.
