= Francis Hemming =

English entomologist (1893–1964)

Arthur Francis Hemming
- Born: 9 February 1893; London, England
- Died: 22 February 1964 (aged 71); London, England
- Education: Corpus Christi College, Oxford
- Known for: Zoological nomenclature
- Awards: C.M.G. and C.B.E.
- Scientific career
- Fields: Zoology, Entomology

Notes
- The 1958 International Code of Zoological Nomenclature was often jokingly referred to as the Hemming Code.

Arthur Francis Hemming, CMG, CBE (9 February 1893 – 22 February 1964) was an English entomologist who specialised in Lepidoptera. He was mostly known, both professionally and socially, by his middle-name as Francis Hemming.

Hemming was a British civil servant and amateur lepidopterist. An expert in biological nomenclature, he served from 1937 to 1958 as Secretary to the International Commission on Zoological Nomenclature and was founder and editor of the Bulletin of Zoological Nomenclature. Over his lifetime he published more than 1,000 scientific papers on Lepidoptera. His manuscripts and other papers are deposited in the Natural History Museum in London and at the Bodleian Library, Oxford.

== Biography ==
Hemming was educated at Rugby School, and Corpus Christi College, Oxford. During World War I he was severely wounded in 1916, and in 1918 he joined the British Civil Service. He was private secretary to several ministers and was appointed CMG and CBE for his services, especially in the revision of the International Code of Zoological Nomenclature (often jokingly referred to as the Hemming Code) that was officially adopted in 1958.

The genus Nabokovia (Lycaenidae) was named by Hemming in 1960, in honor of the novelist and entomologist Vladimir Nabokov, whose earlier generic name was found by Hemming to be a junior homonym. Nabokov invited Hemming to provide the substitute name.

First married to Vera Montague Murray in 1924 (marriage dissolved in 1932) with whom he had one son, Christopher Francis Hemming. Second marriage to novelist Marjorie McLean Firminger (Jam To-Day, 1930) on 1 June 1933, third marriage in 1947 to Margaret Francis Waley Joseph (b. April 29, 1910), with whom he had two daughters, Rachel Cecilia Waley Hemming (b. 1947) and Judith Frances Waley Hemming (b. 1948).

Hemming won international recognition for his decades of dedicated service to zoological nomenclature and to entomology.

== Selected works ==
- (1929). Notes on the generic names of the Holarctic Lycaenidae (Lep. Rhop.). Ann. Mag. Nat. Hist. 10 (3): 217–245
- (1933). On the types of certain butterfly genera. Entomologist 66 : 196–200
- (1933). Additional notes on the types of certain butterfly genera. Entomologist 66 : 222–225
- (1934). Revisional notes on certain species of Rhopalocera (Lepidoptera). Stylops 3 : 193–200
- (1934). The Generic Names of the Holarctic Butterflies. London : British Museum Vol. 1 (1758–1863), p. viii + 3–184
- (1934). Notes on nine genera of butterflies. Entomologist 67 : 37–38
- (1934). New names for three genera of Rhopalocera. Entomologist 67 : 77
- (1935). Notes on certain genera and species of Papilionidae (Lepidoptera). Entomologist 68 : 39–41
- (1935). Notes on seventeen genera of Rhopalocera. Stylops 4 : 1–3
- (1935). Note on the genotypes of three genera of Rhopalocera represented in the fauna of Abyssinia. 374 (App. 1), 434-436 in Carpenter, G.D.H. The Rhopalocera of Abyssinia a faunistic study. Trans. R. Entomol. Soc. Lond. 83 : 313–447
- (1937). Hübner: a Bibliographical and Systematic Account of the Entomological Works of Jacob Hübner and of the Supplements thereto by Carl Geyer, Gottfried Franz von Frölich and Gottlieb August Wilhelm Herrich-Schäffer. London : Royal Entomological Society of London Vol. 1 : xxxiv + 605 p.
- (1939). Notes on the generic nomenclature of the Lepidoptera Rhopalocera I. Proc. R. Entomol. Soc. Lond. (B) 8 (7) : 133–138
- (1941). The dates of publication of the several portions of Doubleday, E. Genera of Diurnal Lepidoptera, and the continuation thereof by Westwood, J.O. J. Soc. Bibliogr. Nat. Hist. 1 (11) : 335–412
- (1941). The types of genera established by Doubleday, (E.) in the Genera of Diurnal Lepidoptera, and by Westwood, (J.O.) in the continuation thereof. J. Soc. Bibliogr. Nat. Hist. 1 (11) : 413–446
- (1941). The dates of publication of the specific names first published in Doubleday, (E.) Genera of Diurnal Lepidoptera, and in the continuation thereof by Westwood, (J.O.). J. Soc. Bibliogr. Nat. Hist. 1 (11) : 447–464
- (1943). Notes on the generic nomenclature of the Lepidoptera Rhopalocera, II. Proc. R. Entomol. Soc. Lond. (B) 12 (2) : 23–30
- (1945). Hewitson (W.C.), Illustr. New Spec. Exot. Butterflies: supplementary note on the composition and dates of publication of certain parts. J. Soc. Bibliogr. Nat. Hist. 2 (2) : 51–53
- (1960). Annotationes Lepidopterologicae. Pts 1–2. London : Hepburn & Sons : 1-72
- (1964). Annotationes Lepidopterologicae. Pts 3–5. London : Hepburn & Sons : [73] + 180 + vii
- (1965). Telicota Moore, [1881] (Insecta, Lepidoptera, Hesperiidae): proposed designation of a type-species under the Plenary Powers. Z.N.(S.) 1684. Bull. Zool. Nomencl. 22 (1) : 79
- (1967). The generic names of the butterflies and their type-species (Lepidoptera: Rhopalocera). Bull. Br. Mus. (Nat. Hist.) Entomol. (Suppl.) 9

== See also ==
- John Hemming, explorer and author
