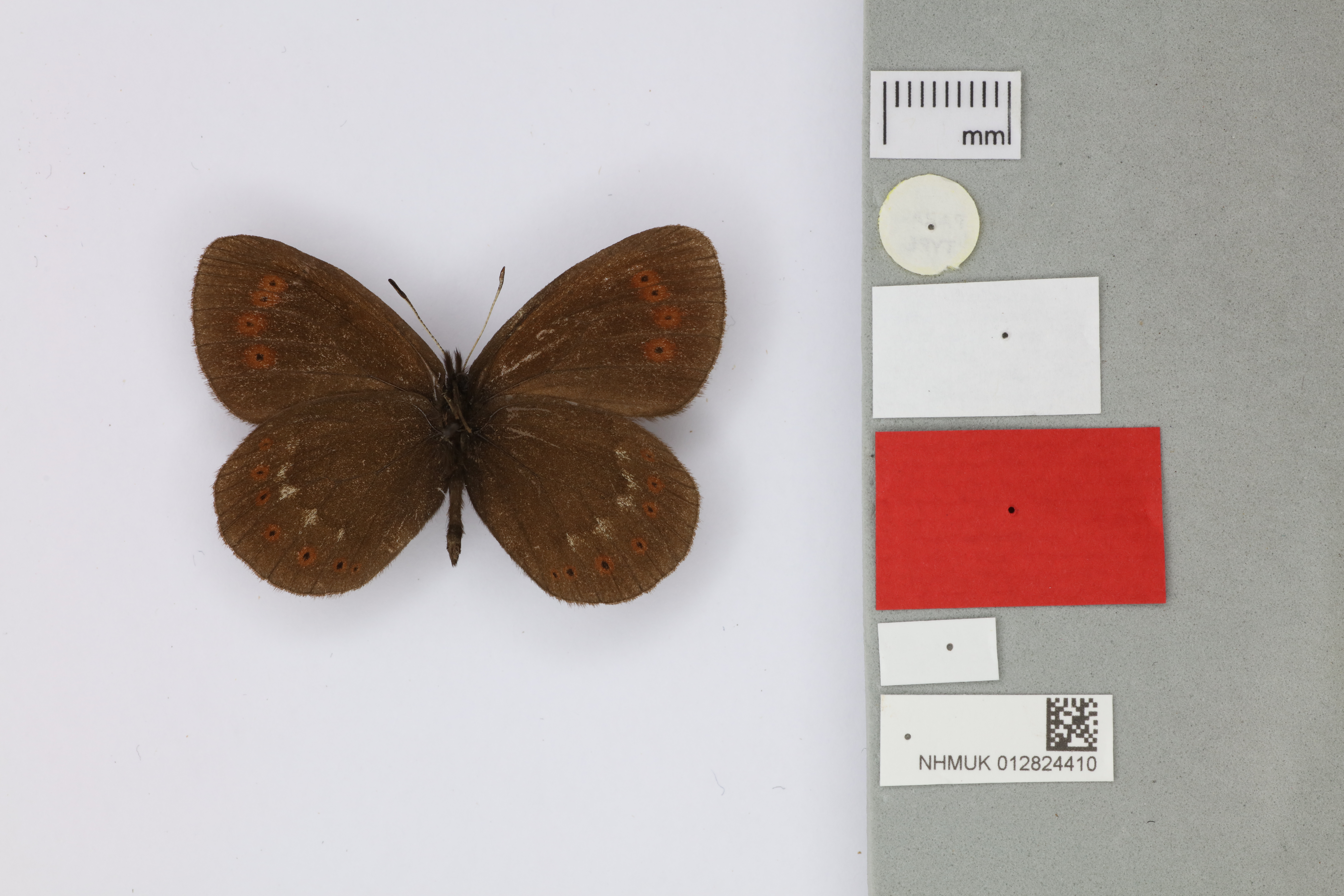
- Erebia meta manuevi Churkin & Zhdanko 2002

Scientific classification
- Kingdom: Animalia
- Phylum: Arthropoda
- Class: Insecta
- Order: Lepidoptera
- Family: Nymphalidae
- Genus: Erebia
- Species: E. meta

Binomial name
- Erebia meta Staudinger, 1886

= Erebia meta =

Species of butterfly

Erebia meta is a member of the subfamily Satyrinae of the family Nymphalidae. It is found from the Alaisky Mts to Tian-Shan ( Lake Issyk-Kul (mountains, Kirghistan (W.Tien-Shan)) at high altitudes.

A species which is very variable in size and pattern. The nymotypical meta Stgr. is of about the same size as ceto. The ground-colour is dark black-brown, before the distal margin there are 4—5 separated, rounded, russet-brown spots bearing black dots. The upper 2 spots, which are a little shifted basad, mostly touch each other, being sometimes confluent. The hindwing has 5, more rarely 6, roundish brown spots with black dots. On the underside of the forewing the brown borders of the dots are somewhat widened and the distal area bearing these spots is somewhat washed with brown. On the underside of the hindwing there is between the ocelli and the cell a row of white transverse bars which stand on the veins. These markings are very variable, the white transverse bars being quite obsolete in many specimens, while in other individuals, especially in females, the white scaling is widened and forms a narrow irrugular white transverse band. Antenna finely ringed above, whitish beneath, the club black- brown with reddish yellow tip. In July on the alpine meadows in the mountains of Osh in East Turkestan, and in the Altai. The form mopsos Stgr., from Namangan in Turkestan, has the dull red spots bearing the black eye-spots longer and broader than nymotypical meta the spots being sometimes confluent, forming an irregular russet-red distal band. On the underside, however, the black dots have but narrow brown borders; the dots on the hindwing beneath are smaller than above and sometimes situated in narrow brown rings, but are mostly without these rings. The black dots are very prominent in the distal area, which is somewhat variegated with grey. Before the darker median area there is an obsolescent white- grey transverse band. The female is reddish brown on the forewing, the margins being narrowly dark brown and the forewing beneath is dull red-brown, the fore and distal margins being somewhat darker, with thin grey scaling. The underside of the hindwing grey-brown, the black dots situated in the distal area are but small and have thin brown borders. The white-grey, somewhat dentate median band is rather broad.
