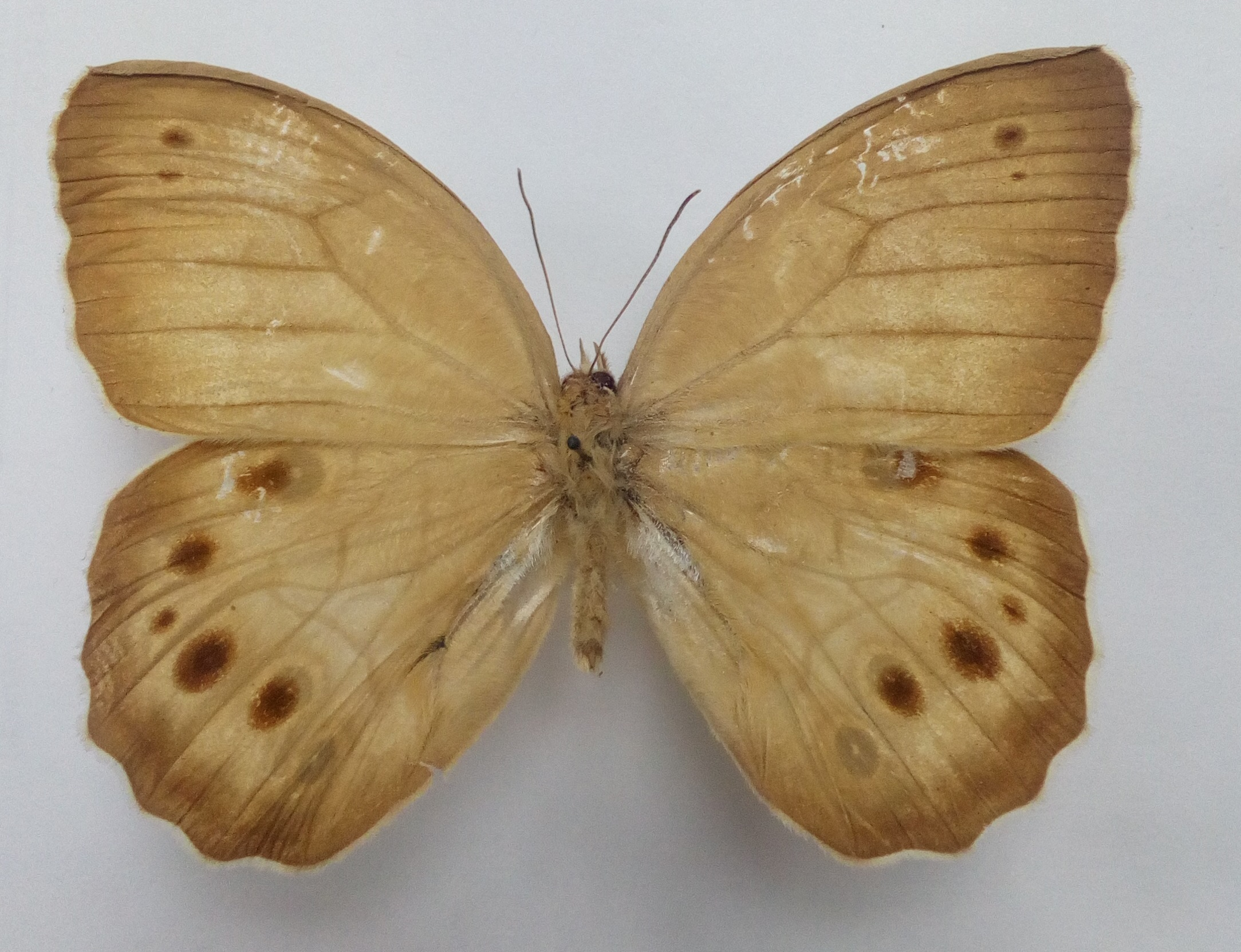
- Ninguta schrenckii, Russia

Scientific classification
- Domain: Eukaryota
- Kingdom: Animalia
- Phylum: Arthropoda
- Class: Insecta
- Order: Lepidoptera
- Family: Nymphalidae
- Subfamily: Satyrinae
- Tribe: Satyrini
- Subtribe: Lethina
- Genus: Ninguta; Moore, [1892]
- Species: N. schrenckii

Binomial name
- Ninguta schrenckii (Ménétriés, 1859)

Synonyms
- Aranda Fruhstorfer, 1909; Pronophila schrenckii Ménétriés, 1859; Aranda (Pararge) schrenckii menalcas Fruhstorfer, 1909; Aranda (Pararge) schrenckii damontas Fruhstorfer, 1909; Lethe schrenckii kuatunensis Mell, 1939; Lethe schrenckii obscura Mell, 1942; Aranda schrenckii carexivora Murayama, 1953; Aranda schrenckii iwatensis Okano, 1954; Aranda schrenckii suzukaensis Mori & Murayama, 1954

= Ninguta schrenckii =

Species of butterfly

Ninguta is a monotypic Palearctic butterfly genus in the family Nymphalidae (Satyrinae: Satyrini: Lethina). The genus contains the single species Ninguta schrenckii found in the Russian Far East, Japan, Korea and eastern China.

== Subspecies ==
- Ninguta schrenckii schrenckii
- Ninguta schrenckii carexivora (Murayama, 1953) (Japan)
- Ninguta schrenckii damontas (Fruhstorfer, 1909) (western China: Sichuan)
- Ninguta schrenckii iwatensis (Okano, 1954) (Japan)
- Ninguta schrenckii kuatunensis (Mell, 1939) (Fukien)
- Ninguta schrenckii menalcas (Fruhstorfer, 1909) (Japan)
- Ninguta schrenckii niigatana Murayama, 1965 (Japan)
- Ninguta schrenckii obscura (Mell, 1942)
- Ninguta schrenckii suzukaensis (Mori & Murayama, 1954) (Japan)
