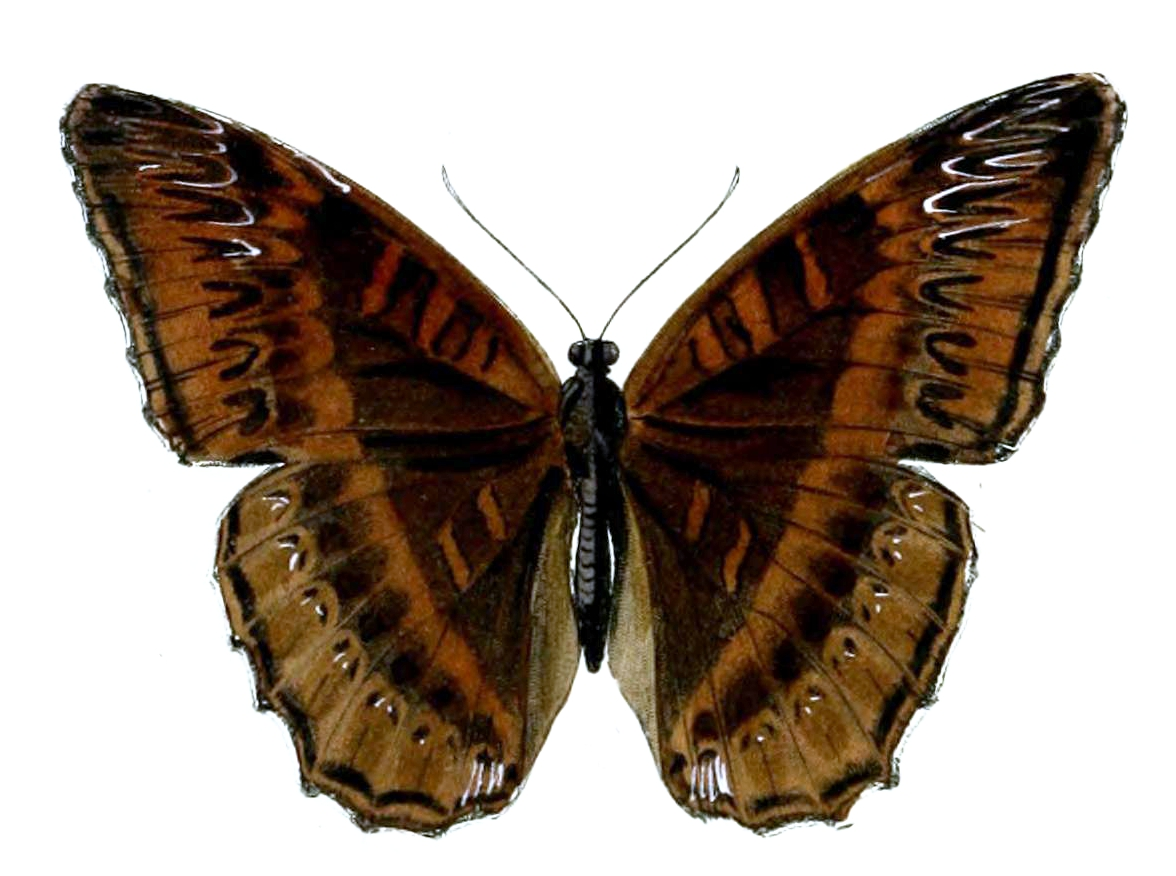

Scientific classification
- Kingdom: Animalia
- Phylum: Arthropoda
- Class: Insecta
- Order: Lepidoptera
- Family: Nymphalidae
- Genus: Limenitis
- Species: L. austenia

Binomial name
- Limenitis austenia (Moore, 1872)

Synonyms
- Lebadea austenia Moore, 1872; Bhagadatta austenia

= Limenitis austenia =

Grey commodore

Species of butterfly

Limenitis austenia (the grey commodore) is a species of nymphalid butterfly found in Asia, ranging from Assam to northern Burma.

== Taxonomy ==
This species has been treated under the genus names of Bhagadatta and Lebadea in the past.

== Subspecies ==
- Limenitis austenia austenia
- Limenitis austenia violetta Miyata & Yoshida, 1995
