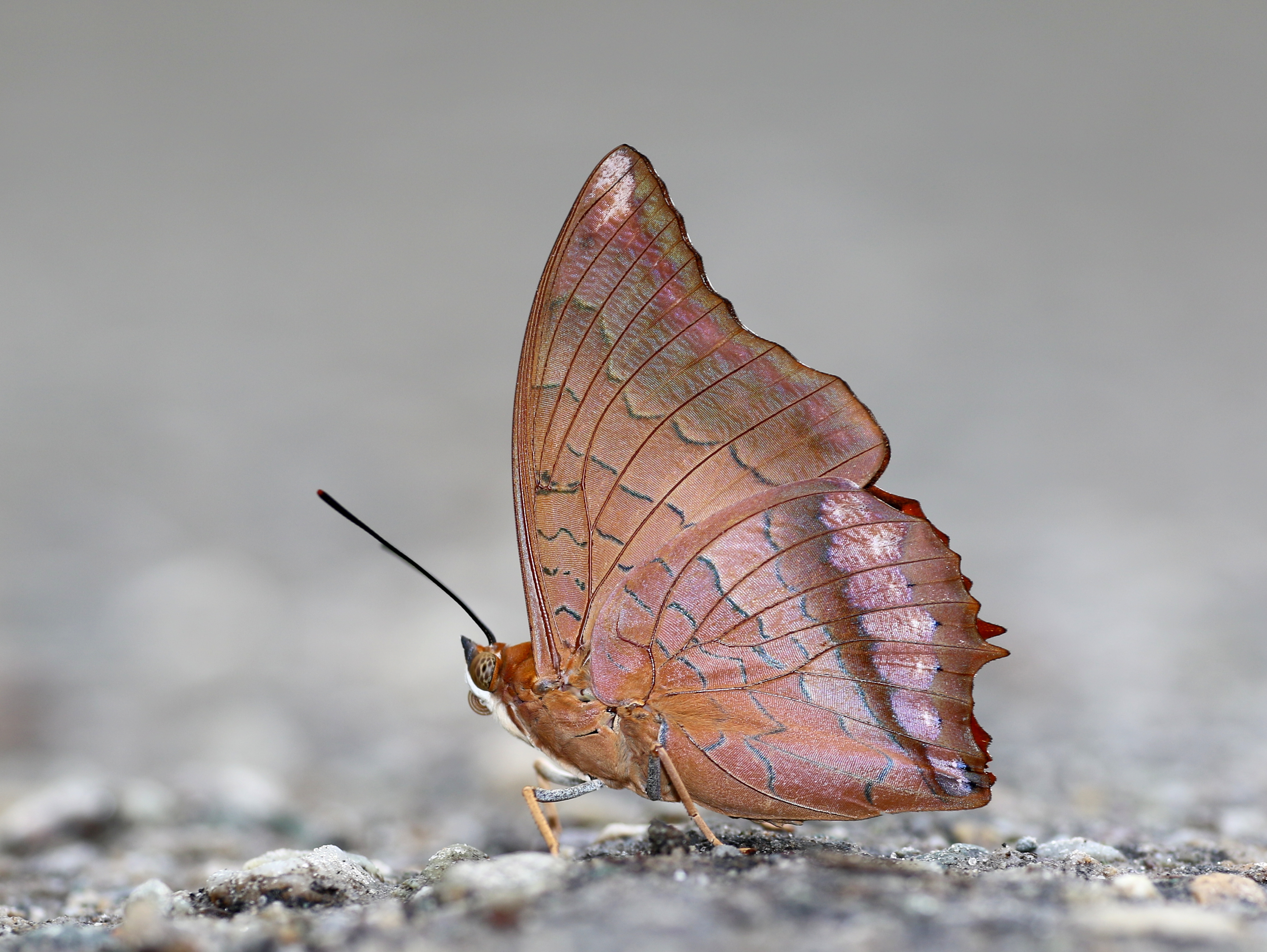

Scientific classification
- Kingdom: Animalia
- Phylum: Arthropoda
- Class: Insecta
- Order: Lepidoptera
- Family: Nymphalidae
- Genus: Charaxes
- Species: C. aristogiton

Binomial name
- Charaxes aristogiton C. Felder, 1867

= Charaxes aristogiton =

Scarce tawny rajah

Species of butterfly

Charaxes aristogiton, the scarce tawny rajah, is a butterfly species found in India and Indochina that belongs to the rajahs and nawabs group, that is, the Charaxinae group of the brush-footed butterflies family.

== Description ==
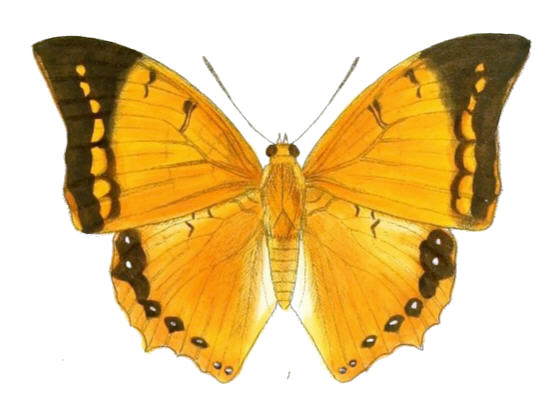
Haridra aristogiton

Resembles Charaxes marmax closely. Male differs with that species with the upperside having the postdiscal transverse band on the forewing black throughout, much more heavily marked, and above vein 4 fused with the black terminal band, traversed by a sub-terminal band of lunules o£ the tawny ground colour, which decrease in size towards the costal margin. On the hindwing the sub-terminal black spots often form a continuous band, decreasing in width posteriorly and separated only by the fulvous veins; in many specimens, however, the posterior spots are separate, but the apical two spots are always fused together and each bears outwardly a more or less conspicuous white spot. On the Underside, the ground colour differs from that in C. marmax in being a purplish tawny with no trace of yellow, but suffused with an iridescent steel-blue tint; the usual slaty-black transverse highly sinuous lines are present; a series of subterminal obscure dark spots anteriorly on the forewing; on the hindwing the oblique postdiscal slaty-black lunular line better defined anteriorly than in C. marmax.

Females differ on the upperside with the postdiscal transverse lunular band on the forewing more heavily marked throughout and much broader anteriorly than in C. marmax and on the underside the ground colour is purplish tawny as in the male but much paler, the basal half of both forewing and hindwing a shade darker than the terminal half, the oblique postdiscal slate-black band on the hindwing broad and outwardly diffuse.

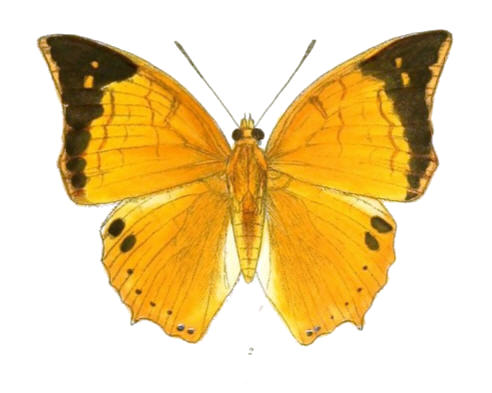
H. a. adamsi

Varieties desa and adamsi, Moore, from southern Burma differ slightly in the width and in the direction of the inner edge of the black terminal band, characters which are very variable even in the forms from Sikkim.

Wingspan of 94–114 mm.

Found in north-eastern India (Sikkim, Assam, Bhutan) and into Burma and Indochina.

== See also ==
- Charaxinae
- Nymphalidae
- List of butterflies of India
- List of butterflies of India (Nymphalidae)
