= Sinonympha =

Scientific classification
- Kingdom: Animalia
- Phylum: Arthropoda
- Class: Insecta
- Order: Lepidoptera
- Family: Nymphalidae
- Subtribe: Coenonymphina
- Genus: Sinonympha; Lee, 1974
- Species: S. amoena

Binomial name
- Sinonympha amoena Lee, 1974

Genus of butterflies

Sinonympha is a monotypic butterfly genus in the family Nymphalidae (subfamily Satyrinae). The genus contains the single species Sinonympha amoena, which is found only in western China.

== Synonymy ==
Sinonympha avinoffi (Schaus, 1927) is conspecific and has date priority.
