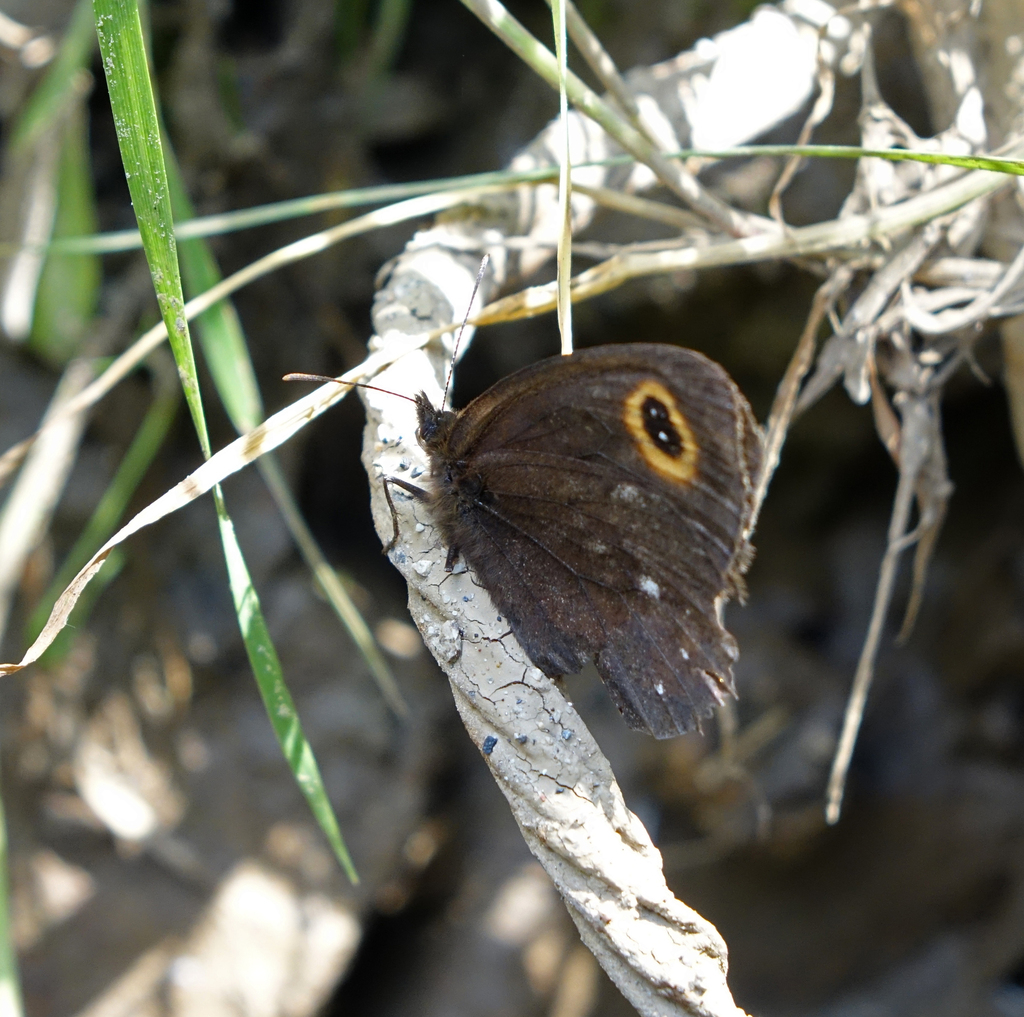

Scientific classification
- Kingdom: Animalia
- Phylum: Arthropoda
- Class: Insecta
- Order: Lepidoptera
- Family: Nymphalidae
- Genus: Erebia
- Species: E. edda

Binomial name
- Erebia edda Ménétriés, 1851

Synonyms
- Erebia jeholana Matsumura 1939; Erebia menetriesi Kardakoff 1928; Erebia semicaeca Kardakoff 1928

= Erebia edda =

Species of butterfly

Erebia edda is a small butterfly found in the East Palearctic (Urals, Altai, Tuva, Siberia, Yakutia, Ussuri, Chukot Peninsula, Mongolia, Korea) that belongs to the browns family.

== Description from Seitz ==
E. edda Men. (= intermedia Trybom) (35 c). Wings above coffee-brown, darker towards the base, distally with a russet-brown sheen. There is before the apex a large rounded reddish yellow spot bearing a black ocellus composed of two and having two small white pupils. The hindwing is without markings. On the forewing beneath the yellow spot is larger and lighter than above, being more ochre -yellow, the double ocellus having bright white pupils. The hindwing beneath dark brown, thinly dusted with whitish, especially towards the costa. At the apex of the cell a rounded white spot, and before the distal margin 3 — 4 white dots. Antenna black-brown above, finely ringed with white and brown beneath, except the russet-brown club. The sexes are the same in markings and size, but the yellow spot of the forewing is paler in the female than in the male. Elwes found some specimens with accessory ocelli below the large subapical ocellus. — This species is the first of that group of Erebias which come nearest to the preceding genus (Callerebia). It resembles Callerebia also in that it is not a really alpine insect, but occurs more in the hills. In East Siberia, in the Amur-district according to Graeser in June and July in swampy woods, but rare. Very local in the Altai, but abundant in some places, occurring already as low down as 4000 ft. It flutters with a weak flight among the grass, always setting on stones in dry brooks.

== See also ==
- List of butterflies of Europe
