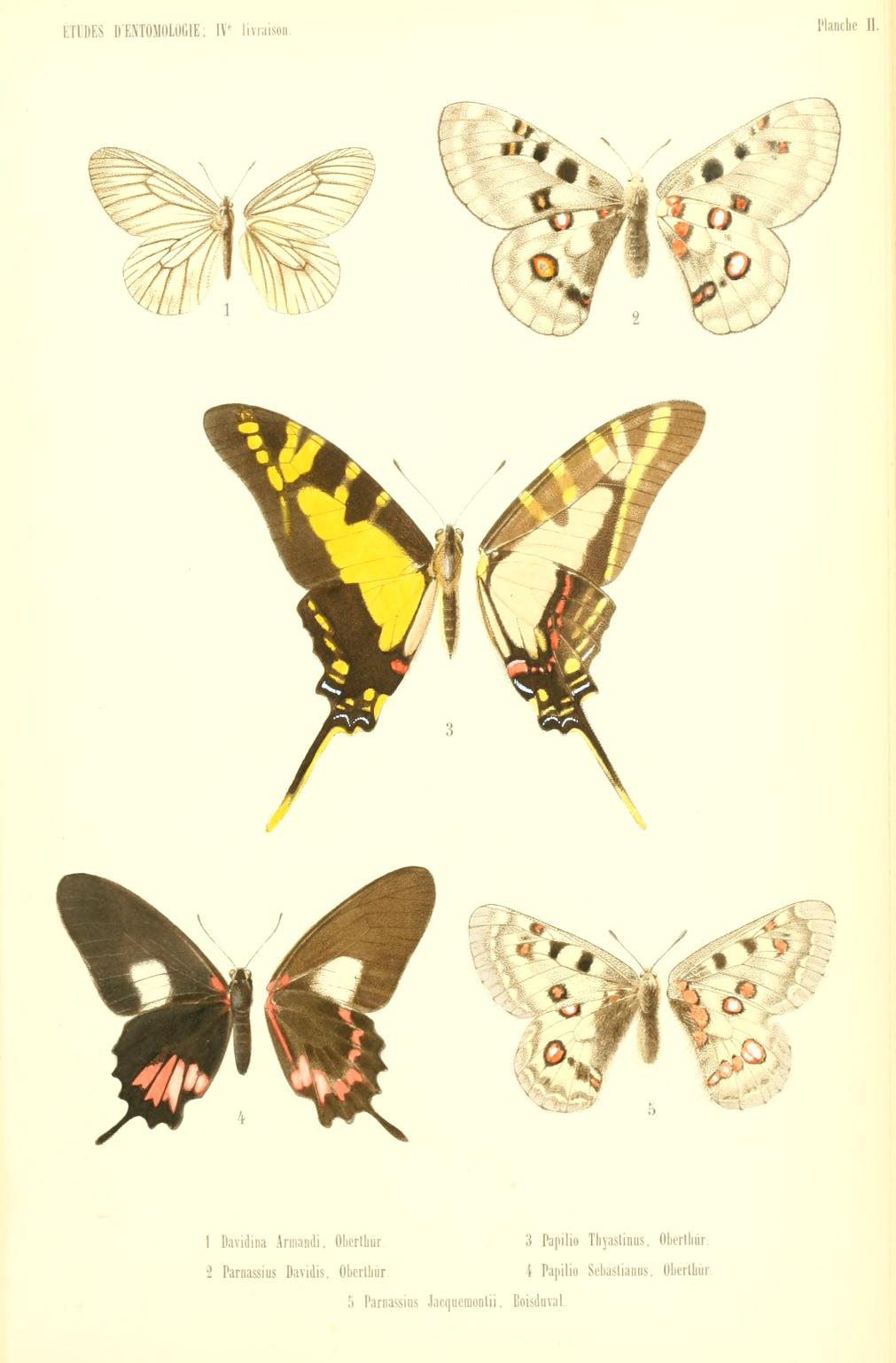
- Davidina armandi in Charles Oberthür's Études d'entomologie

Scientific classification
- Domain: Eukaryota
- Kingdom: Animalia
- Phylum: Arthropoda
- Class: Insecta
- Order: Lepidoptera
- Family: Nymphalidae
- Subtribe: Satyrina
- Genus: Davidina; Oberthür, 1879

Synonyms
- Leechia Röber, [1907] (preocc. South, 1901); Sinosatyrus Lee, 1988

= Davidina =

Genus of butterflies

Davidina is a genus of butterflies in the family Nymphalidae (subfamily Satyrinae). They occur in northeast and central China.

== Species ==
Species include:

- Davidina armandi Oberthür, 1879 (northeast China: Shanxi)
- Davidina alticola Röber, [1907] (central China: Shaanxi)
