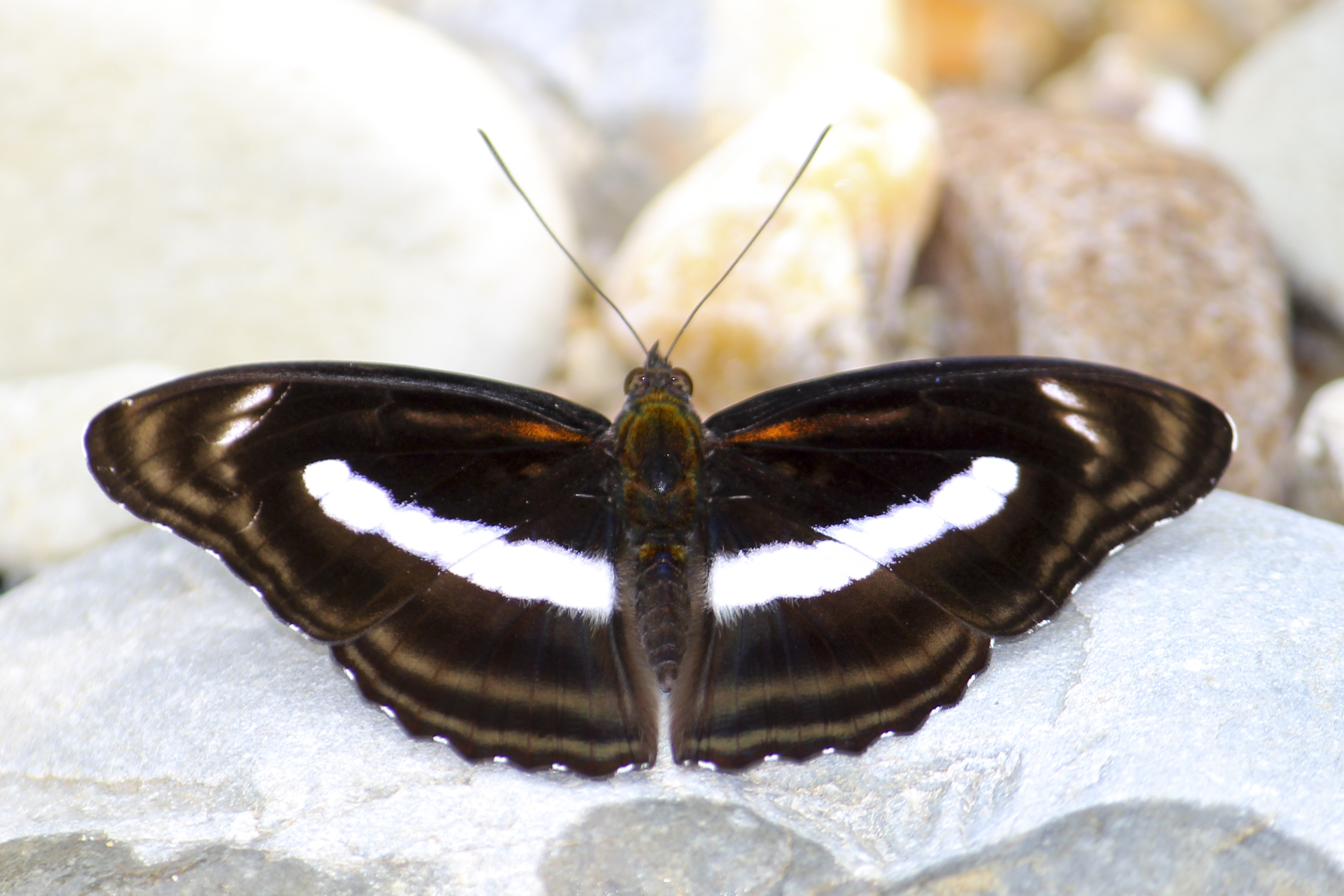

Scientific classification
- Domain: Eukaryota
- Kingdom: Animalia
- Phylum: Arthropoda
- Class: Insecta
- Order: Lepidoptera
- Family: Nymphalidae
- Genus: Athyma
- Species: A. zeroca

Binomial name
- Athyma zeroca Moore, 1872

= Athyma zeroca =

Small staff sergeant

Species of butterfly

Athyma zeroca, the small staff sergeant, is a species of nymphalid butterfly found in tropical and subtropical Asia.

== Description ==
Male upperside superficially resembles the upperside of Athyma selenophora; but on the forewing the discoidal streak is more obscure, the three obliquely placed white spots composing the anterior portion of the discal band are pre-apically transverse on the wing and are sometimes not white but fuliginous brown; the postdiscal and subterminal lines on the hindwing are more continuous. Underside also resembles, but more closely, the underside of A. selenophora male, but the ground colour is darker, the discoidal streak and transverse preapical spots on the forewing and the postdiscal and subterminal lines on the hindwing lilac, the latter two more continuous, not macular.

Female altogether different. Upperside fuliginous brown with diffuse sullied white markings. Forewing with the discoidal streak long and undivided; beyond apex of cell an elongate narrow triangular spot: discal band long and narrow posteriorly and very oblique, extending in interspace 3 diffusely to the inner subterminal band; the three spots composing its anterior portion also very oblique; the inner subterminal band broad and distinct; outer subterminal band distinct only posteriorly. Hindwing with the usual subbasal. postdiscal and subterminal bands, the former two sullied white, the postdiscal very diffuse, the subterminal pale brown. Underside ochraceous brown, the sullied white markings as on the upperside, a series of dark ferruginous diffuse marks resembling stains from near apex of forewing to dorsal margin of hindwing; this last broadly bluish.

Antennae, head, thorax and abdomen dark brown; beneath, palpi, thorax and abdomen white suffused with pale blue. The usual abdominal bar at base above.

== See also ==
- List of butterflies of India
- List of butterflies of India (Nymphalidae)
