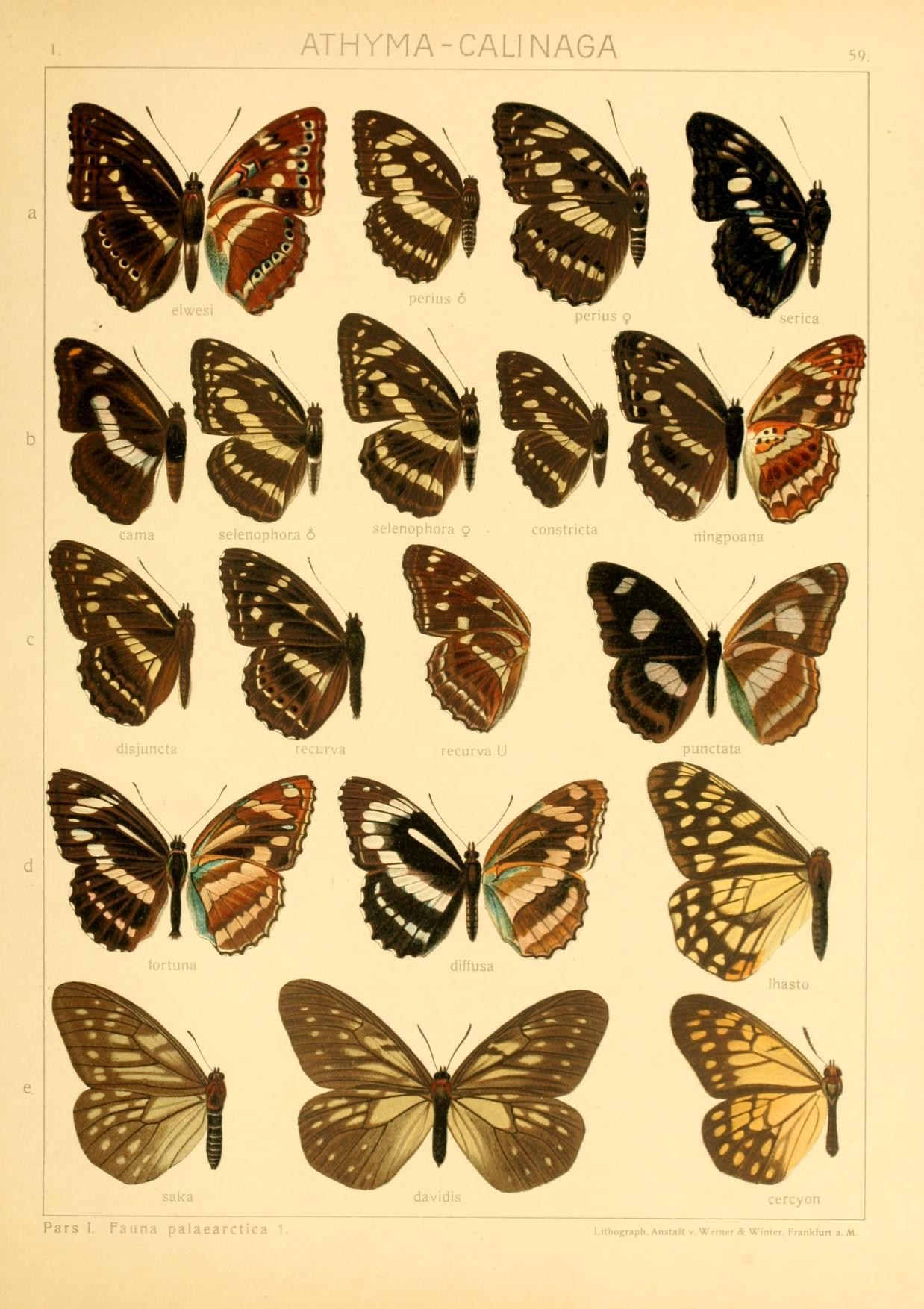
- Athyma recurva in Seitz (59c)

Scientific classification
- Domain: Eukaryota
- Kingdom: Animalia
- Phylum: Arthropoda
- Class: Insecta
- Order: Lepidoptera
- Family: Nymphalidae
- Genus: Athyma
- Species: A. recurva

Binomial name
- Athyma recurva Leech, 1893

= Athyma recurva =

Species of butterfly

Athyma recurva is a butterfly found in the Palearctic that belongs to the browns family. It is endemic to China (West China and Tibet).

== Description from Seitz ==
P. recurva Leech (59c). Similar to the preceding [Athyma disjuncta Leech, 1890], but the cell-spots of the forewing different and the exterior macular band of the hindwing is nearer the margin. Underside red-brown, the spots as above, but better developed, on the hindwing there runs a white curved stripe along the costal vein from the base to the first spot of the discal band, which it sometimes joins. The edges of the band rather straight, but the exterior edge may also be dentate, otherwise only transected by the dark veins. The female is larger and bears enlarged white spots. Appears to be very rare. — West China: Moupin, Wa-shan, in June.
