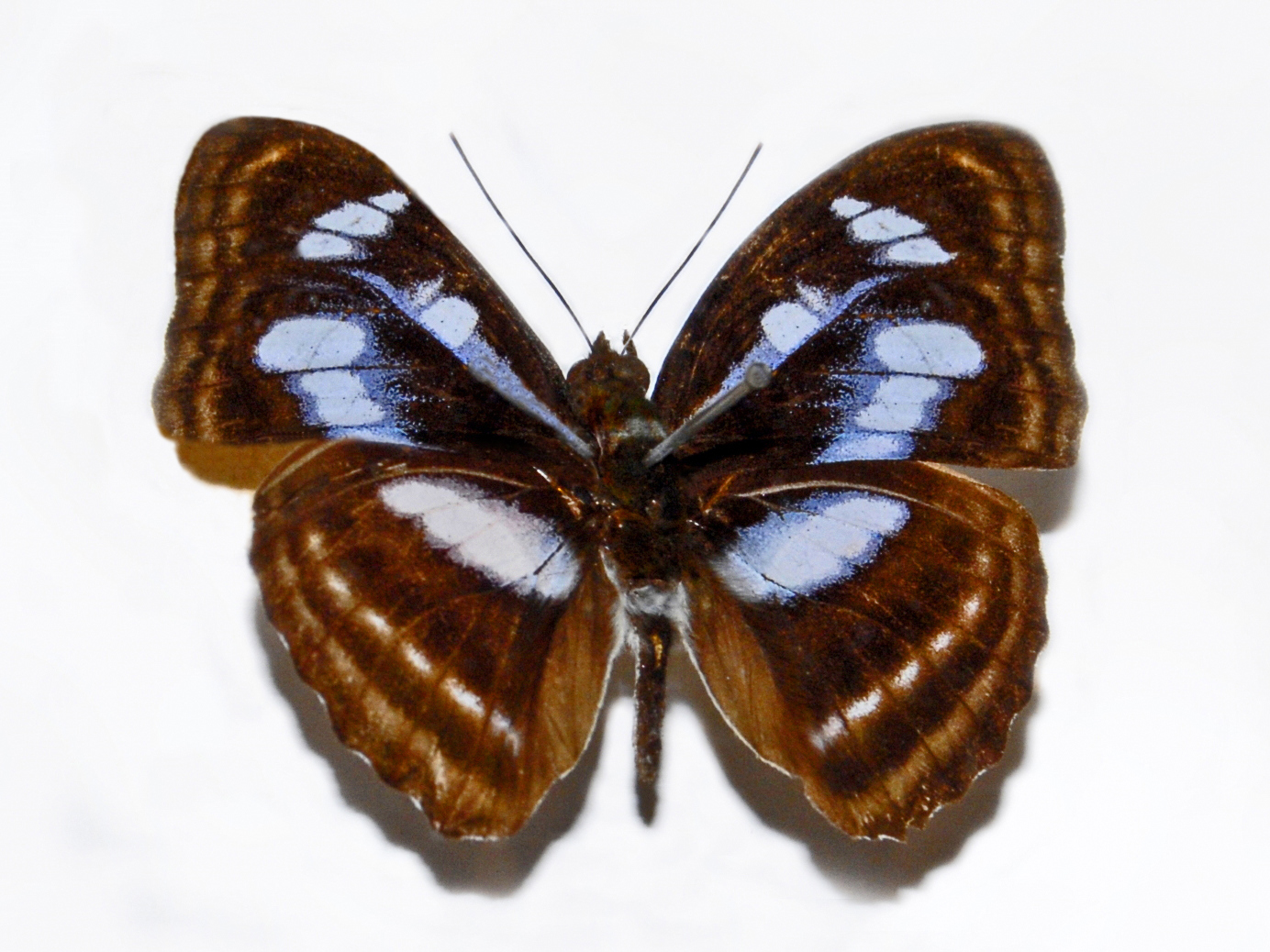
- Specimen on display at the Museo Civico di Storia Naturale di Trieste

Scientific classification
- Kingdom: Animalia
- Phylum: Arthropoda
- Class: Insecta
- Order: Lepidoptera
- Family: Nymphalidae
- Genus: Athyma
- Species: A. glora

Binomial name
- Athyma glora Kheil, 1884

= Athyma glora =

Species of butterfly

Athyma glora is a species of nymphalid butterfly.

== Description ==
Athyma glora has a wingspan of about 50–60 millimetres (2.0–2.4 in). The upperside of the wings is black or dark brown, with blue-white markings. It seems quite similar to Athyma cama.

== Distribution ==
This species can be found on Nias Island in Indonesia.

== Bibliography ==
- Kheil, N.M. (1884). Zur Fauna des Indo-Malayischen Archipels. Die Rhoplalocera der Insel Nias Rhopalocera Ins. Nias: [1-5], 6-38, 5pls. Berlin
- The Journal of the Asiatic Society of Bengal
