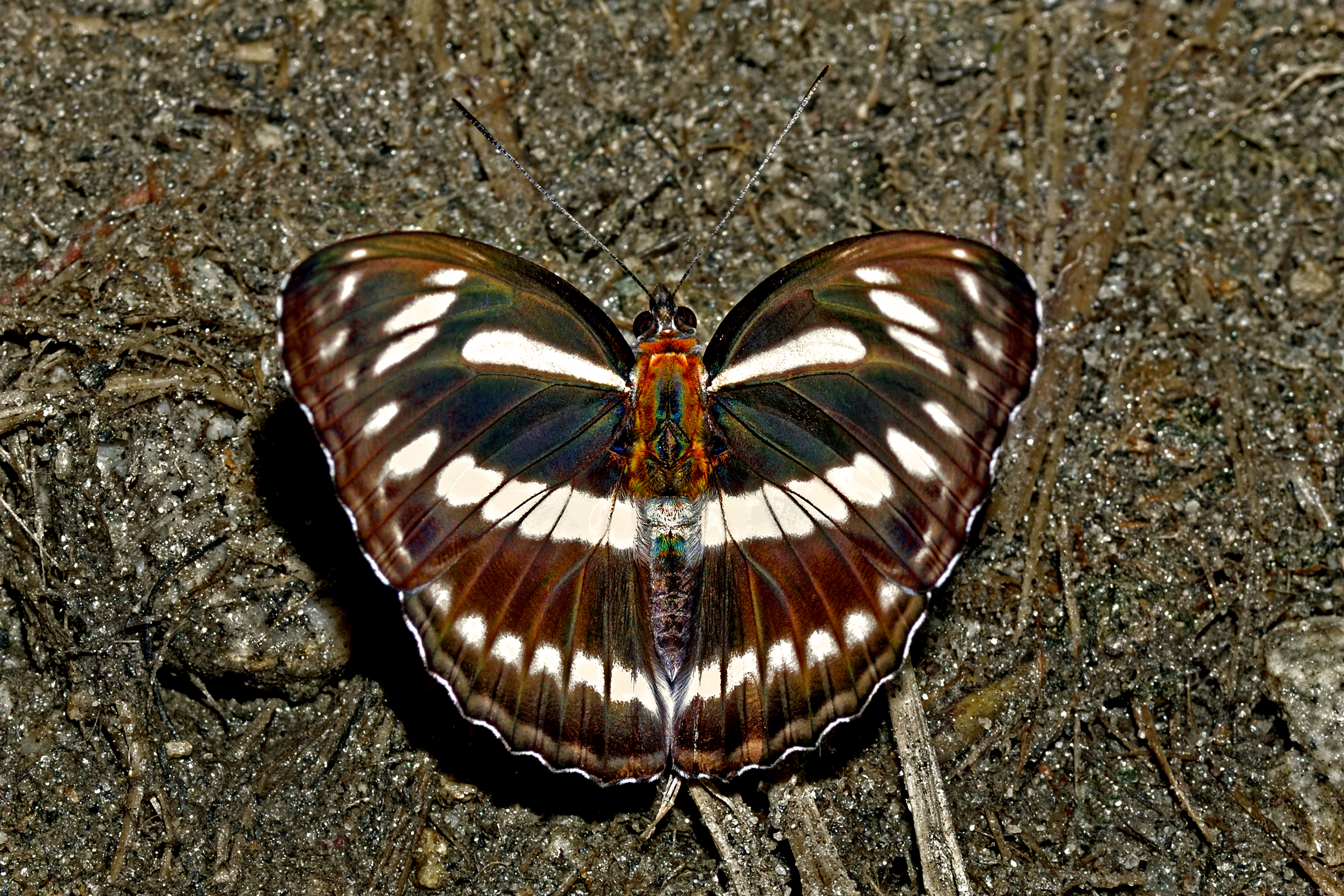
- upper side
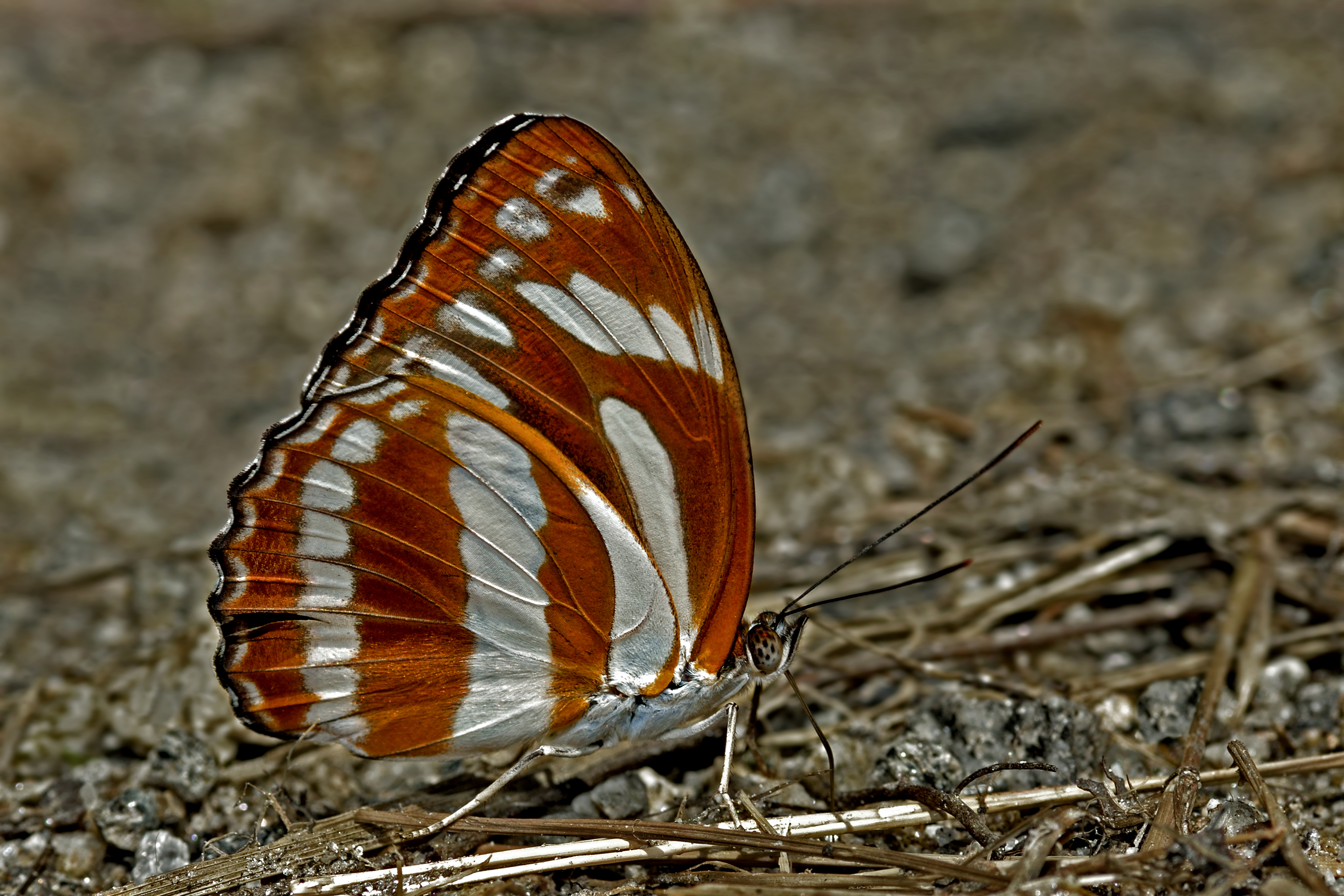
- underside

Scientific classification
- Domain: Eukaryota
- Kingdom: Animalia
- Phylum: Arthropoda
- Class: Insecta
- Order: Lepidoptera
- Family: Nymphalidae
- Genus: Athyma
- Species: A. jina

Binomial name
- Athyma jina Moore, 1858

= Athyma jina =

Bhutan sergeant

Species of butterfly

Athyma jina, the Bhutan sergeant, is a species of nymphalid butterfly found in tropical and subtropical Asia.
