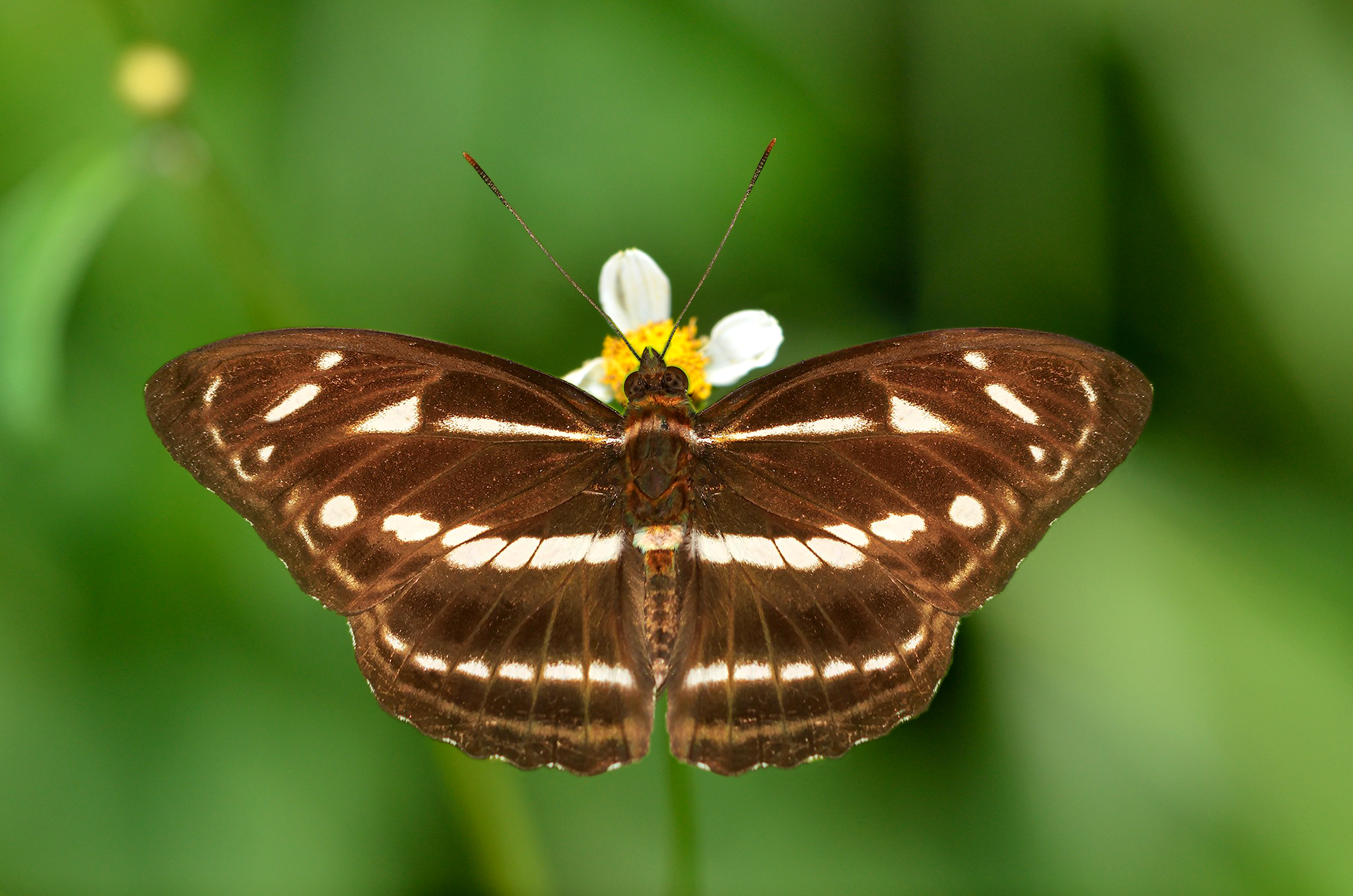

Scientific classification
- Domain: Eukaryota
- Kingdom: Animalia
- Phylum: Arthropoda
- Class: Insecta
- Order: Lepidoptera
- Family: Nymphalidae
- Genus: Athyma
- Species: A. kanwa

Binomial name
- Athyma kanwa Moore, 1858

= Athyma kanwa =

Dot-dash sergeant

Species of butterfly

Athyma kanwa, the dot-dash sergeant, is a species of brush-footed butterfly found in tropical and subtropical Asia and Cambodia.
