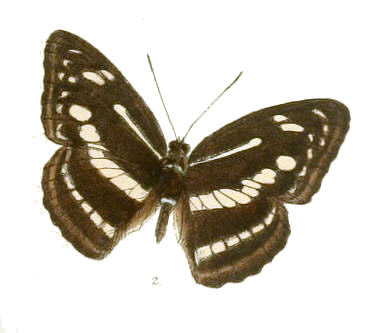

Scientific classification
- Kingdom: Animalia
- Phylum: Arthropoda
- Class: Insecta
- Order: Lepidoptera
- Family: Nymphalidae
- Genus: Athyma
- Species: A. pravara

Binomial name
- Athyma pravara Moore, 1857

= Athyma pravara =

Unbroken sergeant

Species of butterfly

Athyma pravara, the unbroken sergeant, is a species of brush-footed butterfly found in tropical and subtropical Asia.
