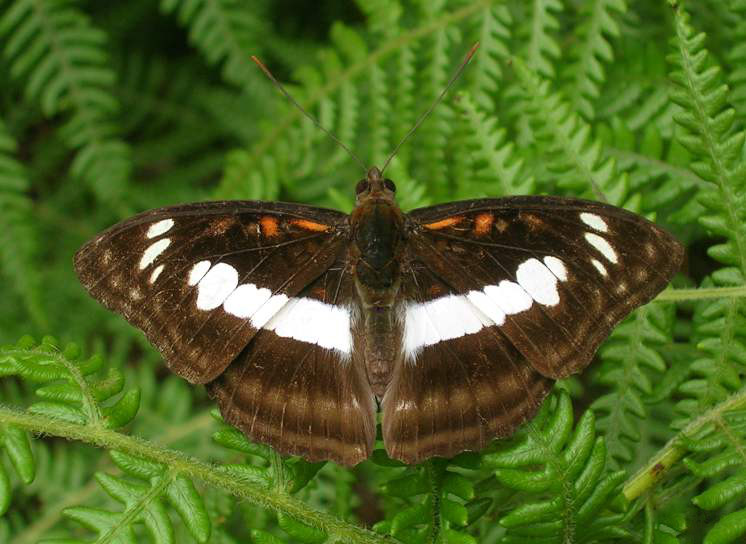
- Staff sergeant (Athyma selenophora); Tadiandamol, Kodagu (Coorg) district, Karnataka, India

Scientific classification
- Domain: Eukaryota
- Kingdom: Animalia
- Phylum: Arthropoda
- Class: Insecta
- Order: Lepidoptera
- Family: Nymphalidae
- Tribe: Limenitidini
- Genus: Athyma; Westwood, [1850]

Synonyms
- Balanga Moore, [1898]; Chendrana Moore, [1898]; Condochates Moore, [1898]; Kironga Moore, [1898]; Parathyma Moore, [1898]; Pseudohypolimnas Moore, [1898]; Sabania Moore, [1898]; Tacola Moore, [1898]; Tacoraea Moore, [1898]; Tatisia Moore, [1898]; Tharasia Moore, [1898]; Zabana Moore, [1898]; Zamboanga Moore, [1898]

= Athyma =

Genus of brush-footed butterflies

Athyma is a genus of brush-footed butterflies. They are commonly known as the "true" or "typical" sergeants, to distinguish them from the false sergeants of the genus Pseudathyma, a fairly close relative from the Adoliadini tribe. The genus ranges from Tibet to the Solomon Islands, but does not occur in New Guinea or Australia.

== Species ==
Listed alphabetically:

- Athyma abiasa Moore, 1858
- Athyma alcamene C. & R. Felder, 1863
- Athyma adunora
- Athyma arayata C. & R. Felder, 1863
- Athyma asura Moore, 1858 – studded sergeant
  - Athyma asura baelia (Fruhstorfer, 1908)
- Athyma cama Moore, 1858 – orange staff sergeant
  - Athyma cama zoroastes (Butler, 1877)
- Athyma cosmia Semper, 1878
- Athyma disjuncta Leech, 1890
- Athyma epimethis C. & R. Felder, 1863
- Athyma eulimene (Godart, [1824])
- Athyma eupolia Murayama & Shimonoya, 1962
- Athyma fortuna Leech, 1889
  - Athyma fortuna kodahirai (Sonan, 1938)
- Athyma glora Kheil, 1884
- Athyma godmani Staudinger, 1889
- Athyma gutama Moore, 1858
- Athyma inara Doubleday, 1850 – colour sergeant
- Athyma jagori Fruhstorfer, 1906
- Athyma jina Moore, 1857 – Bhutan sergeant
  - Athyma jima sauteri (Fruhstorfer, 1912)
- Athyma kanwa Moore, 1858 – dot-dash sergeant
- Athyma karita Doherty, 1891
- Athyma kasa Moore, 1858
- Athyma larymna (Doubleday, [1848]) – great sergeant
- Athyma libnites (Hewitson, 1859)
- Athyma nefte (Cramer, [1780]) – colour sergeant
- Athyma maenas C. & R. Felder, 1863
- Athyma magindana Semper, 1878
- Athyma matanga Fruhstorfer, 1905
- Athyma marguritha Fruhstorfer, 1898
- Athyma mindanica Murayama, 1978
- Athyma minensis Yoshino, 1997
- Athyma opalina (Kollar, [1844]) – Himalayan sergeant
  - Athyma opalina hirayamai (Matsumura, 1935)
- Athyma orientalis Elwes, 1888
- Athyma perius (Linnaeus, 1758) – common sergeant
- Athyma pravara Moore, 1857 – unbroken sergeant
- Athyma punctata Leech, 1890
- Athyma ranga Moore, 1857 – blackvein sergeant
- Athyma recurva Leech, 1893
- Athyma reta Moore, 1858 – Malay staff sergeant
- Athyma rufula de Nicéville, [1889] – Andaman sergeant
- Athyma selenophora (Kollar, [1844]) – staff sergeant
  - Athyma selenophora laela (Fruhstorfer, 1908)
- Athyma separata Staudinger, 1889
- Athyma speciosa Staudinger, 1889
- Athyma sulpitia (Cramer, [1779]) – spotted sergeant
- Athyma zeroca Moore, 1872 – small staff sergeant
