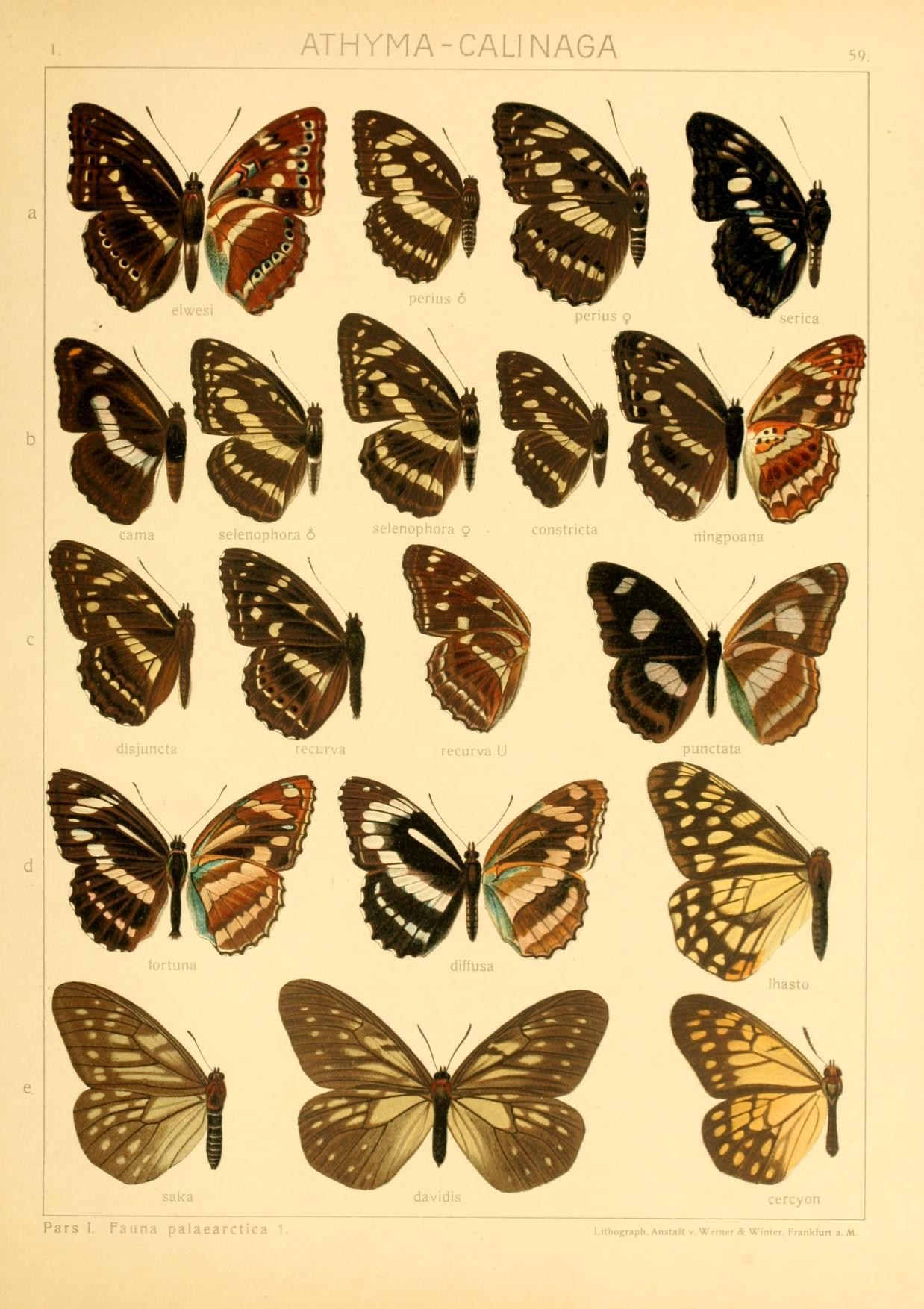
- Athyma punctata in Seitz (59c male)

Scientific classification
- Domain: Eukaryota
- Kingdom: Animalia
- Phylum: Arthropoda
- Class: Insecta
- Order: Lepidoptera
- Family: Nymphalidae
- Genus: Athyma
- Species: A. recurva

Binomial name
- Athyma recurva Leech, 1890

= Athyma punctata =

Species of butterfly

Athyma punctata is a butterfly found in the Palearctic that belongs to the browns family. It is endemic to China (West China and Tibet).

== Description from Seitz ==
P. punctata Leech (59c) differs in facies entirely from the other species of the genus, bearing above on a black ground whitish violet spots, which recall Hypolimnas misippus as in the case of Limenitis albomaculata. The underside is brownish, markings similar as above, but broader, and the discal spot of the hindwing is enlarged to a broad band. The female (61c) is essentially different, the brownish markings on a dark ground more bearing the general character of the genus. — Central China: Chang-Yang; West China: Ta-tsien-lu, Moupin.

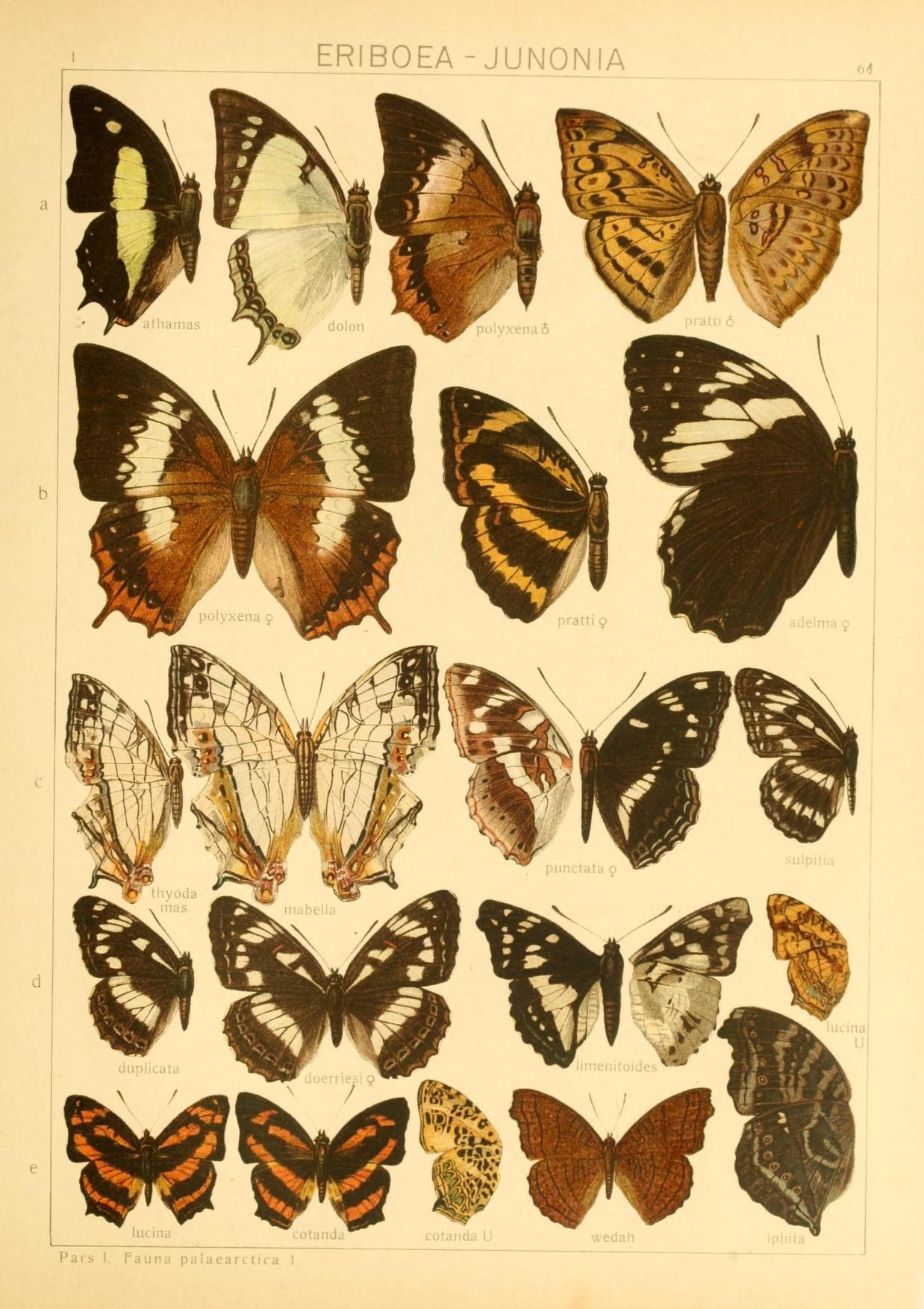
female Seitz 61c

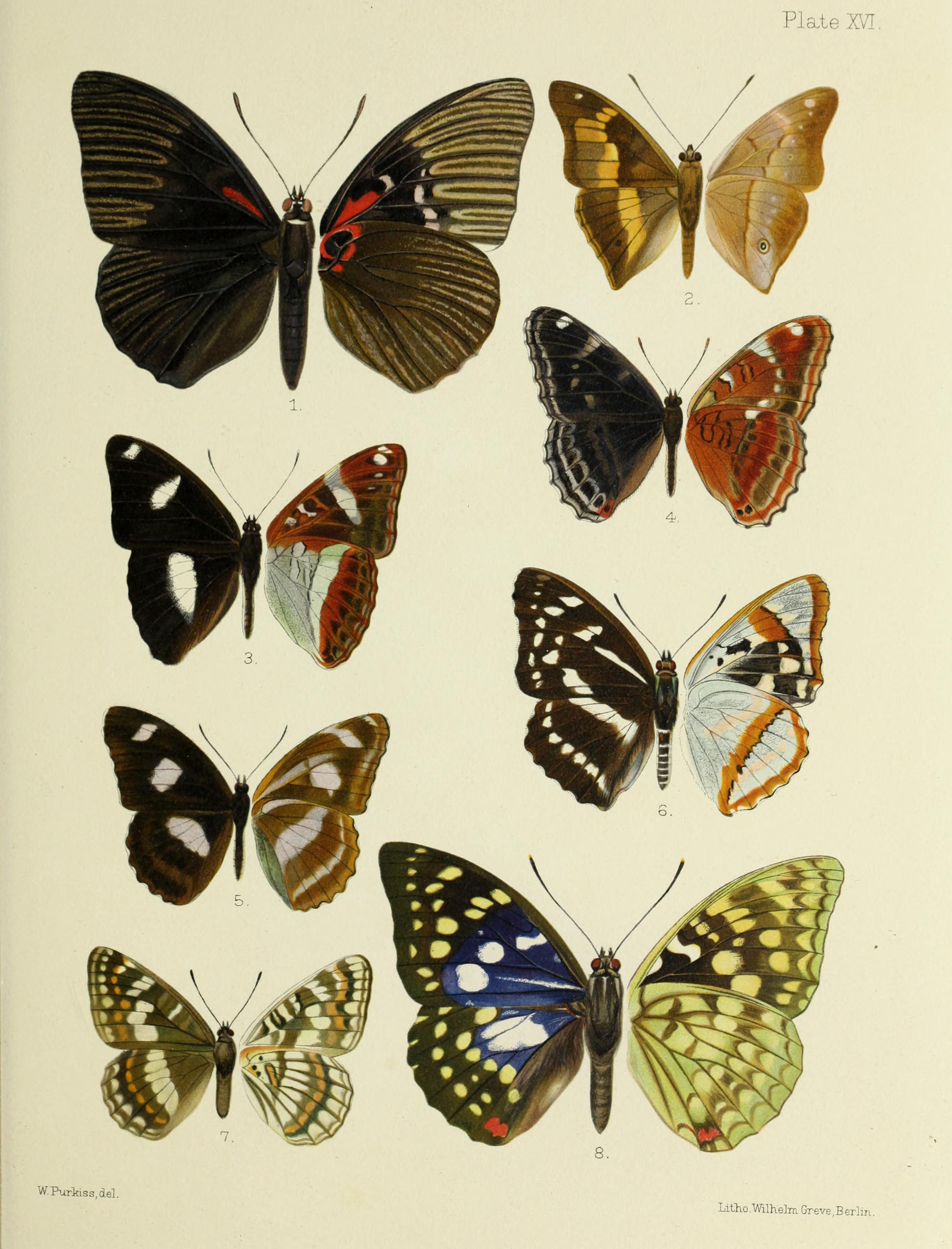
in Leech Butterflies from China, Japan and Corea (fig.5)
