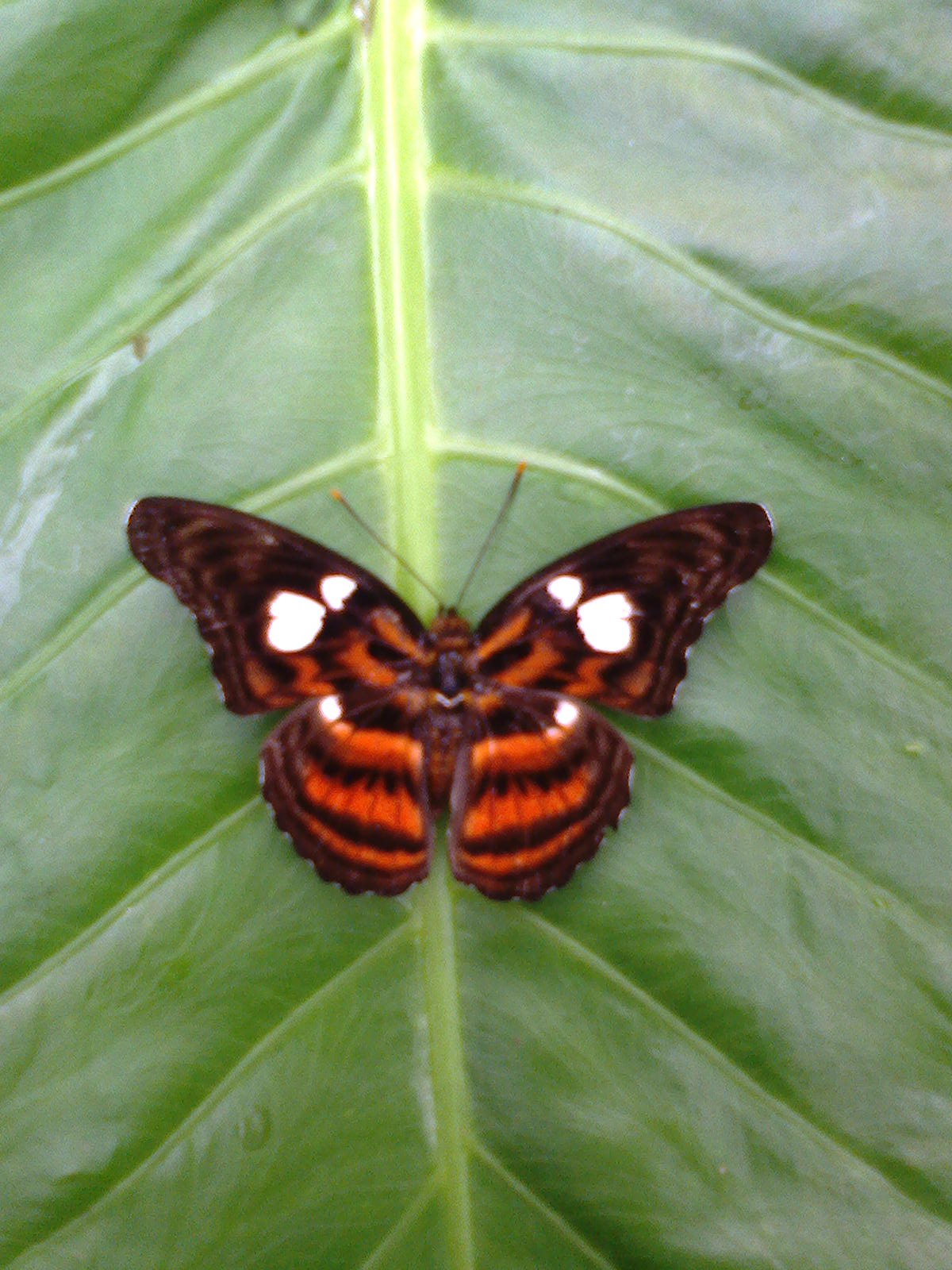
- Male
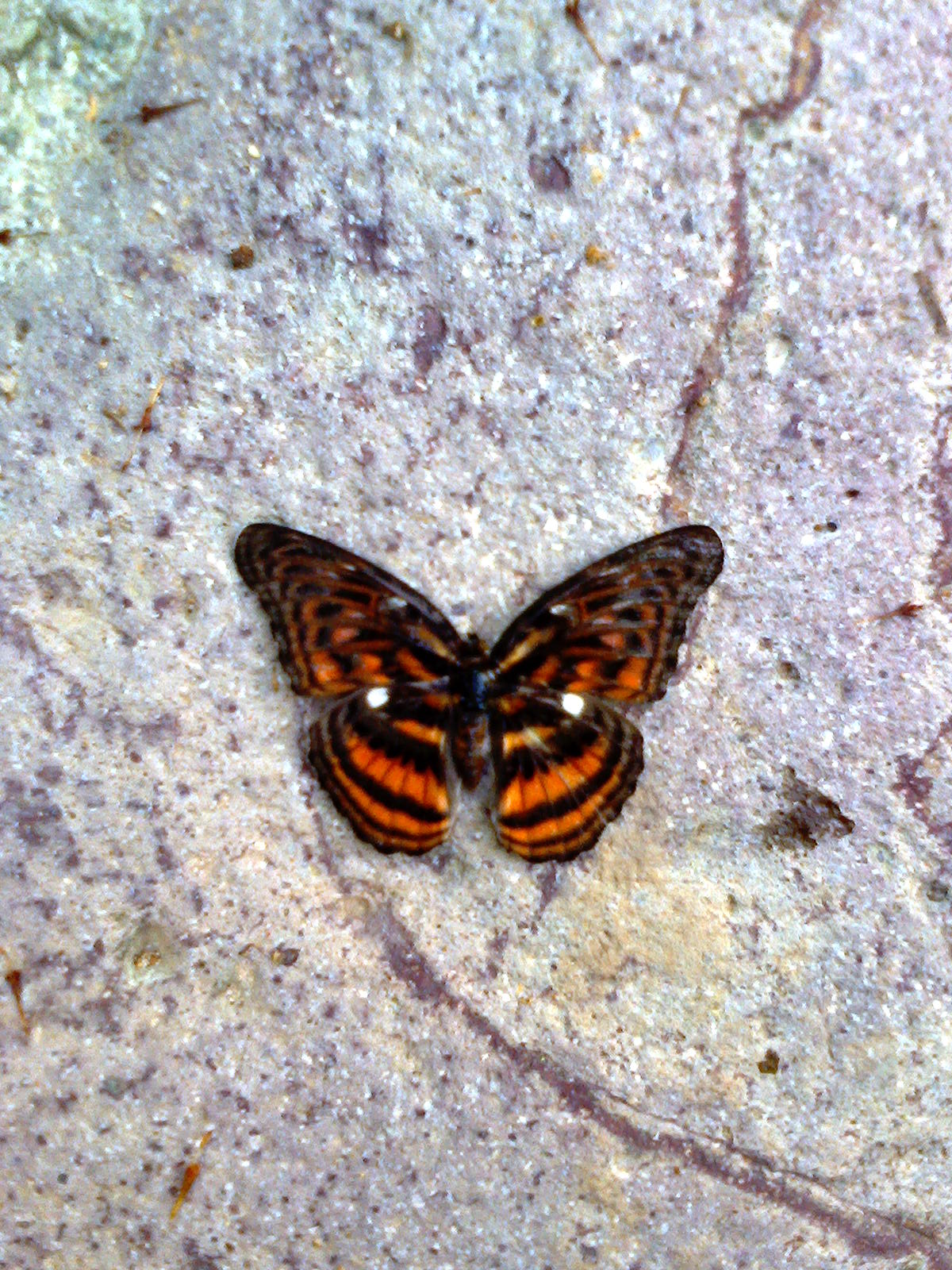
- Female; Both from Sungai Pontolo, North Gorontalo, Sulawesi

Scientific classification
- Domain: Eukaryota
- Kingdom: Animalia
- Phylum: Arthropoda
- Class: Insecta
- Order: Lepidoptera
- Family: Nymphalidae
- Genus: Athyma
- Species: A. libnites

Binomial name
- Athyma libnites (Hewitson, 1859)

Synonyms
- Limenitis libnites Hewitson, 1859

= Athyma libnites =

Species of butterfly

Athyma libnites is butterfly endemic to Sulawesi, Indonesia. It was described by William Chapman Hewitson in 1859.

== Subspecies ==
- A. l. libnites (Sulawesi)
- A. l. noctesco Tsukada, 1991 (Buton)
- A. l. nieuwenhuisi Hanafusa, 1989 (Banggai)
