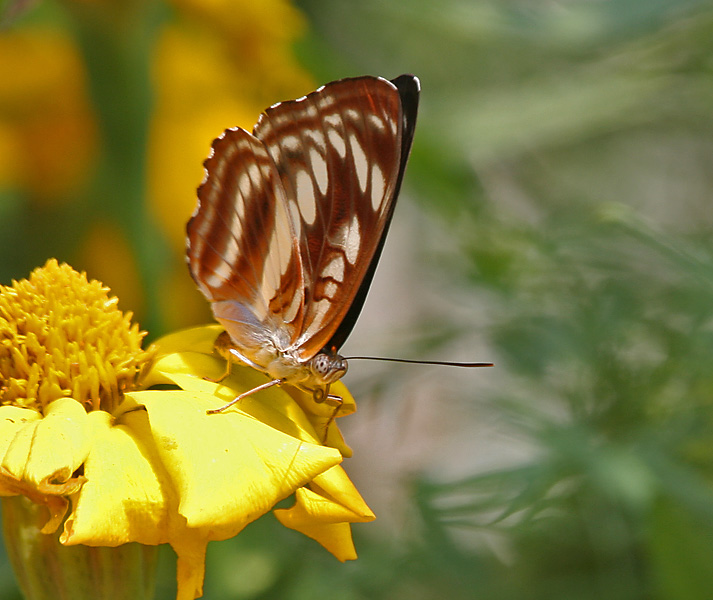
- At Jayanti in Buxa Tiger Reserve in Jalpaiguri district of West Bengal, India.

Scientific classification
- Kingdom: Animalia
- Phylum: Arthropoda
- Clade: Pancrustacea
- Class: Insecta
- Order: Lepidoptera
- Family: Nymphalidae
- Genus: Athyma
- Species: A. opalina

Binomial name
- Athyma opalina (Kollar, 1844)

= Athyma opalina =

Himalayan sergeant

Species of butterfly

Athyma opalina, the Himalayan sergeant, is a species of large, tailess nymphalid butterfly found in tropical and subtropical evergreen forest regions in Asia (India, Pakistan, Nepal, Bangladesh and Bhutan), usually at an elevation of 1200 meters to 3000 meters. A. opalina has a wingspan of 57 millimeters to 72 millimeters. Athyma opalina primary color is black with white as an associated color. Other colors on Athyma opalina include red, brown and orange.

Adults of this species feed on nectar, sap and sometimes decaying organic matter while larvae feed on some trees and grasses. They live for 12 months.

== Gallery ==
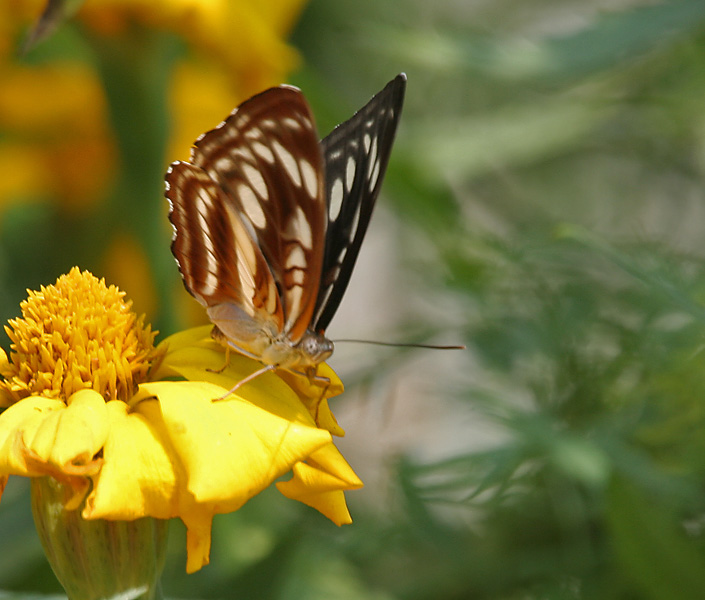
At Jayanti in Buxa Tiger Reserve in Jalpaiguri district of West Bengal, India.

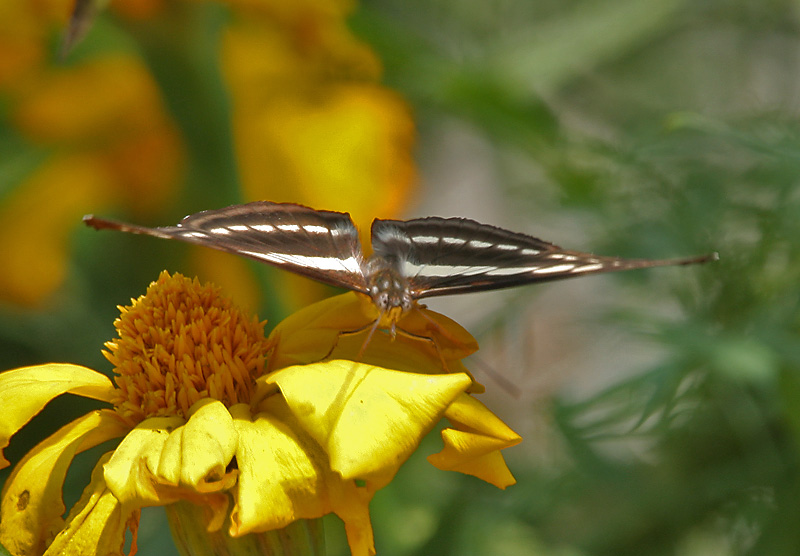
At Jayanti in Buxa Tiger Reserve.

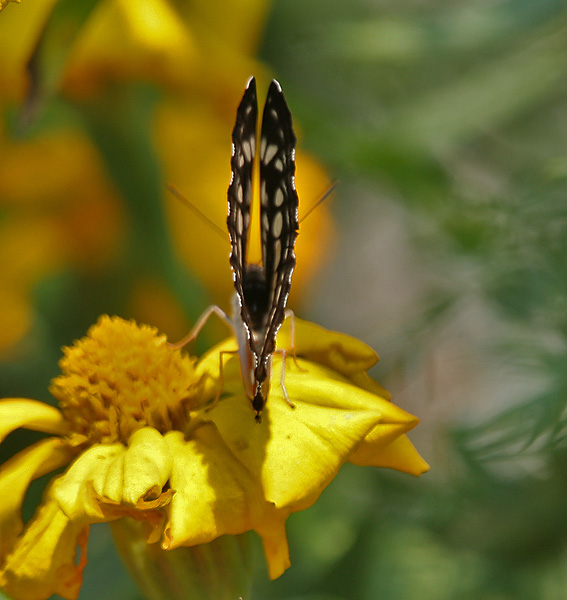
At Jayanti in Buxa Tiger Reserve.
