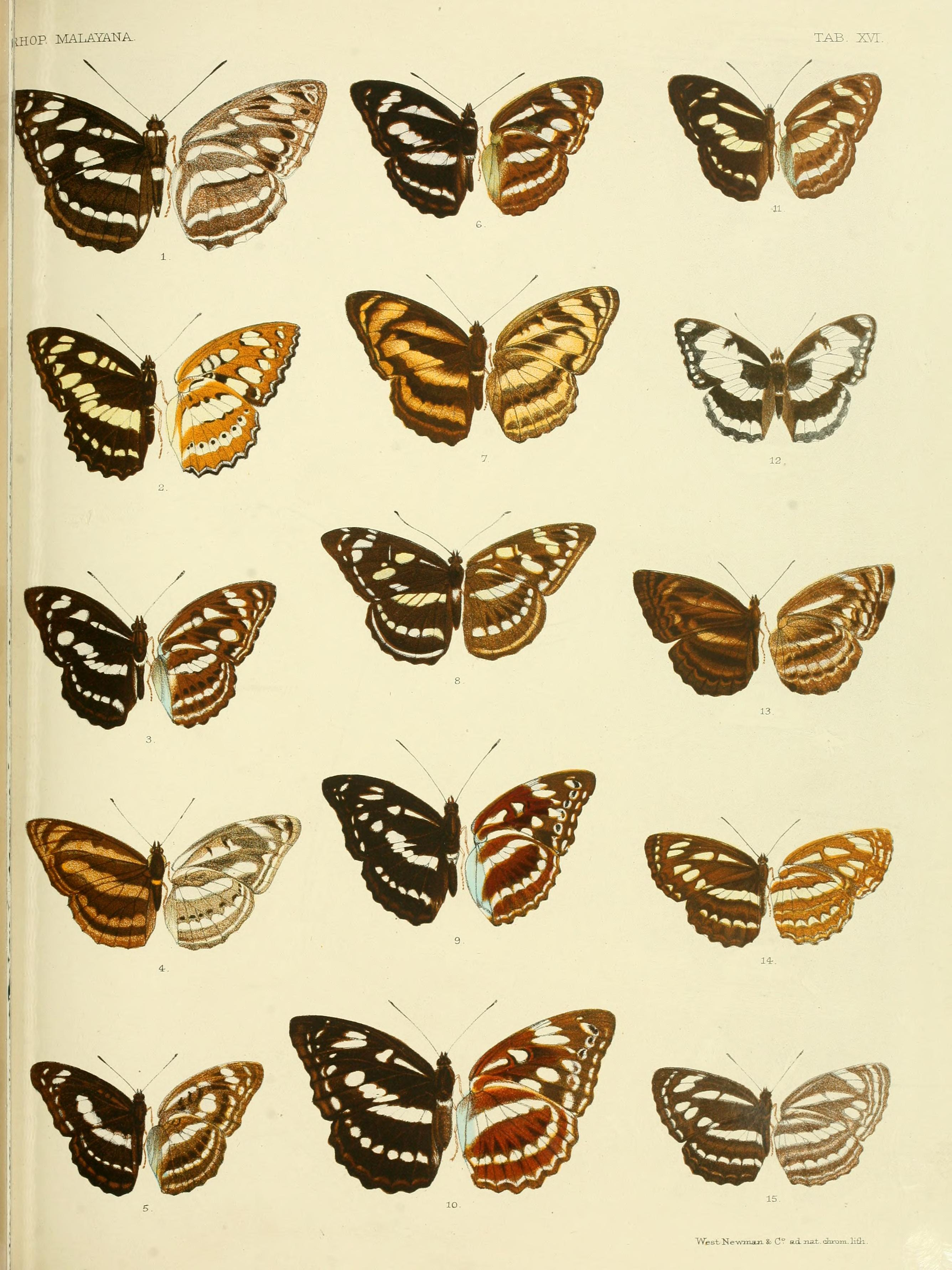
- Figure 1 in Rhopalocera Malayana

Scientific classification
- Kingdom: Animalia
- Phylum: Arthropoda
- Class: Insecta
- Order: Lepidoptera
- Family: Nymphalidae
- Genus: Athyma
- Species: A. larymna

Binomial name
- Athyma larymna (Doubleday, 1848)

= Athyma larymna =

Great sergeant

Species of butterfly

Athyma larymna, the great sergeant, is a species of nymphalid butterfly found in tropical and subtropical Asia.
