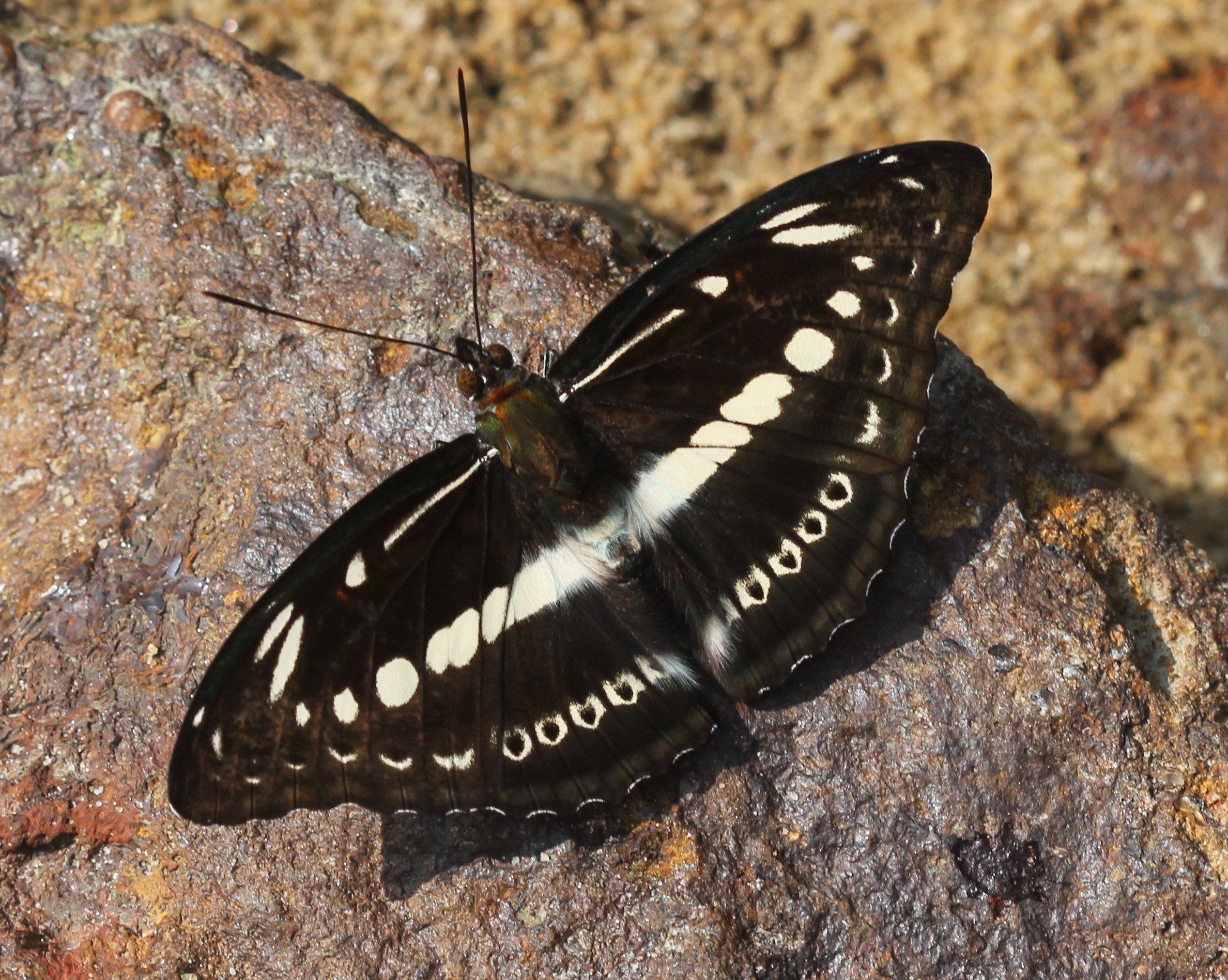
- A. a. asura, North East India.
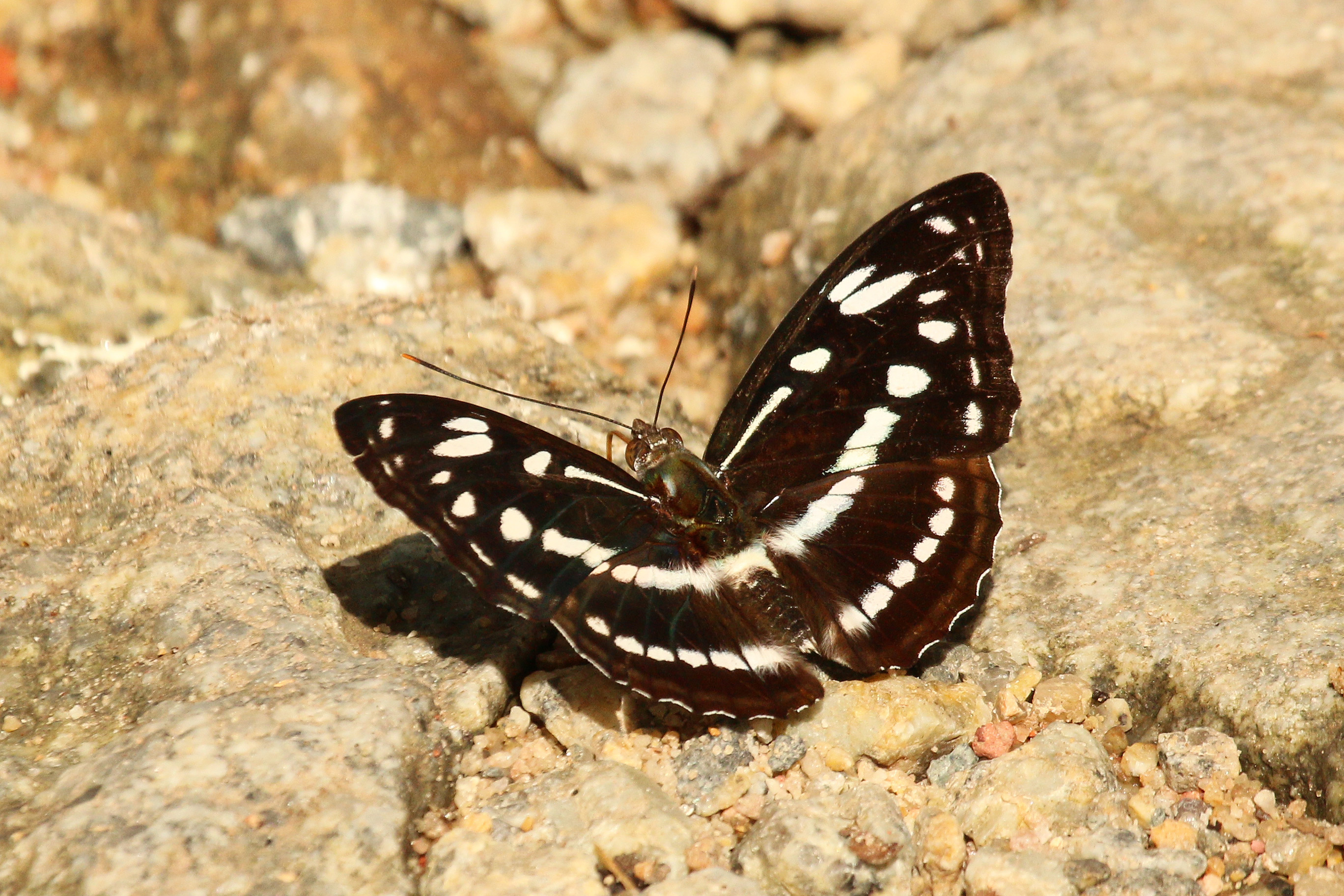
- A. a. idita, Singapore.

Scientific classification
- Kingdom: Animalia
- Phylum: Arthropoda
- Class: Insecta
- Order: Lepidoptera
- Family: Nymphalidae
- Genus: Athyma
- Species: A. asura

Binomial name
- Athyma asura Moore, 1858

= Athyma asura =

Studded sergeant

Species of butterfly

Athyma asura, also known as the studded sergeant or the Himalayan studded sergeant, is a species of large, tailess nymphalid butterfly found in tropical and in subtropical regions of Asia. It lives on rocks and stream habitats. The species primary coloration is black, white and brown. This species is protected in India under Schedule II of the Wildlife (Protection) act of 1972. A. asura has two subspecies, Athyma asura asura and Athyma asura idita.
