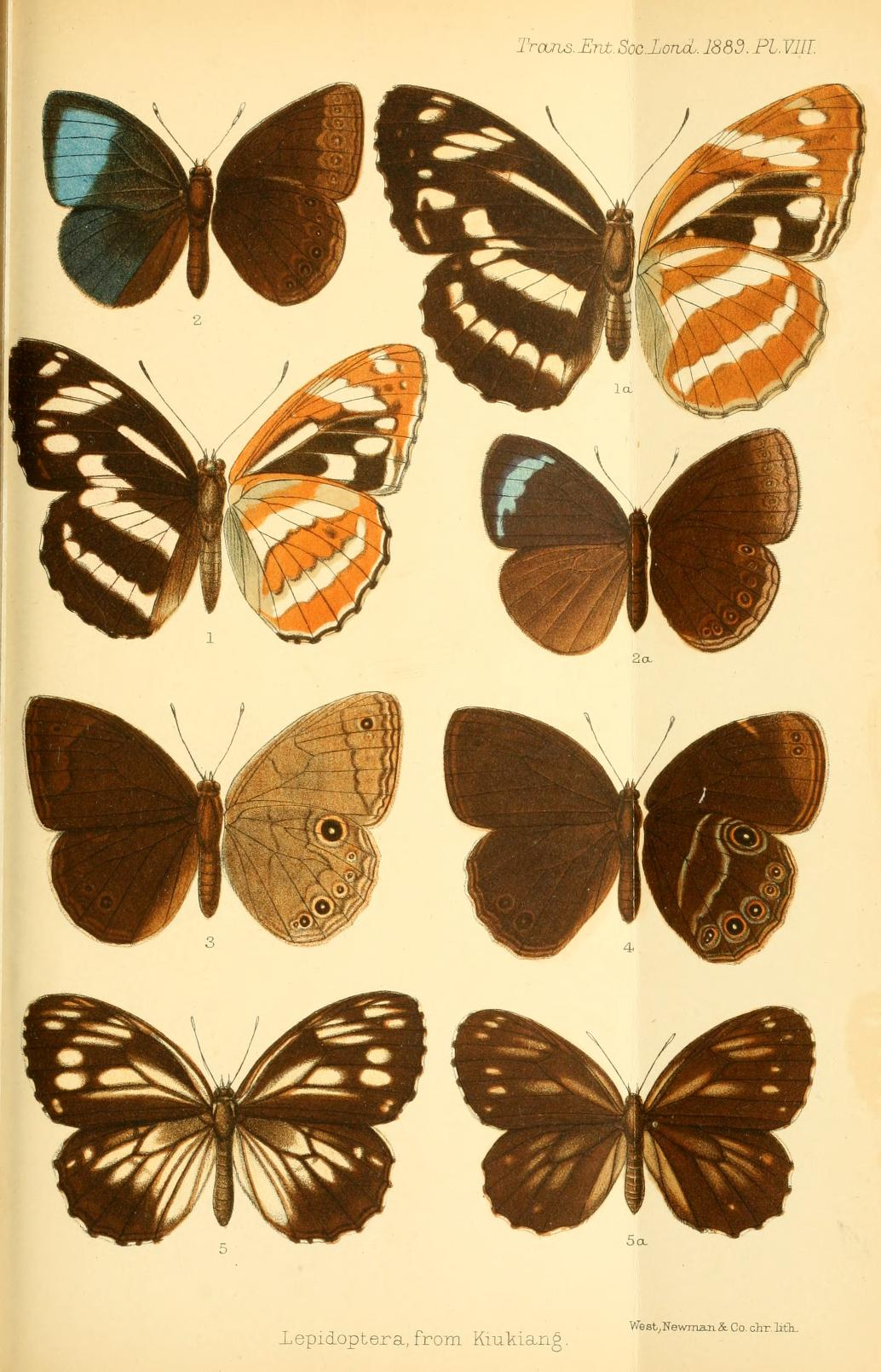
- Athyma fortuna 1 male. 1a female

Scientific classification
- Domain: Eukaryota
- Kingdom: Animalia
- Phylum: Arthropoda
- Class: Insecta
- Order: Lepidoptera
- Family: Nymphalidae
- Genus: Athyma
- Species: A. fortuna

Binomial name
- Athyma fortuna Leech, 1889

Synonyms
- Pantoporia fortuna kodahirai Sonan, 1938

= Athyma fortuna =

Species of butterfly

Athyma fortuna is a butterfly of the family Nymphalidae. It is found in the East Palearctic.

== Subspecies ==
- A. f. diffusa Leech (Central China)
- A. f. kodahirai (Sonan, 1938) (China：Taiwan)
- A. f. guangxiensis Wang, 1994 (China: Guangxi)
