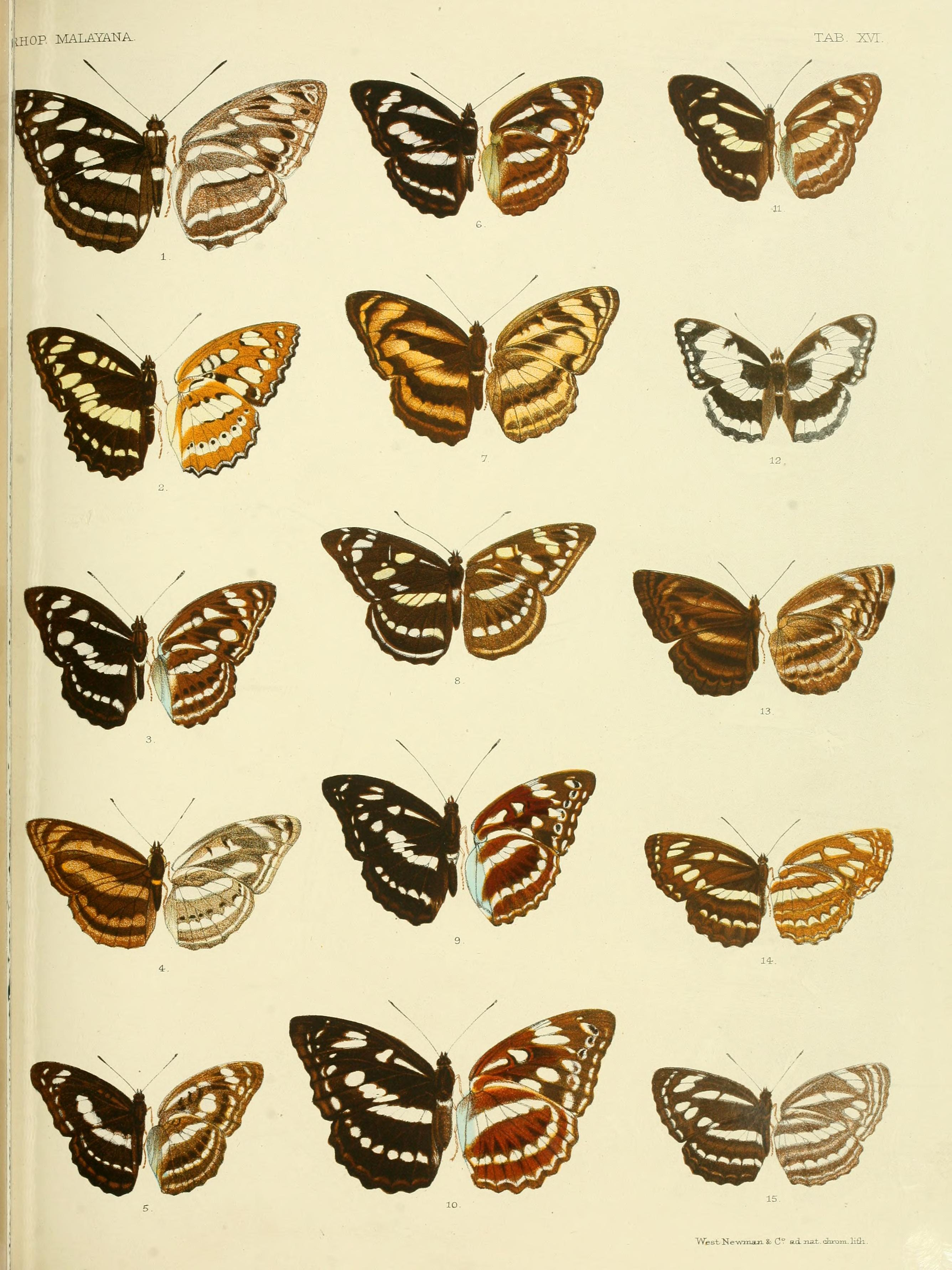
- Figure 3 in Rhopalocera Malayana

Scientific classification
- Kingdom: Animalia
- Phylum: Arthropoda
- Class: Insecta
- Order: Lepidoptera
- Family: Nymphalidae
- Genus: Athyma
- Species: A. reta

Binomial name
- Athyma reta Moore, 1858

= Athyma reta =

Malay staff sergeant

Species of butterfly

Athyma reta, the Malay staff sergeant, is a nymphalid butterfly found in tropical and subtropical Asia. The species was first described by Frederic Moore in 1858.
