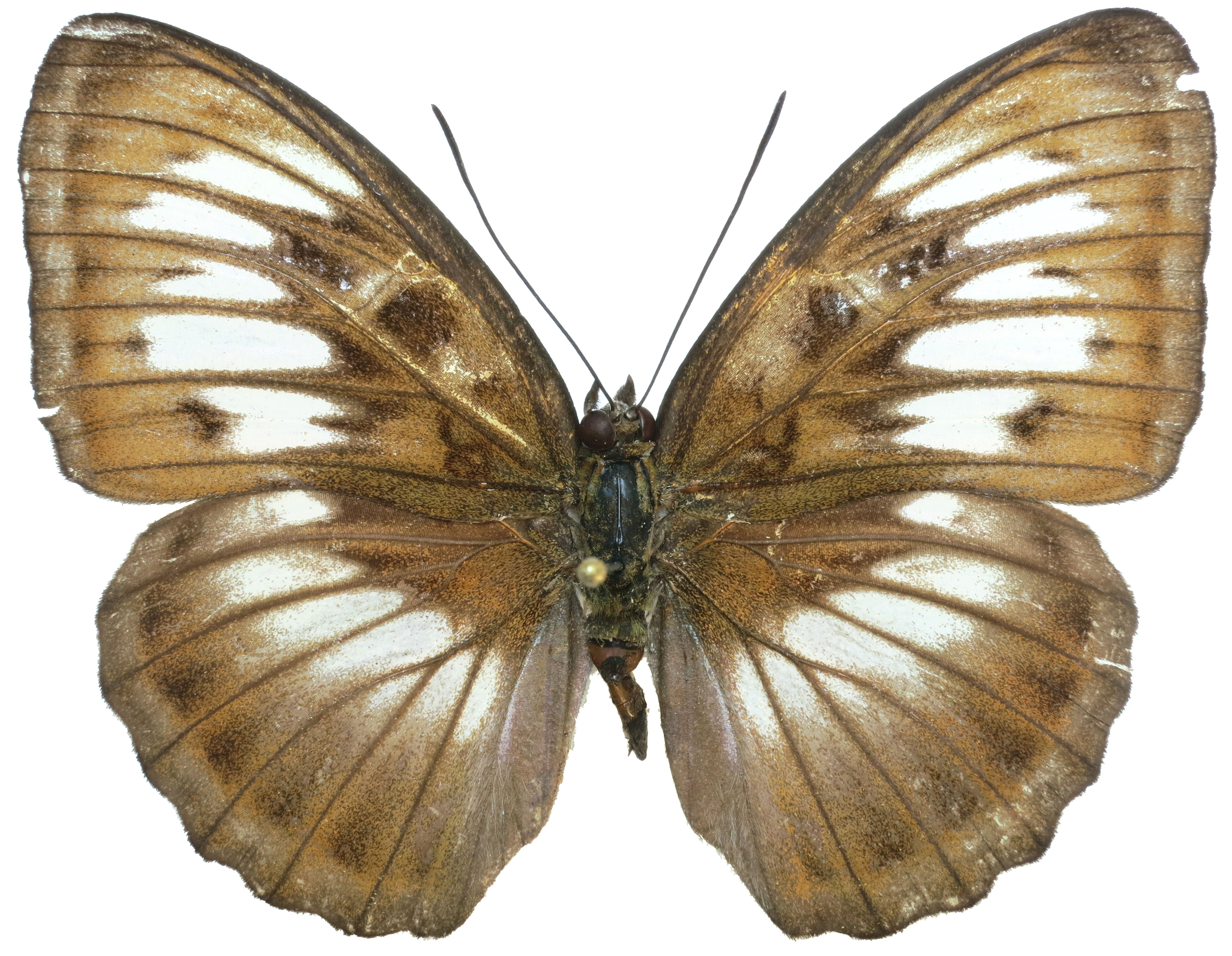
- male - Roxas, Palawan

Scientific classification
- Domain: Eukaryota
- Kingdom: Animalia
- Phylum: Arthropoda
- Class: Insecta
- Order: Lepidoptera
- Family: Nymphalidae
- Genus: Athyma
- Species: A. speciosa

Binomial name
- Athyma speciosa Staudinger, 1889

Synonyms
- Pantoporia preciosa Fruhstorfer, 1913

= Athyma speciosa =

Species of butterfly

Athyma speciosa is a Limenitidinae butterfly endemic to the Philippines. It is found in Palawan and Balabac.
