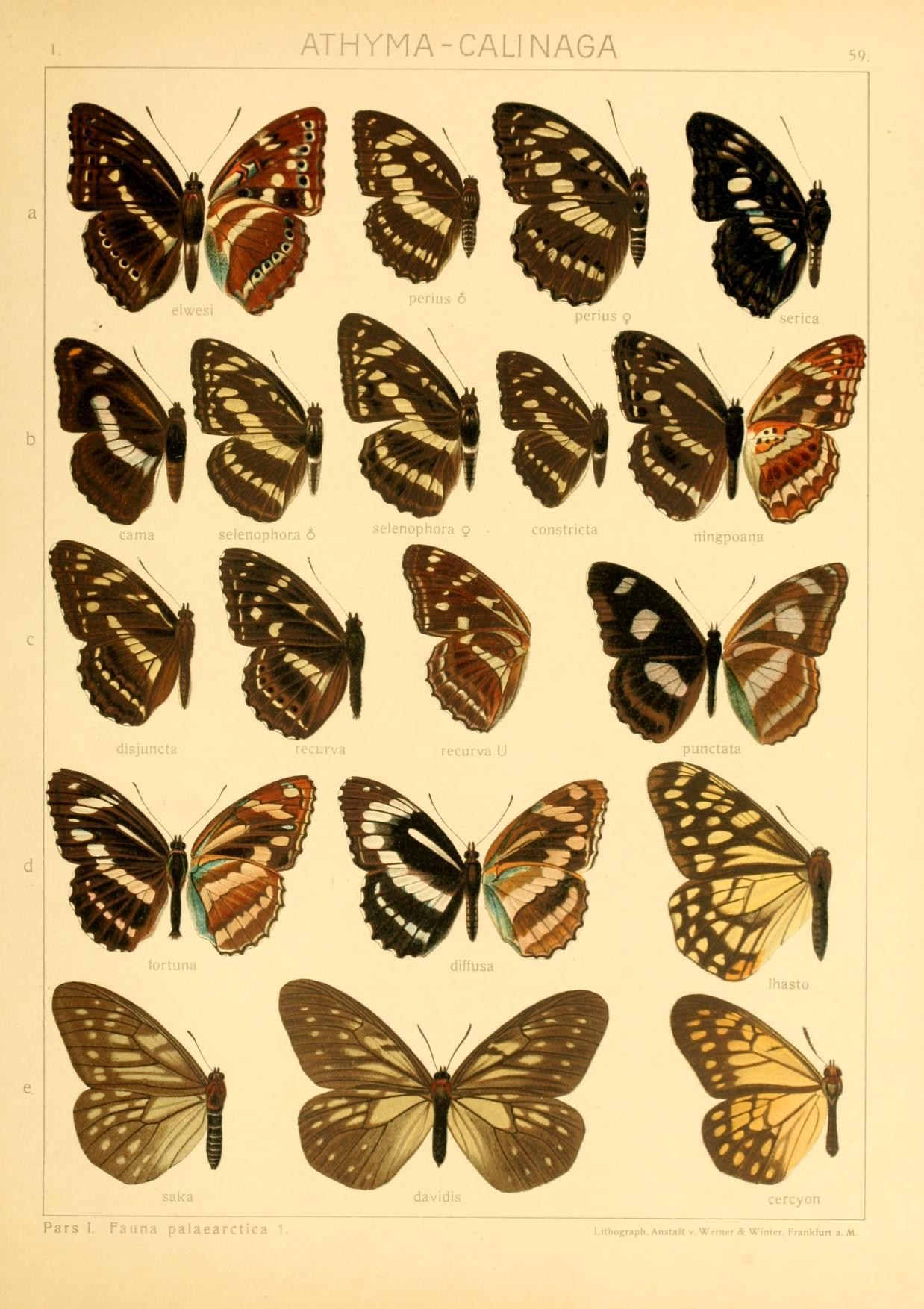
- Athyma disjuncta in Seitz (59c)

Scientific classification
- Domain: Eukaryota
- Kingdom: Animalia
- Phylum: Arthropoda
- Class: Insecta
- Order: Lepidoptera
- Family: Nymphalidae
- Genus: Athyma
- Species: A. disjuncta

Binomial name
- Athyma disjuncta Leech, 1890

= Athyma disjuncta =

Species of butterfly

Athyma disjuncta is a butterfly found in the Palearctic that belongs to the browns family. It is endemic to China (West China and Central China)

== Description from Seitz ==
P. disjuncta Leech (59c). On the upperside similar to the preceding species [P. sulpitia Cr.], the forewing apparently somewhat more elongate, the cell-spots of the forewing rather different, especially on the underside. The hindwing below with a white streak before the costal vein, the basal spots less prominent, the discal band more erect, i. e. being posteriorly nearer the anal angle, and composed of broader ovate spots. Also the present species bears a certain resemblance to L. helmanni. — Not rare in Central China (Chang- Yang), also in West China: Omei-shan, Moupin, etc.
