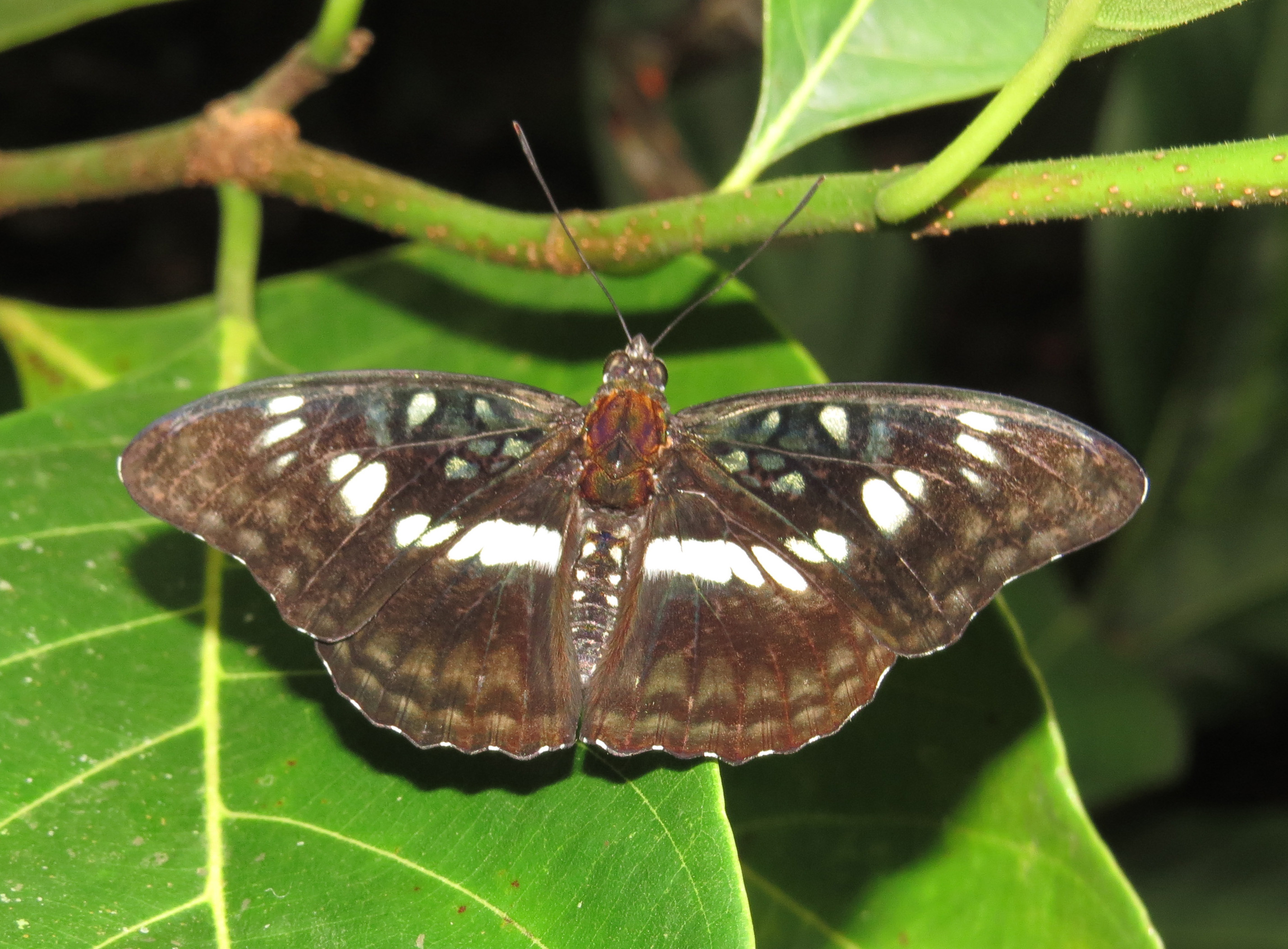

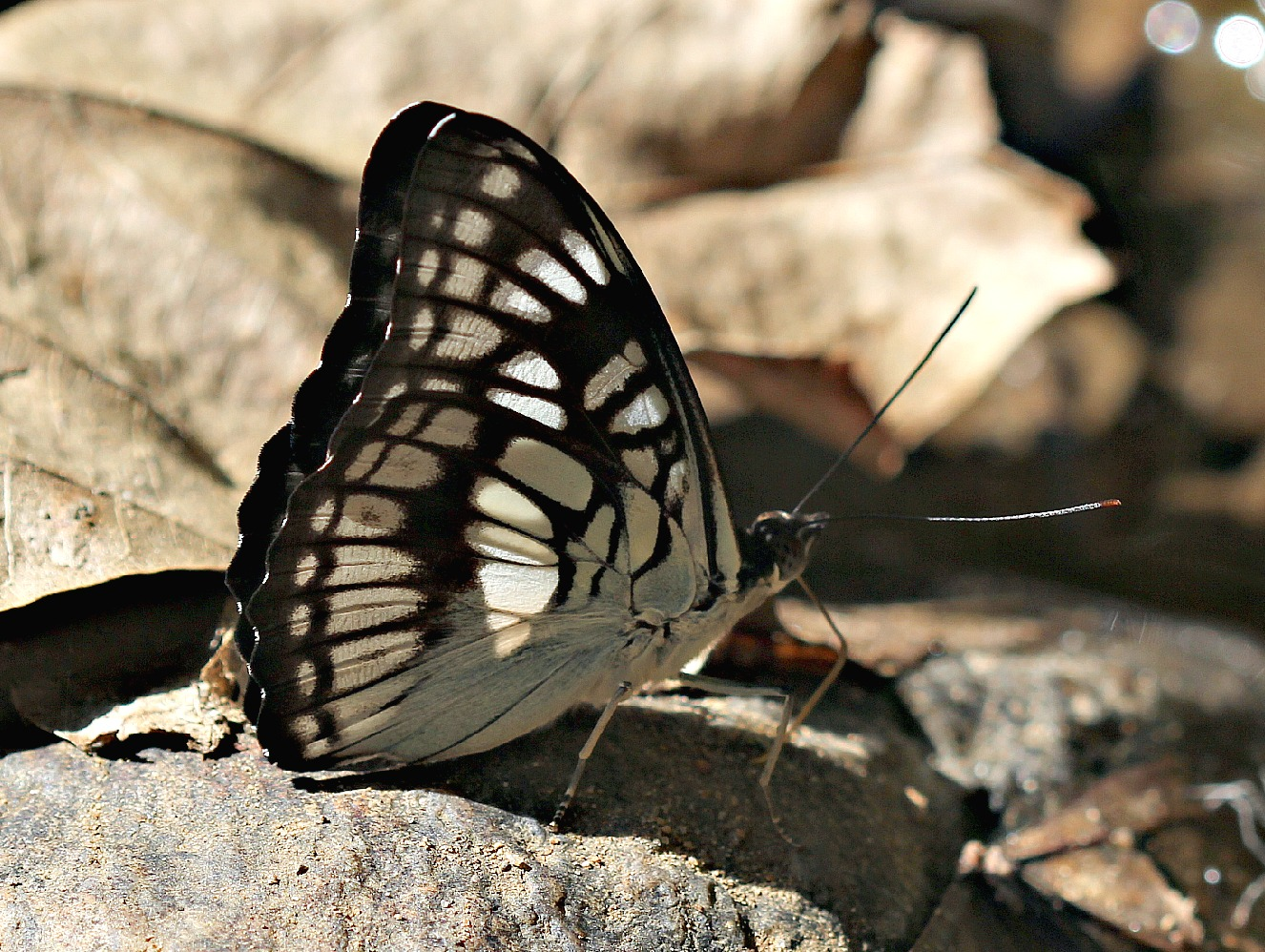

Scientific classification
- Domain: Eukaryota
- Kingdom: Animalia
- Phylum: Arthropoda
- Class: Insecta
- Order: Lepidoptera
- Family: Nymphalidae
- Genus: Athyma
- Species: A. ranga

Binomial name
- Athyma ranga Moore, 1857

Synonyms
- Athyma mahesa; Pantoporia ranga

= Athyma ranga =

Blackvein sergeant

Species of butterfly

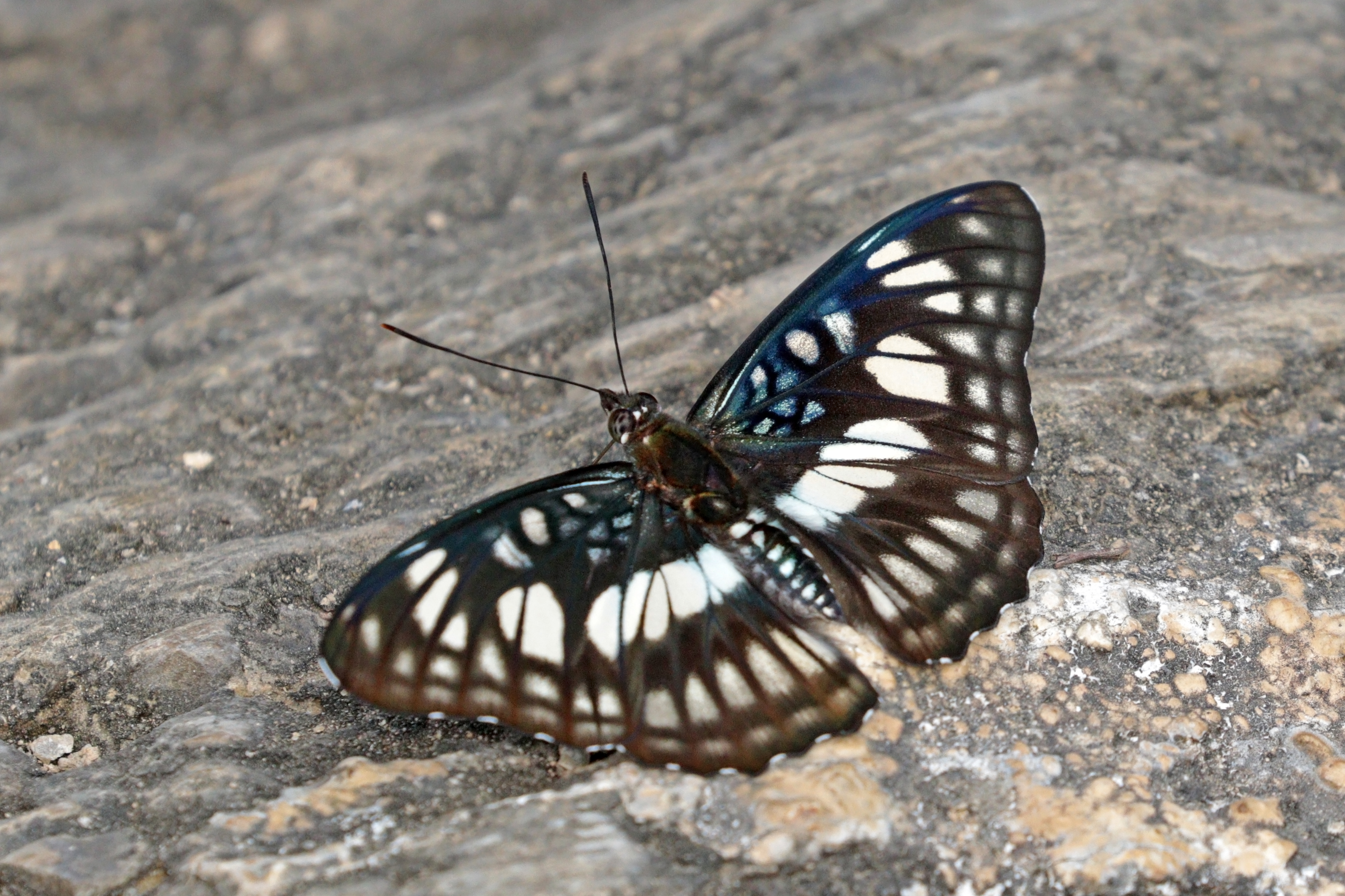
A.r. ranga female, Pokhara, Nepal

Athyma ranga, the blackvein sergeant, is a species of nymphalid butterfly found in south-west India, Cambodia and parts of Southeast Asia.

== Description ==
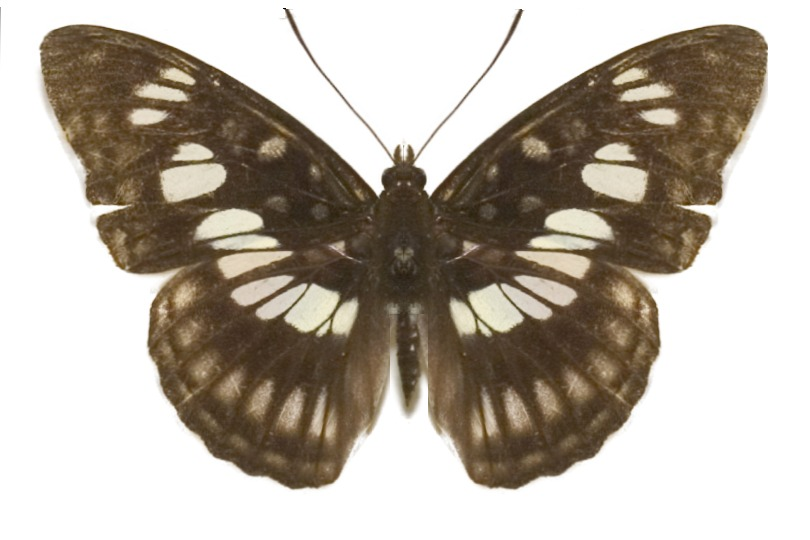
Image based on museum specimen of Athyma ranga

Upperside: Male velvety black, female very dark brown, suffused with bluish in certain lights.

Forewing: A medial anterior and a preapical larger whitish spot in cell; posteriorly in the cell, beyond its apex and below it at base of interspace 1, some dull obscure blue spots; a discal series of white spots, three elongate placed obliquely from just beyond middle of costa, two more inwards in interspaces 2 and 3, one in middle of interspaces 1 a and 1; the spot in interspace 2 very large truncate exteriorly, the spot in interspace 3 elongate. Beyond these spots an inner and an outer subterminal line of transverse white marks irrorated more or less with blackish scales.

Hindwing: a subbasal broad transverse macular white band, the anterior spots that compose it more widely separated than the others, a postdiscal series of white spots, irrorated with black scales, and a subterminal line of short detached narrow transverse pale marks in the interspaces; cilia on forewings and hindwings black alternated with white.

Underside very dark brown, shaded and blotched with black between the white markings; these latter as on the upperside, but all pure white, much larger, much more clearly defined; dorsal margin of hindwing broadly pale blue.

Antennae, head, thorax and abdomen black; the thorax anteriorly obscurely glossed with blue; the abdomen with a series of lateral white spots on each side from base; body beneath white, glossed on thorax with pale blue; eyes hairy.

The dry-season form has the ground colour above dark brown in both sexes and the markings broader and sullied white; on the underside the ground colour is distinctly ochraceous brown.

== Distribution ==
Sikkim; Bhutan; hills of Assam, Burma and Tenasserim. Found also in southern India, Western Ghats and the Nilgiris.

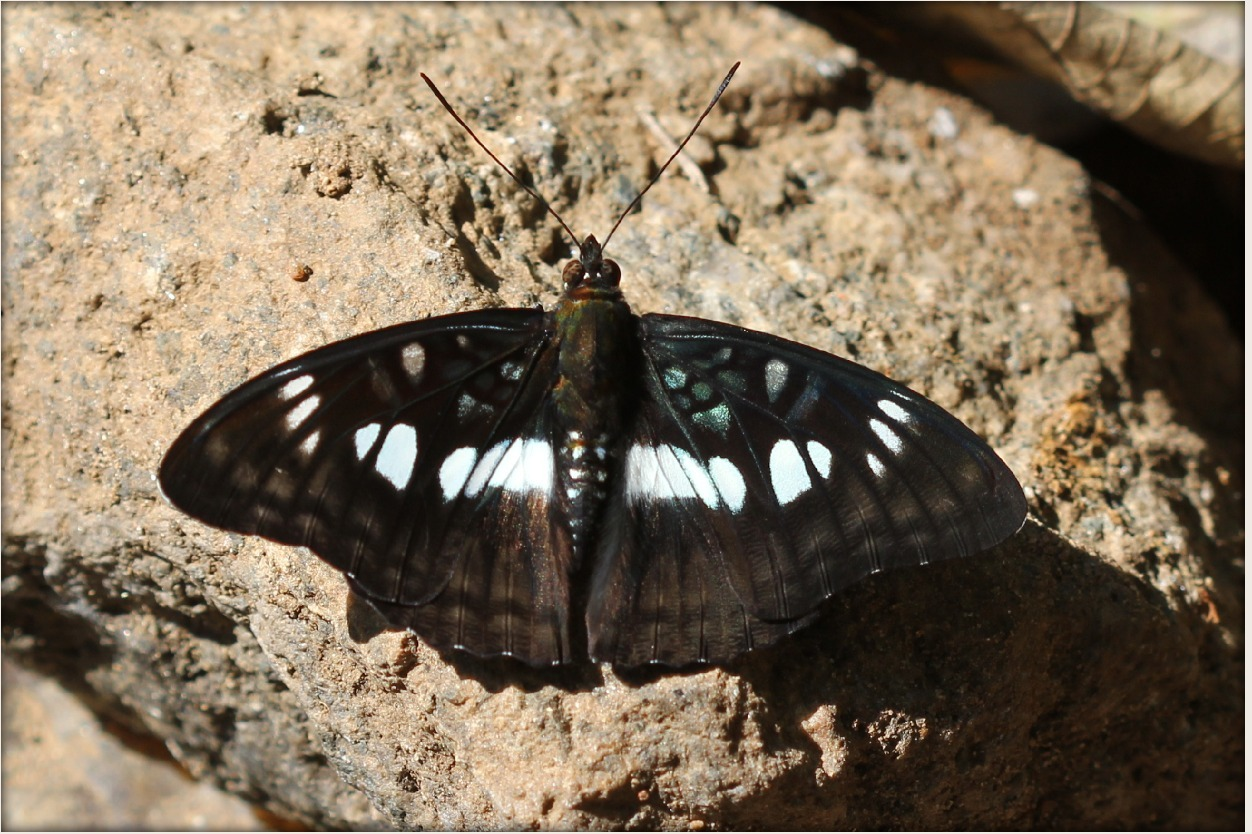
Blackvein sergeant puddling at Silent Valley National Park

== Life history ==
=== Larva ===
"In form the larva was exactly similar to that of Limenitis (Moduza) procris. ...; in colour it was green, with a whitish band round the 9th segment. Its habits were also like those of L. procris, but not quite the same. It selected one of the side nerves of a leaf and ate away the soft parts on each side till the bare nerve stood out; then having barricaded the approach to this with fragments of leaf which it had contrived to cut off in feeding, mixed with excrement and silk, it rested motionless on the very point of the rib unapproachable by ants or spiders. After the last moult it gave up these habits and rested on the upperside of a leaf, where it was conspicuous enough. We infer that the worst enemies of this species- are not birds or parasites but small spiders and predaceous insects." (Davidson & Aitken)

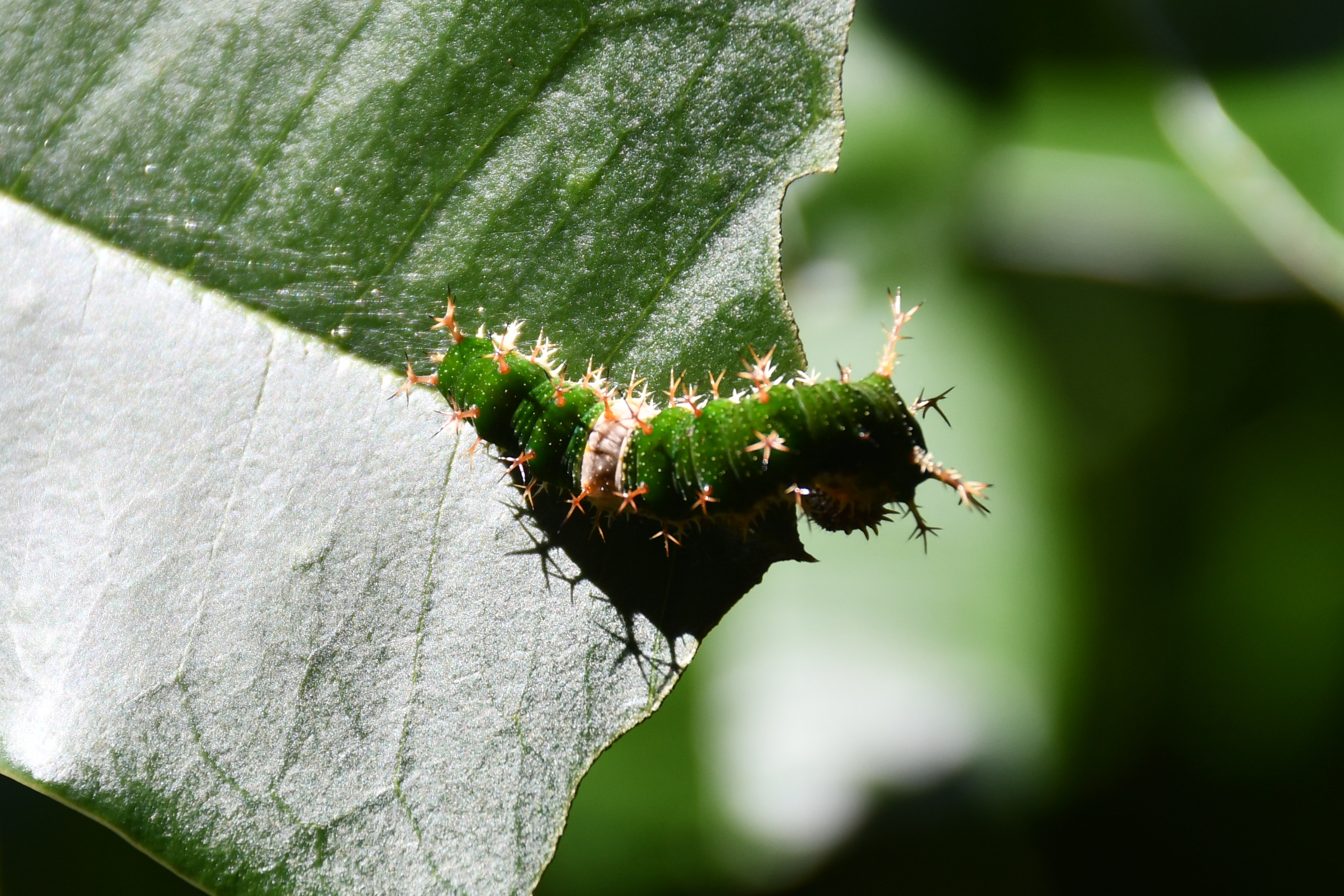
Blackvein sergeant larva feeding on leaves of Chionanthus mala-elengi

=== Pupa ===
Of the most brilliant silver colour, the segments and parts being outlined in brown. It is suspended perpendicularly; abdominal segments slender, the thoracic region larger and expanded laterally; two long sharp horns issuing from the sides of the head and at first parallel, diverge and point laterally; on the back there are two prominent processes curved towards each other, and many small points and tubercles. (Davidson & Aitken)

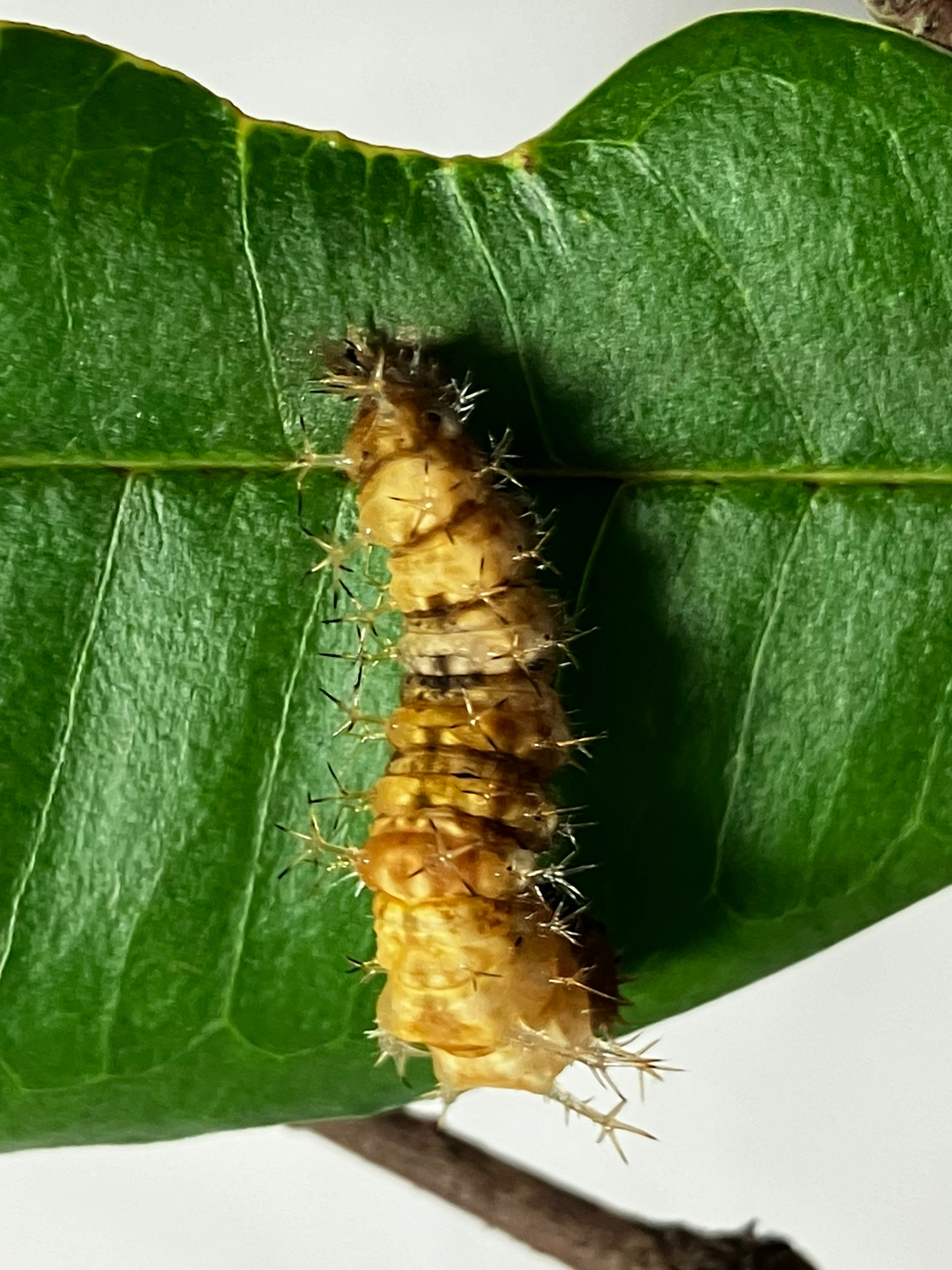
Blackvein sergeant larva in pre-pupal stage

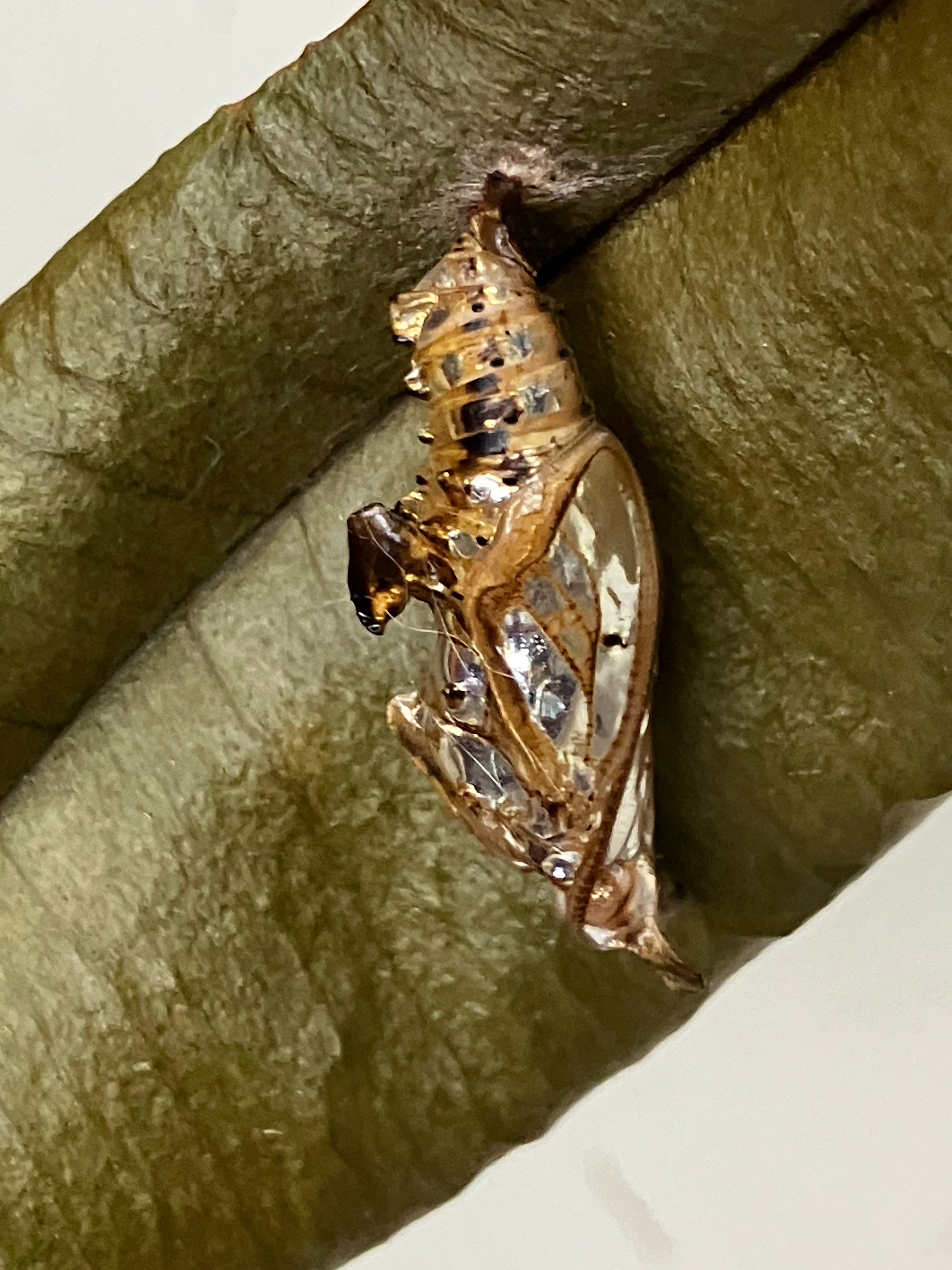
Blackvein sergeant pupa

=== Food plants ===
- Olea dioica
- Chionanthus mala-elengi
- Ligustrum lucidum
- Ligustrum sinense
