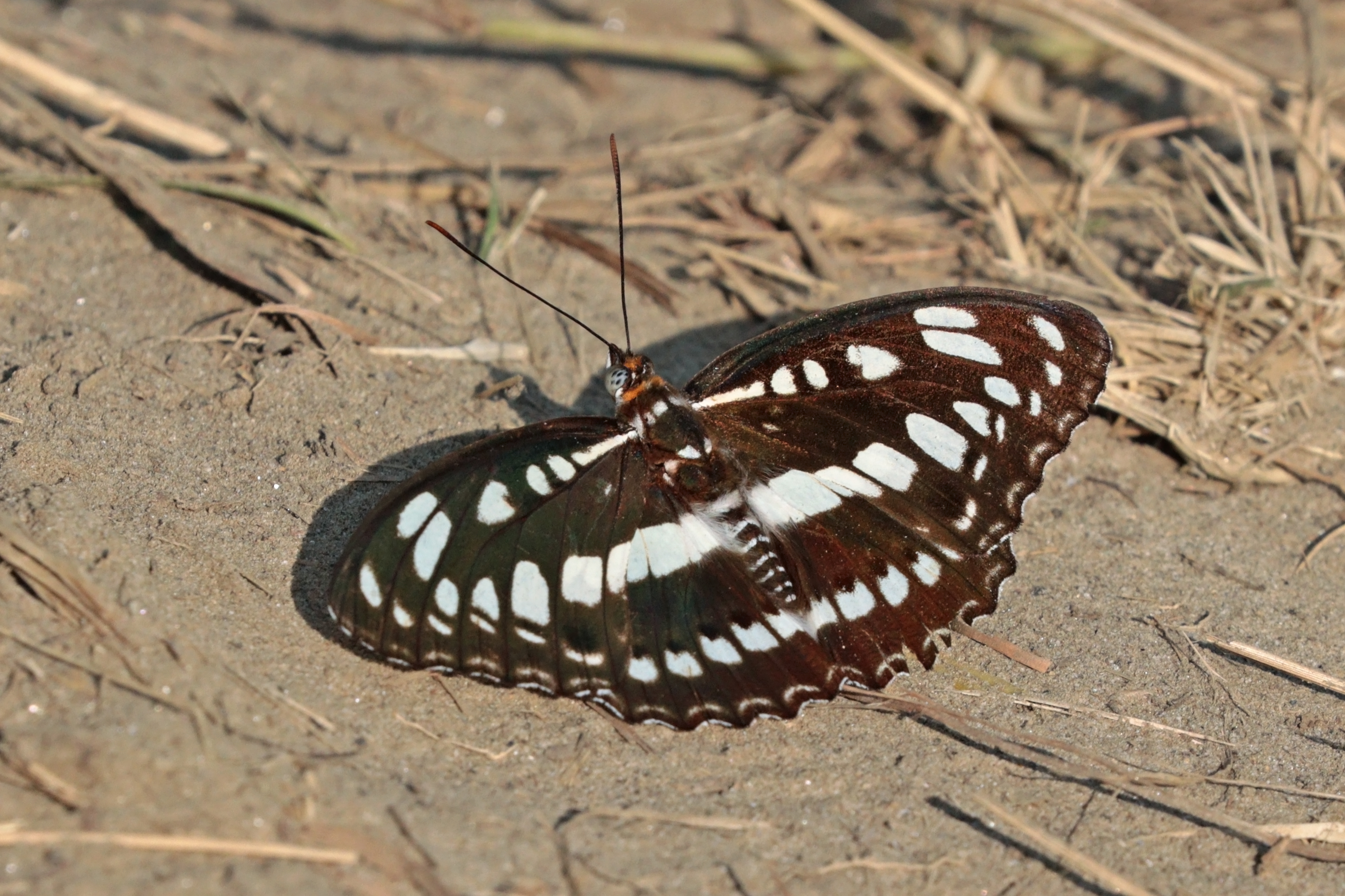
- A. p. perius, Nepal
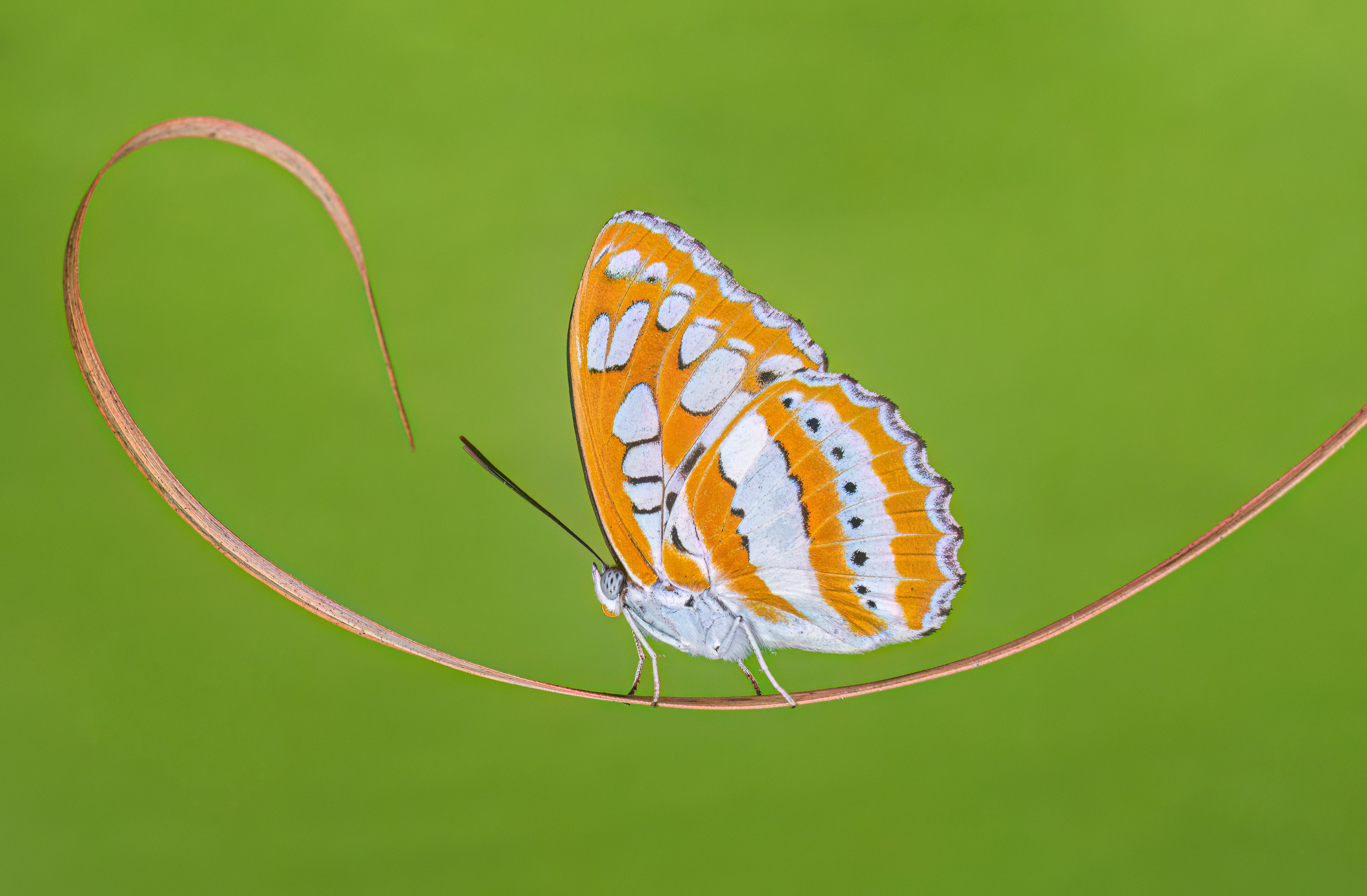
- Ventral view

Scientific classification
- Kingdom: Animalia
- Phylum: Arthropoda
- Class: Insecta
- Order: Lepidoptera
- Family: Nymphalidae
- Genus: Athyma
- Species: A. perius

Binomial name
- Athyma perius (Linnaeus, 1758)

Subspecies
- Four, see text

= Athyma perius =

Common sergeant

Species of butterfly

Athyma perius, the common sergeant, is a species of nymphalid butterfly found in South Asia and Southeast Asia.

== Description ==
The Athyma perius male has black wings with a series of white markings, while the female is a blackish brown. The underside of the wings are ochre yellow with the white markings as on the upperside but heavily margined and defined with black. The antennae are black and there is a spot of ochre between the eyes. The thorax has a band or two of bluish spots anteriorly and posteriorly. The abdomen is transversely and narrowly barred with bluish white; beneath, the palpi, thorax and abdomen pure white. In the female, the abdomen has a double lateral row of minute black dots.

Male and female. Upperside dark fuliginous-black; markings white; cilia alternated with white. Forewing with a white basal streak and two spots within the cell; a subtriangular larger spot at end of the cell; a transverse discal excurved series of seven spots, the two upper elongated and narrow, the others increasingly oblong, the third and fourth smallest; followed by a submarginal undulated row of six very small more or less lunate spots, the upper five being disposed obliquely outward, and the lower inward, the upper spot sometimes, and the lower always, duplex; beyond is a marginal row of very indistinctly-defiued slender sullied-whitish lunules. Hindwing crossed by a broad white inner-discal band and a narrower submarginal macular band, the latter being inwardly bordered by a row of small distinct black spots; a marginal row of very slender sullied-white lunules. All these markings are larger and broadest in the dry-season brood.

Underside bright yellowish-ochreous; markings as above, but all purer white, more or less margined with black; marginal lunules distinctly violescent-white and externally black-edged. Forewing also with the posterior border interspaced with diffused pale purpurescent-black patches, and a black ringlet-mark below the cell. Hindiving also with a subbasal white band edged with black along the precostal vein, this band also extending hind ward along the abdominal margin; the discal band moi'e or less margined on each side with black, the submarginal band entire, with the black spots disposed within its inner edge.

Body and palpi above black; thorax with two white bands and abdomen with white segmental bands; collar and vertex ochreous; palpi beneath and legs greyish-white; antennae black, its basal joint white beneath.

— Frederic Moore, Lepidoptera Indica. Vol. III

== Subspecies ==
Listed alphabetically:

- Athyma perius avitus (Fruhstorfer, 1915)
- Athyma perius hierasus (Fruhstorfer, 1915)
- Athyma perius perinus Fruhstorfer, 1903
- Athyma perius perius (Linnaeus, 1758)

== Distribution ==
Athyma perius is found throughout the Himalayas, India, Burma, Tenasserim, to Siam and the Malay Peninsula.

== Life history ==
Athyma perius uses Glochidion lanceolatum, G. velutinum and Wendlandia thyrsoidea as food plants.
