= Athyma rufula =

Andaman sergeant

Scientific classification
- Kingdom: Animalia
- Phylum: Arthropoda
- Class: Insecta
- Order: Lepidoptera
- Family: Nymphalidae
- Genus: Athyma
- Species: A. rufula

Binomial name
- Athyma rufula de Niceville, [1889]

Species of butterfly

Athyma rufula, the Andaman sergeant, is a species of nymphalid butterfly found in tropical and subtropical Asia.
