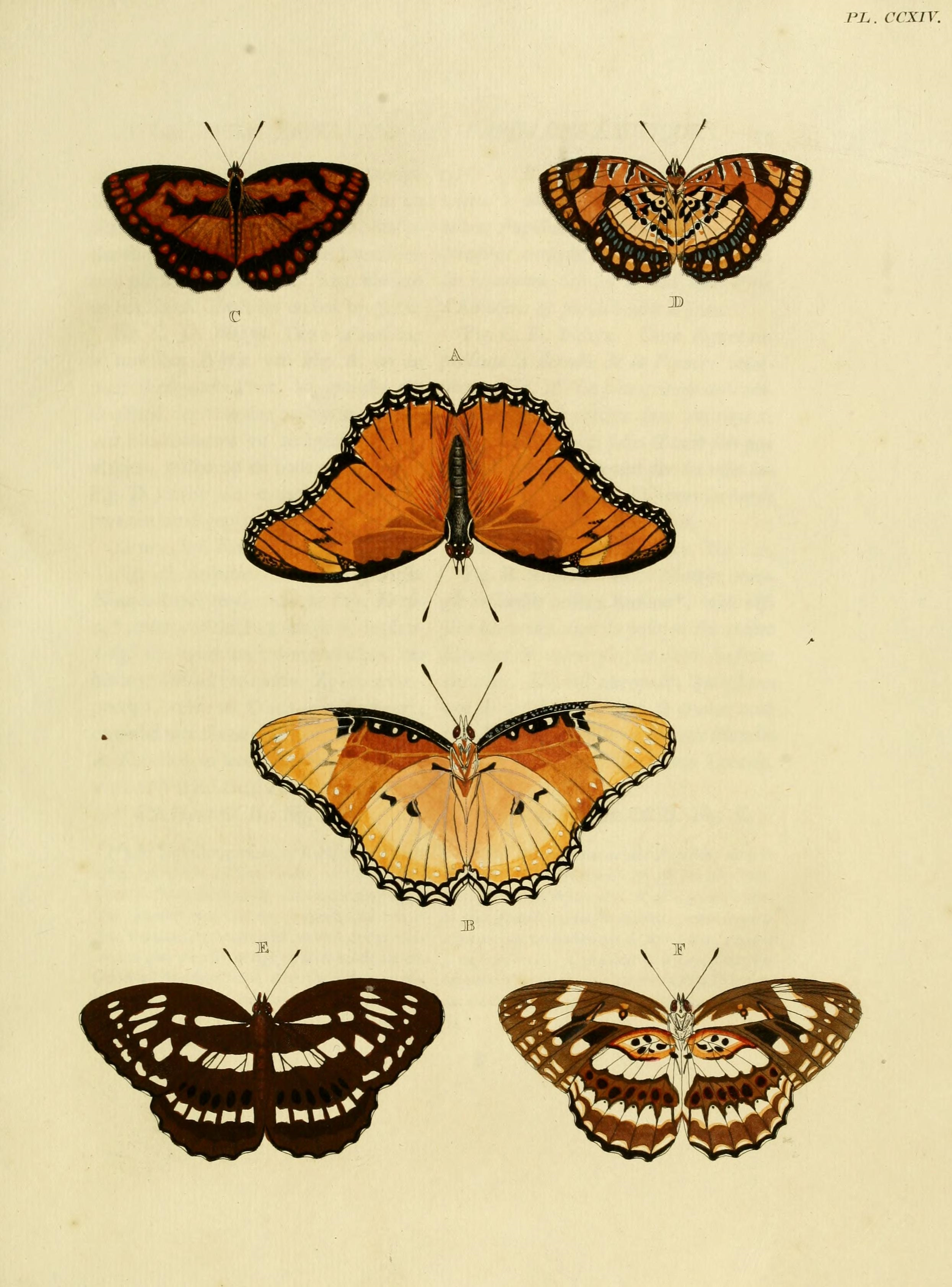
- Figures E and F. The plate is from Pieter Cramer and Caspar Stoll's Uitlandsche Kapellen and accompanied the original description.

Scientific classification
- Kingdom: Animalia
- Phylum: Arthropoda
- Clade: Pancrustacea
- Class: Insecta
- Order: Lepidoptera
- Family: Nymphalidae
- Genus: Athyma
- Species: A. sulpitia

Binomial name
- Athyma sulpitia (Cramer, 1779)

= Athyma sulpitia =

Spotted sergeant

Species of butterfly

Athyma sulpitia, the spotted sergeant, is a species of nymphalid butterfly found in tropical and subtropical Asia.
