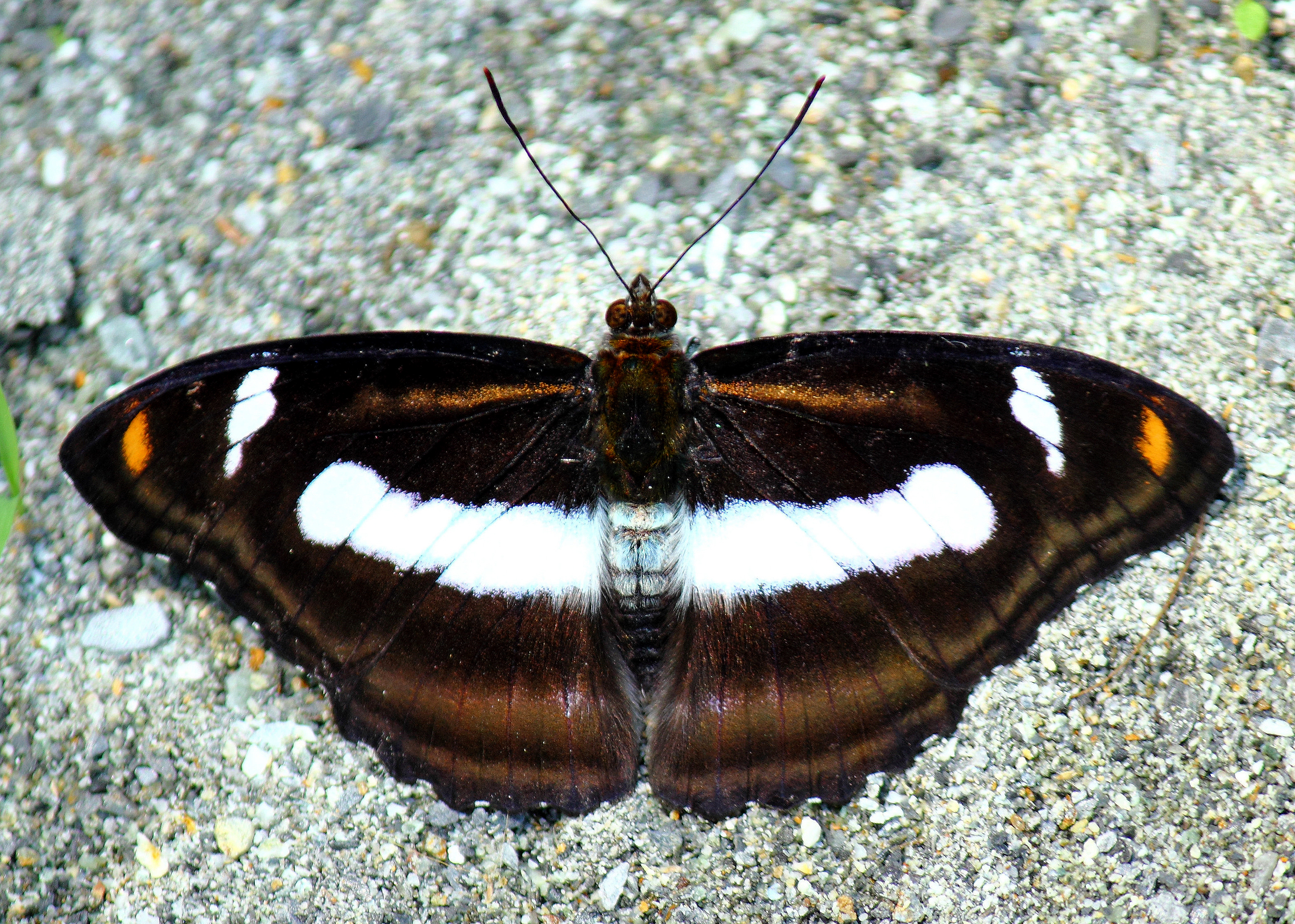
- Dorsal View

Scientific classification
- Kingdom: Animalia
- Phylum: Arthropoda
- Class: Insecta
- Order: Lepidoptera
- Family: Nymphalidae
- Genus: Athyma
- Species: A. cama

Binomial name
- Athyma cama Moore, 1858

= Athyma cama =

Orange staff sergeant

Species of butterfly

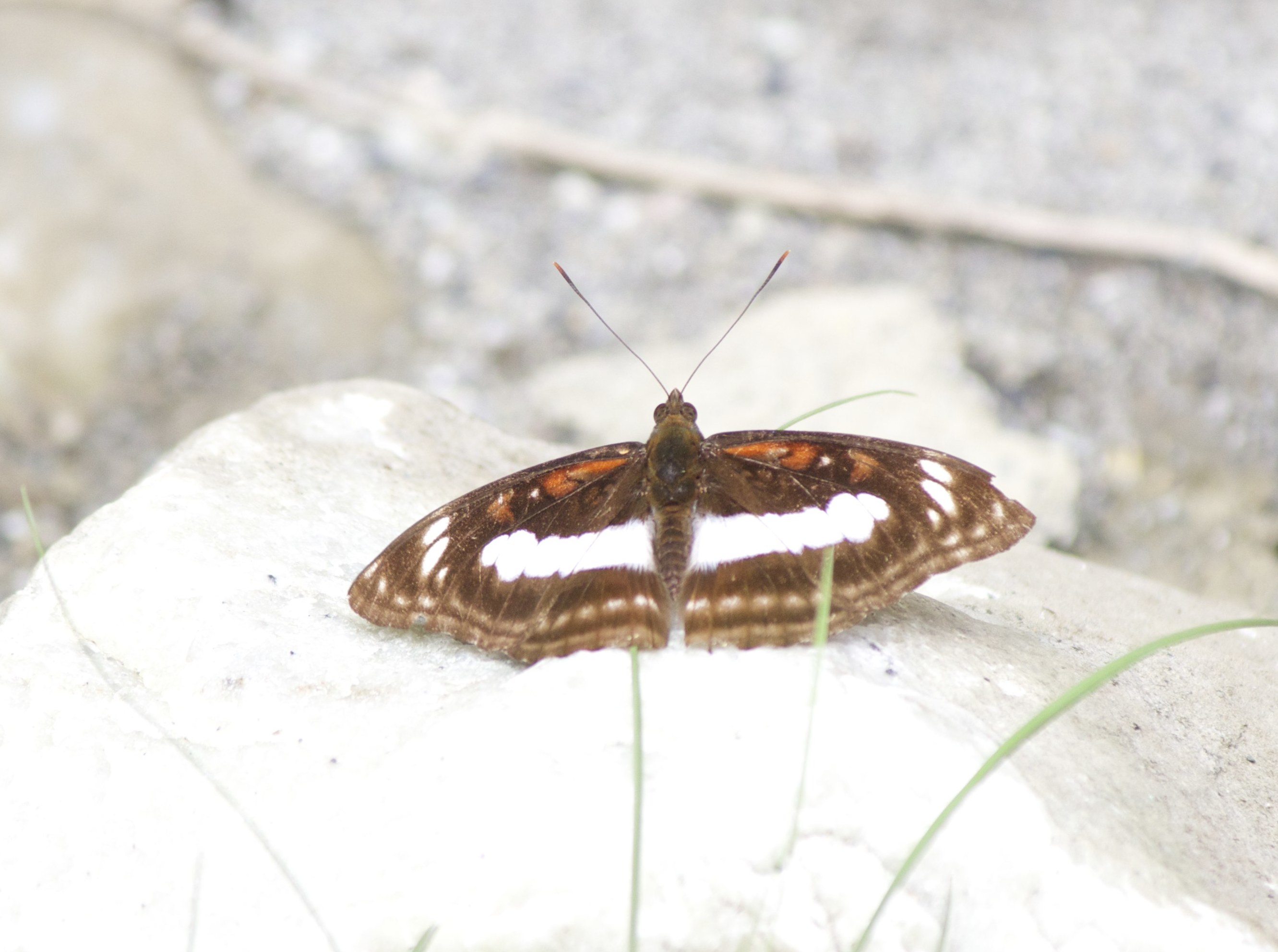
In Buxa Tiger Reserve, West Bengal, India

Athyma cama, the orange staff sergeant, is a species of nymphalid butterfly found in tropical and subtropical Asia.

== Subspecies ==
The subspecies of Athyma cama found in India are-

- Athyma cama cama Moore, 1857 – Himalayan Orange Staff Sergeant
