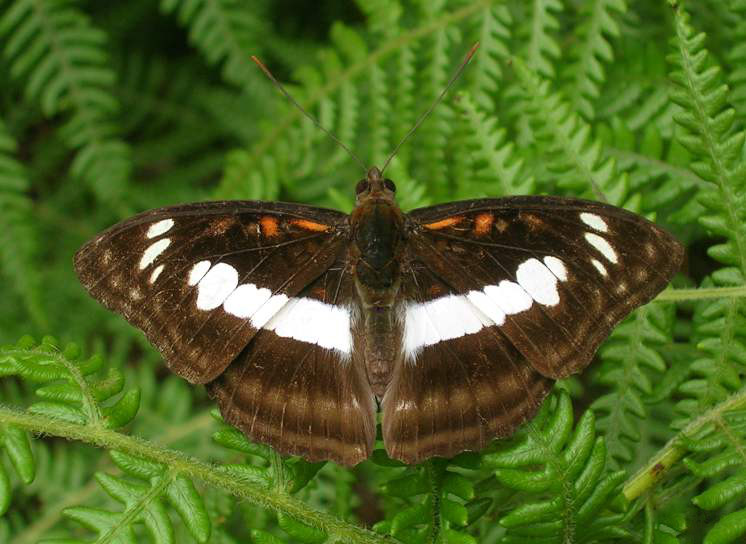
- At Tadiandamol in Karnataka, India

Scientific classification
- Domain: Eukaryota
- Kingdom: Animalia
- Phylum: Arthropoda
- Class: Insecta
- Order: Lepidoptera
- Family: Nymphalidae
- Genus: Athyma
- Species: A. selenophora

Binomial name
- Athyma selenophora (Kollar, 1844)

Synonyms
- Pantoporia selenophora

= Athyma selenophora =

Staff sergeant

Species of insect (butterfly)

Athyma selenophora, the staff sergeant, is a species of nymphalid butterfly found in tropical and subtropical Asia.

== Description ==
The male upperside is black with a forewing that has a discoidal streak deep red, twice divided, with the apical portion dusky white. Three elongate oval white spots appear in the interspaces beyond, forming a distinct white band, variable in width, from dorsum to interspace 3.

The staff sergeant features an obscure inner subterminal line of transverse whitish marks, and another outer subterminal pale line that's even more obscure. The hindwing has a broad white discal band of the forewing continued across to vein 1, a postdiscal narrow diffuse pale macular band, and a subterminal pale line; abdominal fold dusky grey; cilia of both forewings and hindwings black, alternated with white.

The underside is bright chestnut red with the markings as on the upperside but all white, on the terminal portions of the wings diffuse. Discoidal streak in forewing white, diffuse, more broadly divided; interspace 8 white at base, with a dark chestnut-red loop below it in interspace 7 crossing into the cellular area; very dark postdiscal blotches in interspaces 1a, 1 to 3 on forewing; and a series of very dark chestnut-red marks between discal and postdiscal bands on the hindwing; dorsal margin of hindwing broadly blue. Antennae, head, thorax and abdomen very dark brown; beneath, the palpi, thorax and abdomen white faintly tinged with blue.

Female upperside velvety brownish black with white and pale markings, Forewing: the discoidal streak clavate (club like), twice divided, a large elongate triangular spot beyond apex of cell; a macular discal band of four large spots inclined outwards from dorsum, and three obliquely placed spots from beyond the middle of the costa, the lowest spot of these minute, the next two large, elongate, with a very slender short streak above them on the costa; an inner subterminal series of transverse spots and an outer subterminal pale incomplete line. Hindwing; the subbasal broad band widening towards costa; a postdiscal series of large, inwardly bluntly conical spots and a broad subterminal pale line. Underside as in the male, but the white markings broader, the ground colour not so bright. Antennae, thorax and abdomen as in the male but the abdomen with a white transverse band at base.

Wingspan 66–72 mm

Habitat: the Himalayas; southern India, the Nilgiris, the Western Ghats; Assam, Myanmar and northern Tenasserim.

In the dry-season form the ground colour in both sexes is brown, paler in the male than in the female; the discal band variable in width, but on the whole broader both on the upper and under sides, and the ground colour on the underside ochraceous brown.

Larva and pupa: Like that of Athyma inara, Doubleday & Hewitson, but the dorsal patch is much smaller and there are some white spots on the sides. The pupa is distinguished from that of A. inara by slight differences in the shape of the grotesque processes on the head and thorax. The common food plant is the Adina cordifolia (Davidson, Bell and Aitken).

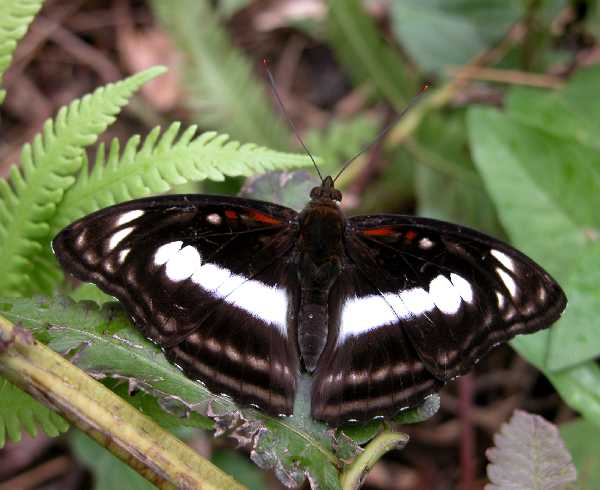
At Jairampur, Arunachal Pradesh, India

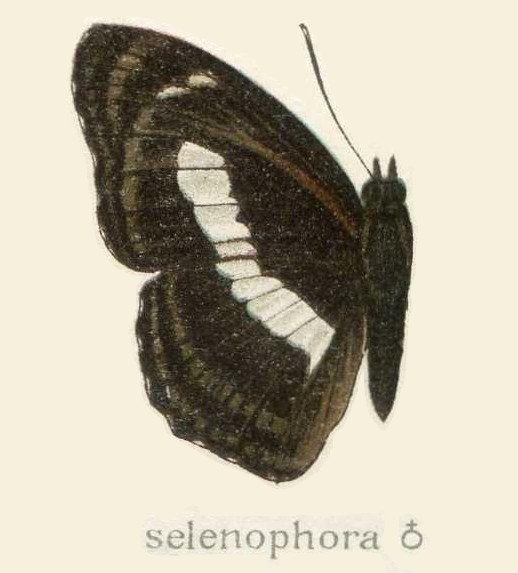
Male upperside, from Adalbert Seitz
