= Euthalia kanda =

- Euthalia kanda in Seitz as surgas Vollenhoven

Scientific classification
- Kingdom: Animalia
- Phylum: Arthropoda
- Clade: Pancrustacea
- Class: Insecta
- Order: Lepidoptera
- Family: Nymphalidae
- Genus: Euthalia
- Species: E. kanda

Binomial name
- Euthalia kanda (Moore, 1859)

Synonyms
- Adolias surjas Snellen van Vollenhoven, 1862

Species of butterfly

Euthalia kanda is a butterfly of the family Nymphalidae (Limenitidinae). It is found in the Indomalayan realm. A plain species above unicolorous dark umber-brown of a peculiar golden-green bronze lustre. On the forewing the cellular spots as in apicalis, both wings traversed by slightly undulate black lines closely approaching each other on the hind¬wing. Beneath it resembles a very pale merta but with much more delicate markings. An essential characteristic to distinguish the sexes by are the black crescent-shaped rings at the end of the cell in the forewing, which are narrower and more compressed than in any other Euthalia. Antennae quite red beneath, above as far as the middle brillant pale fulvous, differing from those of all other species.

== Subspecies ==
- E. k. kanda Borneo
- E. k. elicius de Nicéville, 1890 Burma, Thailand
- E. k. marana Corbet, 1937 Peninsular Malaya, Langkawi Island
- E. k. atys Fruhstorfer, 1906 Sumatra
- E. k. mitschkei Lathy, 1913 Nias
