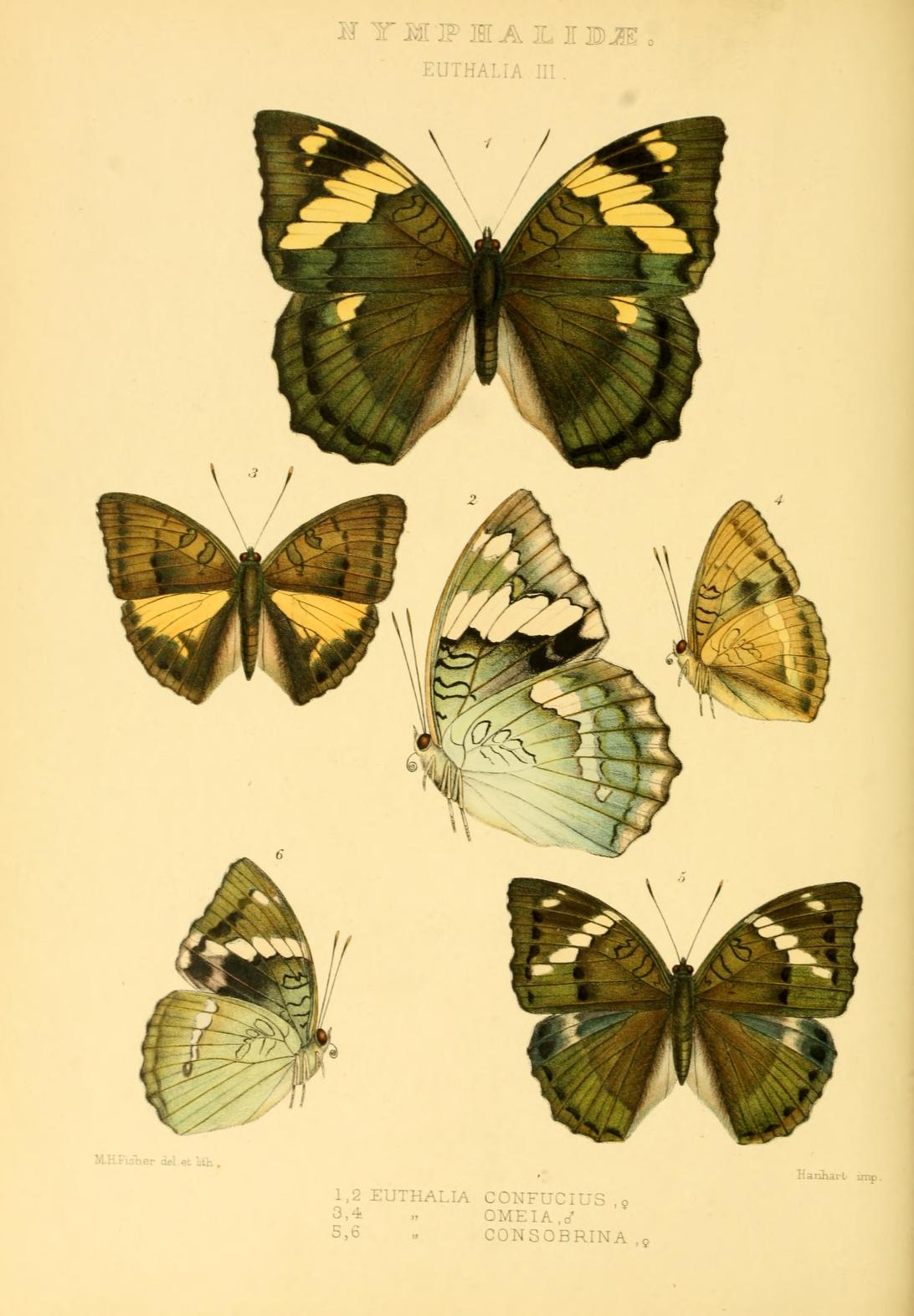
- Euthalia confucius in Rhopalocera Exotica

Scientific classification
- Kingdom: Animalia
- Phylum: Arthropoda
- Class: Insecta
- Order: Lepidoptera
- Family: Nymphalidae
- Genus: Euthalia
- Species: E. confucius

Binomial name
- Euthalia confucius (Westwood, 1850)

= Euthalia confucius =

Species of butterfly

Euthalia confucius is a butterfly of the family Nymphalidae (Limenitidinae). It is found in Burma, Tibet, China and Vietnam (subspecies gibbsi Monastyrskii & Devyatkin, 2003). Subspecies E. c. sadona Tytler, 1940 is described from Yunnan. It is a lovely species, differing from Euthalia patala in having on the forewing 3 instead of 2 whitish subapical spots, and in the more variegated under surface of the hindwings.
