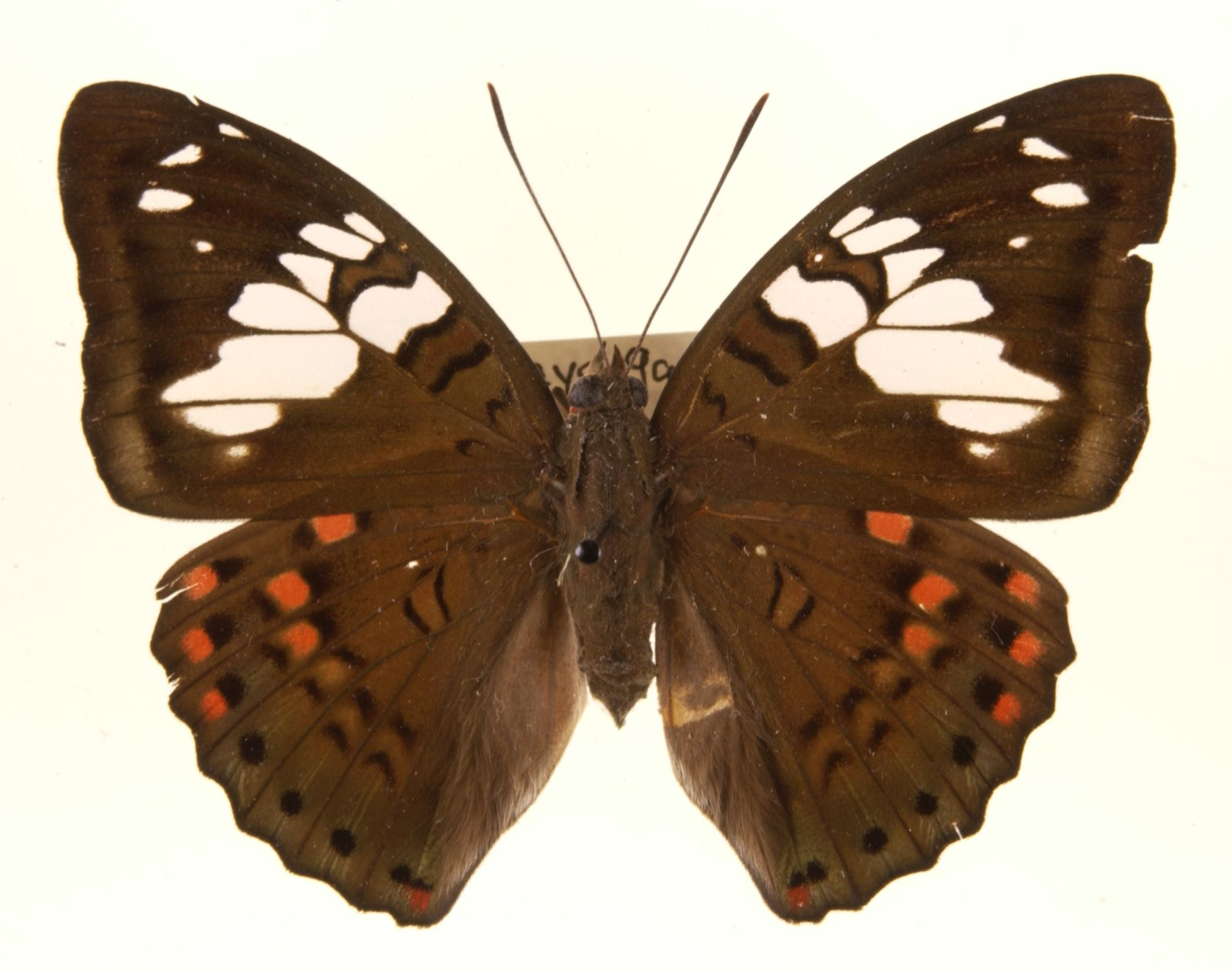

Scientific classification
- Kingdom: Animalia
- Phylum: Arthropoda
- Clade: Pancrustacea
- Class: Insecta
- Order: Lepidoptera
- Family: Nymphalidae
- Genus: Euthalia
- Species: E. malaccana

Binomial name
- Euthalia malaccana (Fruhstorfer, 1889)

= Euthalia malaccana =

Fruhstorfer's baron

Species of insect

Euthalia malaccana, or Fruhstorfer's baron, is a species of nymphalid butterfly found in the Indomalayan realm.

== Description ==
The species is characterised by a blue apical spot on the forewings, prominent in males, while females display larger apical spots. The hindwings bear reduced red spots. These features distinguish it from closely related species such as Euthalia lubentina.

== Distribution ==
This butterfly is found primarily in Southeast Asia, with records from northern Thailand, the Malay Peninsula, and the Sunda Islands.

Its presence in India remained questionable, with records identified as subspecies of Euthalia adonia. The species' presence in India was confirmed through a citizen science observation(subject to further scrutiny and documentation) from Arunachal Pradesh’s Lepa Rada district.

== Subspecies ==
- Euthalia malaccana malaccana Assam to Peninsular Malaya, Sumatra
- Euthalia malaccana adeonides Fruhstorfer, 1904 Borneo
- Euthalia malaccana rajana Fruhstorfer, 1913 Bangka
- Euthalia malaccana adinda Fruhstorfer, 1913 Nias
- Euthalia malaccana dharma Roepke, 1938 Java
- Euthalia malaccana regulus Tsukada, 1991
