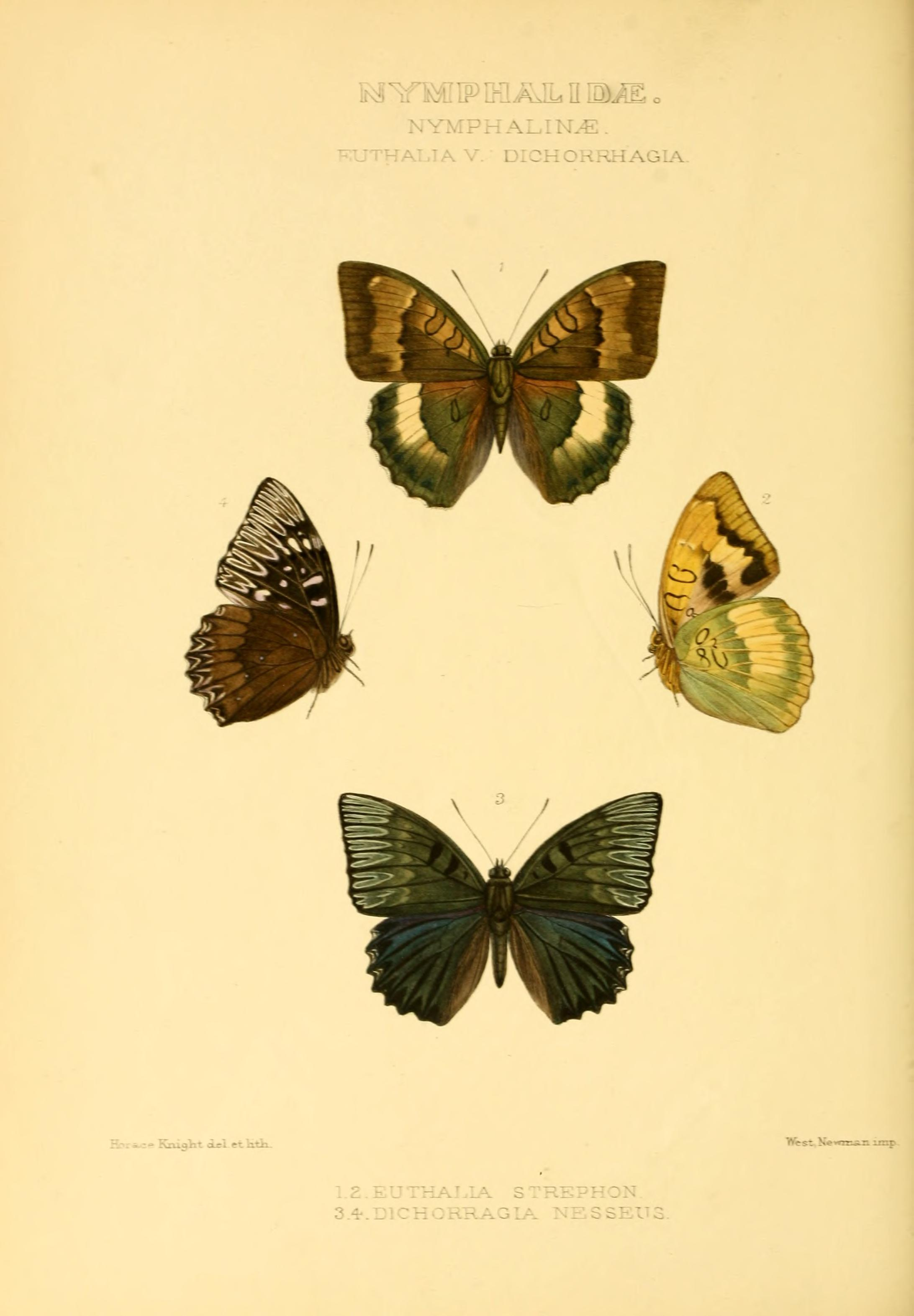
- Euthalia strephon in Rhopalocera Exotica

Scientific classification
- Kingdom: Animalia
- Phylum: Arthropoda
- Class: Insecta
- Order: Lepidoptera
- Family: Nymphalidae
- Genus: Euthalia
- Species: E. strephon

Binomial name
- Euthalia strephon Grose-Smith, 1893

= Euthalia strephon =

Species of butterfly

Euthalia strephon is a butterfly of the family Nymphalidae (Limenitidinae). It is endemic to China.

== Description ==
Original.

Euthalia strephon

Upperside. Olivaceous green. Anterior wings crossed beyond the middle from the costal to the submedian nervures by a pale greenish-yellow band, widest on the costa, narrowest between the two upper median nervules ; a small yellowish somewhat elongate spot near the costal margin and a larger oval spot of same colour at the outer edge of the band beneath it ; the space between and on each side of the dark bars which cross the cell is also pale greenish yellow. Posterior wings with a pale greenish-yellow curved band following the contour of the outer margin from the middle of the costa, gradually narrowing and becoming obsolete towards the lowest median nervule; an oval dark ring crossing the cell and an indistinct submarginal row of dark green hastate spots.: Underside. Olivaceous yellow. On the anterior wings the yellowish-green band is more clearly defined and edged on each side with black, narrowly towards the costa, gradually and irregularly becoming broader towards the submedian nervure, where it ceases. Posterior wings with the pale greenish-yellow curved band as above, bordered on each side with olivaceous green, the space round the spots in the cell and on the outer margin being the same colour as the central band.

Expanse of wings 2and 1/4 inches.

Nearest to Euthalia omeia Leech, which it resembles in colour, but the posterior wings are very different.

Five specimens were sent, apparently all males.
