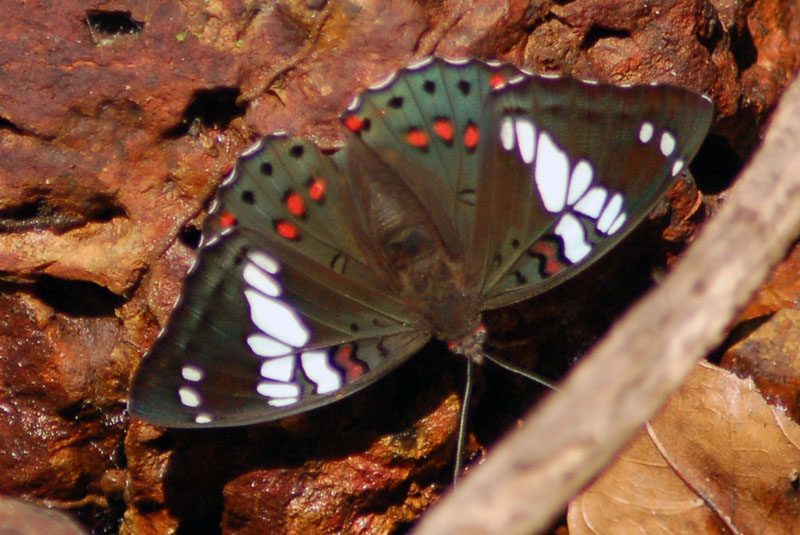
- Euthalia lubentina

Scientific classification
- Domain: Eukaryota
- Kingdom: Animalia
- Phylum: Arthropoda
- Class: Insecta
- Order: Lepidoptera
- Family: Nymphalidae
- Tribe: Adoliadini
- Genus: Euthalia; Hübner, [1819]

Species
- Numerous, see text

= Euthalia =

Genus of brush-footed butterflies

Euthalia (from Ancient Greek: Euthalia Ευθαλια "flower", "bloom") is a genus of brush-footed butterflies. They are commonly called barons or (like some relatives in Bassarona and Dophla) dukes. They are large, broad-winged, butterflies. The members of this genus vary quite a bit in size and wing shape – in some the forewing is completely rounded, in others pointed or slightly sickle-shaped. The ground colour of the upper side is brown to black, not infrequently with a metallic sheen. They often have white, yellow, or orange spots or bands. The underparts are usually brownish and camouflage-coloured.

== Species ==
Listed alphabetically:

- Euthalia aconthea Cramer, 1777 – common baron or baron
- Euthalia adonia Cramer, 1780
- Euthalia agnis Vollenhoven, 1862
- Euthalia alpheda Godart, 1824 – streaked baron
- Euthalia alpherakyi Oberthür, 1907
- Euthalia amabilis Staudinger, 1896
- Euthalia amanda Hewitson, 1861 – Sulawesi gaudy baron
- Euthalia anosia Moore, 1858 – grey baron
- Euthalia apex Tsukada, 1991
- Euthalia aristides Oberthür, 1907
- Euthalia bunzoi Sugiyama, 1996
- Euthalia confucius Westwood, 1850
- Euthalia curvifascia Tytler, 1915
- Euthalia djata Distant & Pryer, 1887
- Euthalia duda Staudinger, 1855 – blue duchess
- Euthalia durga Moore, 1858 – blue duke (often placed in Bassarona)
- Euthalia eriphylae de Nicéville, 1891
- Euthalia formosana Fruhstorfer, 1908
- Euthalia franciae Gray, 1846 – French duke
- Euthalia guangdongensis Wu, 1994
- Euthalia hebe Fruhstorfer, 1908
- Euthalia heweni Huang, 2002
- Euthalia hoa Monastyrskii, 2005 Vietnam, China
- Euthalia insulae Hall, 1930
- Euthalia iapis
- Euthalia ipona Fruhstorfer, 1913
- Euthalia irrubescens Grose-Smith, 1893
- Euthalia kanda Moore, 1859
- Euthalia kardama Moore, 1859
- Euthalia kameii Koiwava, 1996
- Euthalia khama Alphéraky, 1895 – Naga duke
- Euthalia khambounei Uehara & Yokochi, 2001
- Euthalia koharai Yokochi, 2005
- Euthalia kosempona Fruhstorfer, 1908
- Euthalia linpingensis Mell, 1935
- Euthalia lubentina Cramer, 1777 – gaudy baron
- Euthalia lusiada 9C. & R. Felder, 1863
- Euthalia masumi Yokochi, 2009 China, Guangxi
- Euthalia pacifica Mell, 1934
- Euthalia pulchella Lee, 1979
- Euthalia mahadeva Moore, 1859
- Euthalia malaccana Fruhstorfer, 1899 – Fruhstorfer's baron
- Euthalia malapana Shirozu & Chung, 1958
- Euthalia merta Moore, 1859 – white-tipped baron
- Euthalia mingyiae Huang, 2002
- Euthalia monina Fabricius, 1787 – powdered baron
- Euthalia nais Forster, 1771 – baronet
- Euthalia nara Moore, 1859 – bronze duke
- Euthalia niepelti Strand, 1916
- Euthalia omeia Leech, 1891
- Euthalia patala Kollar, 1844 – grand duchess
- Euthalia perlella Chou & Wang, 1994
- Euthalia phemius Doubleday, 1848 – white-edged blue baron
- Euthalia pratti Leech, 1891
- Euthalia purchella Lee, 1979
- Euthalia pyrrha Leech, 1892
- Euthalia sahadeva Moore, 1859 – green duke
- ?Euthalia staudingeri Leech, 1891
- Euthalia strephon Grose-Smith, 1893
- Euthalia suprema Uehara & Yokochi, 2001
- Euthalia tanagra Staudinger, 1889
- Euthalia telchinia Ménétriés, 1857 – blue baron
- Euthalia tinna Fruhstorfer, 1906
- Euthalia thibetana Poujade, 1885
- Euthalia tsangpoi Huang, 1999
- Euthalia undosa Fruhstorfer, 1906
- Euthalia whiteheadi Grose-Smith, 1889
- Euthalia yasuyukii Yoshino, 1998

The common earl, now in Tanaecia, was formerly placed in Euthalia.
