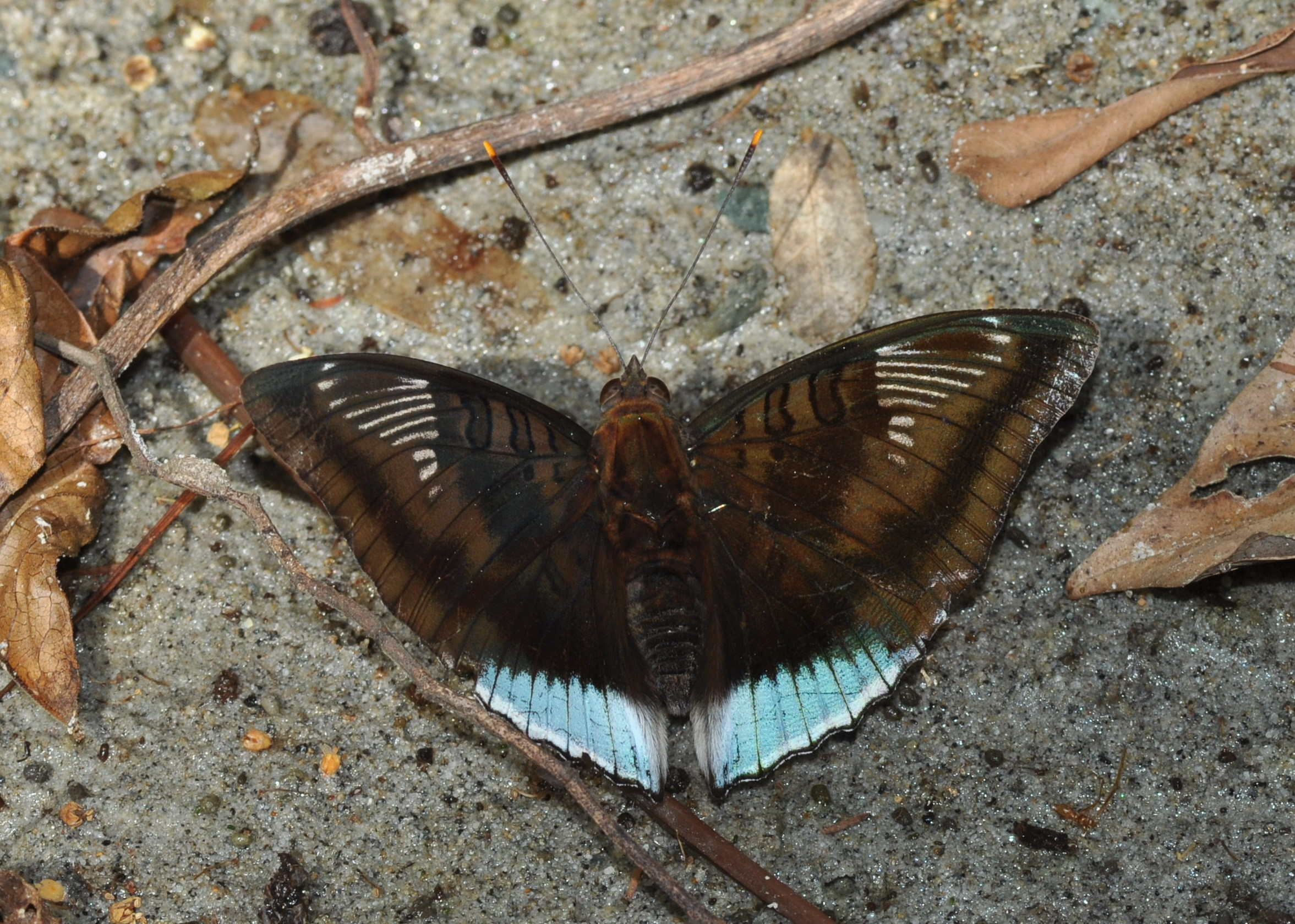

Scientific classification
- Kingdom: Animalia
- Phylum: Arthropoda
- Clade: Pancrustacea
- Class: Insecta
- Order: Lepidoptera
- Family: Nymphalidae
- Genus: Euthalia
- Species: E. phemius

Binomial name
- Euthalia phemius Doubleday, 1848

= Euthalia phemius =

White-edged blue baron

Species of butterfly

Euthalia phemius, the white-edged blue baron, is a species of butterfly of the family Nymphalidae. It is found in Sikkim, Assam, Myanmar, and southern China (S.Yunnan, including Hong Kong, Peninsular Malaya and Indo-China.

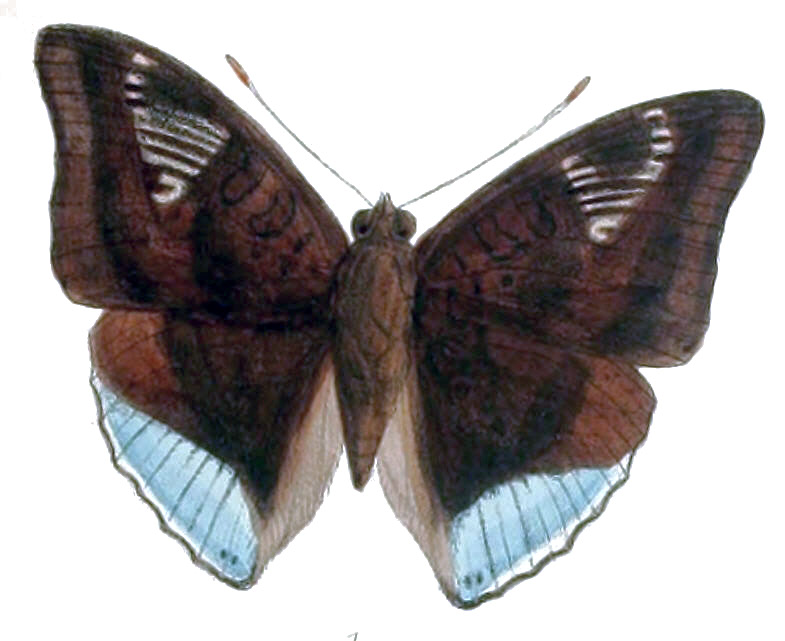

The wingspan of the moths is 60 to 85 millimeters. The species is characterized by marked sexual dimorphism. Both sexes share a brownish base colour on the upper sides of the wings. In males, a radiating whitish line pattern stands out in the postdiscal region of the forewings, as well as a light blue region above the inner margin of the hindwings, which is edged in white. In English, the species is therefore called the White-edged Blue Baron The anal angle is pointed. Females differ by a white band running from the middle of the leading edge of the forewings to the inner angle, and by the absence of the blue region on the hindwings. The undersides of the wings of both sexes are ochre to reddish-brown and replicate the white markings of the forewings.

Mature caterpillars are green. It resembles a twig of the foodplant. Spiky outgrowths extend laterally from each body segment. The dorsal line is yellow.

Euthalia phemius primarily inhabits moist deciduous forests.They fly throughout the year, but are most active in June and July. They like to feed on damp soil to obtain moisture and minerals. The caterpillars feed on the leaves of the lychee tree (Litchi chinensis ) or mango ( Mangifera indica ).

== Subspecies ==
The subspecies of Euthalia phemius found in India is -

- Euthalia phemius phemius Doubleday, 1848 – Sylhet White-edged Blue Baron

The Borneo subspecies is E. p. euphemia Staudinger, [1897]
