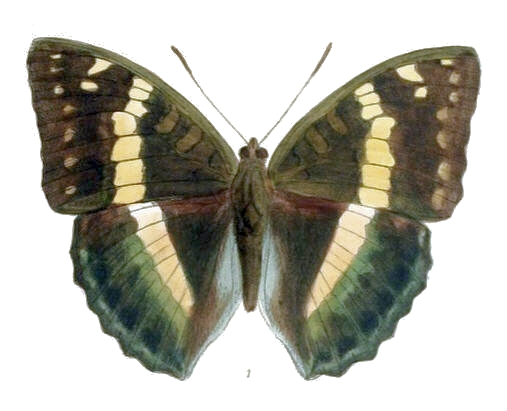

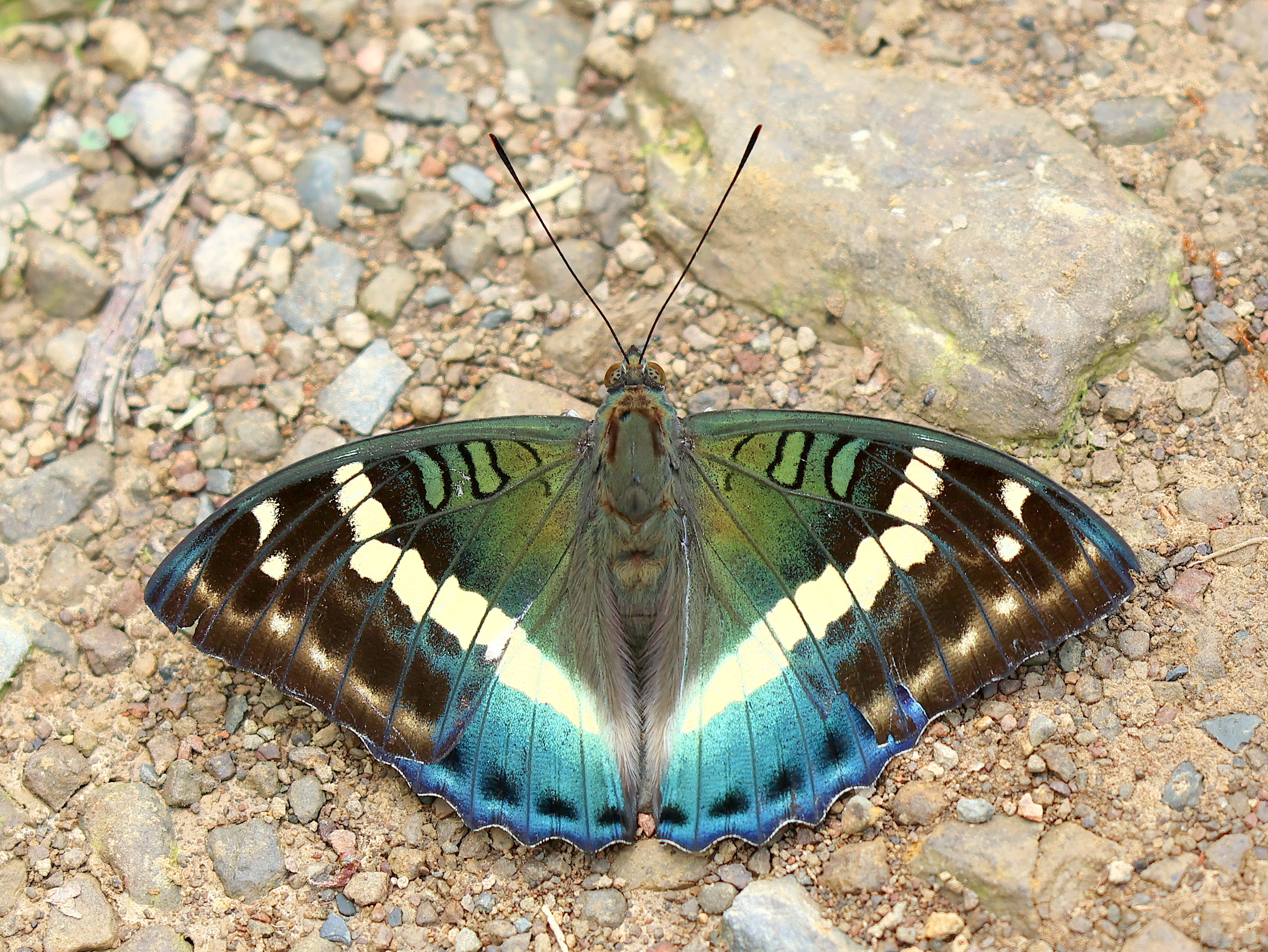

Scientific classification
- Kingdom: Animalia
- Phylum: Arthropoda
- Class: Insecta
- Order: Lepidoptera
- Family: Nymphalidae
- Genus: Euthalia
- Species: E. franciae

Binomial name
- Euthalia franciae (Gray, 1846)

Synonyms
- Adolias franciae Gray, 1846; Bassarona franciae

= Euthalia franciae =

French duke

Species of butterfly

Euthalia franciae, the French duke, is a species of nymphalid butterfly found in the Indomalayan realm. Characteristic of the under surface is the delicate blue-green, bronze-like ground-colour which is richly suffused with silver-grey, and on the hindwings adorned with stripes of pale lilac, especially in specimens of the dry-season. The forewing underside with a large quadrate black spot at the anal angle, longitudinal band broad and clearer white.

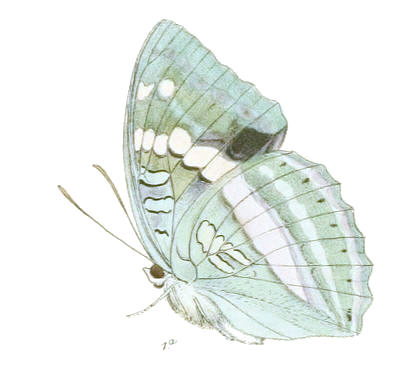

== Subspecies ==
- Euthalia franciae franciae (Nepal, Sikkim, Bhutan)
- Euthalia franciae attenuata (Tytler) (Upper Burma)
- Euthalia franciae raja (C. & R. Felder, 1859) (Assam, Yunnan)
