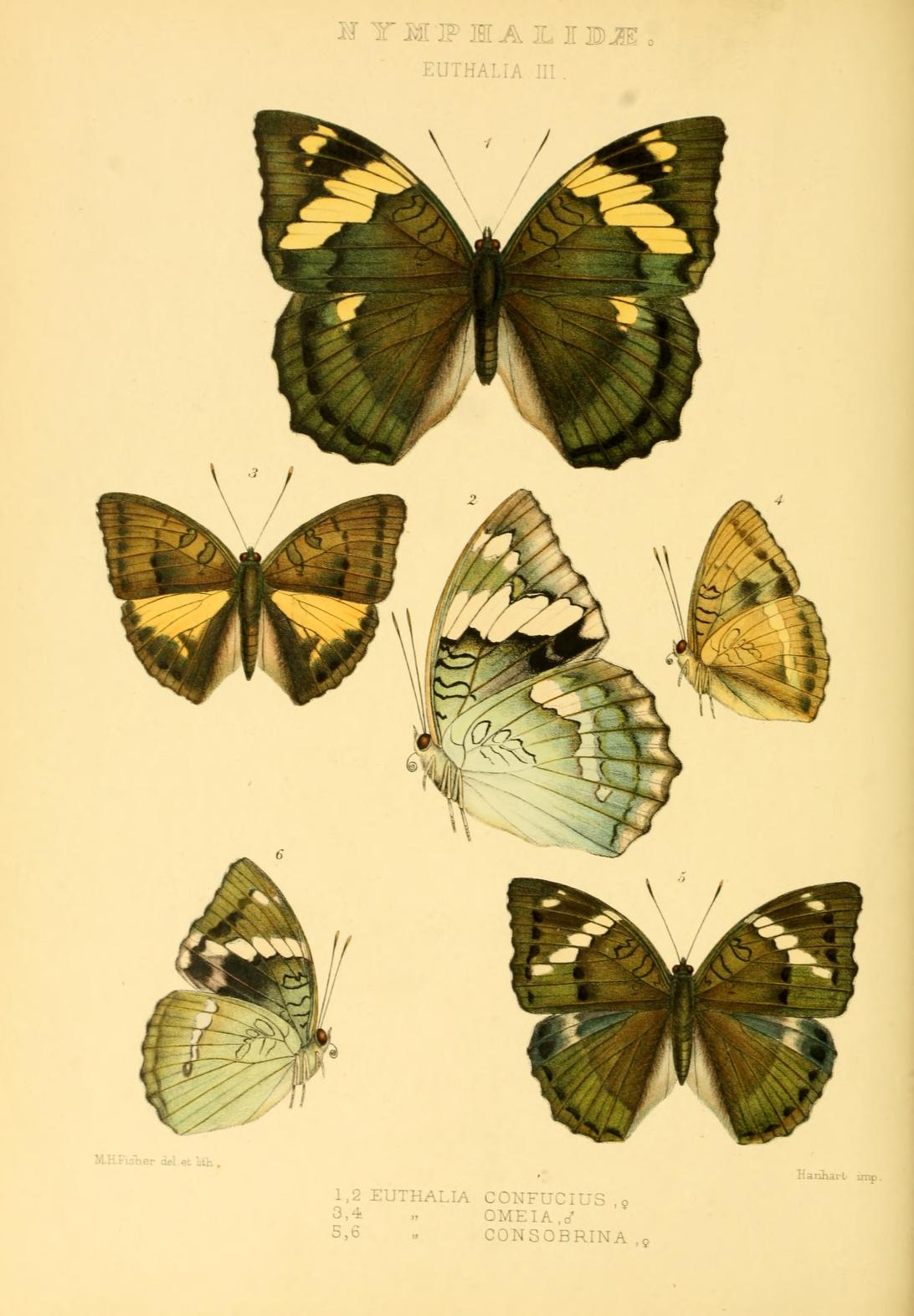
- Euthalia omeia in Rhopalocera Exotica

Scientific classification
- Kingdom: Animalia
- Phylum: Arthropoda
- Class: Insecta
- Order: Lepidoptera
- Family: Nymphalidae
- Genus: Euthalia
- Species: E. omeia

Binomial name
- Euthalia omeia Leech, 1891

= Euthalia omeia =

Species of butterfly

Euthalia omeia is a butterfly of the family Nymphalidae (Limenitidinae). It is endemic to China.

== Description ==
Original. EUTHALIA OMEIA, Sp. N.

Male. Pale yellowish-brown, with olivaceous reflections; the markings are very like those of Euthalia (Adolias) anyte, Hew. but the outer edge of the central band is less indented; the second transverse band is nearer the outer margin, and there are no indications of any round spots on the space between these bands; below the median nervure is a large, ill-defined, triangular, fuscous-brown patch, limited externally by the central band, and extending upwards as far as the second median nervule. Secondaries brown, tinged with olivaceous, with a broad yellow patch occupying the costal half of the wing, but not quite extending to the outer margin. Under surface yellowish, the inner marginal area of secondaries tinged with green; the markings are similar to those of E. anyte, but there are no pale spots on the primaries, and those on the secondaries are not well defined. Antennae black, with the club broadly tipped with yellow above, and entirely fulvous beneath. ‘Expanse, 70 mm. Omei-Shan, June and July. The broad yellow patch on secondaries at once distinguishes this species from its congeners.
