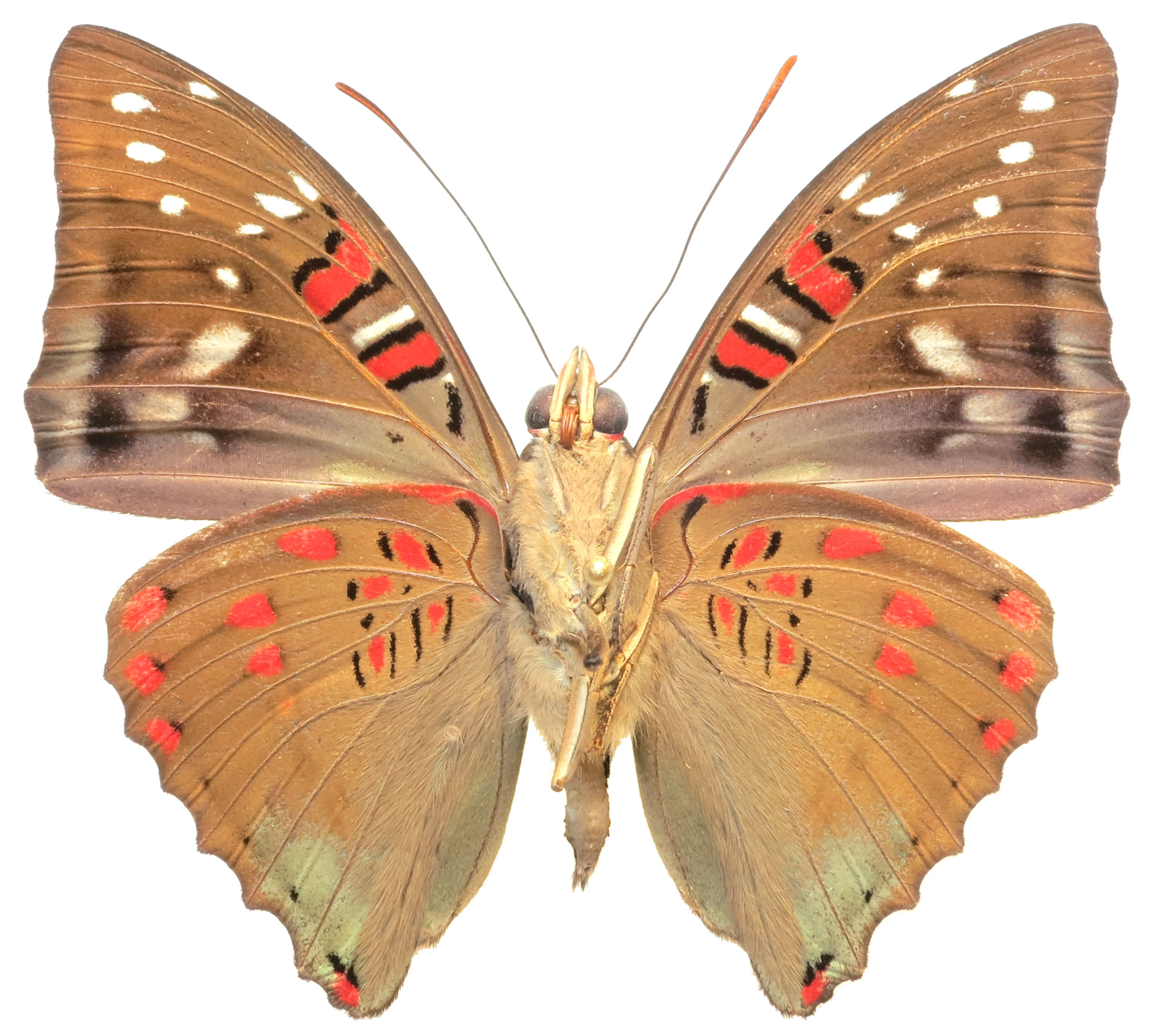
- E. whiteheadi - Mount Dempo, Indonesia

Scientific classification
- Kingdom: Animalia
- Phylum: Arthropoda
- Class: Insecta
- Order: Lepidoptera
- Family: Nymphalidae
- Genus: Euthalia
- Species: E. whiteheadi

Binomial name
- Euthalia whiteheadi Grose-Smith, 1889

= Euthalia whiteheadi =

Species of butterfly

Euthalia whiteheadi is a butterfly of the family Nymphalidae (Limenitidinae). It is found in the Indomalayan realm. It is a larger Euthalia, with broad black margins and small white subapical spots; under surface of the hindwing almost black-violet with yellowish costal area and an oblong patch at the apex of the cell.[sensu Frustorfer - does not match original description]

== Subspecies ==
- E. w. whiteheadi Borneo
- E. w. mariae Fruhstorfer, 1904 Thailand, Peninsular Malaya, Sumatra
- E. w. culminicola Fruhstorfer, 1894 Java
