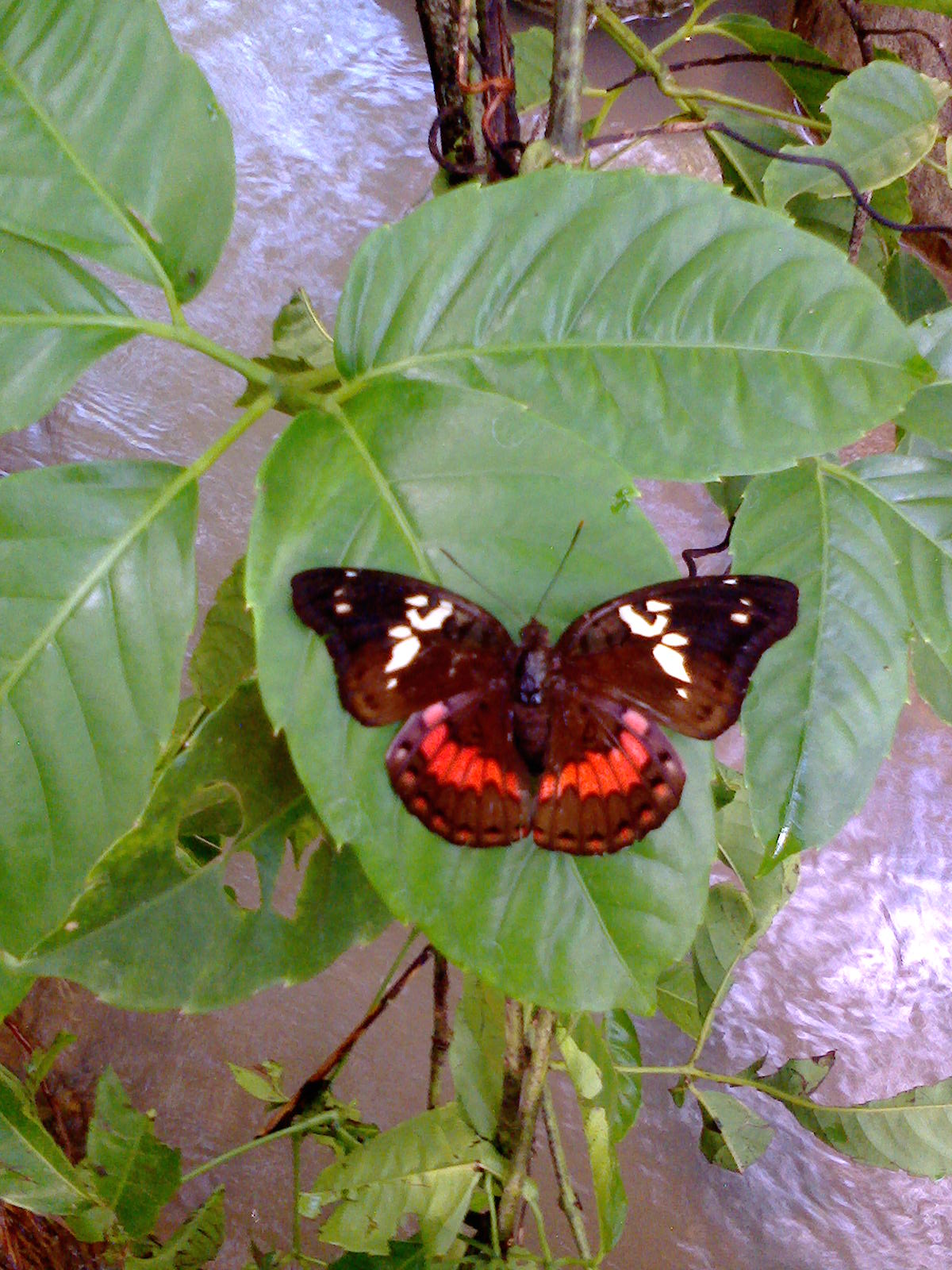
- Female from Sungai Pontolo, North Gorontalo, Sulawesi

Scientific classification
- Kingdom: Animalia
- Phylum: Arthropoda
- Class: Insecta
- Order: Lepidoptera
- Family: Nymphalidae
- Genus: Euthalia
- Species: E. amanda

Binomial name
- Euthalia amanda (Hewitson, 1862)

Synonyms
- Adolias amanda Hewitson, 1861; Euthalia amanda rubicundus Tsukada, 1991

= Euthalia amanda =

Species of butterfly

Euthalia amanda, the Sulawesi gaudy baron, is a butterfly endemic to Sulawesi, Indonesia. It was first described by William Chapman Hewitson in 1862.

== Description ==
Male very plainly marked, above black with dark green marginal area of the forewing and greenish steel-blue border of the hindwing; the latter in addition with a black postdiscal band, a median zigzag line and conspicuous sub marginal, intranerval scallops. Female has the forewing marked as in lubentina; the hindwing with a red median band varying in width according to the locality, and with black anteterminal dots edged with red distally. Under surface of male grey-black, forewing with two red cellular streaks; female grey suffused with bluish; hindwing with two rows of red spots, as in male.

== Subspecies ==
- E. a. amanda (Sulawesi, Buton)
- E. a. selayarensis Tsukada, 1991 (Selayar)
- E. a. periya Fruhstorfer, 1913 (Banggai) darker ground-colour, the larger white spots on the forewing and broad, more intensely red bands on the hind wings; these characteristics are in both sexes even more evident on the under surface.
- E. a. irauana Jumalon, 1975 (Palawan)
