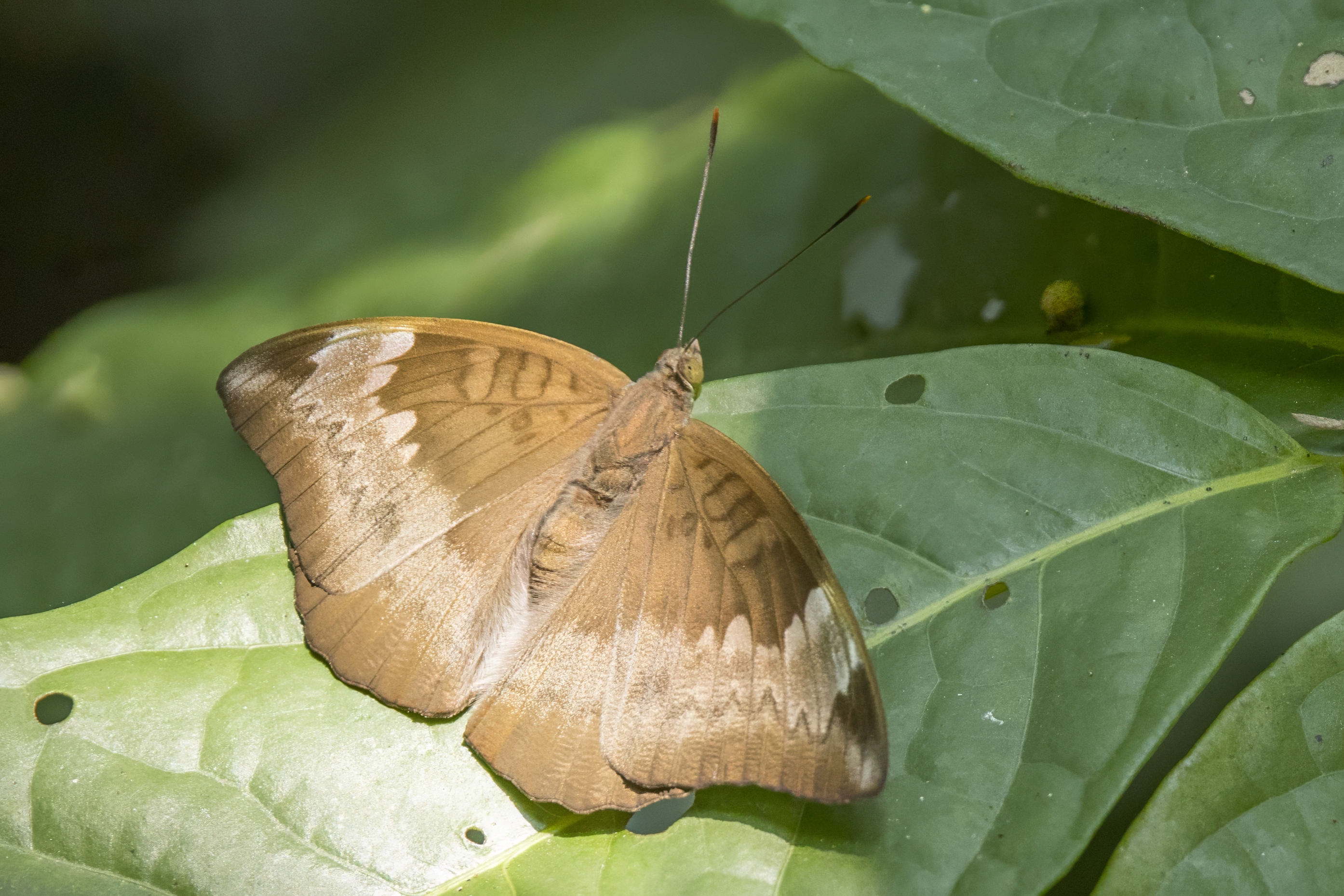
- E. m. sastra, Laos

Scientific classification
- Kingdom: Animalia
- Phylum: Arthropoda
- Clade: Pancrustacea
- Class: Insecta
- Order: Lepidoptera
- Family: Nymphalidae
- Genus: Euthalia
- Species: E. monina

Binomial name
- Euthalia monina (Moore, 1859)

Synonyms
- Papilio monina Fabricius, 1787; Adolias ramada Moore, 1859; Nora perakana Fruhstorfer, 1899; Nora gardineri Fruhstorfer, 1906; Adolias kesava Moore, 1859; Euthalia rangoonensis C. Swinhoe, 1890; Adolias salia Moore, 1857

= Euthalia monina =

Species of butterfly

Euthalia monina, the powdered baron or Malay baron, is a species of nymphalid butterfly. The species was first described by Frederic Moore in 1859.

== Subspecies ==
- E. m. monina (Peninsular Malaya, Singapore, Langkawi) – Malay baron
- E. m. insularis Eliot, 1978 – (Peninsular Malaysia)
- E. m. kesava (Moore, 1859) (Sikkim to Assam, Myanmar, southern Yunnan) – powdered baron
- E. m. discipilota Moore, 1878 – (northern Myanmar)
- E. m. remias Corbet – (central Myanmar to Thailand)
- E. m. varius Tsukada, 1991
- E. m. grahami Riley & Godfrey, 1921 – (Peninsular Thailand)
- E. m. sastra Fruhstorfer – (Indochina)
- E. m. tudela Fruhstorfer – (southern China, Hainan)
- E. m. erana de Nicéville – (Sumatra, Batu Islands)
- E. m. cordata Weymer, 1887 – (Nias Island)
- E. m. ilka Fruhstorfer, 1899 – (northern Borneo)
- E. m. natuna Fruhstorfer, 1906 – (Natuna Islands)
- E. m. indras Vollenhoven – (southern Borneo)
- E. m. salia (Moore, 1857) – (Java)
- E. m. tanagra Staudinger – (Palawan)
- E. m. suluana Fruhstorfer, 1902 – (Sulu Island)
- E. m. sramana Fruhstorfer, 1913 – (Bali)
- E. m. obsoleta Fruhstorfer, 1897 – (Lombok)
- E. m. jiwabaruana Eliot, 1980 – (Mentawai Islands)

Several forms are described for subspecies monina, including form monina, decorata (Butler, 1869) and gardineri (Fruhstorfer, 1906).

== Description ==
The wingspan of these butterflies can reach about 50–70 millimetres (2.0–2.8 in). The males of Euthalia monina have blackish or dark brown wings, with a blue-green iridescence on the outer part. The wings of the females are dark brown with pale greyish markings.

== Biology ==
Known host plants of the caterpillars include: Clidemia hirta (Melastomataceae), Diospyros melanoxylon (Ebenaceae), Macaranga hullettii, Mallotus subpeltatus (Euphorbiaceae), and Shorea robusta (Dipterocarpaceae).

== Distribution and habitat ==
This species can be found in Asia, mainly in Borneo, Sumatra, Java, Peninsular Malaya, Sikkim - Assam, Myanmar, Cambodia and Thailand. This butterfly prefers small clearings, glades and trails in primary rainforests, at an elevation of 0–1,000 metres (0–3,281 ft) above sea level.
