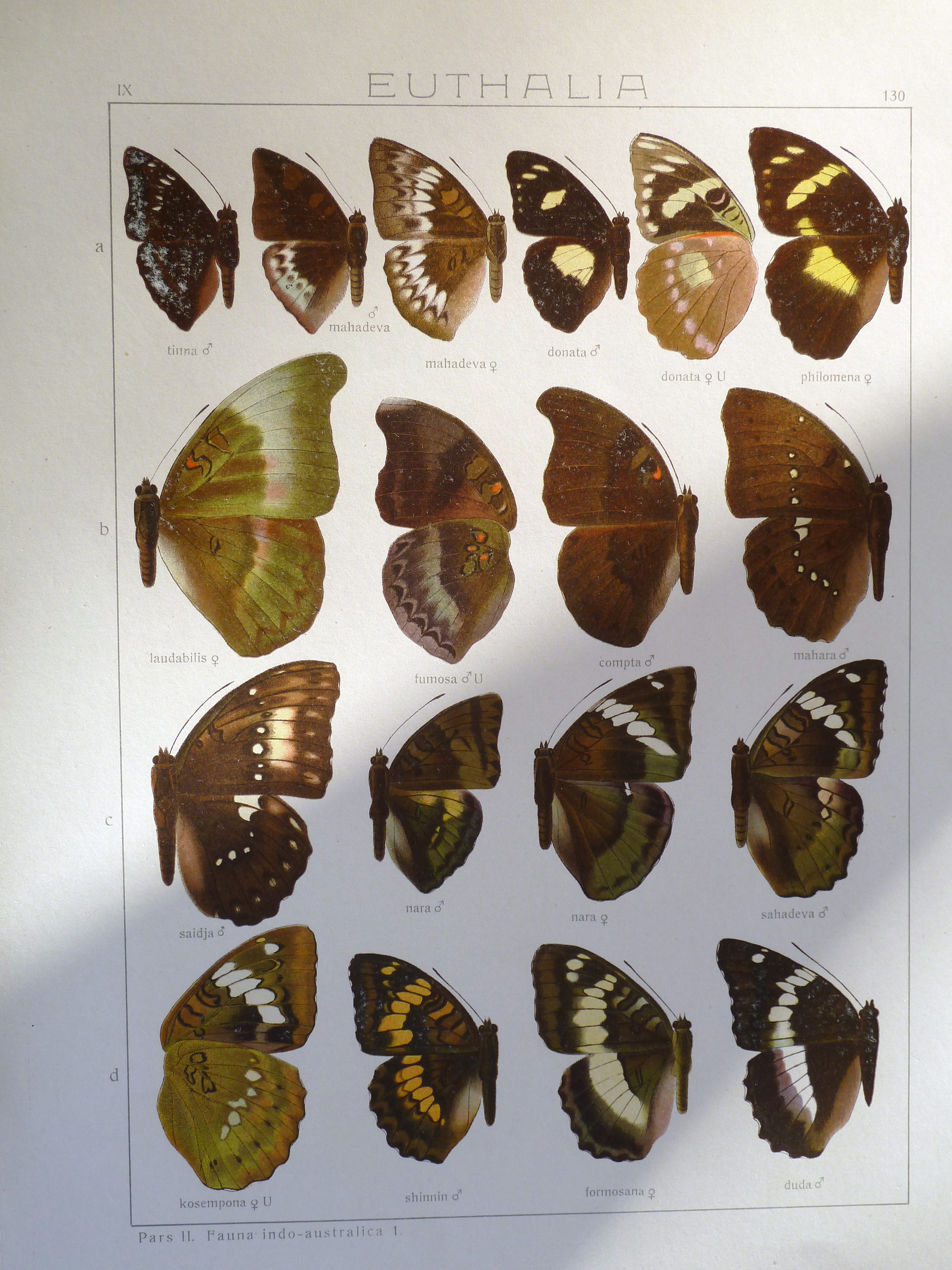
- Euthalia mahadeva in Seitz

Scientific classification
- Domain: Eukaryota
- Kingdom: Animalia
- Phylum: Arthropoda
- Class: Insecta
- Order: Lepidoptera
- Family: Nymphalidae
- Genus: Euthalia
- Species: E. mahadeva

Binomial name
- Euthalia mahadeva (Moore, 1859)

= Euthalia mahadeva =

Species of butterfly

Euthalia mahadeva is a butterfly of the family Nymphalidae (Limenitidinae). It is found in the Indomalayan realm.

== Description ==
Males have a dark dusky brown upperside smeared with purple on the exterior margin of the fore-wing and hind-wing with a broad band to the exterior margin, whitish anteriorly, bluish posteriorly, with a central longitudinal row of small, dusky spots. The underside is light brown, with greyish exterior margins, discoidal marks and a submarginal row of indistinct blackish spots.

== Subspecies ==
- E. m. mahadeva Java
- E. m. zichri (Butler, 1869) Borneo
- E. m. rhamases Staudinger, 1889 Philippines
- E. m. sakii de Nicéville, 1894 Sumatra
- E. m. binghami de Nicéville, 1895 Burma, Thailand
- E. m. sericea Fruhstorfer, 1896 Nias
- E. m. zichrina Fruhstorfer, 1904 Peninsular Malaya
