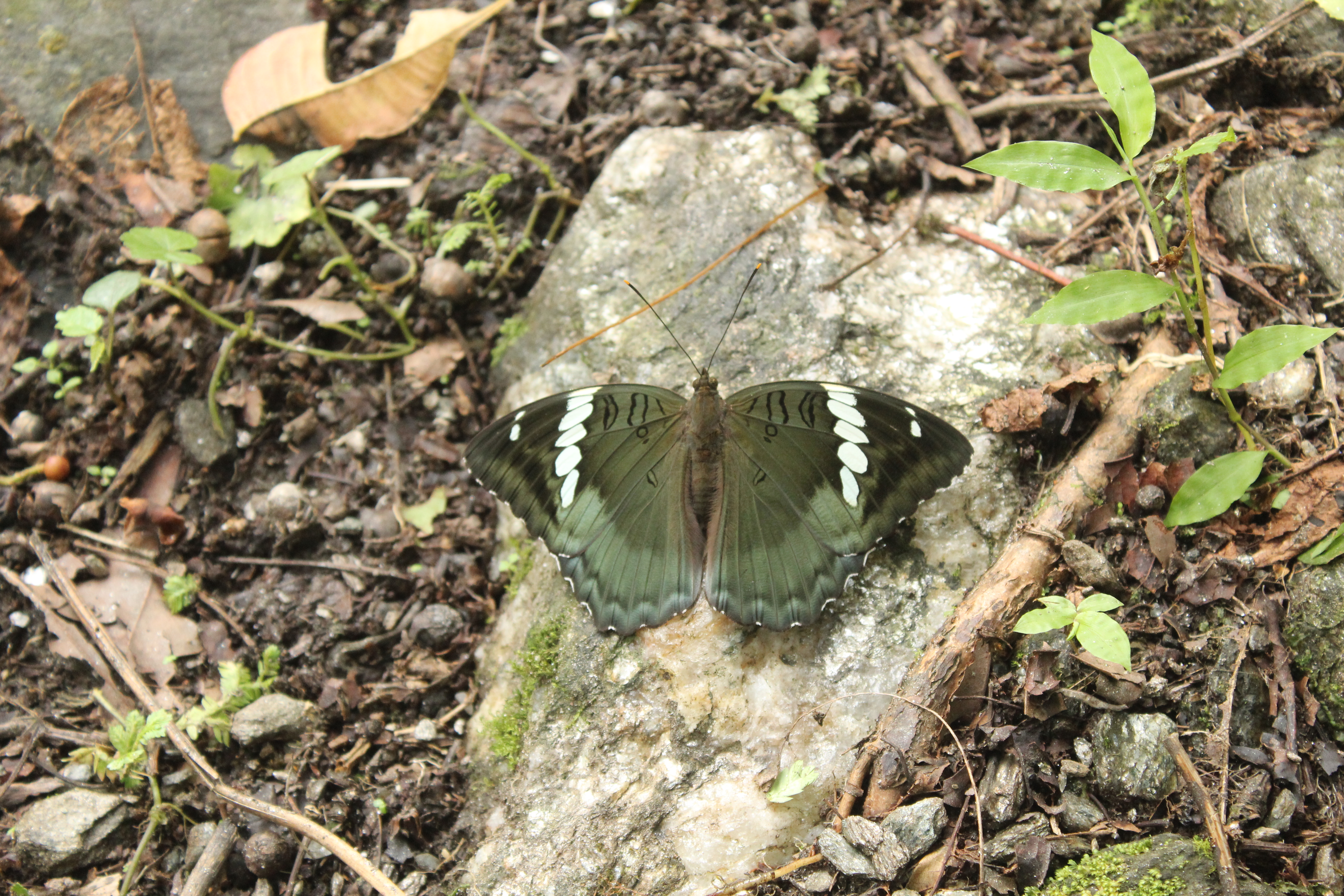
- Euthalia sahadeva in Lepidoptera Indica

Scientific classification
- Kingdom: Animalia
- Phylum: Arthropoda
- Class: Insecta
- Order: Lepidoptera
- Family: Nymphalidae
- Genus: Euthalia
- Species: E. sahadeva

Binomial name
- Euthalia sahadeva (Moore, 1859)

= Euthalia sahadeva =

Species of butterfly

Euthalia sahadeva, the green duke, is a butterfly of the family Nymphalidae (Limenitidinae). It is found in the Indomalayan realm. Male above pale olive green, marked with 5 dull whitish yellow spots united into a sort of band. In the female these spots are nearly clear white. On the hindwing the male has 6 yellowish patches.

== Subspecies ==
- E. s. sahadeva Sikkim, Bhutan
- E. s. narayana Grose-Smith & Kirby, 1891 Burma Ground-colour rather paler green than in nadaka female; on the fore wing the spots are smaller.
- E. s. nadaka Fruhstorfer, 1913 Assam small montane form.
- E. s. thawgawa Tytler, 1940 India
- E. s. yanagisawai Sugiyama, 1996 Yunnan, Sichuan

== Etymology ==
Named for the mythical Sahadeva.
