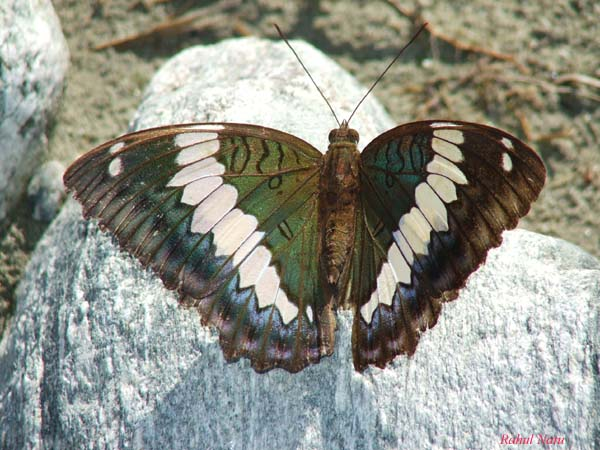

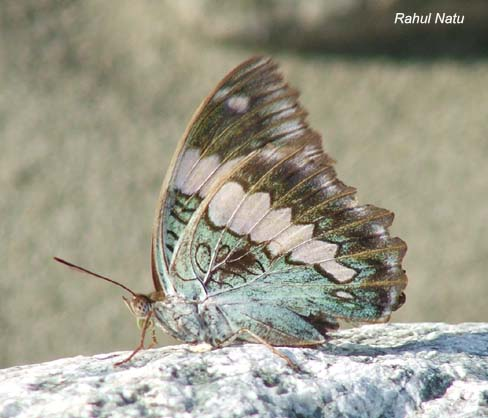

Scientific classification
- Kingdom: Animalia
- Phylum: Arthropoda
- Clade: Pancrustacea
- Class: Insecta
- Order: Lepidoptera
- Family: Nymphalidae
- Genus: Bassarona
- Species: B. durga

Binomial name
- Bassarona durga (Moore, 1858)

Synonyms
- Adolias durga Moore, [1858]; Euthalia durga

= Bassarona durga =

Blue duke

Species of butterfly

Bassarona durga, the blue duke, is a species of nymphalid butterfly found in the Himalayas.

== Description ==
Euthalia durga resembles Euthalia duda, but is much rarer; on the forewing the white median band is broader, the subapical spots smaller, on the hindwing the median area steeper and distally dentate. Under surface chiefly blue instead of yellowish-green, the distal portion of both wings nearly grey-black.

== Range ==
It is found in Sikkim, Abor Hills and Nagaland. In June 2022, it was declared as the State Butterfly of Sikkim.
