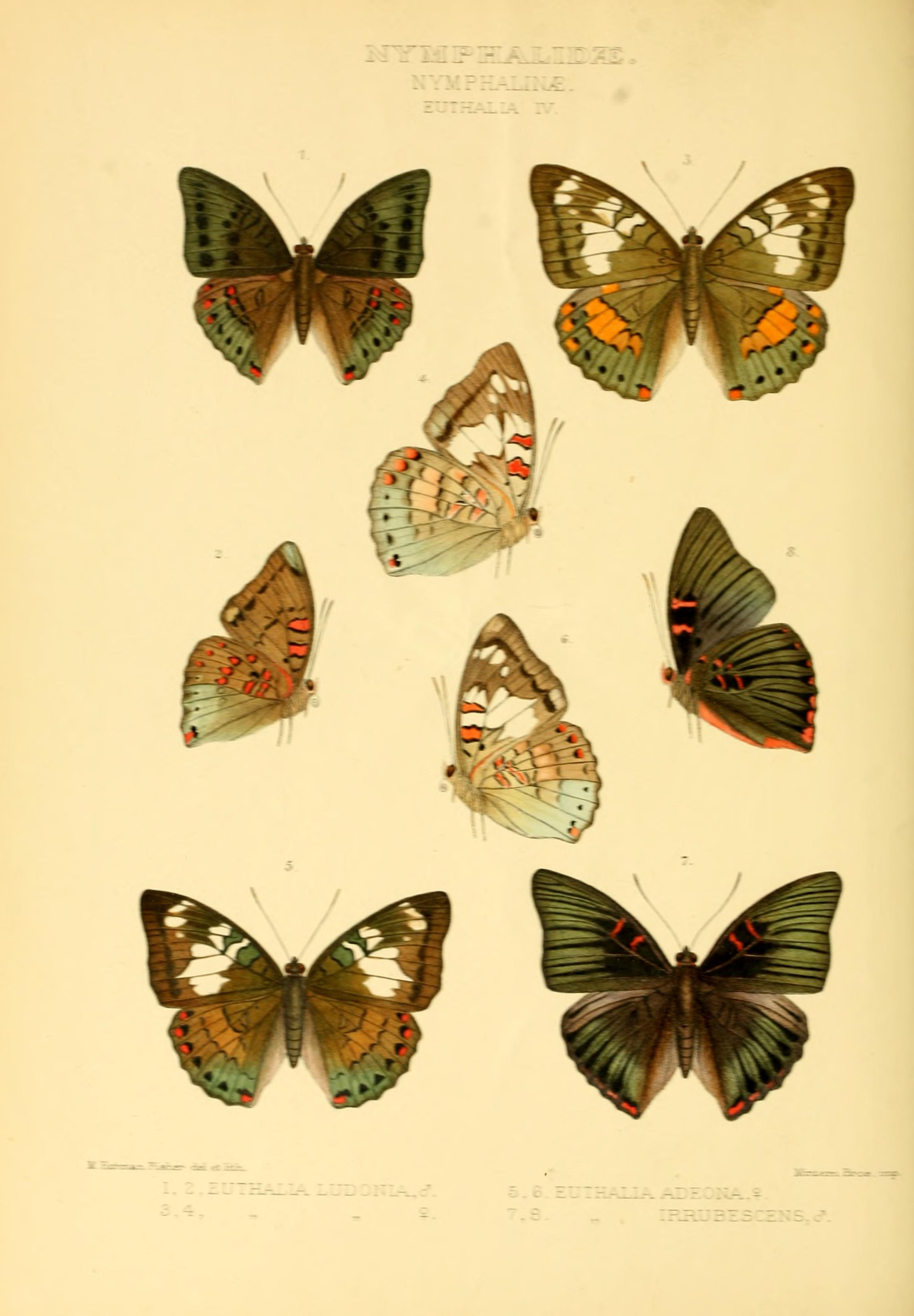
- Euthalia djata ludonia Staudinger, 1889 in Rhopalocera Exotica

Scientific classification
- Kingdom: Animalia
- Phylum: Arthropoda
- Class: Insecta
- Order: Lepidoptera
- Family: Nymphalidae
- Genus: Euthalia
- Species: E. djata

Binomial name
- Euthalia djata Distant & Pryer, 1887

= Euthalia djata =

Species of butterfly

Euthalia djata is a butterfly of the family Nymphalidae (Limenitidinae). It is found in the Indomalayan realm.

== Description ==
Original. Allied to Euthalia lubentina, Cram., but differing in the following particulars:—The male is smaller and darker, the anterior wings above are entirely without the red spots in cell and the white spots on apical portion of wing; beneath the anterior wings possess the red spots, but are totally without the white ones; the posterior wings beneath have the red costal streak confined to base, and the red submarginal spots obsolete towards anal angle.The female resembles the corresponding sex of lubentina, but the posterior wings both above and beneath are totally without the inner series of red-and-black bordered spots, and above are traversed by two waved discal black lines. Exp. wings: male, 50 millim.; female, 60 millim.

== Subspecies ==
- E. d. djata Borneo
- E. d. rubidifascia Talbot, 1929 Peninsular Malaya, Singapore
- E. d. siamica Riley & Godfrey, 1925 Thailand, Langkawi Island
- E. d. ludonia Staudinger, 1889 Palawan
