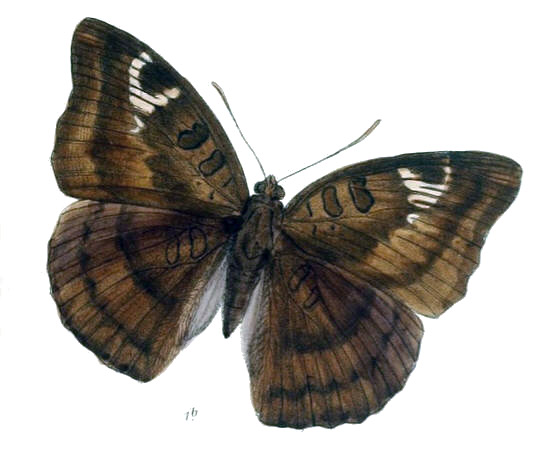

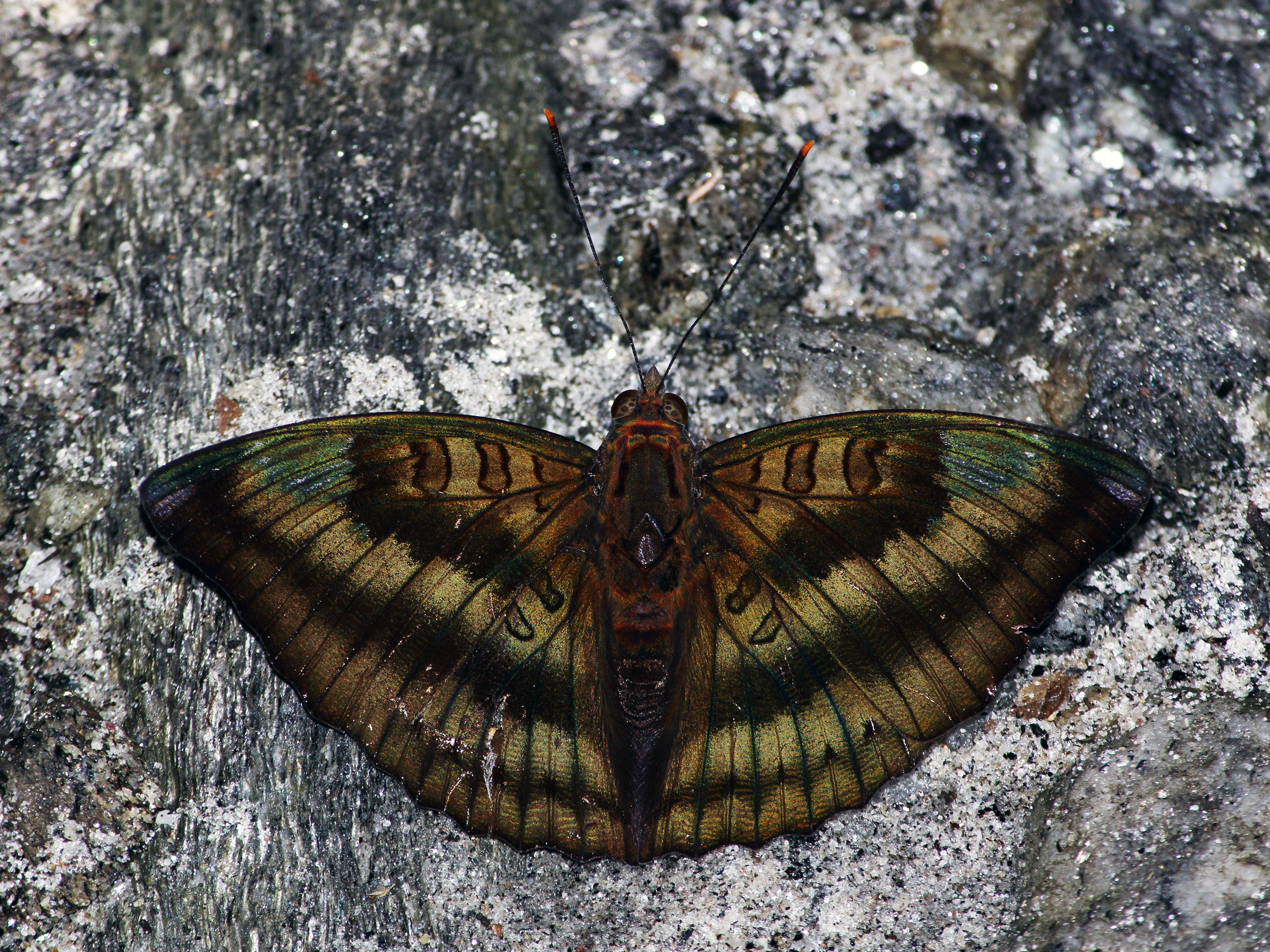

Scientific classification
- Kingdom: Animalia
- Phylum: Arthropoda
- Class: Insecta
- Order: Lepidoptera
- Family: Nymphalidae
- Genus: Euthalia
- Species: E. alpheda

Binomial name
- Euthalia alpheda (Godart, [1824])

Synonyms
- Nymphalis alpheda Godart, [1824]; Adolias alpheda Georges Cuvier, [1836]; Adolias parta Moore, [1858]; Adolias jama C. & R. Felder, [1867]; Euthalia jama f. jamida Fruhstorfer, 1906; Euthalia numerica Weymer, 1885; Euthalia aconthea bangkana Fruhstorfer, 1906; Euthalia alpheda yamuna Fruhstorfer, 1906; Euthalia keda Pendlebury, 1939

= Euthalia alpheda =

Species of butterfly

Euthalia alpheda is an Indomalayan butterfly of the family Nymphalidae (Limenitidinae). Female above deeper olive green.The transcellular white spots clear, not reaching further than the upper median, whence it continues to the inner angle in the shape of a pale yellowish-grey band.Male beneath pale grey green, female greenish with faded whitish-violet outer area.

== Subspecies ==
- E. a. alpheda (Java)
- E. a. parta (Moore, [1858]) (northern Borneo)
- E. a. jama (C. & R. Felder, [1867]) (Nepal, Sikkim, Assam)
- E. a. numerica Weymer, 1885 (Nias)
- E. a. phelada Semper, 1888 (Philippines: Luzon)
- E. a. bangkana Fruhstorfer, 1906 (Bangka) A pale form smaller than all its allies, with uncommonly deeply obscured submarginal bands. The subapical striae on the under surface of the forewings are very short, but prominent. On the female hindwing the median band is broadly suffused with violet, accompanied distally by larger brown submarginal spots
- E. a. krannon Fruhstorfer, 1906 (Borneo)
- E. a. yamuna Fruhstorfer, 1906 (Peninsular Malaya, Peninsular Thailand) lacks white median spots on the hindwings, but with broad white bands on the forewings. Above it is paler grey-brown than alpheda.
- E. a. kenodotus Fruhstorfer, 1906 (Sumatra) Male beneath deeper brown than alpheda; female forewing somewhat like yamuna but with less distinct median stripes. Hindwing with a broad white median band, broadly'suffused with purple in specimens from the North-East.
- E. a. verena Fruhstorfer, 1913 (Burma, Thailand)
- E. a. cusama Fruhstorfer, 1913 (Philippines: Mindanao)
- E. a. soregina Fruhstorfer, 1913 (Sulu Islands)
- E. a. dammermani van Eecke, 1932
- E. a. langkawica Eliot, 1980 (Langkawi)
- E. a. liaoi Schröder & Treadaway, 1982 (Philippines: Panay)
- E. a. sibuyana Schröder & Treadaway, 1982 (Philippines: Sibuyan, Romblon Group)
- E . a. rodriguezi Schröder & Treadaway, 1982 (Philippines: Palawan)
- E. a. mindorensis Schröder & Treadaway, 1982 (Philippines: Mindoro)
- E. a. leytana Schröder & Treadaway, 1982 (Philippines: Leyte)
