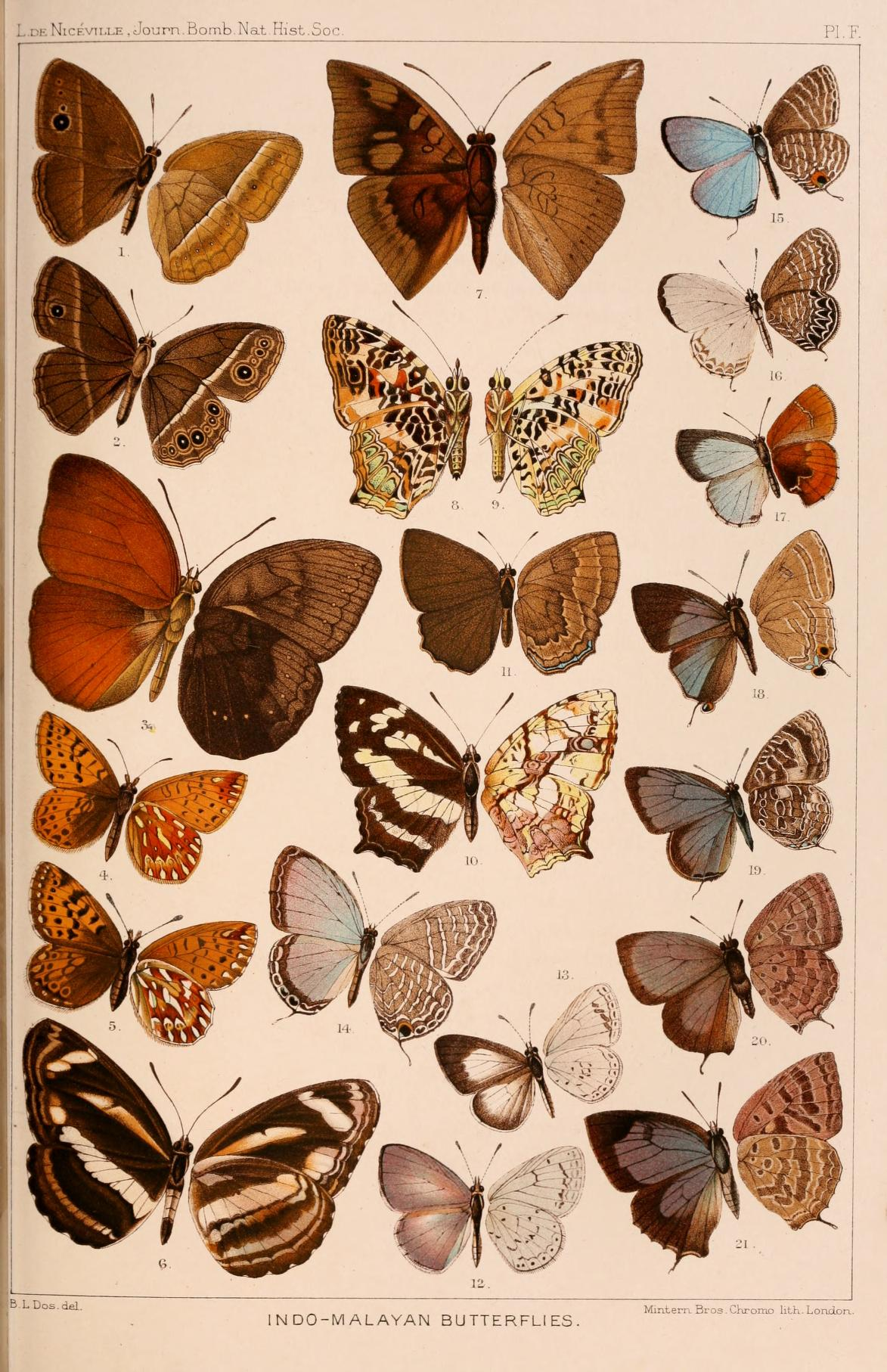
- plate accompanying original description (figure 7)
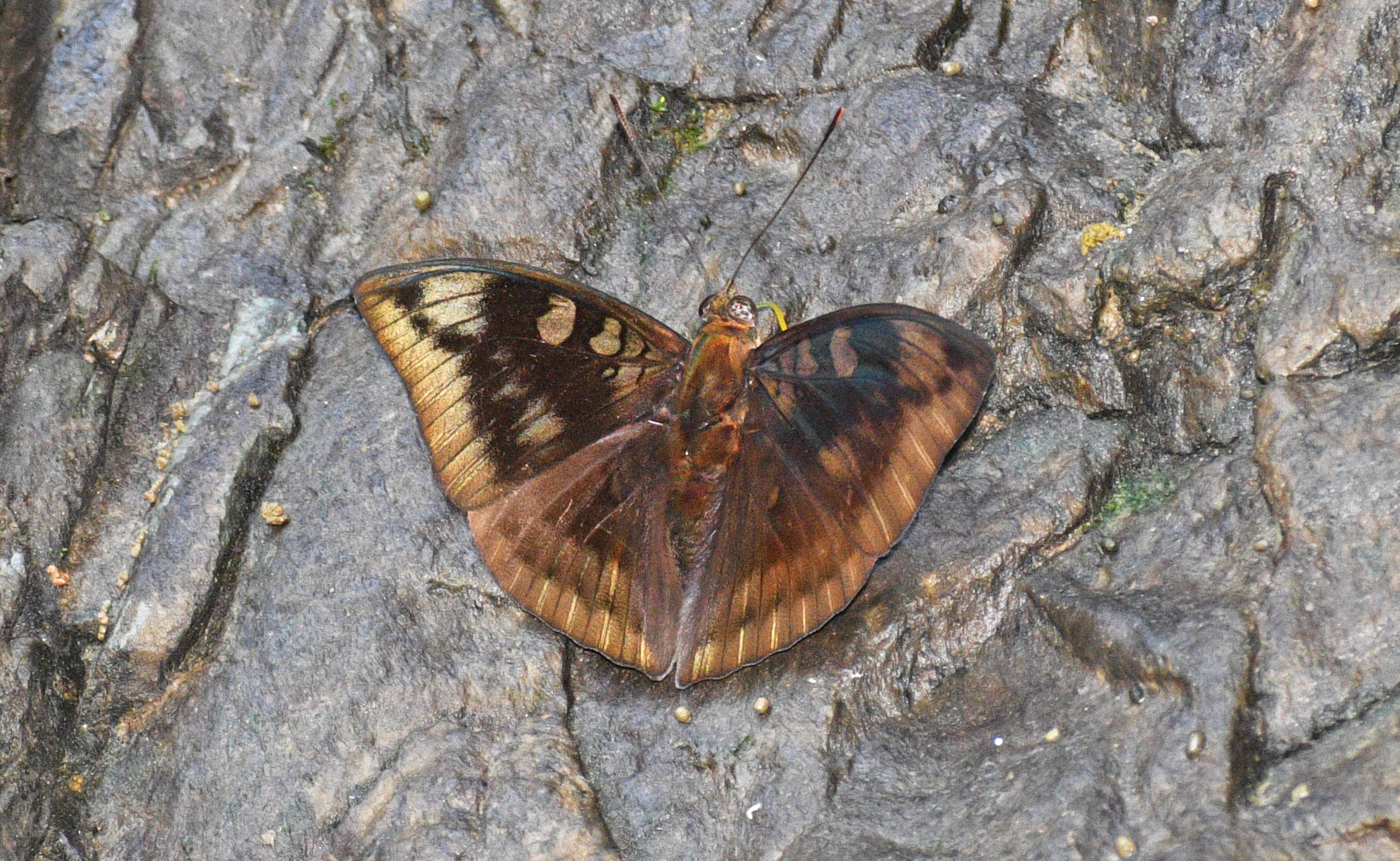

Scientific classification
- Kingdom: Animalia
- Phylum: Arthropoda
- Clade: Pancrustacea
- Class: Insecta
- Order: Lepidoptera
- Family: Nymphalidae
- Genus: Euthalia
- Species: E. eriphylae

Binomial name
- Euthalia eriphylae de Niceville, 1891

= Euthalia eriphylae =

Species of butterfly

Euthalia eriphylae is a butterfly of the family Nymphalidae (Limenitidinae). It is found in the Indomalayan realm.

== Description ==
Original EUTHALIA ERIPHYLE, n. sp., PL F, Fig. 7, male.

Habitat : Tenasserim.

Expanse : male, 25 inches.

Description : Male. Upperside, both wings shining greenish brown. Forewing with a short fuscous bar near the base of the discoidal cell; a quadrate patch of the ground-colour enclosed by a fine fuscous line across the middle of the cell; then a quadrate patch of fuscous; lastly, an oval patch of the ground-colour closing the cell; in the submedian interspace is a short curved fuscous line close to the base, and a ringlet spot at the point where the first median nervule is given off; a very broad discal fuscous band, which anteriorly bifurcates in the lower discoidal interspace and encloses a triangular patch of the ground-colour, and posteriorly encloses two spots also of the ground-colour, the anterior spot in the first median interspace linear, the posterior spot in the submedian interspace round. Hind-wing with the basal two-thirds fuscous, beyond which is an obscure series of diffused fuscous spots between the veins, neither reaching the costa nor the anal angle; a fuscous ring-spot at the end of the cell enclosing a space of the ground-colour. Underside, both wings paler than on the upperside. Forewing, discoidal cell crossed by the four usual curved fuscous lines; a submarginal curved fuscous band, anteriorly attenuated and ending in an irrorated patch of bluish-white scales at the extreme apex of the wing, posteriorly in a rather large rounded spot on the submedian fold. Hindwing with the usual fuscous linear lines in and around the discoidal cell; no other markings whatever.

Nearest to E. garuda, Moore, and at first sight giving the impression that it is only a suffused aberration of that species. As, however, Mr. H. J. Elwes, to whom I am indebted for the specimen described, possesses several other specimens exactly similar from the same locality, I think it probable that the species is a good one. From E. garuda it differs on the upperside of the forewing in having the two well- separated dark bands across the disc in that species run together in the middle; on the hindwing the basal area is much darker, and the prominent submarginal series of blackish spots of E. garuda is obsolescent. On the underside the submarginal band of the forewing ends at the apex, while in E. garuda it reaches the costa far internal to that point; lastly, in the hindwing there is no submarginal series of black points whatever.

Described from a single male from Tenasserim obtained by Major C. T. Bingham. Mr. H. J. Elwes possesses several additional specimens obtained by the same gentleman in the same locality. I am indebted to Mr. Elwes for the gift of the specimen described above.

== Subspecies ==
- E. e. eriphylae Burma (Tenasserim)
- E. e. delmana Swinhoe, 1893 Assam,.Burma
- E. e. chula Fruhstorfer, 1905 Thailand, Malaya
- E. e. lioneli Fruhstorfer, 1905 Indo-China
- E. e. raya Eliot, 1960 Langkawi Island
