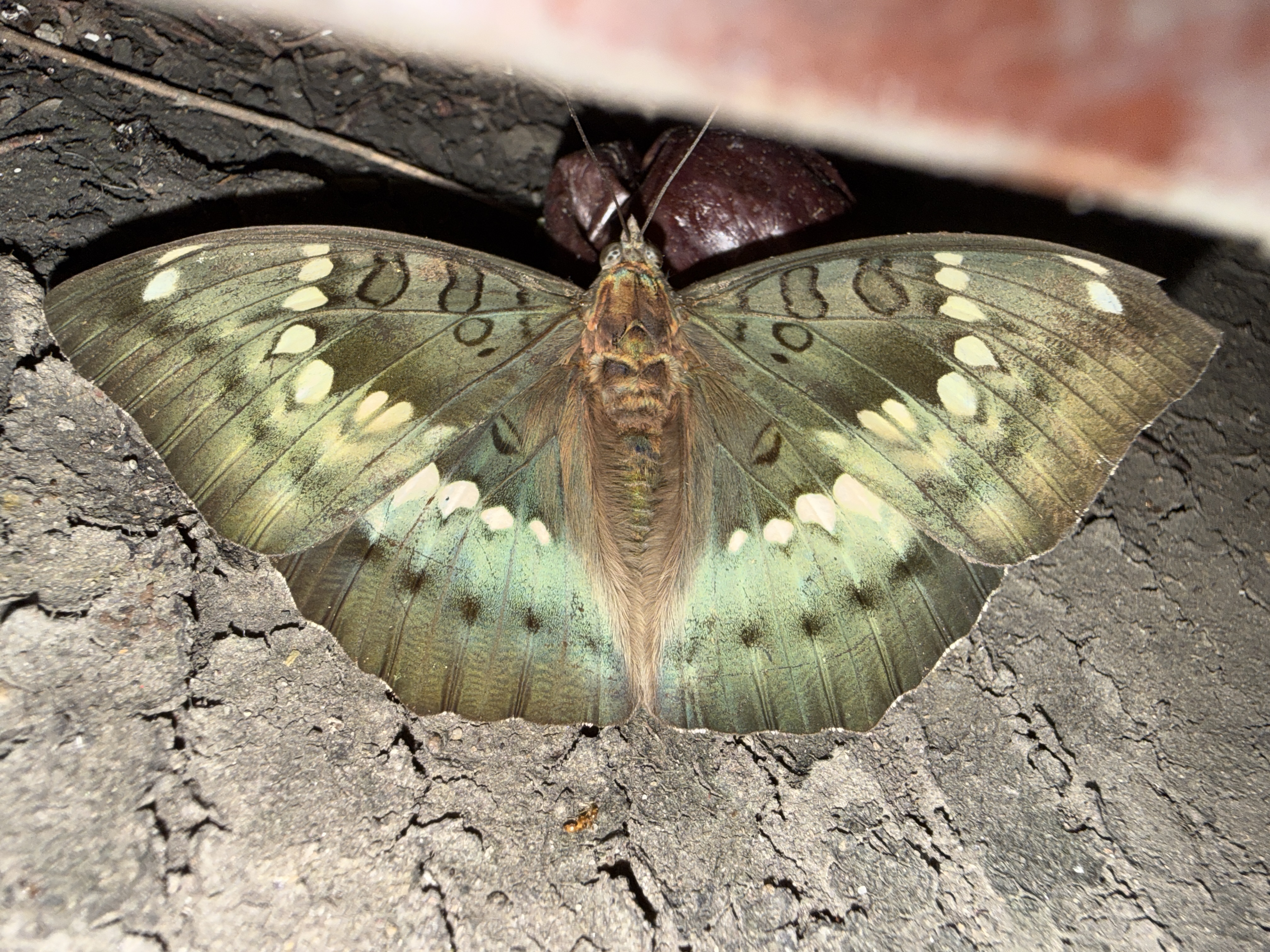
- In Sichuan, China

Scientific classification
- Kingdom: Animalia
- Phylum: Arthropoda
- Clade: Pancrustacea
- Class: Insecta
- Order: Lepidoptera
- Family: Nymphalidae
- Genus: Euthalia
- Species: E. kardama

Binomial name
- Euthalia kardama Moore, 1859

= Euthalia kardama =

Species of butterfly

Euthalia kardama is a butterfly of the family Nymphalidae (Limenitidinae). It is endemic to China. The species was first described by Frederic Moore in 1859.

== Description ==
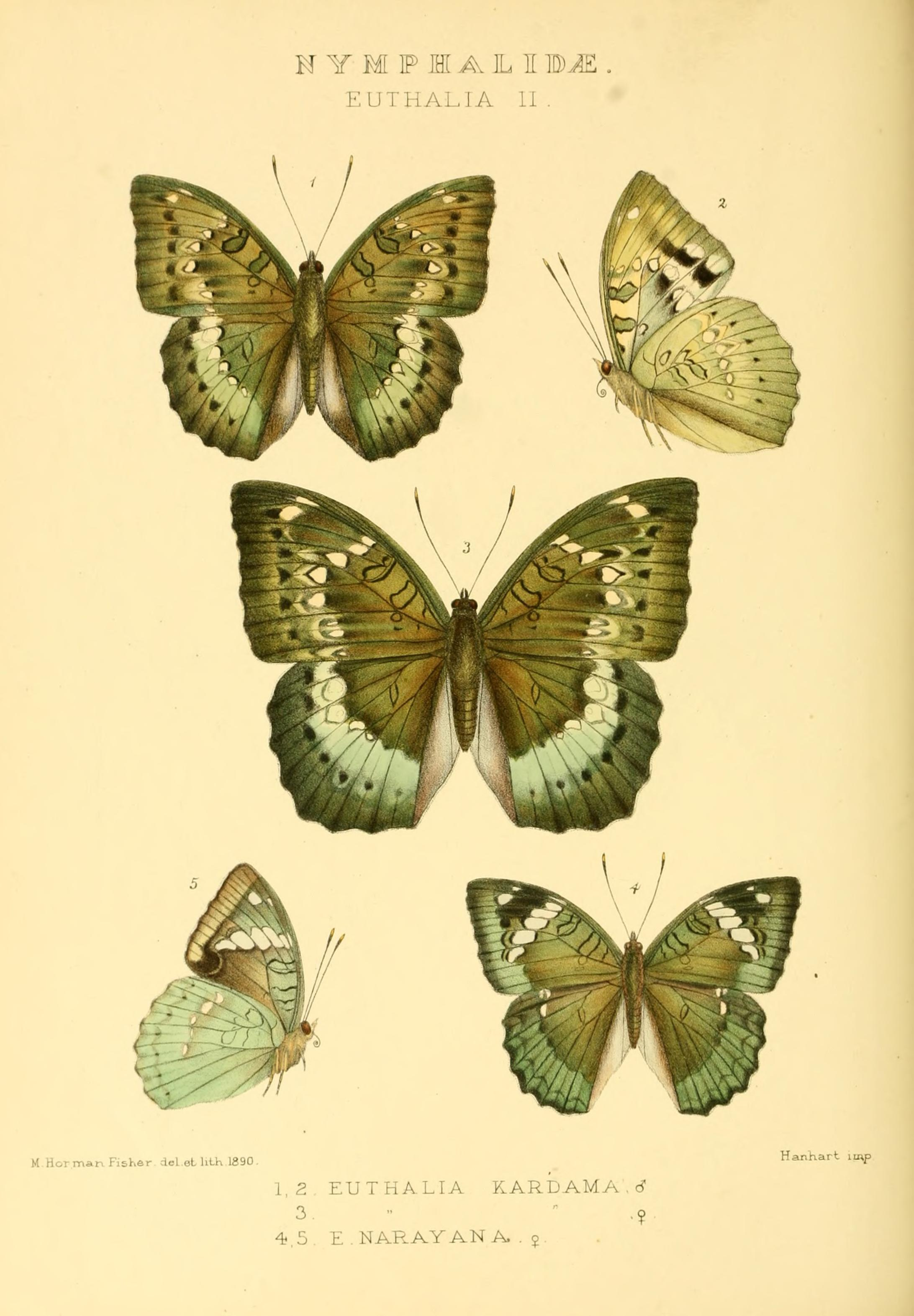
From Rhopalocera Exotica

Original. 40. Adolias Kardama, Moore. (PI. IX. fig. 3.)

Adolias Kardama, n.sp.—Male. Upperside olive-green, brownish along exterior margins: fore-wing with row of eight small yellowish-white spots curving from middle of anterior to middle of posterior margin; also two sub-apical spots ; a sub-marginal row of indistinct blackish spots, the space between this and the curved row patched with yellowish-white, marks at the base of wing black: hind-wing with transverse row of six yellowish-white spots, diminishing in size to a small dot, the three anterior spots confluent, with a broad hemispherical outer border ; an indistinct sub-marginal blackish line. Underside suffused with grey, marked as above. Female. Upperside as in male, but the spots larger, the discal space paler. Underside as in male.

Expanse of male 3.3, female 4 inches.

Hab. China. In the Collection of J. O. Westwood, Esq.

== Gallery ==
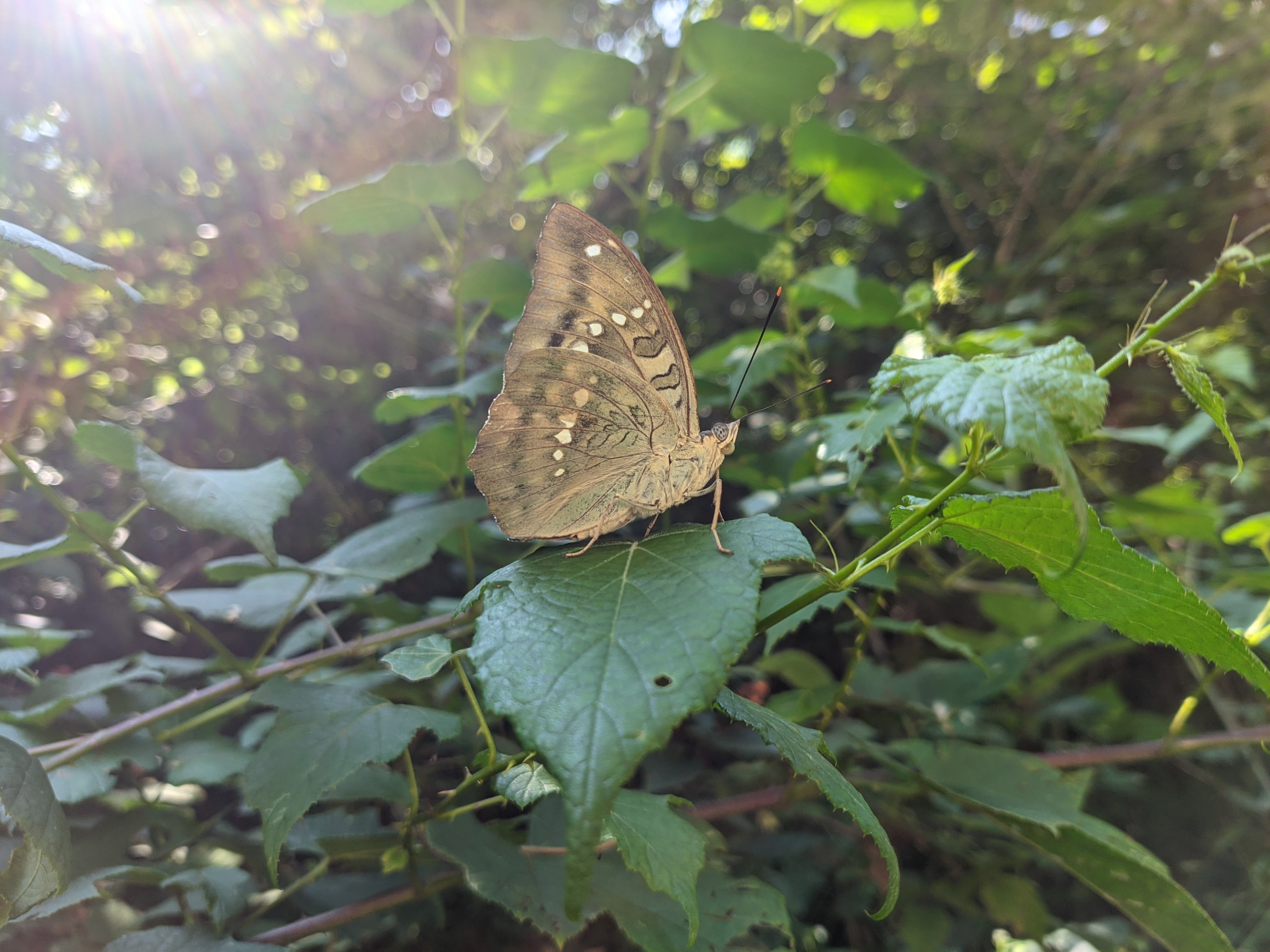

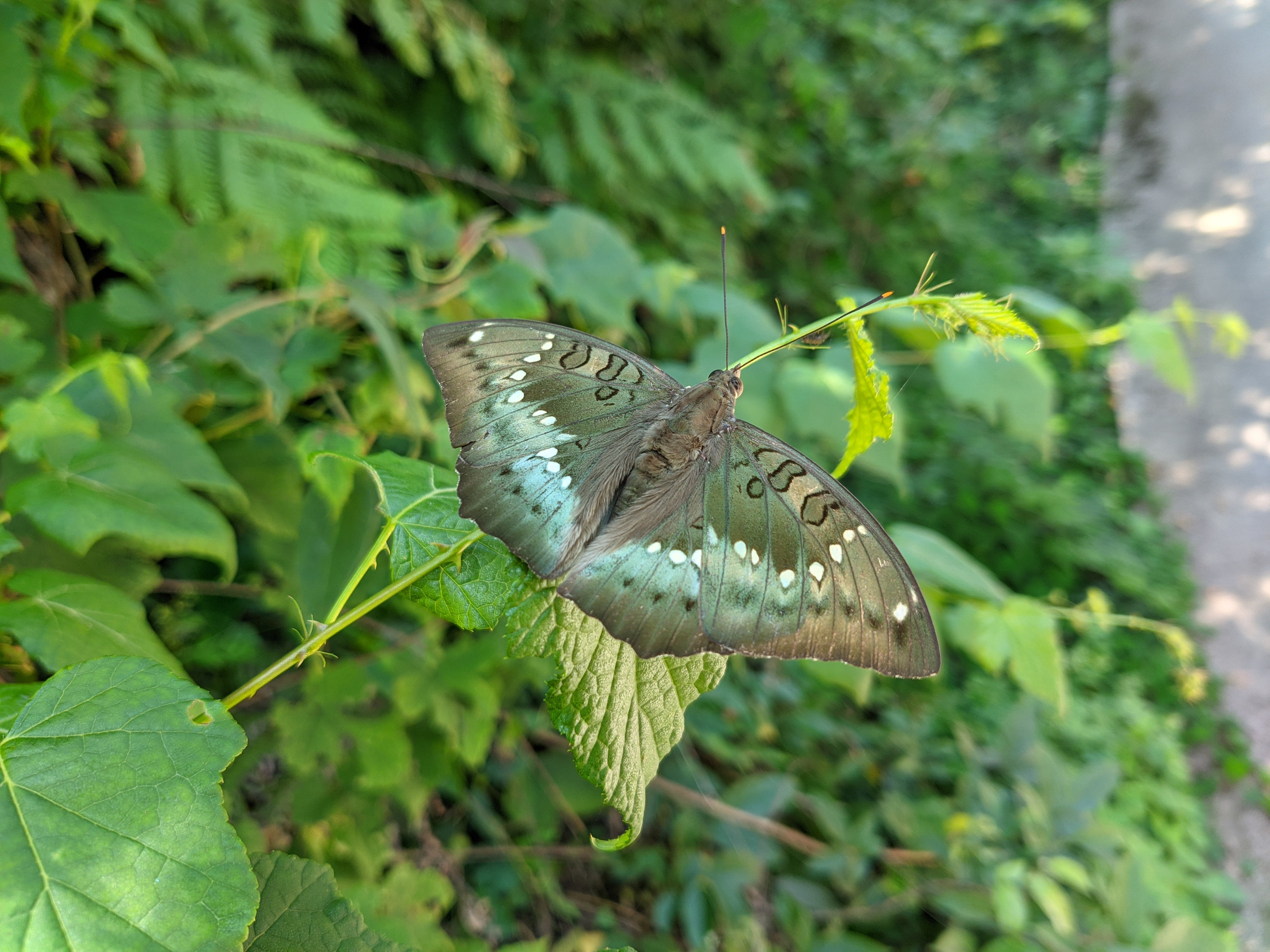
