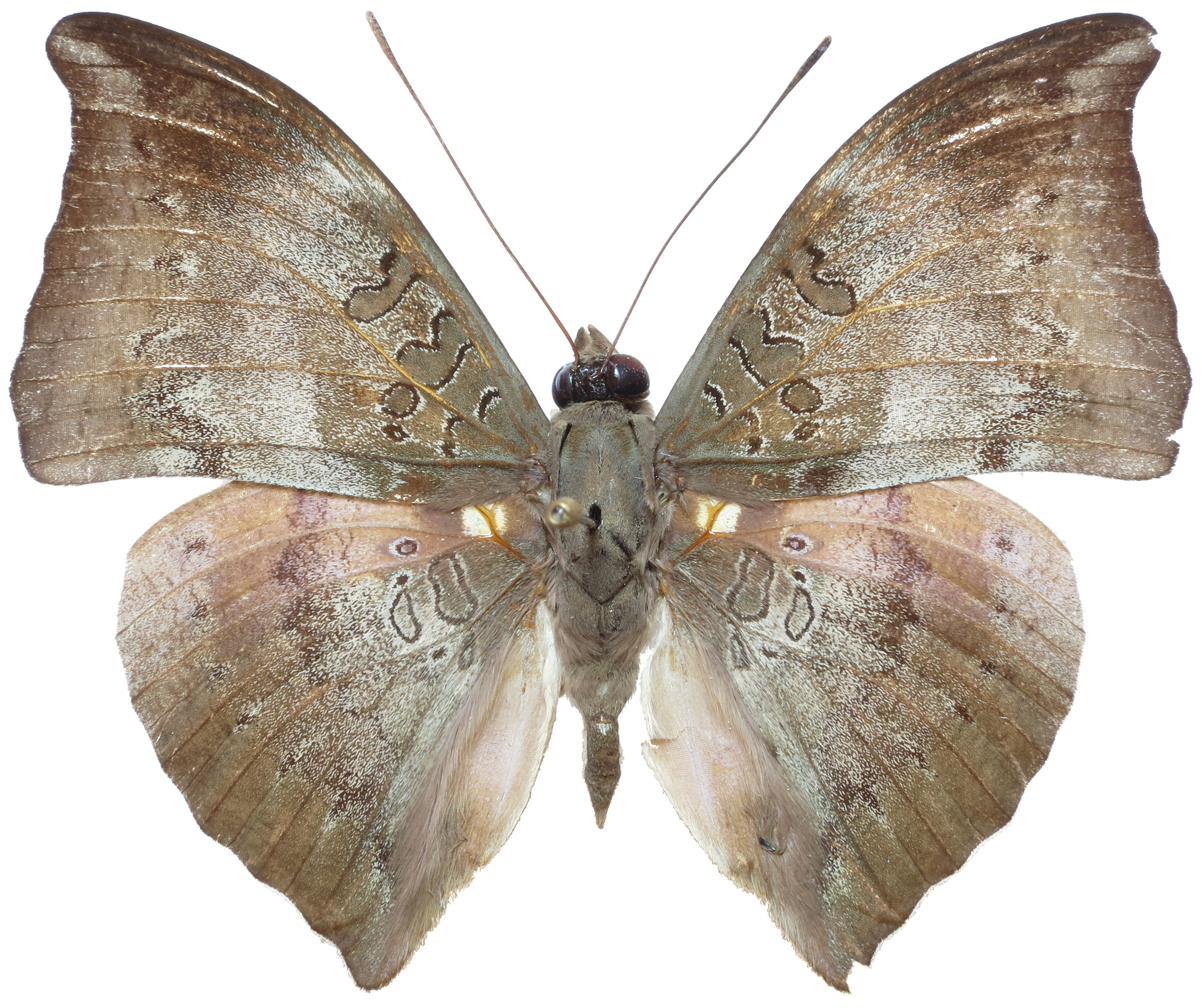
- E. anosia yenadora male - Java
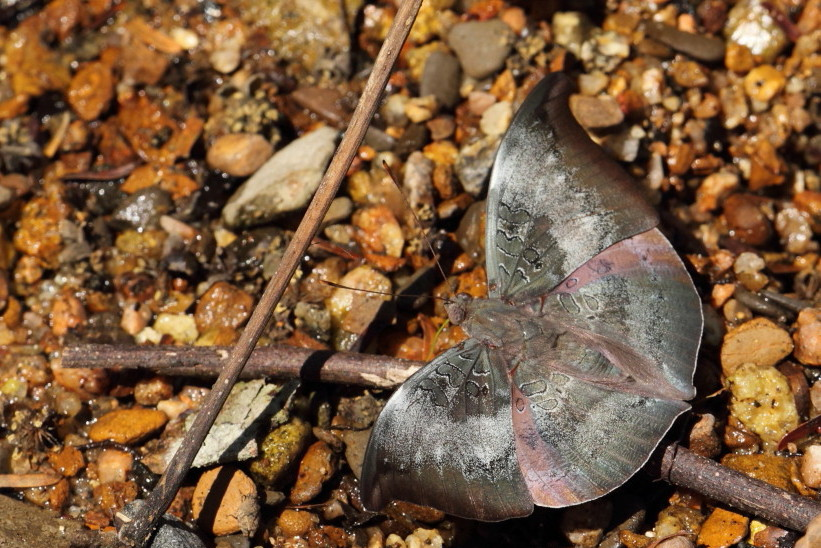
- Euthalia anosia. South Garo Hills, Meghalaya, India

Scientific classification
- Kingdom: Animalia
- Phylum: Arthropoda
- Clade: Pancrustacea
- Class: Insecta
- Order: Lepidoptera
- Family: Nymphalidae
- Genus: Euthalia
- Species: E. anosia

Binomial name
- Euthalia anosia (Moore, 1857)

= Euthalia anosia =

Species of butterfly

Euthalia anosia, the grey baron, is a butterfly of the family Nymphalidae (Limenitidinae). It is found in the Indomalayan realm. It is one of the most easily distinguishable species of Euthalia, on account of the ashy-grey colour of the upper surface which according to the locality is more or less suffused with greenish. Female always larger than the male, forewings with rounded or dentate transcellular spots of clear white. Under surface nearly as above, only somewhat paler, likewise ashy-grey, faintly clouded with brown, the hindwings occasionally with a highly faded greenish irroration.

== Subspecies ==
- E. a. anosia Assam, Burma, Thailand, Yunnan
- E. a. phernes Fruhstorfer, 1913 Sikkim
- E. a. saitaphernes Fruhstorfer, 1913 Sikkim - well differentiated; both sexes are above and beneath paler than anosia, without any brown marmoration. Male without the pale costal patch, but with large white hyaline spot at the inner end of the cell in the forewing. Female with roundish, not pointed, ultracellular spots.
- E. a. yenadora Fruhstorfer, 1913 Java - much smaller than the other subspecies, with paler grey-green colouring, especially of the under surface which displays only faint traces of a brown or greenish irroration. The spots composing the white semi-band of the forewing are mostly rounded distally.
- E. a. bunaya Fruhstorfer, 1913 Peninsular Malaya, Sumatra - the female has the ground-colour pale grey-green, the forewings with sharply pointed transparent spots; under surface paler than in the Borneo form, on the forewing the white dentate spots narrower than in Assam and Borneo females.
- E. a. dodanda Fruhstorfer, 1913 Malaya - male is above either darker grey-green or blue-grey; female has the semi-band at the end of the cell deeply dentate.
- E. a. yapola Fruhstorfer, 1913 Borneo - female above with sharply defined, deep green basal and pale grey-green median markings. The subapical white macular semi¬band is less deeply encroached upon than in bunaya from Perak. Beneath darker even than Assam females, the olive green markings broadly diffuse also on the margin of the hindwings.
- E. a. pagiana Corbet, 1942 Mentawei Island
- E. a. mindanaensis Schröder & Treadaway, 1978 Philippines (Mindanao)
- E. a. yao Yoshino, 1997 Guanxi
