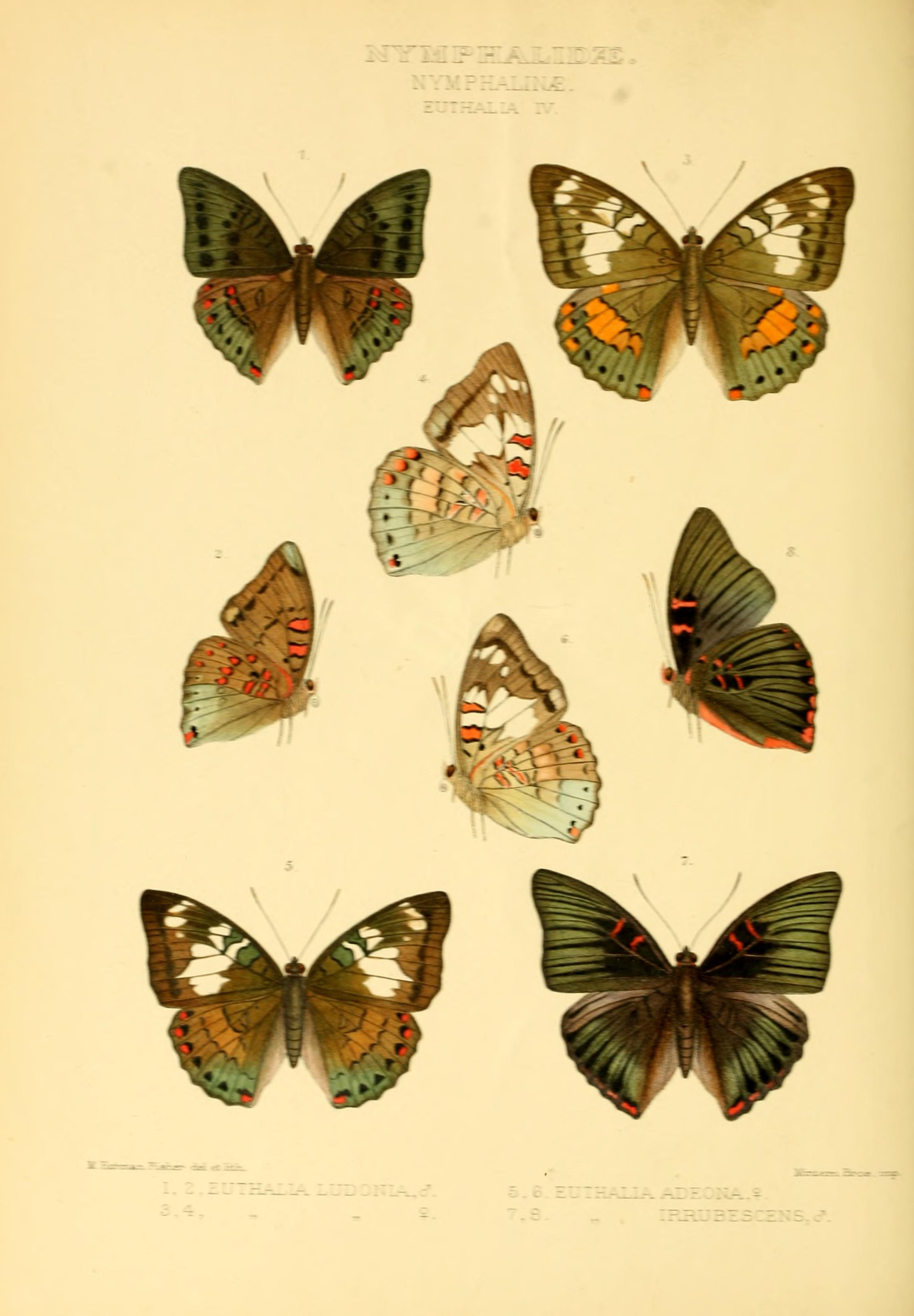
- Euthalia irrubescens in Rhopalocera Exotica
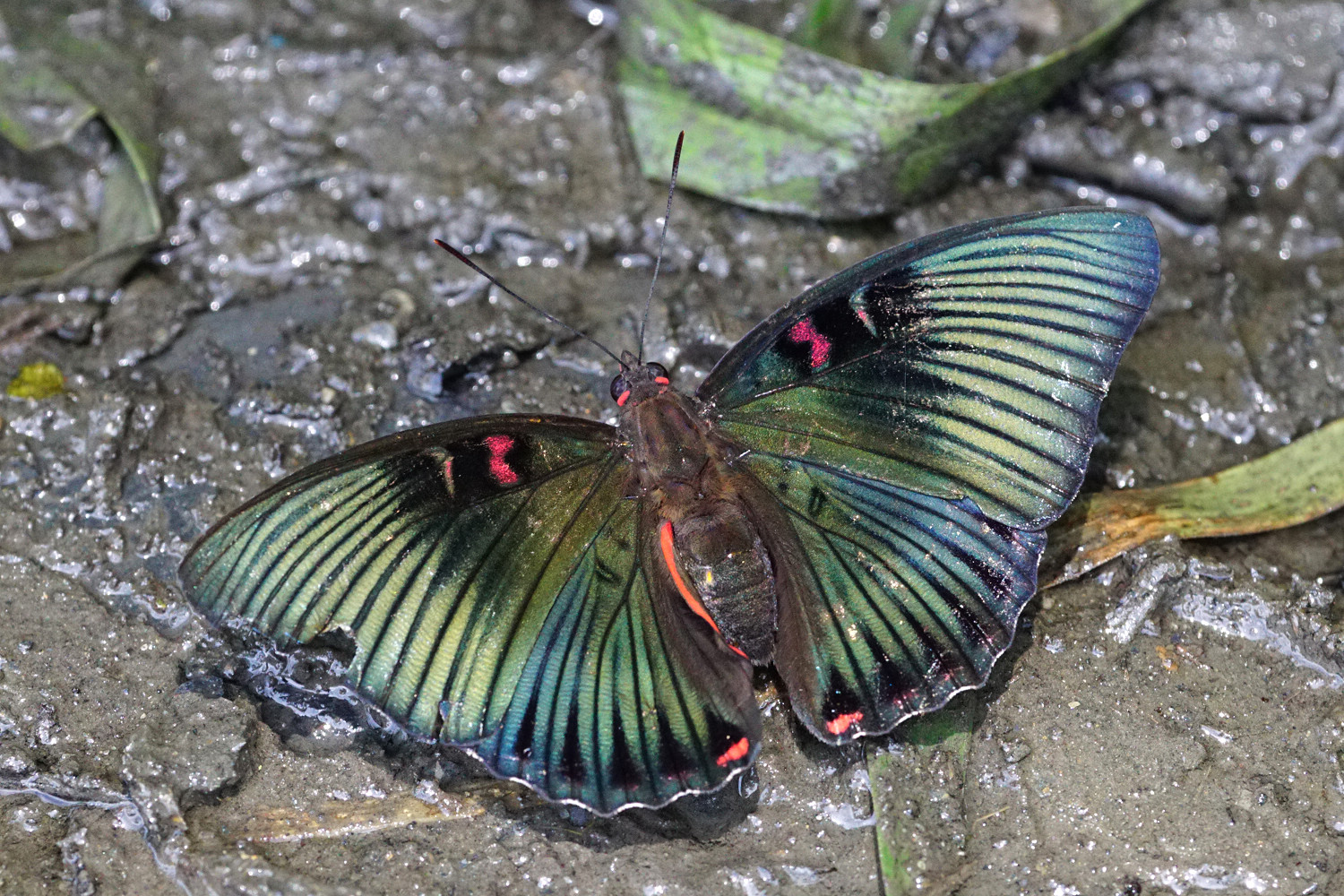

Scientific classification
- Kingdom: Animalia
- Phylum: Arthropoda
- Class: Insecta
- Order: Lepidoptera
- Family: Nymphalidae
- Genus: Euthalia
- Species: E. irrubescens

Binomial name
- Euthalia irrubescens Grose-Smith, 1893

= Euthalia irrubescens =

Species of butterfly

Euthalia irrubescens is a butterfly of the family Nymphalidae (Limenitidinae). It is endemic to China and Taiwan (E. i. fulguralis (Matsumura, 1909)).

== Description ==
Original. Euthalia irrubescens.

Male.— Upperside. Anterior wings with the basal half dark green, almost black, the outer half paler and slightly metallic, the veins, with streaks between them on the paler portion of the wings, being the same colour as the basal half ; the cell is crossed in the middle by an irregular crimson bar, and there is another crimson bar, narrower and somewhat indistinct, at the end of the cell. Posterior wings the same colour as the basal half of the anterior wings, being paler across the disk and traversed by the dark veins with streaks between, as on the outer half of the anterior wings; two dark bars cross the cell, and there is a crimson elongate spot parallel with the outer margin between the submedian nervure and the lowest median nervule; the costal margin is pale and tinged with a bluish shade.

Underside similar to the upperside, but paler. Anterior wings with the crimson bars across and at the end of the cell wider and more distinct, and a small black spot below the median nervure at its junction with the lowest median nervule. Posterior wings with two crimson bars crossing the cell, two crimson spots below the costal nervure and upper median nervule respectively, another crimson spot on the costal margin near the precostal nervure, and another at the base; on the outer margin at the ends of the dark streaks between the veins is a row of crimson spots, those nearest the anal angle the most distinct and those in the middle nearly obsolete ; the inner margin from the base to the anal angle is broadly edged with crimson. Antenne black, the collar and palpi crimson.

Expanse of wings 2.4 inches.

One specimen only.

Allied to E. lubentina, Cramer, var. ludonia, Staudinger, and Whiteheadi, Grose Smith
