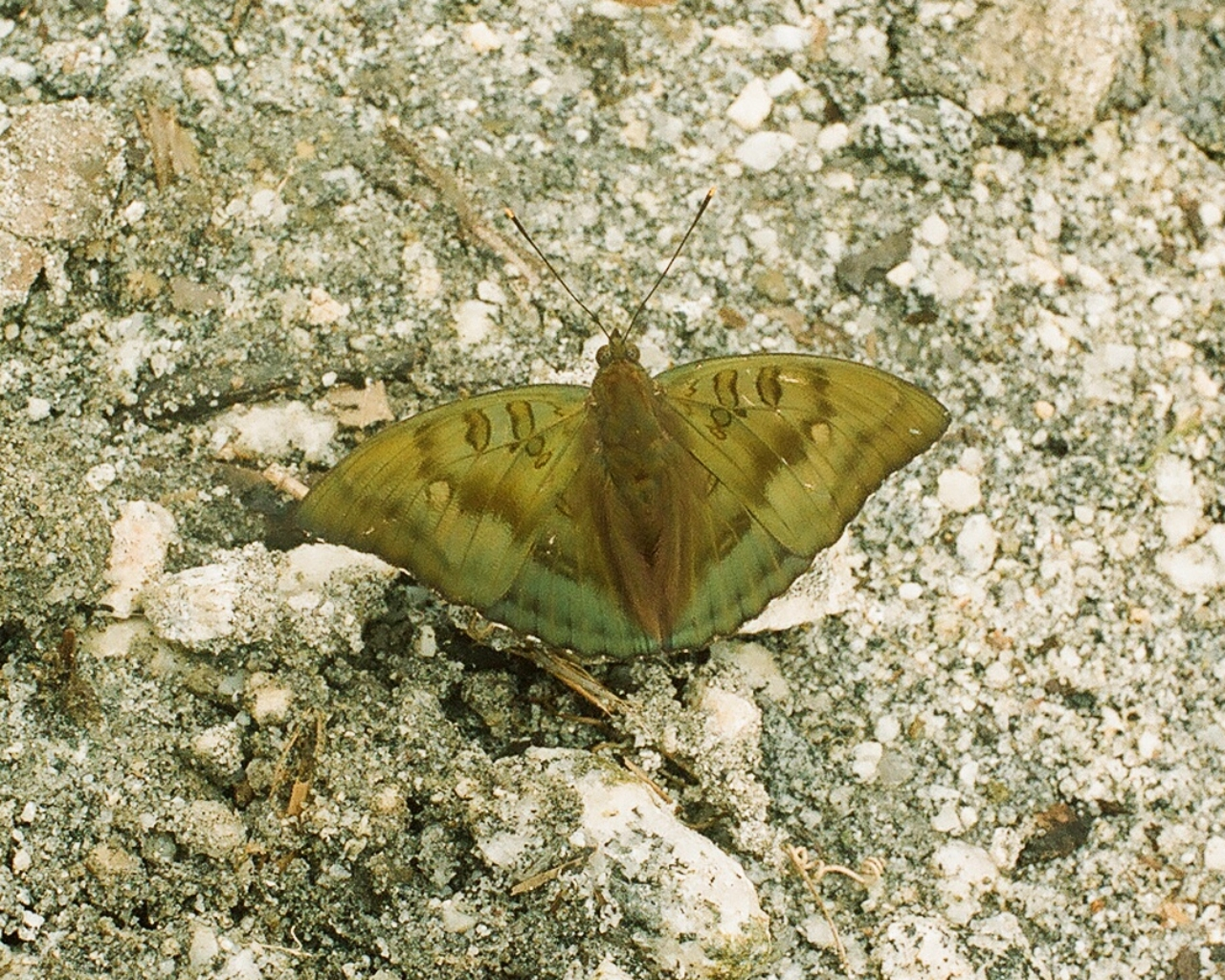
- Euthalia nara Arunachal Pradesh, India

Scientific classification
- Domain: Eukaryota
- Kingdom: Animalia
- Phylum: Arthropoda
- Class: Insecta
- Order: Lepidoptera
- Family: Nymphalidae
- Genus: Euthalia
- Species: E. nara

Binomial name
- Euthalia nara (Moore, 1859)

= Euthalia nara =

Species of butterfly

Euthalia nara, the bronze duke, is a butterfly of the family Nymphalidae (Limenitidinae). It is found in the Indomalayan realm.

== Description ==
Adolias nara n. sp.—Female. Upperside dark glossy golden olive-green, with blackish marginal and sub-marginal lines : forewing with oblique transverse row of six white spots, from middle of costal margin to near posterior angle, also two small sub-apical white spots; marks within discoidal cell black : hind-wing with two white spots on costal margin near the angle. Underside glossy verdigris -green, apically olive-green : fore-wing with markings as above, but more defined and whiter; lower part of disc patched with blue-black : hind-wing with transverse row of six white spots from costal margin to near the posterior angle; indistinct discoidal markings. Ciliae white. Expanse 3 and 5/12inches.In Museum Entomological Society of London.

== Subspecies ==
- E. n. nara India, Sikkim, Nepal, N.Assam; Burma, Yunnan
- E. n. alutoya Fruhstorfer, 1913
- E. n. nagaensis Tytler, 1940 Naga Hils
- E. n. kalawrica Tytler, 1940 Shan States
- E. n. shania Evans, 1924 Shan States, Thailand, Yunnan
- E. n. hainanana Gu, 1994 Hainan
