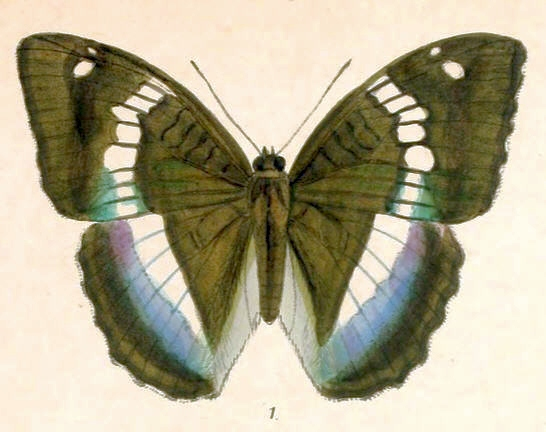

Scientific classification
- Kingdom: Animalia
- Phylum: Arthropoda
- Class: Insecta
- Order: Lepidoptera
- Family: Nymphalidae
- Genus: Euthalia
- Species: E. duda

Binomial name
- Euthalia duda (Staudinger, 1855)

= Euthalia duda =

Blue duchess

Species of butterfly

Euthalia duda, the blue duchess, is a species of nymphalid butterfly found in South Asia.

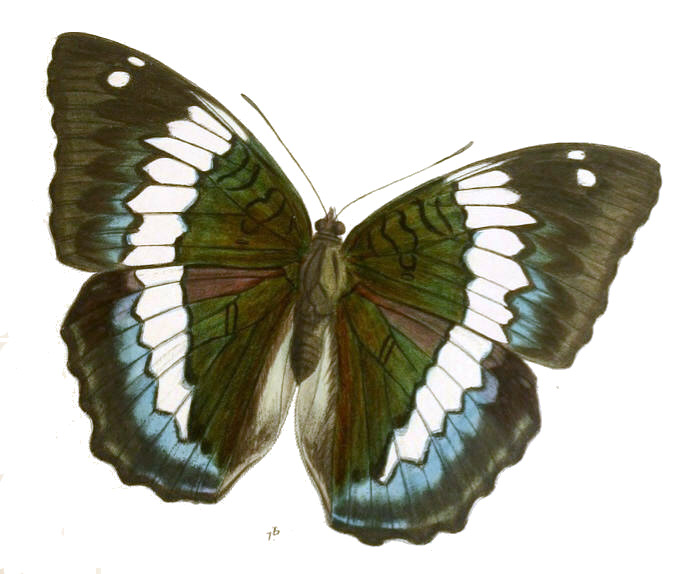

== Description ==
one of the loveliest Euthaliidi. Femalr one third larger than the figured male, and correspondingly more broadly shaded with moss-green in the subanal area of the hindwing. Underneath both sexes are alike, pale green laved with faded blue at the base. White bands as above.

== Subspecies ==
- E. d. duda Sikkim Burma
- E. d. amplifascia Tytler, 1940 Northeast Burma
- E. d. sakota Fruhstorfer, 1913 Yunnan - ground-colour of both sides paler and more uniformly green, without any blue beneath. On the forewing the white band is composed of much smaller, more isolated spots, on the hindwing, however, it is broader, margined with paler blue distally.
- E. d. bellula Yokochi, 2005 Laos, Vietnam
