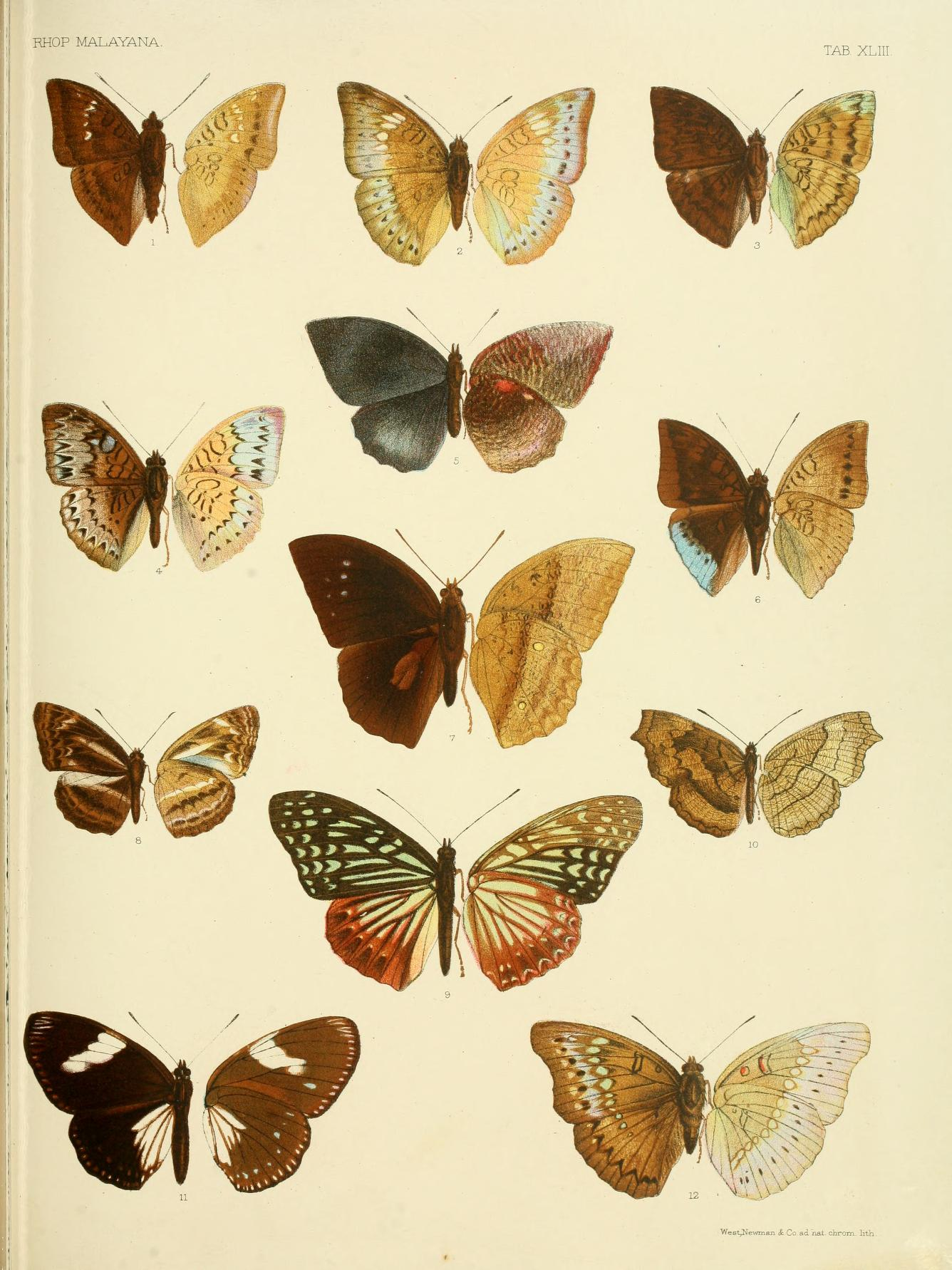
- Euthalia merta in Rhopalocera Malayana (figures1, 2 )

Scientific classification
- Kingdom: Animalia
- Phylum: Arthropoda
- Class: Insecta
- Order: Lepidoptera
- Family: Nymphalidae
- Genus: Euthalia
- Species: E. merta

Binomial name
- Euthalia merta (Moore, 1859)

= Euthalia merta =

Species of butterfly

Euthalia merta, the dark-male baron, is a butterfly of the family Nymphalidae (Limenitidinae). It is found in the Indomalayan realm. It is a large butterfly with forewings with an angular apex and concave outer edge and hindwings with an angular anal angle. The wings are beige to brown, marbled.

== Subspecies ==
- E. m. merta Assam to Peninsular Malaya, Singapore
- E. m. apicalis (Vollenhoven, 1862) Borneo
- E. m. pseudomerta Fruhstorfer, 1906 Sumatra
- E. m. prisca Fruhstorfer, 1913 Bangka
- E. m. phantasma Fruhstorfer, 1913 Nias
- E. m. pseuderiphyle Fruhstorfer, 1913
- E. m. karina Kalis, 1933 Sabang
- E. m. milleri Pendlebury, 1939 Langkawi Is.
- E. m. tioma Eliot, 1978 Pulau Tioman
- E. m. schoenigi Schröder & Treadaway, 1978 Philippines (Negros)
