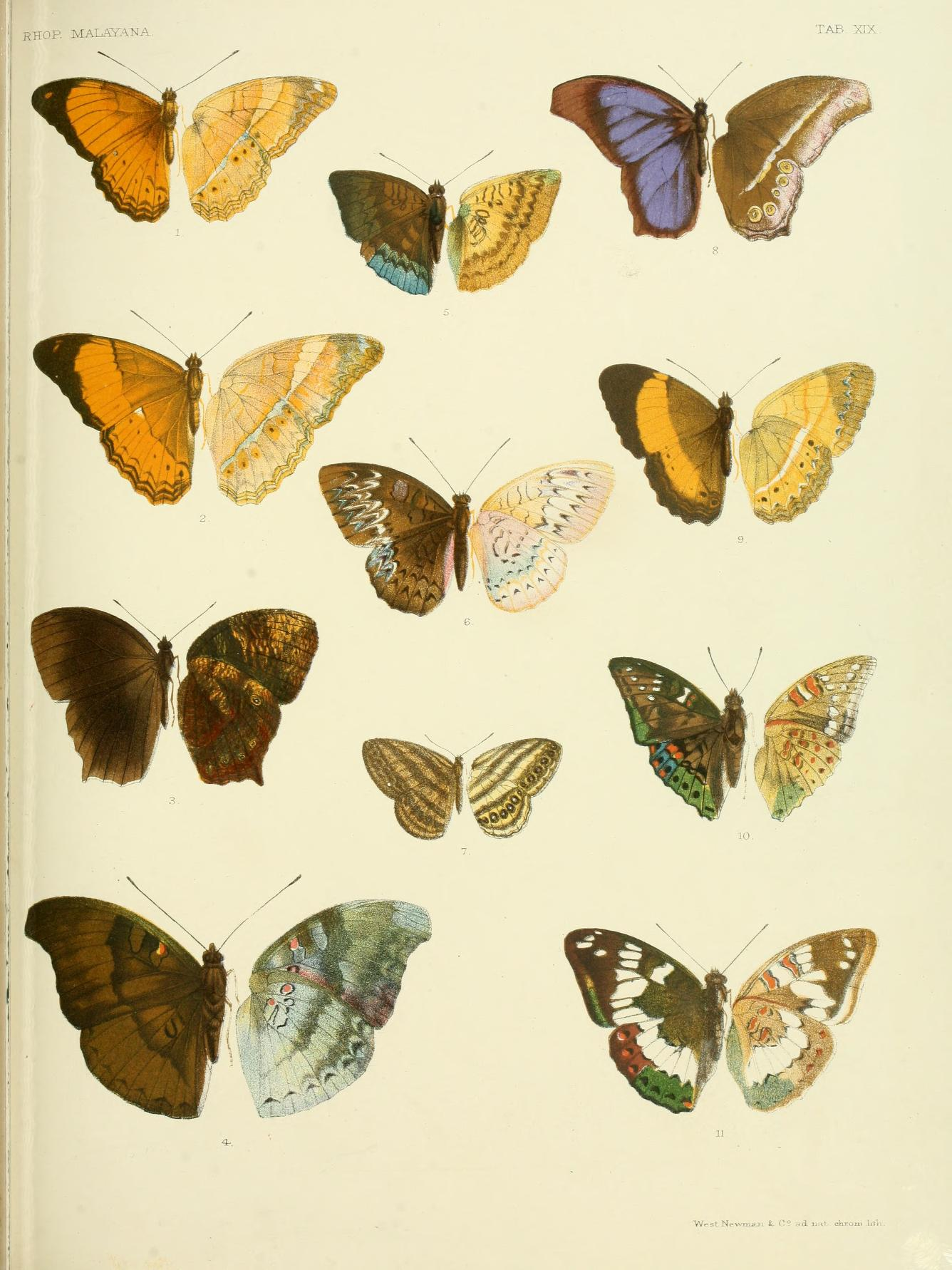
- in Rhopalocera Malayana (figures10,11)

Scientific classification
- Kingdom: Animalia
- Phylum: Arthropoda
- Class: Insecta
- Order: Lepidoptera
- Family: Nymphalidae
- Genus: Euthalia
- Species: E. adonia

Binomial name
- Euthalia adonia (Cramer, [1780])

= Euthalia adonia =

Species of butterfly

Euthalia adonia is a butterfly of the family Nymphalidae (Limenitidinae). It is found in the Indomalayan realm.

== Description ==
E. adonia is, in contradistinction to lubentina, a chiefly insular species, occurring on the continent only in Farther India, and reaching the Smaller Sunda Islands. The male differs from lubentina in having on the forewing the white submarginal dots smaller and placed vertically above one another; the upper surface lacks the red cellular spots. Males can be recognized by the vertical, band-shaped white median area of the forewing, generally extending also to the hindwing where it varies according to the locality. Also the males have as a rule the red median spots on the forewings nearly twice as large than in lubentina, but this does not hold good on the smaller islands. The sexual organs closely resemble those of lubentina, the uncus being somewhat longer and more robust, the valve with two distinct distal teeth which are absent in lubentina-, ventrally not distended. As also in the preceding species of the lubentina group, the third subcostal branch arises in both sexes at an equal distance beyond the cell in the forewing, differing therein from the other Euthaliidi. The earlier stages are not known. The imago is said to visit fallen fruit, but I never succeeded in taking it on suspended bananas. They prefer the low-lands, and are even rarer than E. lubentina. adonia Cr. (129 e) was originally described and figured from a female taken at Samsrang on the North-East Coast of Java; our figures represent specimens from near Sukabumi in Western Java.Females from the surroundings of Malang in the Eastern part of the island have on the forewing the white bands and transcellular spots rather broader. Very scarce. Occurring from the coast to an altitude of about 2000 ft. Images Insecta pro Images University Singapore

== Subspecies ==
- E. a. adonia Java, Bali
- E. a. sapitana Fruhstorfer, 1899 Lombok sapitana Fruhst. which goes among all the forms farthest East, has the white bands reduced, although in a lesser degree than in pura.
- E. a. princesa Fruhstorfer, 1899 Philippines (Palawan)
- E. a. montana Fruhstorfer, 1899 Borneo
- E. a. pura Fruhstorfer, 1904 Bawean - a good example of the modifications produced on the small satellite islands; for notwithstanding the many obvious differences it is nothing more or less than a melanotic insular form of the well known adonia Cr. of Java, having all the white markings of the forewings greatly reduced and obscured, and the red spots on the upper surface of the hindwings much smaller and more rounded. Also the under surface has all the white and red markings greatly reduced, being dark green, not brownish, and the black submarginal dots are more prominent than in adonia. The reduction of the white spots is even more surprising, because the long white streaks on the 3rd median nervule and anal margin of the forewing have nearly disappeared. The white spots of the hindwings are barely half as wide as in Java females, but the black submarginal dots are both above and beneath at least twice as large. The anal angle of the hindwing lacks beneath the broad blue irroration distinguishing adonia. pura stands about midway between this and sapitana Fruhst. from Lombok, but is somewhat darker than the latter which has the white bands broader. Island of Bawean; flies from July till September.
- E. a. sumatrana Fruhstorfer, 1904 Sumatra -sumatrana Fruhst. is considered to be an extraordinary rarity, Dr. Hagen and Martin capturing within nearly 15 years only 3 resp. 2 specimens. According to Hagen, Sumatra females are of a less brilliant colouring than those from near Sukabumi. One male of my [Fruhstorfer] collection has the white spots of the forewing smaller than adonia male; the female the red markings of the hindwing considerably reduced. On the other hand the latter has on the forewing the white subapical spots much larger. Under surface darker than in adonia, somewhat paler than in pura
- E. a. beata Fruhstorfer, 1905.Thailand, Langkawi Island
- E. a. baliensis Jurriaanse & Volbeda, 1924 Bali
- E. a. pinwilli Pendlebury & Corbet, 1938 Peninsular Malaya, Singapore
- E. a. kangeana Talbot, 1943 Kangean Island
