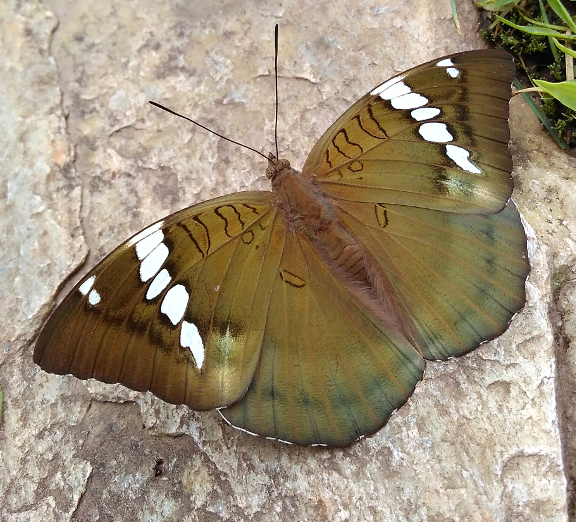
- Euthalia patala Uttarakhand, India

Scientific classification
- Kingdom: Animalia
- Phylum: Arthropoda
- Clade: Pancrustacea
- Class: Insecta
- Order: Lepidoptera
- Family: Nymphalidae
- Genus: Euthalia
- Species: E. patala

Binomial name
- Euthalia patala Kollar, [1844]

= Euthalia patala =

Species of butterfly

Euthalia patala, the grand duchess, is a butterfly of the family Nymphalidae (Limenitidinae). It is found in the Indomalayan realm.

== Description ==
Wings olive-green with black in the costal nervure; the forewings with a spotted white band across the middle, from the middle of the anterior margin towards the posterior angle, and two white spots near the summit; the hinder wings with three spots in the centre of the anterior margin.Under surface like the upper, but of a cinereous colour.Expanse of wings four inches.

== Subspecies ==
- E. p. patala North India, Nepal, Assam
- E. p. taooana (Moore, 1878) Burma, Thailand, China
- E. p. lengba (Tytler, 1940) Maniur
