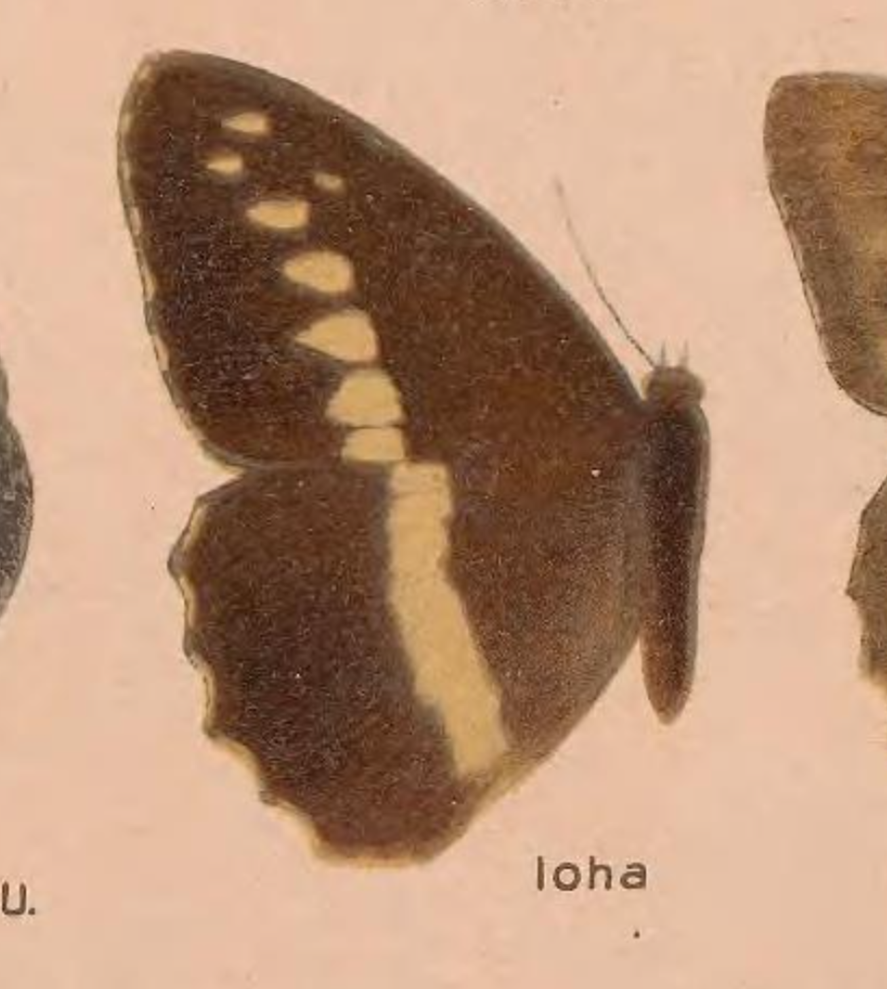

Scientific classification
- Kingdom: Animalia
- Phylum: Arthropoda
- Clade: Pancrustacea
- Class: Insecta
- Order: Lepidoptera
- Family: Nymphalidae
- Genus: Aulocera
- Species: A. loha

Binomial name
- Aulocera loha Doherty, 1886

= Aulocera loha =

Species of butterfly

Aulocera loha, also known as the eyeless satyr or the Doherty's satyr, is a butterfly in the family Hesperiidae. It is found from Uttarakhand in India to Tibet in China.

== Description ==
This species is very similar to Aulocera padma, but it has a white spot in the inner edge of the black subapical spot on the upperside forewing. It differs from Aulocera chumbica from the much broader longitudinal bands. The hindwing band is sttght and yellowish on the underside. The underside is also darker in loha.

== Subspecies ==
There are four subspecies-

- Aulocera loha loha - Uttarakhand
- Aulocera loha japroa - North-east India
- Aulocera loha chinensis - Yunnan
- Aulocera loha zheduoshanensis - Sichuan
