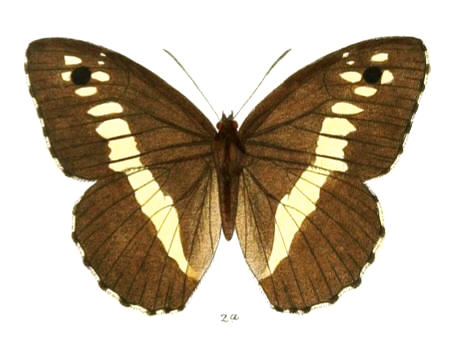

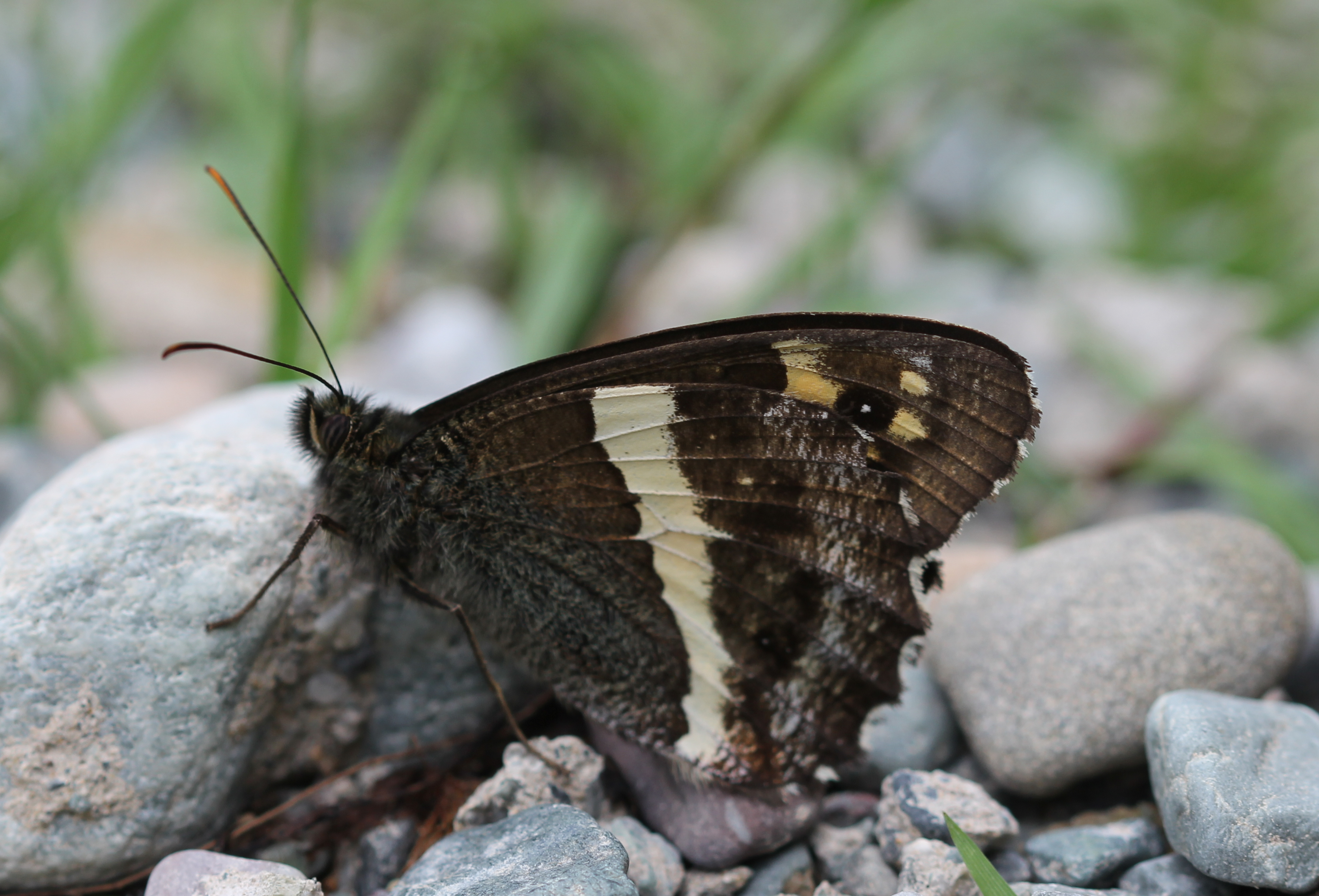

Scientific classification
- Kingdom: Animalia
- Phylum: Arthropoda
- Class: Insecta
- Order: Lepidoptera
- Family: Nymphalidae
- Genus: Aulocera
- Species: A. swaha

Binomial name
- Aulocera swaha Kollar, 1844

= Aulocera swaha =

Common satyr

Species of butterfly

Aulocera swaha, the common satyr, is a brown (Satyrinae) butterfly that is found in the Himalayas.

== Range ==
The butterfly is found in the Himalayas in Afghanistan, and from Safed Koh, Astor, Chilas, Gilgit, Chitral, Kashmir and Kulu eastwards across to Sikkim.

== Status ==
In 1932, William Harry Evans reported that the species was common from Chitral to Sikkim, and not rare westwards.

== Description ==
The common satyr is 60 to 70 mm in wingspan. Dark brown above, basically ground colour with a bronze sheen. With a white band across both wings. The band varies from white to bright yellow and narrows towards the dorsum on the hindwing which it never reaches (except rarely in the females). It has a chequered fringe and a dark apical spot or ocellus on the forewing. The under hindwing is beautifully variegated with brown, white and grey. The colour below is paler than that of the great satyr (Aulocera padma) which is a larger and more common butterfly.

== See also ==
- Satyrinae
- Nymphalidae
- List of butterflies of India (Satyrinae)
