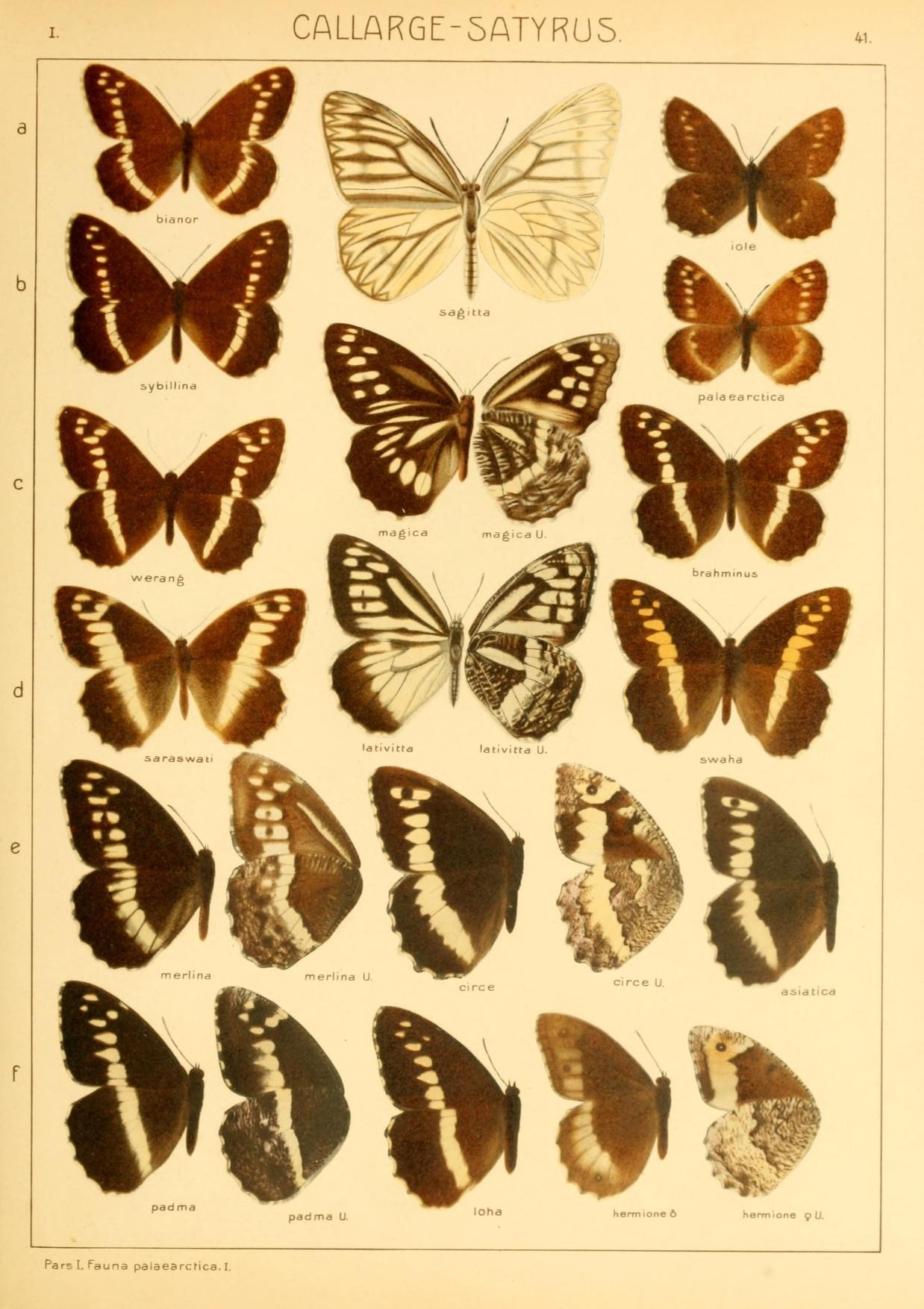
- Aulocera sybillina in Seitz (41b)

Scientific classification
- Kingdom: Animalia
- Phylum: Arthropoda
- Class: Insecta
- Order: Lepidoptera
- Family: Nymphalidae
- Genus: Aulocera
- Species: A. sybillina

Binomial name
- Aulocera sybillina Oberthür, 1890

= Aulocera sybillina =

Species of butterfly

Aulocera sybillina is a butterfly found in the Palearctic that belongs to the browns family (Nymphalidae). The species was first described by Charles Oberthür in 1890. It is endemic to China and Tibet.

== Description from Seitz ==
S. sybillina Oberth. (41b). Recalling the occidental circe but much smaller, and the white band quite narrow and on the forewing separated into spots. On the underside the band is twice as wide as above and contrasts strongly with the somewhat marmorated (marble-like) black ground. In western China, in June and July, locally abundant.

== Biology ==
The larva feeds on Gramineae.
