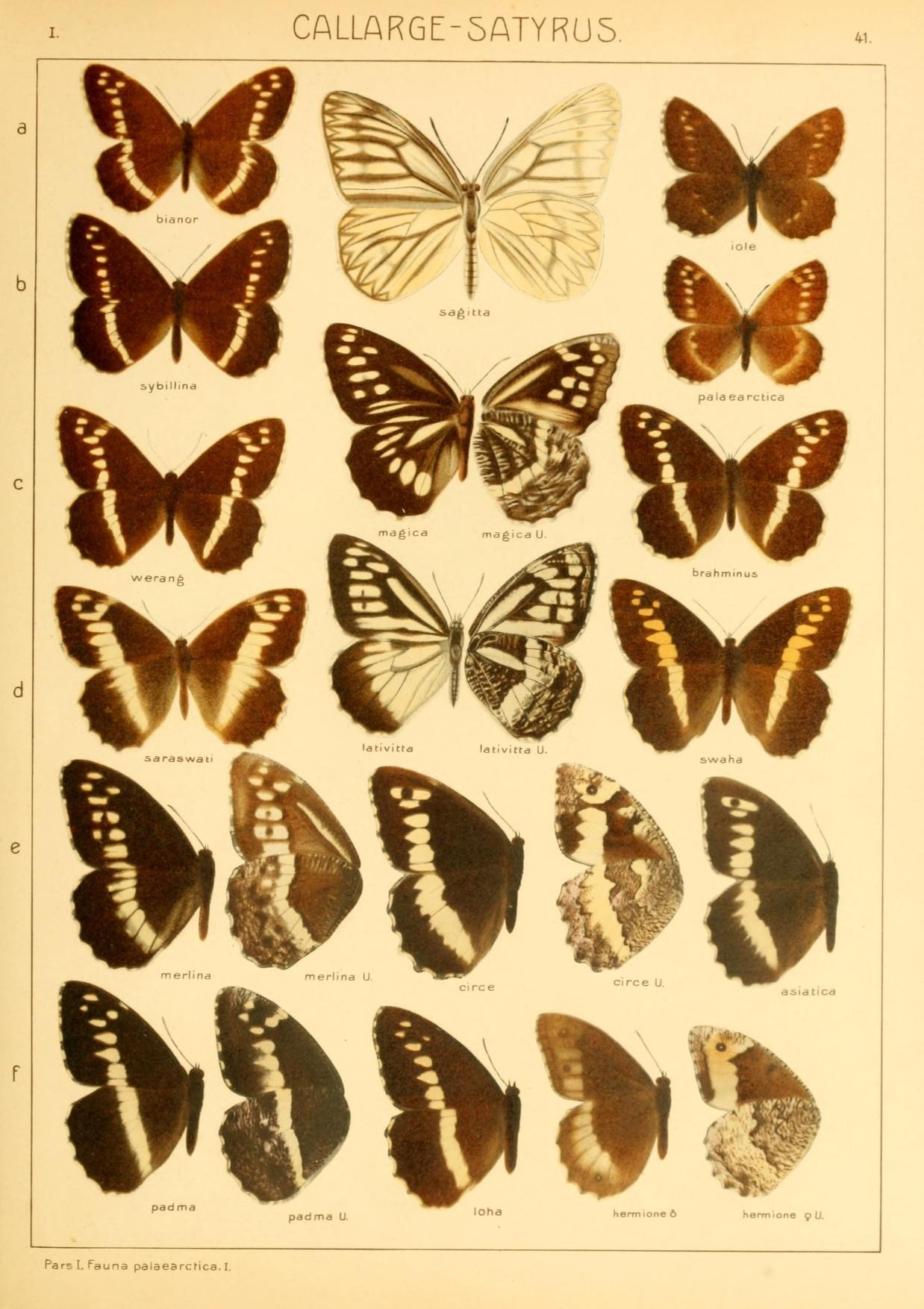
- Aulocera magica in Seitz (41c)

Scientific classification
- Kingdom: Animalia
- Phylum: Arthropoda
- Class: Insecta
- Order: Lepidoptera
- Family: Nymphalidae
- Genus: Aulocera
- Species: A. magica

Binomial name
- Aulocera magica (Oberthür, 1886)

= Aulocera magica =

Species of butterfly

Aulocera magica is a butterfly found in the East Palearctic that belongs to the browns family (Nymphalidae). It is endemic to western China and Tibet. The species was first described by Charles Oberthur in 1886.

== Description from Seitz ==
S. magica Oberth. (41 c). Similar to the preceding Aulocera merlina, but there is a white longitudinal stripe in the cell of both wings on the underside. In the nymotypical form only the cell-stripe of the hindwing appears also above, while ab. lativitta Leech (41c) has a white cell-stripe also on the upperside of the forewing, the upperside of the hindwing being quite white, except the broad black distal margin. — In western China (at Wa-shan and Ta-tsien-lu) and in Tibet, rare, in June and July.
