= Aulocera brahminoides =

Scientific classification
- Kingdom: Animalia
- Phylum: Arthropoda
- Class: Insecta
- Order: Lepidoptera
- Family: Nymphalidae
- Genus: Aulocera
- Species: A. brahminoides

Binomial name
- Aulocera brahminoides Moore, 1896

Species of butterfly

Aulocera brahminoides is a brown (Satyrinae) butterfly that is found in the Himalayas.

== Range ==
The butterfly is found in the Himalayas including Sikkim, the Chumbi Valley and Tibet.

== Status ==
In 1932 William Harry Evans reported that the species was rare in the Chumbi Valley.

== Description ==
Earlier Aulocera brahminoides was considered a subspecies of A. brahminus.

Aulocera brahminoides is 50 to 60 mm in wingspan and its smaller than A. brahminus.

The narrow-banded satyrs are large, powerfully built Himalayan butterflies which are black or very dark brown above. They are characterised by a white discal band across both wings. The hindwing band is narrow and even in width. The white discal spots in 1 to 4 along the inner edge of the forewing are in line. The wings are rounded with convex termens and have chequered fringes. A dark apical spot or ocellus is present on the forewing. The under hindwing is dark below, with beautiful white variegations not as prominent as the dark background.

The tegumen is gradually sloped to the tip.

In A. brahminus, the under-forewing apical ocellus is well-defined and prominently pupilled while in A. brahminoides it is less well defined, much smaller and darker. The upper-hindwing discal band to dorsum, which is a characteristic feature in A. brahminus is much curved in the case of A. brahminoides.

== See also ==
- Satyrinae
- Nymphalidae
- List of butterflies of India (Satyrinae)
