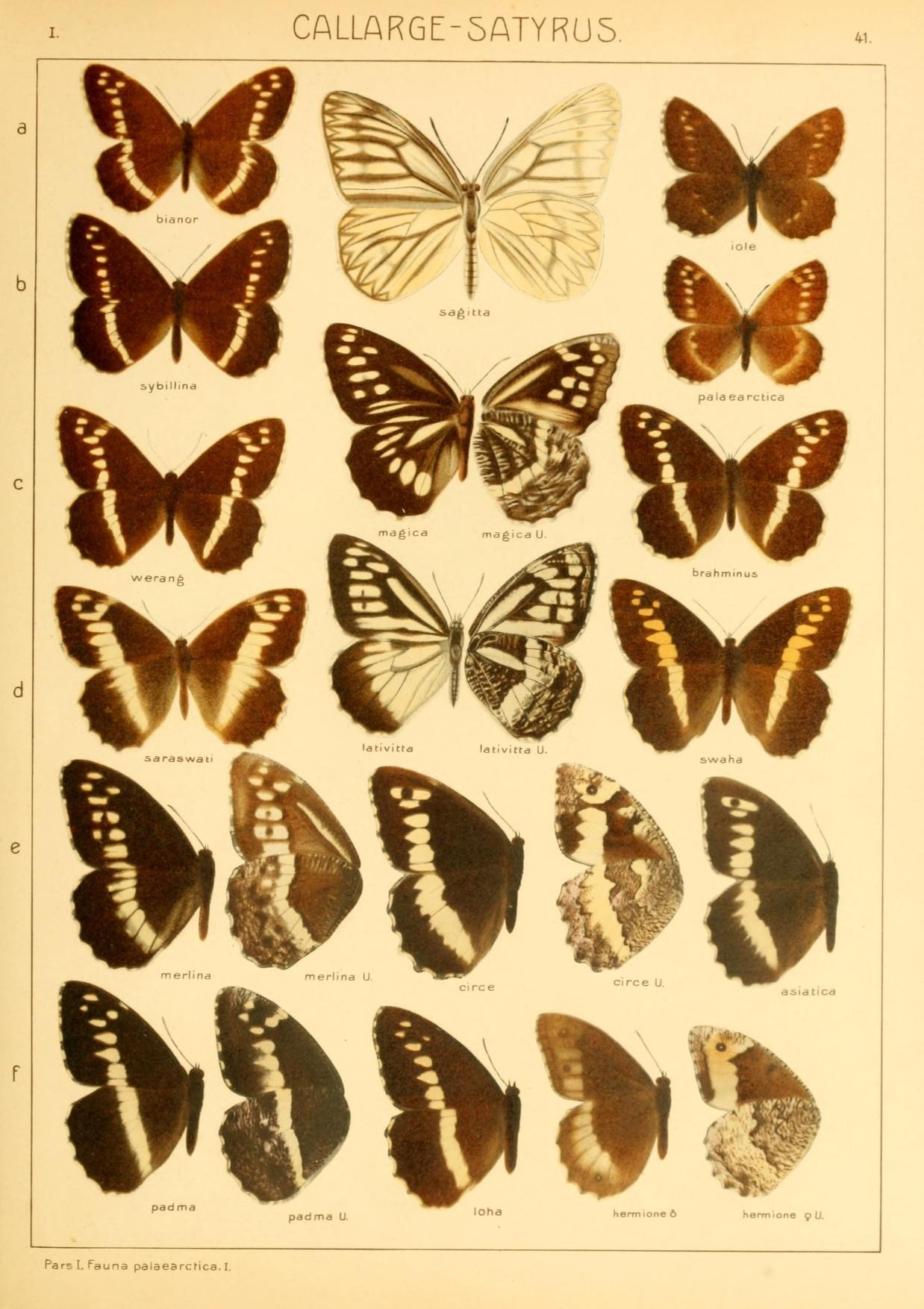
- Aulocera merlina in Seitz (41e)

Scientific classification
- Kingdom: Animalia
- Phylum: Arthropoda
- Class: Insecta
- Order: Lepidoptera
- Family: Nymphalidae
- Genus: Aulocera
- Species: A. merlina

Binomial name
- Aulocera merlina Oberthür, 1890

= Aulocera merlina =

Species of butterfly

Aulocera merlina is a butterfly found in the east Palearctic that belongs to the browns family (Nymphalidae). The species was first described by Charles Oberthür in 1890. It is endemic to Sichuan and Yunnan provinces in China. Subspecies A. m. pulcheristriata Huang, 2001 is described from Tibet (type locality between Quzhu and Genong, Nujiang Valley, Tibet).

== Description from Seitz ==
S. merlina Oberth. (41 e). In size, facies and colour similar to circe, but on the forewing the portion of the white band which lies below the apical ocellus is divided by the interposition of black spots, and the cell of the forewing beneath bears a white longitudinal stripe. In western China, widely distributed, and not rare, from June till August.

== Biology ==
The larva feeds on Gramineae.
