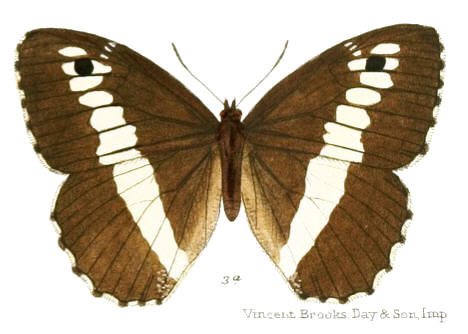
- Aulocera saraswati

Scientific classification
- Kingdom: Animalia
- Phylum: Arthropoda
- Class: Insecta
- Order: Lepidoptera
- Family: Nymphalidae
- Subfamily: Satyrinae
- Tribe: Satyrini
- Subtribe: Satyrina
- Genus: Aulocera; Butler, 1867

Species
- See text

= Aulocera =

Genus of butterflies

Aulocera is a genus in the subfamily Satyrinae (or brown butterflies) of the brush-footed butterfly family, Nymphalidae. Commonly referred to as banded satyrs, species of the genus Aulocera are endemic to the Himalayas and associated mountain ranges.

== Taxonomy ==
Aulocera is considered to be a valid genus by some authorities and a junior subjective synonym of the basal genus Satyrus by others.

== List of species ==
- Aulocera brahminus (Blanchard, 1853)
- Aulocera brahminoides (Moore, 1901)
- Aulocera loha (Doherty, 1886)
- Aulocera magica Oberthür, 1886
- Aulocera merlina Oberthür, 1890
- Aulocera padma (Kollar, 1844)
- Aulocera swaha (Kollar, 1844)
- Aulocera saraswati (Kollar, 1844)
- Aulocera sybillina Oberthür, 1890

== General description ==
Banded satyrs are large powerfully built Himalayan butterflies which are dark brown above. They are characterised by a white band across both wings. The wings have chequered fringes. A dark apical spot or ocellus is present on the forewing. The under hindwing is dark. The under hindwing is beautifully variegated with brown, white and grey.

Males have an obscure brand on the forewing.

== Habits ==
Banded satyrs inhabit the Himalayas from moderate to considerable high altitudes. Fond of open country, they can found elsewhere especially on rocks and paths. Banded satyrs are very fond of sunshine.

Their flight is both graceful and fast ... they settle often, occasionally on flowers ... possibly the finest of all Indian Satyrids.

— Mark Alexander Wynter-Blyth, Butterflies of the Indian Region (1957)

== See also ==
- Satyrinae
- Nymphalidae
- List of butterflies of India (Satyrinae)
