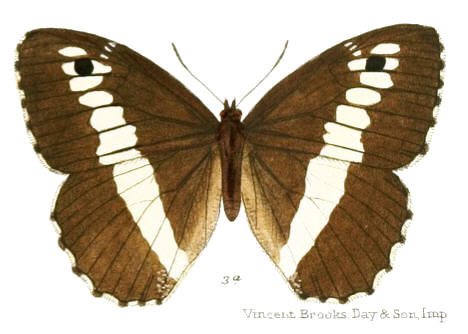

Scientific classification
- Kingdom: Animalia
- Phylum: Arthropoda
- Clade: Pancrustacea
- Class: Insecta
- Order: Lepidoptera
- Family: Nymphalidae
- Genus: Aulocera
- Species: A. saraswati

Binomial name
- Aulocera saraswati Kollar, 1844

= Aulocera saraswati =

Striated satyr

Species of butterfly

Aulocera saraswati, the striated satyr, is a brown (Satyrinae) butterfly that is found in the Himalayas.

== Range ==
The butterfly is found in the Himalayas from Chitral eastwards across to Sikkim.

== Status ==
In 1932, William Harry Evans reported that the species was common.

== Description ==
The striated satyr is 65 to 75 mm in wingspan.

It is a large powerfully built butterfly which is dark brown above and characterised by a white band across both wings. The white band is broad and straight on the hindwing and reaches the dorsum. The wings have chequered fringes. A dark apical spot or ocellus is present on the forewing. The under hindwing is pale with prominent white striations. The under hindwing is beautifully variegated with brown, white and grey. The tegumen is without hooks.

== See also ==
- List of butterflies of India (Satyrinae)
