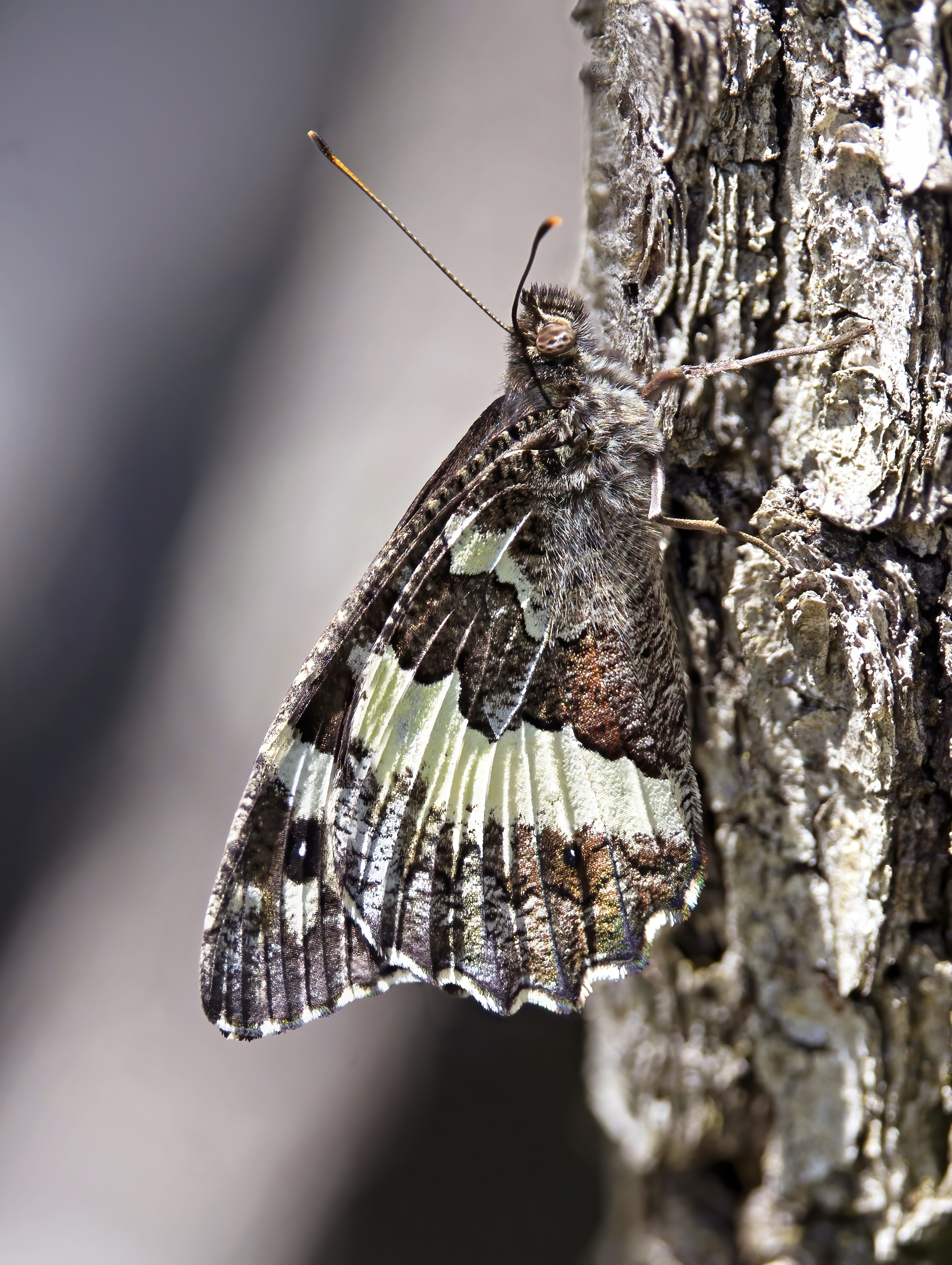
- Brintesia circe Rakov Škocjan, Slovenia

Scientific classification
- Kingdom: Animalia
- Phylum: Arthropoda
- Clade: Pancrustacea
- Class: Insecta
- Order: Lepidoptera
- Family: Nymphalidae
- Tribe: Satyrini
- Genus: Brintesia; Fruhstorfer, 1911
- Species: B. circe

Binomial name
- Brintesia circe (Fabricius, 1775)

Synonyms
- Genus level; Oreas Hübner, [1806]; Oreas Oken, 1815; Species level; Hipparchia circe; Kanetisa circe; Papilio circe Fabricius, 1775; Papilio proserpina Denis & Schiffermüller, 1775

= Brintesia =

Genus of butterflies

Brintesia is a monotypic butterfly genus in the family Nymphalidae and subfamily Satyrinae. Its one species is Brintesia circe, the great banded grayling.

== Description ==
Brintesia circe reaches on average wingspan of 65–80 millimetres (2.6–3.1 in). Its wings are mainly black or dark brown. They have a broad white band at the edge of the basal area of all wings and usually a second white streak on the lower wings. The black eyespots on the underside of the upper wings have a white contour. Brintesia circe is quite similar to Hipparchia fagi, but in the latter the second white streak on the lower wings is always missing and the eyespots have a yellow contour. These butterflies usually rest on the branches of a tree, protected by their cryptic markings, but ready to take off and fly away when disturbed.

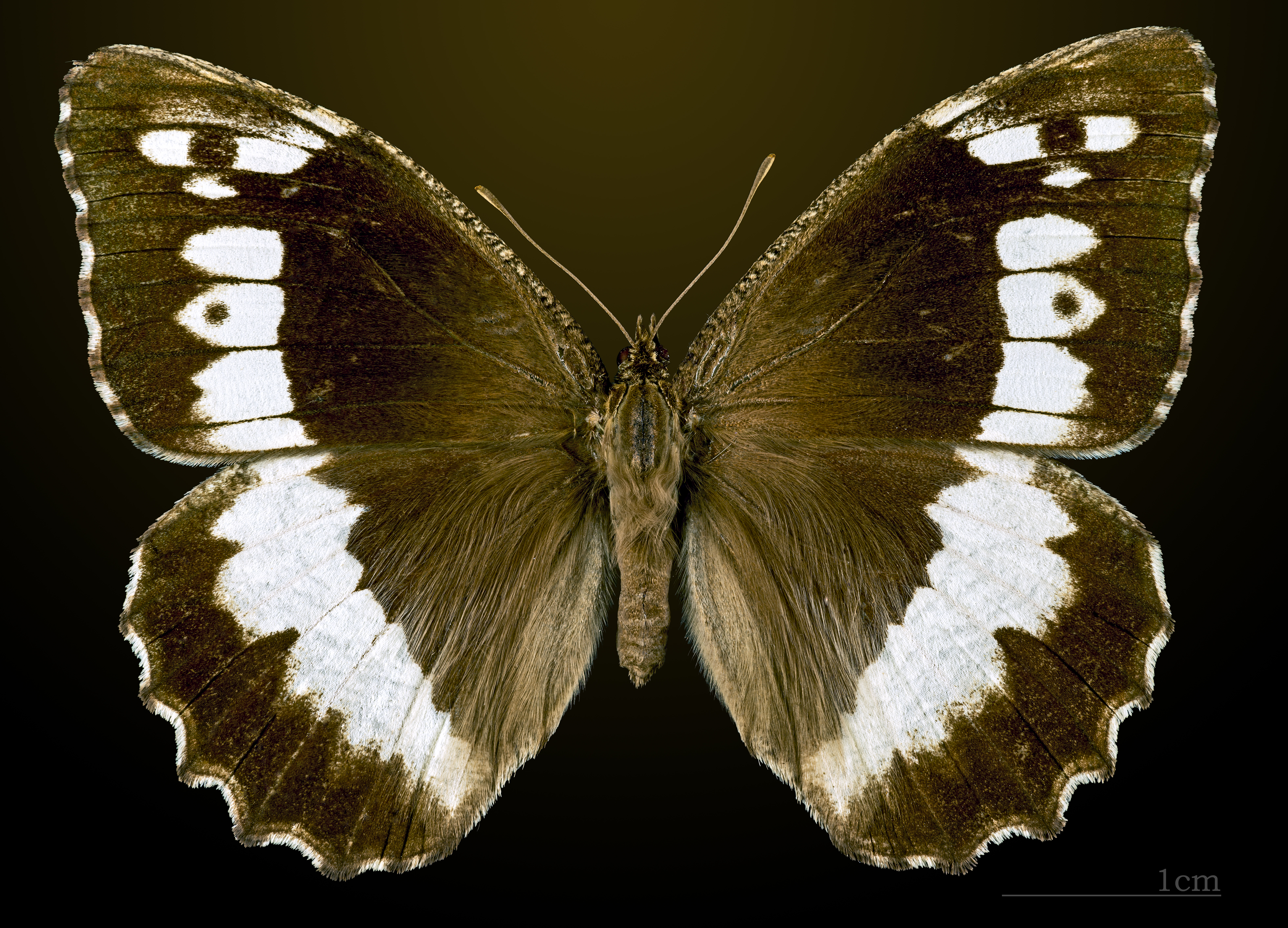
Female

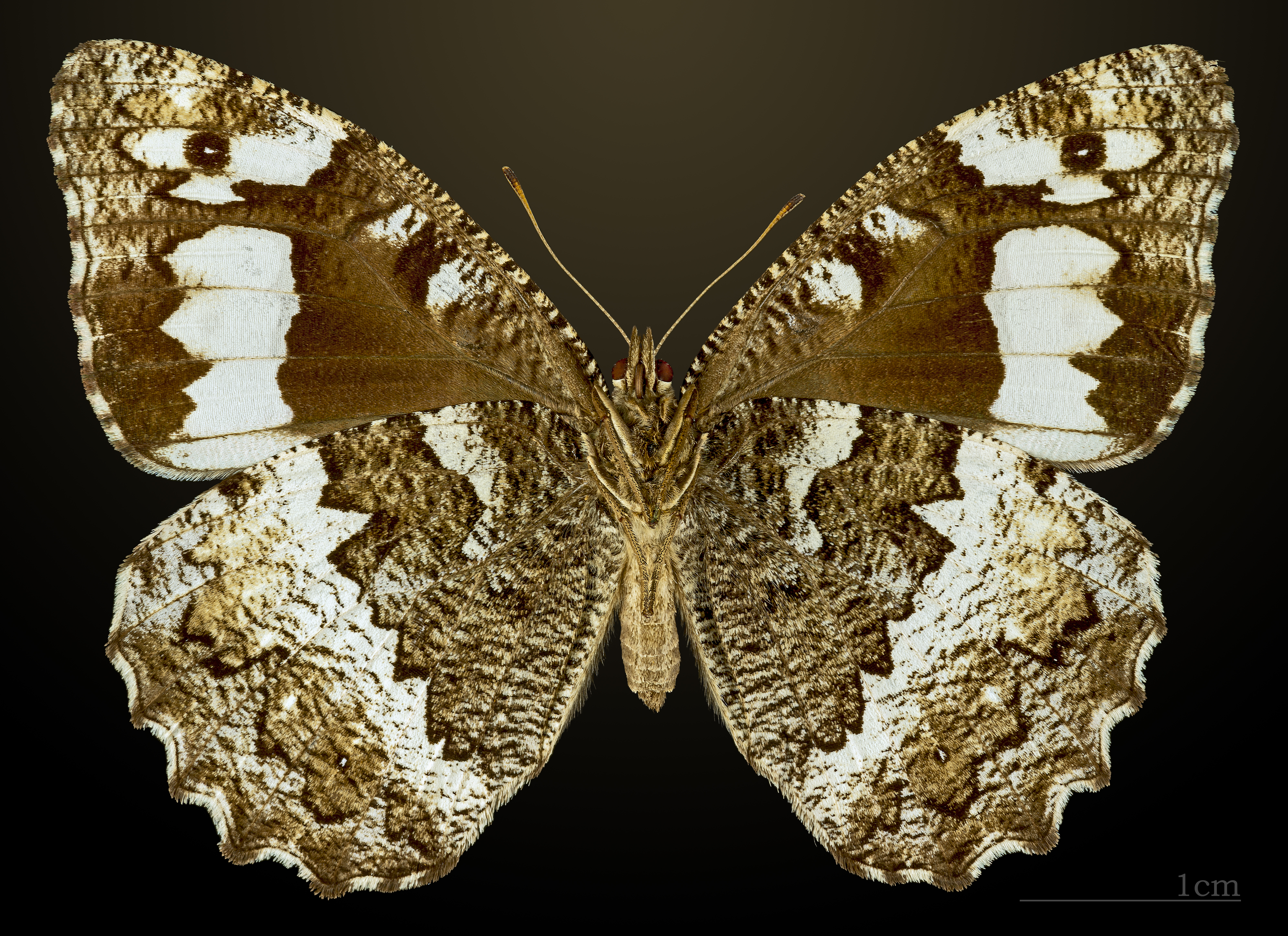
Female underside

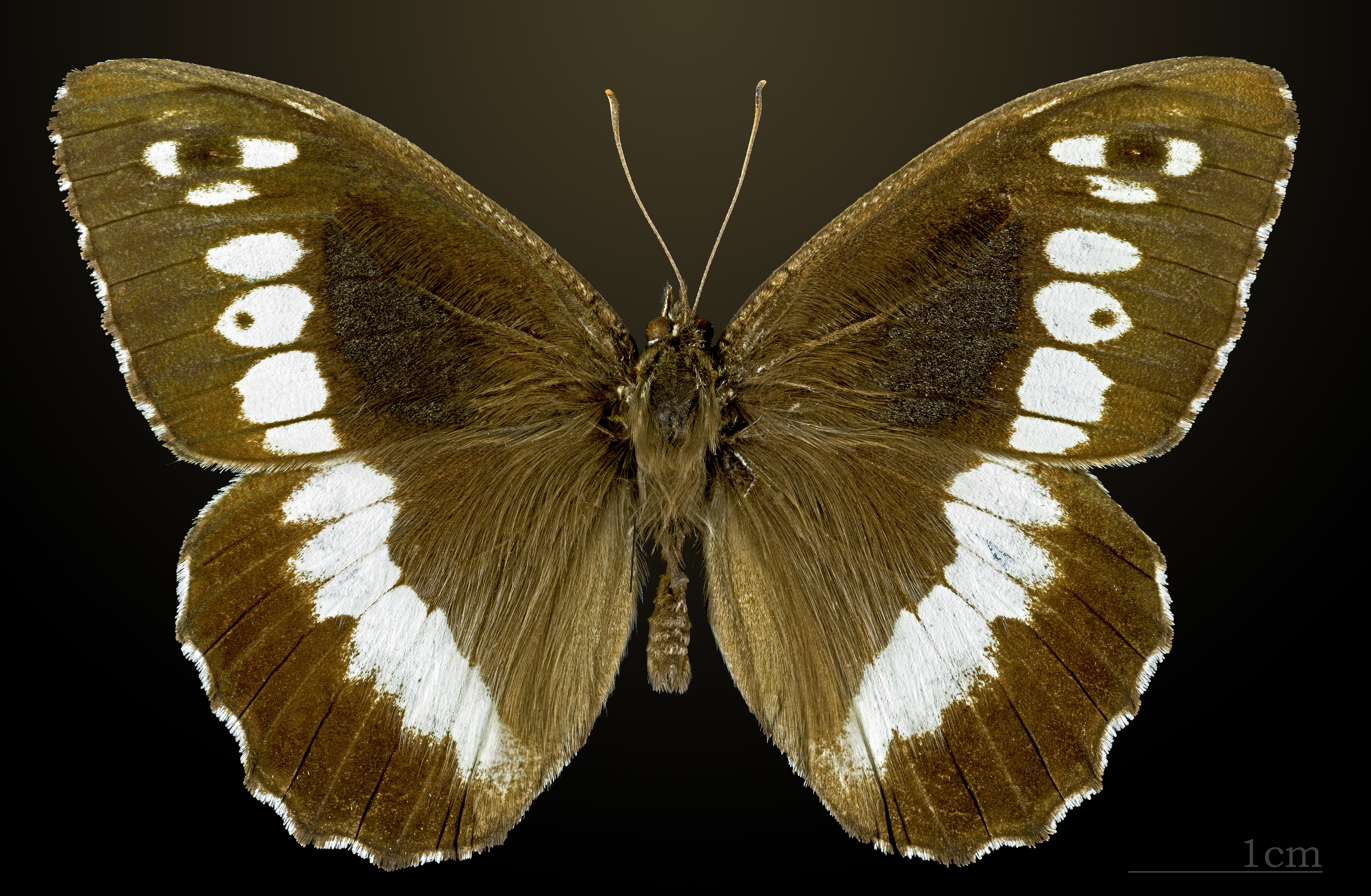
Male

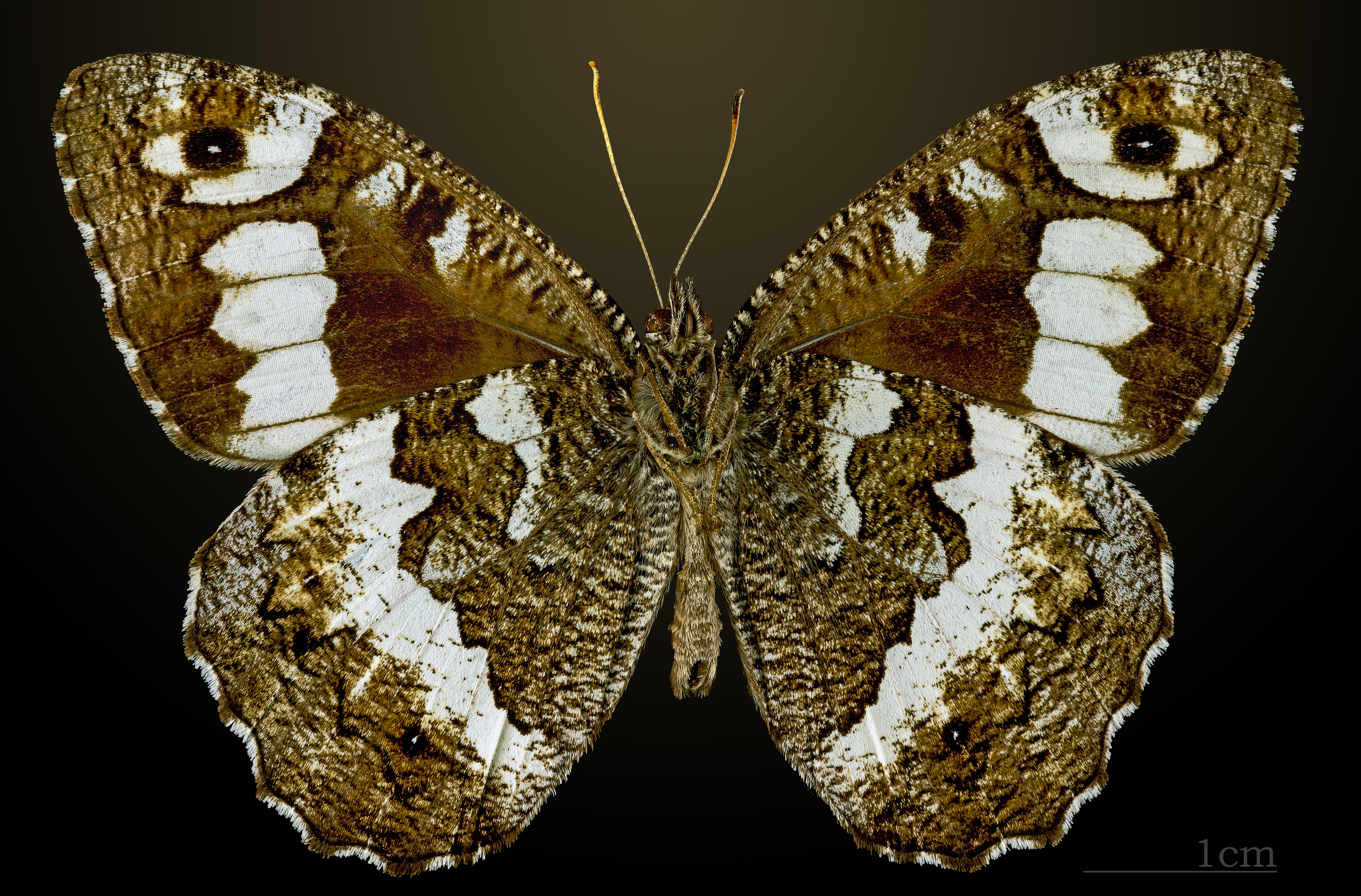
Male underside

== Description in Seitz ==
S. circe F. (= proserpina W. V) (41 e). Above deep black, with distinct apical ocellus, the spots forming the band ovate and contiguous. Underside marmorated with grey, often variegated with yellowish or brownish. The whole of South Europe, northward to Central Germany (Kassel), and from Portugal eastwards to the Libanon and Mesopotamia. — As asiatica form. nov. (41 e) we designate the form of the higher parts of the Taurus, in which the connection between the spots of the forewing is very narrow and the rather narrow band of the hindwing is externally saw-like, bearing pointed teeth. — Also a melanotic form with the band obsolescent is known: ab. silenus Stgr. — Larva yellowish brown, with a light-bordered dark dorsal line, the dirty yellow head being variegated with dark; on the paler sides there are alternately lighter, darker and reddish longitudinal lines; it lives till June on grasses (Lolium, Anthoxanthum odoratum, etc.) and turns into a chrysalis which lies free on the ground and is thick in the centre and narrowed to a point at both ends, being of a purple brown colour and showing on the wing-cases a chain of yellowish windows about in the place of the white band of the forewing. The butterflies are on the wing from July till September, flying with preference on grassy inclines where single oak-trees grow, and settle on bare places on the ground, mole-hills and on tree-trunks, always with the head upwards and the wings tightly closed and placed one over the other, the underside being adapted to the bark of trees. They rarely visit flowers, and then usually thistles, but one more often finds them on damp places on the roads. The flight of the males is slow, searching, but tumbling and rather fast when disturbed. In South Europe the species appears to occur everywhere very commonly, and it is still very abundant also in southern Germany (Darmstadt), being but rare in the north, extending to Waldeck and the Harz Mts.; more abundant and stronger in the west, near Toulouse for instance in giant specimens. At the south coast of Europe the species occurs in countless numbers; I counted once near Genoa more than 30 specimens on one tree.

== Biology ==
These butterflies fly in one generation from June to September feeding on nectar of flowers. Larvae feed on various herbaceous plants (mainly on Anthoxanthum, Bromus, Festuca and Sesleria species). The young larvae overwinter.

== Distribution ==
The species can be found in central and southern Europe (Spain, France, Italy, Greece, southern Germany and Poland), in Anatolia and the Caucasus up to Iran.

== Habitat ==
These butterflies prefer light woodland, grasslands bordering forest edges and generally dry and bushy environments, at an altitude of 0–1,600 metres (0–5,249 ft) above sea level.

== Subspecies ==
- Brintesia circe pannonia (Fruhstorfer, 1917)
- Brintesia circe venusta (Fruhstorfer, 1909)

== Gallery ==
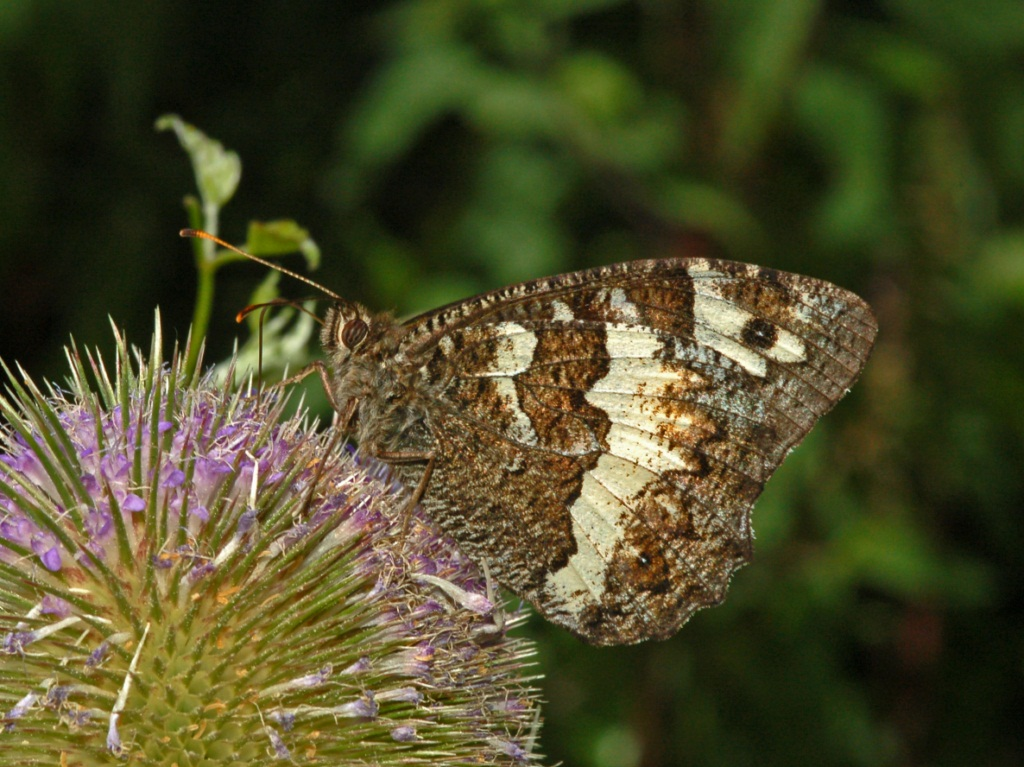
On a flower of Dipsacus fullonum

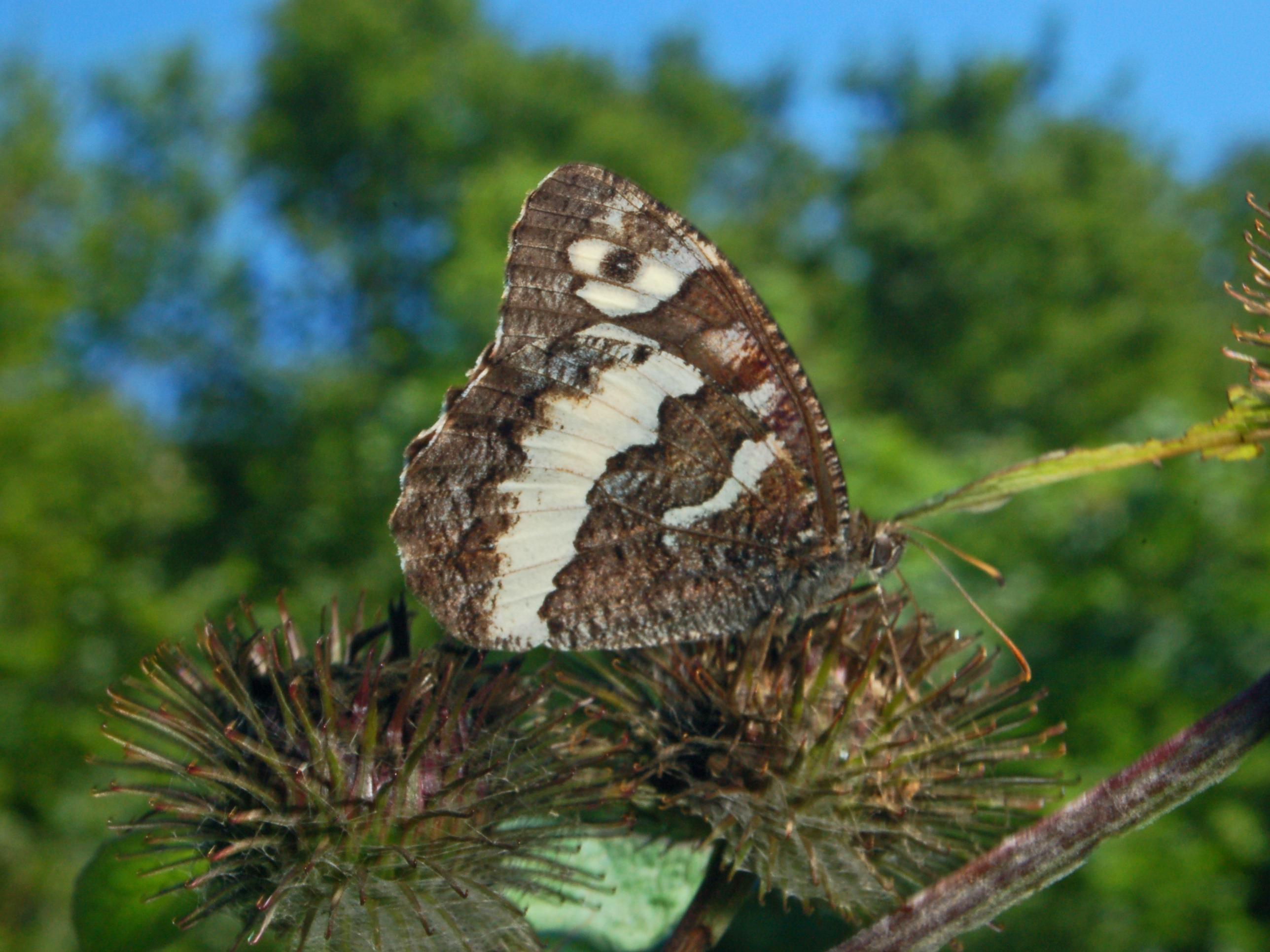
On Arctium tomentosum

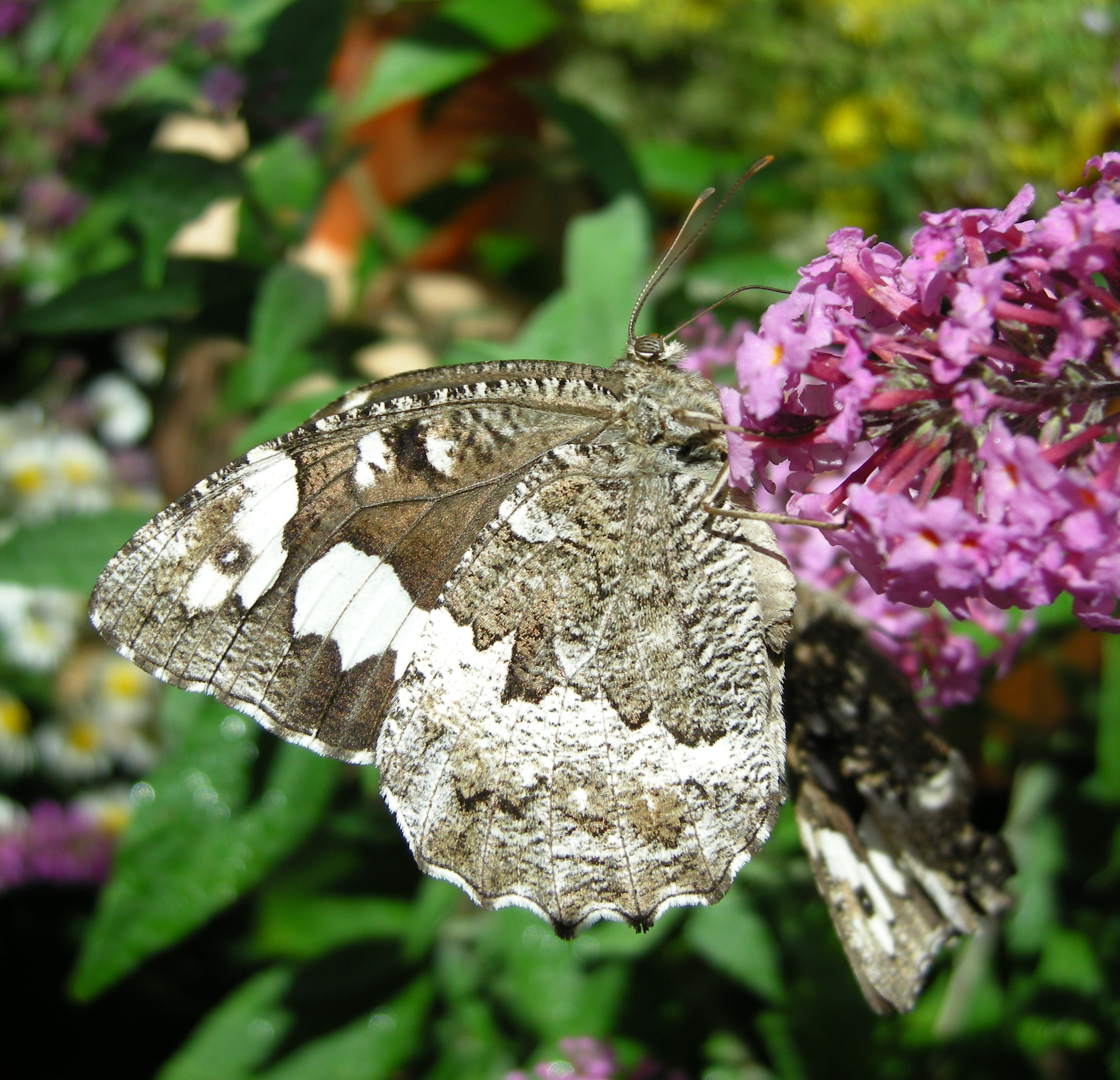
On a Buddleia davidii flower

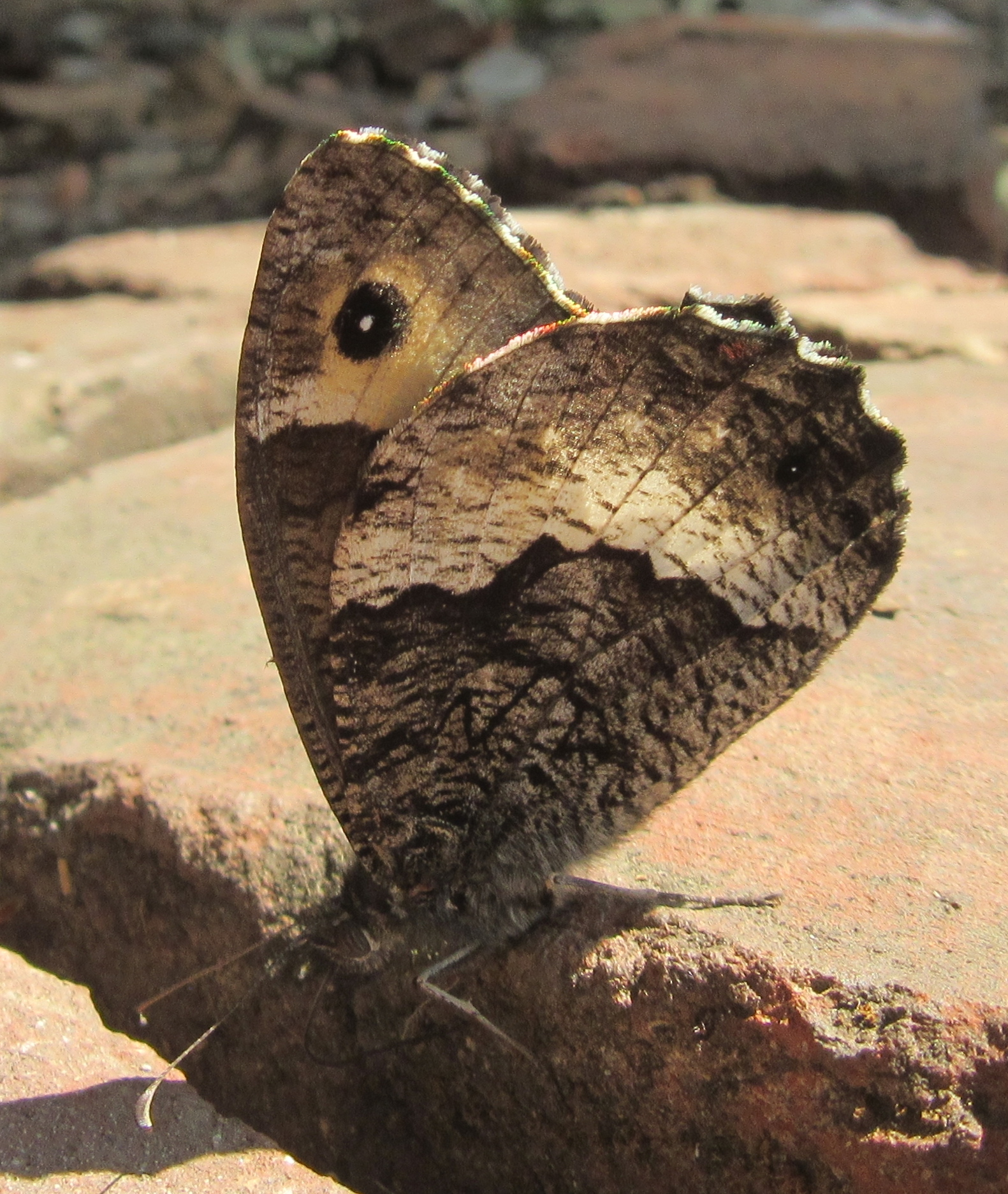
Lepidoptera, Brintesia circe (Monte Calvo, near Turin, Italy)

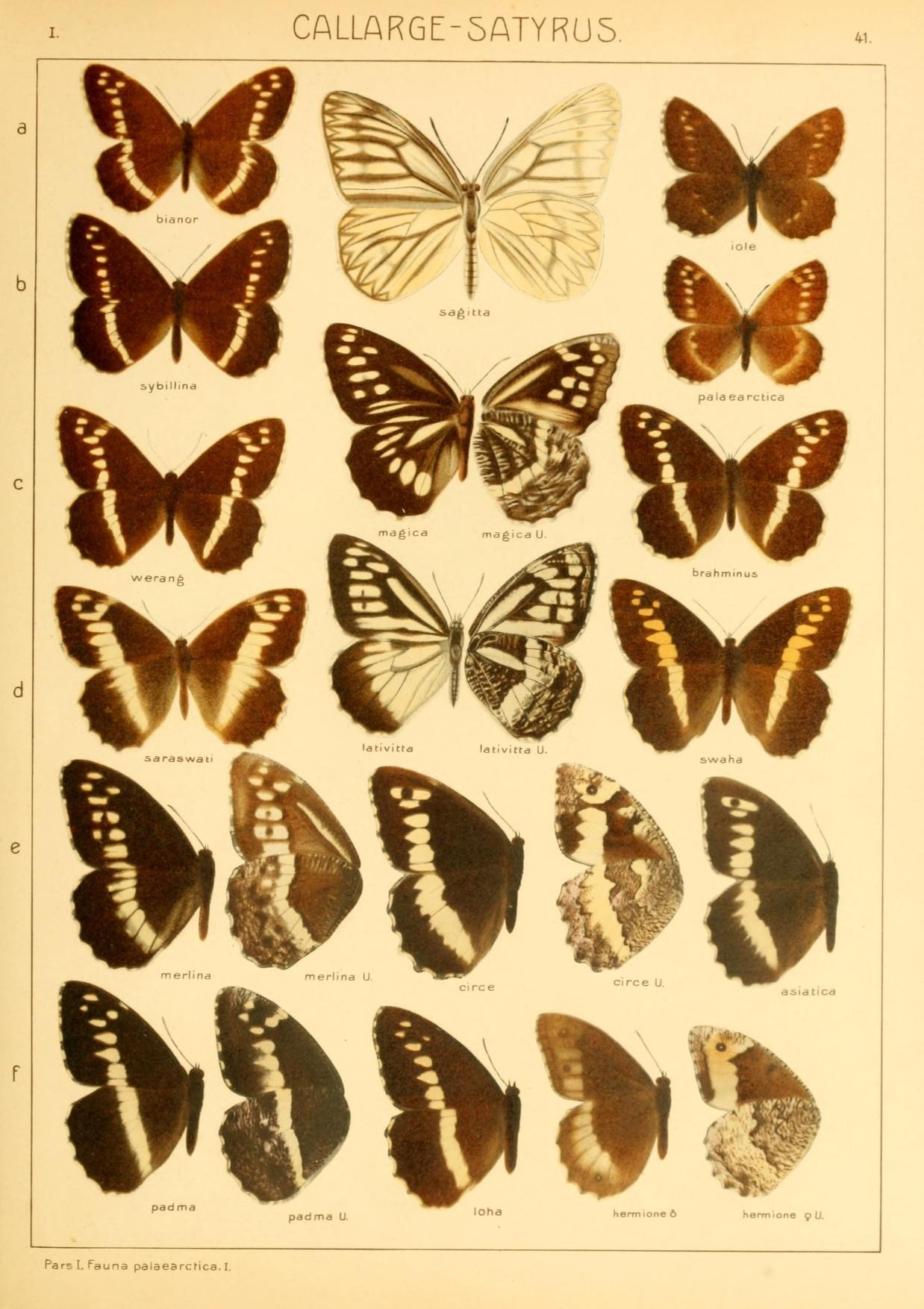
In Seitz
