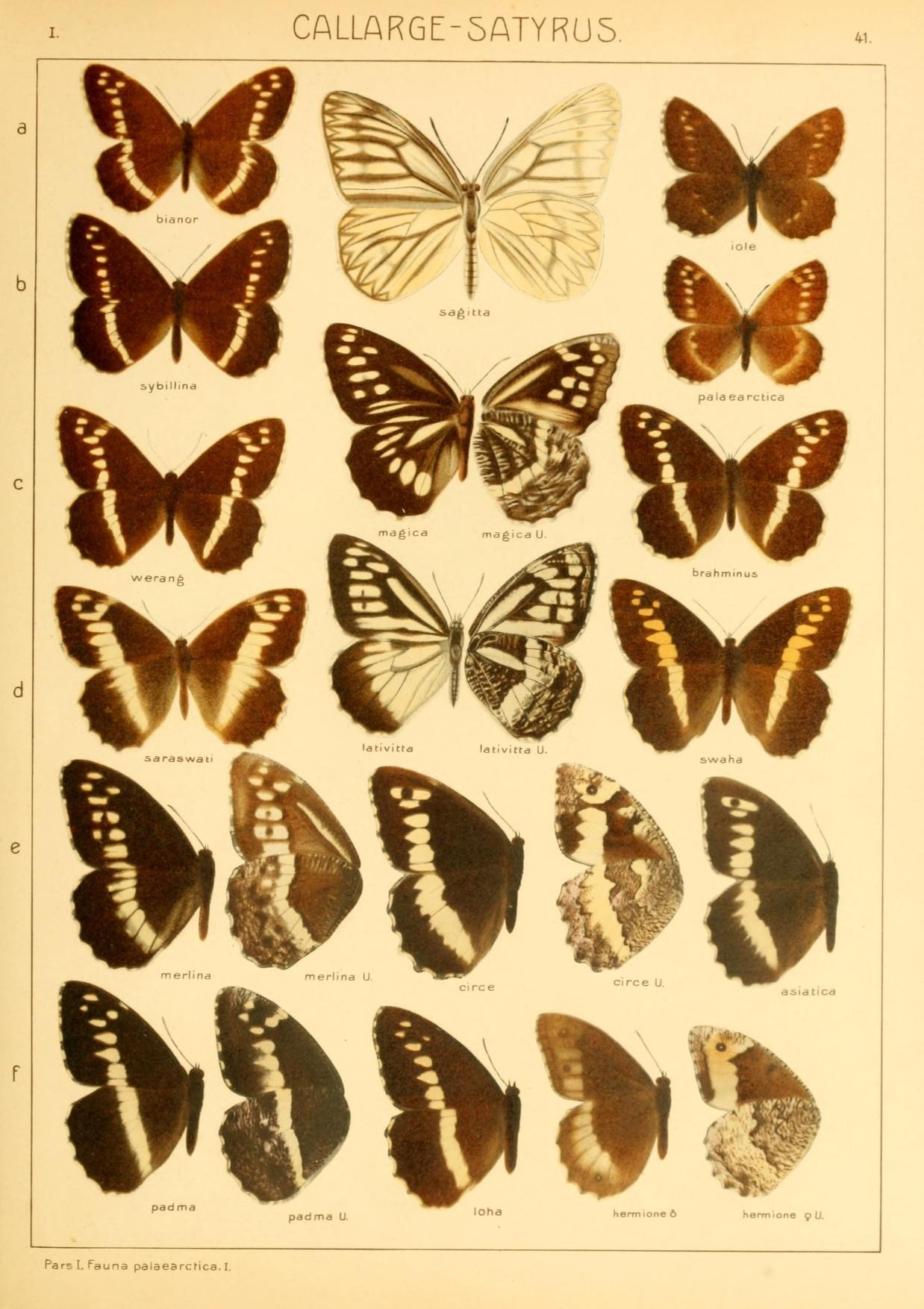
- Aulocera padma in Seitz (41f)
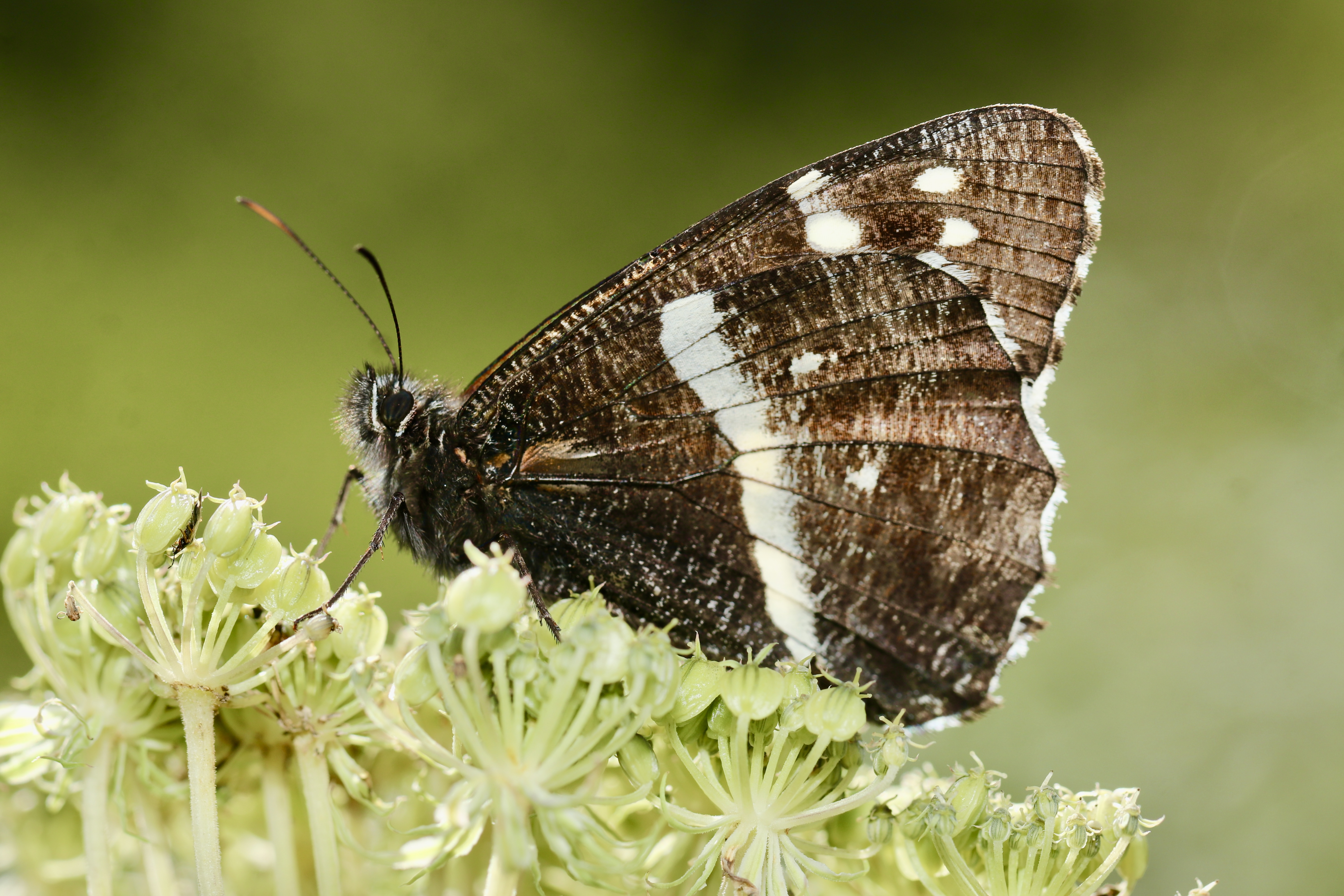

Scientific classification
- Kingdom: Animalia
- Phylum: Arthropoda
- Class: Insecta
- Order: Lepidoptera
- Family: Nymphalidae
- Genus: Aulocera
- Species: A. padma

Binomial name
- Aulocera padma Kollar, 1844

= Aulocera padma =

Great satyr

Species of butterfly

Aulocera padma, the great satyr, is a brown (Satyrinae) butterfly that ranges across the Himalayas to Assam, northern Burma and western China.

== Range ==
The butterfly is found in the Himalayas from Shingarh, (Zhob, Safed Koh, Kurram, Gilgit, Chitral, India (Kumaon, Bhutan, Sikkim and Chumbi Valleys) eastwards across to Abor valley, north Myanmar, west China and southeast Tibet .

== Status ==
In 1932, William Harry Evans reported that the species was not rare from Chitral to Sikkim, rare in the eastern extremity of its range and rare and very rare westwards. Mark Alexander Wynter-Blyth said that it was very abundant in the Himalayas and Assam.

== Description ==
The great satyr is 70 to 98 mm in wingspan. Dark brown above. With a white band across both wings. The upper hindwing is of even width throughout. It has a chequered fringe and a dark apical spot or ocellus on the forewing. The under hindwing is dark.

== Habits ==
The great satyr has a powerful graceful flight and is easily recognised on the wing. It is found in all kinds of terrain above 4,000 feet (1,200 m) and prefers open areas especially on ridges and hilltops above 7,500 feet (2,300 m):

It is fond of settling, especially on roads and stones, and as it is not at all wary is very easy to catch. The male is a very quarrelsome insect and will often take up a position on some rock and chase after any butterfly that comes near.

— Mark Alexander Wynter-Blyth, Butterflies of the Indian Region (1957)

== Reproduction ==
The great satyr has two broods (unlike the others of its genus). The first brood appears from the end of April to the onset of the rainy season and is very common. The scarce second brood flies after the monsoon. The larva feeds on Gramineae.

== See also ==
- List of butterflies of India (Satyrinae)
