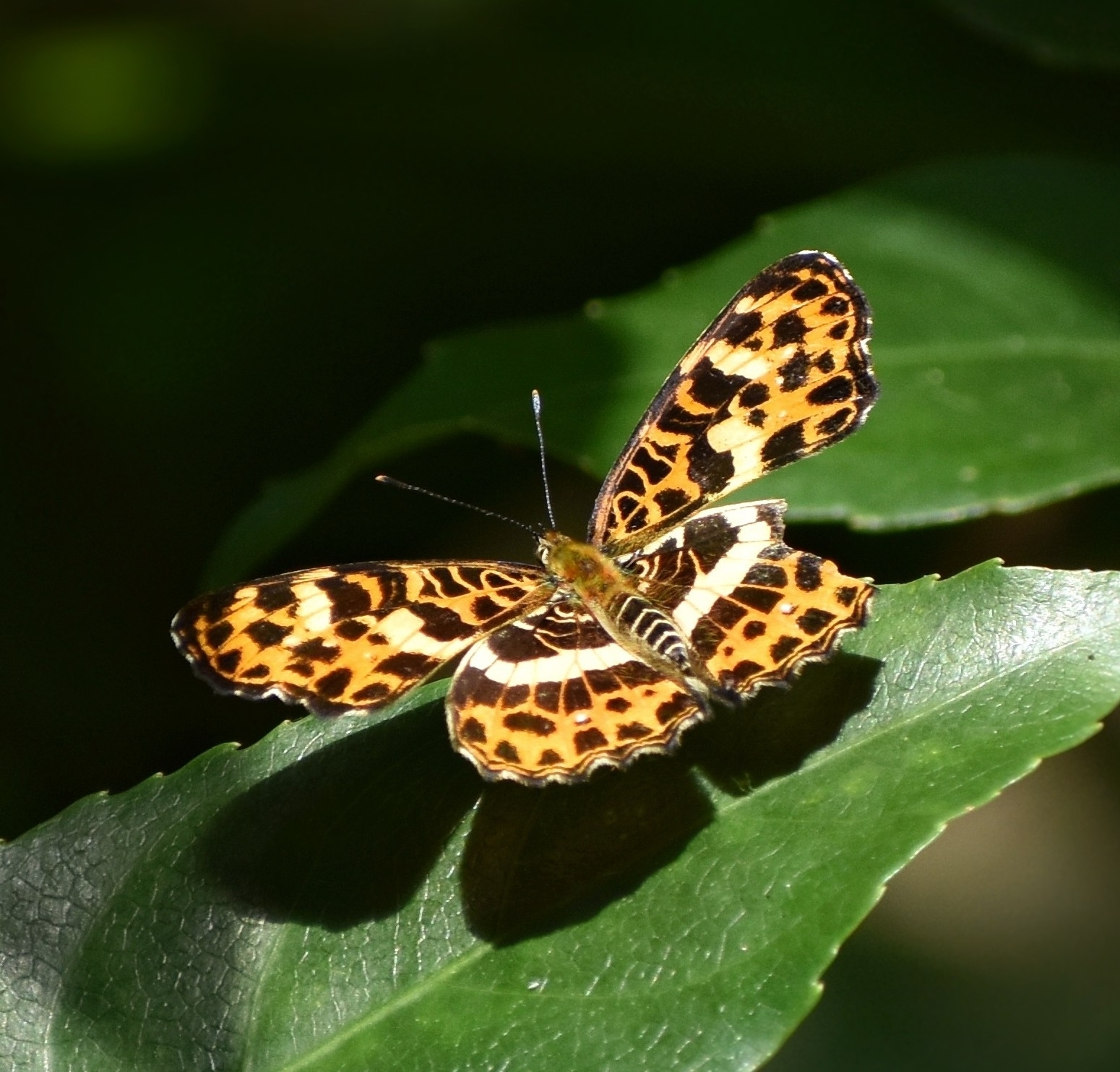

Scientific classification
- Domain: Eukaryota
- Kingdom: Animalia
- Phylum: Arthropoda
- Class: Insecta
- Order: Lepidoptera
- Family: Nymphalidae
- Genus: Araschnia
- Species: A. doris

Binomial name
- Araschnia doris Leech, 1892

= Araschnia doris =

Species of butterfly

Araschnia doris is a butterfly found in the Palearctic that belongs to the browns family. It is endemic to West and Central China.

== Description from Seitz ==
A. doris Leech (male 64e, female 64f) again closely resembles burejana, but also recalls strigosa[subspecies of Araschnia burejana]. It differs from both in the more rounded wings and in the markings of the distal marginal area of the hindwing. On the latter the blue-spotted submarginal band is absent, being replaced by a row of rounded or partly quadrangular black spots, also the underside of the hindwing exhibiting some essential differences, so that the specific distinctness appears to be established. — Central and West China (June, July).
