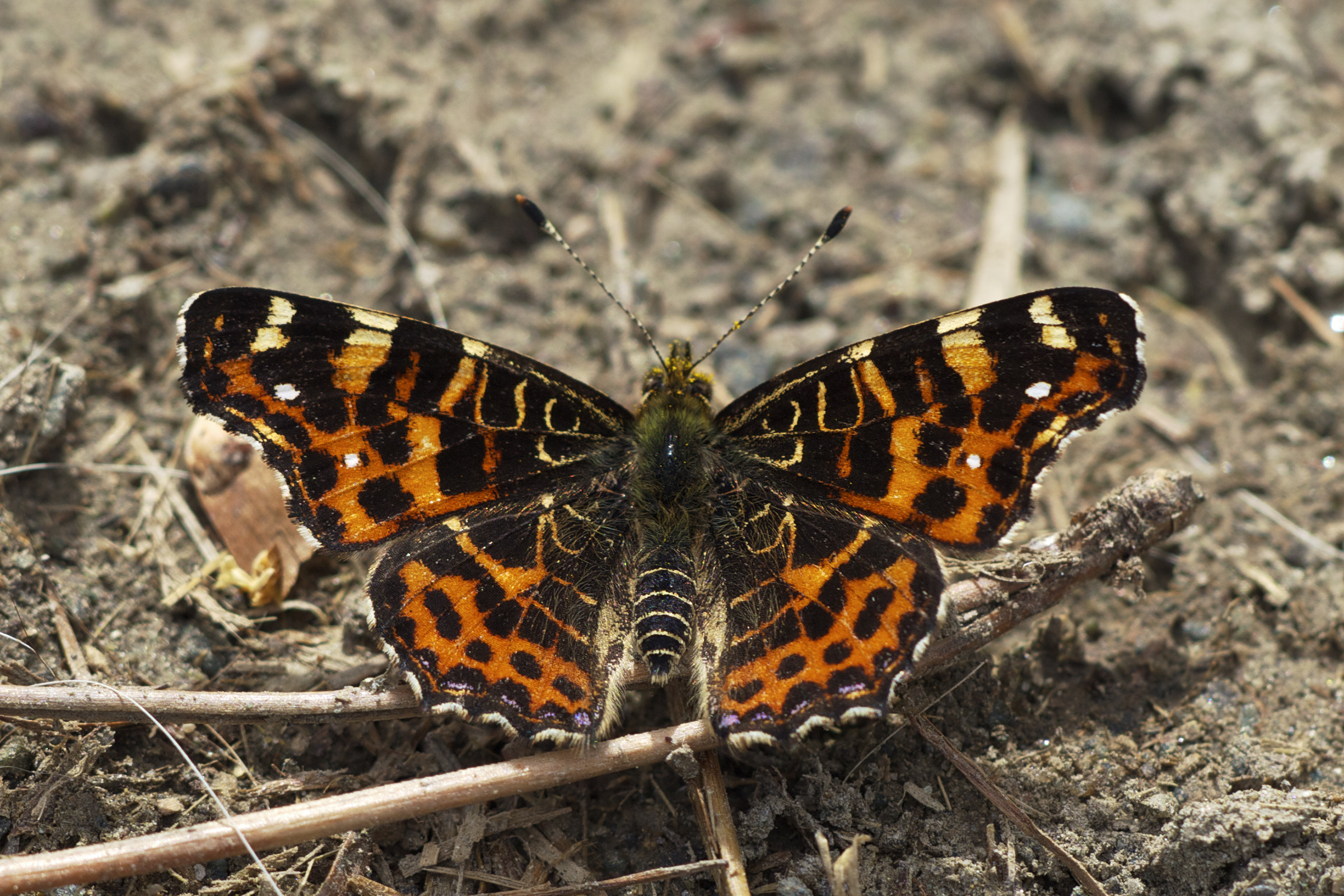
- In Germany
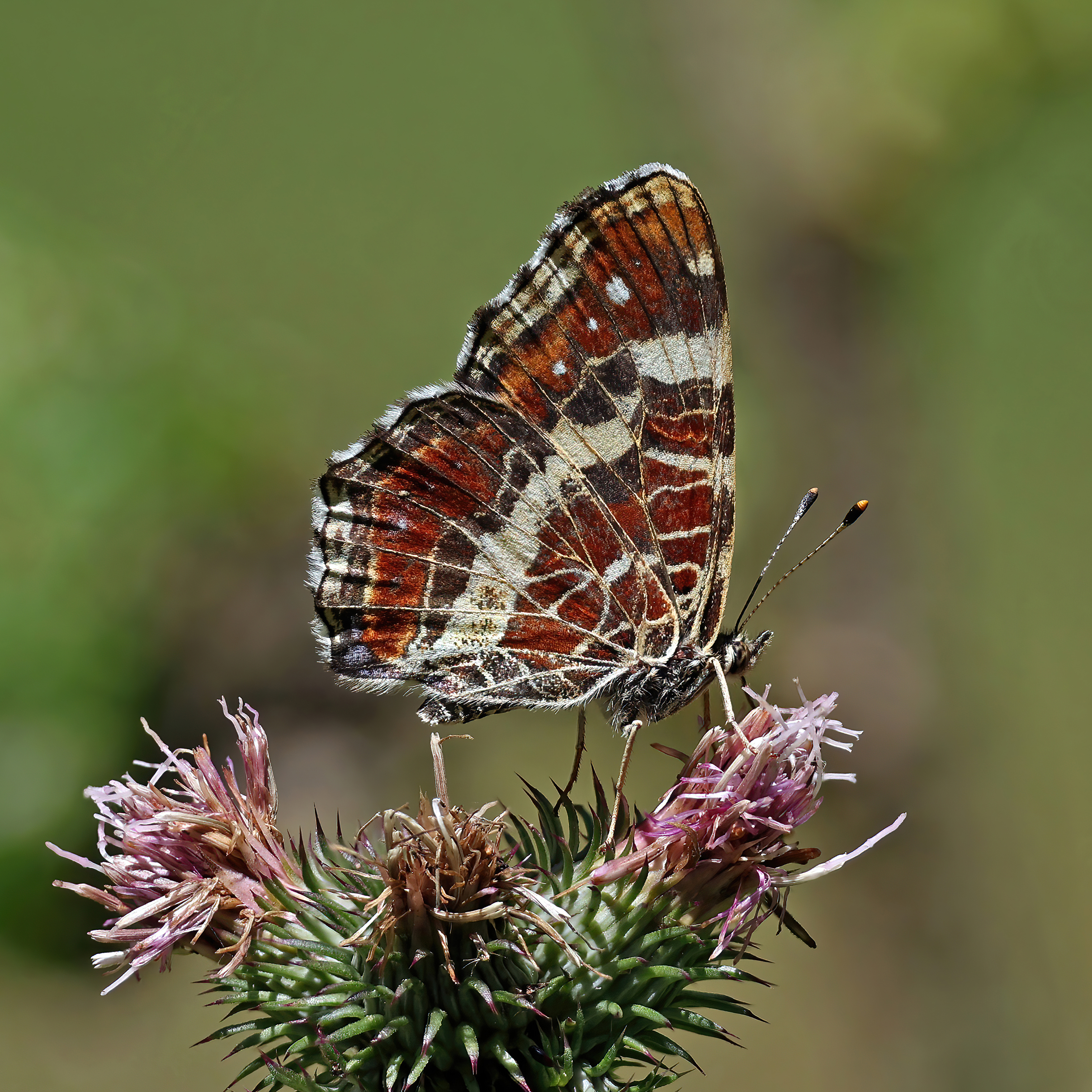
- Form prorsa in Romania

Scientific classification
- Kingdom: Animalia
- Phylum: Arthropoda
- Class: Insecta
- Order: Lepidoptera
- Family: Nymphalidae
- Genus: Araschnia
- Species: A. levana

Binomial name
- Araschnia levana (Linnaeus, 1758)

= Map (butterfly) =

Butterfly of the family Nymphalidae

The map (Araschnia levana) is a butterfly of the family Nymphalidae. It is found from Spain through Europe and east through the Palearctic to Central Asia and the Russian Far East to Korea and Japan.

The map exhibits seasonal dimorphism which means it has two different forms, depending on whether its larva grows in the summer or the winter. The summer form has black wings, while the winter form – adapted for diapause – has red wings. Before the butterfly was fully understood, these were thought to be two different species, with the summer form originally classified as A. prorsa. These are now referred to as morphs of A. levana, named levana and prorsa.

== Distribution ==
The area of distribution of the map extends from Spain through Europe and east through the Palearctic to Central Asia and the Russian Far East to Korea and Japan.

== Spread in western Europe ==
Despite a temporary decline in individual regions of Europe, there has been a general increase within the populated areas for more than 100 years. In Germany, the map was only locally represented until the 1930s, from the middle of the century it was already widespread and in places frequently encountered. In the second half of the 20th century it spread in Germany to the north and west across Lower Saxony and North Rhine-Westphalia and Schleswig-Holstein and the Netherlands to the North Sea coast. Already 1881 it was present in Jutland (Denmark). In 1955, the northern distribution limit of indigenous Danish populations was Falster, Lolland and Zealand. It reached Sweden in the 1970s, and in 1973 it was first seen in Finland. A. levana was found on 30 May 1973, in southeastern Finland, in Lauritsala, by a young lepidopterist, Mr Jouko E. Hokka. The specimen was the first known A. levana in northern Europe, excluding Denmark. Since 1983, the map has been established in Finland and has since steadily increased its area.

In the UK this species is a very rare vagrant, but there have also been several unsuccessful – and now illegal – attempts at introducing this species over the past 100 years or so: in the Wye Valley in 1912, the Wyre Forest in the 1920s, South Devon 1942, Worcester 1960s, Cheshire 1970s, South Midlands 1990s. All these introductions failed and eggs or larvae have never been recorded in the wild in the UK. (Under the Wildlife and Countryside Act 1981 it is now illegal to release a non-native species into the wild.)

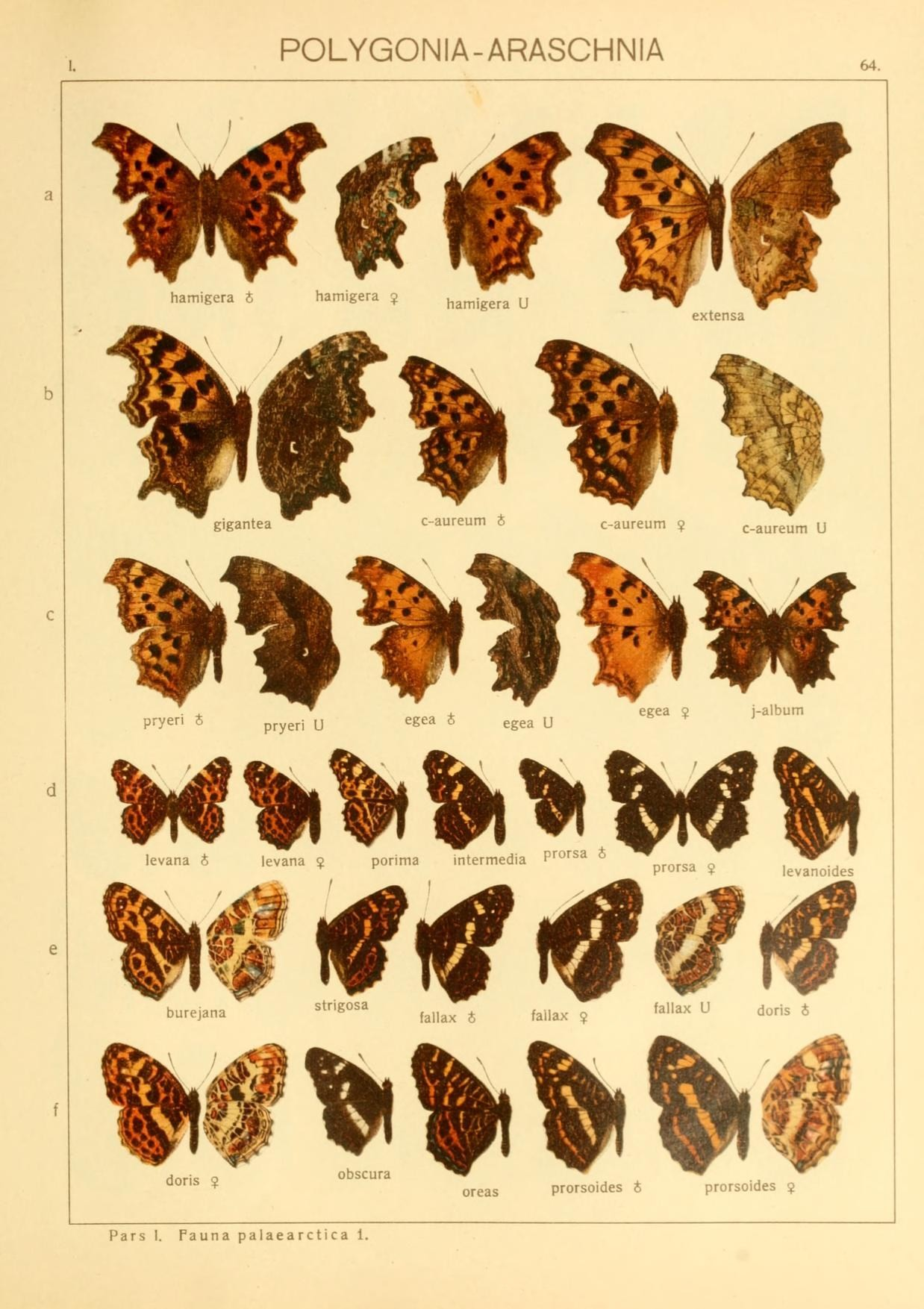
Seitz Plate 64

== Description in Seitz ==
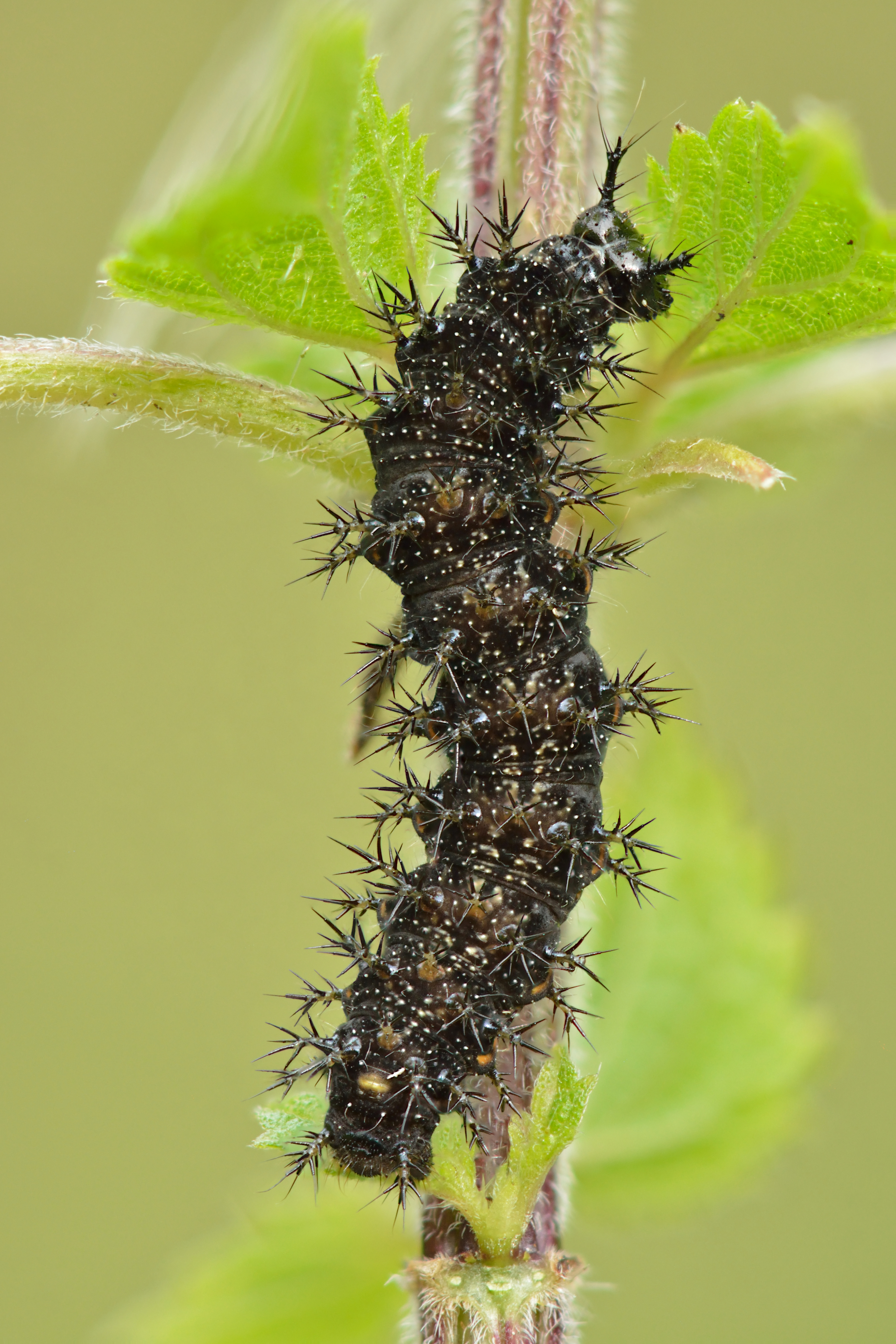
Caterpillar on the common nettle

A. levana L. (64d) has on a reddish ochreous ground a characteristic pattern of spots, some whitish subapical and distomarginal spots on the forewing and a row of blue bars near the distal margin of the hindwing. The underside of the forewing on the whole agrees with the upper, but the apical area bears violet dusting, the ground-colour is paler, and there are sharply defined white lines at the cell-spots; the hindwing is for the greater part red-brown, bearing in the centre a pale transverse band which widens behind, in places light lines traverse the wing and there is a dull violet smear in the distal area; the margin of both wings bears thin black lines. This is the first brood, which flies early in the spring (April–May). There occur among the ordinary form occasionally specimens in which the black basal and costal markings are confluent and both wings dark-margined, while the other markings of the wings (in the centre) are quite or nearly obsolete, these areas therefore being nearly uniformly red-brown. This is ab. frivaldszkyi Aigner. The summer-brood (July till August), sometimes also a third brood (September–October), is essentially different, being known as ab. prorsa L. (64d). Black, the forewing with white spots, the hindwing with a white transverse band; for the greater part red-brown beneath, with whitish lines and bands. On the upperside there appear vestiges of reddish yellow lines at the distal margin; specimens in which these lines are absent or only in places slightly indicated, while the white markings are narrowed, are ab. obscura Fruhst. (64f). If the white marking is narrowed to a yellowish stripe, or if the hindwing is entirely black, the name ab. schultzi Pfitzn. may be employed. Specimens in which the upperside is entirely without white bands, the small spots in the distal area being either present or absent, have been named ab. weismanni Fisch. (artificially produced). On the other hand, the individuals with the bands partly yellowish and the reddish yellow distal markings strongly developed may be named ab. intermedia form. nov. (64d); not rare in nature, being especially frequent in wet and cold summers. It forms the transition to ab. porima O. (64d) which is already so much changed in the direction of the spring-brood that the reddish yellow colour in the distal area forms the ground-colour, the bands of prorsa, however, still being visible. Finally, ab. diluta Spul. is an artificially produced variety which resembles porima, but the forewing has an archaic Nymphalidian character in the row of spots recalling the ocelli found in the Satyrids. All these forms are connected by intergradations, prorsa being considered the more recent form, which can be changed by the application of cold into levana (the ancestral form), while the inverse does not take place. — The egg of the species is ovate, flattened above, ribbed, of a greenish colour. The larva feeds on Urtica dioica gregariously; it is black or pale brown with black stripes, sometimes with a reddish side-line, armed with short branched thorns, which are black, sometimes yellow. Pupa brown, spotted with blackish, the projections of the head and back obtuse, sometimes with metallic spots. The pupa of the last brood hibernates. The species is distributed over Central and East Europe (except England) southward to Dalmatia, through Armenia, Siberia, Amurland, Ussuri, Corea to Japan (here apparently in 3 broods), the varieties recurring in the East without showing any striking or constant differences from those of the West.

== Seasonal dimorphism ==
The map is unusual in that its two annual broods look very different. The summer brood are black with white markings, looking like a miniature version of the white admiral and lacking most of the orange of the pictured spring brood.

== Biology ==
The eggs are laid in long strings, one on top of the other, on the underside of stinging nettles, the larval food plant. It is thought that these strings of eggs mimic the flowers of the nettles, thereby evading predators. The larvae feed gregariously and hibernate as pupae.

The map prefers moist habitats with stinging nettles, as they are found in open forest, at forest edges and transitional moors. both the needs of the caterpillars for high humidity and shade as well as the moths for abundant flowering perennials must be met. The insect lives in the flat and hilly country of the lowlands and rarely rises more than 1000 meters.

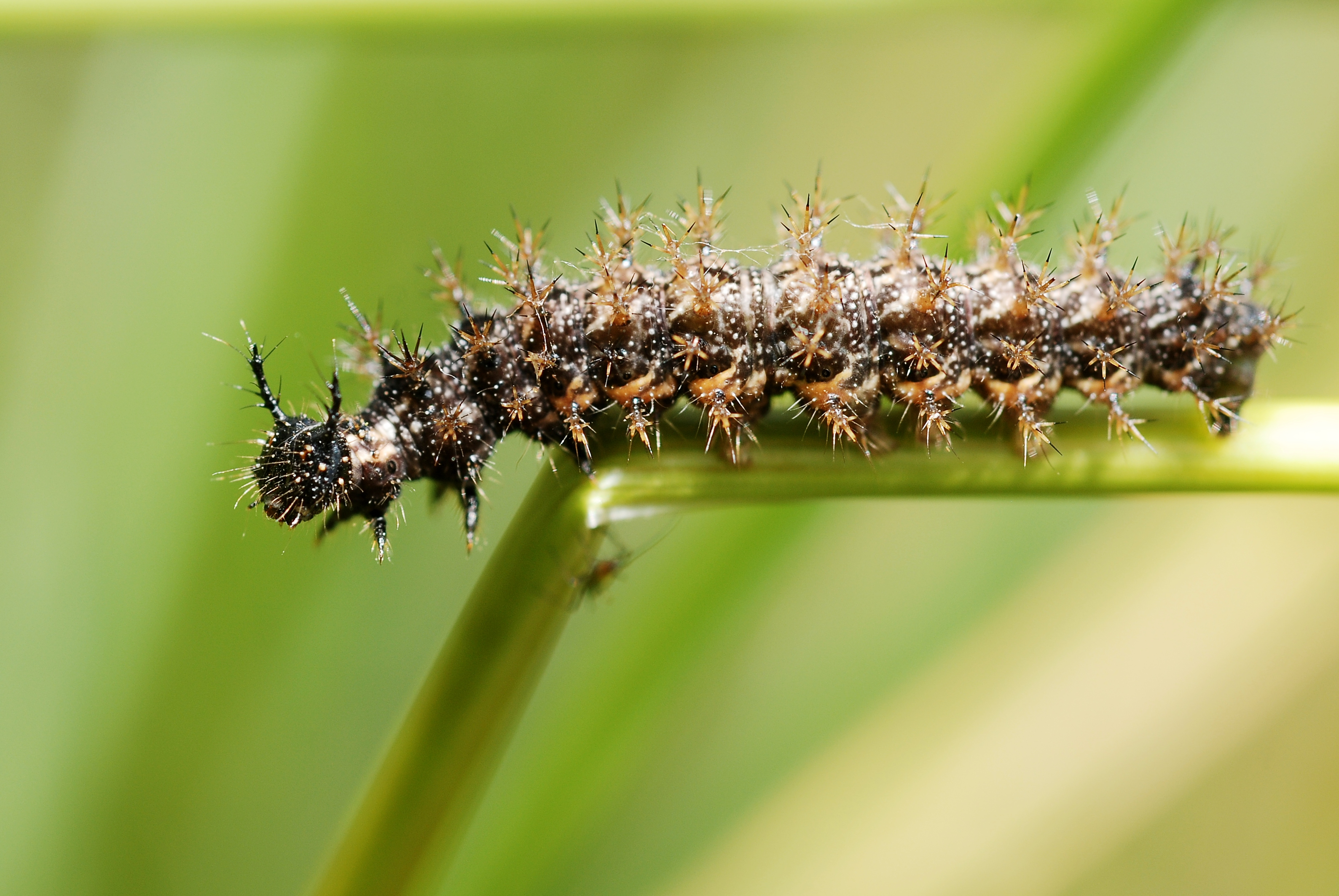
Caterpillar

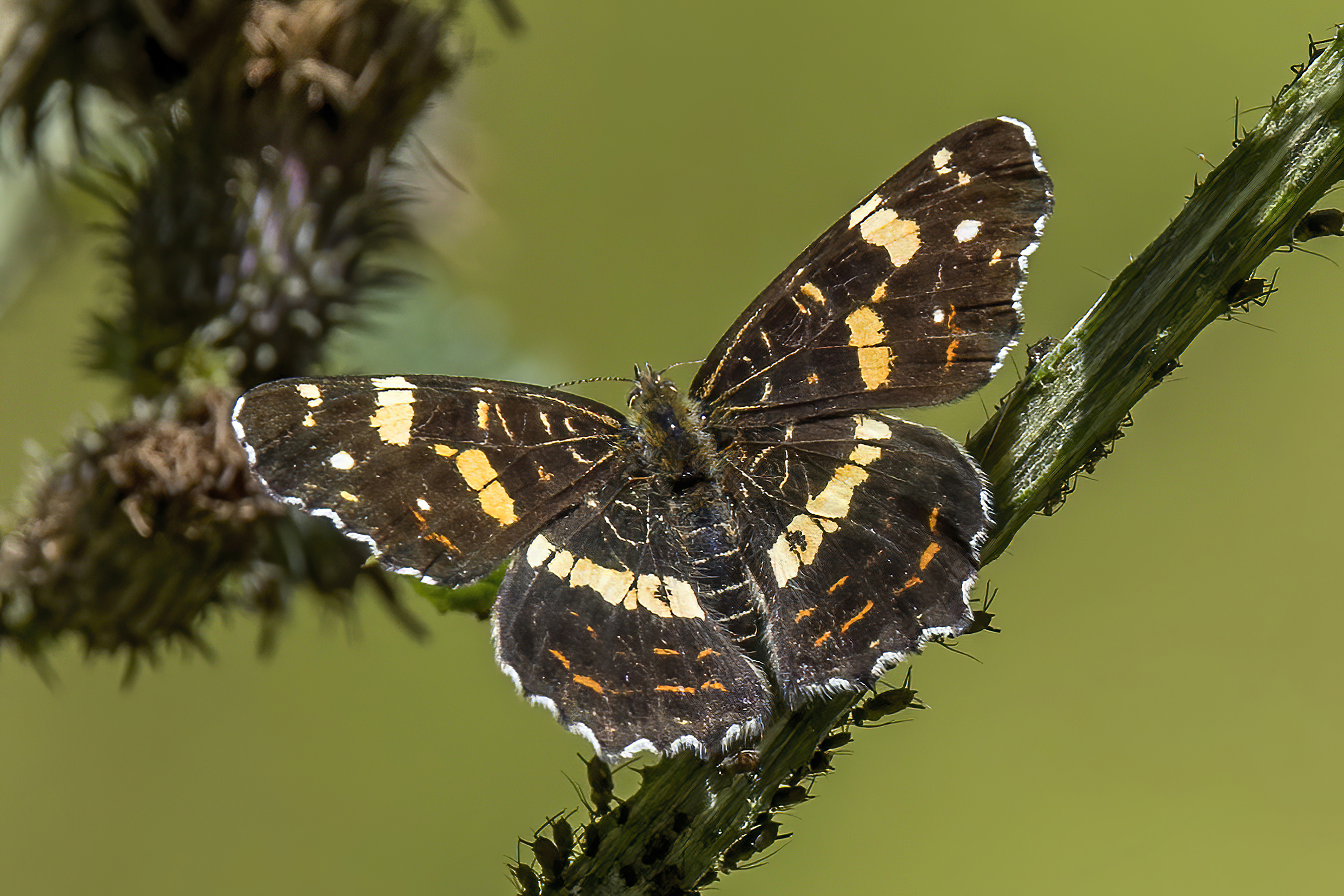
Form prorsa
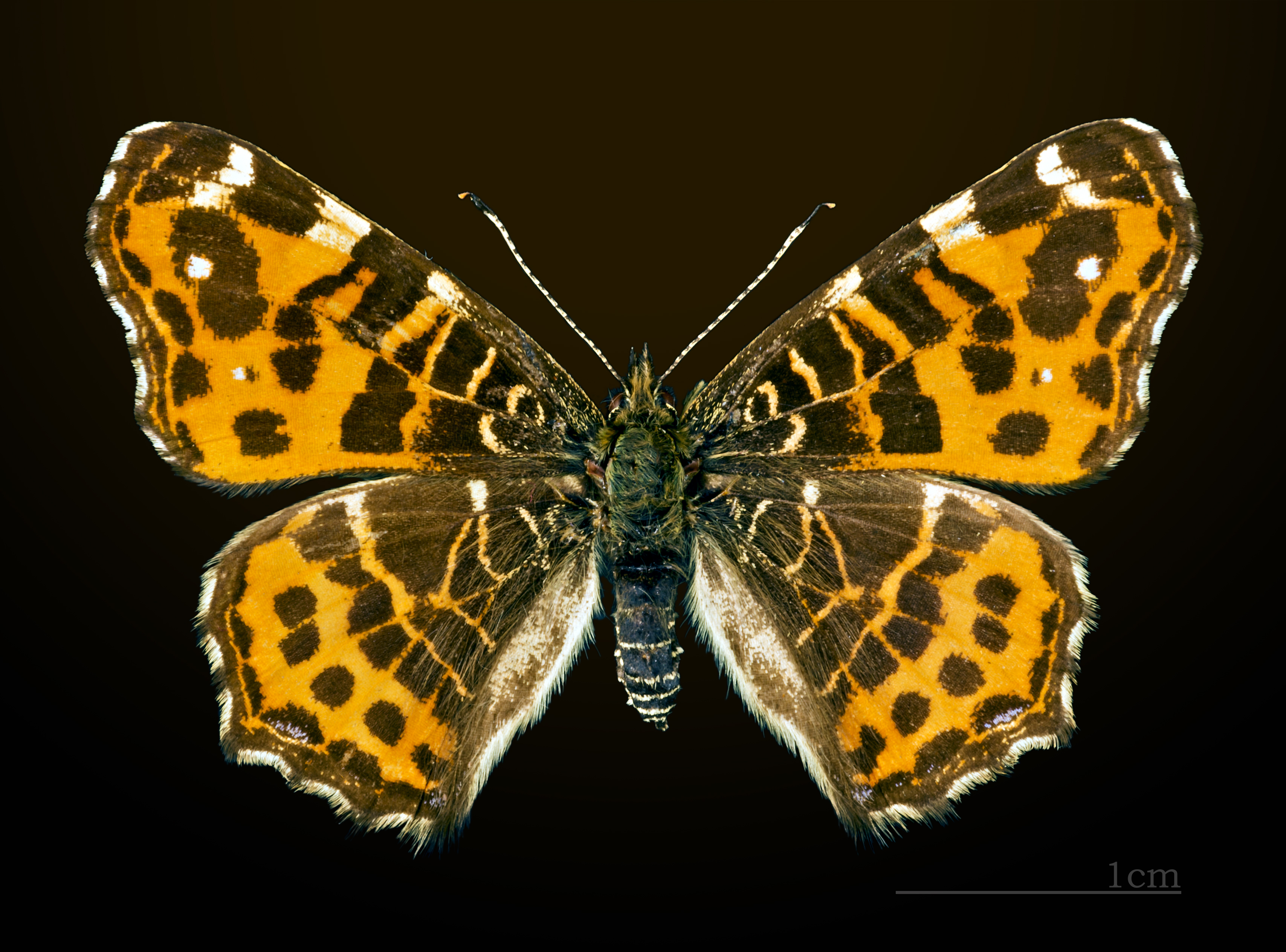
Form levana

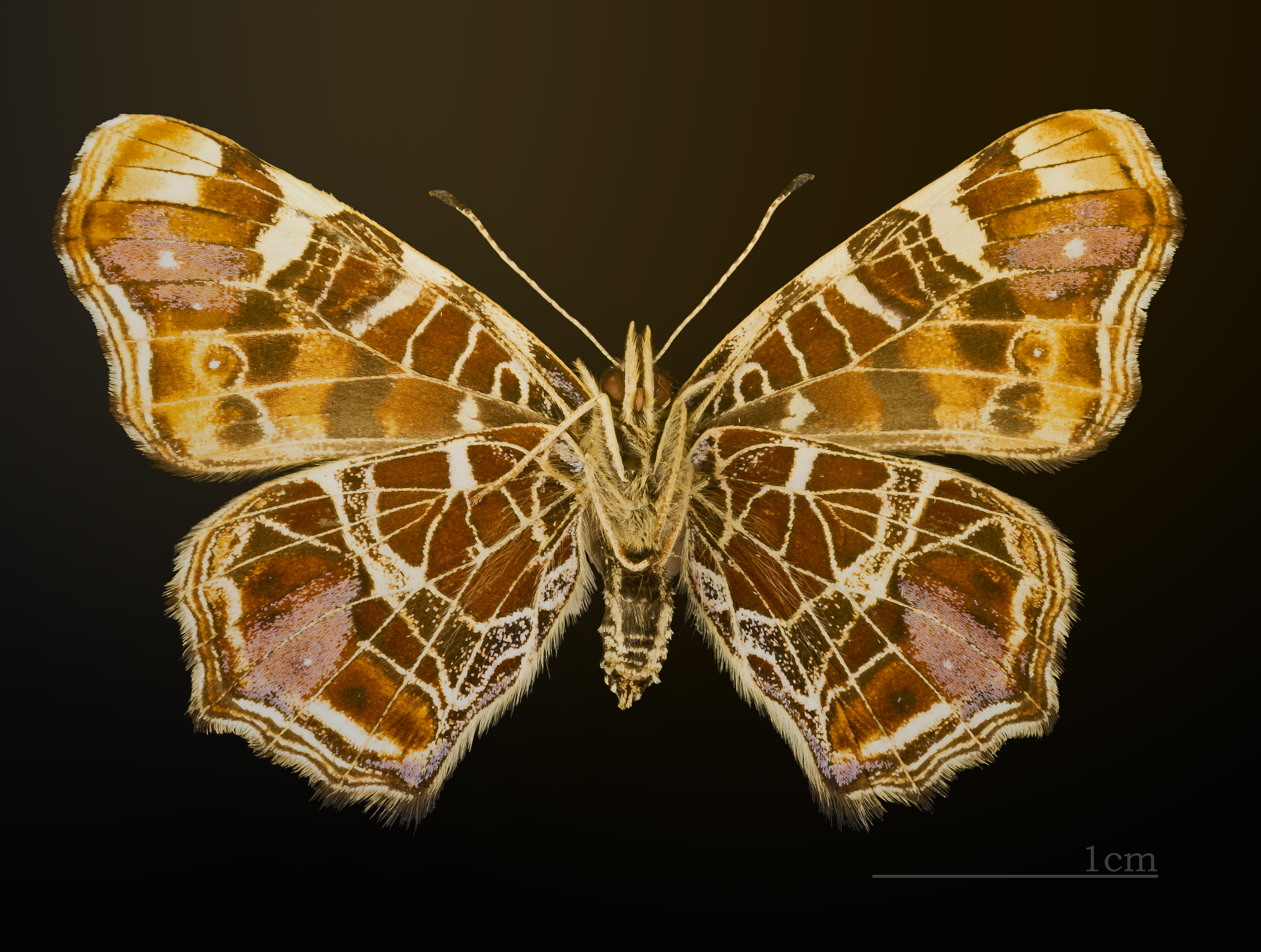
Form levana underside

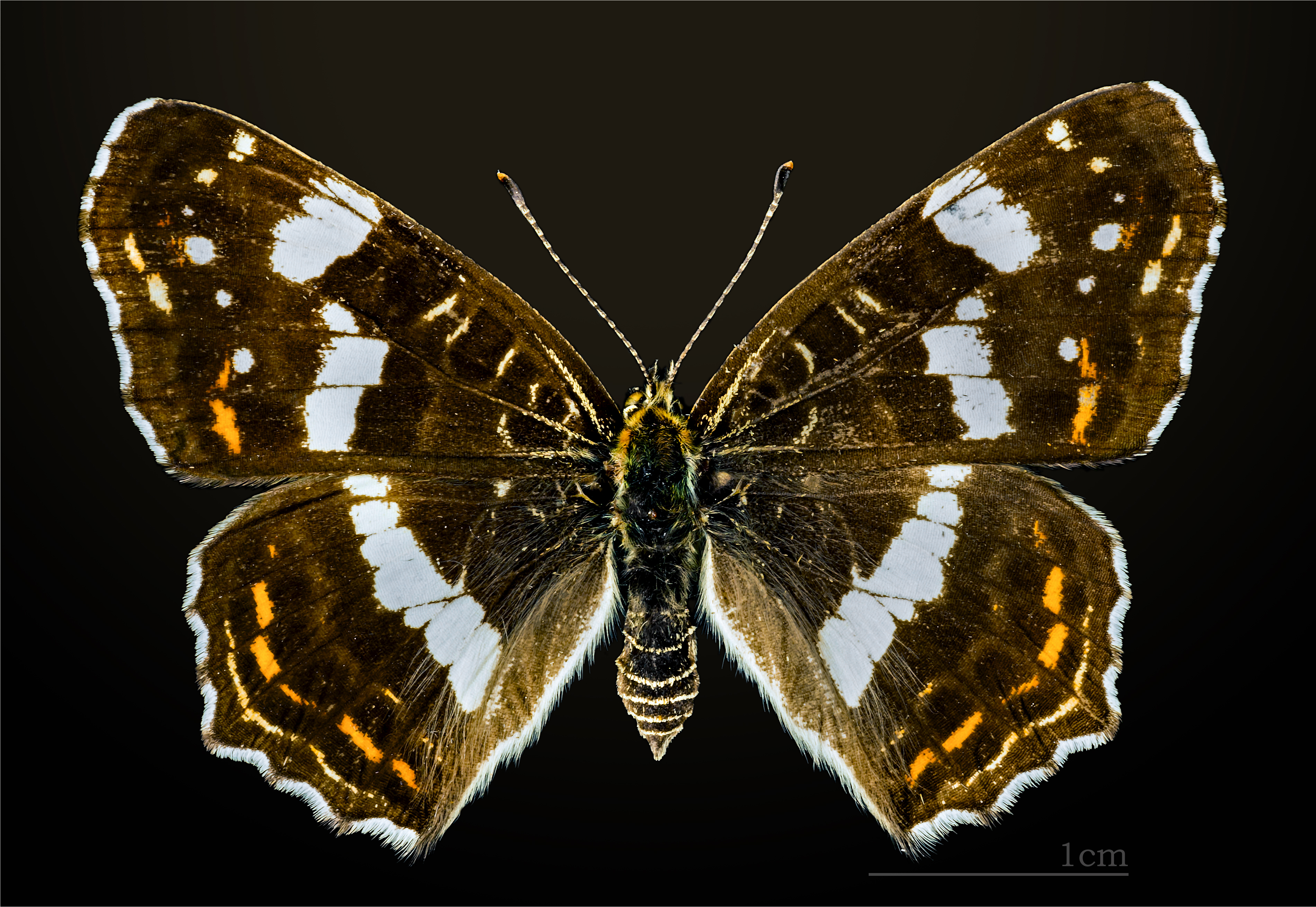
Form prorsa

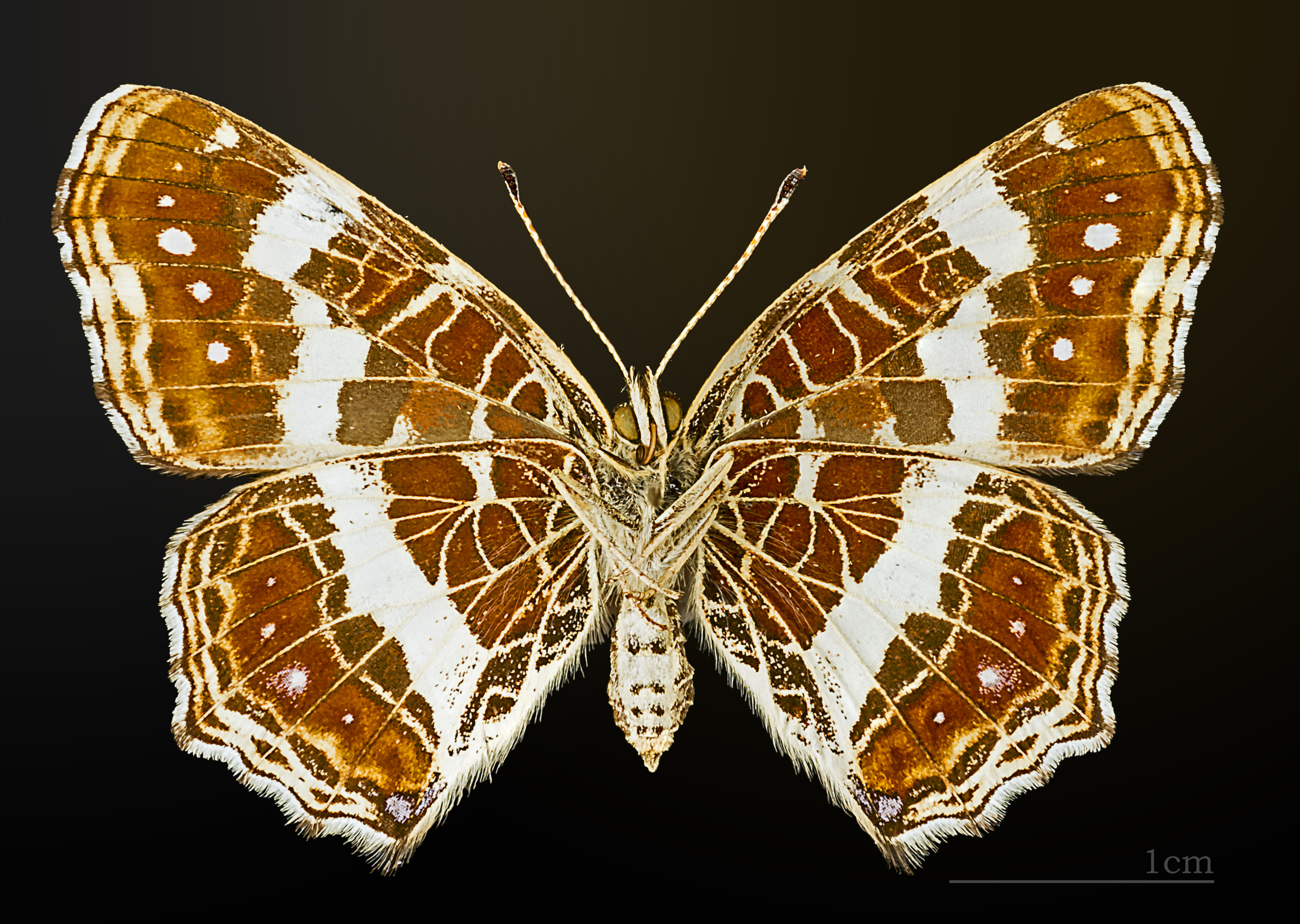
Form prorsa underside
