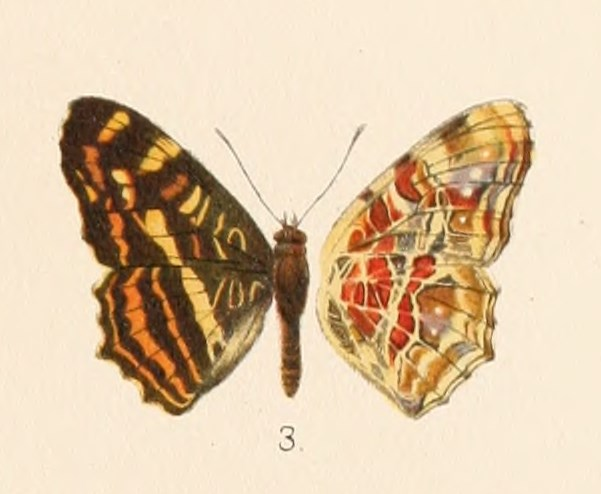
- Araschnia prorsoides

Scientific classification
- Domain: Eukaryota
- Kingdom: Animalia
- Phylum: Arthropoda
- Class: Insecta
- Order: Lepidoptera
- Family: Nymphalidae
- Genus: Araschnia
- Species: A. prorsoides

Binomial name
- Araschnia prorsoides (Blanchard, 1871)

= Araschnia prorsoides =

Species of butterfly

Araschnia prorsoides is a butterfly found in the East Palearctic (North India, Himalayas, West China, Manipur - North Burma) that belongs to the browns family.

== Description from Seitz ==
A. prorsoides Blanch. (64f) resembles fallax [Araschnia fallax Janson, 1877 is a summer form of Araschnia burejana) on the upperside, but is recognizable by the different position of the outer costal spots of the forewing, the markings in the distal area, and the 3 almost parallel stripes resp.bands of the hindwing. In ab. levanoides Blanch. (64d) all the markings are reddish brown and partly more prominent but narrower; corresponds nearly to strigosa. West China, ? Japan (Oiwake); also in North India:Naga Hills. In ab. flavida Oberth. the pale markings are very much extended; the forewing bears in and below the cell large yellowish patches, the posterior spot of the costal halfband is prolonged into a streak;the hindwing brownish and whitish from the base to the submarginal band, only the basal area bearing still some dark spots; the distal margin dark brown, the inner edge of this band arcuate and near the same a row of dark spots on the light-coloured portion of the wing. The underside is whitish for the greater part, both wings bearing some dark-edged brownish spots in the basal area and indistinct yellowish and blackish shadows and stripes in the middle and outer areas. From Siaolu.
