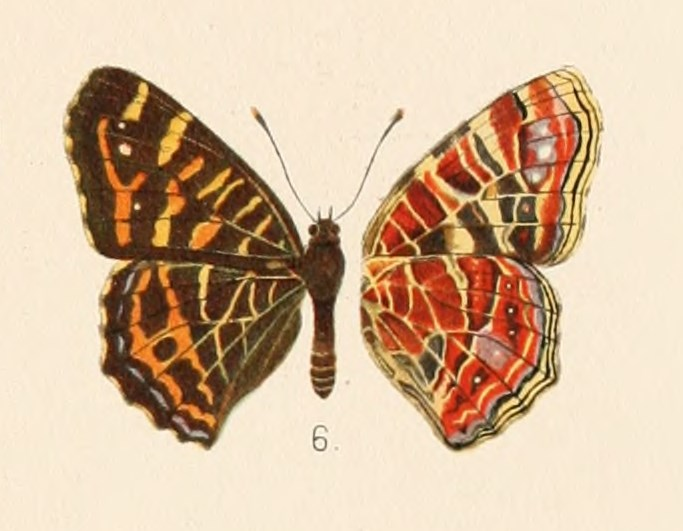

Scientific classification
- Domain: Eukaryota
- Kingdom: Animalia
- Phylum: Arthropoda
- Class: Insecta
- Order: Lepidoptera
- Family: Nymphalidae
- Genus: Araschnia
- Species: A. davidis

Binomial name
- Araschnia davidis Poujade, 1885

= Araschnia davidis =

Species of butterfly

Araschnia davidis is a butterfly found in the Palearctic that belongs to the browns family. It is endemic to Tibet, West and Central China.

== Description from Seitz ==
A. davidis Pouj. has on the forewing reddish yellow irregular transverse bands and lines on a black-brown ground, placed as in the next form [oreas Leech], but broader. The hindwing bears in the outer half a broad reddish brown band, in whose centre there is a round black spot, other black spots, irregularly shaped, being situated before and behind this spot; the basal area is traversed by several reddish brown lines. The underside is reddish brown, variegated with black, the veins being pale, especially on the hindwing, the bands as above but paler, in the distal area of the forewing some whitish spots on a violet ground and in the distal area of the hindwing a row of black-edged white dots, of which the central one is less distinct, being situated on a bluish areas, smear; at the distal margin 3 black lines on a light ground. East Tibet: Moupin.

== Etymology ==
The name honours Armand David.
