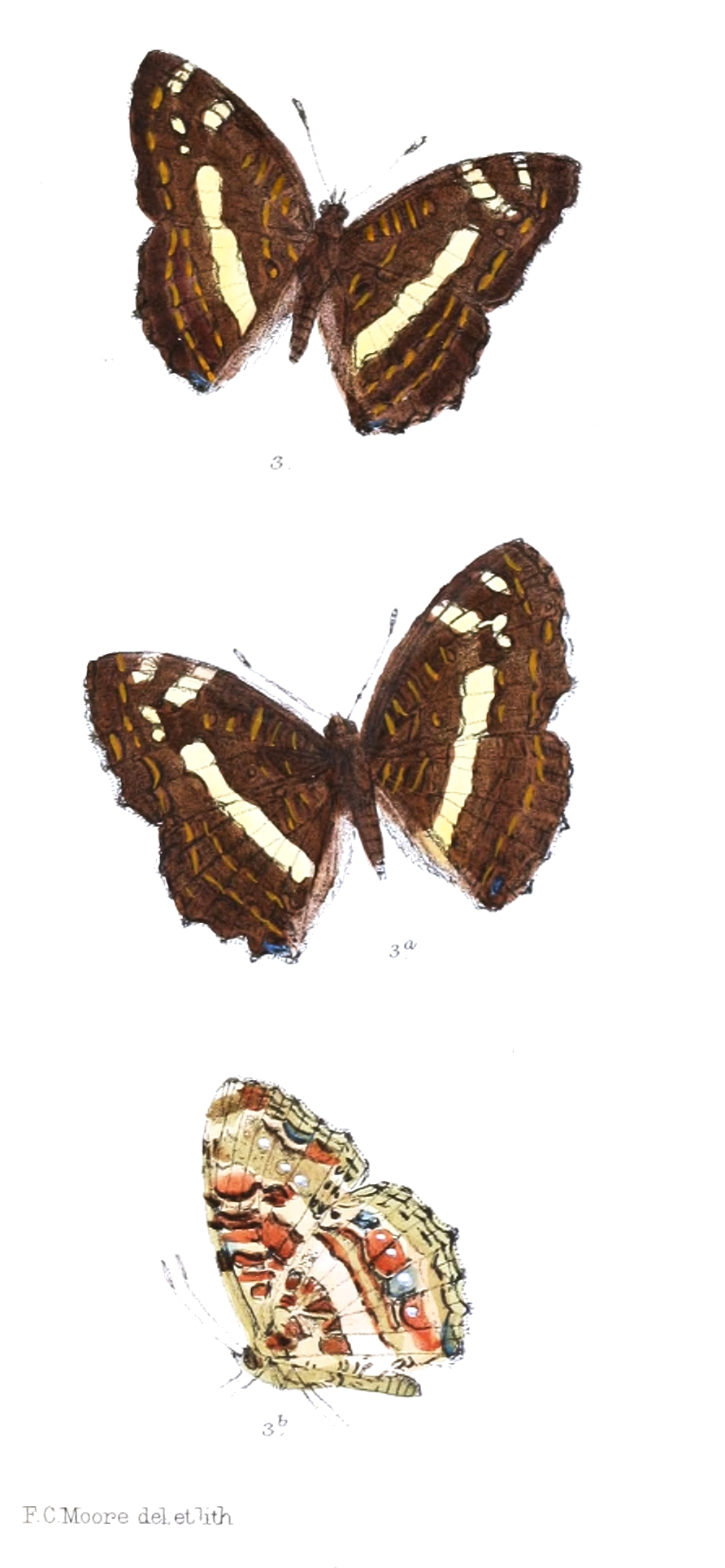
- Male, female and male underside
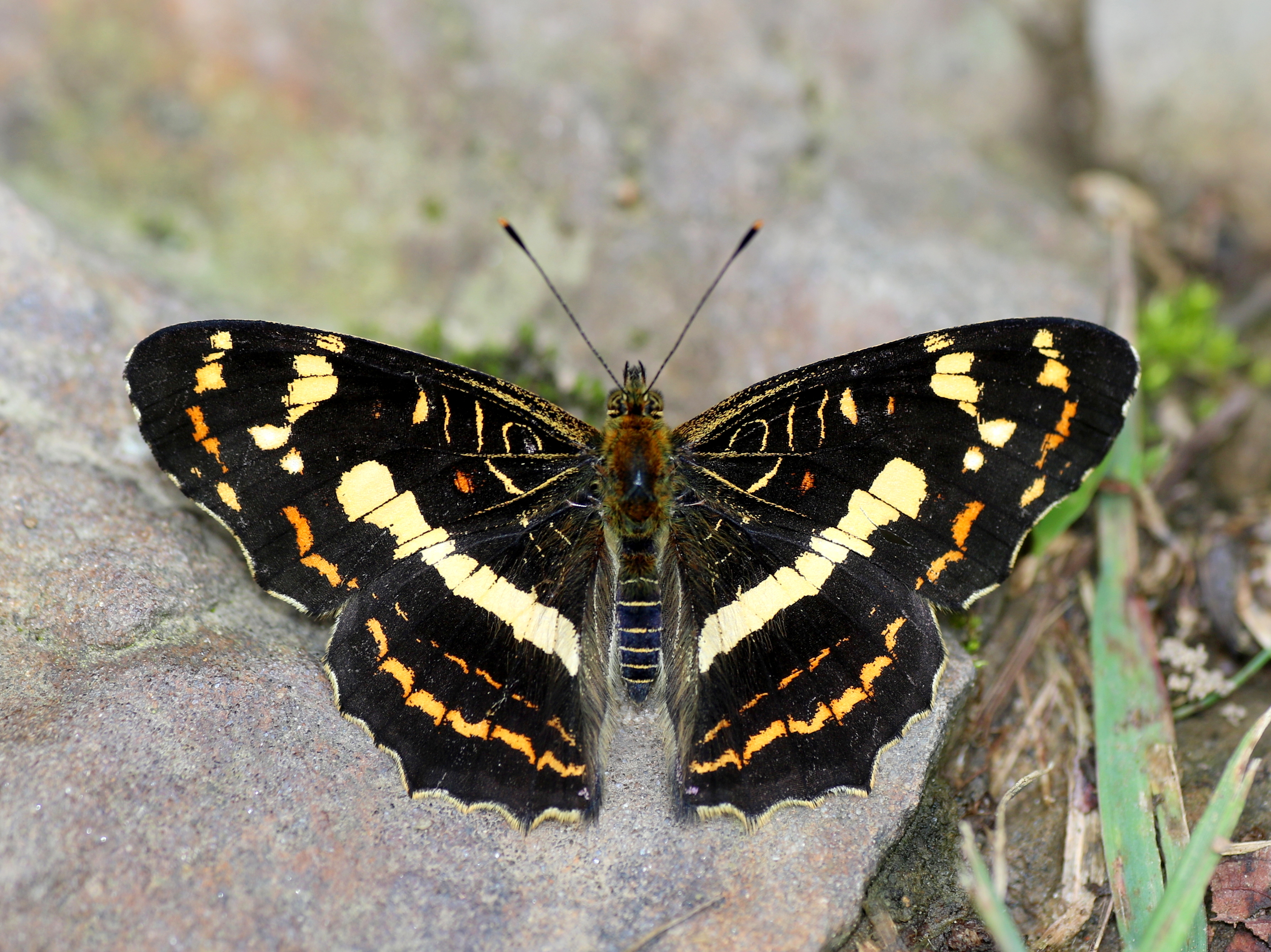

Scientific classification
- Kingdom: Animalia
- Phylum: Arthropoda
- Clade: Pancrustacea
- Class: Insecta
- Order: Lepidoptera
- Family: Nymphalidae
- Genus: Araschnia
- Species: A. dohertyi

Binomial name
- Araschnia dohertyi Moore, 1899

= Araschnia dohertyi =

Species of butterfly

Araschnia dohertyi is a butterfly of the family Nymphalidae found in parts of Asia, including northern Burma and China (Yunnan).
