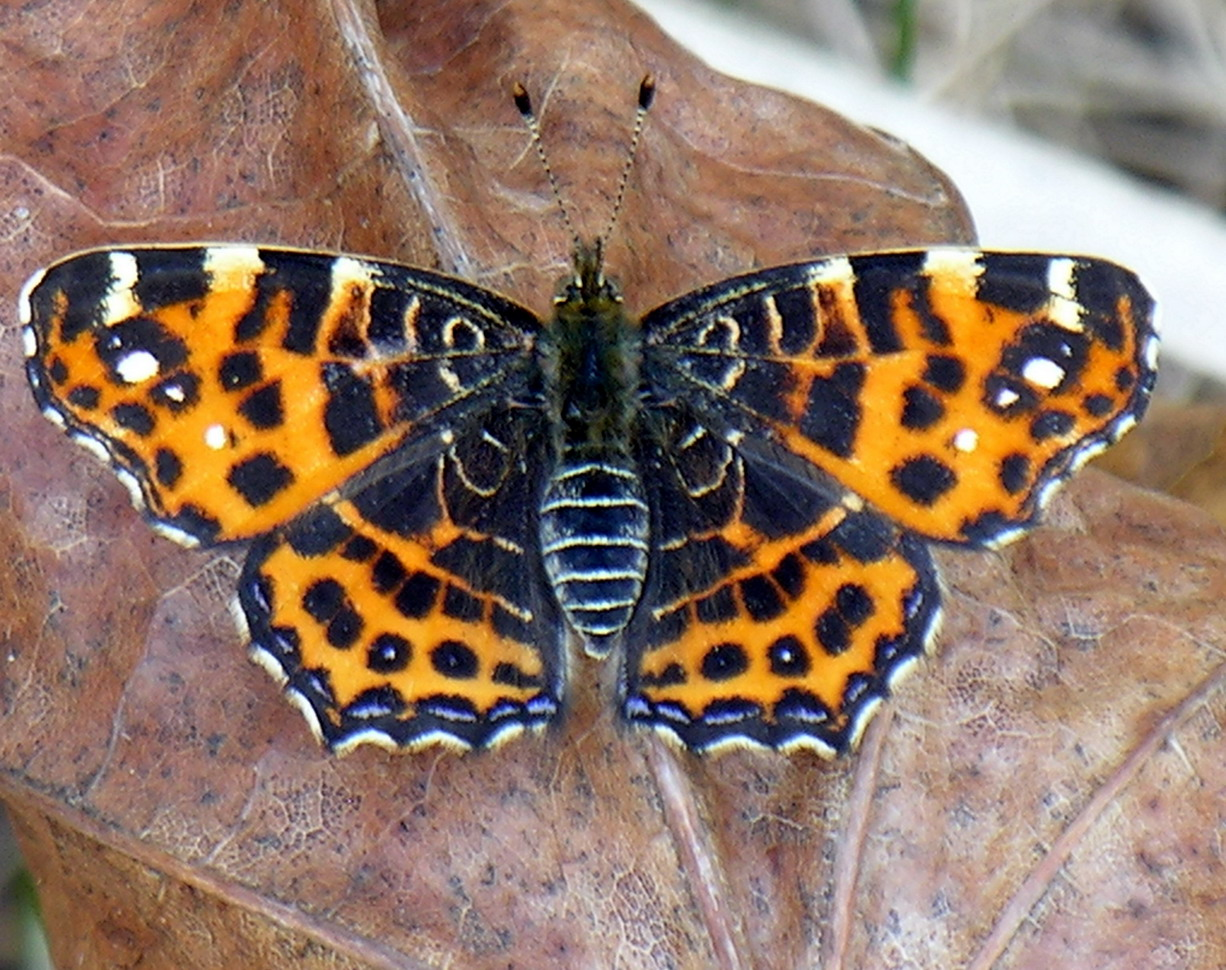
- Araschnia levana in the spring

Scientific classification
- Domain: Eukaryota
- Kingdom: Animalia
- Phylum: Arthropoda
- Class: Insecta
- Order: Lepidoptera
- Family: Nymphalidae
- Tribe: Nymphalini
- Genus: Araschnia; Hübner, 1819

Synonyms
- Arachnia Wheeler, 1903

= Araschnia =

Genus of butterflies

Araschnia is a genus of the family Nymphalidae found in the East Palearctic (temperate Asia). The seasonal polyphenism (difference between spring and summer forms) is very marked.

== Species ==
In alphabetical order:

- Araschnia burejana (Bremer, 1861)
- Araschnia davidis Poujade, 1885
- Araschnia dohertyi Moore, 1899
- Araschnia doris Leech, 1893
- Araschnia levana (Linnaeus, 1758) – map
- Araschnia oreas Leech, 1892
- Araschnia prorsoides (Blanchard, 1871) – Mongol
- Araschnia zhangi Chou, 1994
