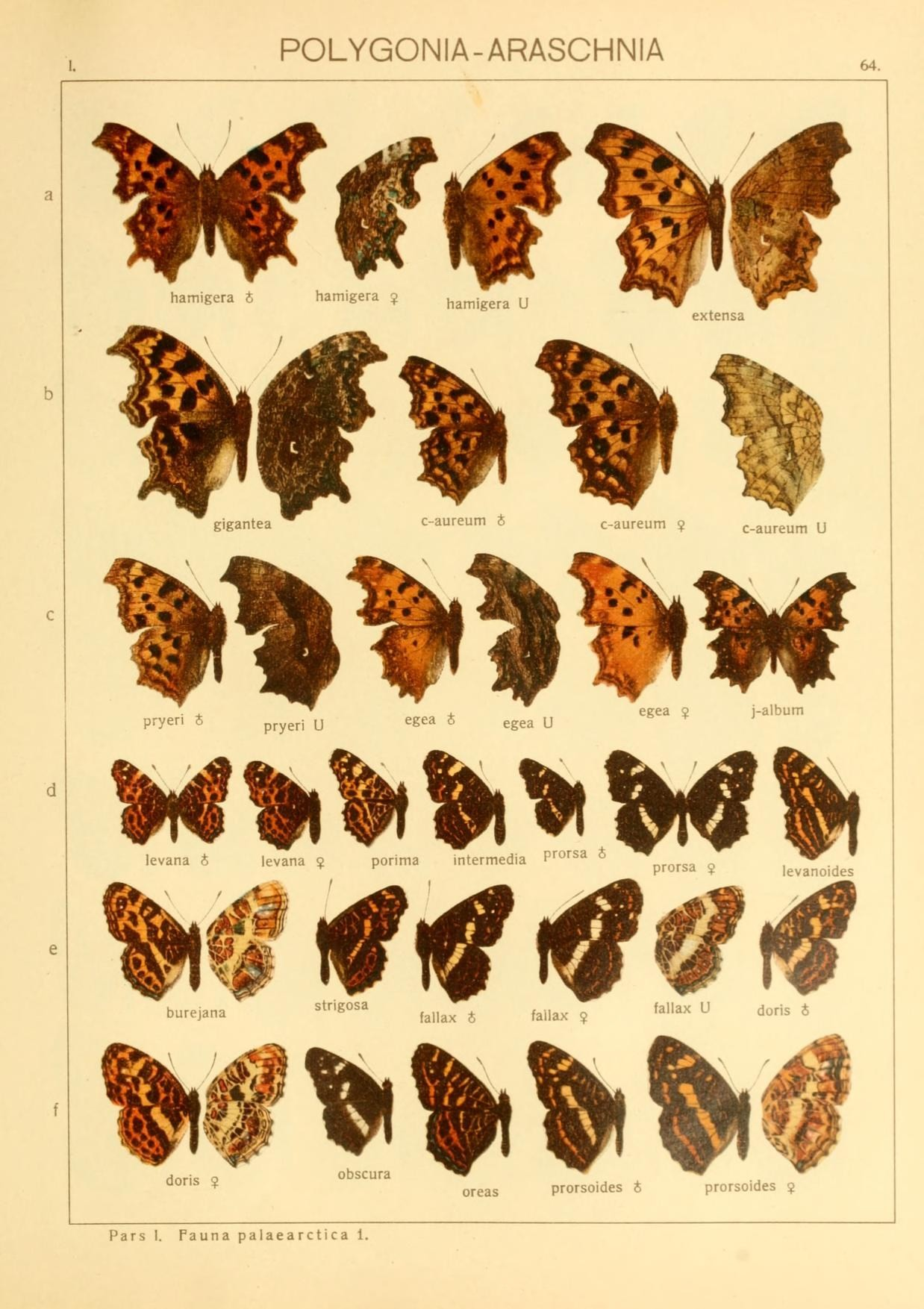
- Araschnia doris in Seitz (64f)

Scientific classification
- Domain: Eukaryota
- Kingdom: Animalia
- Phylum: Arthropoda
- Class: Insecta
- Order: Lepidoptera
- Family: Nymphalidae
- Genus: Araschnia
- Species: A. oreas

Binomial name
- Araschnia oreas Leech, [1892]

= Araschnia oreas =

Species of butterfly

Araschnia oreas is a butterfly found in the Palearctic that belongs to the browns family. It is endemic to East Tibet and West China

== Description from Seitz ==
oreas Leech (64f) is perhaps only a seasonal form of the preceding [Araschnia davidis], with narrower bands and lines, which have partly a yellowish tint; near the edge of the hindwing a row of blue elongate spots. The underside more brightly marked, the ground colour being almost red. West China: Wa-ssu-kow, Chow-pin-sa, Pu-tsu-fong.
