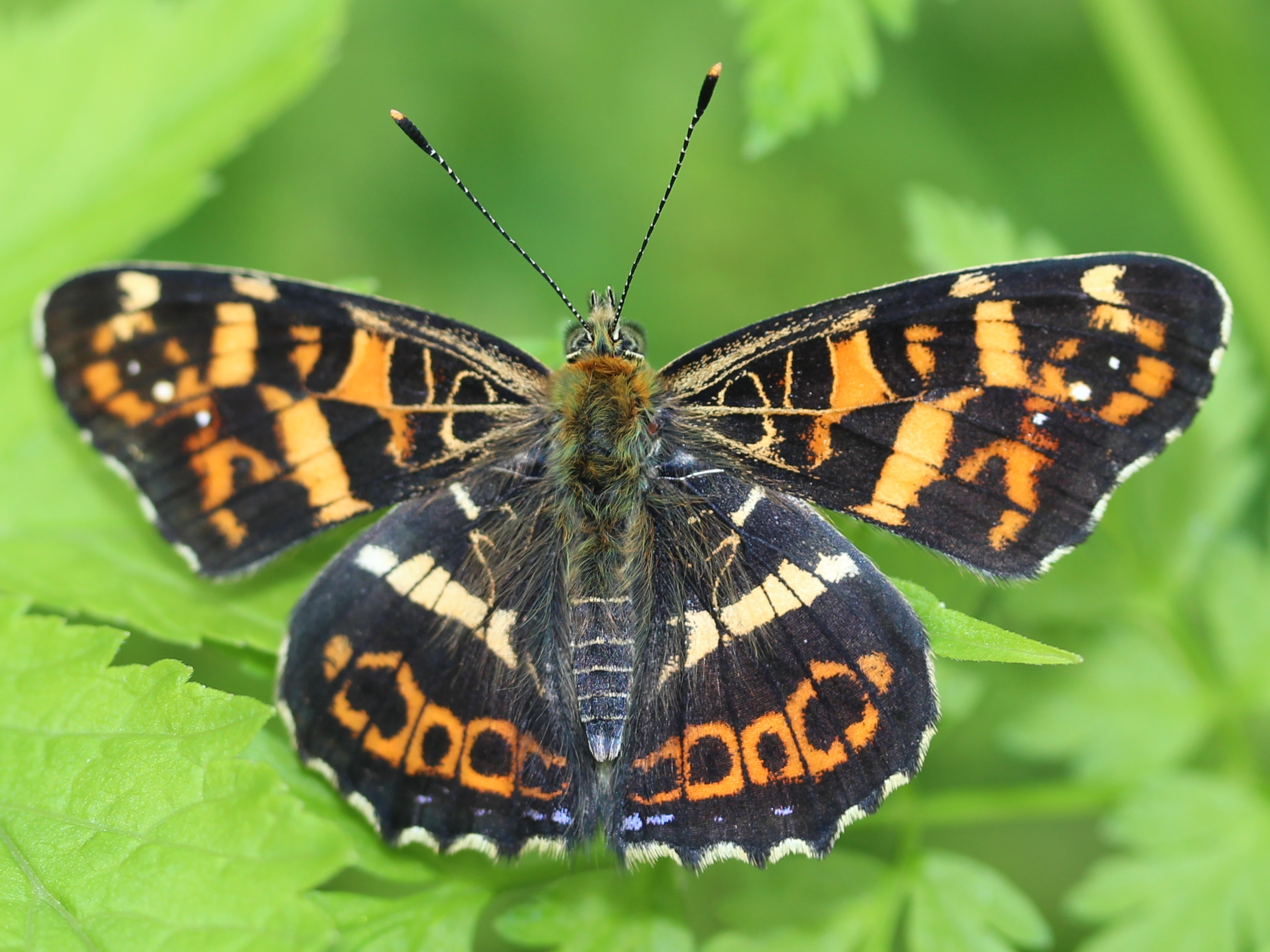
- Araschnia burejana strigosa

Scientific classification
- Domain: Eukaryota
- Kingdom: Animalia
- Phylum: Arthropoda
- Class: Insecta
- Order: Lepidoptera
- Family: Nymphalidae
- Genus: Araschnia
- Species: A. burejana

Binomial name
- Araschnia burejana (Bremer, 1861)

Synonyms
- Araschnia kurilicola Bryk, 1942; Araschnia fallax Janson, 1877 (summer form)

= Araschnia burejana =

Species of butterfly

Araschnia burejana, the large map, is a butterfly of the family Nymphalidae. It is found in Tibet, China, the Amur and Ussuri regions of Russia, Korea and Japan.

It occurs in mixed forest up to 1,300 meters. Adults are on wing from May to June and from July to August in two generations per year.

The larvae feed on Urtica species.

== Subspecies ==
- Araschnia burejana burejana
- Araschnia burejana chinensis Oberthür
- Araschnia burejana leechi Oberthür
- Araschnia burejana strigosa

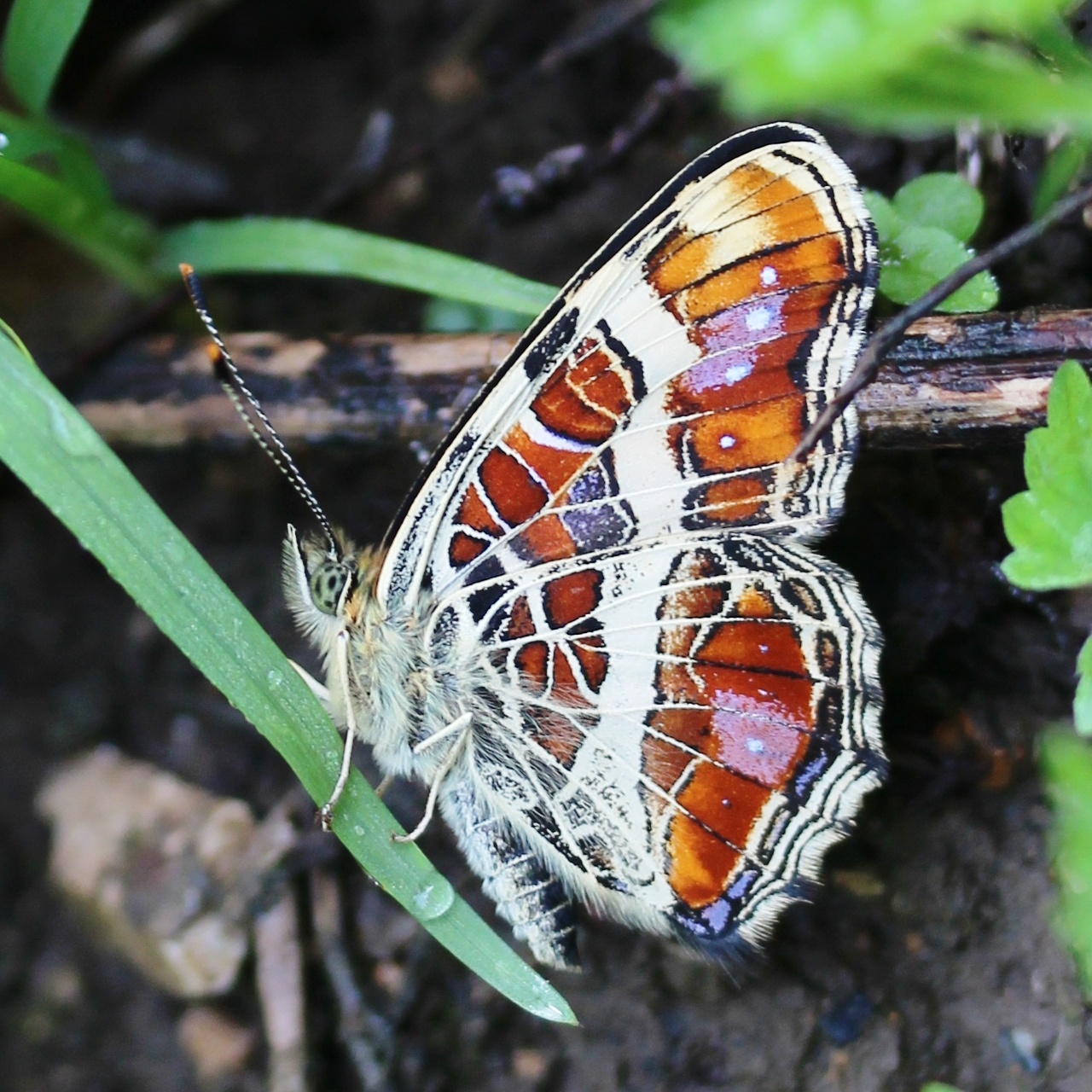
Araschnia burejana strigosa
