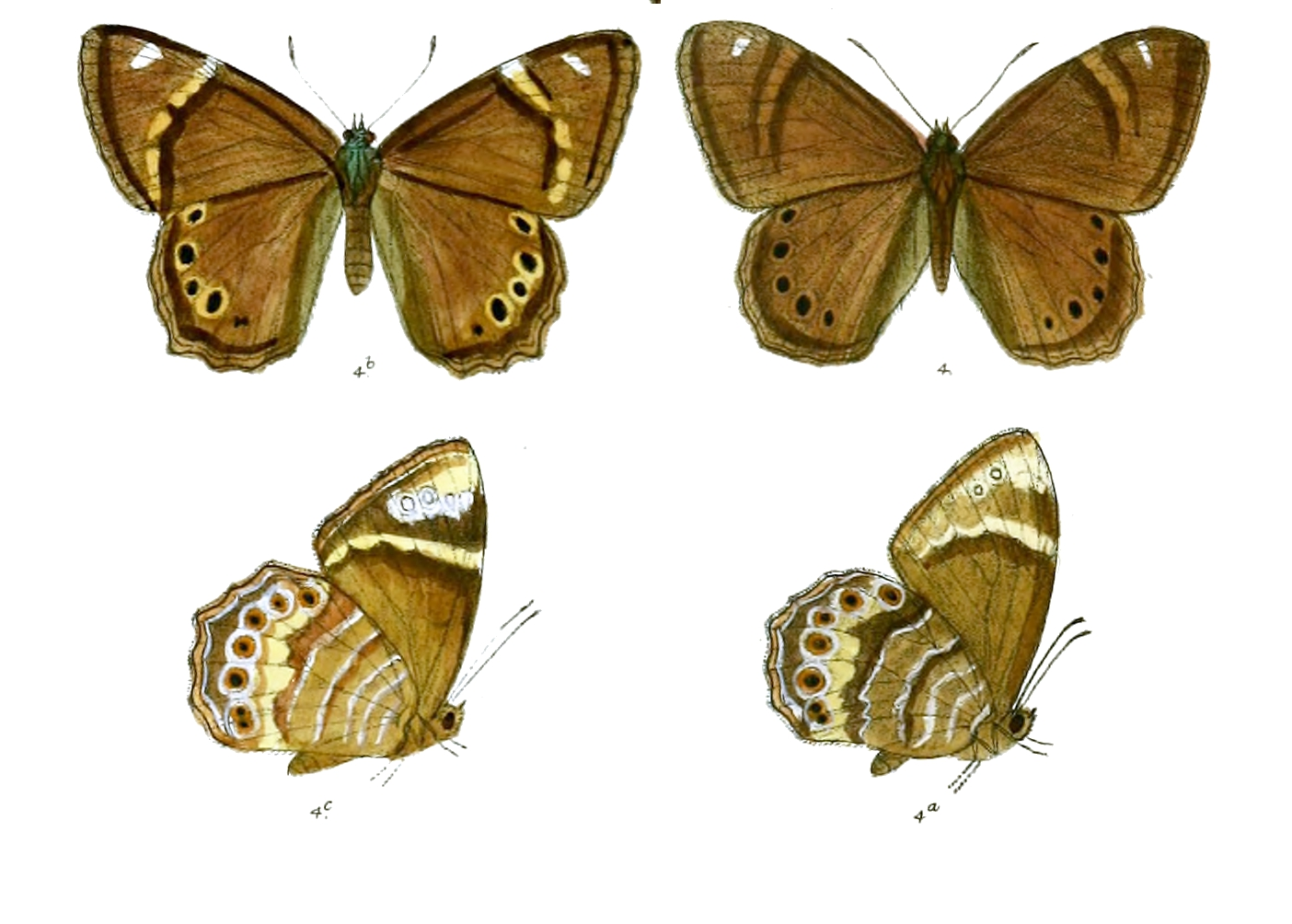
- Lethe nicetas in Lepidoptera Indica

Scientific classification
- Domain: Eukaryota
- Kingdom: Animalia
- Phylum: Arthropoda
- Class: Insecta
- Order: Lepidoptera
- Family: Nymphalidae
- Genus: Lethe
- Species: L. nicetas

Binomial name
- Lethe nicetas (Hewitson, 1863)

= Lethe nicetas =

Yellow woodbrown

Species of butterfly

Lethe nicetas , the yellow woodbrown, is a species of Satyrinae butterfly found in the Indomalayan realm (Sikkim, Assam, Manipur)
