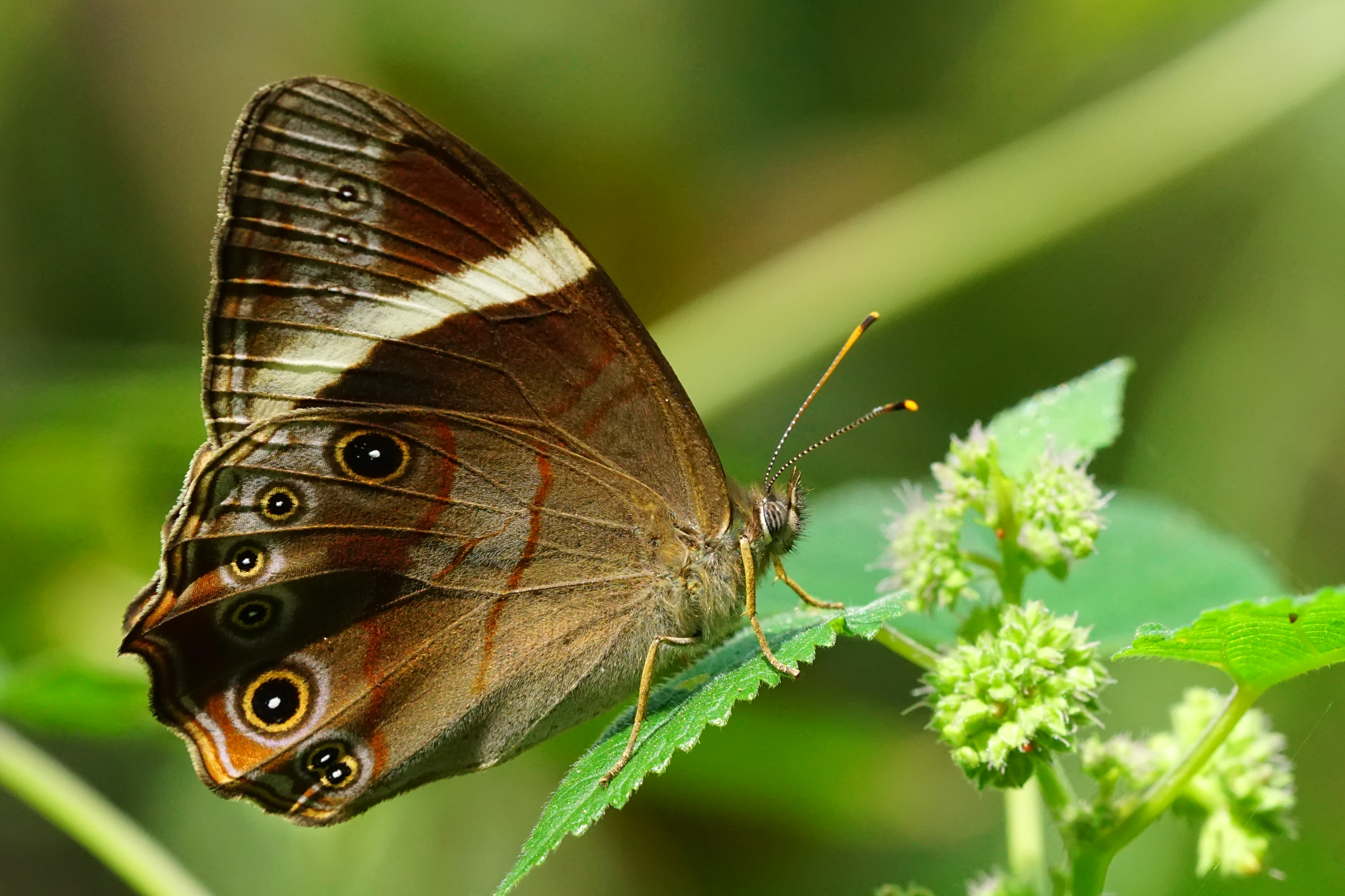
- Lethe insana formosana

Scientific classification
- Domain: Eukaryota
- Kingdom: Animalia
- Phylum: Arthropoda
- Class: Insecta
- Order: Lepidoptera
- Family: Nymphalidae
- Genus: Lethe
- Species: L. insana

Binomial name
- Lethe insana Kollar, [1844]

= Lethe insana =

Common forester

Species of butterfly

Lethe insana, the common forester, is a species of Satyrinae butterfly found in the Indomalayan realm The larva feeds on Arundinaria falcata

== Subspecies ==
- L. i. insana Northwest India, Bhutan, Sikkim, Nepal, Assam to Indo China
- L. i. procris Leech, 1891 Thailand, Laos, Vietnam
- L. i. formosana Fruhstorfer, 1908 Taiwan
- L. i. brisanda de Nicéville, 1886 Bhutan, Assam, Northeast Burma
- L. i. baucis Leech, 1891 West China, Central China
