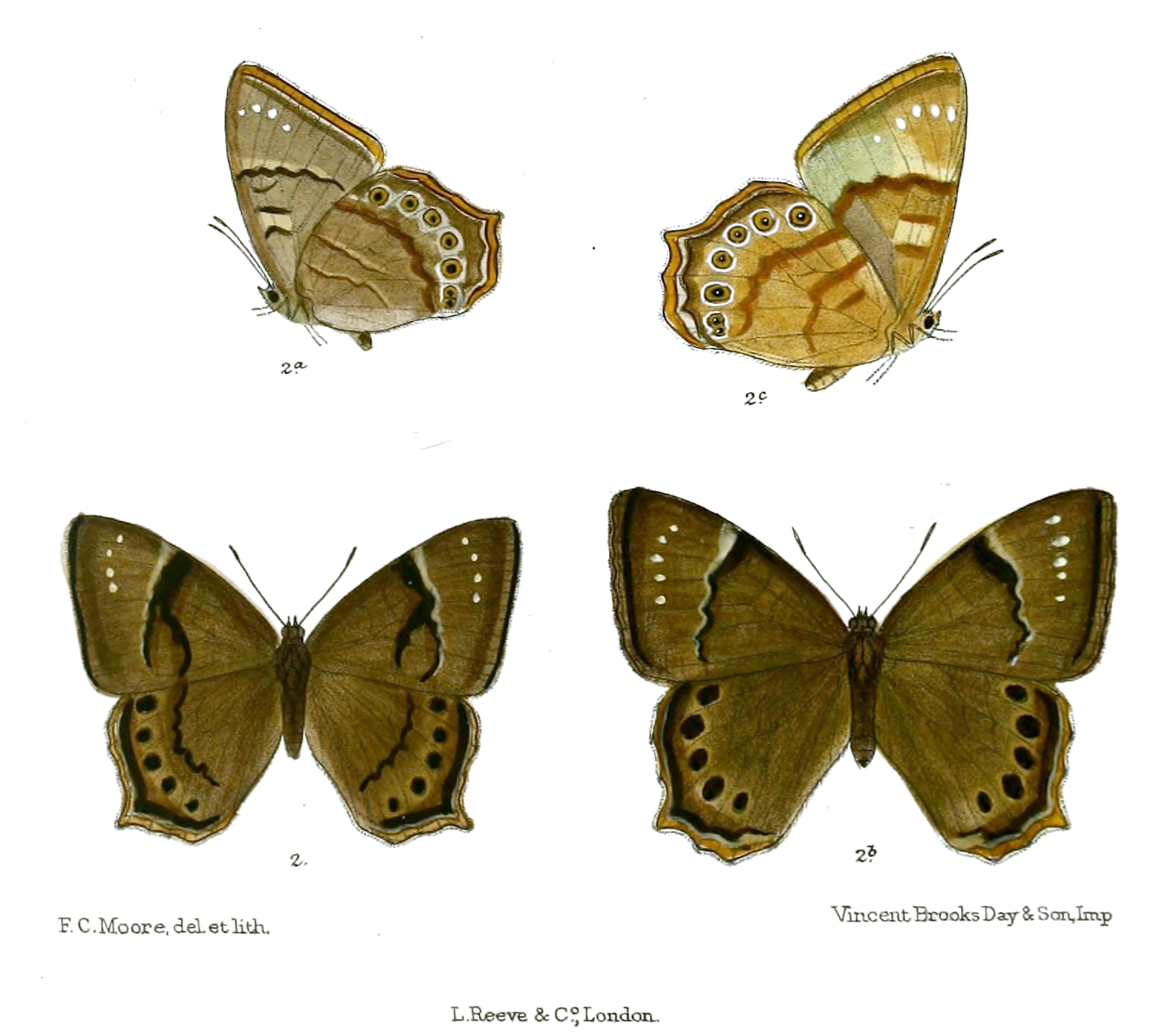
- Lethe tristigmata in Lepidoptera Indica

Scientific classification
- Domain: Eukaryota
- Kingdom: Animalia
- Phylum: Arthropoda
- Class: Insecta
- Order: Lepidoptera
- Family: Nymphalidae
- Genus: Lethe
- Species: L. tristigmata

Binomial name
- Lethe tristigmata Elwes, 1887

= Lethe tristigmata =

Spotted mystic

Species of butterfly

Lethe tristigmata, the spotted mystic, is a species of Satyrinae butterfly found in the Indomalayan realm (Sikkim, Nepal) . In 2015, it was also recorded from Neora Valley National Park in West Bengal, India.
