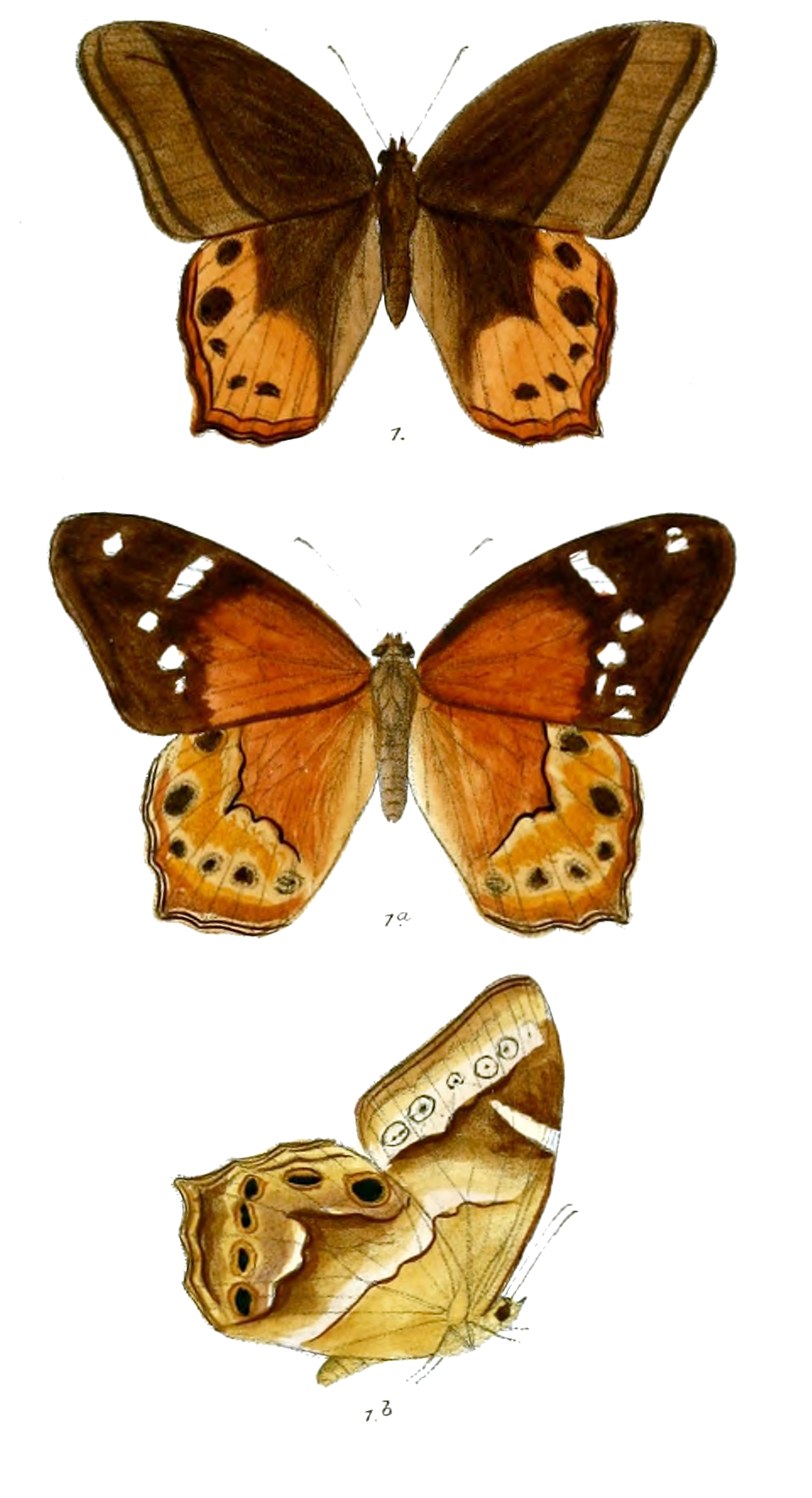

Scientific classification
- Domain: Eukaryota
- Kingdom: Animalia
- Phylum: Arthropoda
- Class: Insecta
- Order: Lepidoptera
- Family: Nymphalidae
- Genus: Lethe
- Species: L. distans

Binomial name
- Lethe distans Butler, 1870

= Lethe distans =

Scarce Red Forester

Species of butterfly

Lethe distans , the scarce red forester, is a species of Satyrinae butterfly found in the Indomalayan realm where it is found in Bhutan, Sikkim, Assam to Burma and Thailand
