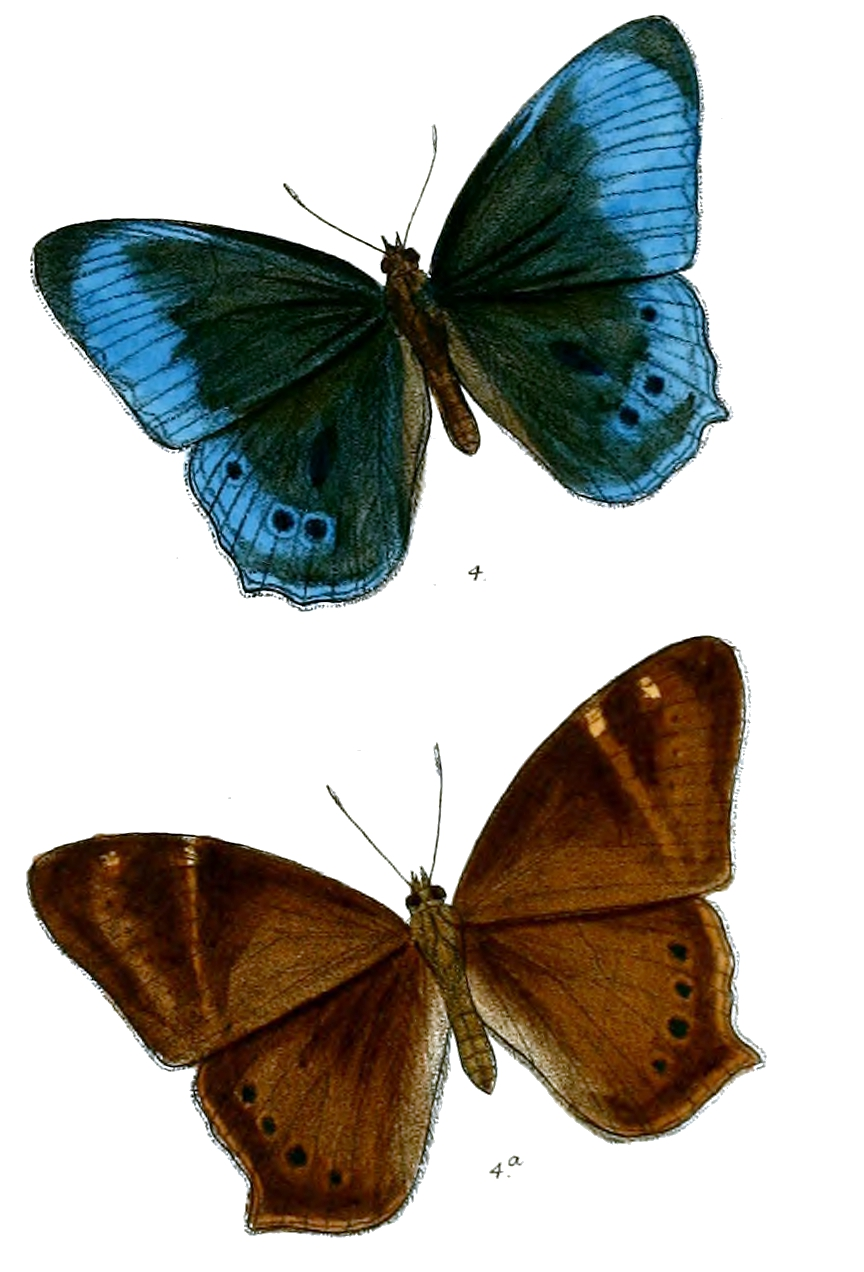
- Upperside of male (above) and female

Scientific classification
- Domain: Eukaryota
- Kingdom: Animalia
- Phylum: Arthropoda
- Class: Insecta
- Order: Lepidoptera
- Family: Nymphalidae
- Genus: Lethe
- Species: L. scanda

Binomial name
- Lethe scanda (Moore, 1857)

Synonyms
- Zophoessa dirphia; Debis nada

= Lethe scanda =

Blue forester

Species of butterfly

Lethe scanda, the blue forester, is a species of satyrine butterfly found in parts of Asia. It is known from Sikkim and Bhutan.

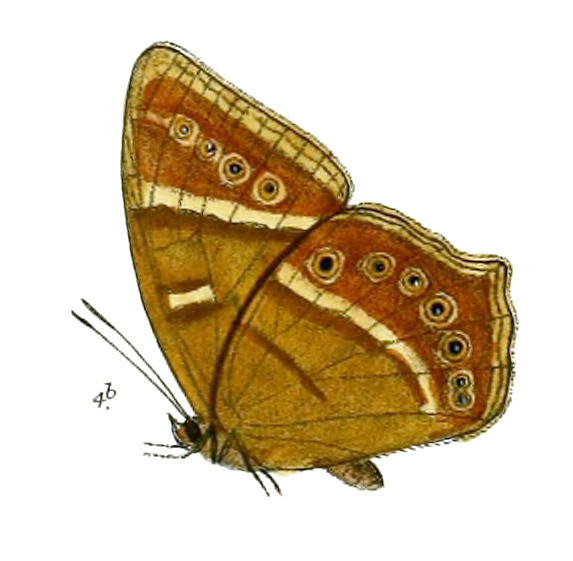
Underside

This butterfly has a 2.5 to 2.6 inches (6.4 to 6.6 cm) wingspan. The male is a deep indigo blue on the upperside with the margins being paler. The females are darker brown with yellow subapical marks. Males have a tuft of black hairs on the second vein where it meets the median vein.
