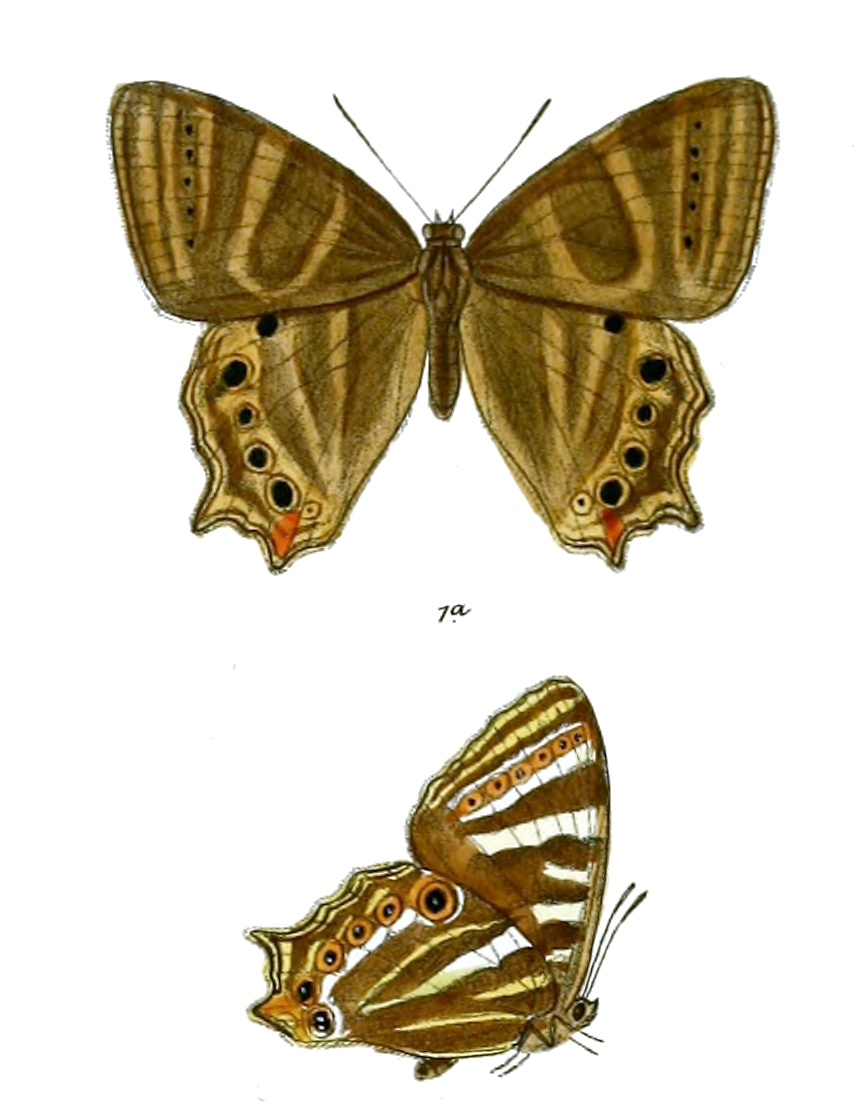
- In Lepidoptera Indica

Scientific classification
- Kingdom: Animalia
- Phylum: Arthropoda
- Class: Insecta
- Order: Lepidoptera
- Family: Nymphalidae
- Genus: Lethe
- Species: L. baladeva

Binomial name
- Lethe baladeva (Moore, 1866)

= Lethe baladeva =

Species of butterfly

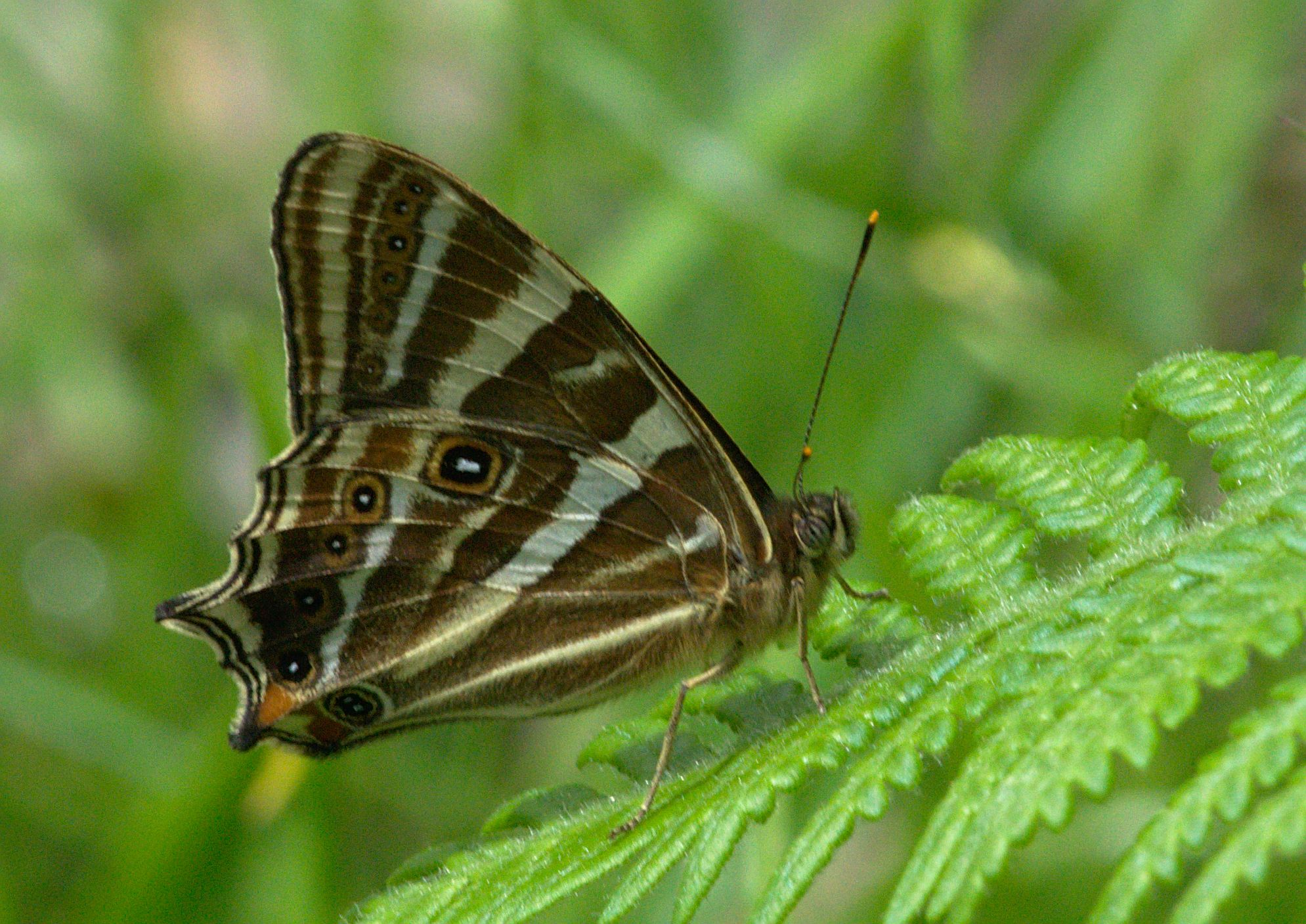
At 2200 metres elevation in Sarmoli Village, Uttarakhand

Lethe baladeva, the treble silverstripe, is a Satyrinae butterfly found in the Indomalayan realm (Uttarakhand and east to Sikkim, Bhutan and Assam). The species was first described by Frederic Moore in 1866.

== Description ==
Lethe baladeva reaches 50–77 mm in size.

It is a fast flier and quick to settle in the undergrowth and on clumps of bamboo. It flies between April and October from an elevation of 1500 up to 2700 metres in the Himalayas.

== Distribution ==
In India it is found from Uttarakhand east to Sikkim. It is an uncommon butterfly but is locally resident in habitats.

== Conservation status ==
Lethe baladeva is classified as a Schedule II species as per the Indian Wildlife (Protection) Act, 1972.
