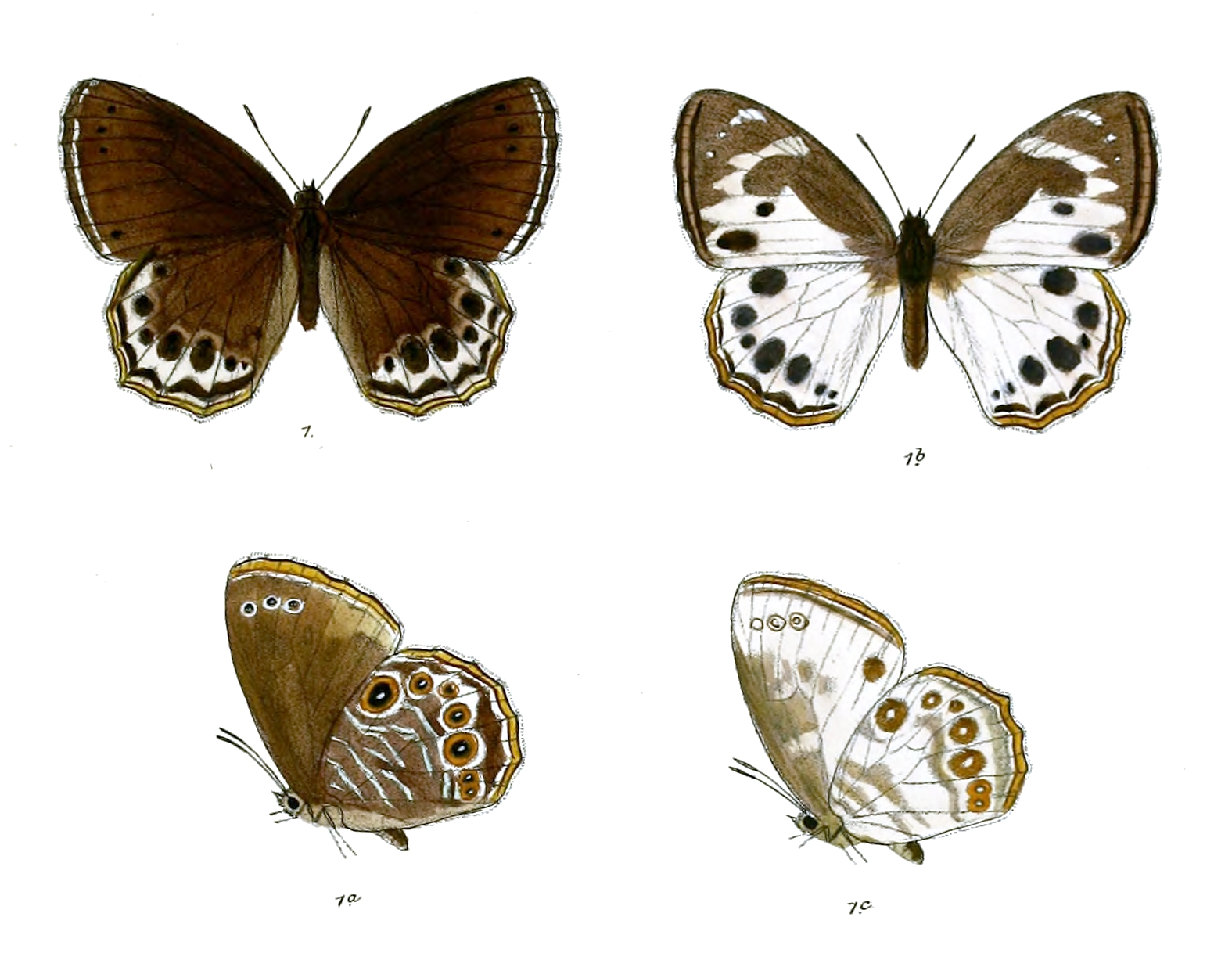

Scientific classification
- Kingdom: Animalia
- Phylum: Arthropoda
- Class: Insecta
- Order: Lepidoptera
- Family: Nymphalidae
- Genus: Lethe
- Species: L. visrava

Binomial name
- Lethe visrava (Moore, [1866]))

Synonyms
- Debis visrava Moore, [1866]

= Lethe visrava =

Species of butterfly

Lethe visrava, the white-edged woodbrown, is a species of satyrine butterfly found in Asia, where it is known from north-eastern India (Sikkim, Assam) to Bhutan and Burma.
