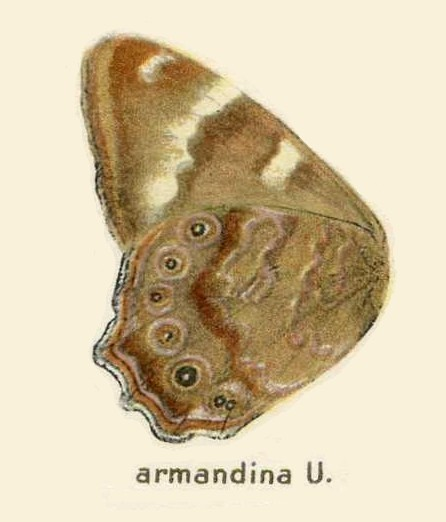
- From Adalbert Seitz

Scientific classification
- Domain: Eukaryota
- Kingdom: Animalia
- Phylum: Arthropoda
- Class: Insecta
- Order: Lepidoptera
- Family: Nymphalidae
- Genus: Lethe
- Species: L. armandina

Binomial name
- Lethe armandina (Oberthür, 1881)

= Lethe armandina =

Chinese labyrinth

Species of butterfly

Lethe armandina, the Chinese labyrinth, is a species of Satyrinae butterfly found in western China, Assam and Burma.
