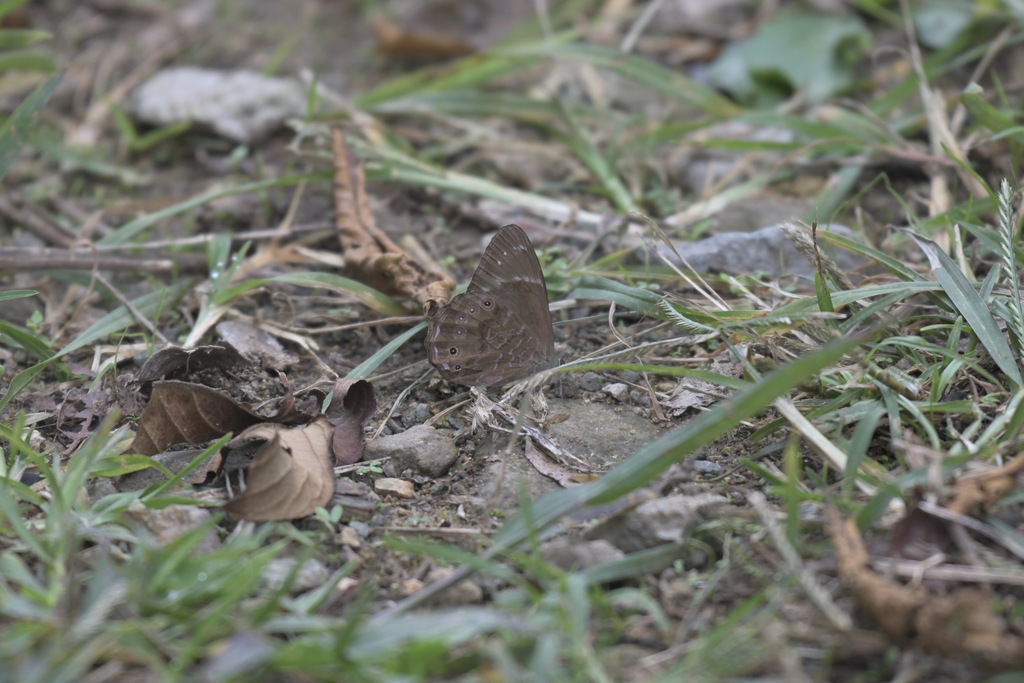

Scientific classification
- Kingdom: Animalia
- Phylum: Arthropoda
- Class: Insecta
- Order: Lepidoptera
- Family: Nymphalidae
- Genus: Lethe
- Species: L. violaceopicta

Binomial name
- Lethe violaceopicta (Poujade, 1884)

= Lethe violaceopicta =

Manipur woodbrown

Species of butterfly

Lethe violaceopicta, the Manipur woodbrown, is a species of Satyrinae butterfly found in the Indomalayan realm (Tibet, West China (Sichuan, Guizhou), Manipur).
