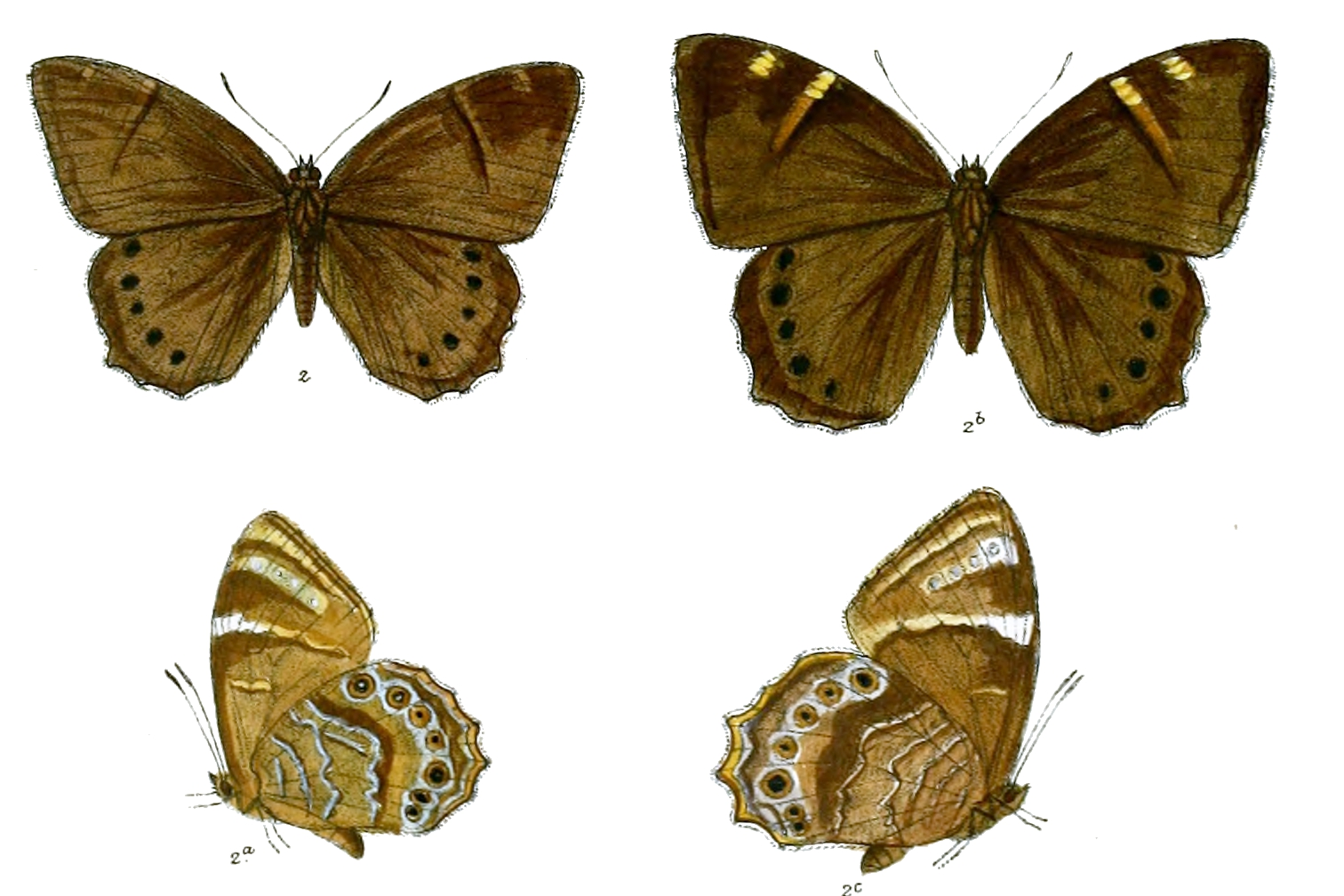
- Lethe sidonis in Lepidoptera Indica

Scientific classification
- Kingdom: Animalia
- Phylum: Arthropoda
- Class: Insecta
- Order: Lepidoptera
- Family: Nymphalidae
- Genus: Lethe
- Species: L. sidonis

Binomial name
- Lethe sidonis (Hewitson, 1863)

= Lethe sidonis =

Common woodbrown

Species of butterfly

Lethe sidonis, the common woodbrown, is a species of Satyrinae butterfly found in the Indomalayan realm (Tibet, Kulu to Sikkim Eastern Himalayas India North-East India, South Shan States).
