= Lethe kabrua =

Manipur goldenfork

Scientific classification
- Kingdom: Animalia
- Phylum: Arthropoda
- Class: Insecta
- Order: Lepidoptera
- Family: Nymphalidae
- Genus: Lethe
- Species: L. kabrua

Binomial name
- Lethe kabrua Tytler, 1914

Species of butterfly

Lethe kabrua, the Manipur goldenfork, is a species of Satyrinae butterfly found in the Indomalayan realm where it is endemic to Manipur.
