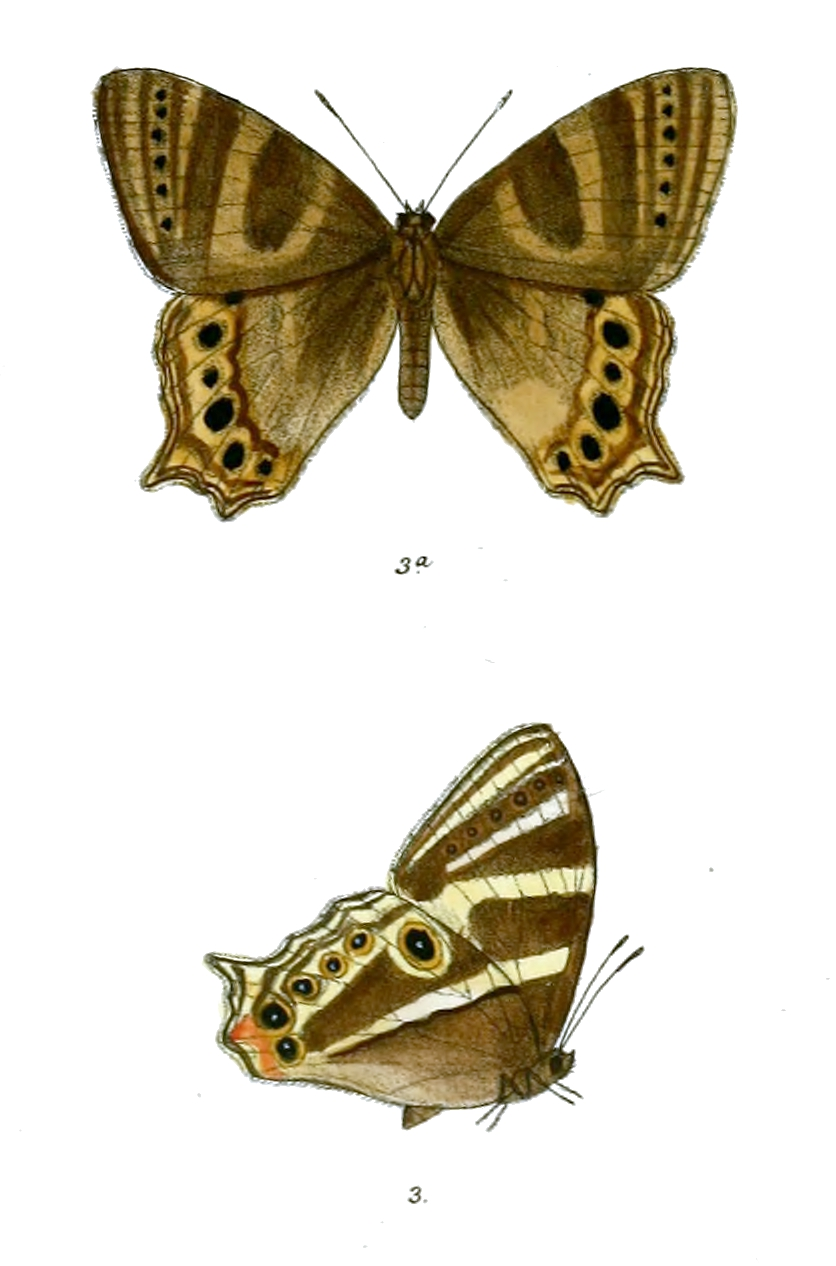
- Lethe ramadeva in Lepidoptera Indica

Scientific classification
- Domain: Eukaryota
- Kingdom: Animalia
- Phylum: Arthropoda
- Class: Insecta
- Order: Lepidoptera
- Family: Nymphalidae
- Genus: Lethe
- Species: L. ramadeva

Binomial name
- Lethe ramadeva (de Nicéville, 1887)

= Lethe ramadeva =

Single silverstripe

Species of butterfly

Lethe ramadeva, the single silverstripe, is a species of Satyrinae butterfly found in the Indomalayan realm (Sikkim, Bhutan, Yunnan).
