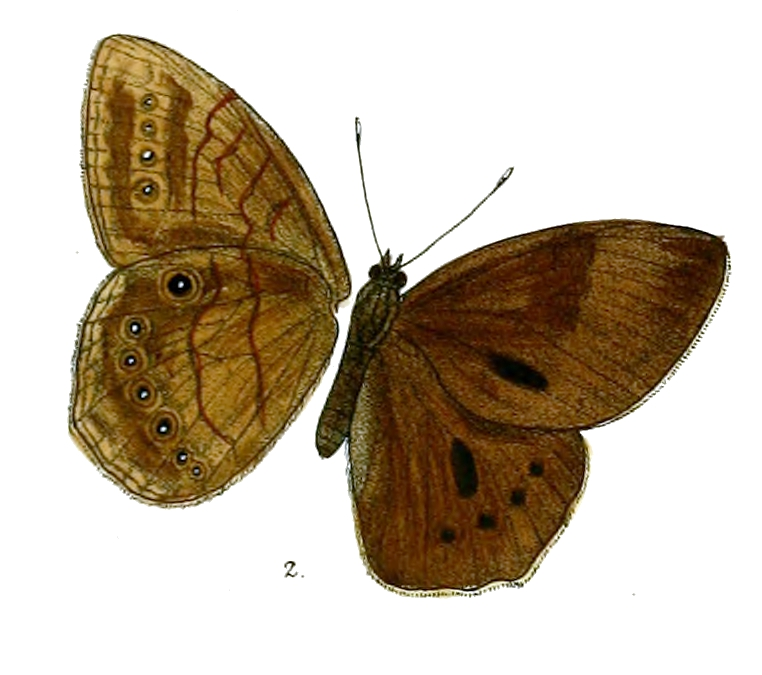
- Lethe gulnihal in Lepidoptera Indica

Scientific classification
- Kingdom: Animalia
- Phylum: Arthropoda
- Clade: Pancrustacea
- Class: Insecta
- Order: Lepidoptera
- Family: Nymphalidae
- Genus: Lethe
- Species: L. gulnihal

Binomial name
- Lethe gulnihal de Nicéville, 1887

= Lethe gulnihal =

Dull forester

Species of butterfly

Lethe gulnihal , the dull forester, is a species of Satyrinae butterfly found in the Indomalayan realm

== Subspecies ==
- L. g. gulnihal Bhutan to Assam, North Burma
- L. g. peguana (Moore, [1891]) South Burma, Thailand
