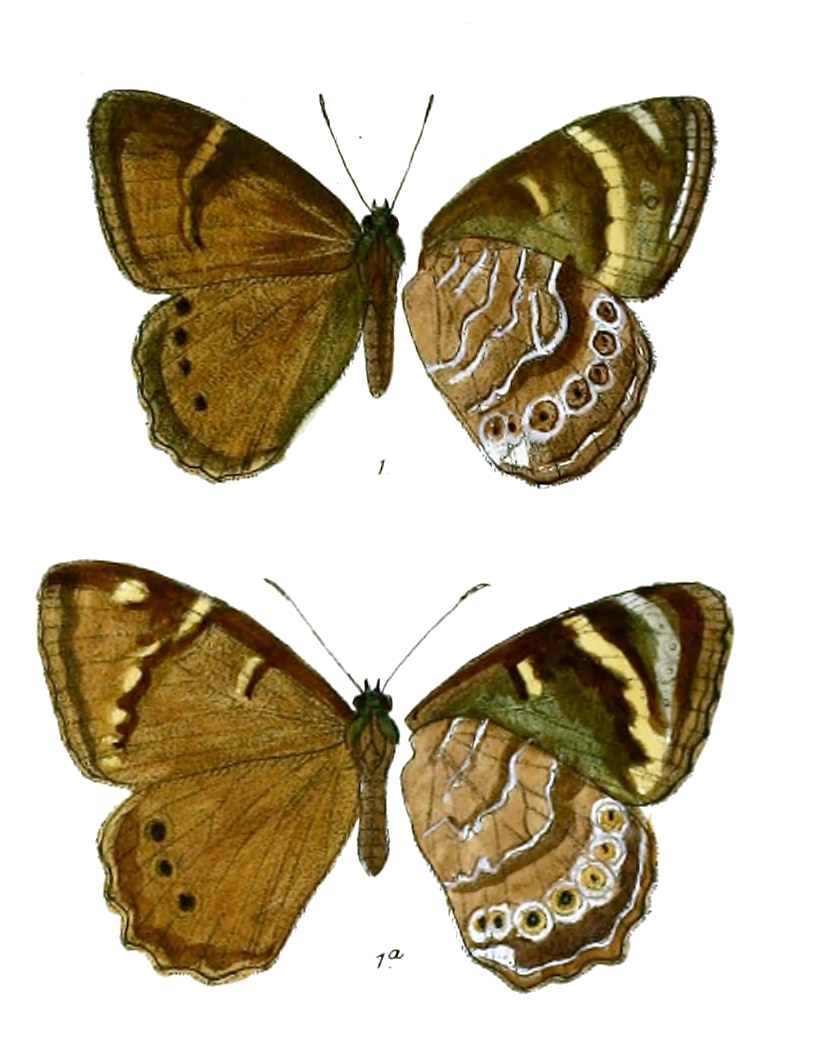
- Lethe maitrya in Lepidoptera Indica

Scientific classification
- Domain: Eukaryota
- Kingdom: Animalia
- Phylum: Arthropoda
- Class: Insecta
- Order: Lepidoptera
- Family: Nymphalidae
- Genus: Lethe
- Species: L. maitrya

Binomial name
- Lethe maitrya de Nicéville, 1880

= Lethe maitrya =

Barred woodbrown

Species of butterfly

Lethe maitrya, the barred woodbrown, is a species of Satyrinae butterfly found in the Indomalayan realm.

== Subspecies ==
- L. m. maitrya West Himalayas, Nepal, Sikkim, Bhutan
- L. m. thawgawa Tytler, 1939 Burma
- L. m. metokana Huang, 1998 Tibet
- L. m. lijiangensis Huang, 2001 Yunnan
