= Lethe gemina =

Tytler's treebrown
- Lethe gemina in Leech Butterflies from China, Japan, and Corea fig. 8 male

Scientific classification
- Kingdom: Animalia
- Phylum: Arthropoda
- Clade: Pancrustacea
- Class: Insecta
- Order: Lepidoptera
- Family: Nymphalidae
- Genus: Lethe
- Species: L. gemina

Binomial name
- Lethe gemina Leech, 1891

Species of butterfly

Lethe gemina, Tytler's treebrown, is a species of Satyrinae butterfly found in the Indomalayan realm (West China, Naga Hills and, as subspecies zaitha Fruhstorfer, 1914, Taiwan)
