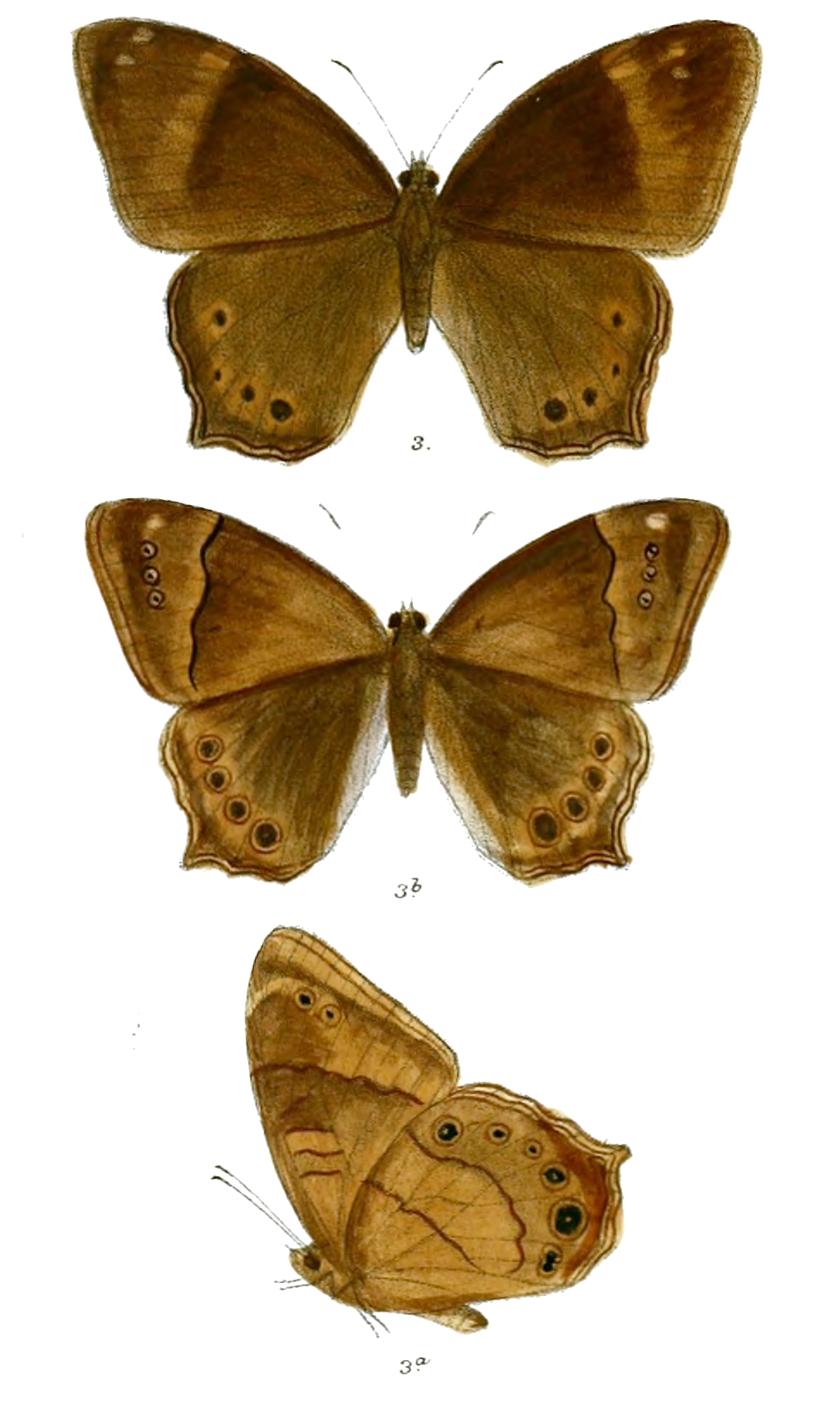
- Lethe serbonis in Lepidoptera Indica

Scientific classification
- Kingdom: Animalia
- Phylum: Arthropoda
- Clade: Pancrustacea
- Class: Insecta
- Order: Lepidoptera
- Family: Nymphalidae
- Genus: Lethe
- Species: L. serbonis

Binomial name
- Lethe serbonis Hewitson, 1876

= Lethe serbonis =

Lethe serbonis 80 3.jpg

Species of butterfly

Lethe serbonis , the brown forester, is a species of Satyrinae butterfly found in the Indomalayan realm (Bhutan, Sikkim, Assam, Burma, West China)
