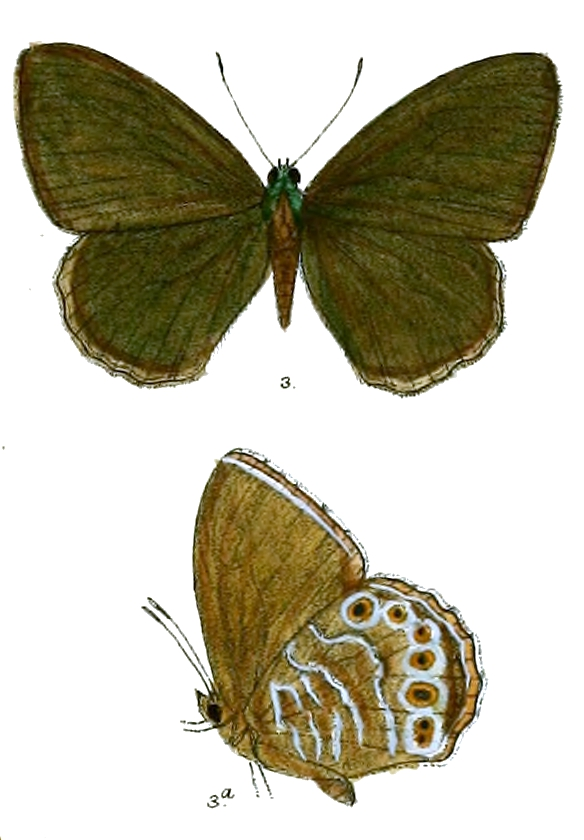
- In Lepidoptera Indica

Scientific classification
- Domain: Eukaryota
- Kingdom: Animalia
- Phylum: Arthropoda
- Class: Insecta
- Order: Lepidoptera
- Family: Nymphalidae
- Genus: Lethe
- Species: L. siderea

Binomial name
- Lethe siderea Marshall, 1880

= Lethe siderea =

Scarce woodbrown

Species of butterfly

Lethe siderea , the scarce woodbrown, is a species of Satyrinae butterfly found in the Indomalayan realm. The species was first described by George Frederick Leycester Marshall in 1880. It is legally protected in India under Schedule II of the Wild Life (Protection) Act, 1972.

== Subspecies ==
- L. s. siderea Sikkim to West China
- L. s. kanoi Esaki & Nomura, 1937 Formosa
