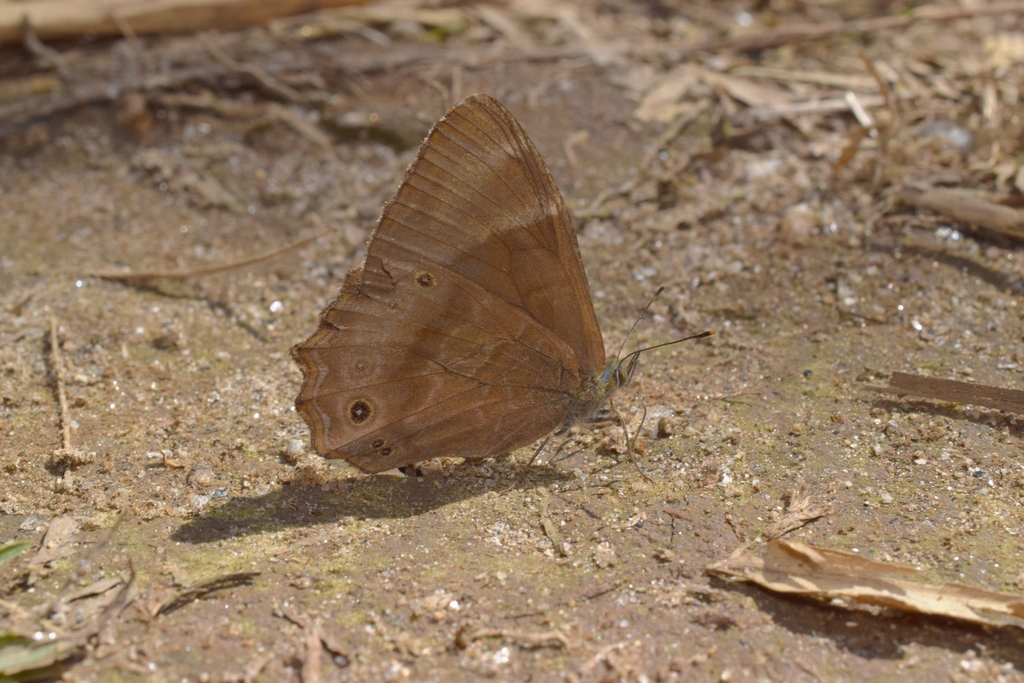

Scientific classification
- Domain: Eukaryota
- Kingdom: Animalia
- Phylum: Arthropoda
- Class: Insecta
- Order: Lepidoptera
- Family: Nymphalidae
- Genus: Lethe
- Species: L. dakwania

Binomial name
- Lethe dakwania Tytler, 1939

= Lethe dakwania =

Species of butterfly

Lethe dakwania is a species of Satyrinae butterfly found in the Indomalayan realm ( North India, Kashmir).
