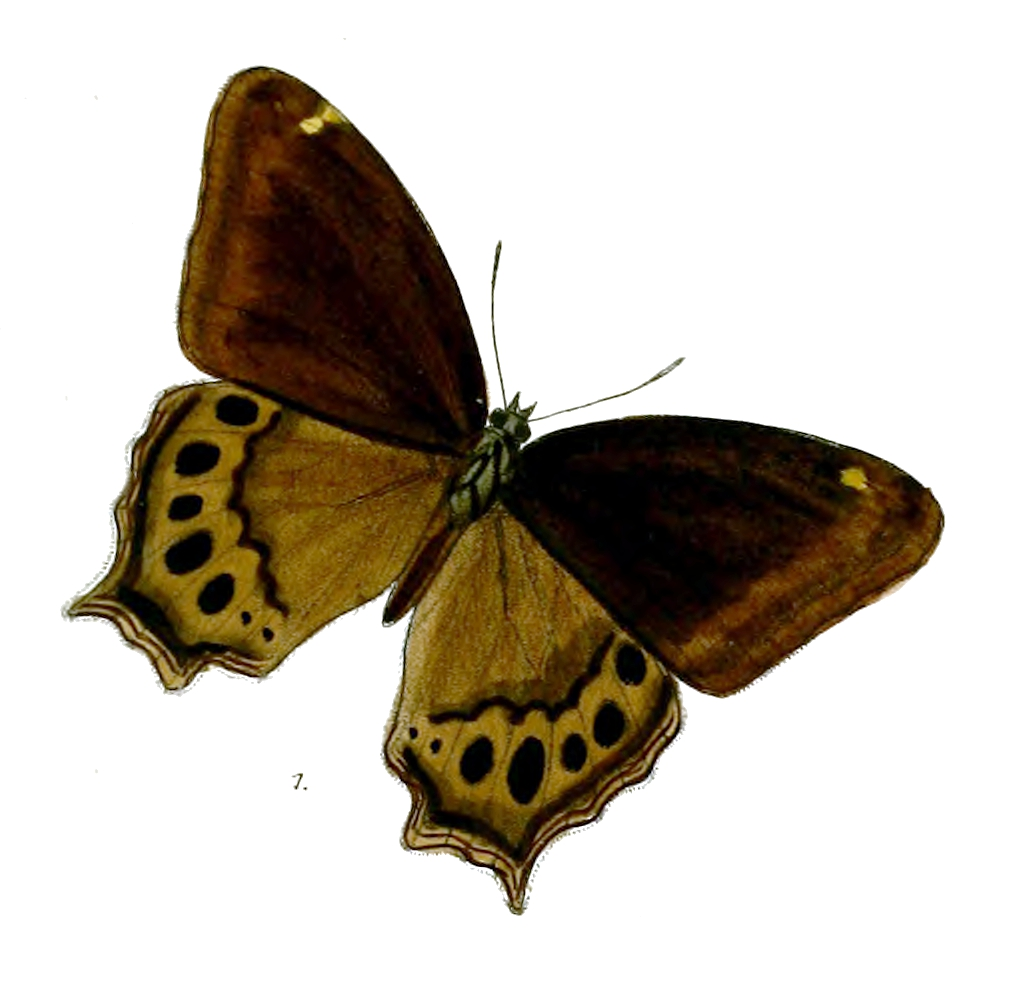

Scientific classification
- Domain: Eukaryota
- Kingdom: Animalia
- Phylum: Arthropoda
- Class: Insecta
- Order: Lepidoptera
- Family: Nymphalidae
- Genus: Lethe
- Species: L. sura

Binomial name
- Lethe sura (Doubleday, 1848)

Synonyms
- Zophoessa sura Doubleday, [1849]; Zophoessa sura Westwood, [1851]

= Lethe sura =

Species of butterfly

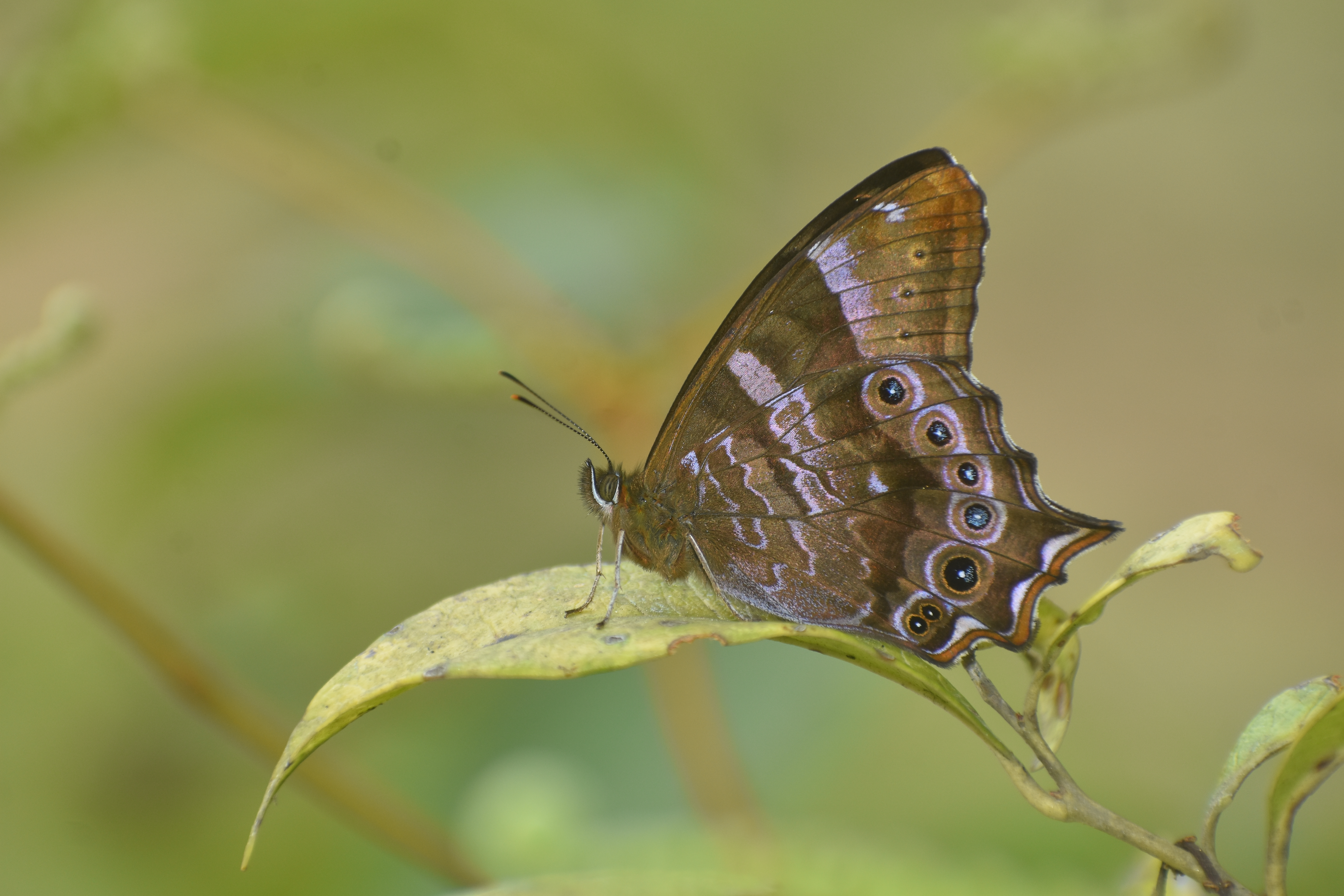
Close wing basking position of Lethe sura (Doubleday, -1849-) - Lilacfork

Lethe sura, the lilacfork, is a species of nymphalid butterfly found along the eastern Himalayas from Sikkim in India to northern Burma. It is also found in Southeast Asia
