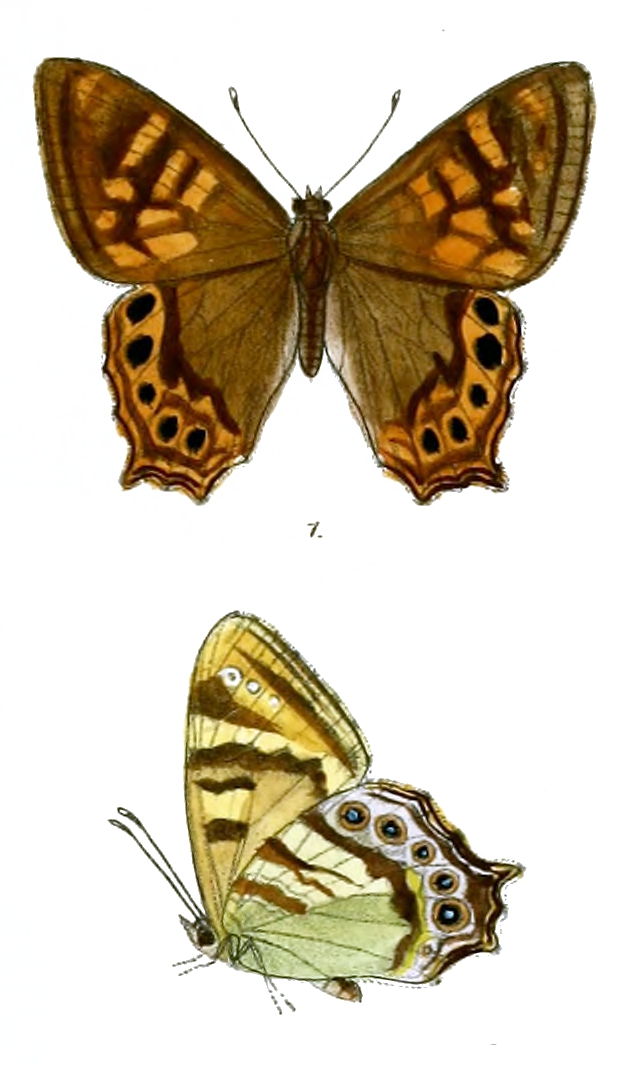
- Lethe atkinsonia in Lepidoptera Indica

Scientific classification
- Kingdom: Animalia
- Phylum: Arthropoda
- Clade: Pancrustacea
- Class: Insecta
- Order: Lepidoptera
- Family: Nymphalidae
- Genus: Lethe
- Species: L. atkinsonia

Binomial name
- Lethe atkinsonia Hewitson, 1876

= Lethe atkinsonia =

Small goldenfork

Species of butterfly

Lethe atkinsonia, the small goldenfork, is a species of Satyrinae butterfly found in the Indomalayan realm (Sikkim to Bhutan) .
