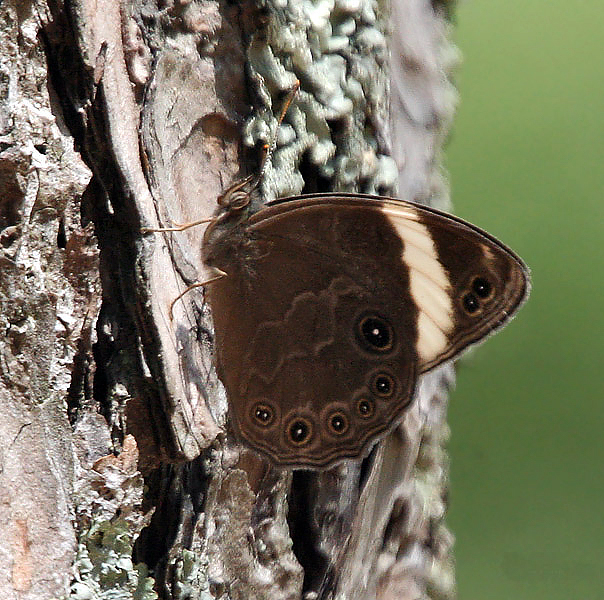
- Straight-banded treebrown (Lethe verma)

Scientific classification
- Kingdom: Animalia
- Phylum: Arthropoda
- Clade: Pancrustacea
- Class: Insecta
- Order: Lepidoptera
- Family: Nymphalidae
- Subfamily: Satyrinae
- Tribe: Elymniini
- Genus: Lethe; Hübner, [1819]

Subgenera
- Enodia Hübner, [1819]; Satyrodes Scudder, 1875

Synonyms
- Zophoessa; Debis

= Lethe (butterfly) =

Genus of butterflies

Lethe is a genus of butterflies in the subfamily Satyrinae of the family Nymphalidae. The genus was erected by Jacob Hübner in 1819. It includes the treebrowns, woodbrowns, foresters and their relatives. The species in the genus Lethe occur in temperate-tropical southern and eastern Asia, up to Indonesia and in North America.

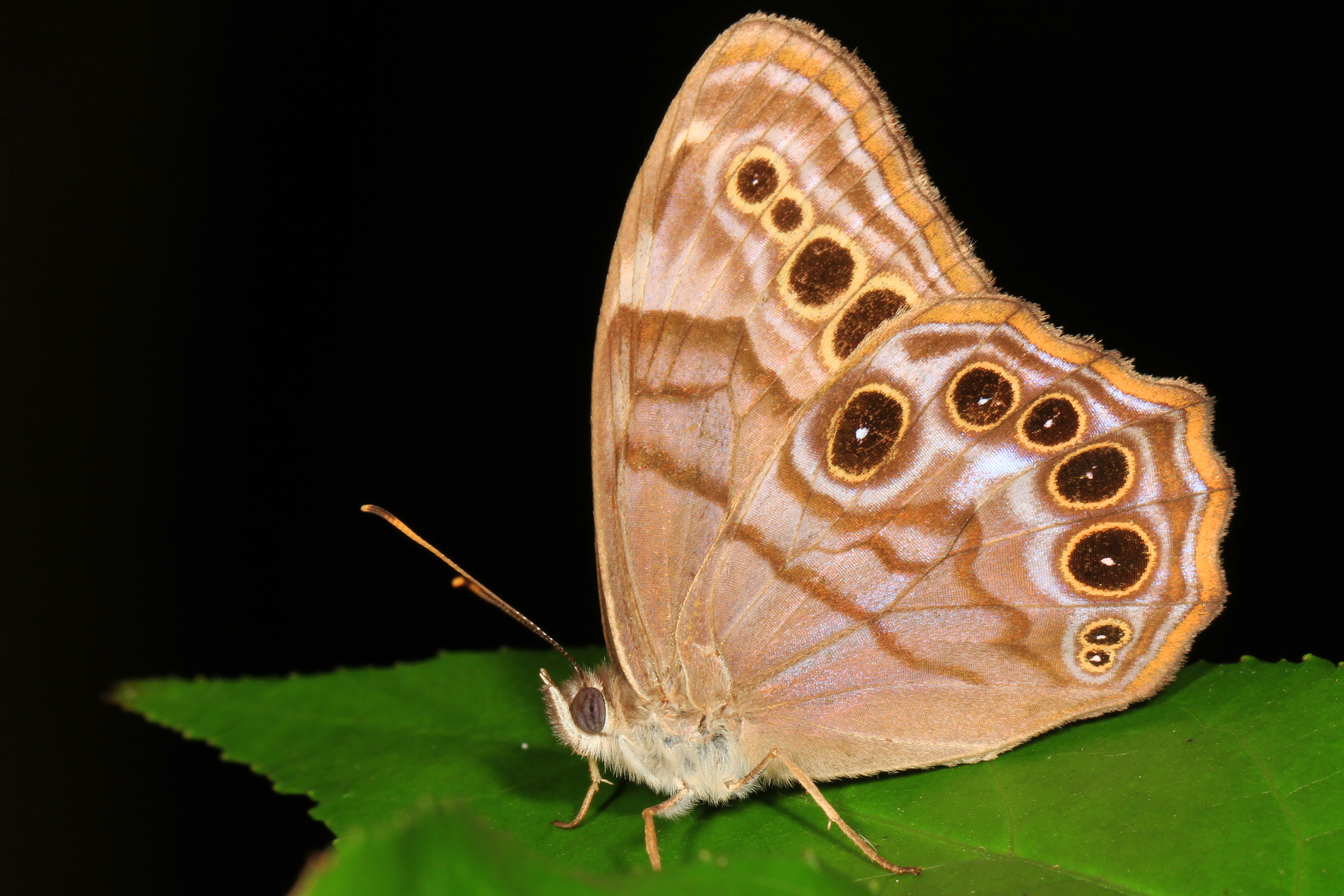
Lethe anthedon, northern pearly-eye

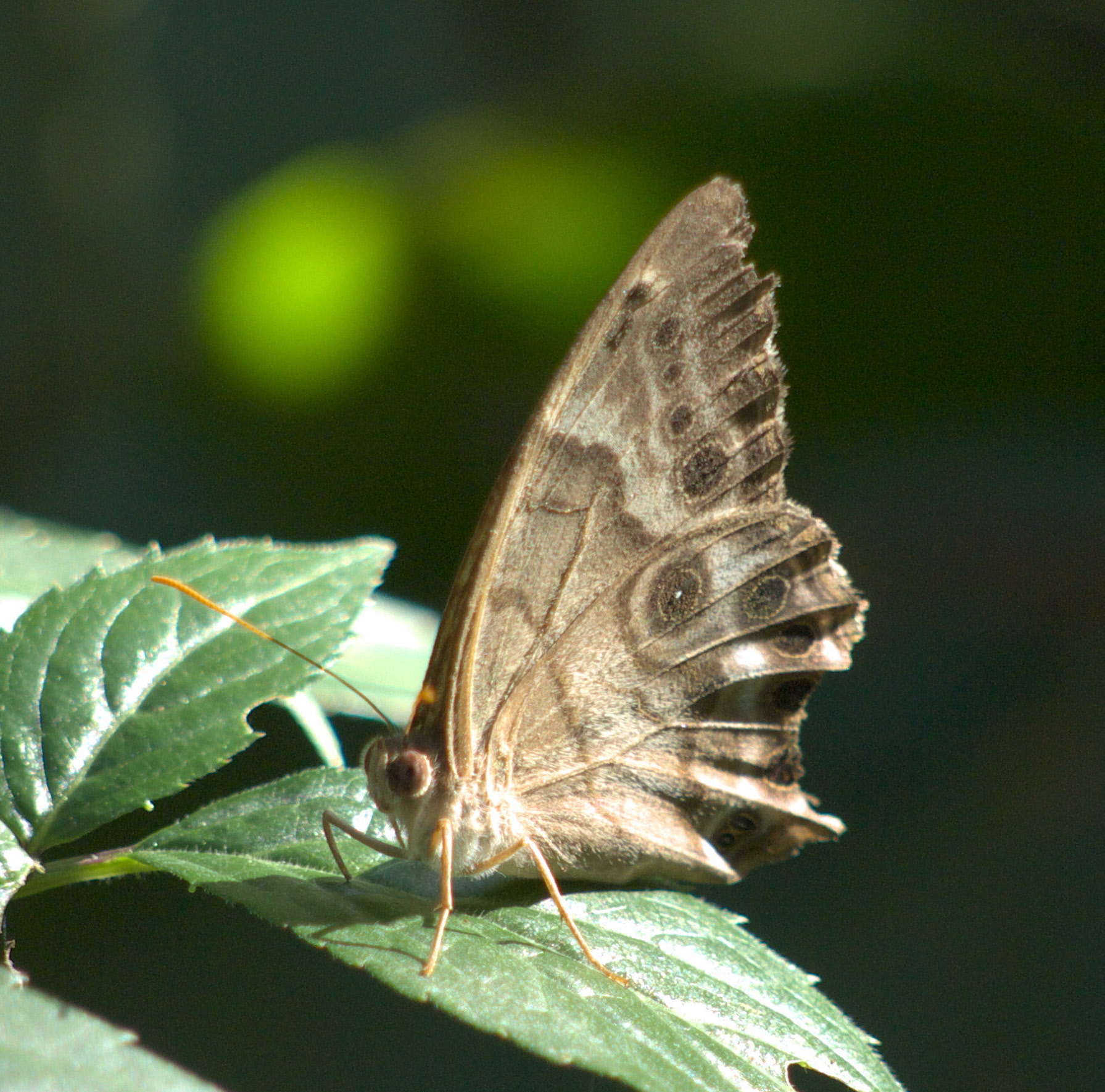
Lethe

== Selected species ==
These 108 species belong to the genus Lethe.

- Lethe albolineata Poujade, 1884^{c g}
- Lethe andersoni (Atkinson, 1871)^{c g}
- Lethe anthedon (A. Clark, 1936)^{i g b} (northern pearly-eye)
- Lethe appalachia R. Chermock, 1947^{i g b} (Appalachian brown)
- Lethe arete Cramer, 1780^{c g}
- Lethe argentata Leech, 1891^{c g}
- Lethe armandina Oberthür, 1881^{c g} (Chinese labyrinth )
- Lethe atkinsonia Hewitson, 1876^{c g} (small goldenfork )
- Lethe baileyi South, 1913^{c g}
- Lethe baladeva Moore, 1865^{c g} (treble silverstripe )
- Lethe baucis Leech, 1891^{c g}
- Lethe bhairava Moore, 1857^{c g} (rusty forester)
- Lethe bojonia Fruhstorfer, 1913^{g}
- Lethe brisanda de Nicéville, 1886^{c g}
- Lethe butleri Leech, 1889^{c g}
  - Lethe butleri periscelis Fruhstorfer, 1908
- Lethe callipteris Butler, 1877^{c g}
- Lethe camilla Leech, 1891^{c g}
- Lethe chandica Moore, 1857^{c g} (angled red forester)
  - Lethe chandica delila Staudinger, 1896^{c g}
  - Lethe chandica ratnacri Fruhstorfer, 1908
- Lethe christophi Leech, 1891^{c g}
  - Lethe christophi hanako Fruhstorfer, 1908
- Lethe confusa Aurivillius, 1897^{c g} (banded treebrown)
- †Lethe corbieri Nel et al. 1993
- Lethe creola (Skinner, 1897)^{i g b} (creole pearly-eye)
- Lethe cybele Leech^{c g}
- Lethe cyrene Leech, 1890^{c g}
- Lethe dakwania Tytler, 1939^{c g}
- Lethe darena Felder, 1867^{c g}
- Lethe daretis Hewitson, 1863^{c g} (Sri Lanka treebrown)
- Lethe dejeani Oberthür^{c g}
- Lethe diana Butler, 1866^{c g}
  - Lethe diana australis Naritomi, 1943
- Lethe distans Butler, 1870^{c g} (scarce red forester)
- Lethe dora Staudinger, 1896^{c g}
- Lethe drypetis Hewitson, 1863^{c g} (Tamil treebrown)
- Lethe dura Marshall, 1882^{c g} (scarce lilacfork)
- Lethe dynsate Hewitson, 1863^{c g} (Ceylon forester)
- Lethe dyrta Felder, 1867^{c g}
- Lethe elwesi Moore, 1892^{g}
- Lethe europa Fabricius, 1775^{c g} (bamboo treebrown)
  - Lethe europa pavida Fruhstorfer, 1908
- Lethe eurydice (Linnaeus, 1763)^{i c g b} (eyed brown)
- Lethe fumosus Leussler, 1916^{c g}
- Lethe gemina Leech, 1891^{c g} (Tytler's treebrown)
  - Lethe gemina zaitha Fruhstorfer, 1914
- Lethe giancbozanoi Lang & Monastyrskii^{g}
- Lethe goalpara Moore, 1865^{c g} (large goldenfork)
- Lethe gracilis Oberthür, 1886^{c g}
- Lethe gregoryi Watkins, 1927^{g}
- Lethe gulnihal de Nicéville, 1887 - dull forester
- Lethe hecate Leech, 1891^{c g} (dull forester)
- Lethe helena Leech, 1891^{c g}
- Lethe helle Leech, 1891^{c g}
- Lethe insana Kollar, 1844^{c g} (common forester)
  - Lethe insana formosana Fruhstorfer, 1908
- Lethe insularis Fruhstorfer, 1911^{c g}
- Lethe irma Evans, 1923^{c g}
- Lethe jalaurida de Nicéville, 1880^{c g} (small silverfork)
- Lethe kabrua Tytler, 1914^{c g} (Manipur goldenfork)
- Lethe kanjupkula Tytler, 1914^{c g}
- Lethe kansa Moore, 1857^{c g} (bamboo forester)
- Lethe kinabalensis Okubo, 1979^{c g}
- Lethe labyrinthea Leech, 1890^{c g}
- Lethe lanaris Butler, 1877^{c g}
- Lethe laodamia Leech, 1891^{c g}
- Lethe latiaris Hewitson, 1863^{c g} (pale forester)
- Lethe luteofasciata Poujade, 1884^{c g}
- Lethe maitrya de Nicéville, 1880^{c g} (barred woodbrown)
- Lethe manthara Felder, 1867^{c g}
- Lethe manzorum Poujade, 1884^{c g}
- Lethe margaritae Elwes, 1882^{c g} (Bhutan treebrown)
- Lethe marginalis Motschulsky, 1860^{c g}
- Lethe mataja Fruhstorfer, 1908^{c g}
- Lethe mekara Moore, 1857^{c g} (common red forester)
- Lethe minerva Fabricius, 1775^{c g}
- Lethe moelleri Elwes, 1887^{c g} (Moeller's silverfork)
- Lethe monilifera Oberthür, 1923^{c g}
- Lethe montana ^{g}
- Lethe naga Doherty, 1889^{c g} (Naga treebrown)
- Lethe nicetas Hewitson, [1868] - yellow woodbrown
- Lethe nicetella de Nicéville, 1887 - small woodbrown
- Lethe nicevillei Evans, 1924^{c g} (small woodbrown)
- Lethe nigrifascia Leech, 1890^{c g}
- Lethe ocellata Poujade, 1885^{c g} (dismal mystic)
- Lethe oculatissima Poujade, 1885^{c g}
- Lethe perimede Staudinger, 1895^{c g}
- Lethe portlandia (Fabricius, 1781)^{i b} (southern pearly-eye)
- Lethe procne Leech, 1891^{c g}
- Lethe proxima Leech, 1892/94^{c g}
- Lethe ramadeva De Nicéville, 1887^{c g} (single silverstripe)
- Lethe rohria Fabricius, 1787^{c g} (common treebrown)
  - Lethe rohria daemoniaca Fruhstorfer, 1908
- Lethe samio Doubleday, [1849]^{c g}
- Lethe satyavati de Nicéville, 1880 - pallid forester
- Lethe satyrina Butler, 1871^{c g} (pallid forester)
- Lethe scanda Moore, 1857^{c g} (blue forester)
- Lethe serbonis Hewitson, 1876^{c g} (brown forester)
  - Lethe serbonis serbonis
  - Lethe serbonis teesta
- Lethe sicelis Hewitson, 1862^{c g}
- Lethe siderea Marshall, 1880^{c g} - scarce woodbrown
- Lethe sidonis Hewitson, 1863^{c g} (common woodbrown)
- Lethe sinorix Hewitson, 1863^{c g} (tailed red forester)
- Lethe sisii Lang & Monastyrskii^{g}
- Lethe sura Doubleday, [1849]^{c g} (lilacfork)
- Lethe syrcis Doubleday, [1849]^{c g}
- Lethe titania Leech, 1891^{c g}
- Lethe trimacula Leech, 1890^{c g}
- Lethe tristigmata Elwes, 1887^{c g} (spotted mystic)
- Lethe vaivarta Doherty, 1886^{c g}
- Lethe verma Kollar, 1844^{c g} (straight-banded treebrown)
  - Lethe verma cintamani Fruhstorfer, 1848
- Lethe vindhya Felder, 1859^{c g} (black forester)
- Lethe violaceopicta Poujade, 1884^{c g} (Manipur woodbrown)
- Lethe visrava Moore, 1865^{c g} (white-edged woodbrown)
- Lethe yantra Fruhstorfer, 1914^{c g}
- Lethe zachara Fruhstorfer^{c g}

Data sources: i = ITIS, c = Catalogue of Life, g = GBIF, b = Bugguide.net
