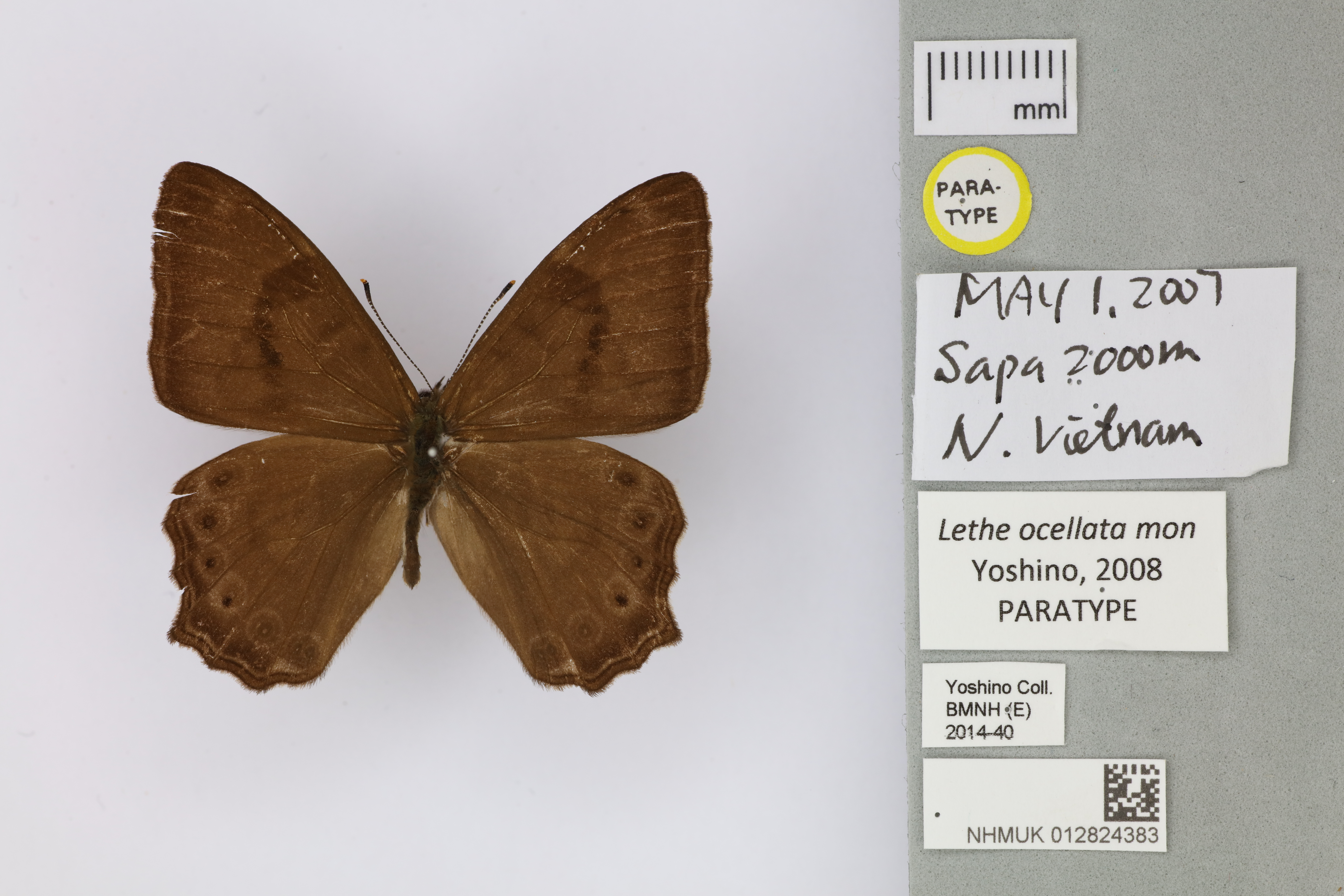
- A dorsal photograph of Lethe ocellata mon, Yoshino, 2008, a Paratype

Scientific classification
- Domain: Eukaryota
- Kingdom: Animalia
- Phylum: Arthropoda
- Class: Insecta
- Order: Lepidoptera
- Family: Nymphalidae
- Genus: Lethe
- Species: L. ocellata

Binomial name
- Lethe ocellata (Poujade, 1885)

= Lethe ocellata =

Dismal mystic

Species of butterfly

Lethe ocellata, the dismal mystic, is a species of Satyrinae butterfly found in the Indomalayan realm Sichuan, Tibet, Sikkim, Manipur and, as subspecies L. o. mon Yoshino, 2008 Vietnam)
