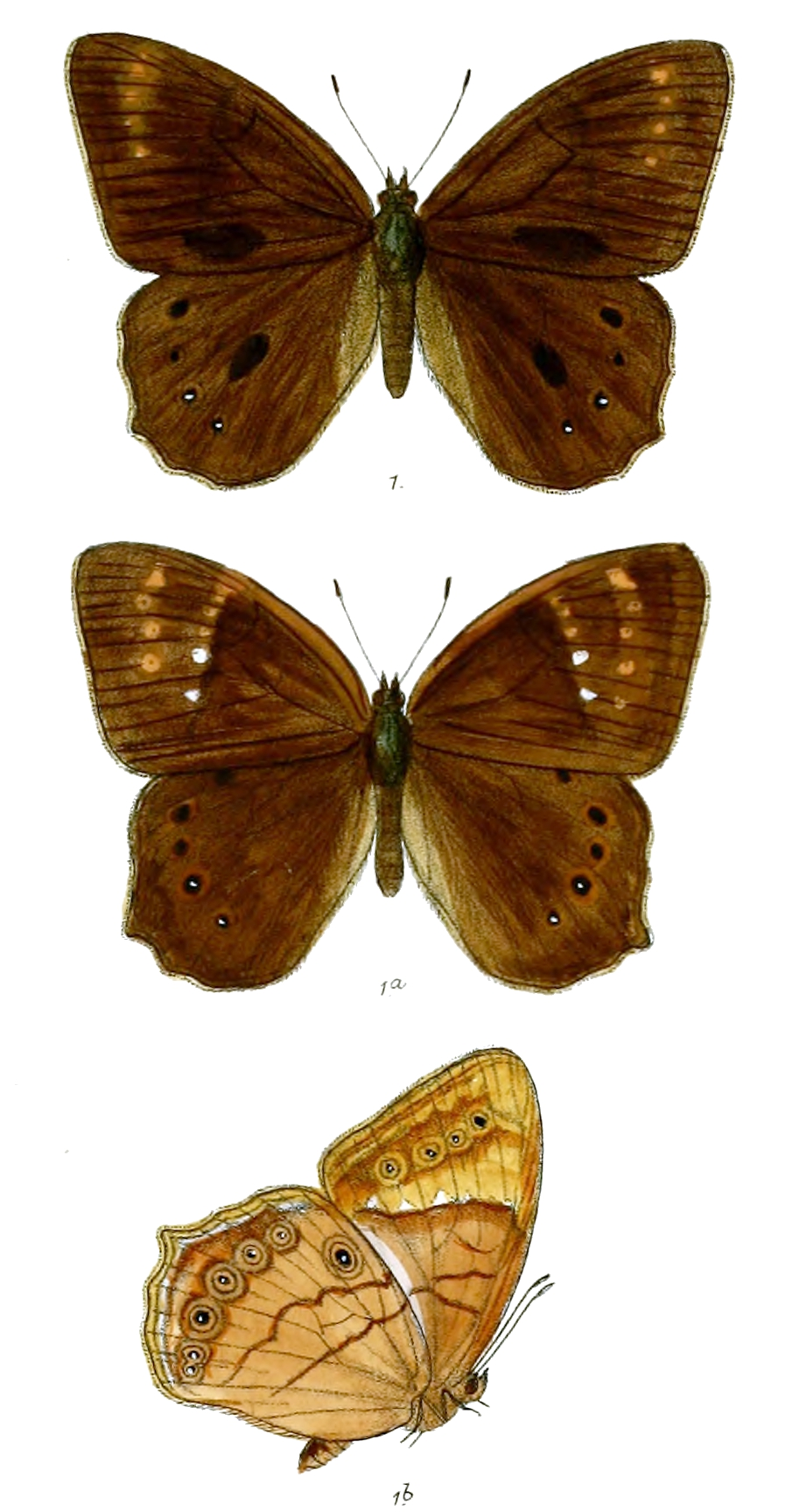
- Lethe bhairava in Lepidoptera Indica

Scientific classification
- Kingdom: Animalia
- Phylum: Arthropoda
- Clade: Pancrustacea
- Class: Insecta
- Order: Lepidoptera
- Family: Nymphalidae
- Genus: Lethe
- Species: L. bhairava

Binomial name
- Lethe bhairava (Moore, 1857)

= Lethe bhairava =

Rusty forester

Species of butterfly

Lethe bhairava , the rusty forester, is a species of Satyrinae butterfly found in the Indomalayan realm (Bhutan and Assam)
