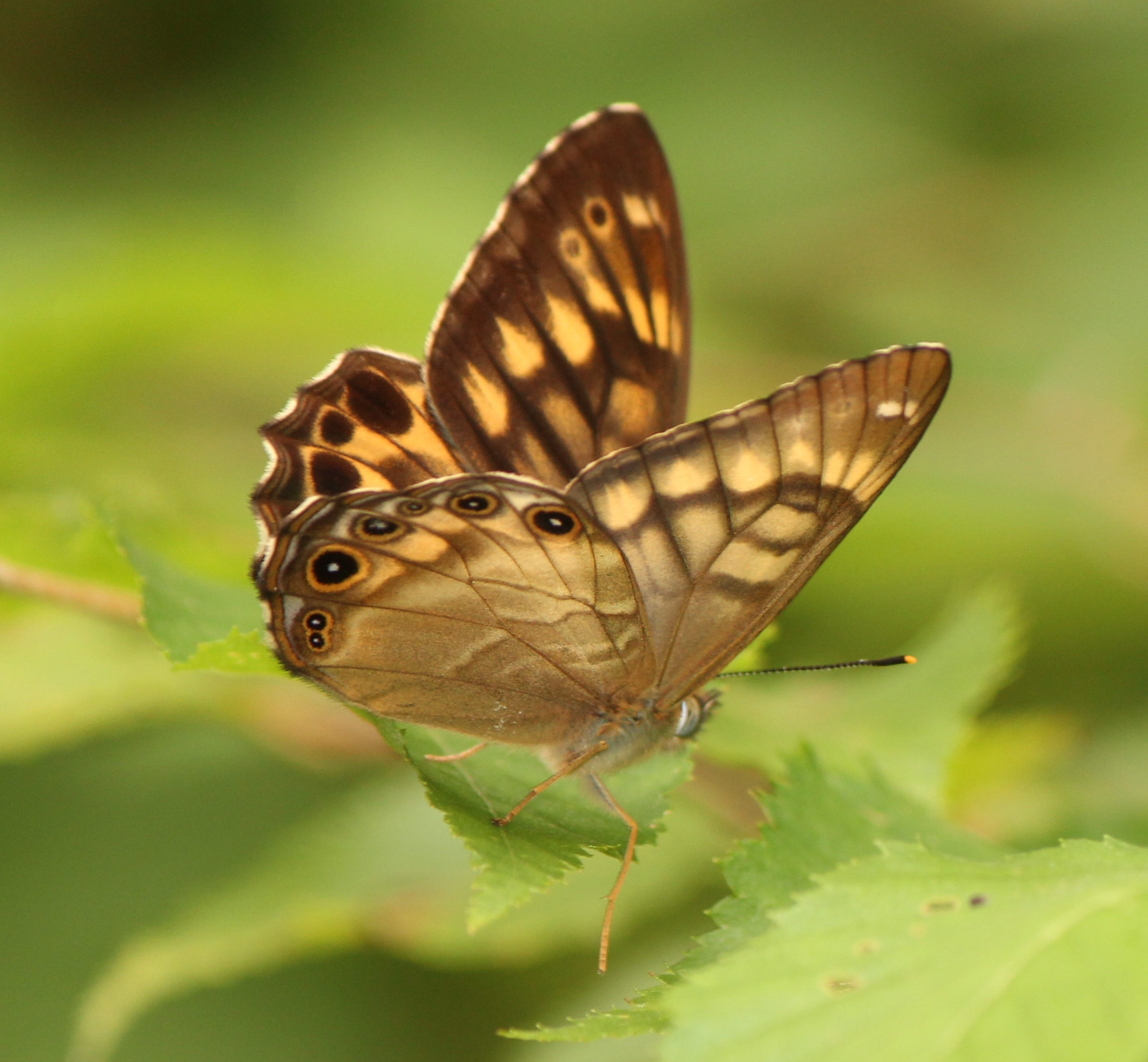

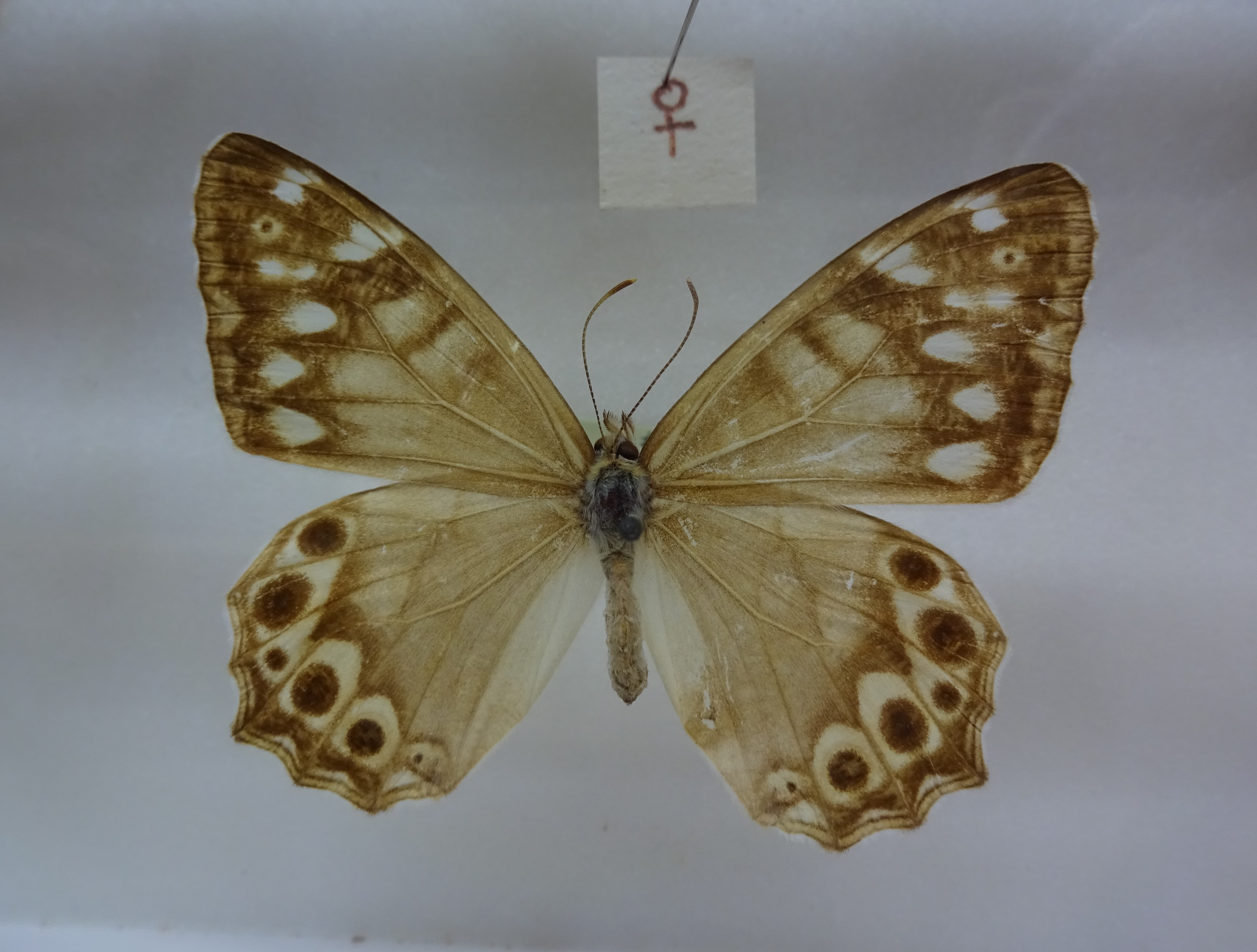

Scientific classification
- Domain: Eukaryota
- Kingdom: Animalia
- Phylum: Arthropoda
- Class: Insecta
- Order: Lepidoptera
- Family: Nymphalidae
- Genus: Lethe
- Species: L. callipteris

Binomial name
- Lethe callipteris (Butler, 1877)

Synonyms
- Neope callipteris Butler, 1877; Zophoessa callipteris; Lethe suffusa Esaki, 1924; Lethe diluta Esaki, 1924; Lethe minima Esaki, 1924

= Lethe callipteris =

Species of butterfly

Lethe callipteris is a butterfly in the family Nymphalidae (Satyrinae). It is found in the East Palearctic where it is endemic to Japan, Sakhalin (L. c. karafutonis Matsumura, 1925) and the Kuriles (L. c. obscura Nakahara, 1926).

The larva feeds on Sasa and Pleioblastus, etc. (Graminae). It has single generation and hibernates as a larva.

== Subspecies ==
- Lethe callipteris callipteris (Japan)
- Lethe callipteris karafutonis Matsumura, 1925 (Sakhalin)
- Lethe callipteris obscura Nakahara, 1926 (Kuriles)
