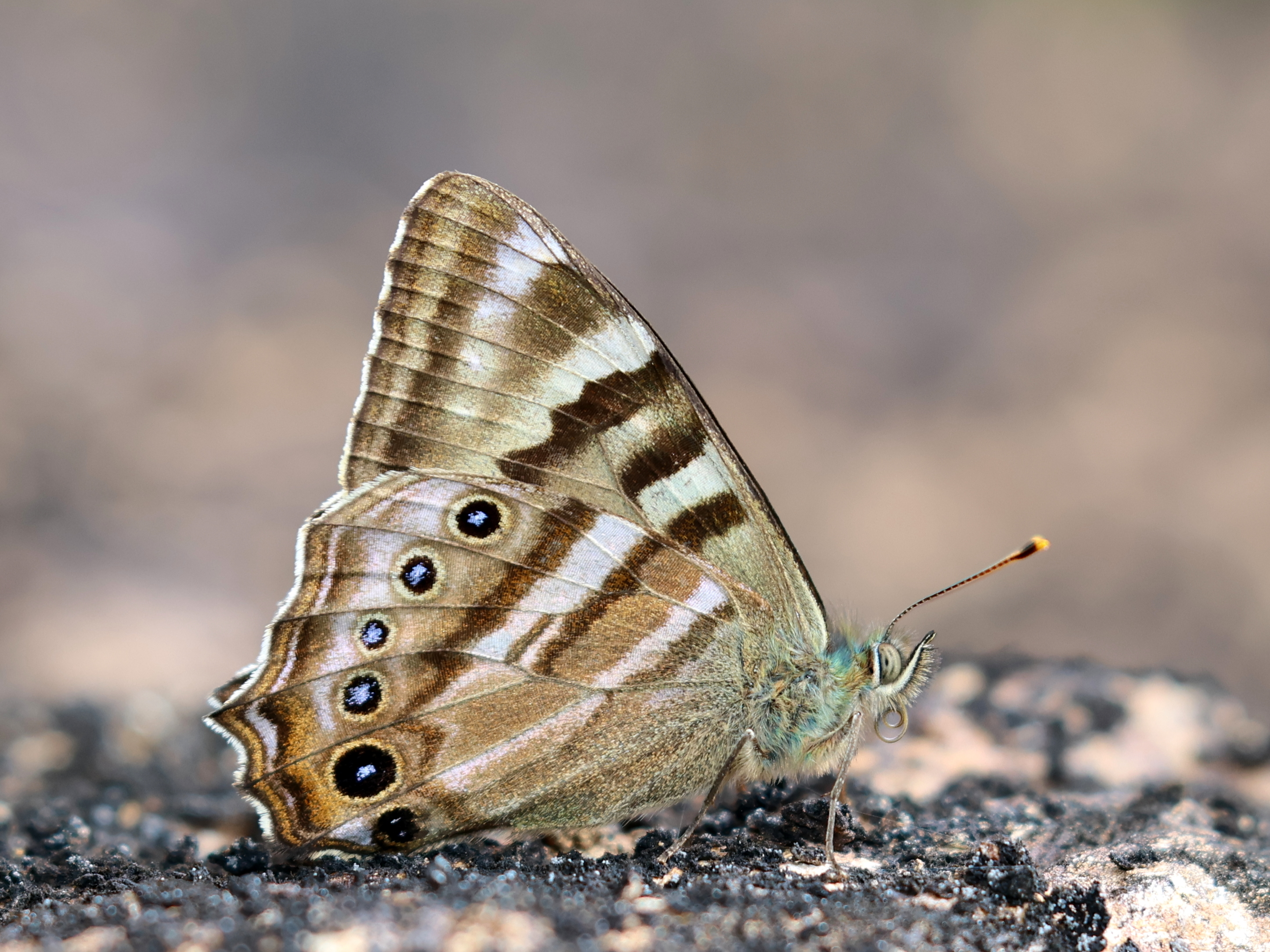
- Lethe moelleri

Scientific classification
- Kingdom: Animalia
- Phylum: Arthropoda
- Class: Insecta
- Order: Lepidoptera
- Family: Nymphalidae
- Genus: Lethe
- Species: L. moelleri

Binomial name
- Lethe moelleri Elwes, 1887

= Lethe moelleri =

Moeller's silverfork

Species of butterfly

Lethe moelleri, Moeller's silverfork, is a species of Satyrinae butterfly found in the Indomalayan realm (Bhutan, Sikkim to Guanxi and, as subspecies bruno Tytler, 1939, Burma)
