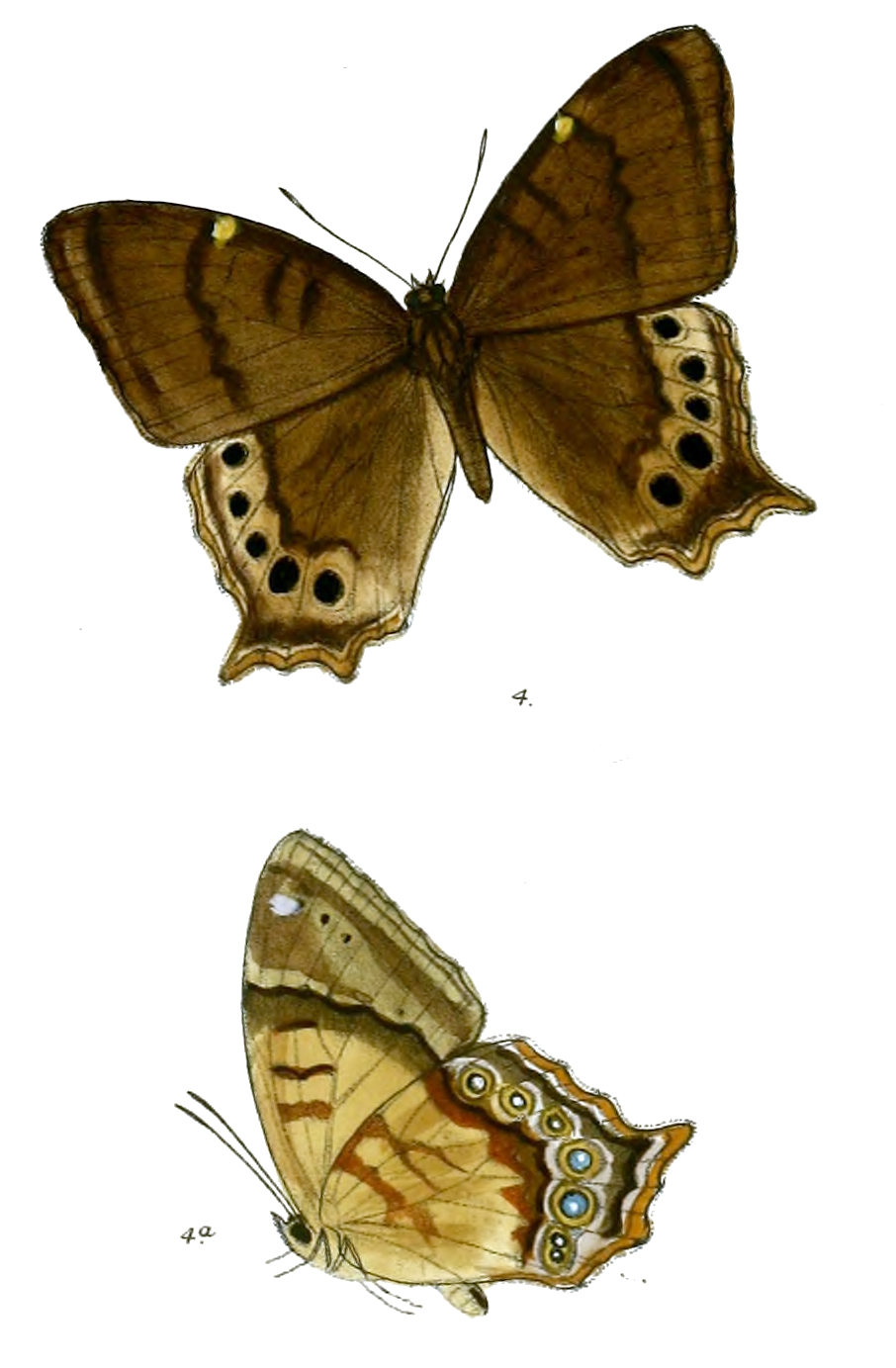
- Lethe goalpara in Lepidoptera Indica

Scientific classification
- Kingdom: Animalia
- Phylum: Arthropoda
- Clade: Pancrustacea
- Class: Insecta
- Order: Lepidoptera
- Family: Nymphalidae
- Genus: Lethe
- Species: L. goalpara

Binomial name
- Lethe goalpara (Moore, 1865)

= Lethe goalpara =

Large goldenfork

Species of butterfly

Lethe goalpara , the large goldenfork, is a species of Satyrinae butterfly found in the Indomalayan realm.

== Subspecies ==
- L. g. goalpara North India to Assam, Simla Hills, Sikkim
- L. g. kabruensis Tytler, 1939 Manipur (Kabru)
- L. g. gana Talbot, 1947 Upper Burma
