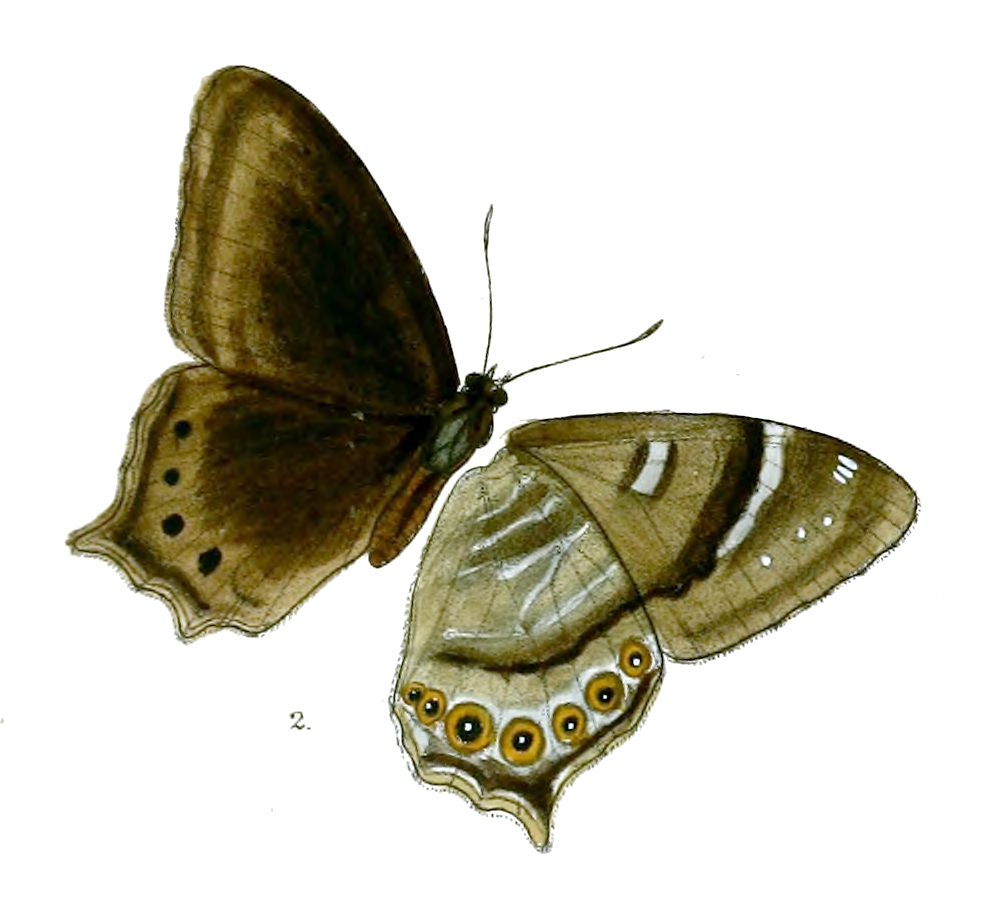
- Lethe dura in Lepidoptera Indica

Scientific classification
- Domain: Eukaryota
- Kingdom: Animalia
- Phylum: Arthropoda
- Class: Insecta
- Order: Lepidoptera
- Family: Nymphalidae
- Genus: Lethe
- Species: L. dura

Binomial name
- Lethe dura (Marshall, 1882)

= Lethe dura =

Scarce lilacfork

Species of butterfly

Lethe dura, the scarce lilacfork, is a species of Satyrinae butterfly found in the Indomalayan realm.

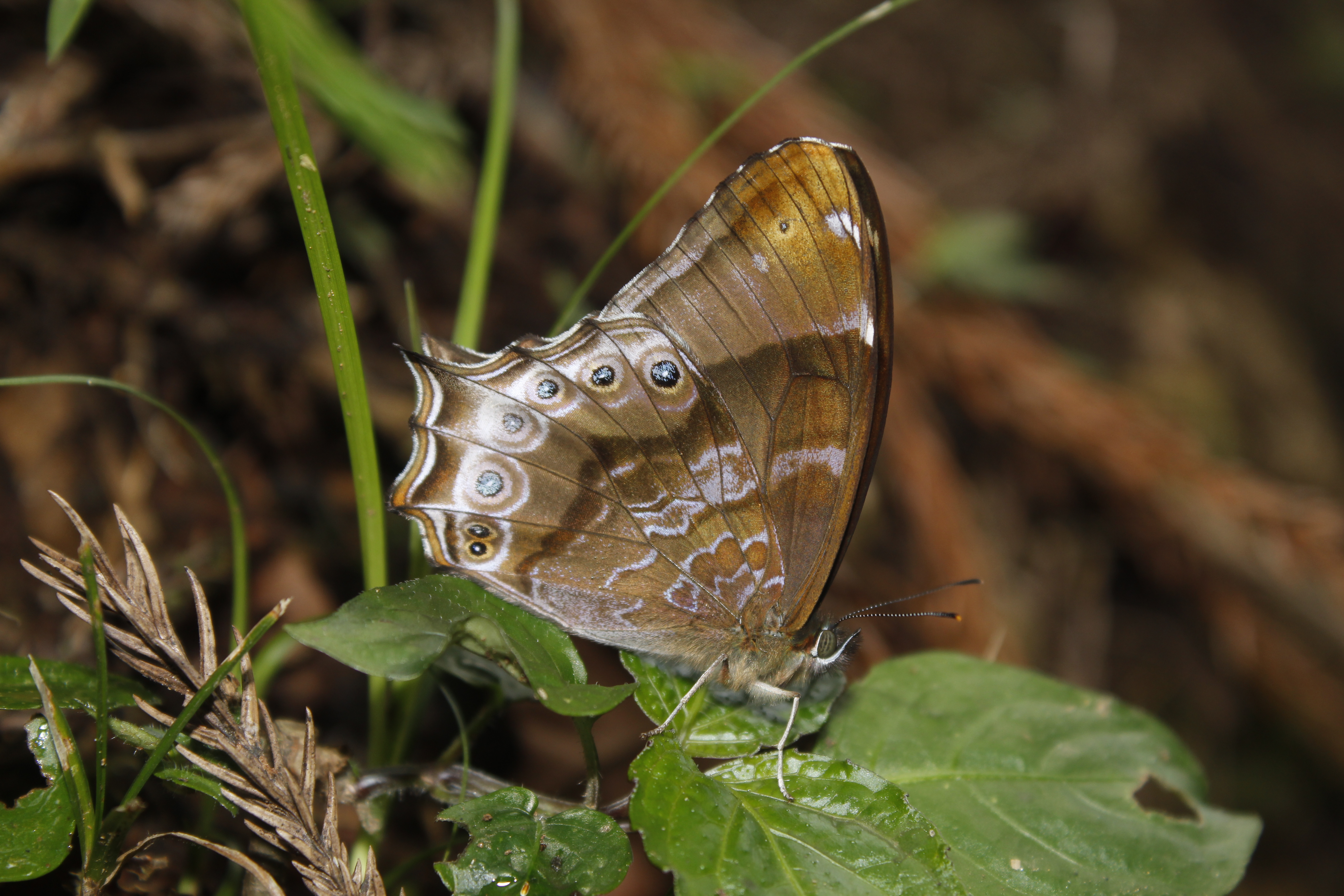
Close wing basking position of Lethe dura (Marshall, 1882) - Scarce Lilacfork

== Subspecies ==
- L. d. dura Himalays, West China, Formosa Assam, Burma, Thailand
- L. d. gammiei (Moore, [1892]) Northwest India, Bhutan, Sikkim
- L. d. mansonia Fruhstorfer, 1911 Indo China, Vietnam
- L. d. moupiniensis (Poujade, 1884) West China
- L. d. neoclides Fruhstorfer, 1909 Taiwan
