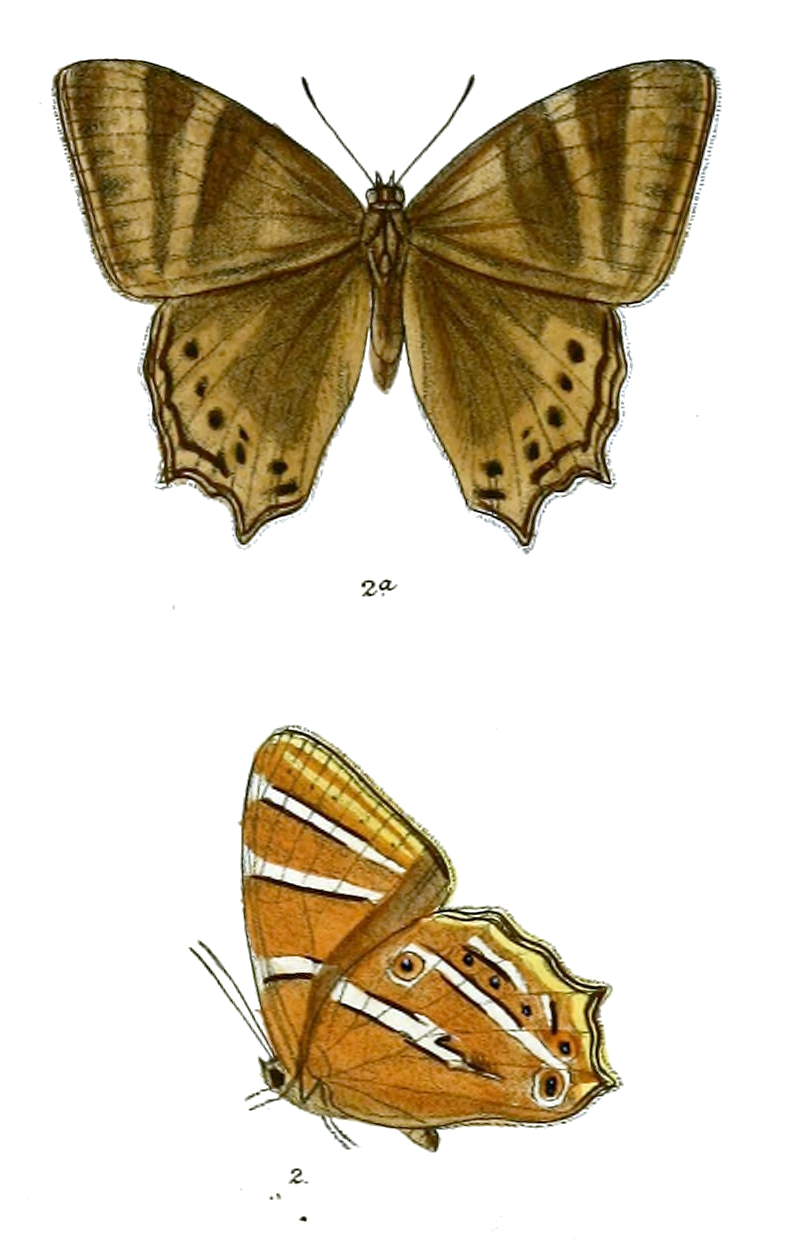
- Lethe andersoni in Lepidoptera Indica

Scientific classification
- Domain: Eukaryota
- Kingdom: Animalia
- Phylum: Arthropoda
- Class: Insecta
- Order: Lepidoptera
- Family: Nymphalidae
- Genus: Lethe
- Species: L. andersoni

Binomial name
- Lethe andersoni (Atkinson, 1871)

= Lethe andersoni =

Species of butterfly

Lethe andersoni is a species of Satyrinae butterfly found in the Indomalayan realm ( Assam (Cherrapunji), Upper Burma, West China).
