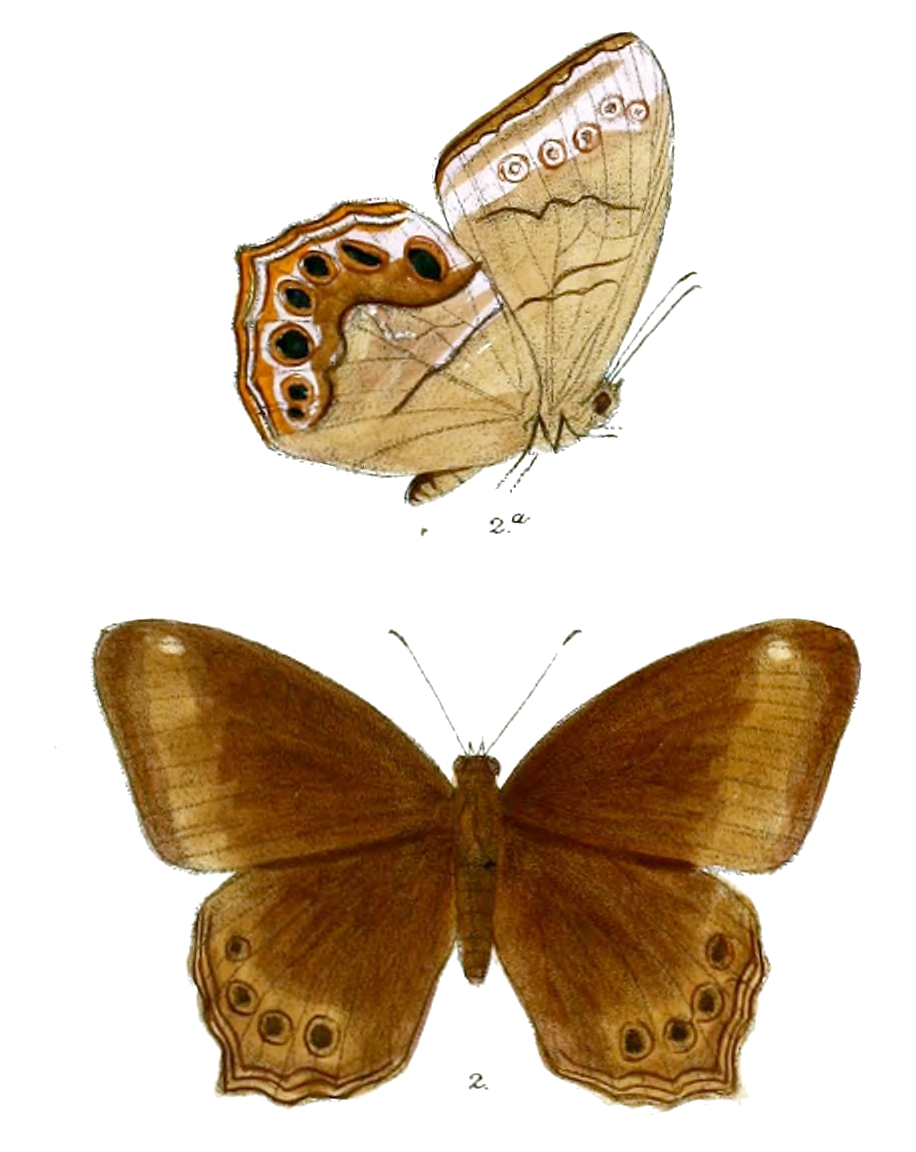

Scientific classification
- Domain: Eukaryota
- Kingdom: Animalia
- Phylum: Arthropoda
- Class: Insecta
- Order: Lepidoptera
- Family: Nymphalidae
- Genus: Lethe
- Species: L. satyavati

Binomial name
- Lethe satyavati de Nicéville, 1880

= Lethe satyavati =

Pallid Forester

Species of butterfly

Lethe satyavati, the pallid forester, is a species of Satyrinae butterfly found in the Indomalayan realm where it is endemic to Assam
