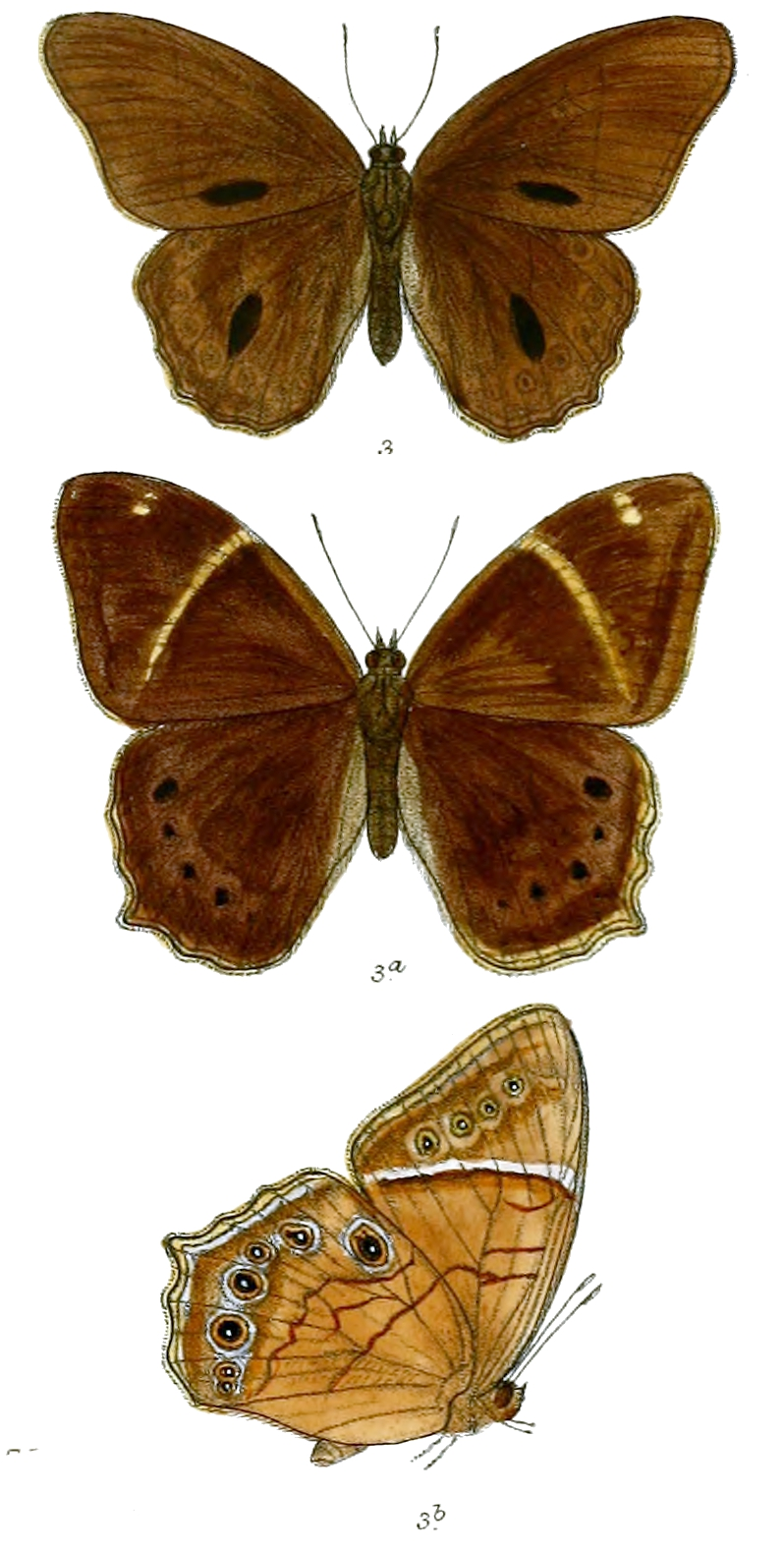
- Lethe latiaris in Lepidoptera Indica

Scientific classification
- Domain: Eukaryota
- Kingdom: Animalia
- Phylum: Arthropoda
- Class: Insecta
- Order: Lepidoptera
- Family: Nymphalidae
- Genus: Lethe
- Species: L. latiaris

Binomial name
- Lethe latiaris (Hewitson, 1863)

= Lethe latiaris =

Pale forester

Species of insect

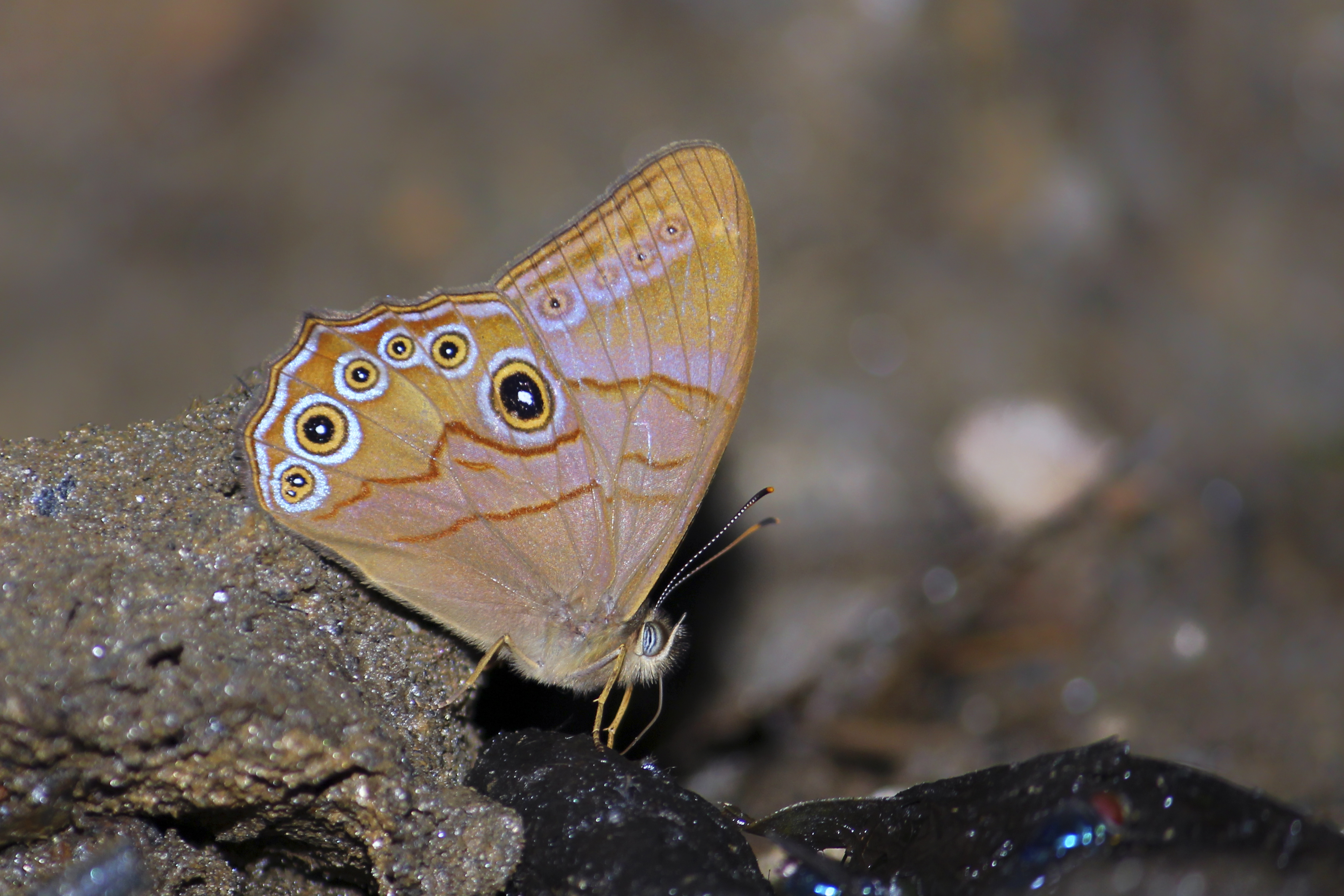
Close wing position of Lethe latiaris Hewitson, 1863 – Pale Forester

Lethe latiaris , the pale forester, is a species of Satyrinae butterfly found in the Indomalayan realm

== Subspecies ==
- L. l. latiaris Sikkim - Assam, Karens, Yunnan
- L. l. perimela Fruhstorfer, 1911 Burma, Thailand, Laos, Vietnam

== Synonym ==
- L. l. lishadii Huang, 2002 S E Tibet was synonymized for nominate race by Yoshino 2022
- L. unistigma Lee, 1996 Yunnan was synonymized for nominate race by Yoshino 2022
