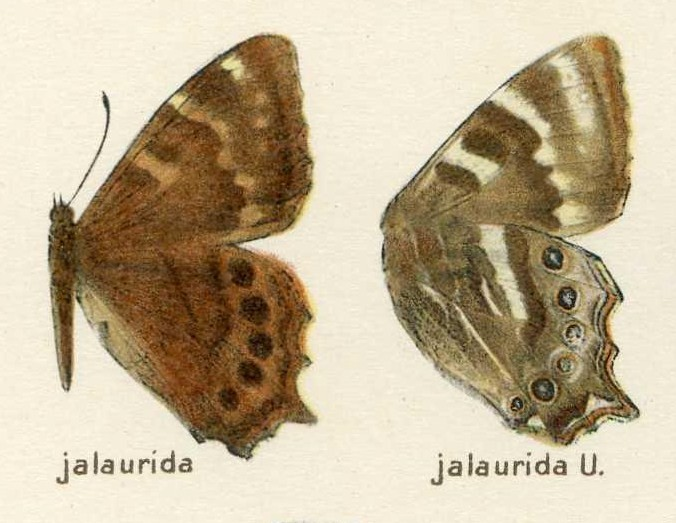
- Upperside left, underside right - from Adalbert Seitz

Scientific classification
- Domain: Eukaryota
- Kingdom: Animalia
- Phylum: Arthropoda
- Class: Insecta
- Order: Lepidoptera
- Family: Nymphalidae
- Genus: Lethe
- Species: L. jalaurida

Binomial name
- Lethe jalaurida (de Nicéville, 1880)

= Lethe jalaurida =

Small silverfork

Species of butterfly

Lethe jalaurida, the small silverfork, is a species of Satyrinae butterfly found in western China, Sikkim (northern India) and Burma.

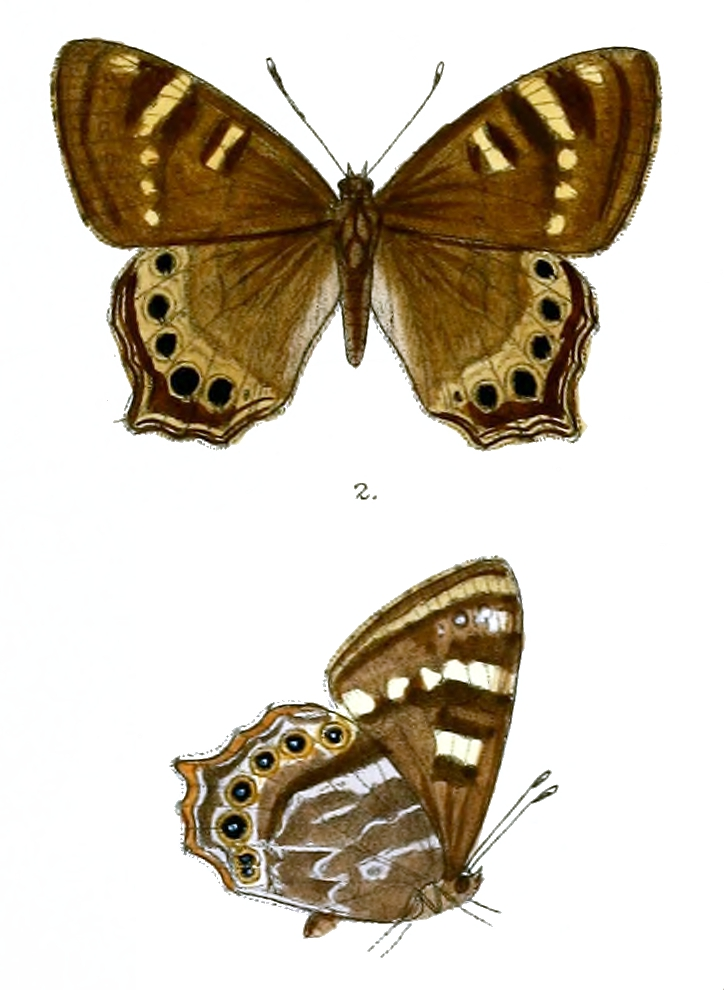
