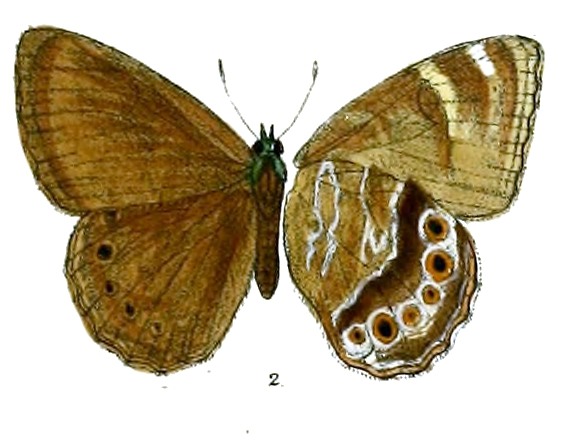
- Lethe nicetella in Lepidoptera Indica

Scientific classification
- Domain: Eukaryota
- Kingdom: Animalia
- Phylum: Arthropoda
- Class: Insecta
- Order: Lepidoptera
- Family: Nymphalidae
- Genus: Lethe
- Species: L. nicetella

Binomial name
- Lethe nicetella de Nicéville, 1887

= Lethe nicetella =

Small woodbrown

Species of butterfly

Lethe nicetella, the small woodbrown, is a species of Satyrinae butterfly found in the Indomalayan realm (Tibet, Sikkim).
