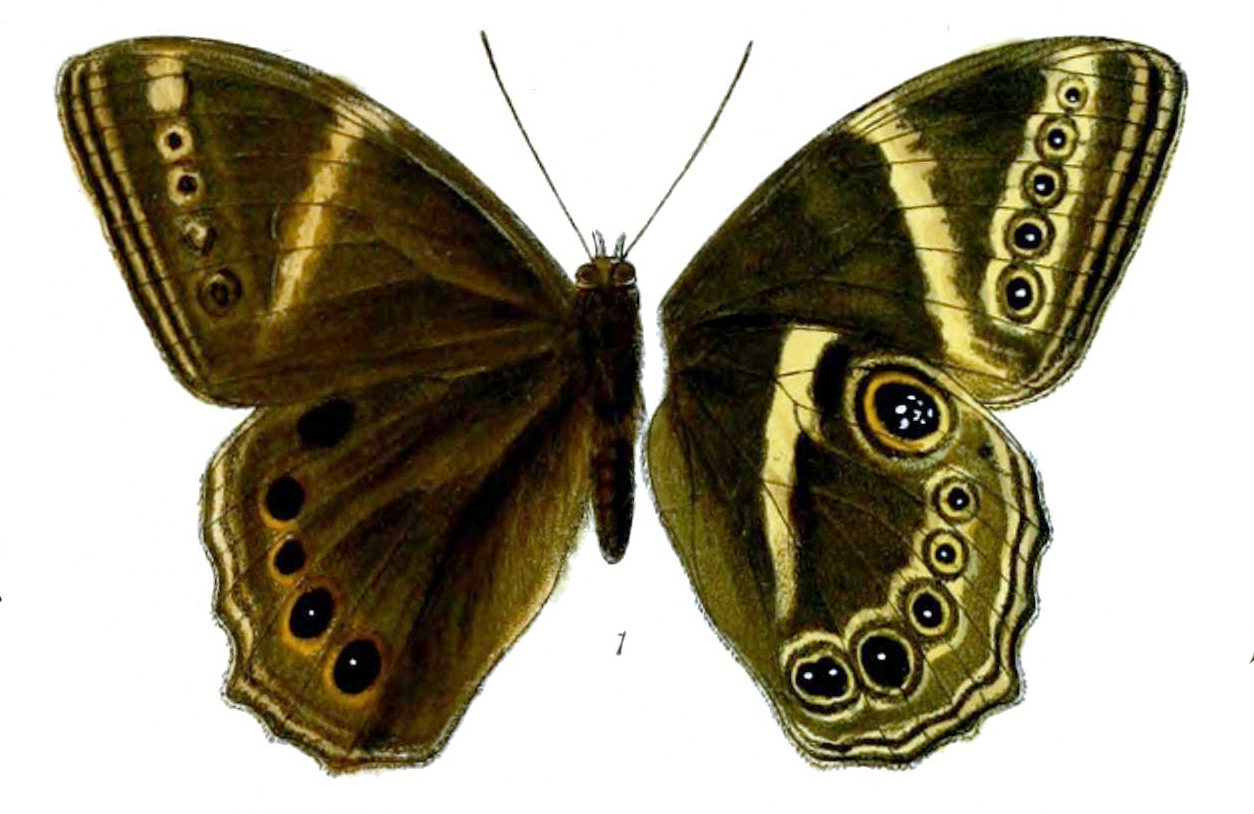
- Upper (left) and underside (right)

Scientific classification
- Domain: Eukaryota
- Kingdom: Animalia
- Phylum: Arthropoda
- Class: Insecta
- Order: Lepidoptera
- Family: Nymphalidae
- Genus: Lethe
- Species: L. margaritae

Binomial name
- Lethe margaritae Elwes, 1882

= Lethe margaritae =

Species of butterfly

Lethe margaritae, the Bhutan treebrown, is a species of Satyrinae butterfly found in the Indomalayan realm where it occurs in Bhutan and Sikkim
