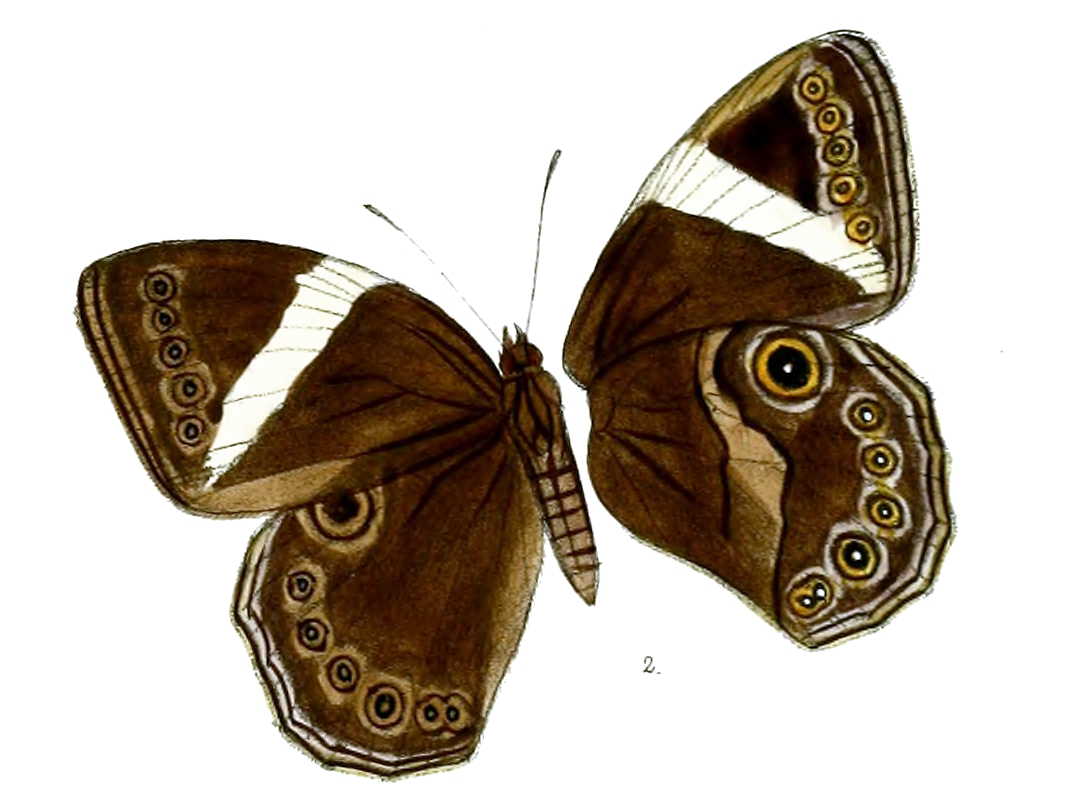
- Lethe naga in Lepidoptera Indica

Scientific classification
- Kingdom: Animalia
- Phylum: Arthropoda
- Class: Insecta
- Order: Lepidoptera
- Family: Nymphalidae
- Genus: Lethe
- Species: L. naga

Binomial name
- Lethe naga Doherty, 1889

= Lethe naga =

Naga treebrown

Species of butterfly

Lethe naga, the Naga treebrown, is a species of Satyrinae butterfly found in the Indomalayan realm where it occurs from Assam to Myanmar, Thailand and Laos It is named for the Naga hills.
