= List of butterflies of Bhutan =

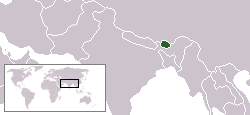
Location of Bhutan

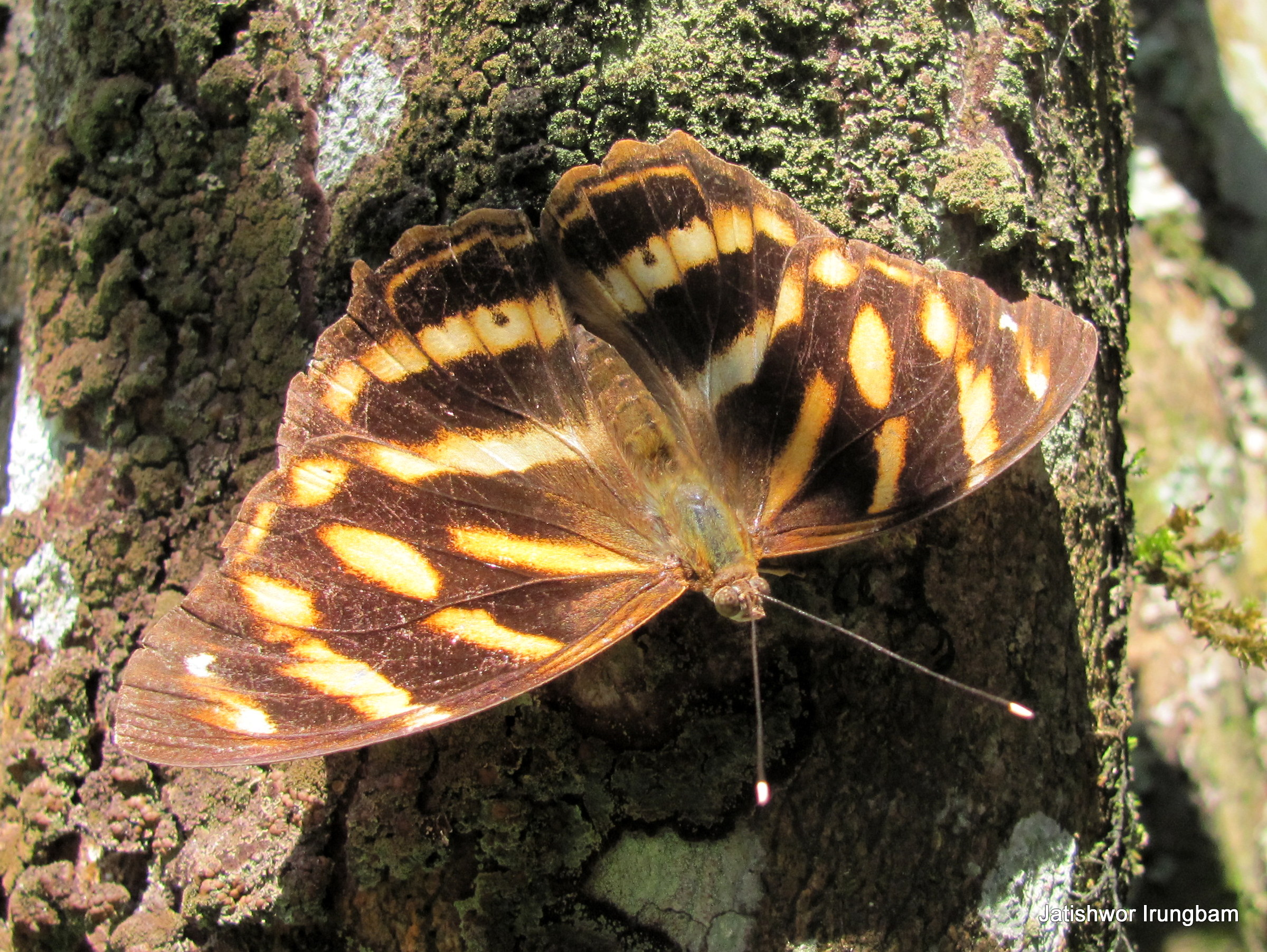
Herona marathus Doubleday, 1848

This is a list of butterflies of Bhutan. About 670 species are known from Bhutan, but it is estimated that a total of 800-900 species occurs.

	Scientific name	Author	Common name
	Superfamily: Papilionoidea		
	Family: Papilionidae		
	Subfamily: Papilioninae		
	Tribe: Leptocircini		
1	Graphium cloanthus cloanthus	Westwood, 1841	Glassy bluebottle
2	Graphium sarpedon sirkari	Page & Treadaway, 2013	Common bluebottle
3	Graphium doson axionides	Page & Treadaway, 2014	Common jay
4	Graphium eurypylus acheron	Moore, 1885	Great jay
5	Graphium chironides chironides	Honrath, 1884	Veined jay
6	Graphium agamemnon agamemnon	Linnaeus, 1758	Tailed jay
7	Graphium macareus indicus	Rothschild, 1895	Lesser zebra
8	Graphium xenocles phrontis	de Nicéville, 1897	Great zebra
9	Graphium mandarinus paphus	de Nicéville, 1886	Spectacled swordtail
10	Graphium agetes agetes	Westwood, 1843	Four bar swordtail
11	Graphium antiphates pompilius	Fabricius, 1787	Five bar swordtail
12	Graphium eurous sikkimica	Heron, 1899	Six bar swordtail
13	Graphium nomius nomius	Esper, 1799	Spot swordtail
14	Graphium aristeus anticrates	Doubleday, 1846	Chain swordtail
	Tribe Teinopalpini		
15	Teinopalpus imperialis himalaicus	Rothschild, 1898	Kaiser-i-hind
16	Meandrusa lachinus lachinus	Fruhstorfer, 1902	Brown gorgon
17	Meandrusa payeni evan	Doubleday, 1845	Yellow gorgon
	Tribe Papilionini		
18	Papilio memnon agenor	Linnaeus, 1758	Great Mormon
19	Papilio bootes janaka	Moore, 1857	Tailed redbreast
20	Papilio alcmenor alcmenor	C. & R. Felder, 1865	Redbreast
21	Papilio protenor euprotenor	Fruhstorfer, 1908	Spangle
22	Papilio bianor	Cramer, 1777	Common peacock
23	Papilio paris paris	Linnaeus, 1758	Paris peacock
24	Papilio arcturus arcturus	Westwood, 1842	Blue peacock
25	Papilio krishna krishna	Moore, 1858	Krishna peacock
26	Papilio castor polias	Jordan, 1909	Common raven
27	Papilio helenus helenus	Linnaeus, 1758	Red Helen
28	Papilio nephelus chaon	Westwood, 1844	Yellow Helen
29	Papilio polytes	Linnaeus, 1758	Common Mormon
30	Papilio demoleus demoleus	Linnaeus, 1758	Lime swallowtail
31	Papilio machaon hookeri	Goankar, 1999	Yellow swallowtail
32	Papilio agestor agestor	Gray, 1831	Tawny mime
33	Papilio epycides epycides	Hewitson, 1864	Lesser mime
34	Papilio slateri slateri	Hewitson, 1859	Blue-striped mime
35	Papilio paradoxa telearchus	Hewitson, 1852	Great blue mime
36	Papilio clytia clytia	Linnaeus, 1758	Common mime
	Tribe Troidini		
37	Atrophaneura aidoneus	Doubleday, 1845	Lesser batwing
38	Atrophaneura varuna astorion	Westwood, 1842	Common batwing
39	Atrophaneura alcinous	Klug, 1836	Chinese windmill
40	Pachliopta hector	Linnaeus, 1758	Crimson rose
41	Pachliopta aristolochiae aristolochiae	Fabricius, 1775	Common rose
42	Byasa latreillei latreillei	Donovan, 1826	Rose windmill
43	Byasa polyeuctes polyeuctes	Doubleday, 1842	Common windmill
44	Byasa polla	de Nicéville, 1897	de Nicéville's windmill
45	Byasa dasarada dasarada	Moore, 1858	Great windmill
46	Byasa plutonius pembertoni	Moore, 1902	Chinese windmill
47	Troides helena cerbus	C. & R. Felder, 1865	Common birdwing
48	Troides aeacus aeacus	C. & R. Felder, 1860	Golden birdwing
	Subfamily Parnassiinae		
	Tribe Parnassini		
49	Parnassius epaphus	Oberthur, 1879	Common red Apollo
50	Parnassius hardwickii	Gray, 1831	Common blue Apollo
51	Parnassius hunnyngtoni	Avinoff, 1916	Hunnyngton's Apollo
52	Parnassius acdestis pundit	Avinoff, 1922	Apollo
53	Parnassius delphius	Eversmann, 1843	Banded Apollo
	Tribe Zerynthini		
54	Bhutanitis lidderdalii lidderdalii	Atkinson, 1873	Bhutan glory
55	Bhutanitis ludlowi	Gabriel, 1942	Ludlow's Bhutan glory
	Family Pieridae		
	Subfamily Pierinae		
	Tribe Pierini		
56	Aporia harrietae harrietae	de Nicéville, 1892	Bhutan blackvein
57	Aporia agathon agathon	Gray, 1831	Great blackvein
58	Pieris brassicae nepalensis	Doubleday, 1846	Large cabbage white
59	Pieris canidia indica	Evans, 1926	Indian cabbage white
60	Pieris extensa bhutya	Talbot, 1939	Bhutan white
61	Pieris erutae montana	Verity, 1908	Grey-veined white
62	Pieris napi	Linnaeus 1758	Green-veined white
63	Pontia daplidice moorei	Rober, 1907	Bath white
64	Cepora nadina nadina	Lucas, 1852	Lesser gull
65	Cepora nerissa phryne	Fabricius, 1775	Common gull
66	Delias lativitta parva	Talbot, 1937	Broadwing Jezebel
67	Delias sanaca bhutya	Talbot, 1937	Pale Jezebel
68	Delias belladonna	Fabricius, 1793	Hill Jezebel
69	Delias pasithoe pasithoe	Linnaeus, 1767	Red-base Jezebel
70	Delias acalis pyramus	Wallace, 1867	Red-breast Jezebel
71	Delias descombesi leucaeantha	Fruhstorfer, 1910	Red-Spot Jezebel
72	Delias agostina agostina	Hewitson, 1852	Yellow Jezebel
73	Delias eucharis	Drury, 1773	Common Jezebel
74	Delias berinda	Moore 1872	Dark Jezebel
75	Delias hyparete hierte	Hubner 1818	Painted Jezebel
76	Prioneris thestylis thestylis	Doubleday, 1842	Spotted sawtooth
77	Appias libythea	Fabricius, 1775	Striped albatross
78	Appias lyncida eleonora	Boisduval, 1836	Chocolate albatross
79	Appias albina darada	C. & R. Felder, 1865	Common albatross
80	Appias paulina adamsoni	Moore, 1905	Lesser albatross
81	Appias lalage lalage	Doubleday, 1842	Spot puffin
82	Appias indra	Moore, 1857	Plain puffin
83	Appias nero	Wallace, 1867	Orange albatross
84	Leptosia nina nina	Fabricius, 1793	Psyche
	Tribe Teracolini		
85	Ixias marianne	Cramer, 1779	White orangetip
86	Ixias pyrene pirenassa	Wallace, 1867	Yellow orangetip
88	Colotis danae	Fabricius, 1775	Crimsontip
89	Colotis etrida	Boisduval, 1836	Small orangetip
	Tribe Anthocharini		
87	Hebomoia glaucippe glaucippe	Linnaeus, 1758	Great orangetip
	Tribe Nepheroniini		
90	Pareronia avatar avatar	Moore, 1858	Pale wanderer
91	Pareronia valeria hippa	Fabricius, 1787	Common wanderer
	Subfamily Coliadinae		
92	Catopsilia pomona pomona	Fabricius, 1775	Common/lemon emigrant
93	Catopsilia pyranthe pyranthe	Linnaeus, 1758	Mottled emigrant
94	Dercas verhuelli doubledayi	Moore, 1905	Tailed sulphur
95	Dercas lycorias	Doubleday 1842	Plain sulphur
96	Gonepteryx rhamni nepalensis	Doubleday, 1847	Common brimstone
97	Gonepteryx mahaguru mahaguru	Gistel, 1857	Lesser brimstone
98	Gandaca harina assamica	Moore, 1906	Tree yellow
99	Eurema brigitta rubella	Wallace, 1867	Small grass yellow
100	Eurema laeta sikkima	Moore, 1906	Spotless grass yellow
101	Eurema andersonii andersonii	Moore, 1886	One-spot grass yellow
102	Eurema sari	Horsfield, 1829	Chocolate grass yellow
103	Eurema blanda silhetana	Wallace, 1867	Three-spot grass yellow
104	Eurema hecabe hecabe	Linnaeus, 1758	Common grass yellow
105	Colias fieldii fieldii	Menetris, 1855	Dark clouded yellow
106	Colias erate	Esper 1805	Pale clouded yellow
	Family Riodinidae		
107	Zemeros flegyas indicus	Cramer, 1780	Punchinello
108	Dodona dipoea dipoea	Hewitson, 1865	Lesser Punch
109	Dodona eugenes venox	Fruhstorfer, 1912	Tailed Punch
110	Dodona egeon	Westwood, 1851	Orange Punch
111	Dodona ouida ouida	Moore, 1865	Mixed Punch
112	Dodona adonira adonira	Hewitson, 1865	Striped Punch
113	Dodona durga	Kollar, 1844	Common Punch
114	Abisara fylla	Westwood, 1851	Dark Judy
115	Abisara neophron neophron	Hewitson, 1861	Tailed Judy
116	Abisara chela chela	de Nicéville, 1886	Spot Judy
117	Abisara echerius	Stoll, 1790	Plum Judy
118	Stiboges nymphidia	Butler, 1876	Columbine
	Family Lycaenidae		
	Subfamily Poritiinae		
	Tribe Poritiini		
119	Poritia hewitsoni hewitsoni	Moore, 1865	Common gem
	Subfamily Miletinae		
	Tribe Miletini		
120	Miletus chinensis assamensis	Doherty, 1891	Common brownie
121	Allotinus drumila drumila	Moore, 1865	Great darkie
122	Logania distanti massalia	Doherty, 1891	Dark mottle
	Tribe Tarakini		
123	Taraka hamada	Druce, 1875	Forest pierrot
	Tribe Spalgini		
124	Spalgis epeus epeus	Westwood, 1851	Apefly
125	Curetis bulis bulis	Westwood, 1851	Bright sunbeam
126	Curetis acuta naga	Evans,1954	Angled sunbeam
127	Curetis dentata dentata	Moore, 1879	Toothed sunbeam
	Subfamily Polyommatinae		
128	Phengaris atroguttata	Oberthur, 1876	Great spotted blue
129	Orthomiella pontis	Elwes, 1887	Straightwing blue
130	Petrelaea dana	de Nicéville, 1883	Dingy lineblue
131	Nacaduba pactolus continentalis	Fruhstorfer, 1916	Large four-lineblue
132	Nacaduba hermus nabo	Fruhstorfer, 1916	Pale four-lineblue
133	Nacaduba kurava euplea	Fruhstorfer, 1916	Transparent six-lineblue
134	Nacaduba beroe gythion	Fruhstorfer, 1916	Opaque six-lineblue
135	Prosotas aluta coelestis	Wood-Mason & de Nicéville, 1886	Barred lineblue
136	Prosotas nora ardates	Moore, 1874	Common lineblue
137	Prosotas bhutea bhutea	de Nicéville, 1883	Bhutya lineblue
138	Prosotas dubiosa indica	Evans, 1925	Tailless lineblue
139	Ionolyce helicon merguiana	Moore, 1884	Pointed lineblue
140	Caleta decidia	Hewitson, 1876	Angled pierrot
141	Caleta elna noliteia	Fruhstorfer, 1916	Elbowed pierrot
142	Jamides bochus bochus	Stoll, 1782	Dark cerulean
143	Jamides celeno celeno	Cramer, 1775	Common cerulean
144	Jamides elpis	Godart, 1824	Glistening cerulean
145	Jamides alecto	Felder, 1860	Metallic cerulean
146	Jamides pura	Moore, 1886	White cerulean
147	Catochrysops strabo	Fabricius, 1793	Forget-me-not
148	Catochrysops panormus	Felder, 1860	Silver forget-me-not
149	Lampides boeticus	Linnaeus, 1767	Pea blue
150	Leptotes plinius	Fabricius, 1793	Zebra blue
151	Castalius rosimon rosimon	Fabricius, 1775	Common pierrot
152	Tarucus ananda	de Nicéville, 1883	Dark pierrot
153	Zizeeria karsandra	Moore, 1865	Dark grass blue
154	Pseudozizeeria maha maha	Kollar, 1884	Pale grass blue
155	Zizina otis	Fabricius, 1787	Lesser grass blue
156	Zizula hylax	Fabricius, 1775	Tiny grass blue
157	Everes argiades tibetanus	Lorkovié, 1943	Chapman's cupid
158	Everes lacturnus assamica	Tytler, 1915	Indian cupid
159	Neopithecops zalmora zalmora	Butler, 1870	Quaker
160	Pithecops corvus	Fruhtorfer, 1919	Forest quaker
161	Azanus ubaldus	Stoll, 1782	Bright babul blue
162	Azanus jesous	Guerin & Mineville, 1847	African babul blue
163	Megisba malaya sikkima	Moore, 1884	Malayan
164	Celastrina argiolus jynteana	de Nicéville, 1883	Hill hedge blue
165	Celastrina huegelii oreoides	Evans, 1925	Large hedge blue
166	Celastrina lavendularis limbata	Moore, 1879	Plain hedge blue
167	Celastrina albidisca carna	Moore, 1883	White-disc hedge blue
168	Lestranicus transpectus	Moore, 1879	White-banded hedge blue
169	Celatoxia marginata	de Nicéville, 1884	Margined hedge blue
170	Acytolepis puspa gisca	Fruhstorfer, 1910	Common hedge blue
171	Udara dilecta	Moore, 1879	Pale hedge blue
172	Udara albocaerulea	Moore, 1879	Albocerulean
173	Udara placidula	Druce, 1895	Narrow-bordered hedge blue
174	Euchrysops cnejus cnejus	Fabricius, 1798	Gram blue
175	Albulina asiatica	Elwes, 1882	Azure mountain blue
176	Chilades lajus lajus	Stoll, 1780	Lime blue
177	Luthrodes pandava pandava	Horsfield, 1829	Plains cupid
178	Freyeria putli	Kollar, 1844	Small grass jewel
179	Anthene emolus emolus	Godart, 1823	Ciliate blue
180	Anthene lycaenina lycambes	Hewitson, 1878	Pointed ciliate blue
	Subfamily Lycaeninae		
181	Lycaena phlaeas flavens	Ford, 1924	Common copper
182	Lycaena pavana	Kollar, 1848	White-bordered copper
183	Heliophorus epicles indicus	Fruhstorfer, 1908	Common purple sapphire
184	Heliophorus oda	Hewitson, 1865	Eastern blue sapphire
185	Heliophorus brahma brahma	Moore, 1857	Golden sapphire
186	Heliophorus moorei	Hewitson, 1865	Azure sapphire
187	Heliophorus androcles	Westwood, 1851	Green sapphire
188	Heliophorus tamu tamu	Kollar, 1844	Powdery green sapphire
	Subfamily Aphnaeinae		
189	Cigaritis vulcanus vulcanus	Fabricius, 1777	Common silverline
190	Cigaritis nipalicus	Moore, 1884	Silver-grey silverline
191	Cigaritis rukma	de Nicéville, 1888	Silver-red silverline
192	Cigaritis syama peguanus	Moore, 1884	Club silverline
193	Cigaritis lohita himalayanus	Moore, 1884	Long-banded silverline
	Subfamily Theclinae		
194	Esakiozephyrus icana	Moore, 1874	Dull-green hairstreak
195	Esakiozephyrus mandara dohertyi	de Nicéville, 1889	Indian purple hairstreak
196	Esakiozephyrus camurius camurius	Murayama, 1986	Crooked hairstreak
197	Chrysozephyrus intermedius	Tytler, 1915	Intermediate hairstreak
198	Chrysozephyrus bhutanensis	Howart, 1957	Bhutan hairstreak
199	Chrysozephyrus triloka	Hannyngton, 1910	Kumaon hairstreak
200	Chrysozephyrus assamicus	Tytler, 1915	Assamese hairstreak
201	Chrysozephyrus assamica	Tytler, 1915	Silver hairstreak
202	Chrysozephyrus duma	Hewitson, 1869	Metallic green hairstreak
203	Neozephyrus suroia	Tytler, 1915	Cerulean hairstreak
204	Neozephyrus syla	Kollar, 1844	Silver hairstreak
205	Arhopala abseus indicus	Riley, 1923	Aberrant bushblue
206	Arhopala pseudocentaurus	Doubleday, 1847	Western centaur oakblue
207	Arhopala oenea	Hewitson, 1869	Hewitson's dull oakblue
208	Arhopala atrax	Hewitson, 1862	Indian oakblue
209	Arhopala amantes paella	Swinhoe, 1886	Large oakblue
210	Arhopala singla	de Nicéville, 1885	Yellow-disc oakblue
211	Arhopala bazalus	Hewitson, 1862	Powdered oakblue
212	Arhopala eumolphus eumolphus	Cramer, 1780	Green oakblue
213	Arhopala centaurus	Fabricius, 1775	Centaur oakblue
214	Arhopala paramuta paramuta	de Nicéville, 1883	Hooked oakblue
215	Arhopala rama rama	Kollar, 1842	Dark Himalayan oakblue
216	Arhopala curiosa	Evans, 1957	Bhutan oakblue
217	Arhopala fulla ignara	Riley & Godfrey, 1921	Spotless oakblue
218	Arhopala ganesa	Moore, 1857	Tailless bushblue
219	Arhopala paraganesa	de Nicéville, 1882	Dusky bushblue
220	Arhopala birmana birmana	Moore, 1883	Burmese bushblue
221	Arhopala comica	de Nicéville, 1900	Comic oakblue
222	Flos fulgida	Hewitson, 1865	Shining plushblue
223	Flos adriana	de Nicéville, 1883	Variegated plushblue
224	Flos asoka	de Nicéville, 1883	Spangled plushblue
225	Flos chinensis	C. & R. Felder,1865	Chinese plushblue
226	Flos areste	Hewitson, 1862	Tailless plushblue
227	Mota massyla	Hewitson, 1869	Saffron
228	Surendra quercetorum quercetorum	Moore, 1857	Common acacia blue
229	Zinaspa todara distorta	de Nicéville, 1887	Silverstreak acacia blue
230	Iraota timoleon timoleon	Stoll, 1790	Silverstreak blue
231	Catapaecilma major major	Druce, 1895	Common tinsel
232	Loxura atymnus continentalis	Fruhstorfer, 1912	Yamfly
233	Yasoda tripunctata	Hewitson, 1863	Branded yamfly
234	Horaga onyx onyx	Moore, 1857	Common onyx
235	Cheritra freja evansi	Cowan, 1965	Common imperial
236	Cheritrella truncipennis	de Nicéville, 1887	Truncate imperial
237	Ticherra acte	Moore, 1857	Blue imperial
238	Pratapa deva lila	Moore, 1883	White royal
239	Pratapa icetas extensa	Evans, 1925	Dark blue royal
240	Tajuria cippus cippus	Fabricius, 1798	Peacock royal
241	Tajuria illurgis	Hewitson, 1869	White royal
242	Tajuria illurgoides	de Nicéville 1890	Scarce white royal
243	Tajuria maculata	Hewitson, 1865	Spotted royal
244	Dacalana cotys	Hewitson, 1865	White-banded royal
245	Creon cleobis	Godart, 1824	Broadtail royal
246	Rachana jalindra indra	Moore, 1883	Banded royal
247	Charana mandarinus	Hewitson, 1863	Mandarin blue
248	Remelana jangala ravata	Moore, 1865	Chocolate royal
249	Ancema ctesia ctesia	Hewitson, 1865	Bi-spot royal
250	Ancema blanka minturna	Fruhstorfer, 1912	Silver royal
251	Hypolycaena erylus avantus	Fruhstorfer, 1912	Common tit
252	Chliaria othona	Hewitson, 1865	Orchid tit
253	Chliaria kina kina	Hewitson, 1869	Blue tit
254	Zeltus amasa amasa	Hewitson, 1865	Fluffy tit
255	Deudorix epijarbas amatius	Fruhstorfer, 1912	Cornelian
256	Virachola isocrates	Fabricius, 1793	Common guava blue
257	Virachola perse	Hewitson, 1863	Large guava blue
258	Artipe eryx eryx	Linnaeus, 1771	Green flash
259	Sinthusa nasaka	Horsfield, 1829	Narrow spark
260	Bindahara phocides phocides	Fabricius, 1793	Plane
261	Rapala varuna orseis	Hewitson, 1863	Indigo flash
262	Rapala manea	Hewitson, 1863	Slate flash
263	Rapala pheretima petosiris	Hewitson, 1863	Copper flash
264	Rapala iarbus	Fabricius, 1787	Indian red flash
265	Rapala buxaria	de Nicéville, 1889	Short flash
266	Bidaspa nissa ranta	Swinhoe, 1897	Common flash
	Family Nymphalidae		
	Subfamily Danainae		
	Tribe Danaini		
267	Parantica aglea melanoides	Moore, 1883	Glassy tiger
268	Parantica agleoides	Moore, 1883	Dark glassy tiger
269	Parantica sita	Kollar, 1844	Chestnut tiger
270	Parantica pedonga	Talbot, 1943	Talbot's chestnut tiger
271	Parantica melaneus plantenston	Fruhstorfer, 1910	Chocolate tiger
272	Tirumala limniace	Moore, 1880	Blue tiger
273	Tirumala septentrionis	Butler, 1874	Dark blue tiger
274	Danaus genutia	Cramer, 1779	Common tiger
275	Danaus melanippus	Cramer, 1777	White tiger
276	Danaus chrysippus	Linnaeus, 1758	Plain tiger
277	Ideopsis similis	Linnaeus, 1758	Blue glassy tiger
	Tribe Euploeini		
278	Euploea sylvester	C. & R. Felder, 1865	Double-branded crow
279	Euploea mulciber mulciber	Cramer, 1777	Striped blue crow
280	Euploea midamus	Linnaeus, 1758	Spotted blue crow
281	Euploea klugii	Horsfield & Moore, 1857	King crow
282	Euploea radamanthus	Fabricius, 1793	Magpie crow
283	Euploea doubledayi	C. & R. Felder, 1865	Striped black crow
284	Euploea algea deione	Westwood, 1848	Long-branded blue crow
285	Euploea core core	Cramer, 1780	Common Indian crow
	Subfamily Libytheinae		
286	Libythea lepita lepita	Moore, 1857	Common beak
287	Libythea myrrha sanguinalis	Fruhstorfer, 1898	Club beak
288	Libythea celtis	Laicharting 1782	European beak
	Subfamily Satyrinae		
	Tribe Satyrini		
289	Melanitis leda ismene	Cramer, 1775	Common evening brown
290	Melanitis phedima bela	Moore, 1857	Dark evening brown
291	Melanitis zitenius zitenius	Herbst, 1796	Great evening brown
292	Cyllogenes janetae	de Nicéville, 1887	Scarce evening brown
293	Elymnias hypermnestra undularis	Drury, 1773	Common palmfly
294	Elymnias malelas	Hewitson, 1863	Spotted palmfly
295	Elymnias patna	Westwood, 1851	Blue-striped palmfly
296	Elymnias vasudeva vasudeva	Moore, 1857	Jezebel palmfly
297	Mycalesis anaxias aemate	Fruhstorfer, 1911	Whitebar bushbrown
298	Mycalesis francisca sanatana	Moore, 1857	Lilacine bushbrown
299	Mycalesis perseus blasieus	Fabricius, 1798	Common bushbrown
300	Mycalesis mineus	Linnaeus, 1767	Darkbrand bushbrown
301	Mycalesis visala visala	Moore, 1857	Longbrand bushbrown
302	Mycalesis suaveolens	Wood Mason & de Nicéville, 1883	Wood-Mason's bushbrown
303	Mycalesis mestra	Hewitson, 1862	White-edged bushbrown
304	Mycalesis heri	Moore, 1857	Moore's bushbrown
305	Mycalesis malsara	Moore, 1857	Whiteline bushbrown
306	Mycalesis mamerta	Stoll, 1780	Blindeye bushbrown
307	Mycalesis lepcha lepcha	Moore, 1880	Lepcha bushbrown
308	Mycalesis nicotia	Westwood, 1850	Bright-eyed bushbrown
309	Penthema lisarda	Doubleday, 1845	Yellow kaiser
310	Lethe sidonis	Hewitson, 1863	Common woodbrown
311	Lethe nicetella	de Nicéville, 1887	Small woodbrown
312	Lethe maitrya	de Nicéville, 1880	Barred woodbrown
313	Lethe nicetas	Hewitson, 1863	Yellow woodbrown
314	Lethe tristigmata	Elwes, 1887	Spotted mystic
315	Lethe ocellata lyneus	de Nicéville, 1897	Dismal mystic
316	Lethe jalaurida	de Nicéville, 1880	Small silverfork
317	Lethe moelleri	Elwes, 1887	Moeller's silverfork
318	Lethe atkinsonia	Hewitson, 1876	Small goldenfork
319	Lethe goalpara gana	Talbot, 1947	Large goldenfork
320	Lethe sura	Doubleday, 1849	Lilacfork
321	Lethe dura gammiei	Moore, 1892	Scarce lilacfork
322	Lethe baladeva	Moore, 1865	Treble silverstripe
323	Lethe ramadeva	de Nicéville, 1888	Single silverstripe
324	Lethe confusa confusa	Aurivillius, 1898	Banded treebrown
325	Lethe europa niladana	Fruhstorfer, 1911	Bamboo treebrown
326	Lethe rohria rohria	Fabricius, 1787	Common treebrown
327	Lethe mekara mekara	Moore, 1857	Common red forester
328	Lethe chandica	Moore, 1857	Angled red forester
329	Lethe margaritae	Elwes, 1882	Bhutan treebrown
330	Lethe isana dinarbus	Hewitson, 1863	Common forester
331	Lethe brisanda	de Nicéville, 1886	Dark forester
332	Lethe serbonis bhutya	Talbot, 1947	Brown forester
333	Lethe vindhya	C. Felder, 1859	Black forester
334	Lethe kansa	Moore, 1857	Bamboo forester
335	Lethe sinorix	Hewitson, 1863	Tailed red forester
336	Lethe scanda	Moore, 1857	Blue forester
337	Lethe latiaris	Hewitson, 1863	Pale forester
338	Lethe gulnihal gulnihal	de Nicéville, 1887	Dull forester
339	Lethe bhairava	Moore, 1857	Rusty forester
340	Lethe verma sintica	Fruhstorfer, 1911	Straight-banded treebrown
341	Neope pulaha	Moore, 1865	Veined labyrinth
342	Neope pulahoides	Moore, 1892	Assam veined labyrinth
343	Neope pulahina	Evans, 1924	Scarce labyrinth
344	Neope bhadra	Moore, 1865	Tailed labyrinth
345	Neope yama yama	Moore, 1857	Dusky labyrinth
346	Chonala masoni	Moore, 1892	Chumbi wall
347	Rhaphicera satricus	Doubleday, 1849	Large tawny wall
348	Rhaphicera moorei	Butler, 1867	Small tawny wall
349	Orinoma damaris	Gray, 1846	Tigerbrown
350	Ethope himachala	Moore, 1857	Dusky diadem
351	Neorina hilda	Westwood, 1850	Yellow owl
352	Orsotriaena medus meudus	Fabricius, 1775	Nigger
353	Ragadia crisilda	Hewitson, 1862	Striped ringlet
354	Ypthima nareda	Kollar, 1844	Large three-ring
355	Ypthima newara	Elwes & Edwards, 1893	Newar three-ring
356	Ypthima asterope	Klug, 1832	Common three-ring
357	Ypthima huebneri	Kirby, 1871	Common four-ring
358	Ypthima avanta	Moore, 1882	Jewel four-ring
359	Ypthima baldus baldus	Fabricius, 1775	Common five-ring
360	Ypthima sakra sakra	Moore, 1858	Himalayan five-ring
361	Ypthima parasakra	Eliot, 1987	Himalayan four-ring
362	Ypthima lisandra	Cramer, 1782	Straight five-ring
363	Ypthima persimilis	Elwes & Edwards, 1893	Manipur fivering
364	Ypthima nikaea	Moore, 1874	West Himalayan five-ring
365	Ypthima ceylonica	Hewitson, 1865	White four-ring
366	Ypthima confusa	Shirozu & Shima 1977	Confusing three-ring
367	Ypthima lycus	de Nicéville, 1889	Plain three-ring
368	Ypthima narasingha	Moore, 1857	Mottled argus
369	Callerebia nirmala	Moore, 1882	Common argus
370	Callerebia scanda opima	Moore, 1882	Pallid argus
371	Callerebia annada annada	Seitz, 1908	Ringed argus
372	Callerebia hybrida	Butler, 1880	Hybrid argus
373	Paroeneis pumilus bicolor	Seitz, 1908	Mountain satyr
374	Aulocera brahminus	Blanchard, 1844	Narrow-banded satyr
375	Aulocera padma chumbica	Moore, 1892	Great satyr
376	Aulocera loha loha	Doherty, 1886	Doherty's satyr
377	Aulocera swaha swaha	Kollar, 1844	Common satyr
378	Aulocera saraswati	Moore, 1892	Striated satyr
379	Aulocera sybillina	Oberthur, 1890	
	Subfamily Calinaginae		
380	Calinaga buddha	Moore, 1857	Freak
	Subfamily Amathusiinae		
	Tribe Faunidini		
381	Faunis canens	Hubner, 1826	Common faun
382	Faunis eumeus	Drury, 1773	Large faun
383	Melanocyme faunula faunoloides	de Nicéville, 1895	Pallid faun
384	Aemona amathusia	Hewitson, 1867	Yellow dryad
385	Stichophthalma nourmahal	Westwood, 1851	Chocolate jungle-queen
386	Stichophthalma camadeva	Westwood, 1848	Northern jungle-queen
	Tribe Amathusiini		
387	Amathuxidia amythaon	Doubleday, 1847	Kohinoor
388	Thaumantis diores	Doubleday, 1845	Jungle-glory
	Tribe Discophorini		
389	Discophora sondaica zal	Westwood, 1851	Common duffer
390	Discophora timora	Westwood, 1850	Great duffer
391	Enispe cycnus	Westwood, 1851	Blue caliph
392	Enispe euthymius	Doubleday, 1845	Red caliph
	Subfamily Acraeinae		
	Tribe Acraeini		
393	Acraea violae	Fabricius, 1793	Tawny coster
394	Acraea issoria issoria	Hubner, 1819	Yellow coster
	Tribe Cethosiini		
395	Cethosia biblis tisamena	Fruhstorfer, 1912	Red lacewing
396	Cethosia cyane cyane	Drury, 1770	Leopard lacewing
	Subfamily Nymphalinae		
	Tribe Biblidini		
397	Ariadne ariadne pallidor	Fruhstorfer,1899	Angled castor
398	Ariadne merione	Cramer, 1777	Common castor
	Tribe Argynnini		
399	Argynnis hyperbius hyperbius	(Linnaeus, 1763)	Indian fritillary
400	Argynnis childreni childreni	Gray, 1831	Large silverstripe
401	Issoria lathonia isaea	Doubleday, 1846	Queen of Spain fritillary
402	Issoria gemmata	Butler, 1881	Gem silverspot
403	Issoria altissima	(Elwes, 1882)	Mountain silverspot
	Tribe Heliconiinae		
404	Phalanta phalantha phalantha	Drury, 1773	Common leopard
405	Cupha erymanthis lotis	Sulzer, 1776	Rustic
406	Vagrans egista sinha	Kollar, 1844	Vagrant
407	Vindula erota erota	Fabricius, 1793	Cruiser
408	Cirrochroa aoris aoris	Doubleday, 1847	Large yeoman
409	Cirrochroa tyche mithila	Moore, 1872	Common yeoman
	Tribe Nymphalini		
410	Melitaea arcesia sikkimensis	Moore, 1901	Blackvein fritillary
411	Symbrenthia lilaea khasiana	Moore, 1875	Common jester
412	Symbrenthia hypselis cotanda	Moore, 1874	Spotted jester
413	Symbrenthia niphanda niphanda	Moore, 1872	Bluetail jester
414	Symbrenthia brabira sivokana	Moore, 1899	Himalayan jester
415	Symbrenthia hippocles	Hewitson, 1864	Common jester
416	Nymphalis antiopa	Linnaeus, 1758	Camberwell beauty
417	Aglais ladakensis	Moore, 1878	Ladak tortoiseshell
418	Aglais urticae	Linnaeus, 1758	Small tortoiseshell
419	Aglais caschmiriensis aesis	Fruhstorfer, 1912	Indian tortoiseshell
420	Kaniska canace canace	Linnaeus, 1763	Blue admiral
421	Polygonia egea	Cramer, 1775	Eastern comma
422	Polygonia c-album	Linnaeus, 1758	Nepal comma
423	Vanessa cardui	Linnaeus, 1758	Painted lady
424	Vanessa indica indica	Herbst, 1794	Indian red admiral
425	Junonia hierta hireta	Fabricius, 1798	Yellow pansy
426	Junonia orithya ocyla	Hubner, 1819	Blue pansy
427	Junonia lemonias lemonias	Linnaeus, 1758	Lemon pansy
428	Junonia almana almana	Linnaeus, 1758	Peacock pansy
429	Junonia atlites atlites	Linnaeus, 1763	Grey pansy
430	Junonia iphita iphita	Cramer, 1779	Chocolate pansy
431	Kallima horsfieldii	Kollar, 1844	Blue oakleaf
432	Kallima inachus inachus	Boisduval, 1836	Orange oakleaf
433	Kallima knyvetti	de Nicéville, 1886	Scarce blue oakleaf
434	Doleschallia bisaltide indica	Moore, 1899	Autumn leaf
435	Hypolimnas misippus	Linnaeus, 1764	Danaid eggfly
436	Hypolimnas bolina	Linnaeus, 1758	Great eggfly
	Tribe Marpesiini		
437	Cyrestis cocles	Fabricius, 1787	Marbled map
438	Cyrestis thyodamas thyodamas	Doyere, 1840	Common map
439	Chersonesia risa	Doubleday, 1848	Common maplet
	Tribe Limenitidini		
440	Neptis clinia susruta	Moore, 1872	Clear sailer
441	Neptis sappho astola	Moore, 1872	Pallas's sailer
442	Neptis hylas	Linnaeus, 1758	Common sailer
443	Neptis soma soma	Moore, 1858	Creamy sailer
444	Neptis jumbah	Moore, 1857	Chestnut-streaked sailer
445	Neptis pseudovikasi	Moore, 1899	False dingy sailer
446	Neptis miah miah	Moore, 1857	Small yellow sailer
447	Neptis sankara	Kollar, 1844	Broad-banded sailer
448	Neptis cartica cartica	Moore, 1872	Plain sailer
449	Neptis magadha	C. & R. Felder, 1867	Spotted sailer
450	Neptis anjana	Moore, 1881	Rich sailer
451	Neptis ananta ochracea	Evans, 1924	Yellow sailer
452	Neptis zaida bhutanica	Tytler, 1926	Pale green sailer
453	Neptis armandia melba	Evans, 1912	Variegated sailer
454	Neptis radha	Moore, 1857	Great yellow sailer
455	Neptis narayana	Moore, 1858	Broadstick sailer
456	Neptis manasa manasa	Moore, 1858	Pale hockeystick sailer
457	Neptis nycteus	de Nicéville, 1890	Hockeystick sailer
458	Neptis yerburyi	Butler, 1886	Yerbury's sailer
459	Phaedyma aspasia	Leech, 1890	Great hockeystick sailer
460	Phaedyma columella ophiana	Moore, 1872	Short-banded sailer
461	Lassipa viraja viraja	Moore, 1872	Yellow jack sailer
462	Pantoporia hordonia hordonia	Stoll, 1790	Common lascar
463	Pantoporia sandaka davidsoni	Eliot, 1969	Broad-striped lascar
464	Athyma perius perius	Linnaeus, 1758	Common sergeant
465	Athyma asura asura	Moore, 1857	Studded sergeant
466	Athyma pravara	Moore, 1857	Unbroken sergeant
467	Athyma jina jina	Moore, 1858	Bhutan sergeant
468	Athyma kanwa	Moore, 1858	Dot-dash sergeant
469	Athyma ranga ranga	Moore, 1857	Blackvein sergeant
470	Athyma opalina opalina	Kollar, 1844	Hill sergeant
471	Athyma selenophora selenophora	Kollar, 1844	Staff sergeant
472	Athyma zeroca	Moore, 1872	Small staff sergeant
473	Athyma cama cama	Moore, 1858	Orange staff sergeant
474	Athyma nefte inara	Doubleday, 1850	Colour sergeant
475	Moduza procris procris	Cramer, 1777	Commander
476	Parasarpa zayla zayla	Doubleday, 1848	Bicolour commodore
477	Parasarpa dudu dudu	Doubleday, 1848	White commodore
478	Sumalia zulema	Doubleday, 1848	Scarce white commodore
479	Sumalia daraxa	Doubleday, 1848	Green commodore
480	Auzakia danava	Moore, 1857	Commodore
481	Lebadea martha martha	Fabricius, 1787	Knight
482	Neurosigma siva siva	Westwood, 1850	Panther
483	Abrota ganga ganga	Moore, 1857	Sergeant-major
484	Tanaecia julii appiades	Ménétriés, 1857	Common earl
485	Tanaecia jahnu	Moore, 1857	Plain earl
486	Tanaecia lepidea lepidea	Butler, 1868	Grey count
487	Dophla evelina derna	Kollar, 1848	Red-spot duke
488	Euthalia durga durga	Moore, 1857	Blue duke
489	Euthalia monina kesava	Moore, 1859	Powdered baron
490	Euthalia telchinia	Ménétriés, 1857	Blue baron
491	Euthalia aconthea	Cramer, 1777	Common baron
492	Euthalia phemius	Doubleday, 1848	White-edged blue baron
493	Euthalia lubentina	Cramer, 1777	Gaudy baron
494	Euthalia franciae	Gray, 1846	French duke
495	Euthalia duda	Staudinger, 1886	Blue duchess
496	Euthalia nara nara	Moore, 1859	Bronze duke
497	Euthalia sahadeva	Moore, 1859	Green duke
498	Euthalia patala	Kollar, 1844	Grand duchess
499	Euthalia amphifascia	Tytler, 1940	
500	Euthalia alpheda jama	C & R Felder, 1867	Streaked baron
501	Lexias cyanipardus	Butler, 1868	Great archduke
502	Lexias dirtea khasiana	Swinhoe, 1893	Dark archduke
503	Lexias pardalis	Moore, 1878	Yellow-tipped archduke
	Tribe Pseudergolini		
504	Pseudergolis wedah wedah	Kollar, 1844	Tabby
505	Stibochiona nicea nicea	Gray, 1846	Popinjay
506	Dichorragia nesimachus	Doyère, 1840	Constable
	Tribe Apaturini		
507	Rohana parvata	Moore, 1857	Brown prince
508	Rohana parisatis parisatis	Westwood, 1850	Black prince
509	Chitoria sordida	Moore, 1865	Sordid emperor
510	Chitoria ulupi ulupi	Doherty, 1889	Tawny emperor
511	Mimathyma ambica namouna	Doubleday, 1845	Indian purple emperor
512	Mimathyma bhavana	Moore, 1881	Restricted purple emperor
513	Mimathyma chevana	Moore, 1865	Sergeant emperor
514	Dilipa morgiana	Westwood, 1850	Golden emperor
515	Sephisa dichroa	Kollar, 1844	Western courtier
516	Sephisa chandra chandra	Moore, 1858	Eastern courtier
517	Helcyra hemina	Hewitson, 1864	White emperor
518	Herona marathus marathus	Doubleday, 1848	Pasha
519	Euripus consimilis	Westwood, 1850	Painted courtesan
520	Euripus nyctelius	Doubleday, 1845	Courtesan
521	Hestina persimilis	Westwood, 1850	Siren
522	Hestina nama nama	Doubleday, 1844	Circe
	Tribe Charaxini		
523	Polyura athamas athamas	Drury, 1770	Common nawab
524	Polyura arja	C. & R. Felder, 1866	Pallid nawab
525	Polyura eudamippus	Doubleday, 1843	Great nawab
526	Polyura dolon	Westwood, 1848	Stately nawab
527	Polyura narcaea	Hewitson 1854	Chinese nawab
528	Charaxes bernardus	Fabricius, 1793	Tawny rajah
529	Charaxes marmax	Westwood, 1847	Yellow rajah
530	Charaxes kahruba	Moore, 1895	Variegated rajah
531	Charaxes solon	Fabricius, 1793	Black rajah
	Family Hesperiidae		
	Subfamily Coeliadinae		
532	Burara oedipodea	Swainson, 1882	Branded orange awlet
533	Burara jaina jaina	Moore, 1865	Orange awlet
534	Burara amara	Moore, 1865	Small green awlet
535	Burara harisa harisa	Mabille 1876	Bengal harisa orange awlet
536	Burara vasutana	Mabille 1876	Green awlet
537	Bibasis sena sena	Moore, 1865	Orangetail awl
538	Hasora anura anura	de Nicéville, 1889	Slate awl
539	Hasora chromus	Cramer, 1780	Common banded awl
540	Hasora taminatus bhavara	Fruhstorfer, 1911	White-banded awl
541	Hasora badra badra	Moore, 1857	Common awl
542	Hasora vitta indica	Evans, 1932	Plain banded awl
543	Badamia exclamationis	Fabricius, 1775	Brown awl
544	Choaspes benjaminii japonicas	Murry, 1875	Indian awlking
545	Choaspes xanthopogon	Kollar, 1844	Similar awlking
546	Choaspes furcata	Evans, 1932	Hooked awlking
	Subfamily Pyrginae		
	Tribe Celaenorrhinini		
547	Capila lidderdali	Elwes, 1888	Lidderdale's dawnfly
548	Capila zennara	Moore, 1865	Pale striped dawnfly
549	Capila jayadeva	Moore, 1865	Striped dawnfly
550	Lobocla liliana	Atkinson, 1871	Marbled flat
551	Celaenorrhinus flavocincta	de Nicéville, 1887	Bhutan flat
552	Celaenorrhinus pyrrha	de Nicéville, 1889	Double spotted flat
553	Celaenorrhinus pulomaya	Moore, 1865	Multispotted flat
554	Celaenorrhinus plagifera	de Nicéville, 1889	de Nicéville's spotted flat
555	Celaenorrhinus leucocera	Kollar, 1844	Common spotted flat
556	Celaenorrhinus putra	Moore, 1865	Bengal spotted flat
557	Celaenorrhinus munda munda	Moore, 1884	Himalayan spotted flat
558	Celaenorrhinus nigricans	de Nicéville, 1885	Small-banded flat
559	Celaenorrhinus badius	Bell, 1930	Scarce banded flat
560	Celaenorrhinus dhanada	Moore, 1865	Himalayan yellow-banded flat
561	Celaenorrhinus ratna tyleri	Evans, 1926	Ratna flat
562	Celaenorrhinus maculicornis	Elwes & Edwards 1897	Elwes spotted flat
563	Celaenorrhinus aurivittatus	Moore 1879	Dark yellow-banded flat
564	Celaenorrhinus aurivittata aurivittata	Moore 1866	Himalayan yellow-banded flat
	Tribe Tagiadini		
565	Sarangesa dasahara dasahara	Moore, 1865	Common small flat
566	Pseudocoladenia dan fabia	Evans, 1949	Fulvous pied flat
567	Pseudocoladenia festa	Evans, 1949	Naga pied flat
568	Pseudocoladenia fatua	Evans, 1949	Sikkim pied flat
569	Coladenia indrani indrani	Moore, 1865	Tricolour pied flat
570	Coladenia hoenei	Evans, 1931	Large spot pied flat
571	Coladenia agni	Moore1884	Brown pied flat
572	Seseria dohertyi dohertyi	Watson, 1893	Himalayan white flat
573	Seseria sambara	Moore, 1865	Sikkim white flat
574	Chamunda chamunda	Moore, 1865	Olive flat
575	Gerosis phisara phisara	Moore, 1884	Dusky yellow-breast flat
576	Gerosis bhagava bhagava	Moore, 1865	Common yellow-breast flat
577	Gerosis sinica narada	Moore, 1884	White yellow-breast flat
578	Tagiades japetus	Stoll, 1782	Common snow flat
579	Tagiades gana athos	Plötz, 1884	Suffused snow flat
580	Tagiades parra gala	Evans, 1949	Large snow flat
581	Tagiades litigiosa litigiosa	Möschler, 1878	Water snow flat
582	Tagiades menaka	Moore, 1865	Spotted snow flat
583	Satarupa zulla zulla	Tytler 1915	Himalayan equal white flat
584	Mooreana trichoneura	C & R Felder 1860	Yellow flat
585	Odontoptilum angulata angulata	Felder, 1862	Chestnut angle
586	Caprona agama	Moore, 1857	Spotted angle
587	Dharpa hanria	Moore 1866	Hairy angle
588	Ctenoptilum vasava vasava	Moore 1866	Tawny angle
589	Apostictopterus fuliginosus curiosa	Swinhoe, 1917	Naga giant hopper
	Tribe Pyrgini		
590	Pyrgus cashmirensis cashmirensis	Moore, 1874	Kashmir skipper
591	Spialia galba	Fabricius, 1793	Indian skipper
592	Cartercephalus silvicola	de Nicéville, 1886	Northern chequered skipper
	Subfamily Hesperiinae		
	Tribe Heteropterini		
593	Carterocephalus houangty bootia	Evans, 1949	Bhutan hopper
594	Carterocephalus avanti avanti	de Nicéville, 1886	Orange-and-silver hopper
	Tribe Astictopterini		
595	Ochus subvittatus	Moore, 1878	Tiger hopper
596	Baracus vittatus septentrionum	Wood-Mason & de Nicéville, 1887	Hedge hopper
597	Sebastonyma dolopia	Hewitson, 1868	Tufted ace
598	Sovia grahami	Evans, 1926	Graham's ace
599	Sovia lucasii separate	Moore, 1882	Chequered ace
600	Pedesta masuriensis masuriensis	Moore, 1878	Mussoorie bush bob
601	Pedesta pandita	de Nicéville, 1885	Brown bush bob
602	Thoressa hyrie	de Nicéville, 1891	Largespot plain ace
603	Thoressa cerata	Hewitson 1876	Northern spotted ace
604	Thoressa aina aina	de Nicéville 1890	Garhwal ace
605	Thoressa gupta	de Nicéville 1886	Olive ace
606	Aeromachus kali	de Nicéville, 1885	Blue-spotted scrub hopper
607	Aeromachus stigmatus stigmatus	Moore, 1878	Veined scrub hopper
608	Halpe kumara	de Nicéville, 1885	Plain ace
609	Halpe porus	Mabille, 1878	Moore's ace
610	Halpe homolea filda	Evans 1937	Absent ace
611	Halpe arcuata	Evans 1937	Overlapped ace
612	Halpe sikkima	Mabille 1882	Sikkim ace
613	Halpe zema zema	Hewitson 1877	Banded ace
614	Pithauria stramineipennis	Wood-Mason & de Nicéville, 1886	Light straw ace
615	Astictopterus jamaolivascens	Moore, 1878	Forest hopper
	Tribe Ancistroidini		
616	Iambrix salsala salsala	Moore, 1865	Chestnut bob
617	Koruthaialos butleri butleri	Moore, 1882	Dark velvet bob
618	Ancistroides nigrita diocles	Moore, 1865	Chocolate demon
619	Notocrypta paralysos asawa	Fruhstorfer, 1911	Common banded demon
620	Notocrypta curvifascia	C. & R. Felder, 1862	Restricted demon
621	Notocrypta feisthamelii alysos	Moore, 1866	Spotted demon
622	Udaspes folus	Cramer, 1775	Grass demon
	Tribe Plastingiini		
623	Arnetta atkinsoni	Moore, 1878	Atkinson's bob
624	Suastus gremius	Fabricius, 1798	Indian palm bob
625	Suastus minuta aditia	Evans, 1943	Small palm bob
626	Cupitha purreea	Moore, 1877	Wax dart
627	Hyarotis adrastus praba	Moore, 1865	Tree flitter
628	Zographetus satwa	de Nicéville 1884	Purple and gold flitter
629	Matapa aria	Moore, 1865	Common redeye
630	Matapa sasivarna	Moore, 1865	Black-veined redeye
631	Matapa purpurescens	Elwes & Edwards, 1897	Purple redeye
632	Erionota thrax	Linnaeus, 1767	Palm redeye
633	Creteus cyrina	Hewitson, 1876	Nonsuch palmer
	Tribe Hesperiini		
634	Ochlodes brahma	Moore, 1878	Himalayan darter
635	Sancus fuligo	Mabille, 1876	Coon
	Tribe Taractrocerini		
636	Taractrocera danna	Moore, 1865	Himalayan grass dart
637	Taractrocera maevius	Fabricius, 1793	Common grass dart
638	Taractrocera luzonensis	Staudinger 1889	Veined grass dart
639	Oriens goloides	Moore, 1881	Ceylon dartlet
640	Oriens gola	Moore, 1877	Common dartlet
641	Potanthus rectifasciatus rectifasciatus	Elwes & Edwards, 1897	Branded dart
642	Potanthus pallida	Evans, 1932	Pallid dart
643	Potanthus pseudomaesa clio	Evans, 1932	Indian dart
644	Potanthus juno	Evans, 1932	Burmese dart
645	Potanthus dara	Kollar, 1842	Himalayan dart
646	Potanthus confucius dushta	Fruhstorfer, 1911	Chinese dart
647	Potanthus nesta nesta	Evans, 1934	Sikkim dart
648	Potanthus palnia palnia	Evans, 1914	Palni dart
649	Potanthus ganda ganda	Fruhstorfer, 1911	Sumatran dart
650	Potanthus trachala	Mabille 1878	Broad bident dart
651	Cephrenes acalle oceanica	Hopffer 1874	Plain palm dart
652	Telicota colon colon	Fabricius, 1775	Common palm dart
653	Telicota bambusae bambusae	Moore, 1878	Dark palm dart
	Tribe Gegenini		
654	Parnara guttatus guttatus	Bremer & Grey, 1853	Straight swift
655	Parnara bada bada	Moore, 1878	Grey swift
656	Parnara ganga	Evans 1937	Continental swift
657	Borbo cinnara	Wallace, 1866	Rice swift
658	Borbo bevani	Moore, 1878	Bevan's swift
659	Pelopidas sinensis	Mabile, 1877	Chinese swift
660	Pelopidas subochraceus subochraceus	Moore, 1878	Large branded swift
661	Pelopidas mathias	Fabricius, 1798	Small branded swift
662	Pelopidas assamensis	de Nicéville, 1882	Great swift
663	Pelopidas conjuncta conjuncta	Herrich-Schäffer, 1869	Conjoined swift
664	Pelopidas agna agna	Moore 1866	Little branded swift
665	Polytremis lubricans lubricans	Herrich-Schäffer, 1869	Contiguous swift
666	Polytremis eltola eltola	Hewitson, 1869	Yellowspot swift
667	Baoris farri	Moore, 1878	Paintbrush swift
668	Caltoris tulsi tulsi	de Nicéville, 1883	Purple swift
669	Caltoris kumara moorei	Evans, 1926	Blank swift
670	Caltoris brunnea caere	de Nicéville, 1876	Dark branded swift
