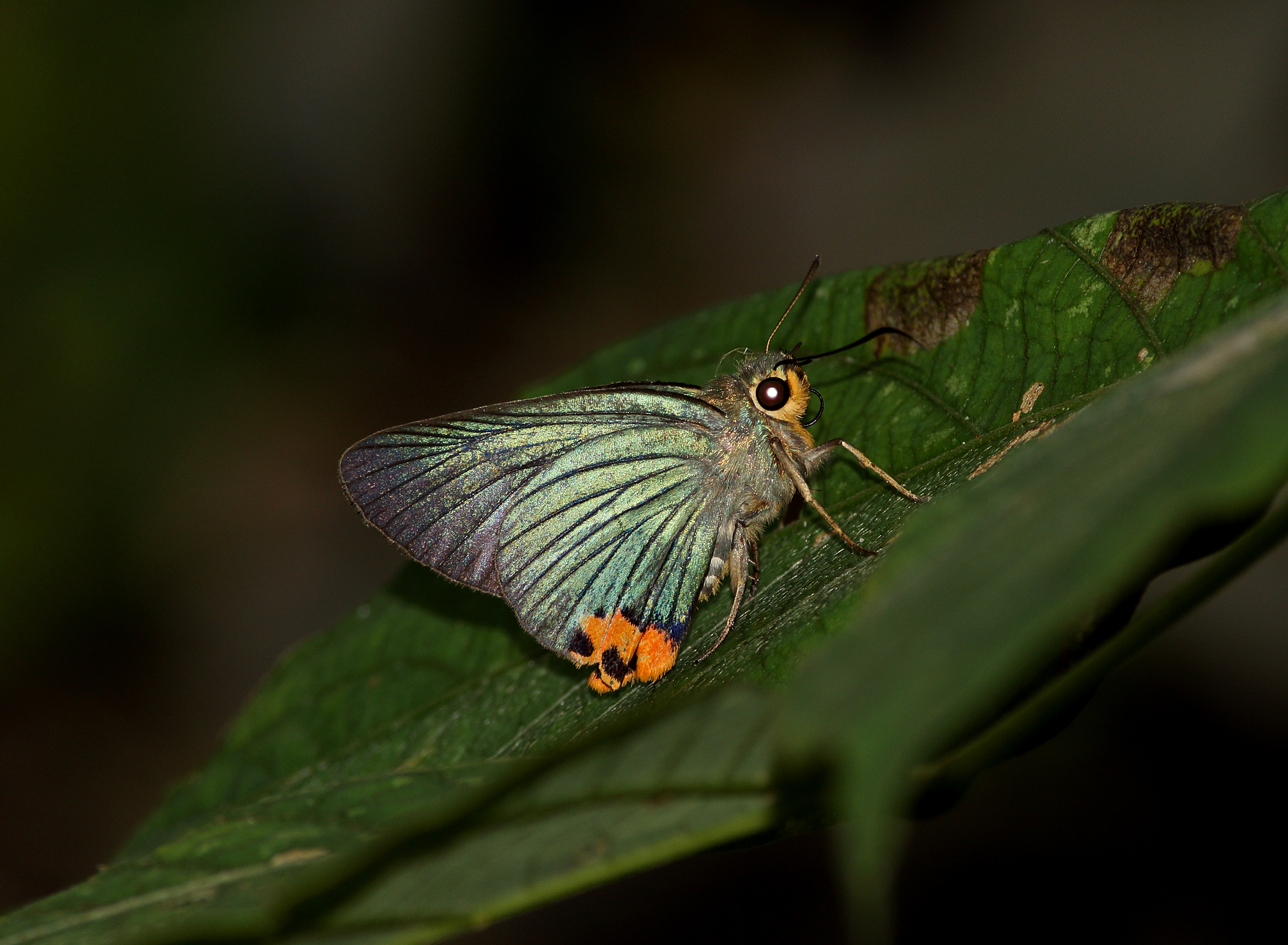

Scientific classification
- Domain: Eukaryota
- Kingdom: Animalia
- Phylum: Arthropoda
- Class: Insecta
- Order: Lepidoptera
- Family: Hesperiidae
- Genus: Choaspes
- Species: C. furcata

Binomial name
- Choaspes furcata Evans, 1932

= Choaspes furcata =

Species of insect

Choaspes furcata, the hooked awlking, (Note: The species is considered to be furcata by LepIndex, and as furcatus by TOLWeb. Savela gives it as furcatus without appropriate reference for the change. Accordingly it is being retained as furcata, with furcatus as redirect, pending the availability of a proper reference.) is a butterfly belonging to the family Hesperiidae.

== Range ==
The hooked awlking ranges in India along the Himalayas from Kashmir to Nepal, Sikkim and Assam onto Myanmar and western China and possibly Borneo.

== Status ==
William Harry Evans had considered this taxon as a subspecies of plateni and given its status in India as rare.

== See also ==
- Coeliadinae
- Hesperiidae
- List of butterflies of India (Coeliadinae)
- List of butterflies of India (Hesperiidae)
