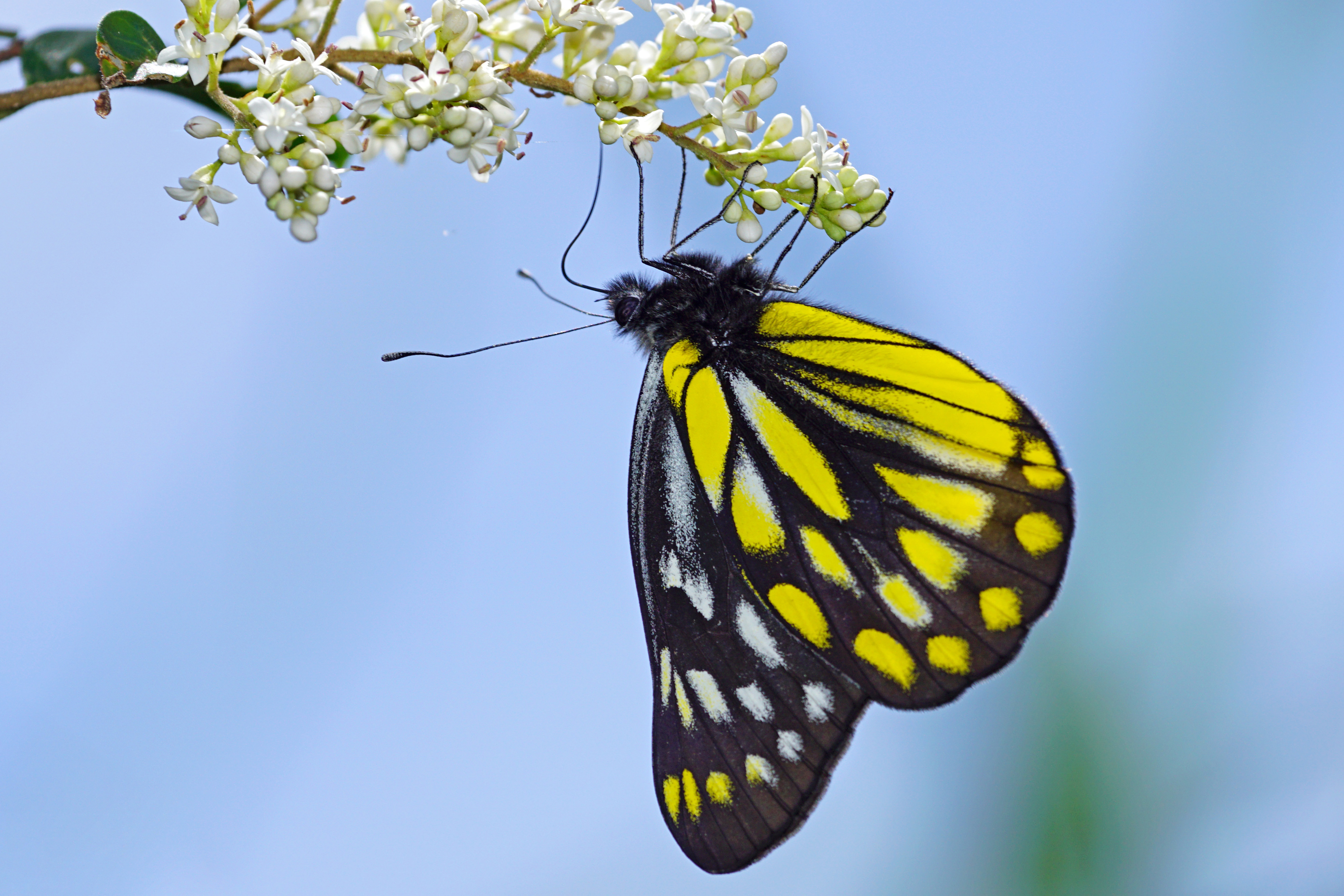
- Delias berinda wilemani

Scientific classification
- Kingdom: Animalia
- Phylum: Arthropoda
- Class: Insecta
- Order: Lepidoptera
- Family: Pieridae
- Genus: Delias
- Species: D. berinda

Binomial name
- Delias berinda (Moore, 1872)

= Delias berinda =

Dark Jezebel

Species of butterfly

Delias berinda, the dark Jezebel is a medium-sized butterfly of the family Pieridae, that is, the yellows and whites. The species was first described by Frederic Moore in 1872 and originally named Thyca berinda.

== See also ==
- List of butterflies of India
- List of butterflies of India (Pieridae)
