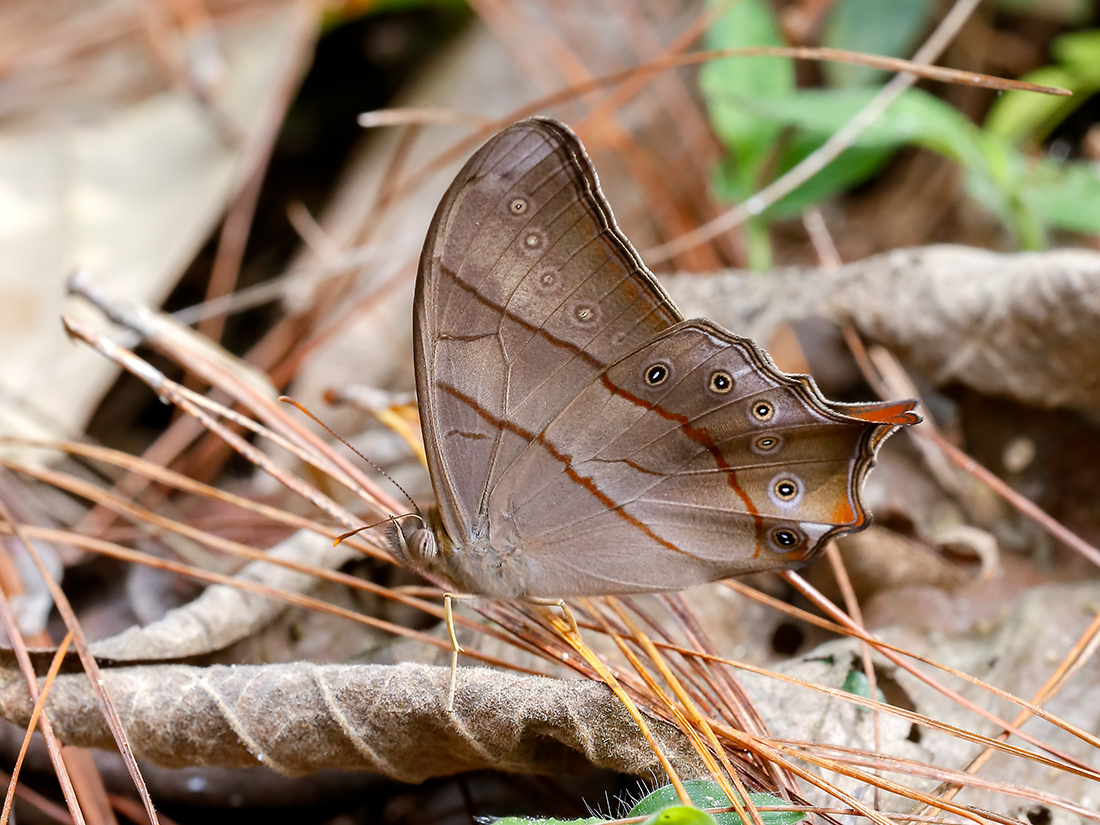
- Ventral view of bamboo forester butterfly
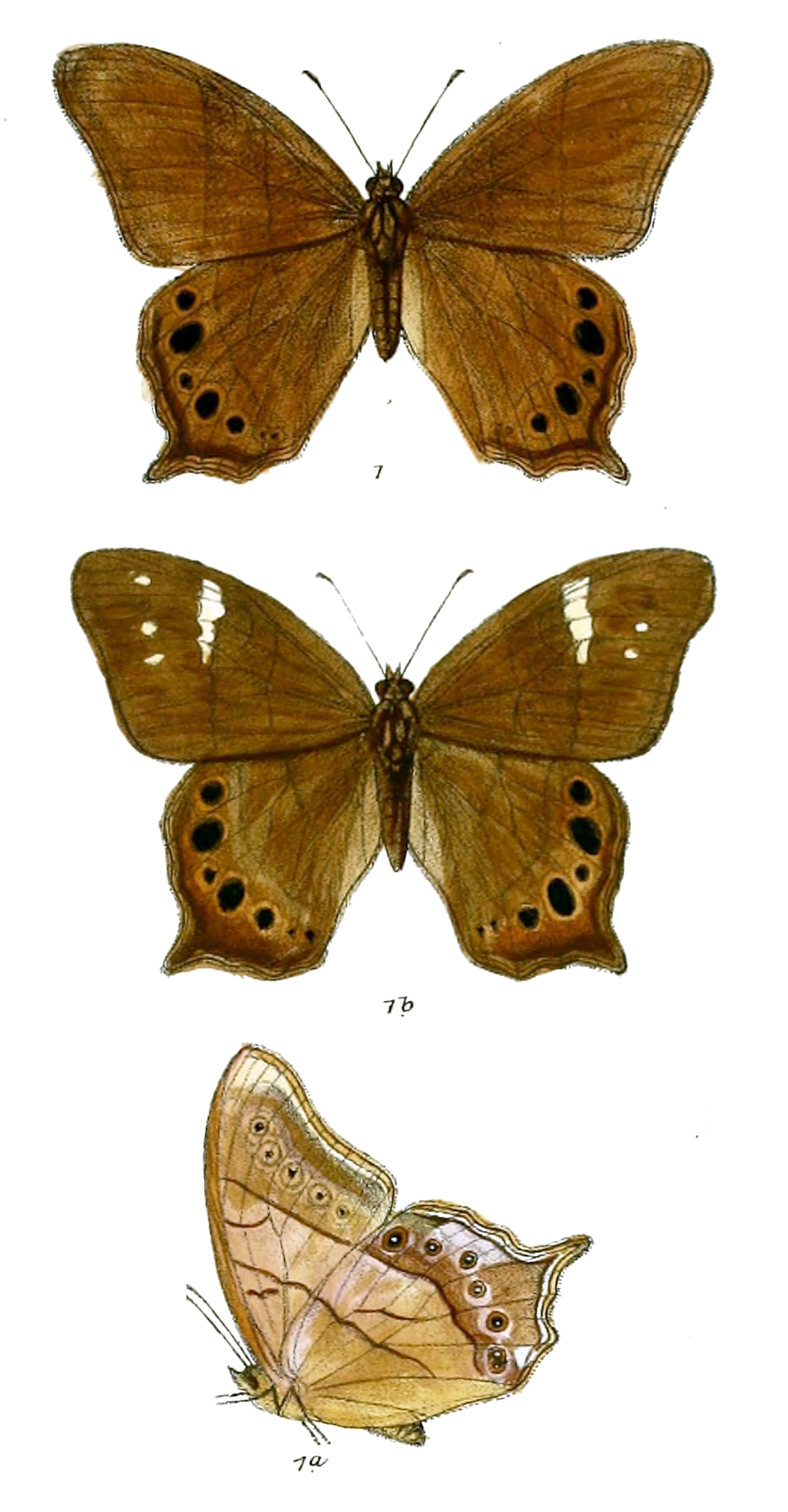
- Lethe kansa in Lepidoptera Indica

Scientific classification
- Domain: Eukaryota
- Kingdom: Animalia
- Phylum: Arthropoda
- Class: Insecta
- Order: Lepidoptera
- Family: Nymphalidae
- Genus: Lethe
- Species: L. kansa

Binomial name
- Lethe kansa (Moore, 1857)

= Lethe kansa =

Bamboo forester

Species of butterfly

Lethe kansa, the bamboo forester, is a species of Satyrinae butterfly found in the Indomalayan realm

== Subspecies ==
- L. k. kansa Sikkim, Kumaon to Assam, Burma
- L. k. zeugitana Fruhstorfer, 1911 Assam, Manipur
- L. k. vaga Fruhstorfer, 1911 Burma, Thailand, Yunnan
