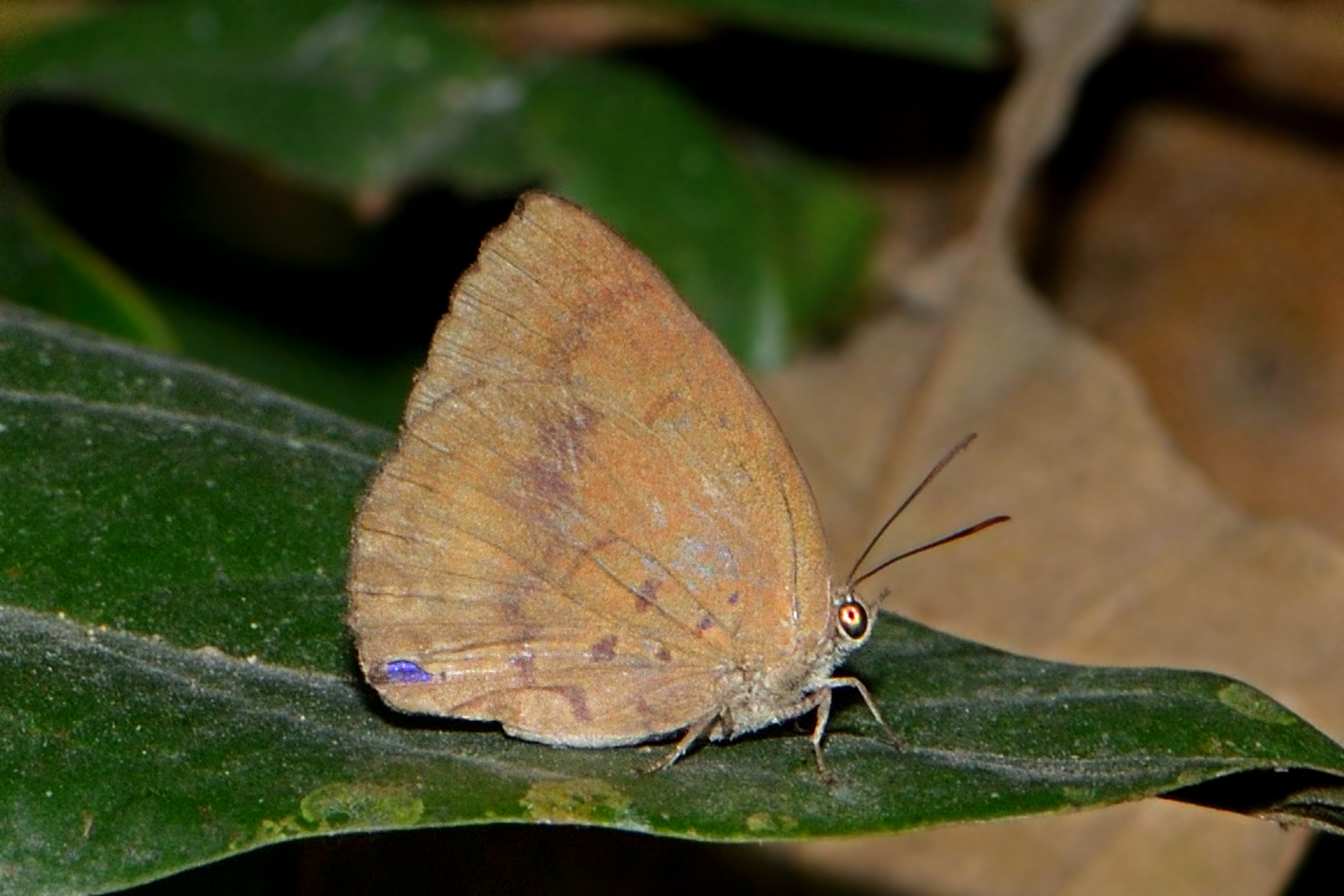
- Arhopala fulla

Scientific classification
- Kingdom: Animalia
- Phylum: Arthropoda
- Clade: Pancrustacea
- Class: Insecta
- Order: Lepidoptera
- Family: Lycaenidae
- Genus: Arhopala
- Species: A. fulla

Binomial name
- Arhopala fulla (Hewitson, 1862)

Synonyms
- Amblypodia fulla Hewitson, 1862; Amblypodia canulia Hewitson, 1869; Arhopala canulia sosias Fruhstorfer, 1914; Arhopala ignara Riley & Godfrey, 1921; Narathura fulla var. andamanica Wood-Mason & de Nicéville, 1881; Narathura subfasciata Moore, 1881; Arhopala intaca Corbet, 1941; Narathura fulla santa Evans, 1957

= Arhopala fulla =

Species of butterfly

Arhopala fulla , the spotless oakblue, is a species of butterfly belonging to the lycaenid family described by William Chapman Hewitson in 1862. It is found in Southeast Asia (Sikkim to Indonesia and the Philippines)

== Description ==
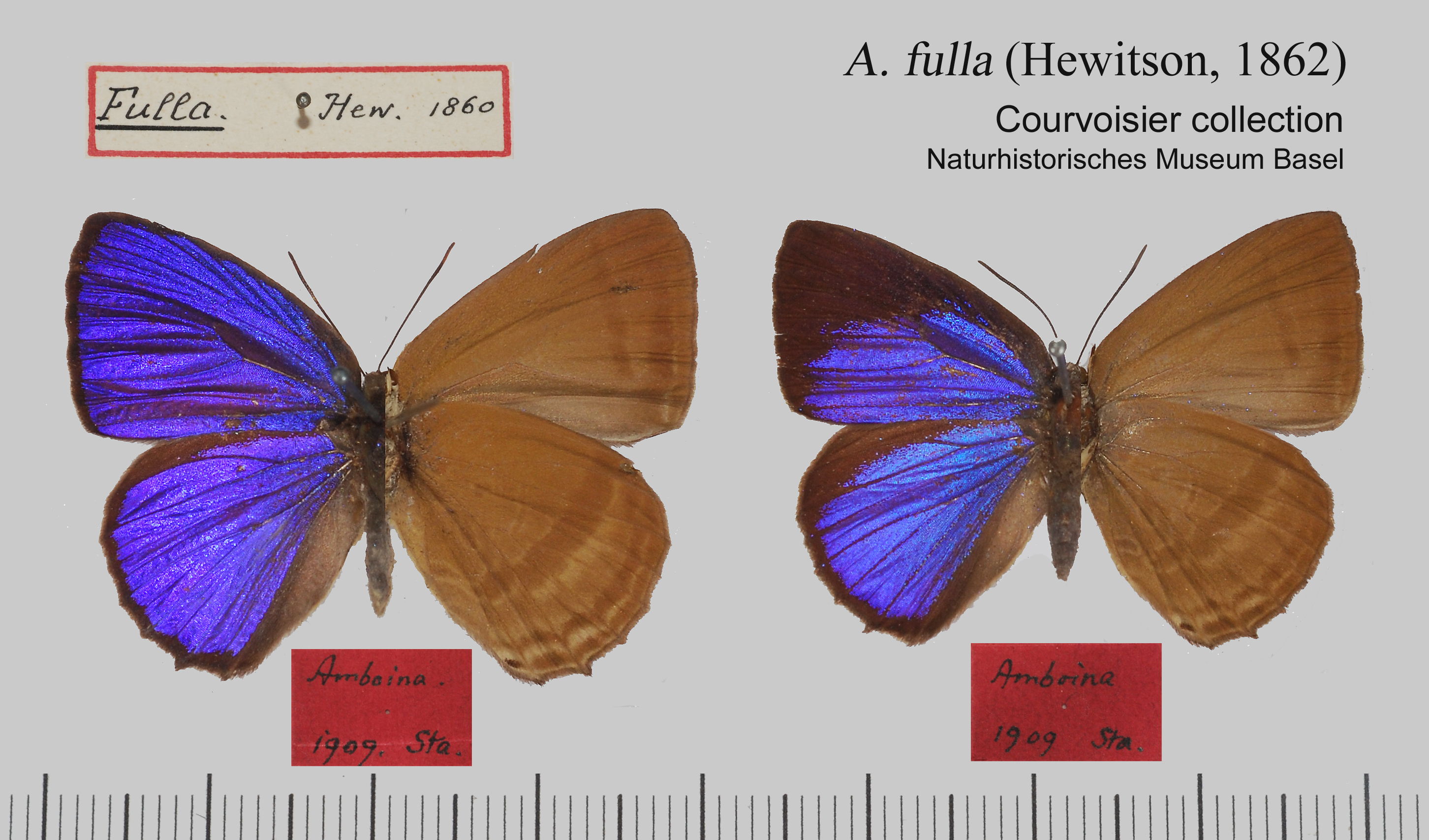

It is above very similar to canulia [now considered conspecific (described "is at once recognizable by the under surface showing no other markings but straight, slight transverse stripes in the marginal area and in the hindwing 2 discal transverse spots. Above the male is glossy lilac, the female has blackish, proximally blue forewings and violettish-blue hindwings with a very broad black margin. Philippines and Batjan. — The form sosias Fruhst. from the Molucca-Island of Obi is beneath whitish-grey instead of brownish-grey, and in the hindwing it has more distinct white -marginal dots)], but on the brown under surface the forewings is without any markings except 2 darker nebulous stripes parallel to the margin in the marginal area; also on the hindwing the discal transverse spots have disappeared except, a nebulous trace. In andamanica W.-Mas. (147 f) which is somewhat smaller and in the anal portion of the forewing much lighter, but in the marginal area of the hindwing much less brightened, the nebulous stripes beneath are still more indistinct, and the insect itself is said to be smaller. subfasciata Mr. resembles beneath again more typical fulla, but the stripes in the disc of the hindwing are absent, and the marginal dots are confined to few aint traces. — babbsi J. & T. (146 B a), from the Shouten Is., does not show any such traces at all; the marginal and basal areas beneath are almost of the same colour, separated by a broad dark shadow. - prasiae Fruhst., from Amboina, has a more intense lilac-blue upper surface than in the Andaman forms and those from uru, from where the species was originally described, separated from typical fulla by a more greyish than smoky-brown colouring beneath; the broad postdiscal band of the hindwing is bordered with yellowish instead of whitish.

== Subspecies ==
- Arhopala fulla fulla (Buru, Ambon)
- Arhopala fulla babsi Joicey & Talbot, 1917 (Waigeu, Misool, Papua, Tagula)
- Arhopala fulla canulia (Hewitson, 1869) (Obi, Halmahera, Ternate)
- Arhopala fulla prasia Fruhstorfer, 1914 (Amboina)
- Arhopala fulla ignara Riley & Godfrey, 1921 (Burma, Mergui, southern Thailand)
- Arhopala fulla andamanica (Wood-Mason & de Nicéville, 1881) (Andamans)
- Arhopala fulla intaca Corbet, 1941 (southern Thailand, Peninsular Malaysia, Sumatra, Borneo)
- Arhopala fulla santa (Evans, 1957) (Philippines: Luzon)
