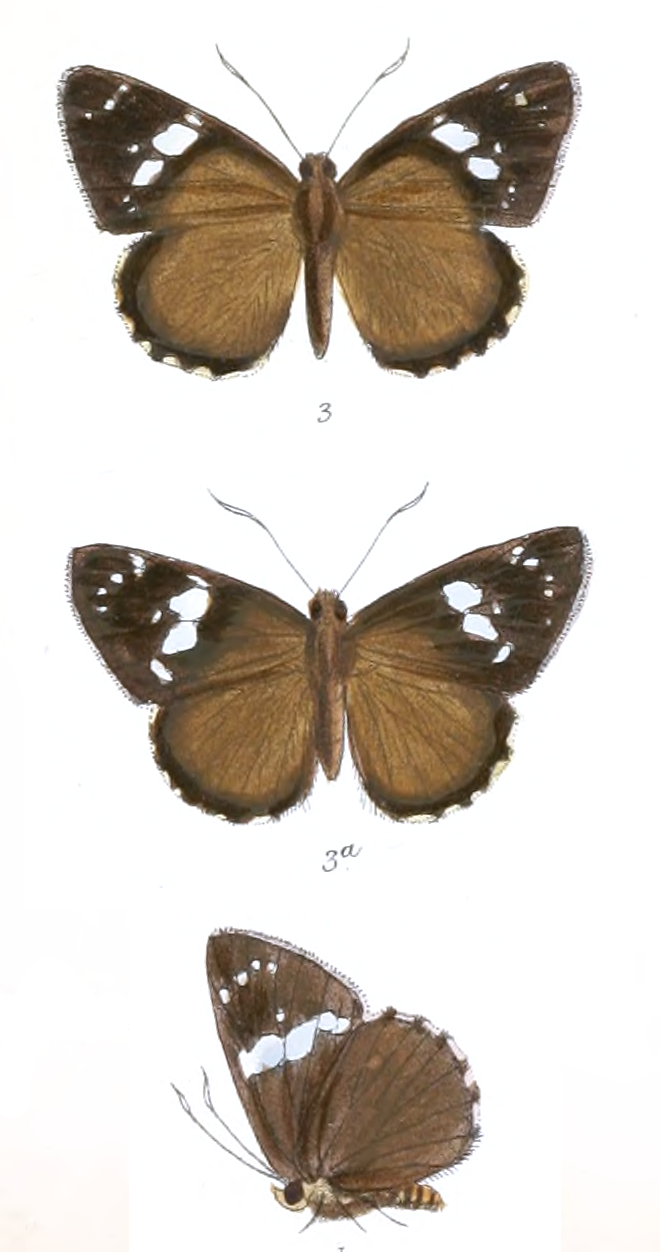

Scientific classification
- Kingdom: Animalia
- Phylum: Arthropoda
- Clade: Pancrustacea
- Class: Insecta
- Order: Lepidoptera
- Family: Hesperiidae
- Subfamily: Chamundinae
- Genus: Chamunda; Evans, 1949
- Species: C. chamunda

Binomial name
- Chamunda chamunda (Moore, [1866])

Synonyms
- Plesioneura chamunda Moore, [1866]; Celaenorrhinus chamunda

= Chamunda chamunda =

Species of butterfly

Chamunda chamunda is a species of spread-winged skipper in the family Hesperiidae. It is the only species in the monotypic genus Chamunda and the monotypic subfamily Chamundinae. It is found from Assam to Burma, Thailand, Laos, Peninsular Malaysia and possibly Java.
