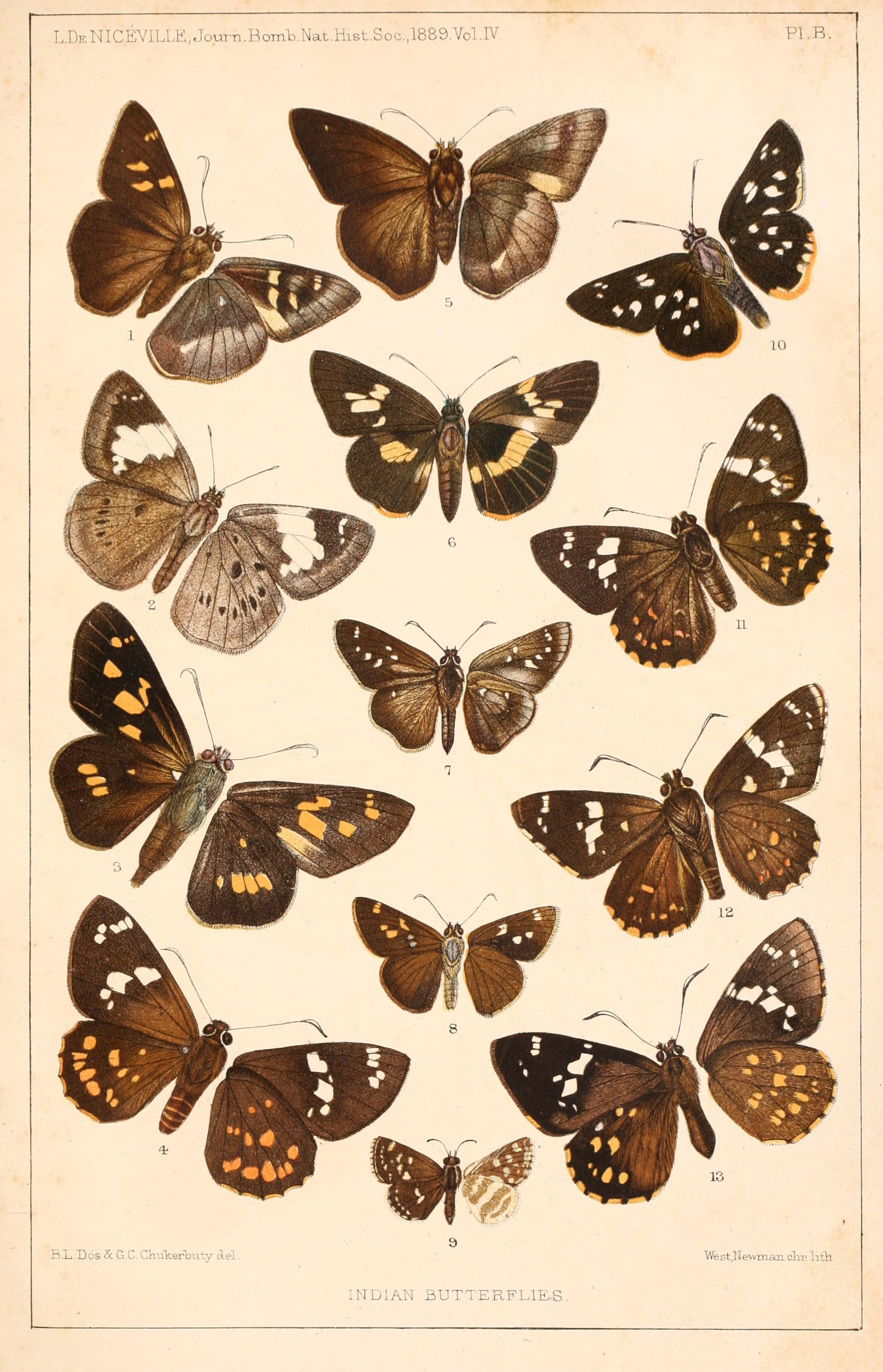
- Creteus cyrina as Parnara parca deniceville fig.

Scientific classification
- Kingdom: Animalia
- Phylum: Arthropoda
- Class: Insecta
- Order: Lepidoptera
- Family: Hesperiidae
- Genus: Creteus de Nicéville, 1895
- Species: C. cyrina

Binomial name
- Creteus cyrina (Hewitson, 1876)

Synonyms
- (Genus): Cyrina Hemming, 1939; (Species): Hesperia cyrina Hewitson, 1876; Cyrina cyrina

= Creteus =

Genus of butterflies

Creteus is a genus of skippers in the family Hesperiidae. It contains only one species, Creteus cyrina, which is found in Asia, including India, Thailand and Brunei.It is only separable from related genera by the male stigma which consists of a scent-scale stripe along the middle third of vein 2. The single species. C. cyrina Hew. resembles’’Eetion elia’’, but is easily discernible by the position of the hyaline spots of the hindwing: one in the cell-end, two above it and two below it. In Borneo-specimens the spots seem to be generally smaller. Khasia Hills and from the Kina-Balu (Borneo).
