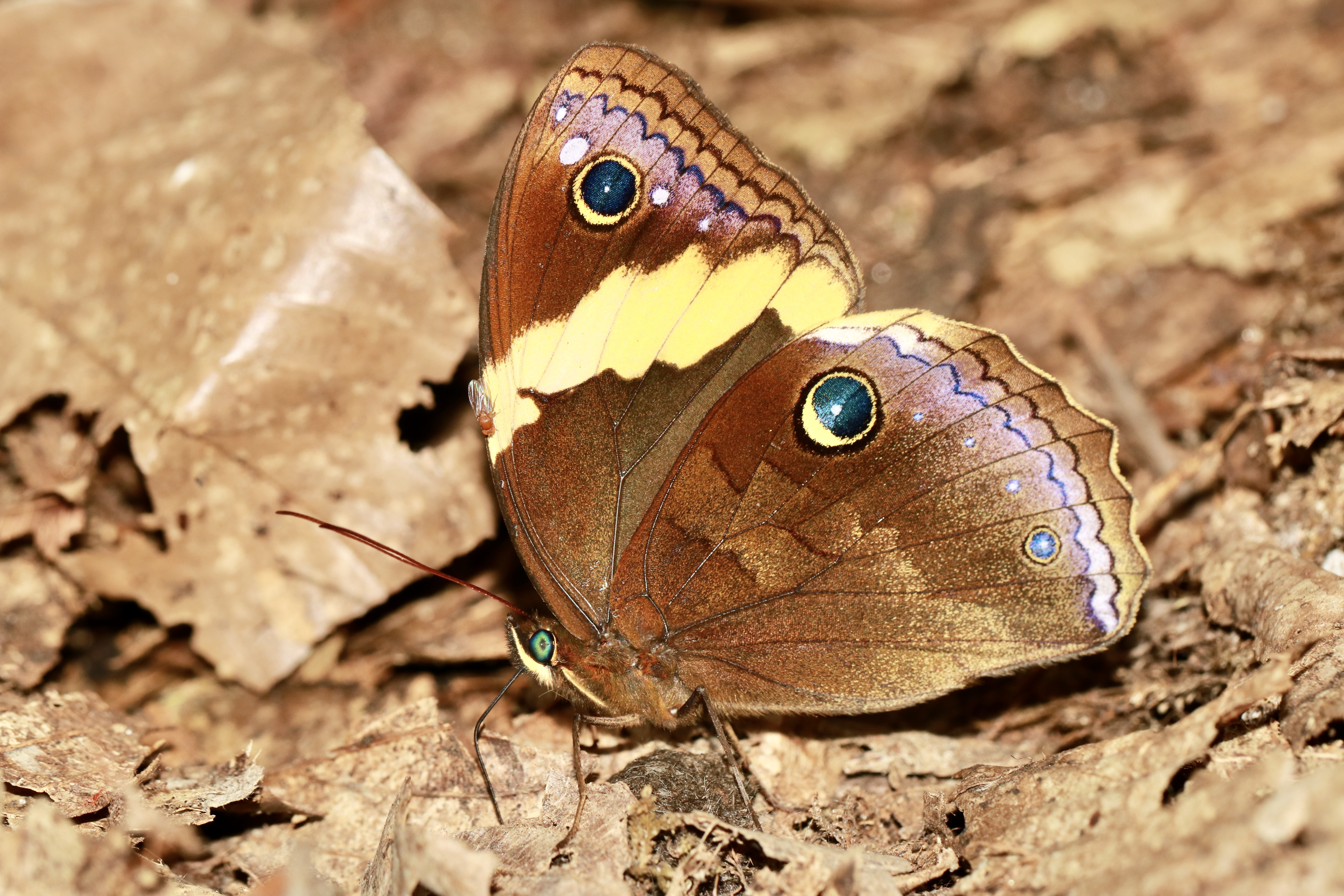
- Underside
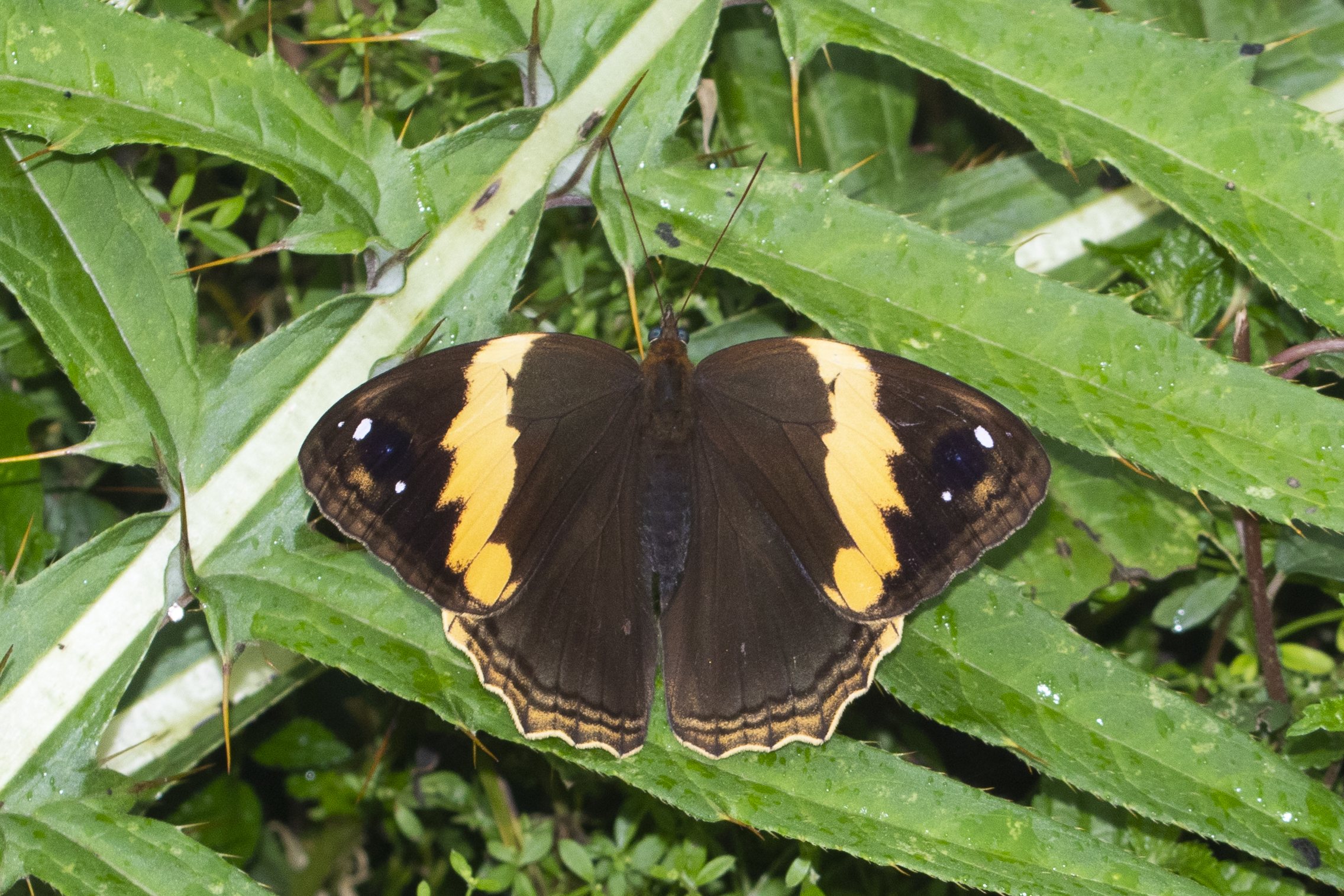
- Upperside

Scientific classification
- Kingdom: Animalia
- Phylum: Arthropoda
- Clade: Pancrustacea
- Class: Insecta
- Order: Lepidoptera
- Family: Nymphalidae
- Genus: Neorina
- Species: N. hilda

Binomial name
- Neorina hilda Westwood, 1850

= Neorina hilda =

Species of butterfly

Neorina hilda, also known as the yellow owl, is a butterfly in the family Nymphalidae. It is found from Sikkim in India to Yunnan. It was described by John Obadiah Westwood in 1850. This species is monotypic.

== Description ==
The forewings are large and subtriangular. The inner margin is nearly straight, and it is longer than the apical margin. The hindwings are almost semicircular, with the veins being arranged like in Orinoma damaris. The forelegs are small, while the hindlegs are long with few hairs.
