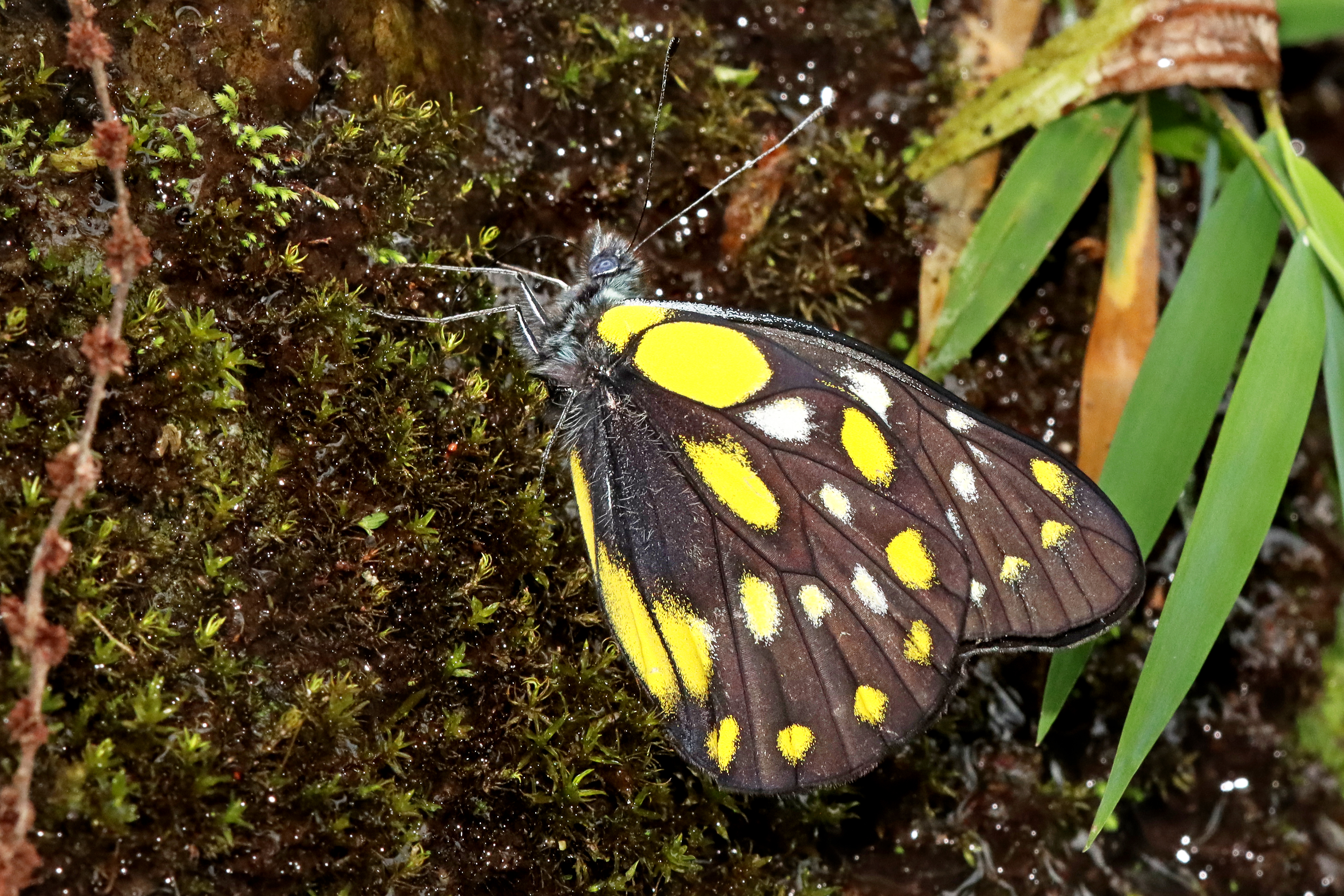

Scientific classification
- Kingdom: Animalia
- Phylum: Arthropoda
- Class: Insecta
- Order: Lepidoptera
- Family: Pieridae
- Genus: Delias
- Species: D. sanaca

Binomial name
- Delias sanaca (Moore, 1857)

= Delias sanaca =

Pale Jezebel

Species of butterfly

Delias sanaca, the pale Jezebel, is a medium-sized butterfly of the family Pieridae. The species was first described by Frederic Moore in 1857.

== See also ==
- List of butterflies of India
- List of butterflies of India (Pieridae)
