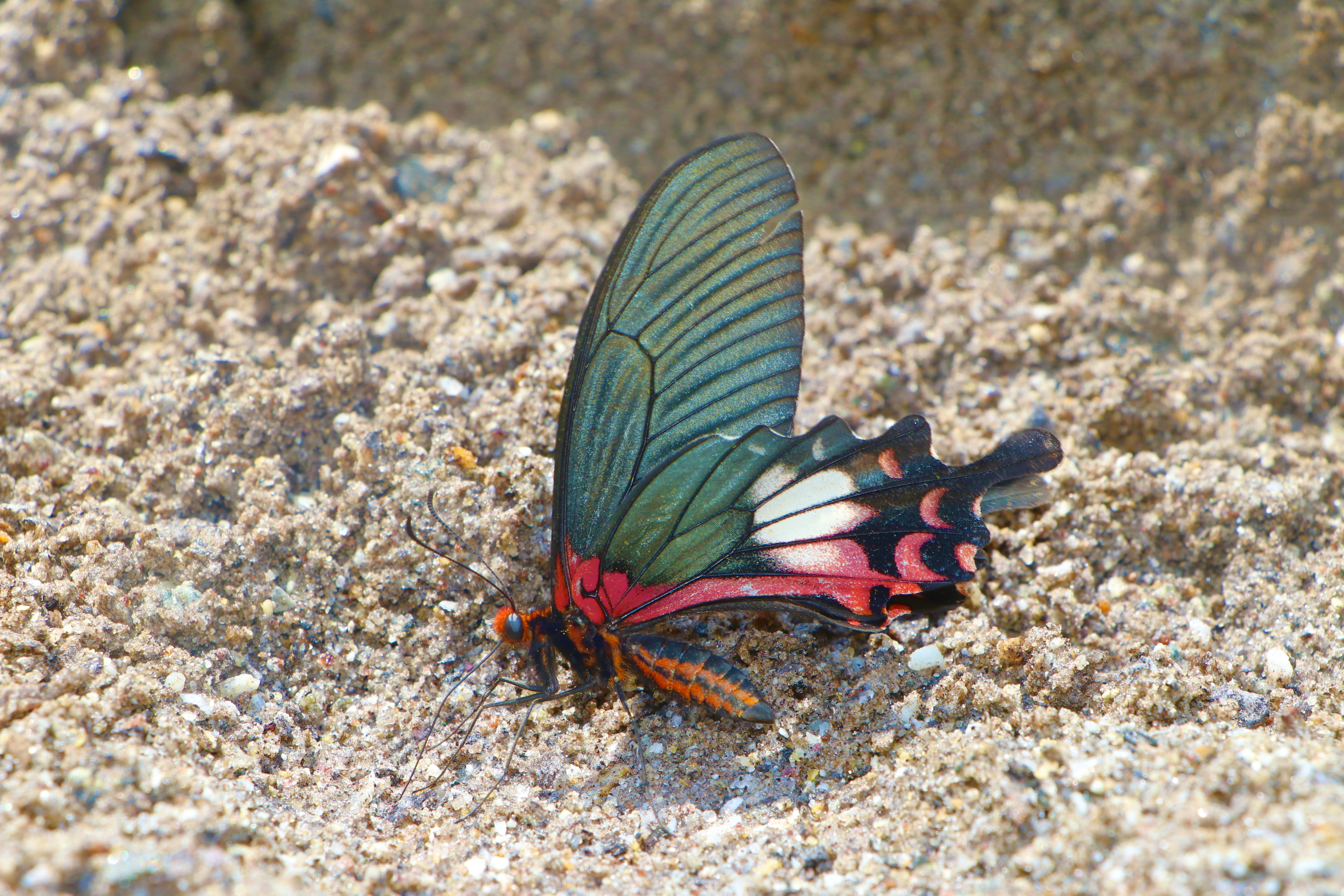

Scientific classification
- Kingdom: Animalia
- Phylum: Arthropoda
- Class: Insecta
- Order: Lepidoptera
- Family: Papilionidae
- Genus: Papilio
- Species: P. bootes

Binomial name
- Papilio bootes Westwood, 1842

= Papilio bootes =

Tailed redbreast

Species of butterfly

Papilio bootes, the tailed redbreast, is a swallowtail butterfly found in Asia. Within their wide distribution about four population variants have been named as subspecies. They have been placed within the Menelaides clade by a 2015 phylogenetics study.

== Description ==
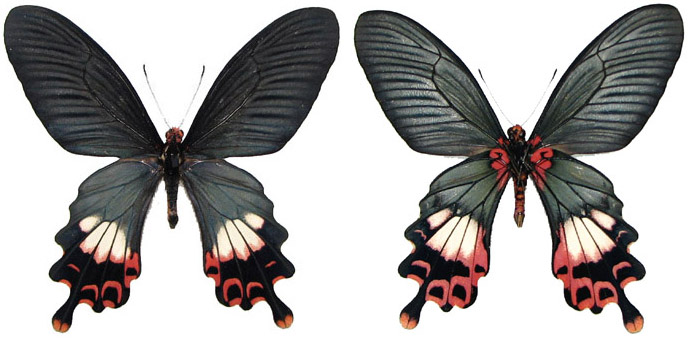
P. b. mindoni, Chudu Razi Hills, north-east Burma

Male upperside velvety black. Forewing with pale internervular streaks that do not reach the terminal margin and only obscurely extend into the cell. Hindwing with similar streaks in interspaces 5 and 6, but the ground colour of the cell and of the lower and posterior portions of the wing uniform; interspaces 3 and 4 with elongate somewhat oval white spots at base, an admarginal red spot at tornus and at apex of interspace 2, and similar white spots intermixed with a few reddish scales as follows: one at apex of interspace 3, two near apex of tail, one on each side of vein 4, and a fourth at apex of interspace 4; the cilia black, touched with white in the middle of the interspaces; over the red tornal spot is a minute red crescent mark. Underside similar; the pale adnervular streaks on the forewing are more prominent and extend well into the cell; two or three red spots at extreme base of costa. Hindwing: ground colour as on the upperside, but in interspaces 6 and 7 silky black with a slight greenish lustre: markings as on the upperside, but the base of the wing dark red crossed by the black veins, the tornal red spot with a much broader lunular mark above it, and similar lunules above the admarginal spots in interspaces 2 and 3, that in 3 sometimes confluent with the admarginal spot. Antennae, thorax posteriorly and abdomen black; head and thorax in front red; beneath: the palpi, thorax and abdomen red, the latter two with black markings.

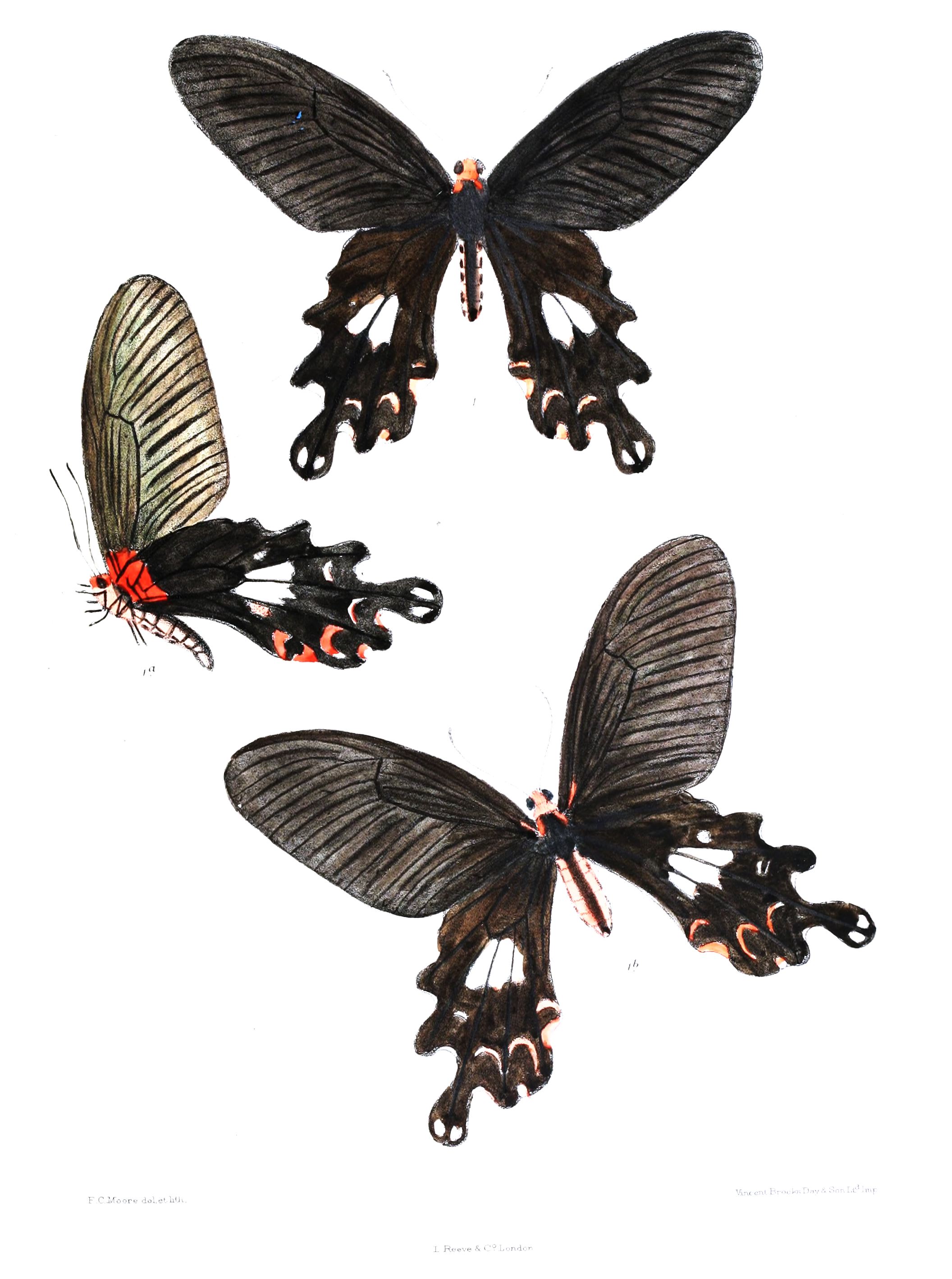
P. bootes bootes

Female. Similar. Upperside: ground colour brownish black; forewing with the internervular pale streaks broader and more prominent, a small spot of red at base of wing; hindwing with an additional oval while spot in the interspace below the white spots in interspaces 3 and 4, and postdiscal lunular markings in interspaces 1 to 4. Of these the lunules in 1 and 2 are red, in 3 white irrorated with a few red scales, and in 4 pure white. Underside similar to that in the male, the red at base of wings more extended, the white discal spot in interspace 2 very small, irrorated with red scales; the postdiscal, lunular and admarginal spots larger, with a white postdiscal lunule in interspace 4. Antennae, head, thorax and abdomen similar to those of the male but the red of a paler tint.

== Subspecies ==
- Papilio bootes mindoni (north-eastern Burma)
- Papilio bootes janaka (northern Burma)
- Papilio bootes xamnuensis (north-eastern Laos)
- Papilio bootes ssp. (northern Vietnam)

== Status ==
This butterfly is not common but is not regarded as threatened. It is protected by law in India.

== See also ==
- Papilionidae
- List of butterflies of India
- List of butterflies of India (Papilionidae)
