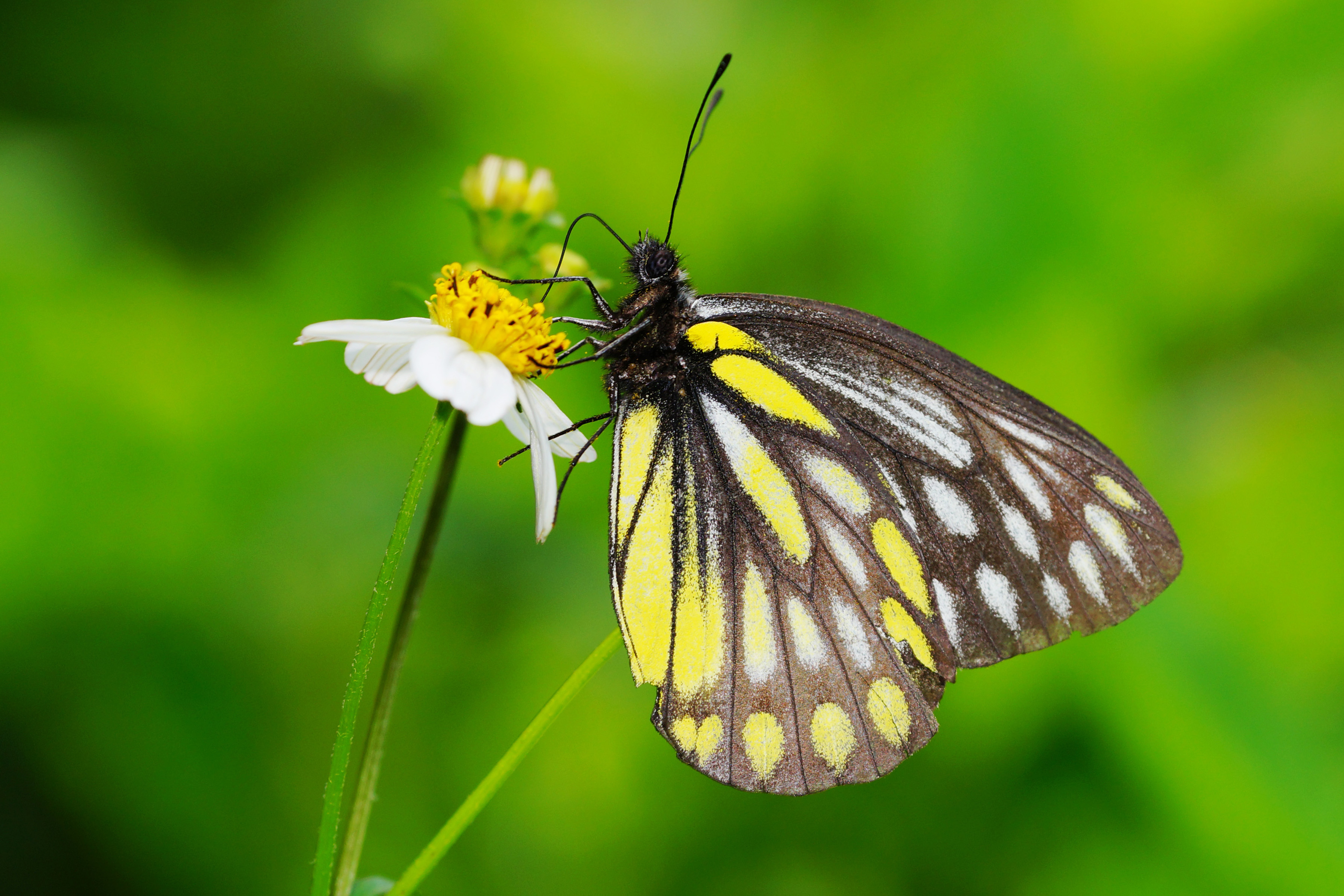

Scientific classification
- Domain: Eukaryota
- Kingdom: Animalia
- Phylum: Arthropoda
- Class: Insecta
- Order: Lepidoptera
- Family: Pieridae
- Genus: Delias
- Species: D. lativitta

Binomial name
- Delias lativitta Leech, 1893

Synonyms
- Delias shaanxiensis Chou, Zang, Wang, 2001; Delias patrua var. formosana Matsumura, 1909; Delias lativitta f. naga Tytler, 1939

= Delias lativitta =

Species of butterfly

Delias lativitta is a butterfly in the family Pieridae. It was described by John Henry Leech in 1893 . It is found in the east Palearctic and (just) in the Indomalayan realm.

The wingspan is about 83–100 mm for males and 102–104 mm for females. Adults may be distinguished by the white cell patch on the upperside of the hindwings.

== Subspecies ==
- D. l. lativitta (Kanding, W. Sichuan, China)
- D. l. formosana Matsumura, 1909 (China, Taiwan)
- D. l. parva Talbot, 1937 (Bhutan, Burma, Shan States)
- D. l. naga Tytler, 1939 (Nagaland, N.E. India)
- D. l. yunnana Talbot, 1937 (Weixi, N.Yunnan, China)
- D. l. yuani Huang, 2000 (Metok, SE Tibet)
- D. l. tongi Mell, 1938 (Kuatun, north-western Fujian, China)
- D. l. batangensis Yoshino, 2022 (Batang, Far W. Sichuan, China)
- D. l. shaanxiensis Chou, Zhang & Wang 2001 (Shaanxi, China)
- D. l. nepalica Katayama, 2017 (Nepal)
