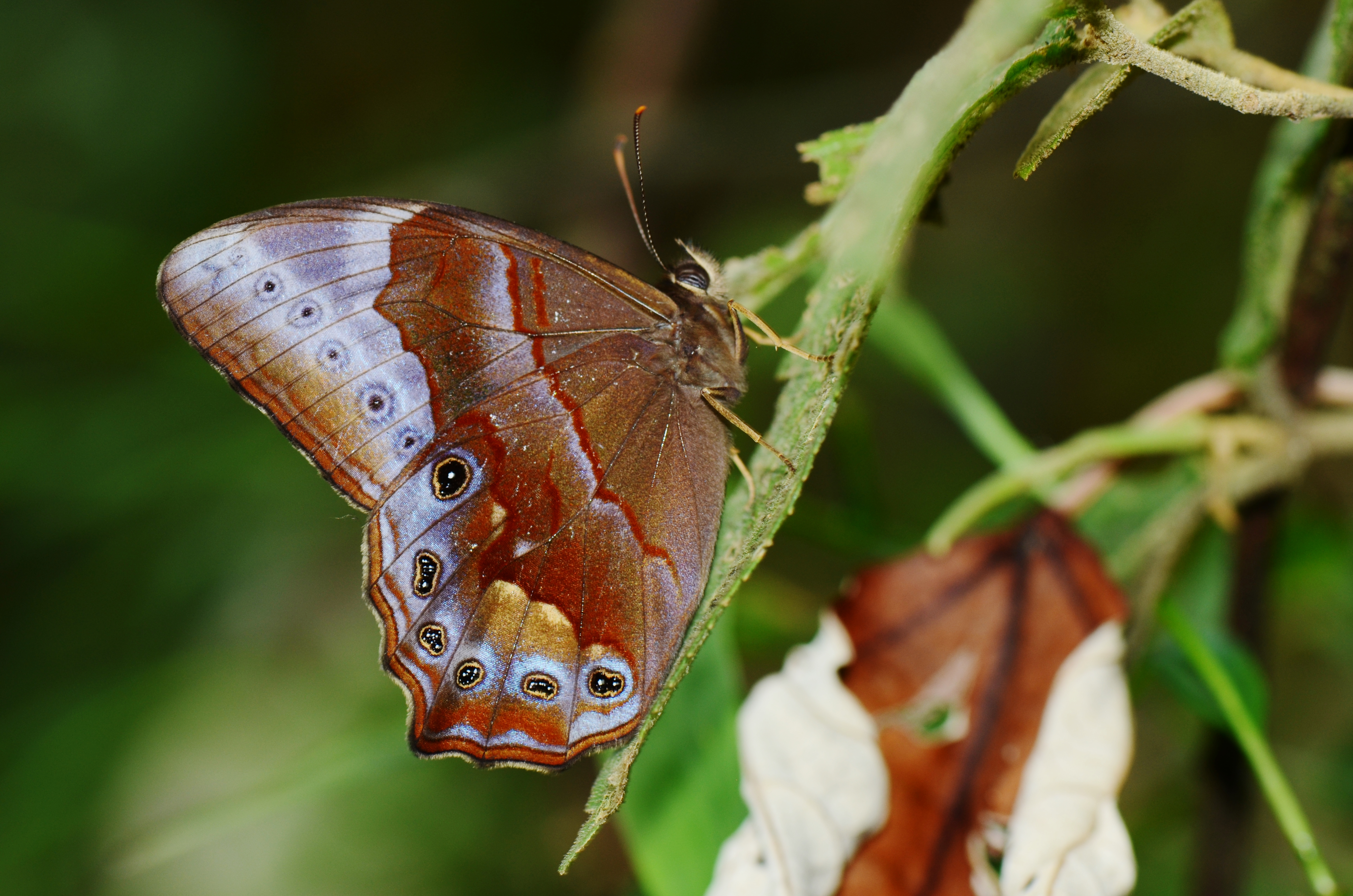

Scientific classification
- Kingdom: Animalia
- Phylum: Arthropoda
- Clade: Pancrustacea
- Class: Insecta
- Order: Lepidoptera
- Family: Nymphalidae
- Genus: Lethe
- Species: L. chandica

Binomial name
- Lethe chandica (Moore, [1858])

= Lethe chandica =

Angled red forester

Species of butterfly

Lethe chandica, the angled red forester, is a species of Satyrinae butterfly found in the Indomalayan realm.

== Subspecies ==
In Seitz

- L. c. chandica Northwest India to Peninsular Malaya, Sumatra and Yunnan
- L. c. namura Fruhstorfer, 1911 Peninsular Malaya, Sumatra
- L. c. marga Fruhstorfer, 1911 Java
- L. c. ratnacri Fruhstorfer, 1908 Taiwan
- L. c. coelestis Leech, [1892] West China
- L. c. flanona Fruhstorfer, 1911 Assam
- L. c. suvarna Fruhstorfer, 1908 Laos, North Vietnam, Hainan
- L. c. negrito (C. & R. Felder, 1863) Philippines (Luzon)
- L. c. sisapon Fruhstorfer, 1911 Philippines (Mindoro)
- L. c. byzaccus Fruhstorfer, 1911 Philippines (Mindanao)
- L. c. jomaria Fruhstorfer, 1911 Sulu Islands
- L. c. ratnapandi Fruhstorfer, 1911 Palawan
