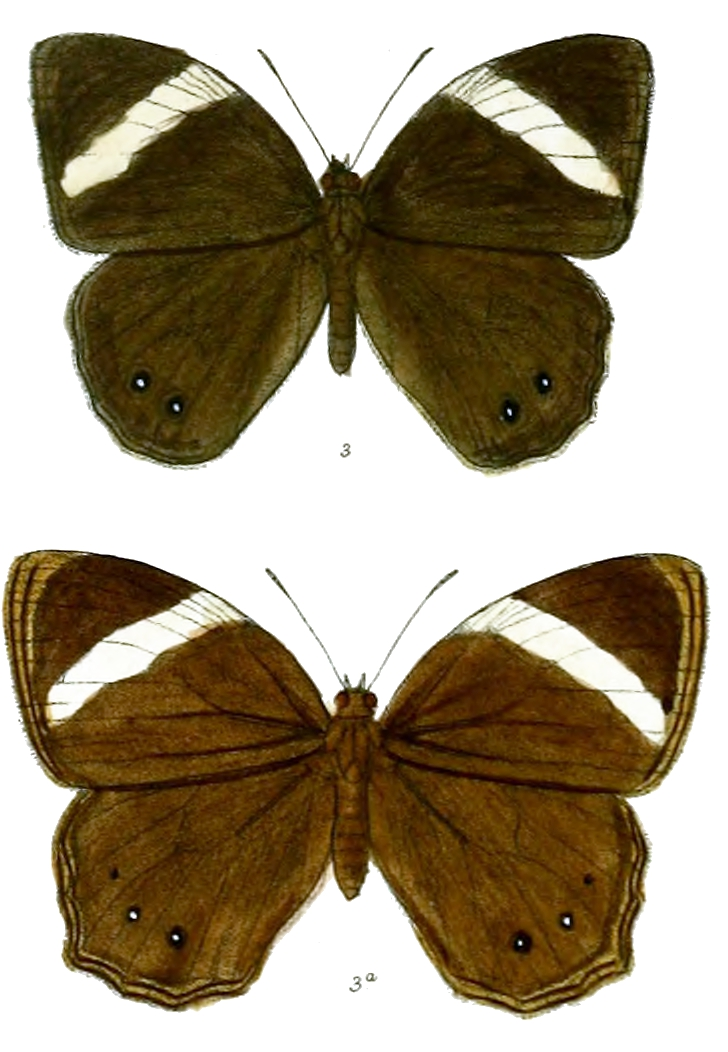
- Lethe verma in Lepidoptera Indica

Scientific classification
- Domain: Eukaryota
- Kingdom: Animalia
- Phylum: Arthropoda
- Class: Insecta
- Order: Lepidoptera
- Family: Nymphalidae
- Genus: Lethe
- Species: L. verma

Binomial name
- Lethe verma (Kollar, 1844)

= Lethe verma =

Straight-banded treebrown

Species of butterfly

Lethe verma , the straight-banded treebrown, is a species of Satyrinae butterfly found in the Indomalayan realm

== Subspecies ==
- L. v. verma Northwest India, Kashmir, Assam
- L. v. sintica Fruhstorfer, 1911 Sikkim, Assam, Yunnan
- L. v. stenopa Fruhstorfer, 1908 Burma, Thailand - Indo China, South China, Hainan
- L. v. robinsoni Pendlebury, 1933 Peninsular Malaya (Cameron Highlands)
- L. v. satarnus Fruhstorfer, 1911 West China
- L. v. cintamani Fruhstorfer, 1909 Taiwan
