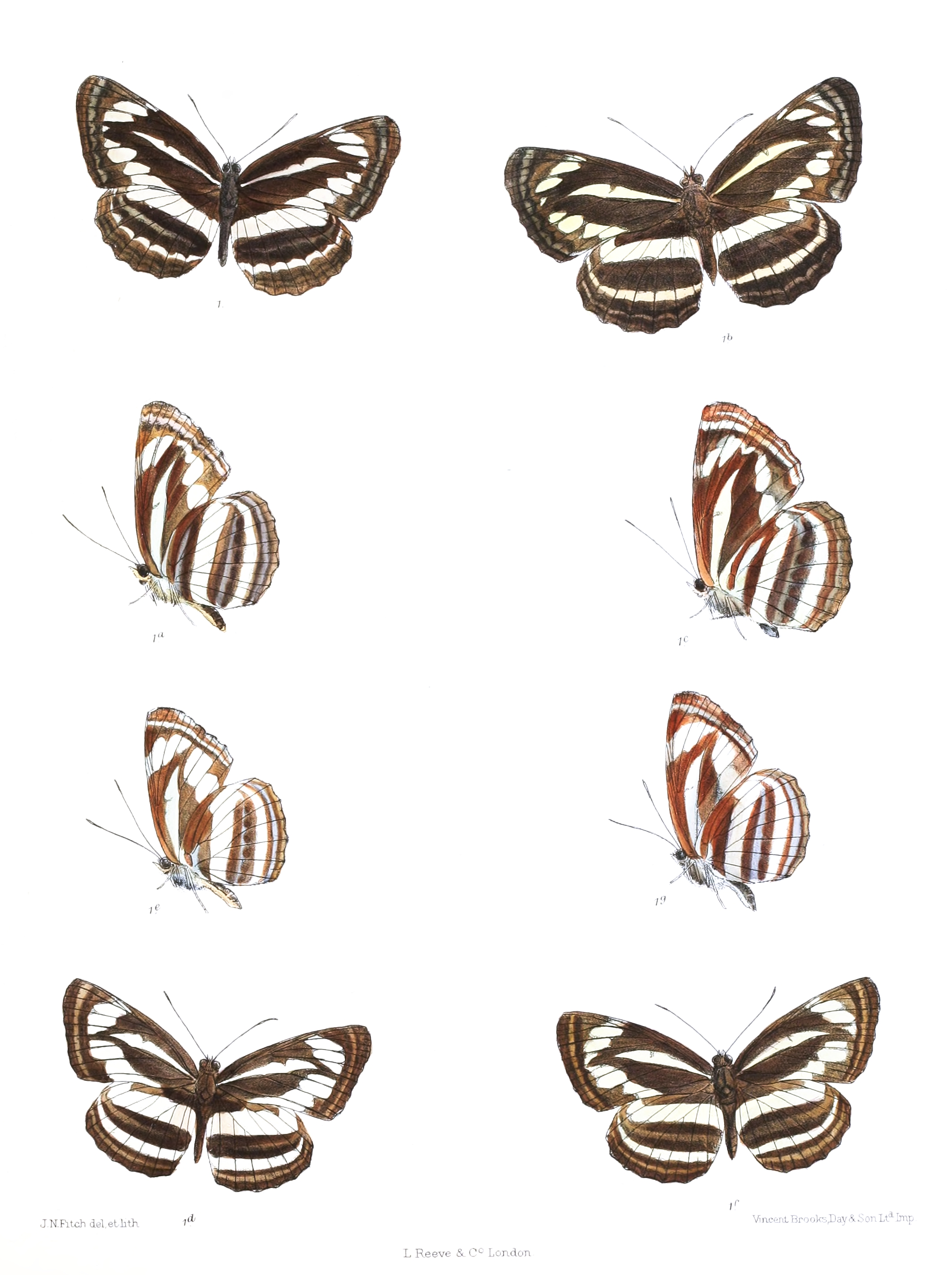

Scientific classification
- Domain: Eukaryota
- Kingdom: Animalia
- Phylum: Arthropoda
- Class: Insecta
- Order: Lepidoptera
- Family: Nymphalidae
- Genus: Neptis
- Species: N. sankara

Binomial name
- Neptis sankara (Kollar, [1844])

Synonyms
- Limenitis sankara Kollar, [1844]; Neptis amba Moore, 1858; Neptis quilta Swinhoe, 1897; Limenitis antonia Oberthür, 1876

= Neptis sankara =

Species of butterfly

Neptis sankara, the broad-banded sailer, is a species of nymphalid butterfly found in the Indomalayan realm.

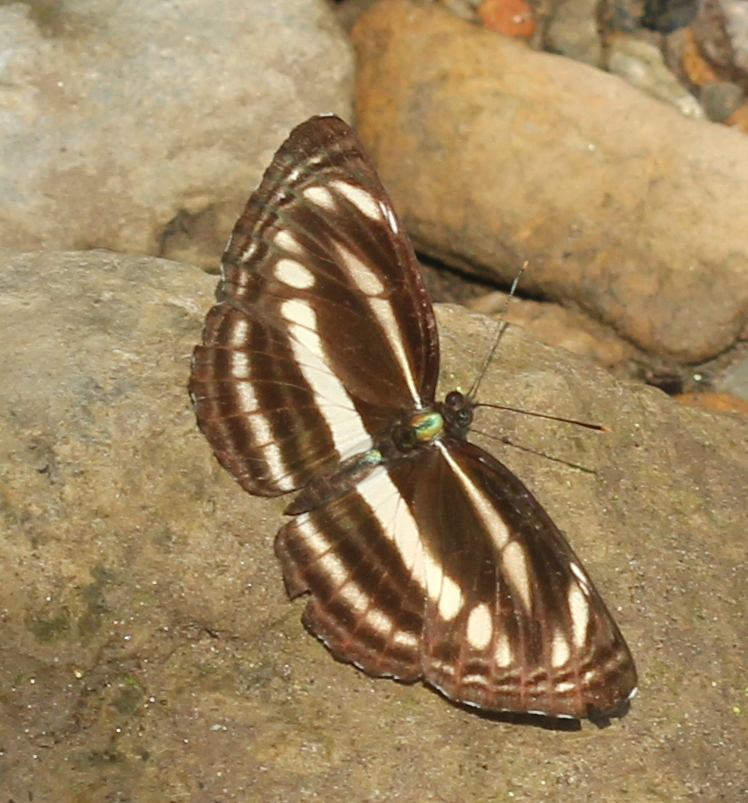
At the Garo Hills, Meghalaya, India

== Subspecies ==
- Neptis sankara sankara
- Neptis sankara amba Moore, 1858 (Assam, Nepal and possibly north-eastern Burma)
- Neptis sankara peninsularis Eliot, 1969 (Peninsular Malaya)
- Neptis sankara yamari Fruhstorfer, 1908 (Sumatra (Battak Mountains))
- Neptis sankara shirakiana Matsumura, 1929 (Taiwan)
- Neptis sankara antonia Oberthür, 1876 (western China)
- Neptis sankara guiltoides Tytler, 1940 (Burma, Thailand, Yunnan)
- Neptis sankara xishuanbannaensis Yoshino, 1997 (Yunnan)
