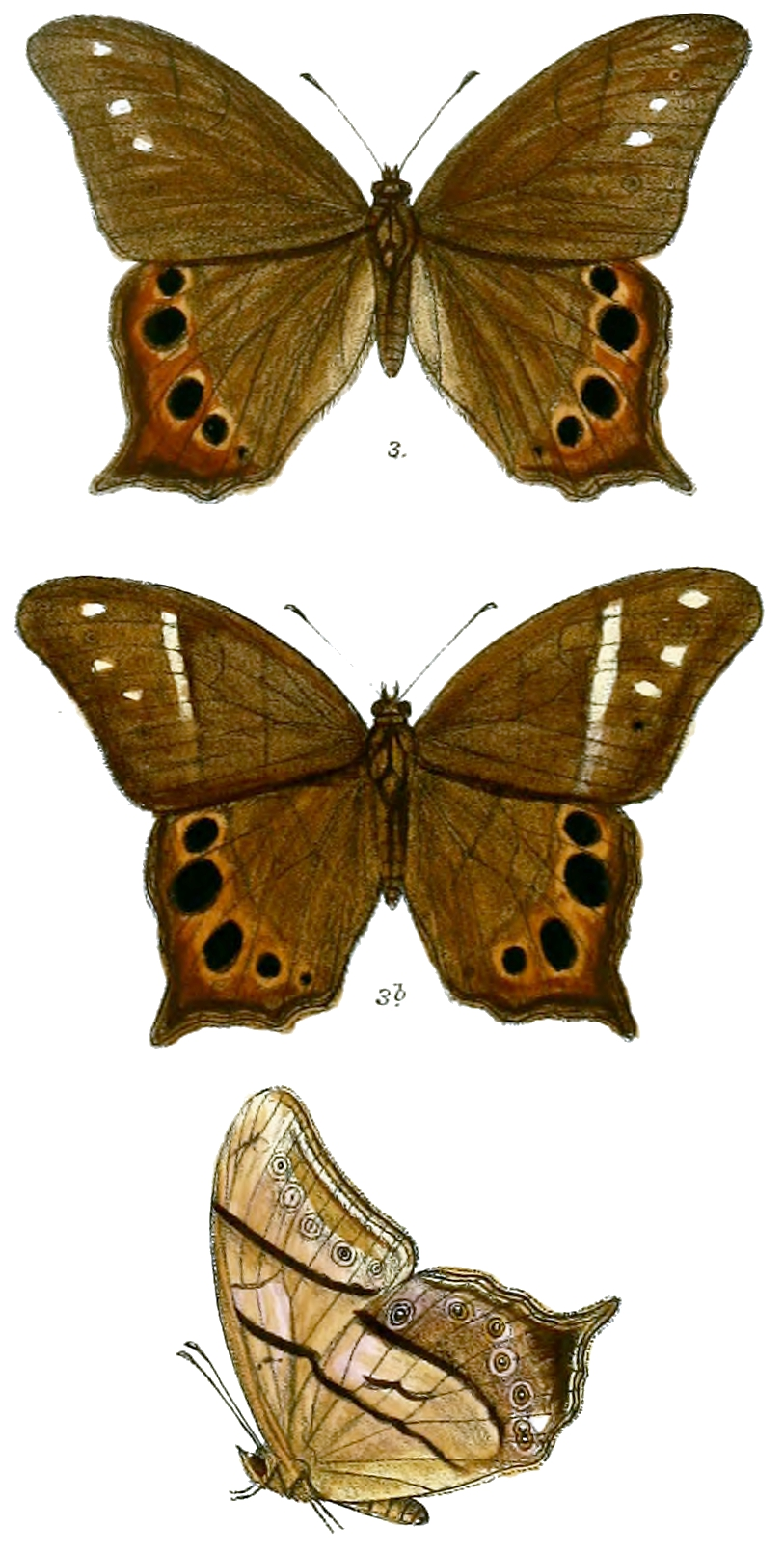
- Lethe sinorix in Lepidoptera Indica

Scientific classification
- Domain: Eukaryota
- Kingdom: Animalia
- Phylum: Arthropoda
- Class: Insecta
- Order: Lepidoptera
- Family: Nymphalidae
- Genus: Lethe
- Species: L. sinorix

Binomial name
- Lethe sinorix (Hewitson, 1863)

= Lethe sinorix =

Tailed red forester

Species of butterfly

Lethe sinorix, the tailed red forester, is a species of Satyrinae butterfly found in the Indomalayan realm

== Subspecies ==
- L. s. sinorix Sikkim, Bhutan, Assam, Burma, Thailand
- L. s. vanda Corbet, 1941 Peninsular Malaya (Cameron Highlands)
- L. s. obscura Mell, 1942
