= Arhopala curiosa =

Curious oakblue

Scientific classification
- Kingdom: Animalia
- Phylum: Arthropoda
- Class: Insecta
- Order: Lepidoptera
- Family: Lycaenidae
- Subfamily: Theclinae
- Tribe: Arhopalini
- Genus: Arhopala
- Species: A. curiosa

Binomial name
- Arhopala curiosa Evans, 1957

Synonyms
- Narathura curiosa

Species of butterfly

Arhopala curiosa, the curious oakblue, is a butterfly in the family Lycaenidae. It was described by William Harry Evans in 1957. It is found in western Bhutan and Eaglenest Wildlife Sanctuary. This species is monotypic.

== Description ==
The upperside is purple blue with a black border of 4 millimeters. The underside is reddish-brown, with a slight purplish tinge. It has a weird wing shape, close to that of Mahathala butterflies.
