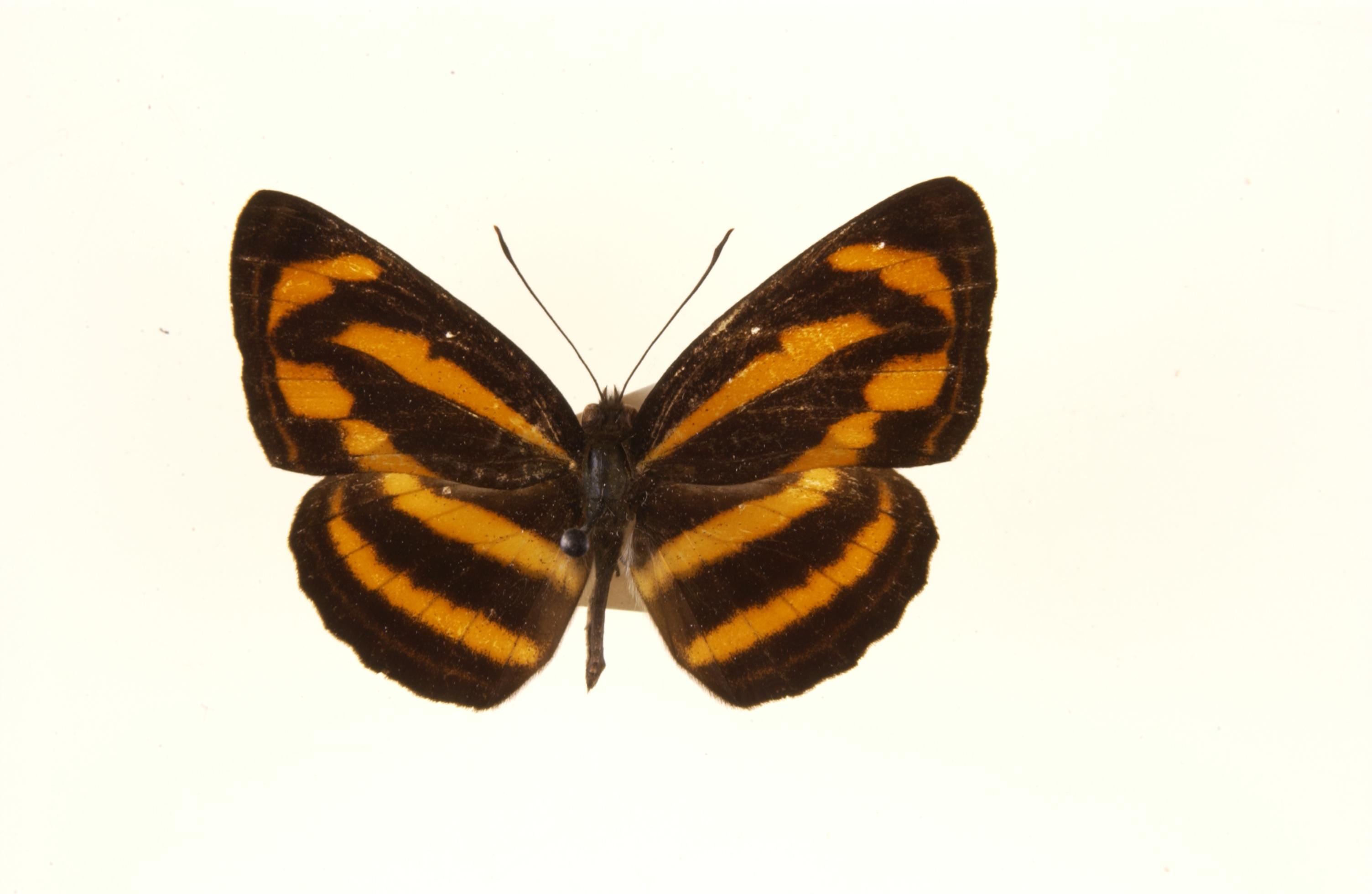
- Museum specimen

Scientific classification
- Kingdom: Animalia
- Phylum: Arthropoda
- Class: Insecta
- Order: Lepidoptera
- Family: Nymphalidae
- Genus: Neptis
- Species: N. miah

Binomial name
- Neptis miah Moore, 1858

= Neptis miah =

Small yellow sailer

Species of butterfly

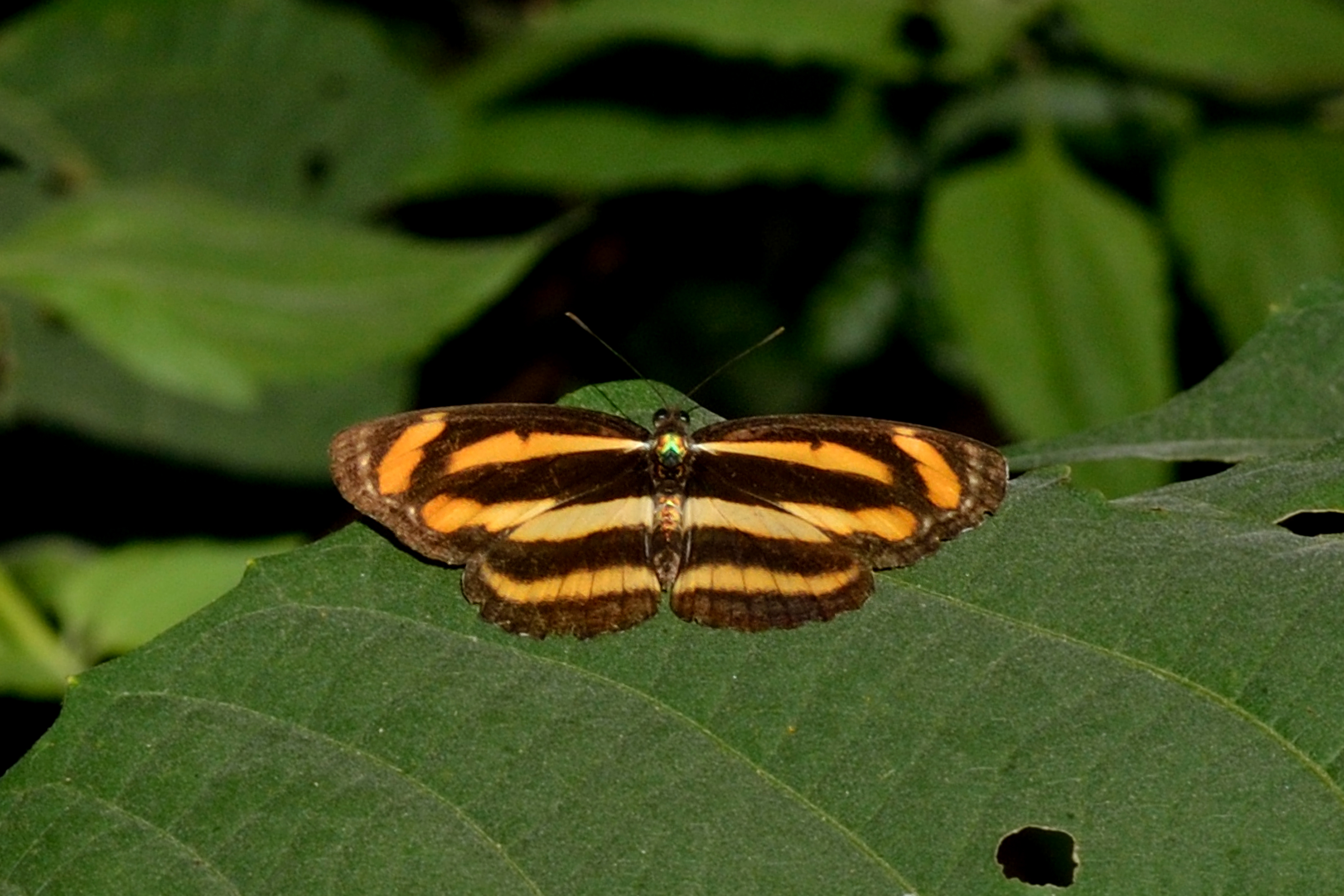
Neptis miah

Neptis miah, the small yellow sailer, is a nymphalid butterfly found in India, Bhutan, Thailand, Myanmar (Burma) and Malaysia eastward to western China, Hainan and Guangdong. Seven subspecies have been identified. The Guangdong subspecies belongs to N. miah disopa Swinhoe and the Hainan subspecies is considered as N. miah nolana Druce.

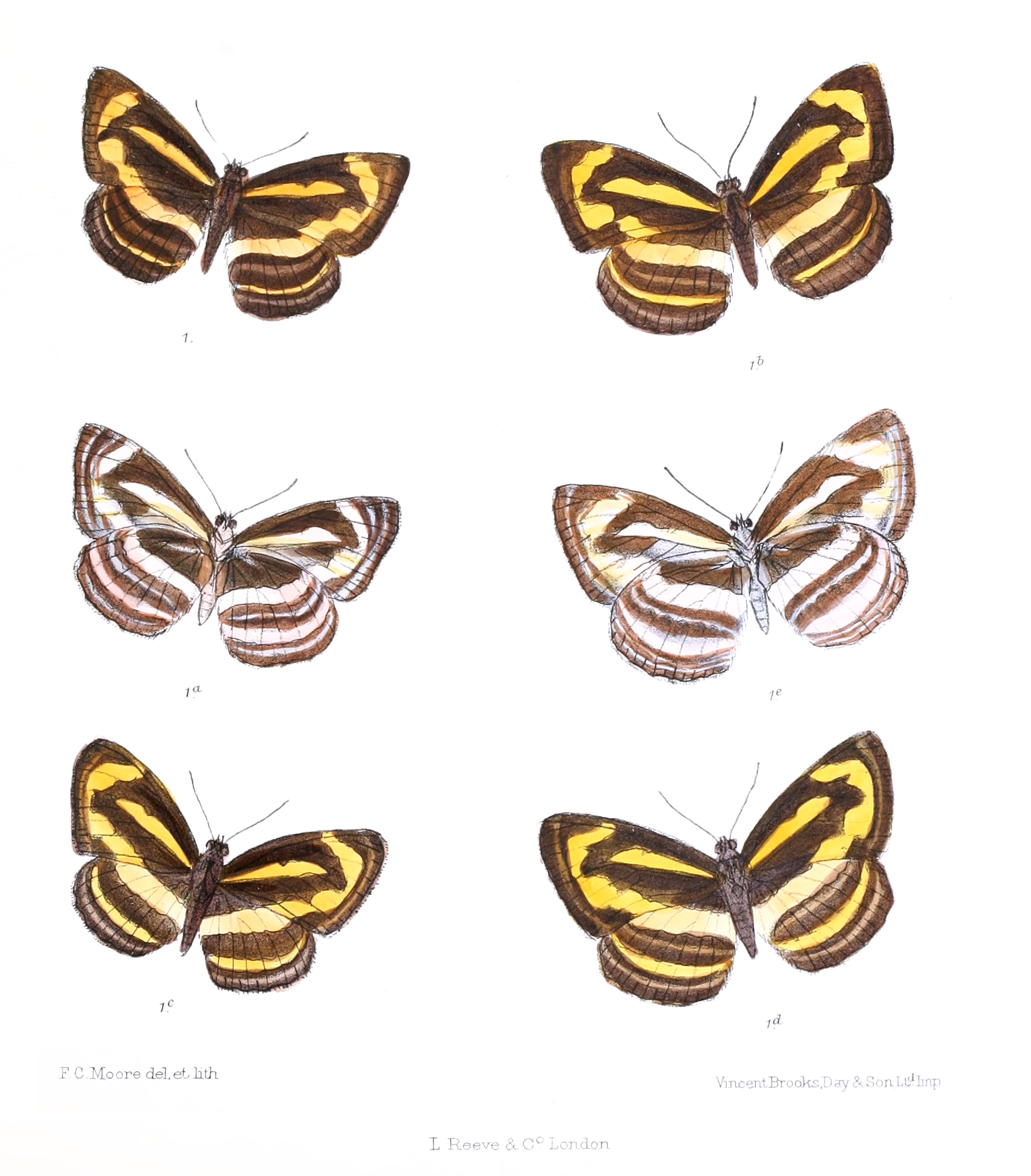
Neptis miah specimens

The whole Neptini tribe is a difficult group and many species are alike. In fact, there may be a few unrecorded species flying in Hong Kong, which may be mistaken as the common N. hordonia or other brownish Neptis, like N. clinia Moore.
