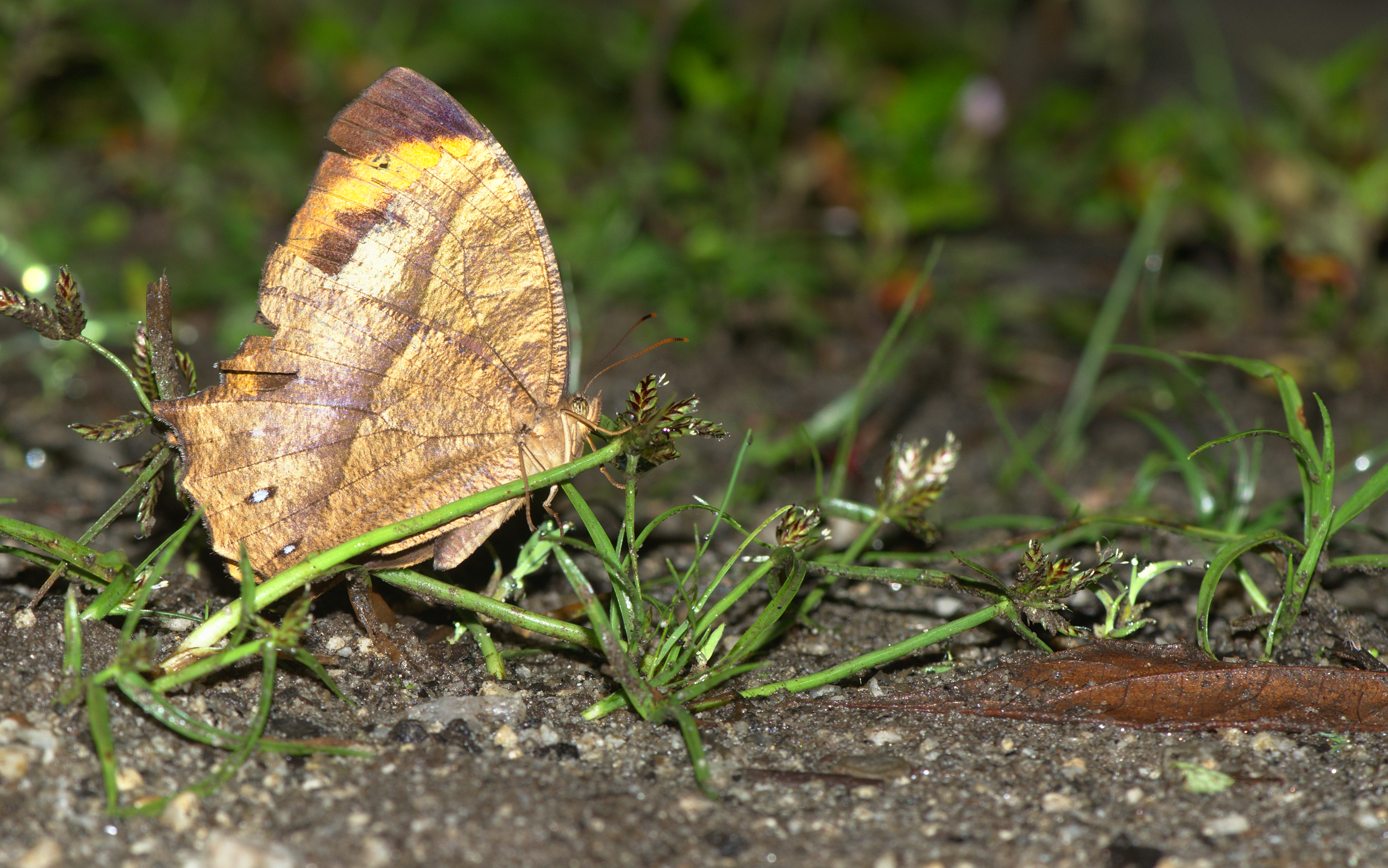
- From Arunachal Pradesh

Scientific classification
- Kingdom: Animalia
- Phylum: Arthropoda
- Class: Insecta
- Order: Lepidoptera
- Family: Nymphalidae
- Genus: Cyllogenes
- Species: C. janetae

Binomial name
- Cyllogenes janetae de Nicéville, 1887

= Cyllogenes janetae =

Species of butterfly

Cyllogenes janetae, the scarce evening brown is a brown (Satyrinae) butterfly that is found in the Himalayas. Subspecies Cyllogenes janetae orientalis Monastyrskii, 2005 is found in Vietnam.

== Range ==
The butterfly is found in the Himalayas in Sikkim, Bhutan, northern West Bengal, Assam, Manipur and Nagaland.

== Status ==
In 1932 William Harry Evans described it as very rare.

== Description ==
The scarce evening brown is 90 to 95 mm in wingspan and broadly resembles the Melanitis evening browns, with rich brown colour above. The upper forewing has a broad yellow apical band which reaches the termen. The male, unlike Cyllogenes suradeva does not have a brand on the upper forewing.
