= Evening brown =

Evening brown may refer to:

- Melanitis, a genus of tropical and subtropical satyr butterflies
- Melanitis leda, a species in that genus native to Africa, India, Indochina, Oceania, and the Pacific Islands
