= Dactylispa tenella =

Scientific classification
- Kingdom: Animalia
- Phylum: Arthropoda
- Class: Insecta
- Order: Coleoptera
- Suborder: Polyphaga
- Infraorder: Cucujiformia
- Family: Chrysomelidae
- Genus: Dactylispa
- Species: D. tenella

Binomial name
- Dactylispa tenella (Péringuey, 1898)

Synonyms
- Hispa tenella Péringuey, 1898; Dactylispa notha Weise, 1899

Species of beetle

Dactylispa tenella is a species of beetle of the family Chrysomelidae. It is found in Angola, Cameroon, Congo, Equatorial Guinea, Guinea, Kenya, Madagascar, Nigeria and South Africa.

== Life history ==
The recorded host plants for this species are Oplismenus species and Panicum glanduliferum.
