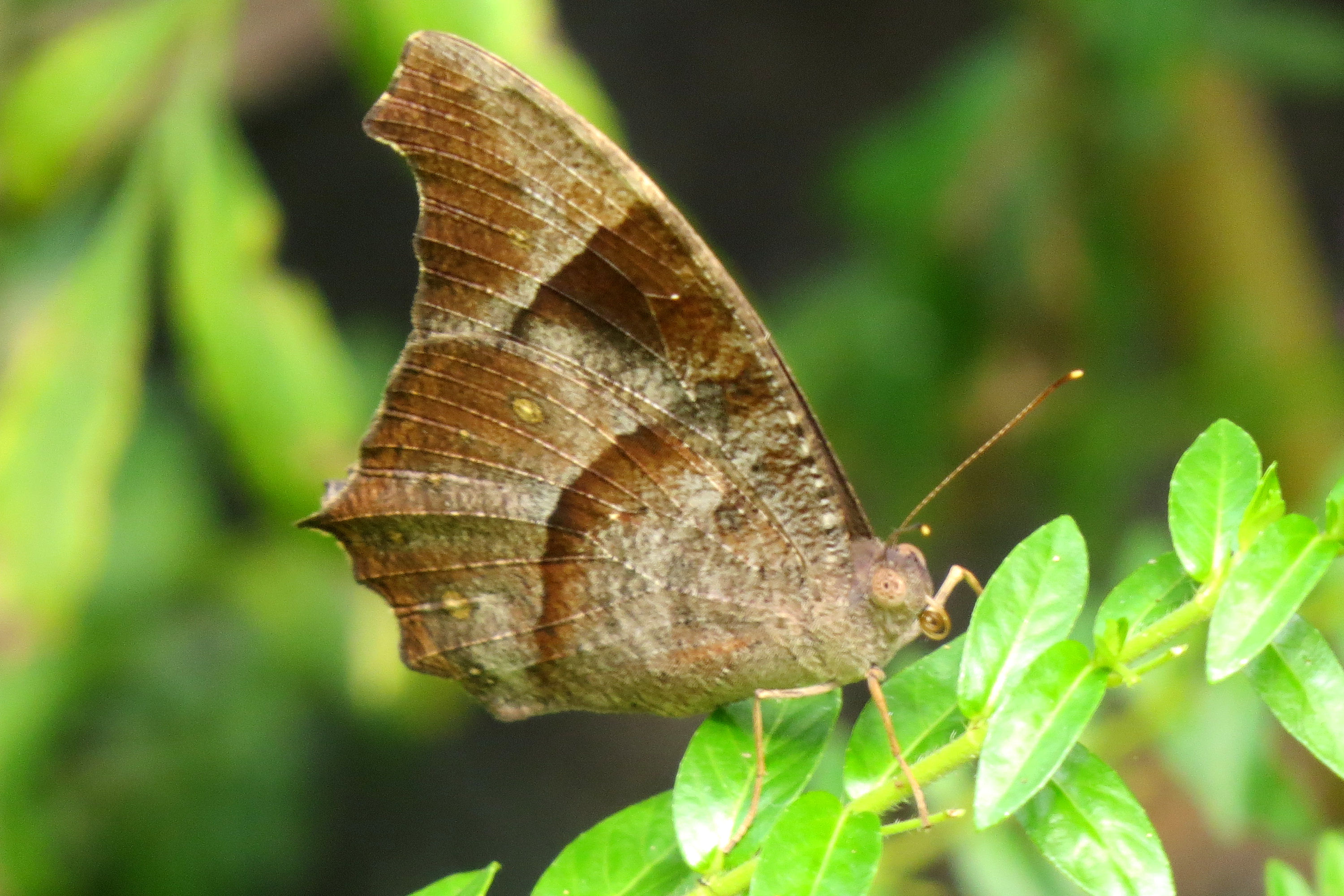
- In Cambodia

Scientific classification
- Domain: Eukaryota
- Kingdom: Animalia
- Phylum: Arthropoda
- Class: Insecta
- Order: Lepidoptera
- Family: Nymphalidae
- Genus: Melanitis
- Species: M. zitenius

Binomial name
- Melanitis zitenius (Herbst, 1796)

Synonyms
- Melanitis vamana Moore, 1857

= Melanitis zitenius =

Great evening brown

Species of butterfly

Melanitis zitenius, the great evening brown, is a species of nymphalid butterfly found in Asia. The species is crepuscular.

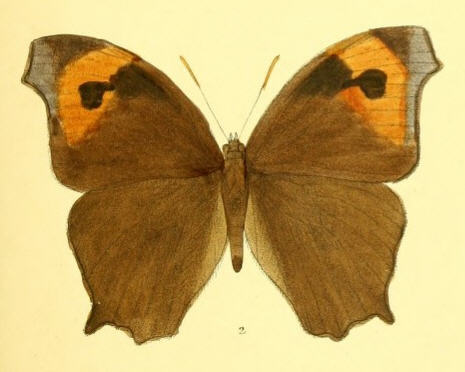
Melanitis zitenius kalinga

== Description ==
Wet-season form. Male and female: Forewing: costa strongly arched, apex acute; termen immediately below apex in male angulate, in female falcate (sickle shaped). Upperside resembles M. ismene, but ground colour on the whole somewhat warmer brown, a very broad patch of ochraceous yellow, above and beyond the subapical black spots, larger in the female than in the male. Underside closely irrorated (sprinkled) with dark brown striae (lines); the ocelli subequal, very much smaller and less clearly defined than in M. ismene.

Dry-season form. Costa of forewing less strongly arched; apex in both sexes very falcate. From the wet-season form it differs in the greater amount of ochraceous yellow on the apex of forewing. This forms a very broad band passing from the costa above and beyond the subapical black spots, spreading below and encircling them except for a narrow band which joins the spots to a large black mark beyond apex of cell. Hindwing with two or three white subterminal spots posteriorly. Underside as in M. ismene but not quite so variable, the ocelli often entirely obsolete.

Food plants include Bambusa arundinacea.
