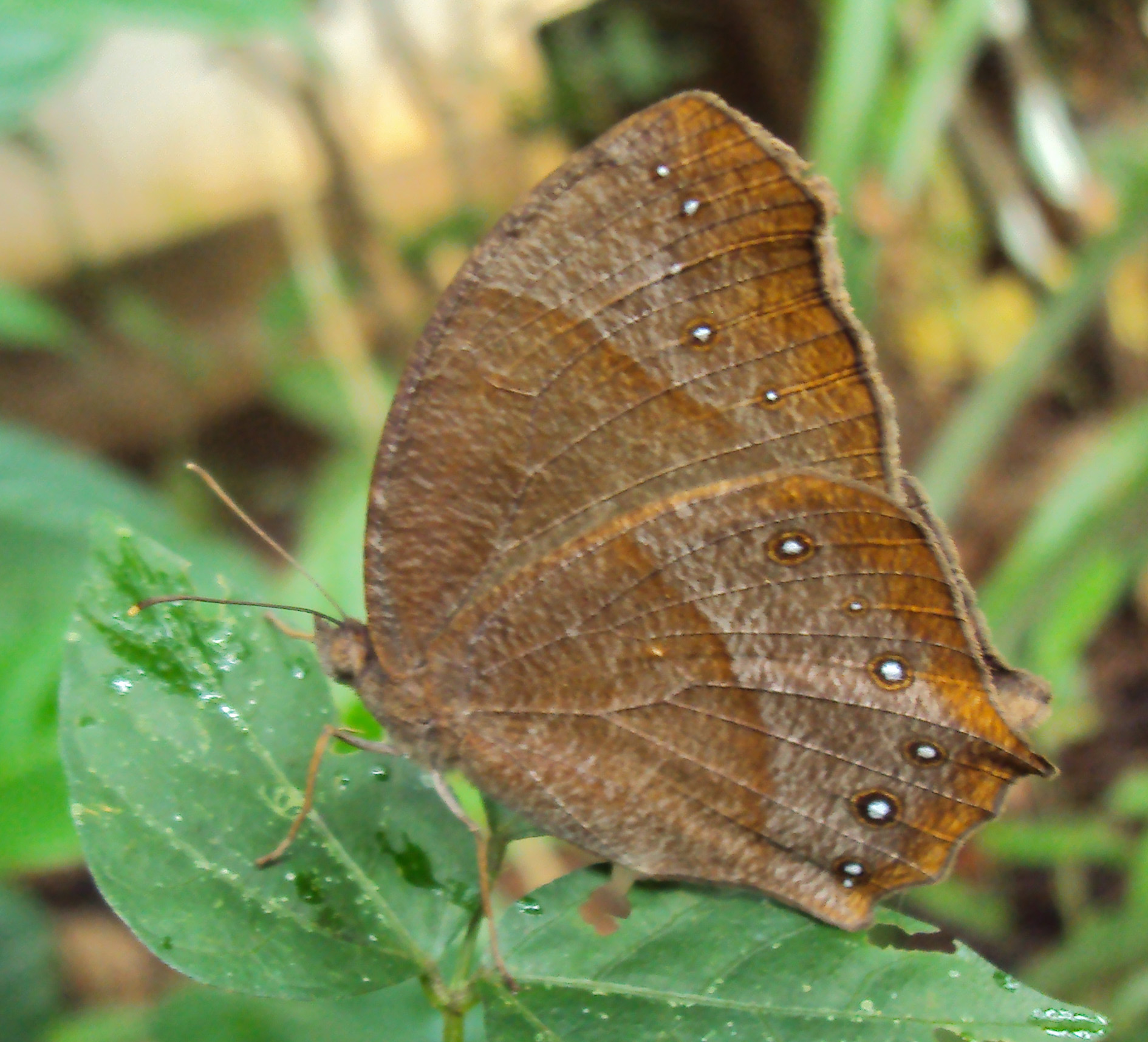
- M. p. bethami wet-season form Kerala, India

Scientific classification
- Domain: Eukaryota
- Kingdom: Animalia
- Phylum: Arthropoda
- Class: Insecta
- Order: Lepidoptera
- Family: Nymphalidae
- Genus: Melanitis
- Species: M. phedima

Binomial name
- Melanitis phedima (Cramer, 1780)

Synonyms
- Melanitis suyudana Moore, 1857; Melanitis bethami de Nicéville, 1887

= Melanitis phedima =

Dark evening brown

Species of butterfly

Melanitis phedima, the dark evening brown, is a species of butterfly found flying at dusk. The flight of this species is erratic. They are found in south and southeast Asia.

== Description ==
Wet-season form: Male. Upperside dusky fuliginous-brown, the outer borders palest; cilia brown. Forewing very slightly angled below the apex; with a well-defined subcostal nearly round ochreous patch before the apex, divided by the brown radial veinlets. Hindwing unmarked. Underside dark purpurescent-brown, densely and uniformly covered with ochreous-cinereous strigae; the outer border ferruginous. Forewing with four ordinary small obscure white-pupilled ocelli. Hindwing with a series of six submarginal prominent ocelli, the upper second minute, the anal geminated, the other four nearly equal and much larger, each pupilled with white. Female. Upperside. Both wings much paler than in the male. Forewing more broadly angled below the apex; with the entire apical area broadly pale ochreous, on which is placed a round black spot with white pupil, situated between the upper and middle median veinlets, also a minute obsolescent ocellus below it and three above it. Hindwing with a small posterior submarginal black spot between the middle aud lower medians, pupilled with white.

Underside. Both wings with the ground colour pale purpurescent ochreous, densely covered with darker brown strigae, the basal area and outer borders of the discal fascia slightly washed with pale purpurescent-cinereous; the ocelli as in the male, but rather larger; the outer margins ochreous. Forewing with an obscure ochreous oblique medial and a waved discal narrow fascia, and the hindwing with a medial excurved similar fascia, the two latter somewhat most defined.

Body beneath, and palpi cinereous-ochreous speckled; legs brown; antennae brown, with a pale ochreous tip.

Dry-season form: Male. Upperside much deeper dusky-brown than in the wet-season form, the colour having a purpurescent tint, and the outer borders are thickly speckled with purpurescent-cinereous scales, Forewing with a more acute and prolonged angle below the apex than in male of the wet-season form; the large apical patch being of a rich ochreous and darkest inwardly, the patch extending from within the end of the cell to the cinereous marginal border; the ocelloid spots being obscurely defined. Hindwing unmarked; the tail much prolonged. Underside very densely purpnrescent-brown or purpurescent olive-brown, the cinerescent strigae very irregular and more or less indistinctly disposed and mottled, the basal area darkest, the outer discal washed with cinereous; the ocelloid spots smaller, very ill-defined. Female. Upperside much paler than in the male, with less distinct cinereous margins. Forewing even more acutely angled below the apex than in male; the rich ochreous apical patch occupying about half the wing, extending more or less well into the cell and to the posterior angle, the enclosed ocelloid spots being present as in the female of the wet-season form, or the two ordinary-disposed subapical black spots are developed, but both well-separated, more or less elongated, and with a distinct white pupil. Eindioing with one, or two, posterior submarginal white dots.

Underside. Both wings dusky ochreous, with uniformly-disposed dark brown strigae, which are sometimes more or less irregularly blotched; the submarginal ocelloid spots also blotched.

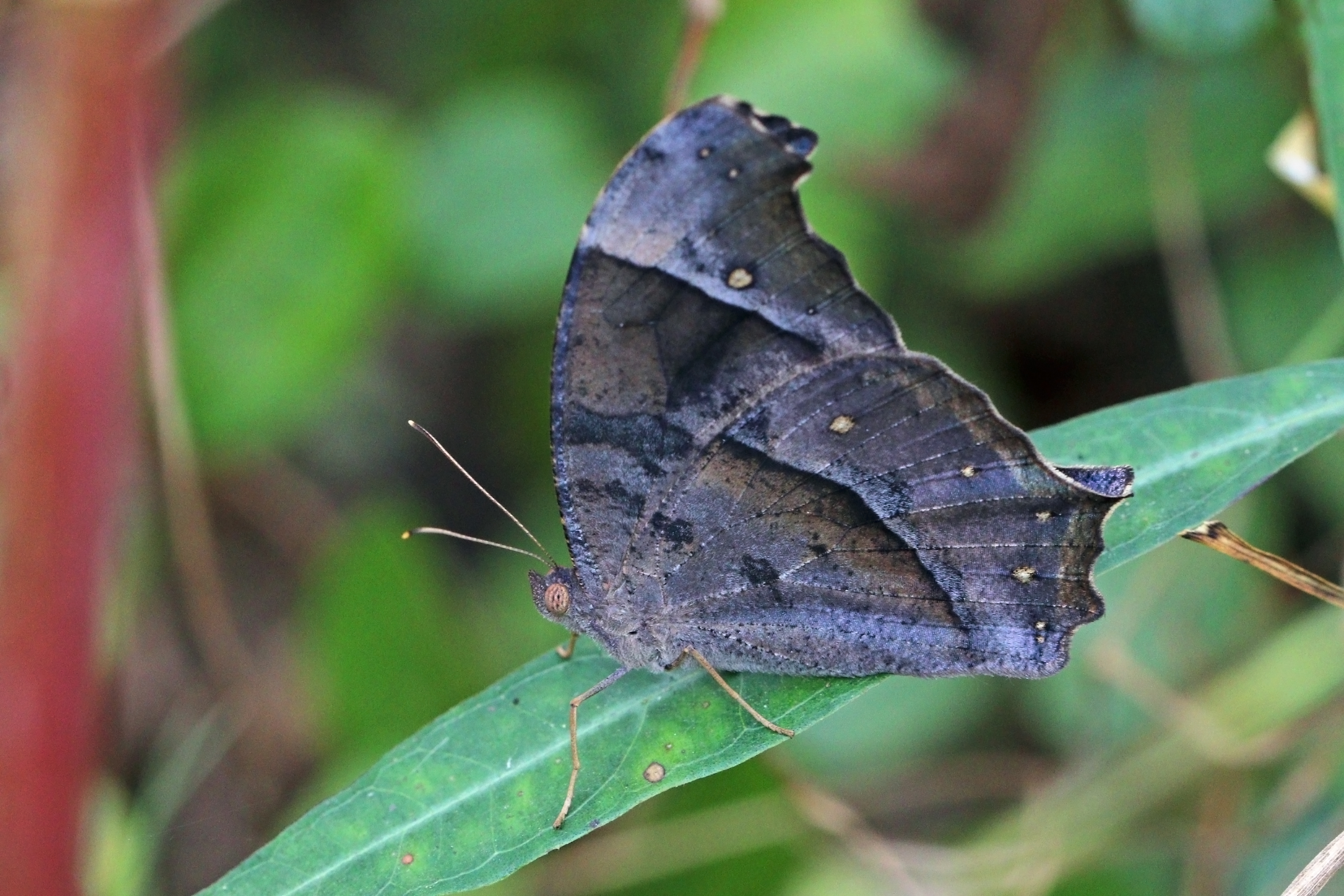
M. p. bethami dry-season form
Madhya Pradesh, India

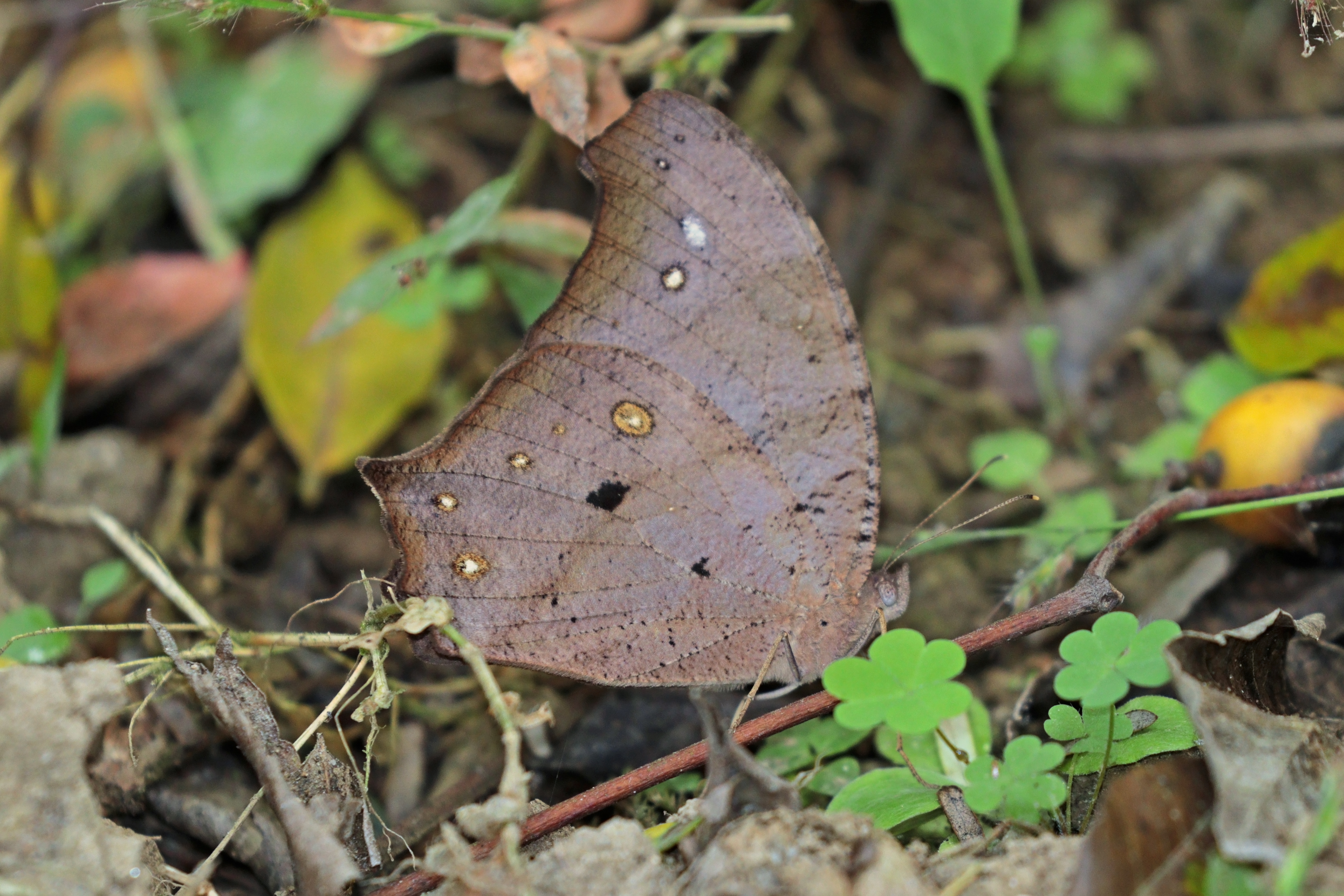
M. p. bela dry-season form
Chitwan, Nepal

== Food plants ==
Ischaemum semisagittatum and a variety of grasses of the genera Andropogon, Cymbopogon, Pennisetum, Setaria, Oplismenus compositus, and Bambusa arundinacea.
