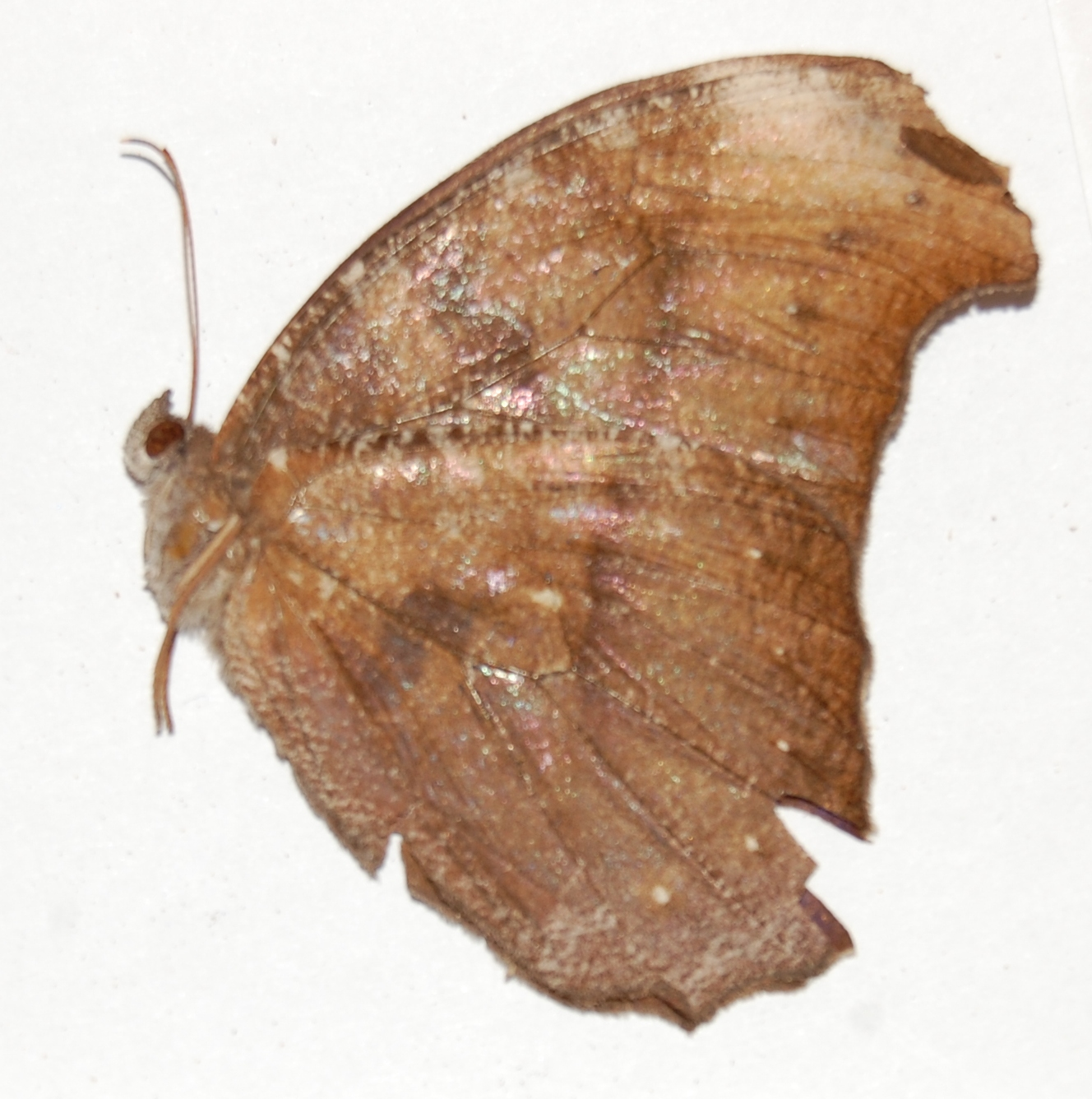

Scientific classification
- Domain: Eukaryota
- Kingdom: Animalia
- Phylum: Arthropoda
- Class: Insecta
- Order: Lepidoptera
- Family: Nymphalidae
- Genus: Melanitis
- Species: M. ansorgei

Binomial name
- Melanitis ansorgei Rothschild, 1904

= Melanitis ansorgei =

Blue evening brown

Species of butterfly

Melanitis ansorgei, the blue evening brown, is a butterfly in the family Nymphalidae. It is found in Ivory Coast, Cameroon, the Central African Republic, the north-east of the Democratic Republic of the Congo, and Uganda (from the western part of the country to the Bwamba Valley). The habitat consists of forests.
