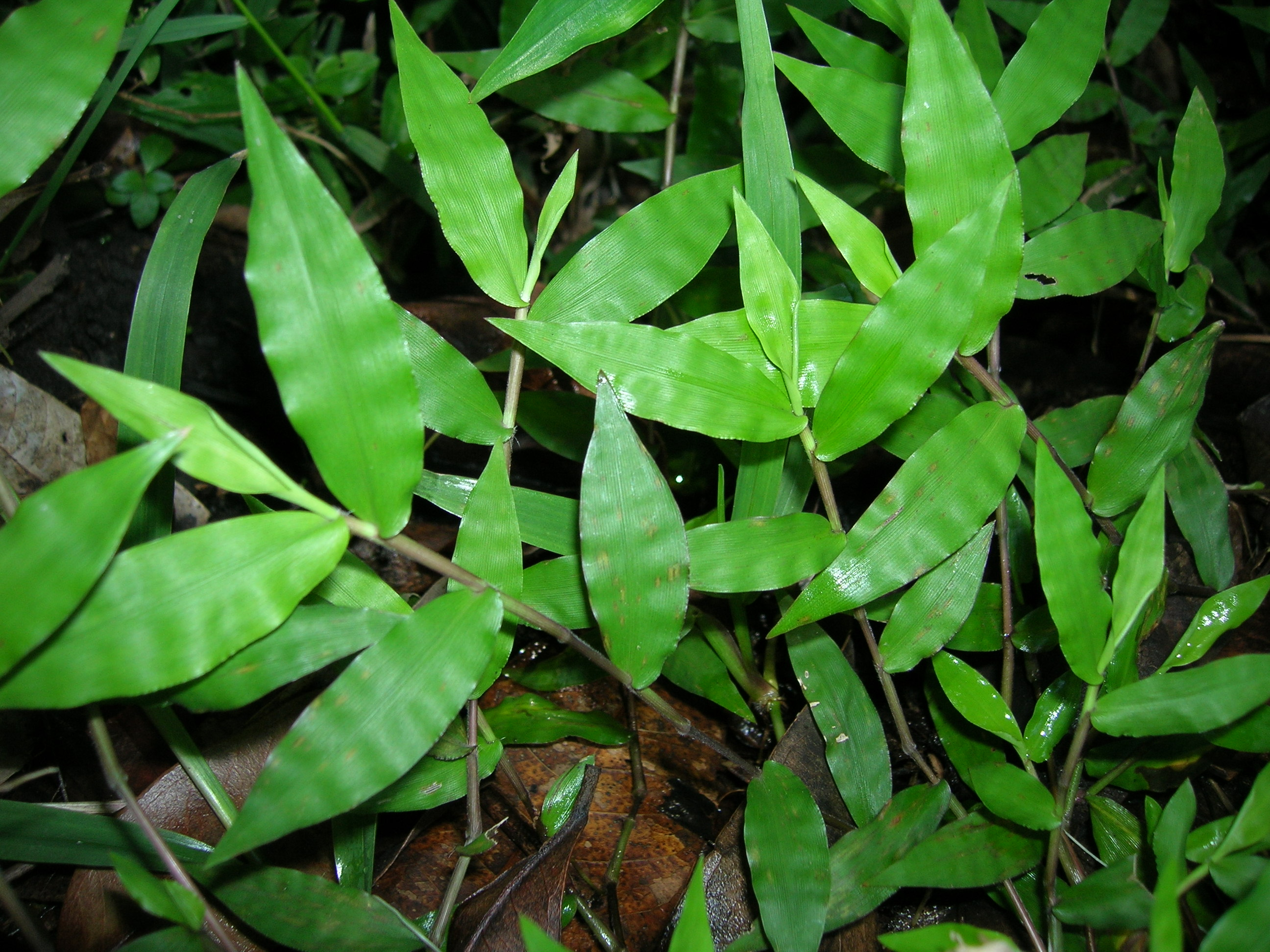

Scientific classification
- Kingdom: Plantae
- Clade: Tracheophytes
- Clade: Angiosperms
- Clade: Monocots
- Clade: Commelinids
- Order: Poales
- Family: Poaceae
- Subfamily: Panicoideae
- Genus: Oplismenus
- Species: O. hirtellus

Binomial name
- Oplismenus hirtellus (L.) P.Beauv.

= Oplismenus hirtellus =

Basket grass

Species of plant

Oplismenus hirtellus, commonly known as basket grass, is a species of flowering perennial plant from the family Poaceae that can be found on every continent in the world except Antarctica, growing mostly in coastal tropic and subtropic regions as well as tropical and subtropical islands such as Hawaii, New Zealand, Australia and Madagascar.

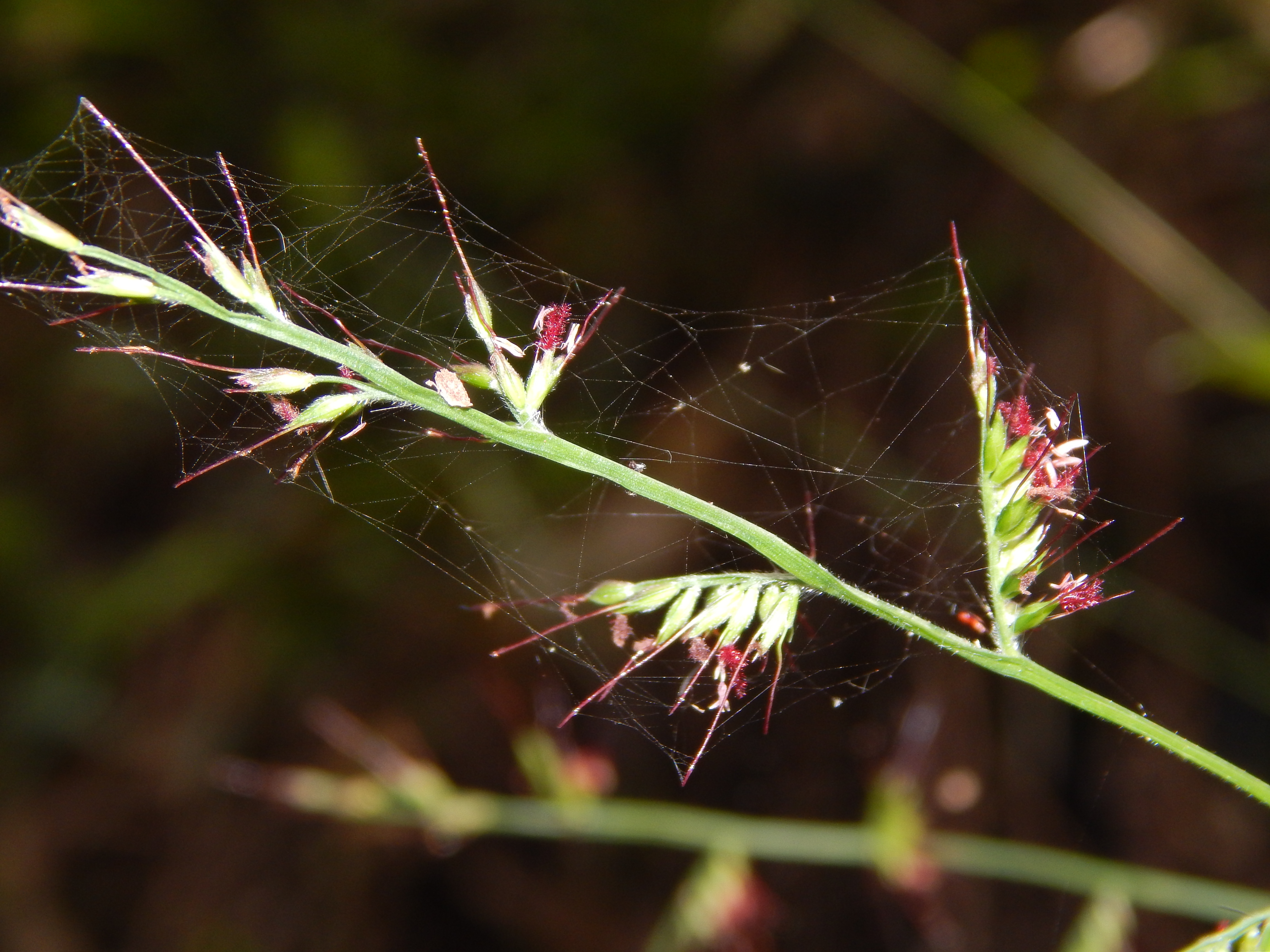
Oplismenus hirtellus flowers are typically deep reddish or purple, whereas a sister species Oplismenus undulatifolius features white or very lightly colored flowers.

== Description ==
The leaves are distinctly crimped. The species flowering stalk is located 200 millimetres (7.9 in) above the leaves with the sticky purple colored awns. Flowers appear from December to June. It grows 0.3 metres (1 ft 0 in) high and has some hairs which have 10-15 nerves on either side. The plant is whitish on the lower surface and is very narrow near midrib.

It is self-pollinated plant whose seeds attract various animals and birds. The sticky seeds are easily distributed by animals and humans, easily adhering to fur and clothing.

== Distribution ==
=== In the United States ===
Oplismenus hirtellus is considered native to the southeastern United States, growing in Alabama, Arkansas, Florida, Georgia, Louisiana, Mississippi, North Carolina, South Carolina, Texas, and Oklahoma.

There has been some disagreement about the taxonomic classification of non-native Oplismenus in several states:

- In Maryland and Virginia an exotic invasive Oplismenus with white flowers was discovered in 1996 and identified as Oplismenus hirtellus subsp. undulatifolius but later recognized as the separate Oplismenus undulatifolius.
- In Hawaii, the grass was recorded in 1819 though not considered native to the state. With deep reddish flowers, the Hawaiian grass is most likely a form of the tropical Oplismenus hirtellus rather than the temperate O. undulatifolius. Because of its presence on the islands for over 150 years, it is referred to as a naturalized non-native, while its dominance in shaded forests suggests the species could be described as invasive.

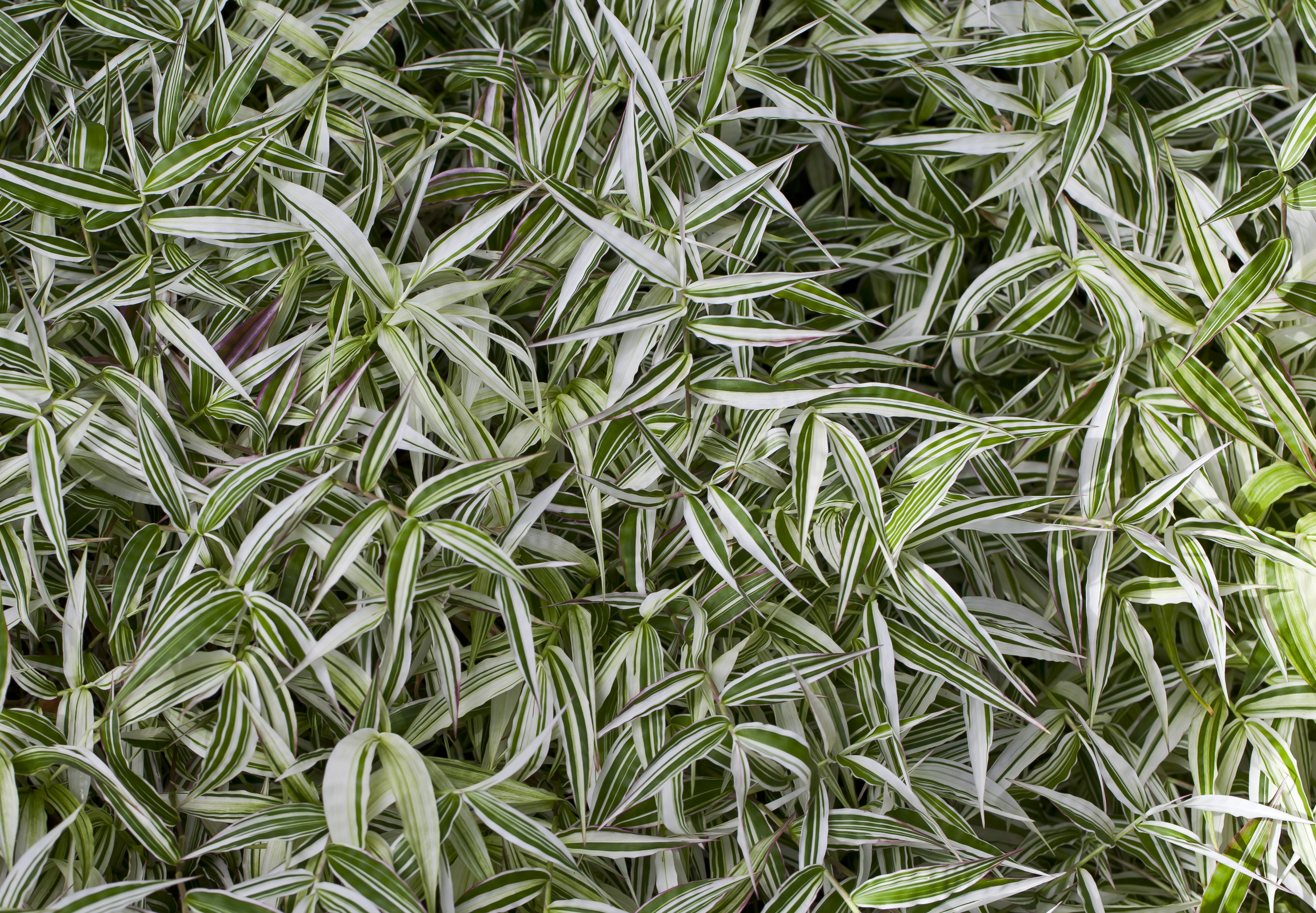
Oplismenus hirtellus 'Variegatus'
