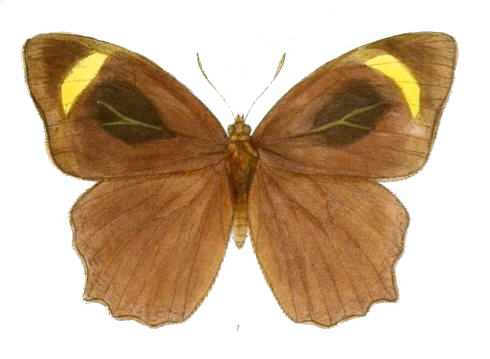

Scientific classification
- Kingdom: Animalia
- Phylum: Arthropoda
- Class: Insecta
- Order: Lepidoptera
- Family: Nymphalidae
- Genus: Cyllogenes
- Species: C. suradeva

Binomial name
- Cyllogenes suradeva (Moore, 1857)

Synonyms
- Melanitis suradeva

= Cyllogenes suradeva =

Species of butterfly

Cyllogenes suradeva, the branded evening brown, is a brown (Satyrinae) butterfly that is found in the Himalayas.

== Range ==
The butterfly is found in the Himalayas in Sikkim and Bhutan.

== Status ==
In 1932 William Harry Evans described it as rare.

== Description ==
The branded evening brown is 75 to 85 mm in wingspan and broadly resembles the Melanitis evening browns, with a strong purple tinge above. The upper forewing has a narrow yellow apical band which does not reach the termen. The male has a large black brand on the upper forewing at the bases of 2 to 5 and the end cell.

== Habits ==
It is a low-elevation butterfly.
