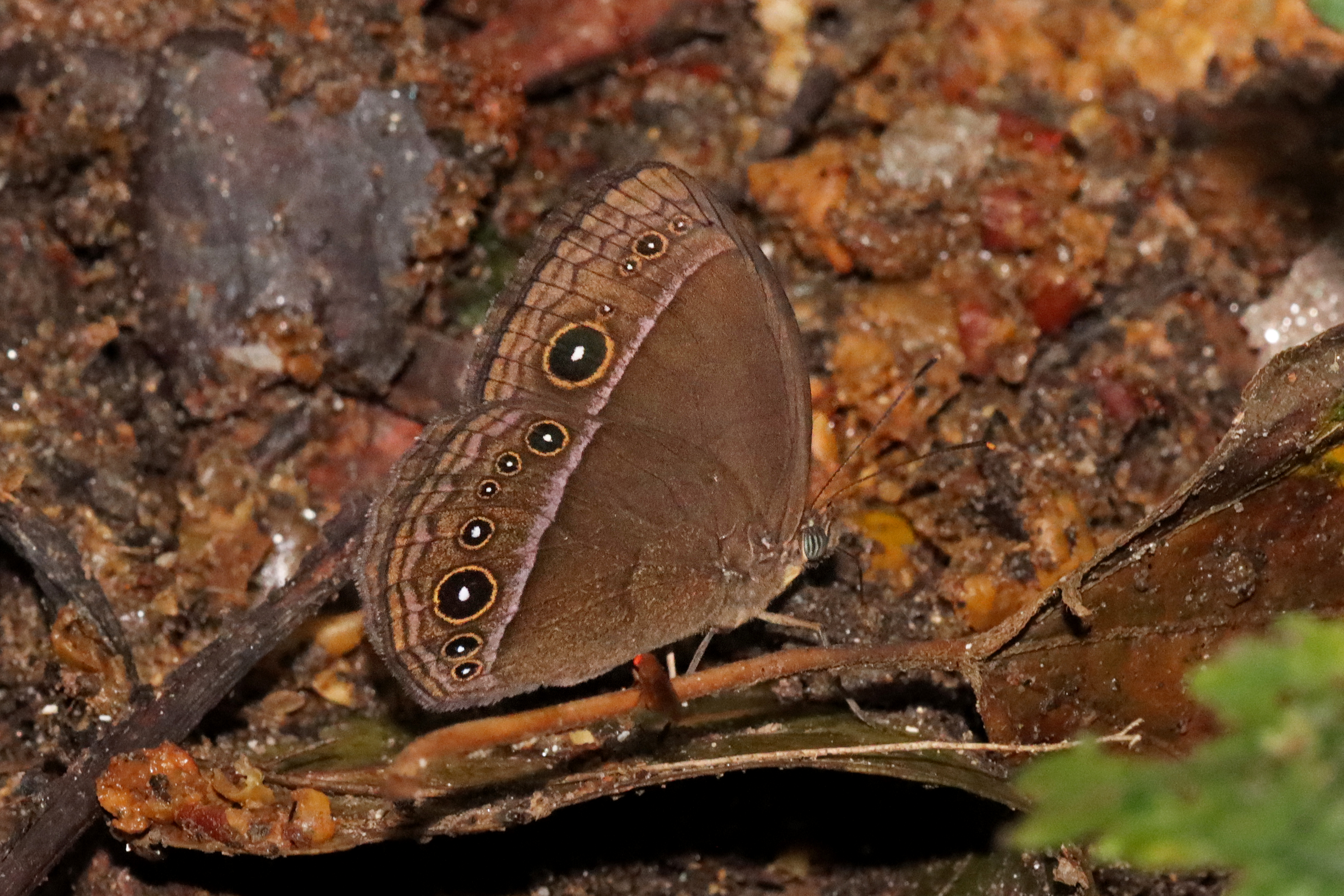

Scientific classification
- Kingdom: Animalia
- Phylum: Arthropoda
- Clade: Pancrustacea
- Class: Insecta
- Order: Lepidoptera
- Family: Nymphalidae
- Genus: Mycalesis
- Species: M. francisca

Binomial name
- Mycalesis francisca (Stoll, [1780])

Synonyms
- Papilio francisca Stoll, [1780]; Mycalesis perdiccas Hewitson, 1862; Mycalesis magna Leech, [1892]; Mycalesis penicillata Poujade, 1884; Mycalesis perdiccas var. horishana Matsumura, 1909; Mycalesis sanatana var. coronensis Matsumura, 1909; Mycalesis sanatana gomia Fruhstorfer, 1908; Mycalesis vercella Fruhstorfer, 1911; Mycalesis latistriata Mell, 1942; Mycalesis francisca formosana f. hirtia Fruhstorfer, 1908; Mycalesis sanatana Moore, [1858]; Mycalesis gopa C. & R. Felder, [1867]; Mycalesis albofasciata Tytler, 1914

= Mycalesis francisca =

Species of butterfly

Mycalesis francisca is an East Palearctic species of satyrine butterfly found in China, Japan, Korea, India (Assam), Burma and Indochina

The larva feeds on Imperata cylindrica, Miscanthus sinensis, Setaria palmifolia and Oplismenus undulatifolius

== Subspecies ==
- M. f. francisca
- M. f. ulia Fruhstorfer, 1908 (northern Vietnam)
- M. f. formosana Fruhstorfer, 1908 (Taiwan)
- M. f. sanatana Moore, [1858] (India to Burma, Thailand, Laos, South Yunnan)
- M. f. albofasciata Tytler, 1914 (Manipur, Burma, Northwest Yunnan)
- M. f. arisana Sonan, 1931 (Taiwan)
- M. f. perdiccas Hewitson, [1862] (Japan)
