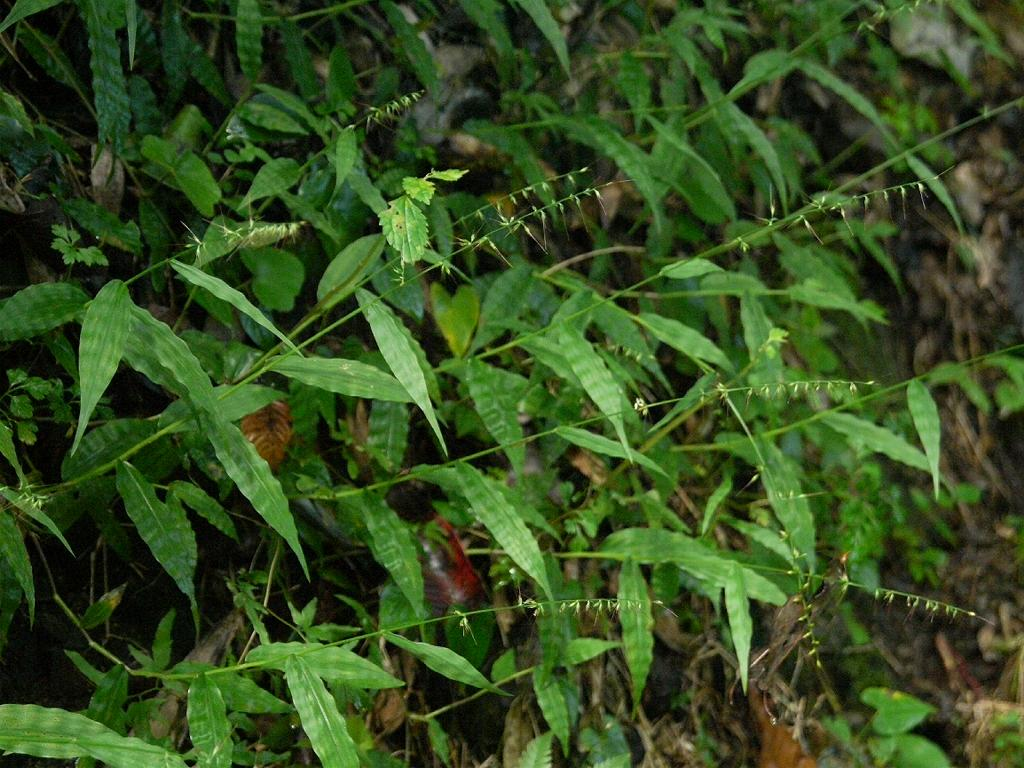

Scientific classification
- Kingdom: Plantae
- Clade: Embryophytes
- Clade: Tracheophytes
- Clade: Spermatophytes
- Clade: Angiosperms
- Clade: Monocots
- Clade: Commelinids
- Order: Poales
- Family: Poaceae
- Subfamily: Panicoideae
- Genus: Oplismenus
- Species: O. undulatifolius

Binomial name
- Oplismenus undulatifolius (Ard.) P. Beauv. 1812

Synonyms
- Oplismenus hirtellus subsp. undulatifolius (Ard.) U. Scholz; Panicum acuminatissimum Steud.; Panicum barbifultum Hochst. ex Schlecht.; Panicum undulatifolium Ard.

= Oplismenus undulatifolius =

Wavyleaf basketgrass

Species of grass

Oplismenus undulatifolius, commonly known as wavyleaf basketgrass, is a species of perennial grass from the family Poaceae that is native to Eurasia, specifically Southern Europe through Southern Asia. Due to its invasive nature, it can be found in countries such as Pakistan (Punjab & Kashmir), China, Japan, Korea, India, Australia, South Africa, and has since been introduced to the Mid-Atlantic United States. There are no recognized subspecies in Catalogue of Life.

== Description ==
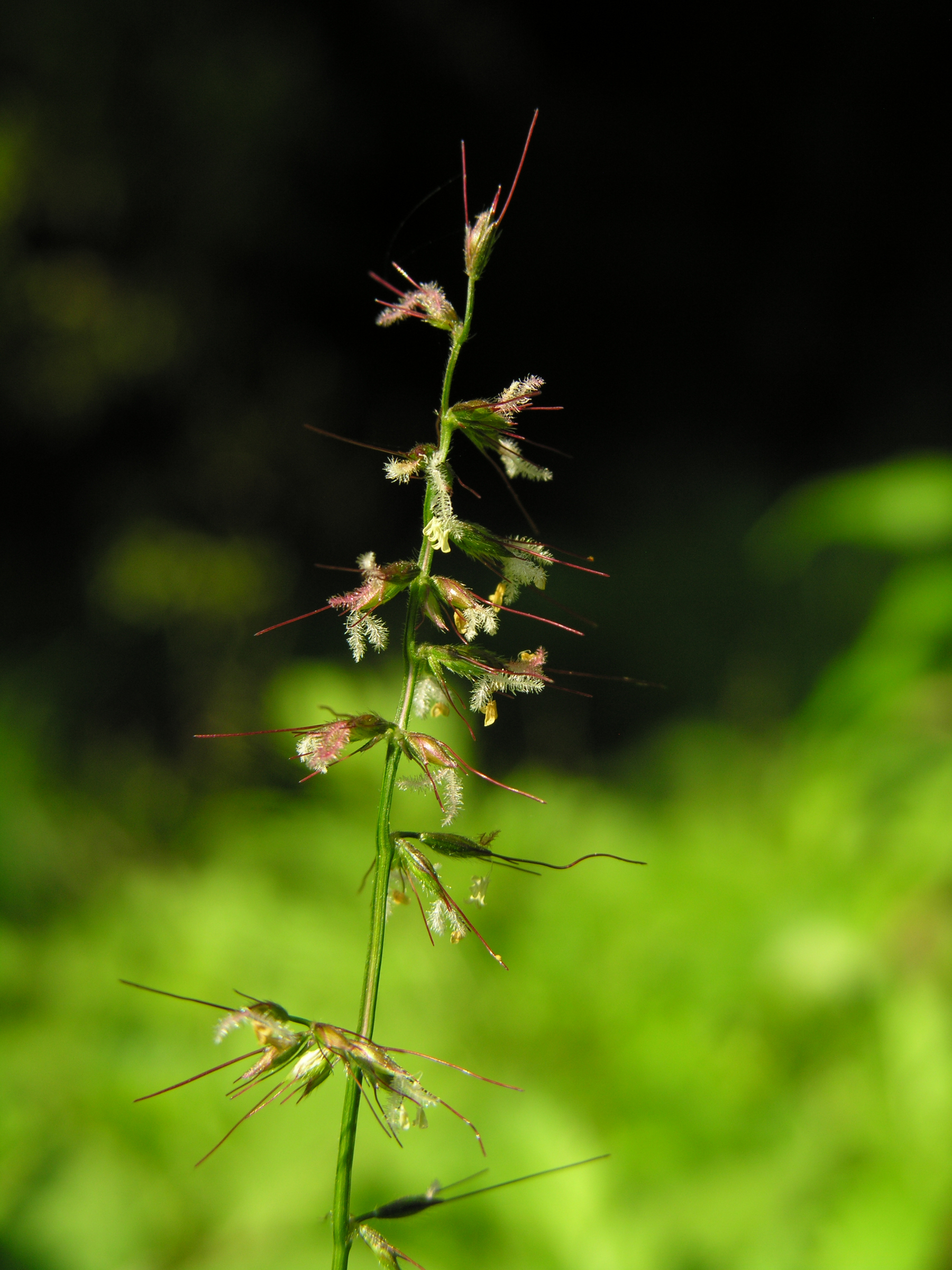
Flowers of Oplismenus undulatifolius are typically very light in color compared to the deep-red flowers of Oplismenus hirtellus.

Oplismenus undulatifolius is a shallow rooted perennial with stolons that may grow to several feet in length. The leaves are distinctly crimped or undulating. The leaves of overwintering plants become brown and dead, but in the spring, new growth begins at the upper nodes of the stolons. In early fall, the sticky awns readily adhere to anything that brushes against them which makes for an effective mode of dispersal.

The species is 15–50 centimetres (5.9–19.7 in) long with leaf-blades being slightly lanceolate, ovate, and are 1–7 centimetres (0.39–2.76 in) long and 4–15 millimetres (0.16–0.59 in) wide. Its inflorescence is 2–8 centimetres (0.79–3.15 in) long and is made out of 5-11 cuneate fascicles which are 0.5–1.5 centimetres (0.20–0.59 in) in length and carry 2-6 spikelets. Spikelets are lanceolate just like leaf-blades, and are 2.5–4 millimetres (0.098–0.157 in) in length. They are also glabrous and pubescent and have glumes which have smooth viscid awns which are 7–14 millimetres (0.28–0.55 in) long. The awns of lower glumes are purple, are 5–10 millimetres (0.20–0.39 in) in length and are 3-5 veined. The lower lemma is herbaceous and have 5-9 veins while the upper one is 5 veined with an awn that is 2–5 millimetres (0.079–0.197 in). The species apex have a stout that is 1–2 millimetres (0.039–0.079 in) long. Flowers and fruits grow from July to November.

This species grows particularly well in moist, shaded environments, in a variety of soil types. In Australia it grows in shady coastal forests at Coffs Harbour.

== Ecology ==
In its native range, Oplismenus undulatifolius is a food source for many species of Lepidoptera, including Elachista kurokoi, Helcystogramma fuscomarginatum, Mycalesis francisca, Mycalesis sangaica, Mycalesis zonata, Palaeonympha opalina, Stigmella oplismeniella, Ypthima akragas, Ypthima baldus, and Ypthima esakii.

=== As an invasive species ===
Accidentally introduced into the United States in Maryland and Virginia, this species spreads quickly and is becoming extremely invasive in forested natural areas in the Mid-Atlantic region across numerous counties in Maryland and Virginia.

The species was first reported in Maryland in 1996, growing around the Liberty Reservoir area and the northern section of the Patapsco River in Howard County. The grass spread quickly into connected natural areas in Baltimore and Carroll counties. By 1999 it was identified in Montgomery County at Wheaton Regional Park. In 2006 it was identified in Prince George's County at Little Paint Branch Park , the adjacent Beltsville Agricultural Research Center-East and the National Greenbelt Park. It had crossed into Virginia by 2004 where it was found growing at an 80-acre (320,000 m^{2}) site in Shenandoah National Park, and in a 20–30-acre (81,000–121,000 m^{2}) site at the Fraser Preserve along the Potomac River in Fairfax County, Virginia. As of 2026, this plant is firmly established in Smith County (east)Texas. Once a population has become established, complete eradication from a site has proven to be extremely difficult due to a long-lived perennial life cycle, a long seed germination season (April–November), and considerable seed mobility of the species.

== Gallery ==
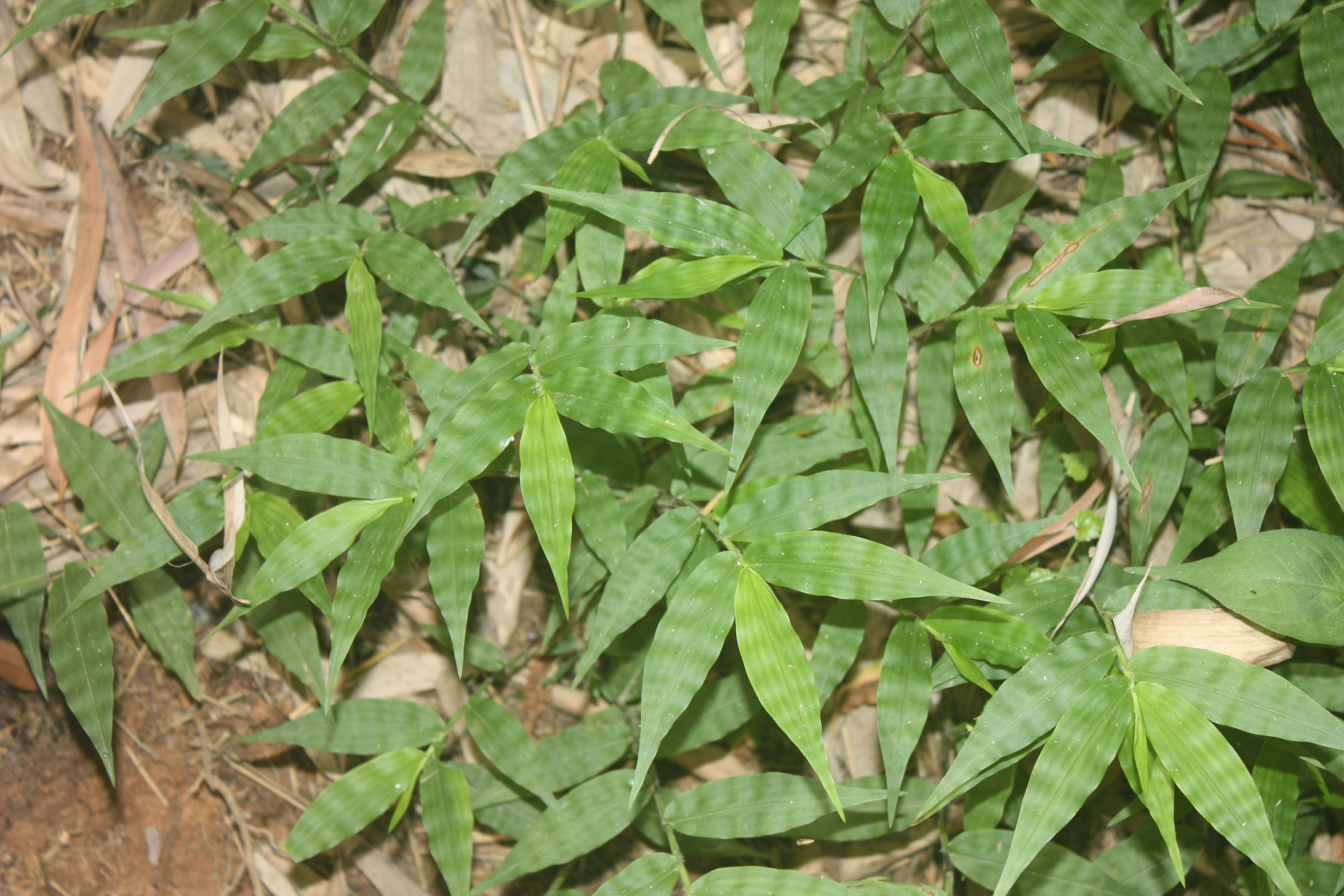
Oplismenus undulatifolius growing under bamboo in Damyang, Korea.

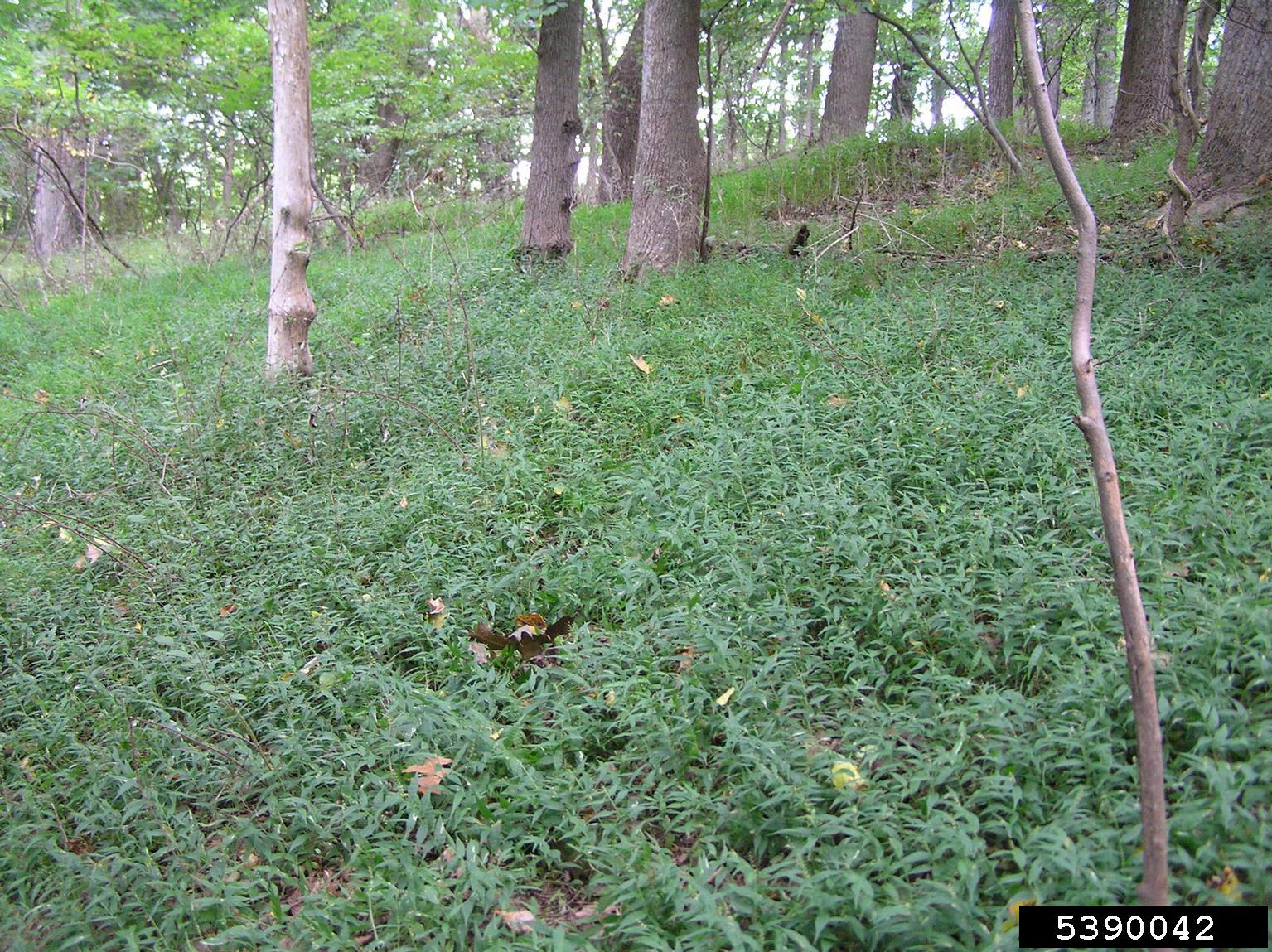
Wavyleaf basketgrass infestation. Habitat: closed-canopy mesic forest in Maryland, United States.

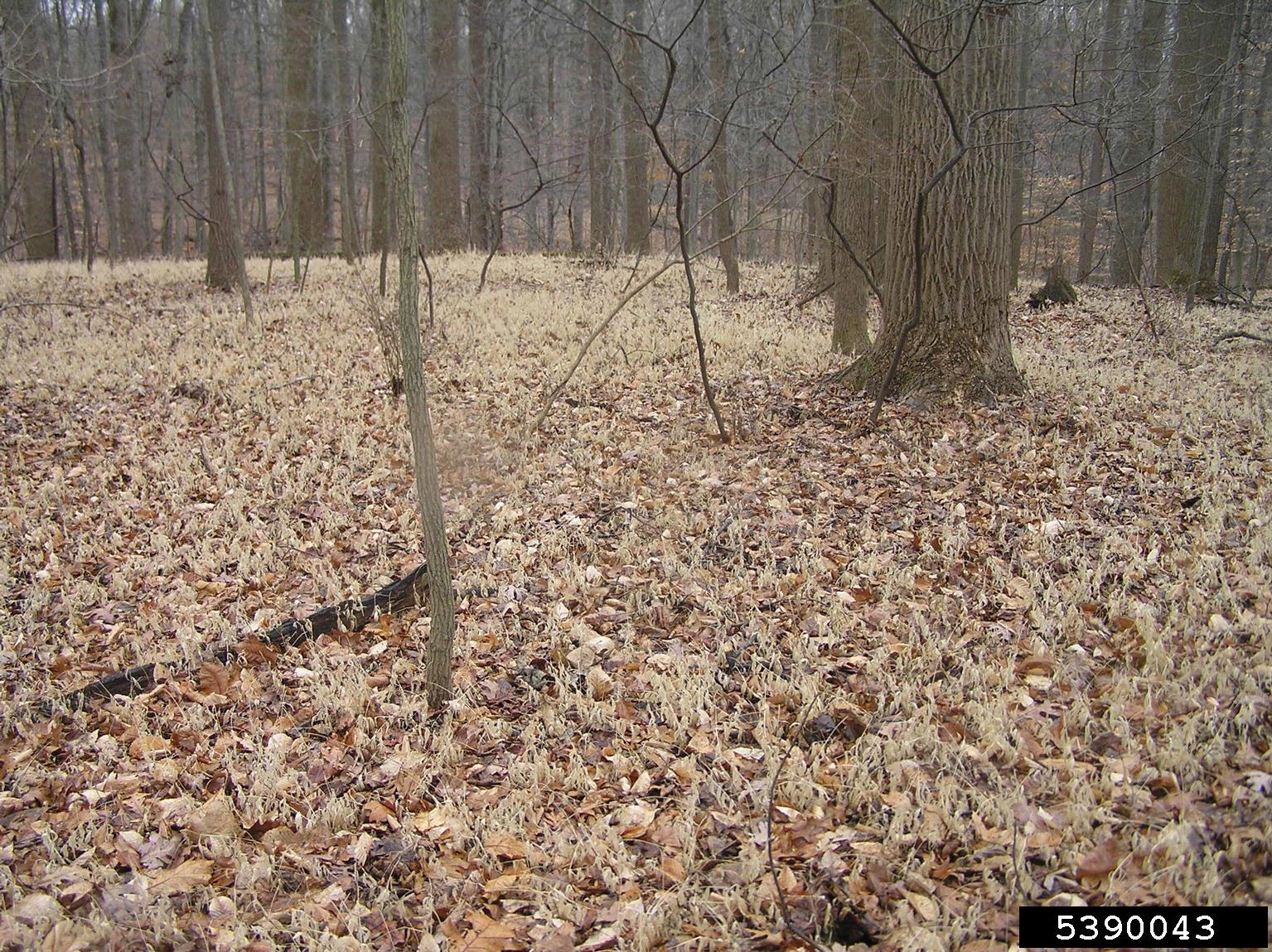
Leaves of the perennial wavyleaf basketgrass die off each winter (mid-December shown). Plants will survive cold winters and leaves will re-emerge each spring. Photo shows winter appearance of non-native infestation in Maryland, United States.

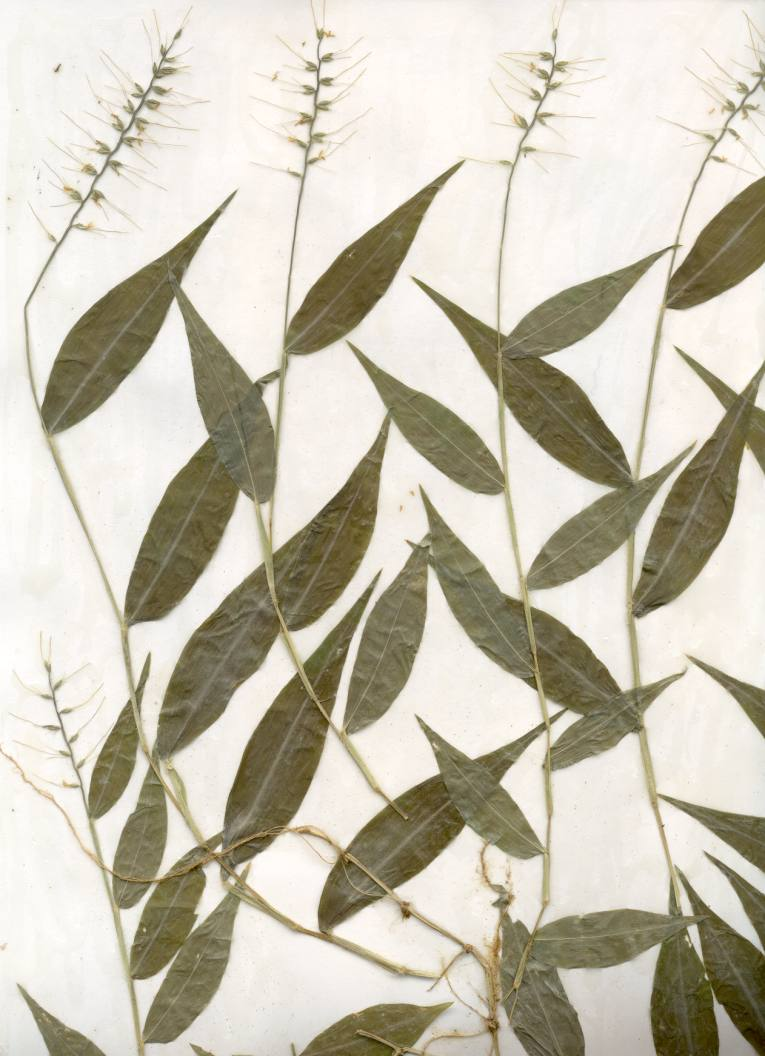
Invasive wavyleaf basketgrasss collected from Liberty Reservoir in Maryland in 1997.

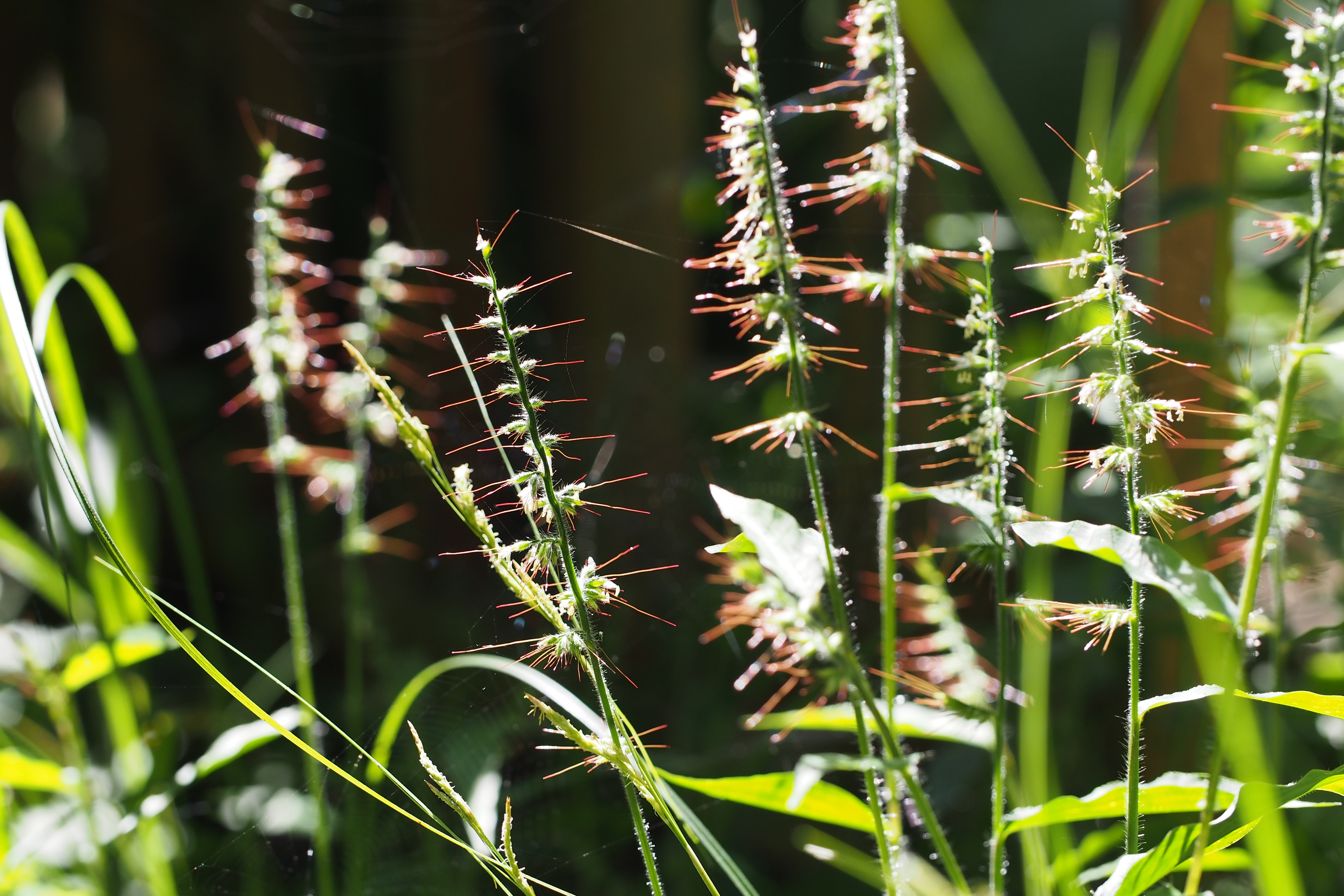
Oplismenus undulatifolius with reddish purple awns and white flowers in Kobe, Japan.
