= Oplismenus thwaitesii =

Scientific classification
- Kingdom: Plantae
- Clade: Tracheophytes
- Clade: Angiosperms
- Clade: Monocots
- Clade: Commelinids
- Order: Poales
- Family: Poaceae
- Subfamily: Panicoideae
- Genus: Oplismenus
- Species: O. thwaitesii

Binomial name
- Oplismenus thwaitesii Hook.

Species of grass

Oplismenus thwaitesii is a flowering plant that is endemic to India.

== Description ==
The species' culms are prostrate and are 10–25 centimetres (3.9–9.8 in) long. The leaf-blades are ovate and are 1–3 centimetres (0.39–1.18 in) long and 2.5–5 millimetres (0.098–0.197 in) wide. It has an obscure cross veins venation. The species also has 3–4 unilateral racemes which are located along the central axis, and are 1–2 centimetres (0.39–0.79 in) long. The central part of the inflorescence axis is 3–6 centimetres (1.2–2.4 in) long. It also has angular rachis which bottom is glabrous. The spikelets grow in pairs and are 2–5 millimetres (0.079–0.197 in) apart from each other. They are also fertile, pedicelled, and sessile, with pedicels being oblong. They grow in a cluster of 2 and are subequal. Glumes are shorter than a spikelet and thinner than fertile lemma. The lower glume is ovate and have a pubescent surface. Its apex is acute and 1 awned. The awn is 0.5–1.5 millimetres (0.020–0.059 in) long, has no vesture, but is scaberulous. The upper glume is ovate as well but is herbaceous, 1-keeled and has veins of 5–7. Just like the lower glume, it is pubescent on the bottom but has an obtuse apex which can also be mucronate or muticous as well. Florets are 1-keeled and pubescent just like glumes but are 7-11 veined. The lower sterile floret of the lemma is ovate and is 1 length of a spikelet which is also emarginate, membranous and mucronate. The fertile lemma is coriaceous, keelless, oblong, shiny and is 2–2.5 millimetres (0.079–0.098 in) long with involute margins and acute apex.
