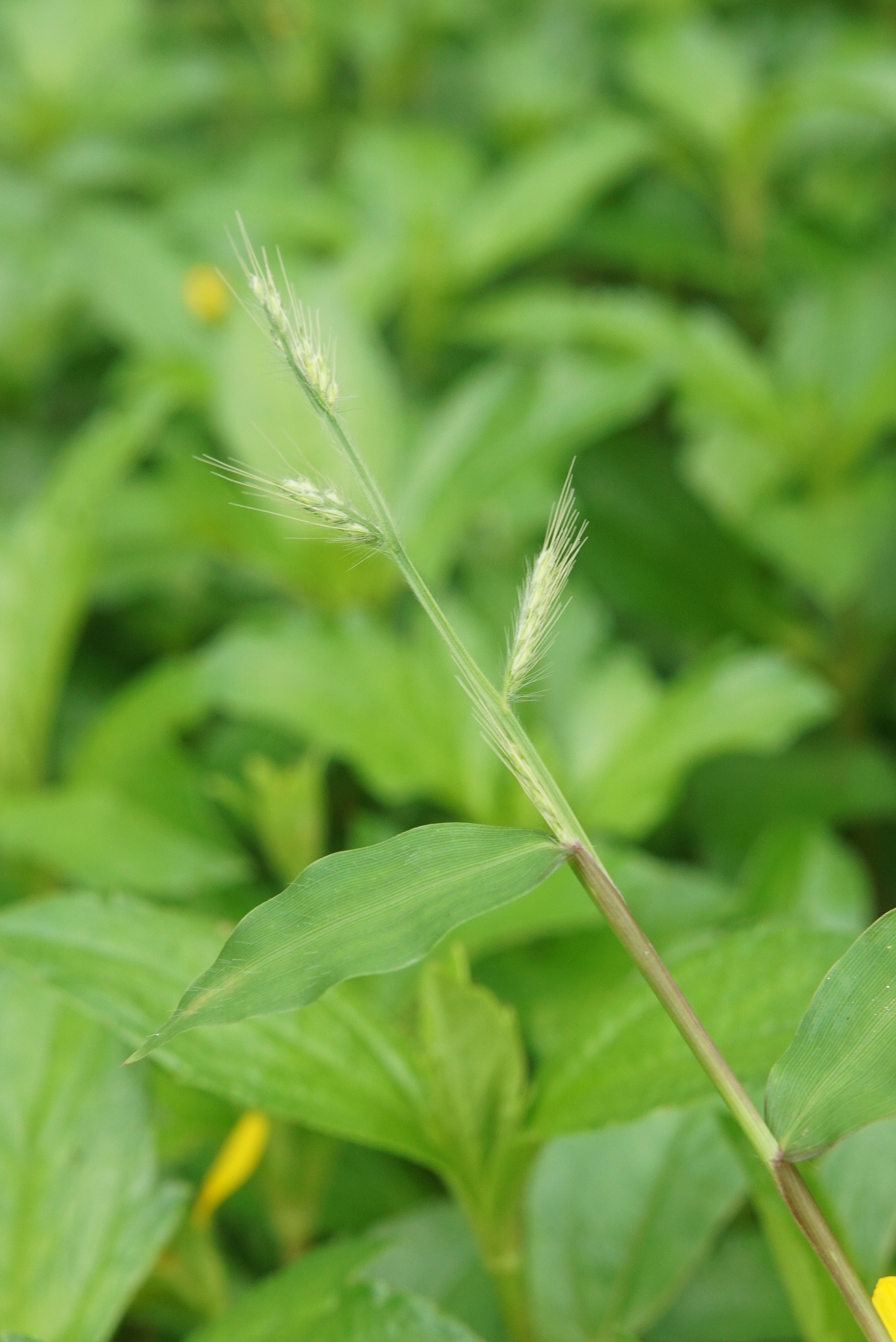

Scientific classification
- Kingdom: Plantae
- Clade: Tracheophytes
- Clade: Angiosperms
- Clade: Monocots
- Clade: Commelinids
- Order: Poales
- Family: Poaceae
- Subfamily: Panicoideae
- Genus: Oplismenus
- Species: O. burmannii

Binomial name
- Oplismenus burmannii (Retz.) P. Beauv.

= Oplismenus burmannii =

Species of grass

Oplismenus burmannii (commonly known as Burmann's basketgrass) is a flowering plant that can be found in Florida and on Hawaii, but is native to Zimbabwe.

== Description ==
The plant's leaves are 5 centimetres (2.0 in) long and 1.5 centimetres (0.59 in) wide and are undulate as well. Its glumes are of pinkish-red colour and are much longer than the spikelet. Its inflorescence is 2.5 centimetres (0.98 in) and consists of a small number of short racemes, which have spikelets on them, which are attached to the central axis.

== Habitat ==
It is found at elevations of 1,600 metres (5,200 ft).
