= Stigmella oplismeniella =

Scientific classification
- Kingdom: Animalia
- Phylum: Arthropoda
- Clade: Pancrustacea
- Class: Insecta
- Order: Lepidoptera
- Family: Nepticulidae
- Genus: Stigmella
- Species: S. oplismeniella

Binomial name
- Stigmella oplismeniella Kemperman & Wilkinson, 1985

Species of moth

Stigmella oplismeniella is a moth of the family Nepticulidae. It is only known from Kyushu in Japan.

Adult are on wing from mid-May to early June. There is probably one generation per year.

The larvae feed on Oplismenus undulatifolius. They mine the leaves of their host plant.
