= Helcystogramma fuscomarginatum =

Scientific classification
- Domain: Eukaryota
- Kingdom: Animalia
- Phylum: Arthropoda
- Class: Insecta
- Order: Lepidoptera
- Family: Gelechiidae
- Genus: Helcystogramma
- Species: H. fuscomarginatum

Binomial name
- Helcystogramma fuscomarginatum Ueda, 1995

Species of moth

Helcystogramma fuscomarginatum is a moth in the family Gelechiidae. It was described by Ueda in 1995. It is known from Japan, Korea and Guangdong, China.

The larvae feed on Oplismenus undulatifolius.
