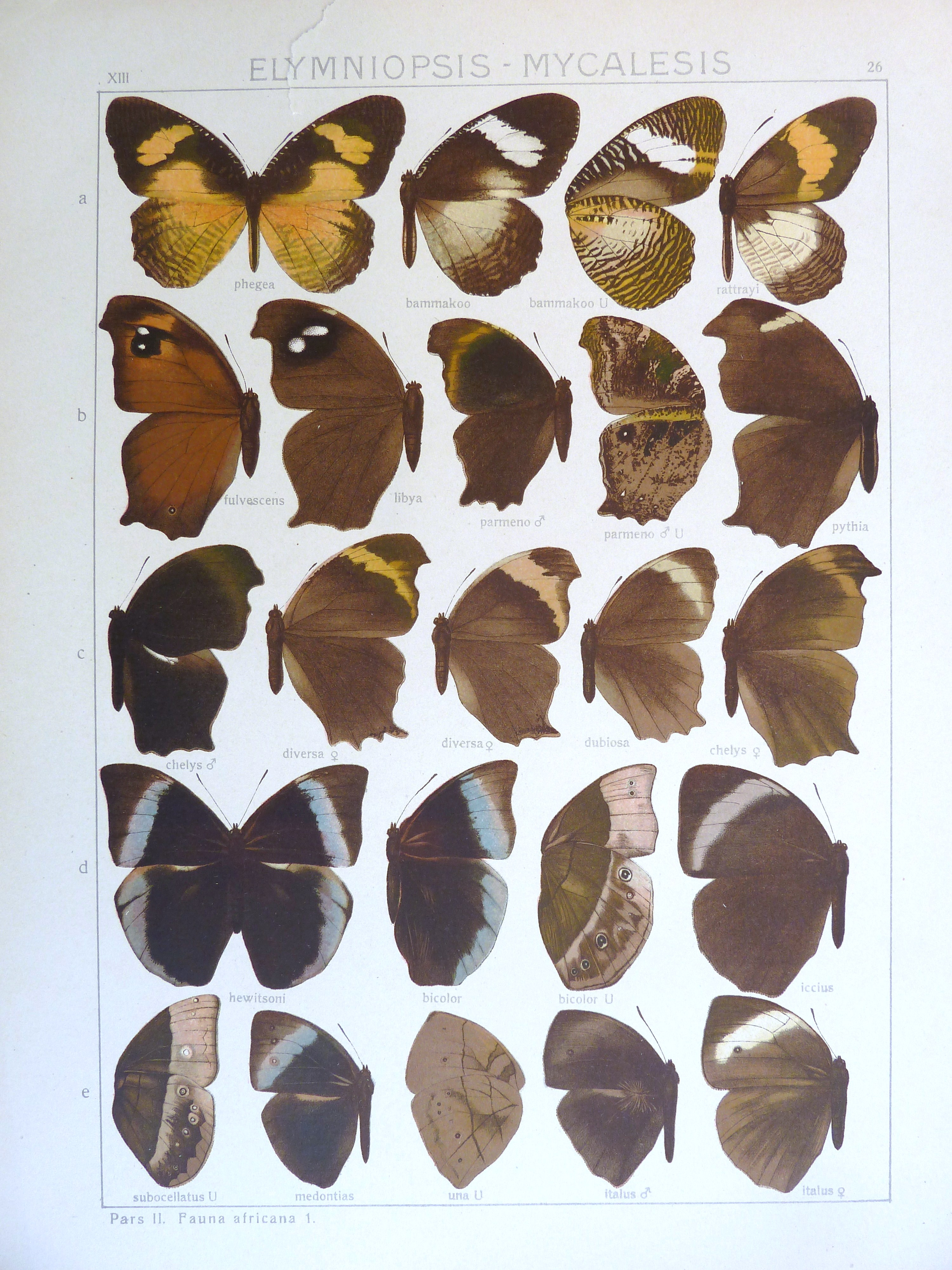
- In Adalbert Seitz's Fauna Africana

Scientific classification
- Kingdom: Animalia
- Phylum: Arthropoda
- Clade: Pancrustacea
- Class: Insecta
- Order: Lepidoptera
- Family: Nymphalidae
- Genus: Melanitis
- Species: M. libya

Binomial name
- Melanitis libya Distant, 1882

Synonyms
- Melanitis libya nyassae Bartel, 1905; Melanitis libya f. pinheyi van Son, 1962

= Melanitis libya =

Violet-eyed evening brown

Species of butterfly

Melanitis libya, the violet-eyed evening brown, is a butterfly in the family Nymphalidae. It is found in Senegal, the Gambia, Guinea-Bissau, Mali, Guinea, Sierra Leone, Ivory Coast, Ghana, Nigeria, Niger, Chad, southern Sudan, Semuliki National Park, western Uganda and north-western Uganda, Ethiopia, Kenya, Tanzania, the Democratic Republic of the Congo (Shaba), Malawi, Zambia, Mozambique, and eastern Zimbabwe. The habitat consists of forests at altitudes between 600 and 900 meters.

Adults are on wing year round. There are wet- and dry-season forms.

The larvae feed on Oxytenanthra abyssinica.
