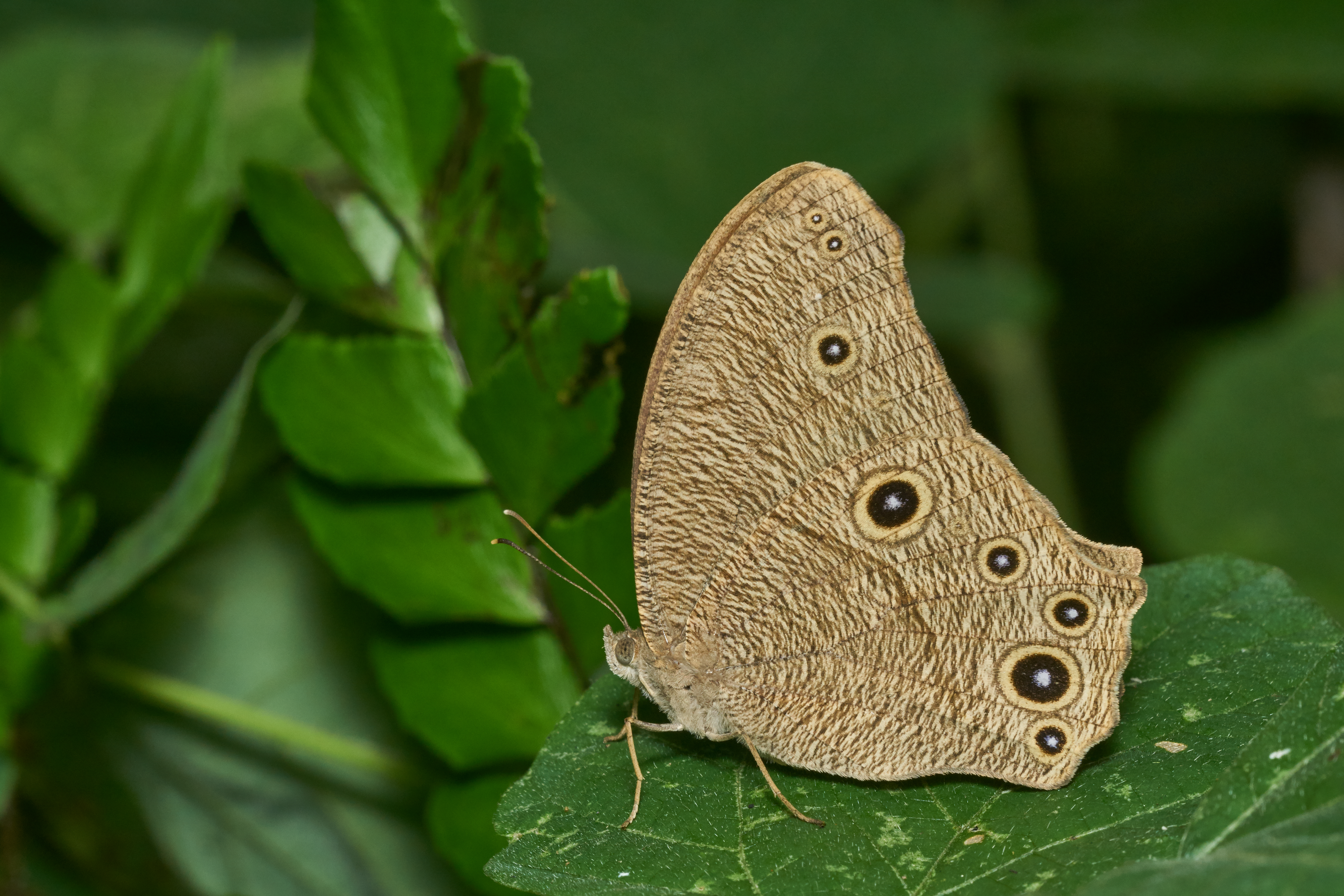
- Wet-season form
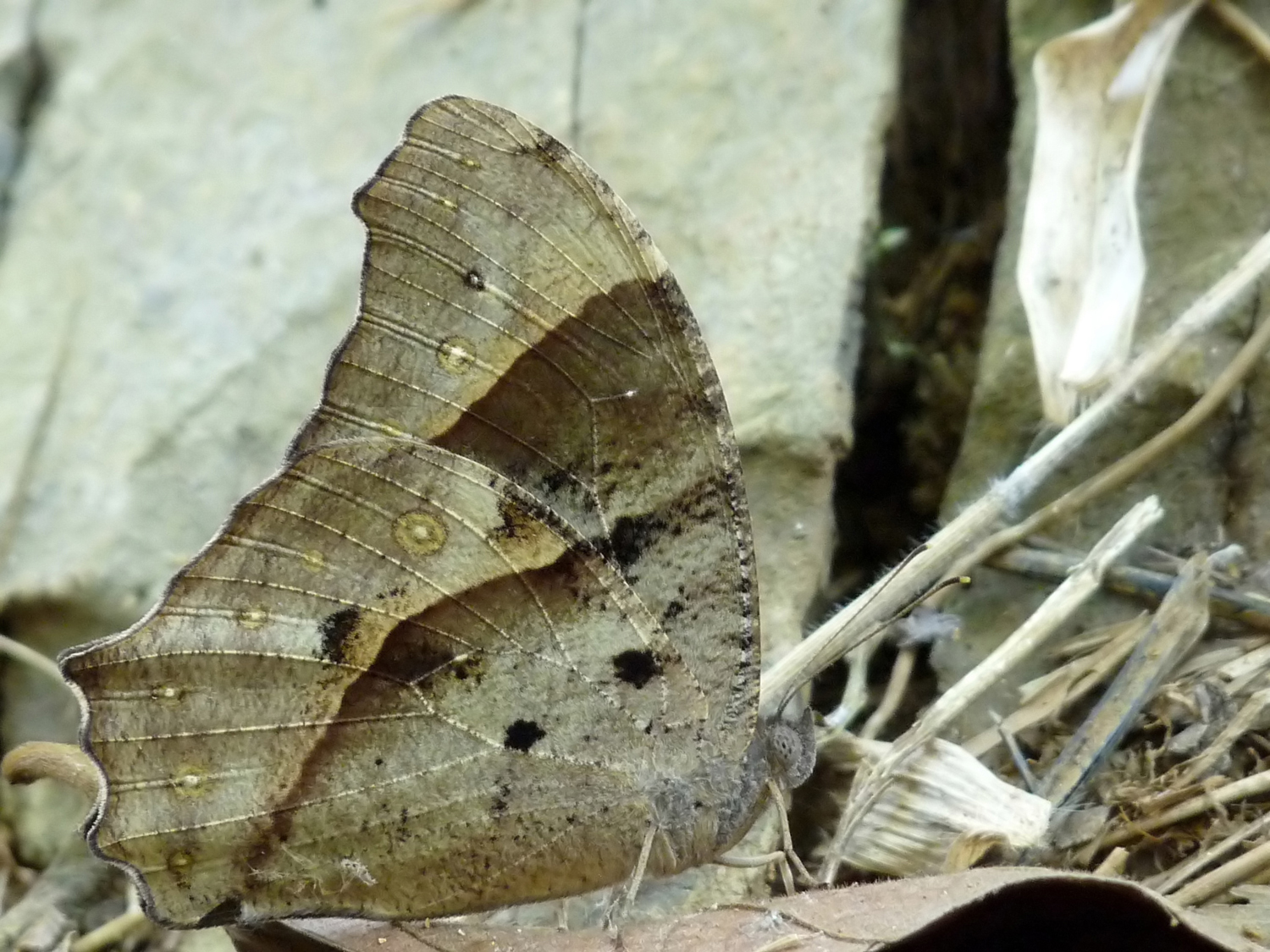
- Dry-season form

Scientific classification
- Kingdom: Animalia
- Phylum: Arthropoda
- Clade: Pancrustacea
- Class: Insecta
- Order: Lepidoptera
- Family: Nymphalidae
- Genus: Melanitis
- Species: M. leda

Binomial name
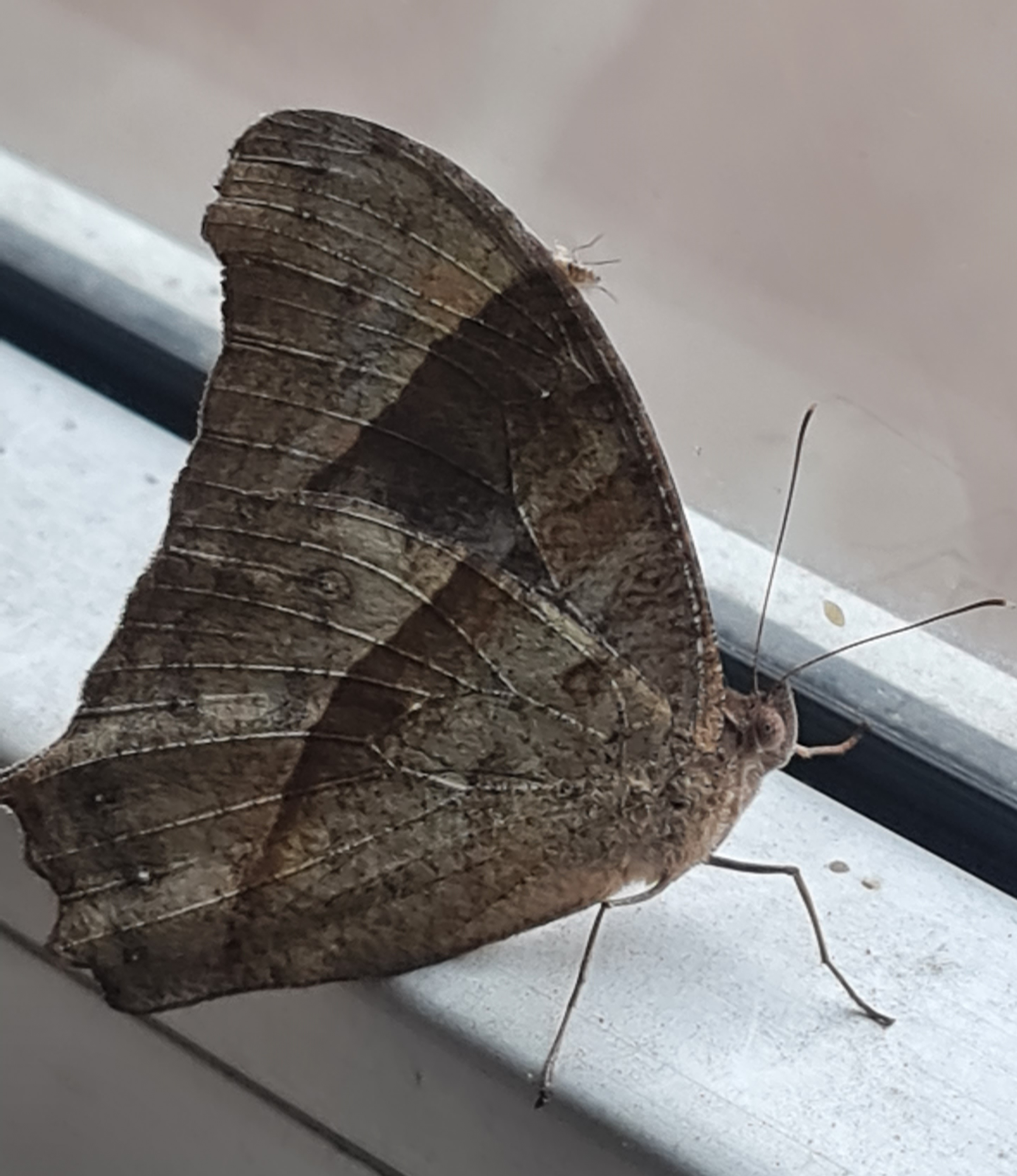
- Melanitis leda (Linnaeus, 1758) Evening Common Brown resting on a window

Synonyms
- Papilio leda Linnaeus, 1758; Papilio ismene Cramer, [1775]; Papilio solandra Fabricius, 1775; Cyllo helena Westwood, 1851; Cyllo fulvescens Guénée, 1863; Melanitis leda africana Fruhstorfer, 1908; Melanitis leda africana f. zitenides Fruhstorfer, 1908; Melanitis leda ab. plagiata Aurivillius, 1911

= Melanitis leda =

Common evening brown

Species of butterfly

Melanitis leda, the common evening brown, is a common species of butterfly found flying at dusk. The flight of this species is erratic. They are found in Africa, South Asia and South-east Asia extending to parts of Australia.

== Description ==
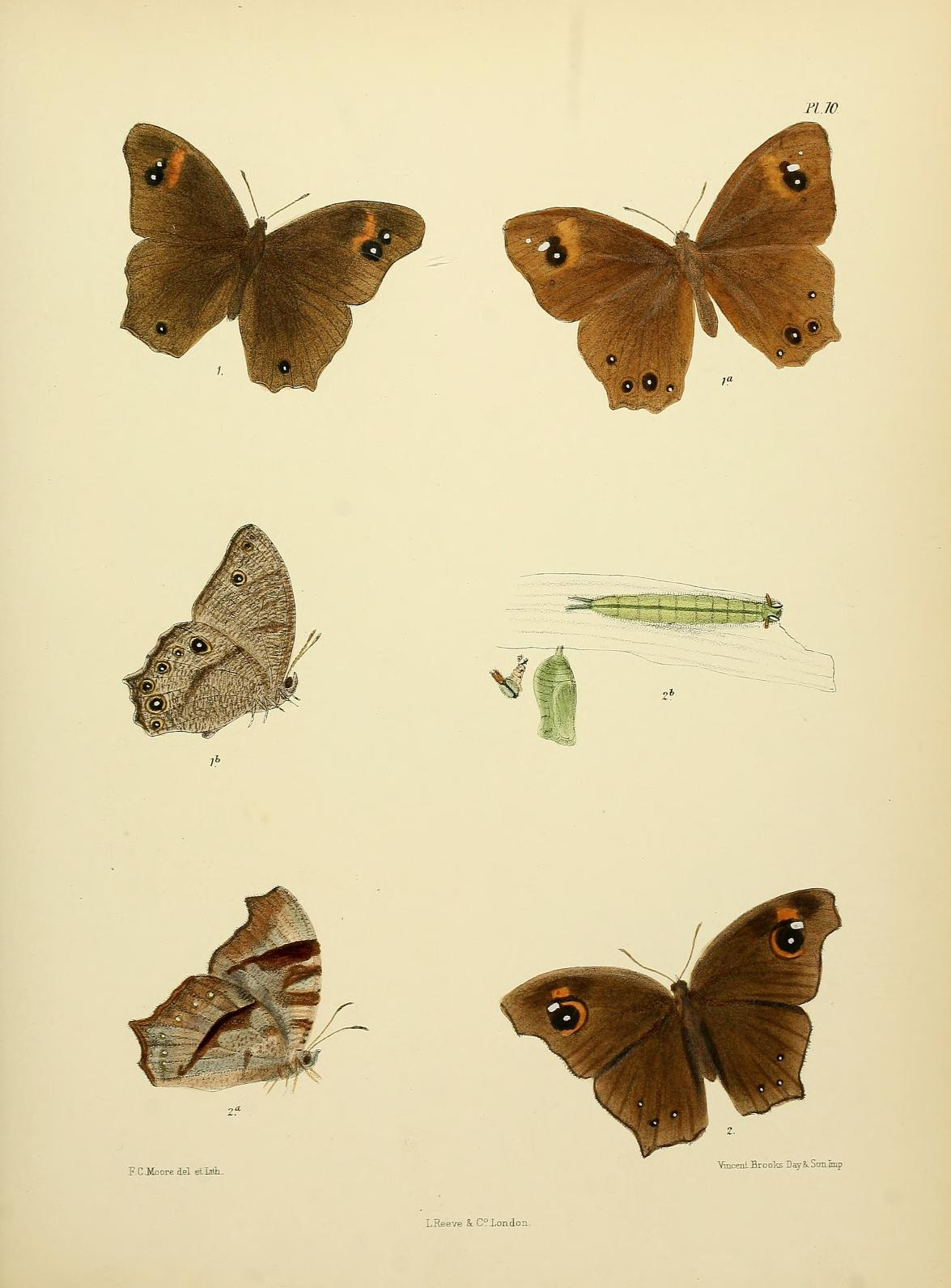
Subspecies leda (nominate) and ismene, larva and pupa

Wet-season form: Forewing: apex subacute; termen slightly angulated just below apex, or straight. Upperside brown. Forewing with two large subapical black spots, each with a smaller spot outwardly of pure white inwardly bordered by a ferruginous interrupted lunule; costal margin narrowly pale. Hindwing with a dark, white-centred, fulvous-ringed ocellus subterminally in interspace two, and the apical ocellus, sometimes also others of the ocelli, on the underside, showing through.

Underside paler, densely covered with transverse dark brown striae; a discal curved dark brown narrow band on forewing; a post-discal similar oblique band, followed by a series of ocelli: four on the forewing, that in interspace 8 the largest; six on the hindwing, the apical and subtornal the largest.

Dry-season form: Forewing: apex obtuse and more or less falcate; termen posterior to falcation straight or sinuous. Upperside: ground colour similar to that in the wet-season form, the markings, especially the ferruginous lunules inwardly bordering the black sub-apical spots on forewing, larger, more extended below and above the black costa. Hindwing: the ocellus in interspace 2 absent, posteriorly replaced by three or four minute white subterminal spots.

Underside varies in colour greatly. Antennae, head, thorax and abdomen in both seasonal forms brown or greyish brown: the antennae annulated with white, ochraceous at apex.

Torben Larsen developed a species numbering system for his 2005 publication Butterflies of West Africa. This species is #658. The 'Larsen' number has since been used with permission in A Sharp Eye on Butterflies of Ghana, where the undersides of a range of male and female wet and dry season forms are illustrated.

== Ecology ==
Resident butterflies are known to fight off visitors to the area during dusk hours. This chase behaviour is elicited even by pebbles thrown nearby.

The caterpillars feed on a wide variety of grasses including rice (Oryza sativa), bamboos, Andropogon, Rotboellia cochinchinensis, Brachiaria mutica, Cynodon, Imperata, and millets such as Oplismenus compositus, Panicum and Eleusine indica.

Adults feed mainly on nectar, and in rare cases visit rotting fruits.

== Image gallery ==
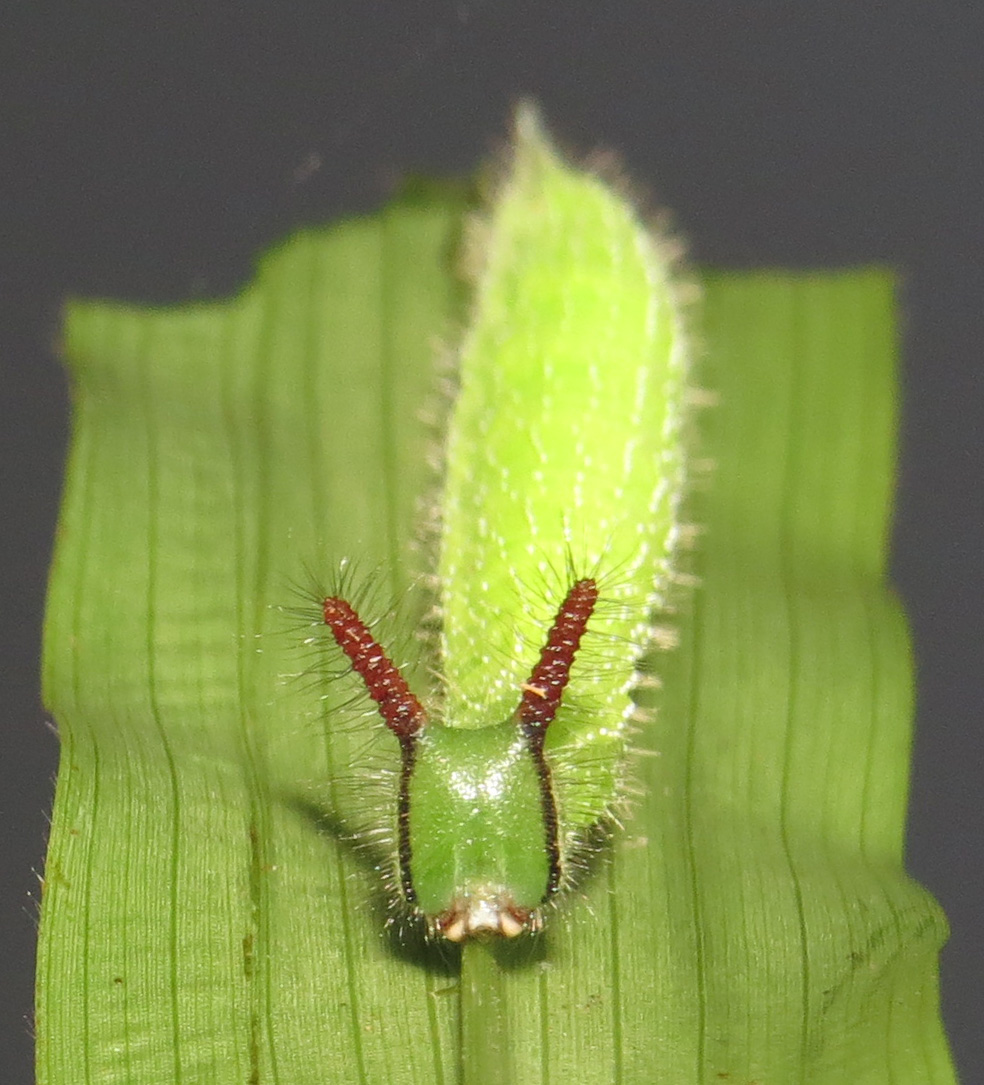
caterpillar

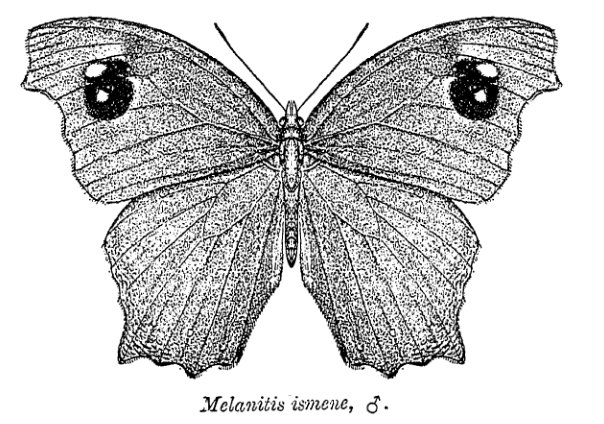
Upperside pattern

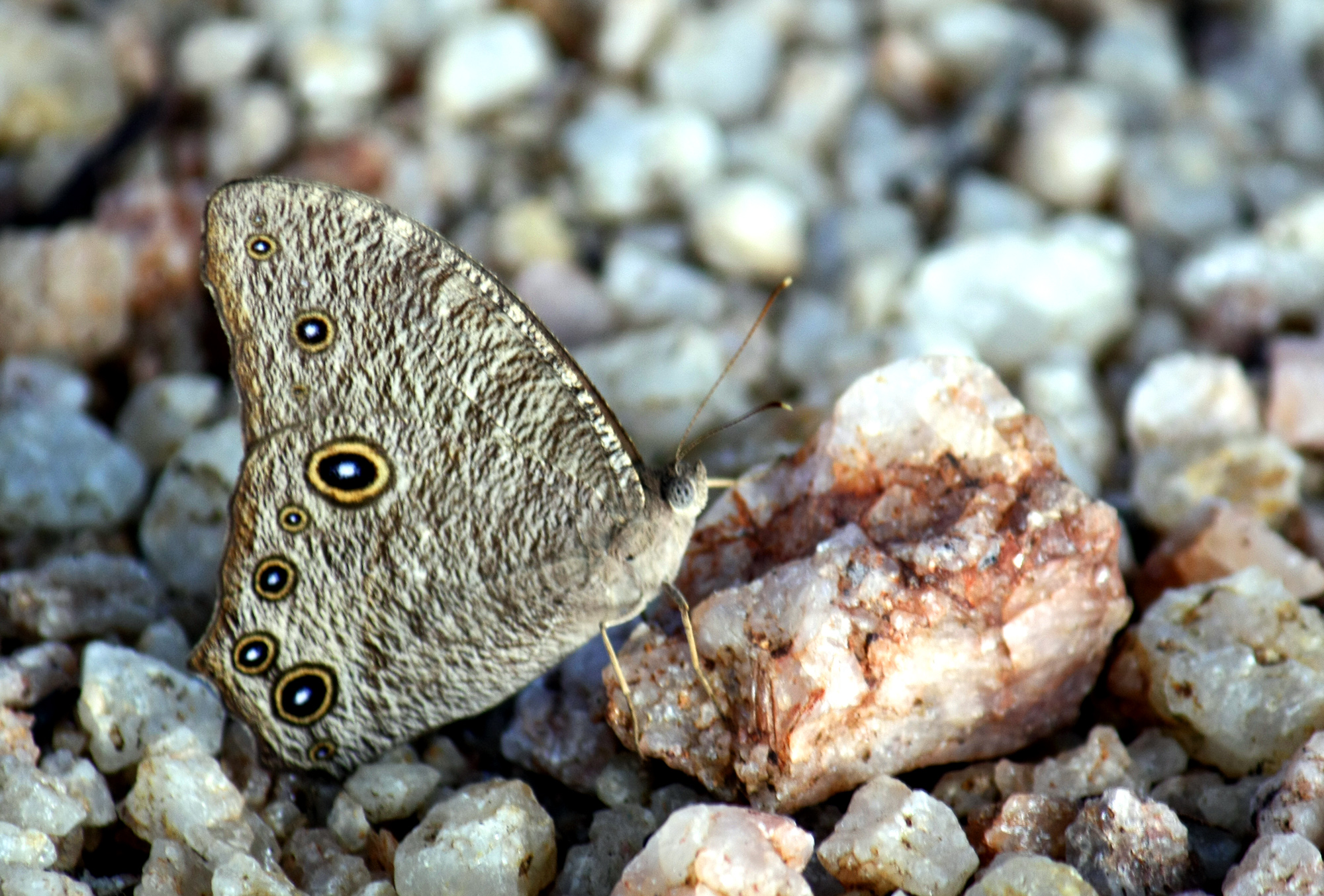
Wet season

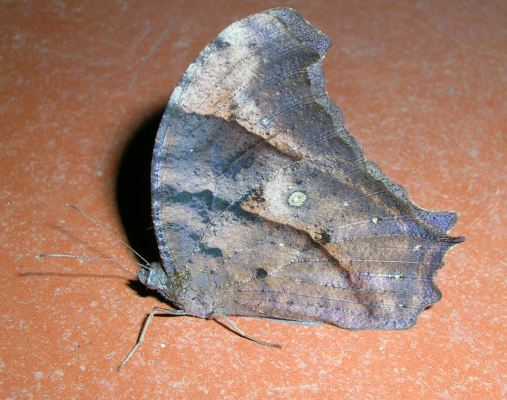
Dry season

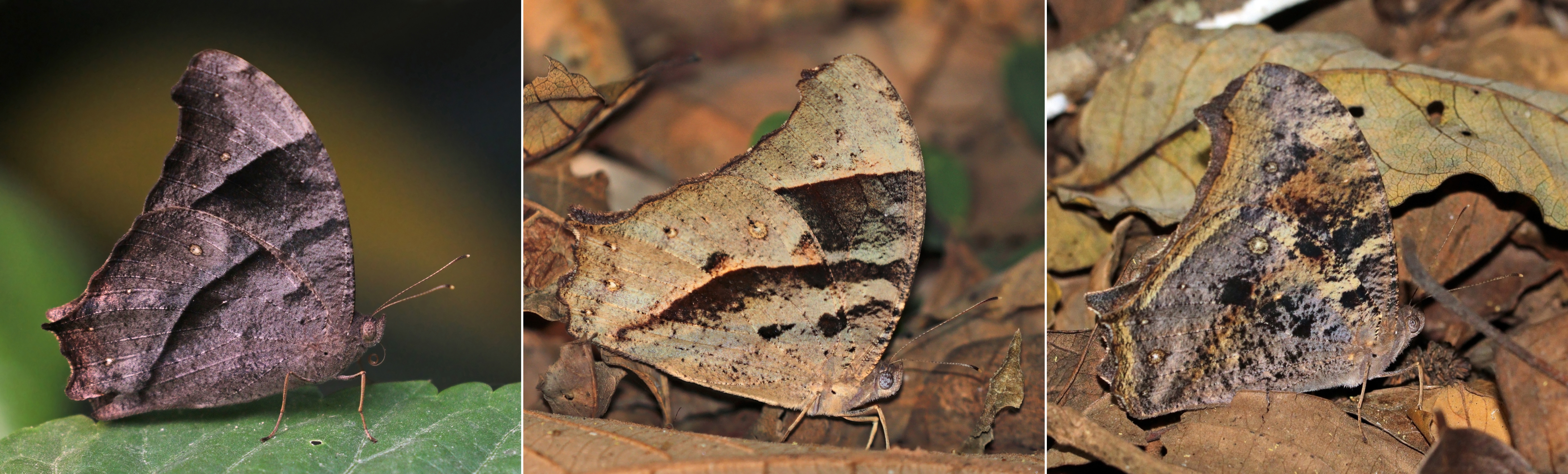
M. l. ismene dry season forms, Nepal

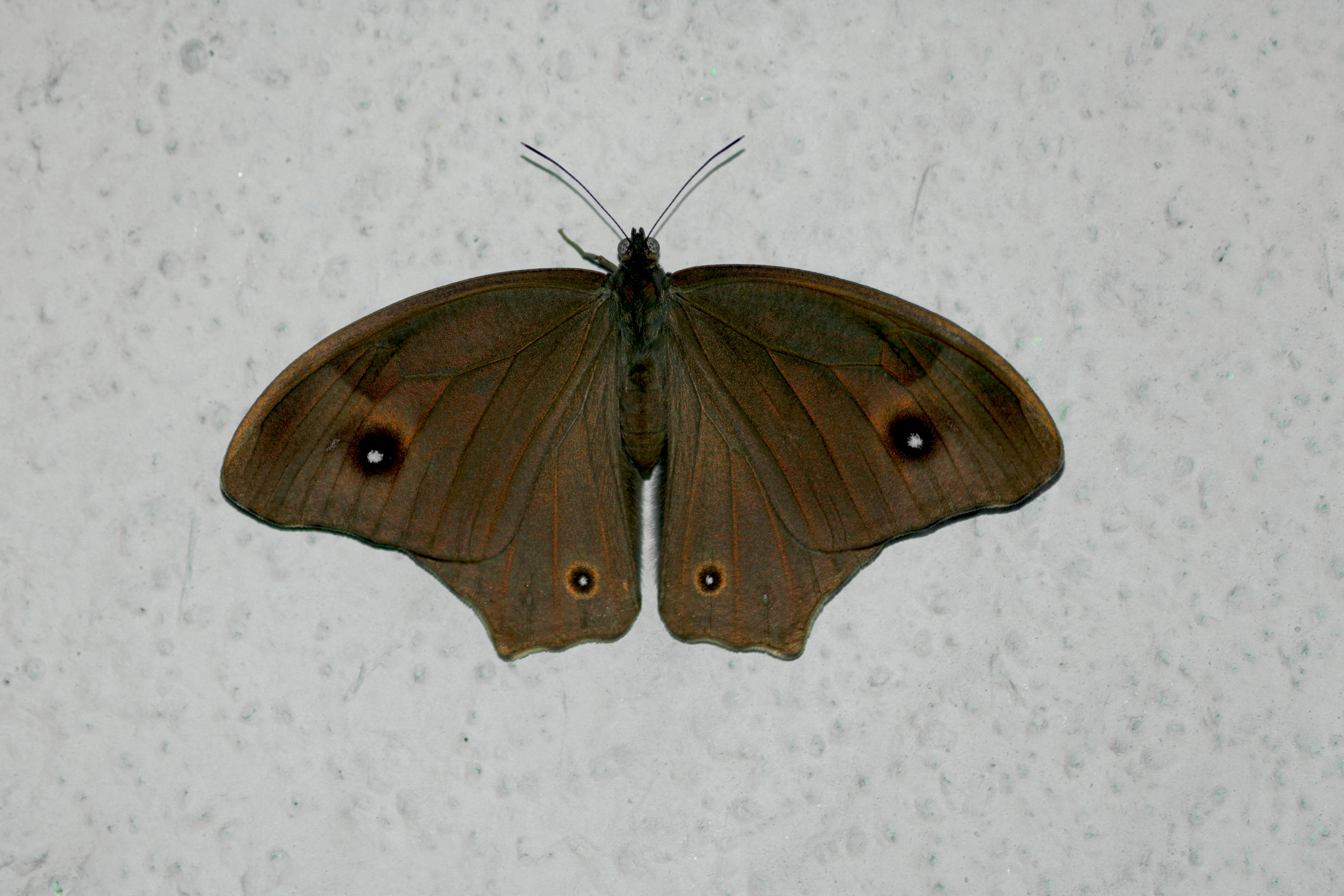
