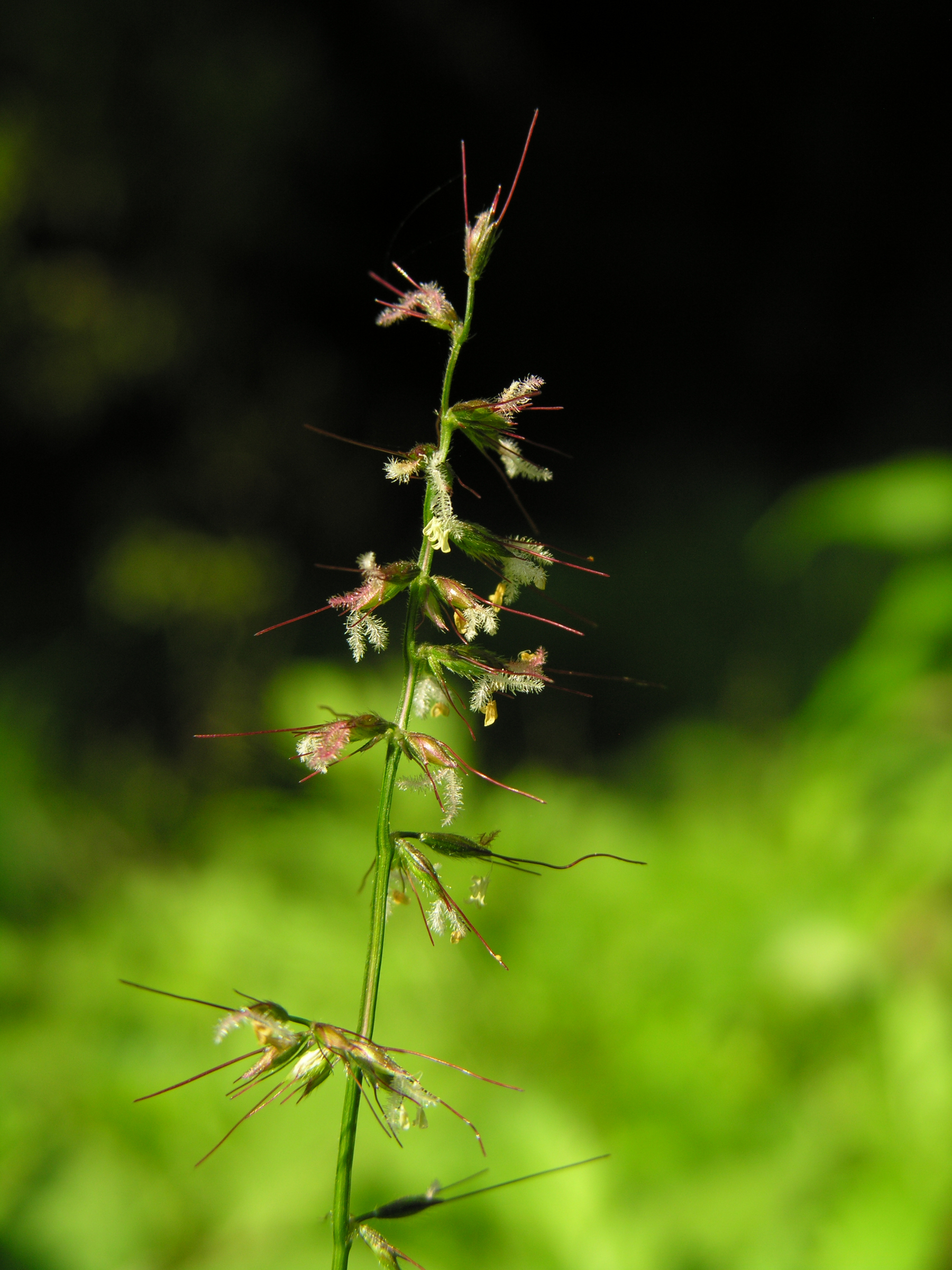
- Oplismenus undulatifolius

Scientific classification
- Kingdom: Plantae
- Clade: Tracheophytes
- Clade: Angiosperms
- Clade: Monocots
- Clade: Commelinids
- Order: Poales
- Family: Poaceae
- Subfamily: Panicoideae
- Supertribe: Panicodae
- Tribe: Paniceae
- Subtribe: Boivinellinae
- Genus: Oplismenus; P.Beauv.

Synonyms
- Hippagrostis Kuntze; Orthopogon R.Br., rejected name; Hekaterosachne Steud.; Oplismenus sect. Orthopogon (R.Br.) Schltr.; Panicum sect. Orthopogon (R.Br.) Döll; Panicum sect. Orthopogon (R.Br.) Trin.

= Oplismenus =

Genus of grasses

Oplismenus is a small genus of annual or perennial grasses, commonly known as basketgrass, found throughout the tropics, subtropics, and in some cases, temperate regions of the Americas, Africa, Asia, and Australia. The systematics of the genus are unclear; with over 100 described species, only 7 species are officially recognized as of 2016.

== Accepted species ==
The following list includes all currently recognized species of the genus Oplismenus accepted by the Catalogue of Life and World Checklist of Selected Plant Families as of March 2016, sorted alphabetically. For each, binomial name is followed by author citation.

- Oplismenus burmannii (Retz.) P.Beauv.
- Oplismenus compositus (L.) P.Beauv.
- Oplismenus flavicomus Mez
- Oplismenus fujianensis S.L.Chen & Y.X.Jin
- Oplismenus hirtellus (L.) P.Beauv.
- Oplismenus thwaitesii Hook.f.
- Oplismenus undulatifolius (Ard.) P. Beauv.

== Description ==
The members of this genus are scrambling or trailing herbaceous grasses, both annual and perennial. The stems trail along the ground and can root at the nodes. The leaf blades are generally lance-shaped or acuminate to ovate and are covered in scattered hairs, and the leaf sheaths are hairy.

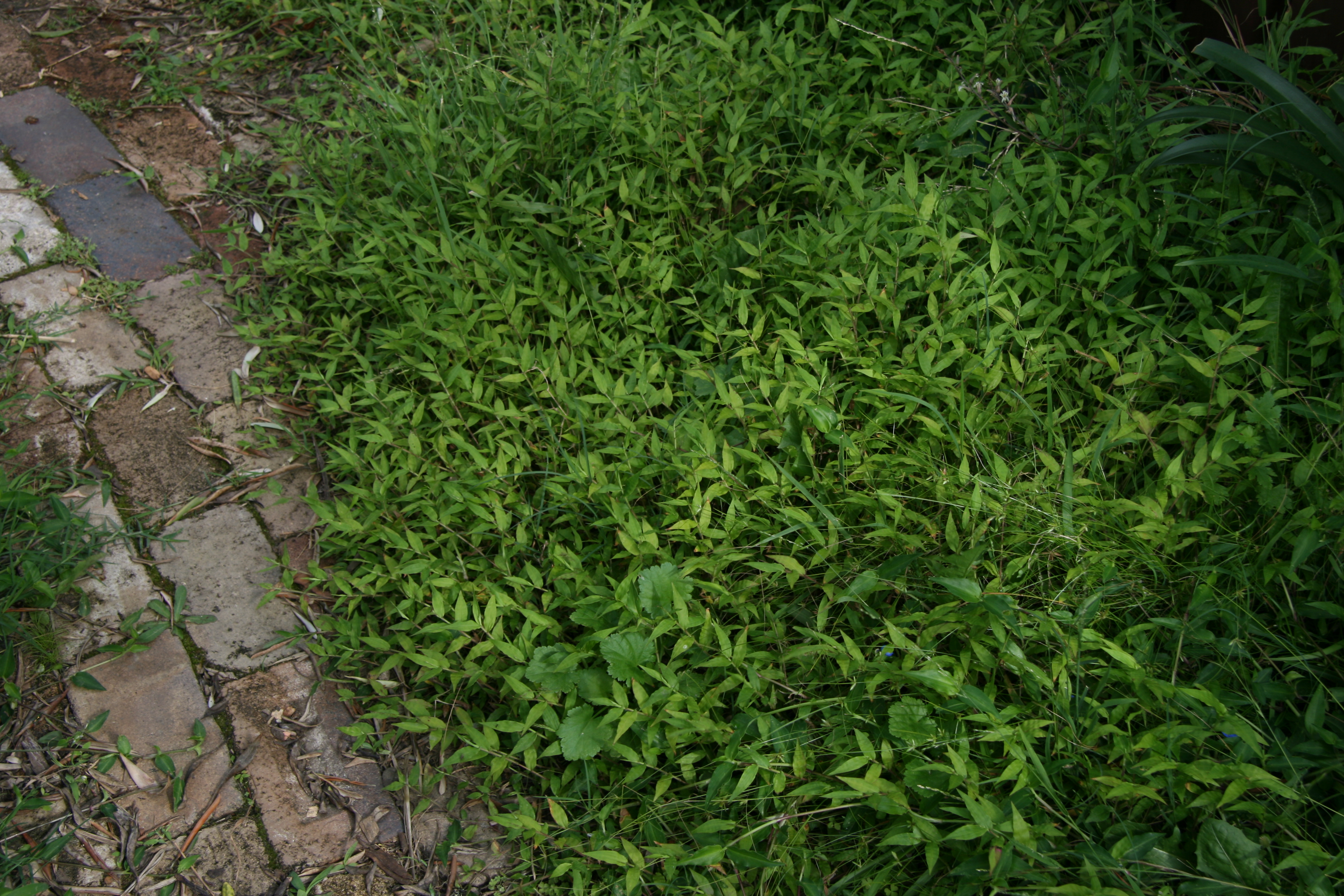
O. hirtellus growing as a groundcover, Sydney, Australia

== Ecology ==
These plants generally grow in shaded habitats such as the forest floor. Annual-type species will usually die off in cooler or drier months while the perennial species typically have much more tolerance. Some species have considerable invasive potential. Unlike some of their relatives, members of this genus use C3 photosynthesis.

== Taxonomy ==
The French naturalist Palisot de Beauvois described the genus in August or September 1810 in his Flore d'Oware et de Benin. At a later date, however, it was noted that Robert Brown had also defined the genus earlier the same year, as Orthopogon, in his work Prodromus Florae Novae Hollandiae. Nevertheless, because the name Oplismenus had been universally used for many years, it was ruled a nomen conservandum (conserved name) in 1978. The generic name is derived from the Ancient Greek hoplismenos ("armed"), because the glumes have awns.

The number of species is unclear, with some disagreement among botanists. In Australia, Oplismenus aemulus and O. imbecillis are recognised as separate species by the Queensland and New South Wales Herbaria, but not by the National Herbarium, which classifies them as synonyms of O. hirtellus.

A multiple discriminant analysis published in 1978 of the characteristics used to define the species of Oplismenus worldwide found a high degree of overlap in Australia, indicating O. aemulus and O. imbecilis fell within the parameters of O. hirtellus, as did the American taxon O. setarius. The other American taxon, O. rariflorus, fell within O. compositus. The authors proposed the recognition of only five species:

- Oplismenus burmannii - pantropical
- Oplismenus thwaitesii - Sri Lanka (may be synonymous with O. burmannii)
- Oplismenus compositus - Americas, Africa, Asia, Australia, Pacific
- Oplismenus hirtellus - tropics, but replaced in India and Indochina by O. compositus
- Oplismenus undulatifolius - widespread

The German botanist Ursula Scholz published a monograph in 1981, having studied the genus throughout the world and examined over five thousand specimens, including 61 type specimens. She recognized nine species and 18 infraspecific taxa.

- Section Scabriseta
  - O. affinis Schult.
    - O. affinis var. affinis
    - O. affinis var. humboldtianus
  - O. baronii
  - O. burmannii
    - O. burmannii var. burmannii
    - O. burmannii var. lanatus
    - O. burmannii var. multisetus
  - O. flavicomus
  - O. gracillimus
  - O. humbertianus

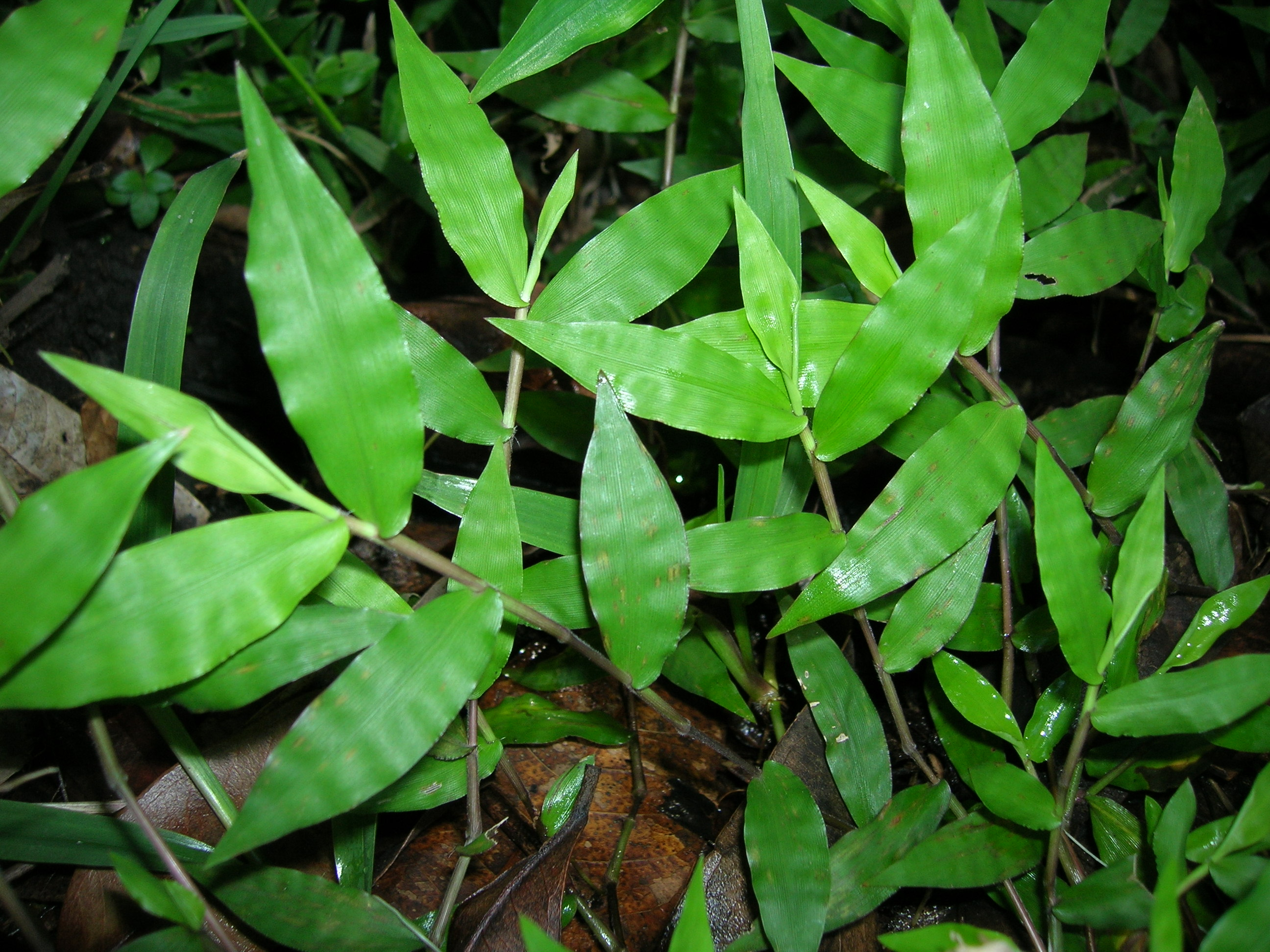
Oplismenus hirtellus

- Section Oplismenus
  - O. aemulus
    - O. aemulus var. aemulus
    - O. aemulus var. flaccidus
    - O. aemulus var. densiflorus
  - O. compositus
    - O. compositus var. compositus
    - O. compositus var. rariflorus
    - O. compositus var. sylvaticus
  - O. hirtellus
    - O. hirtellus subsp. hirtellus
    - O. hirtellus subsp. acuminatus
    - O. hirtellus subsp. capensis
    - O. hirtellus subsp. fasciculatus
    - O. hirtellus subsp. imbecillis
    - O. hirtellus subsp. japonicus
    - O. hirtellus subsp. microphyllus
    - O. hirtellus subsp. psilostachys
    - O. hirtellus subsp. setarius
    - O. hirtellus subsp. tsushimensis
    - O. hirtellus subsp. undulatifolius

== Uses ==
Variegated forms have been cultivated as house plants in Europe. Locally occurring species in Australia have been used for revegetation and reclamation in shady or wet areas, though some can be invasive. Some have been promoted as local native plants for wildlife gardens, and as lawn grass. They are edible to livestock.
