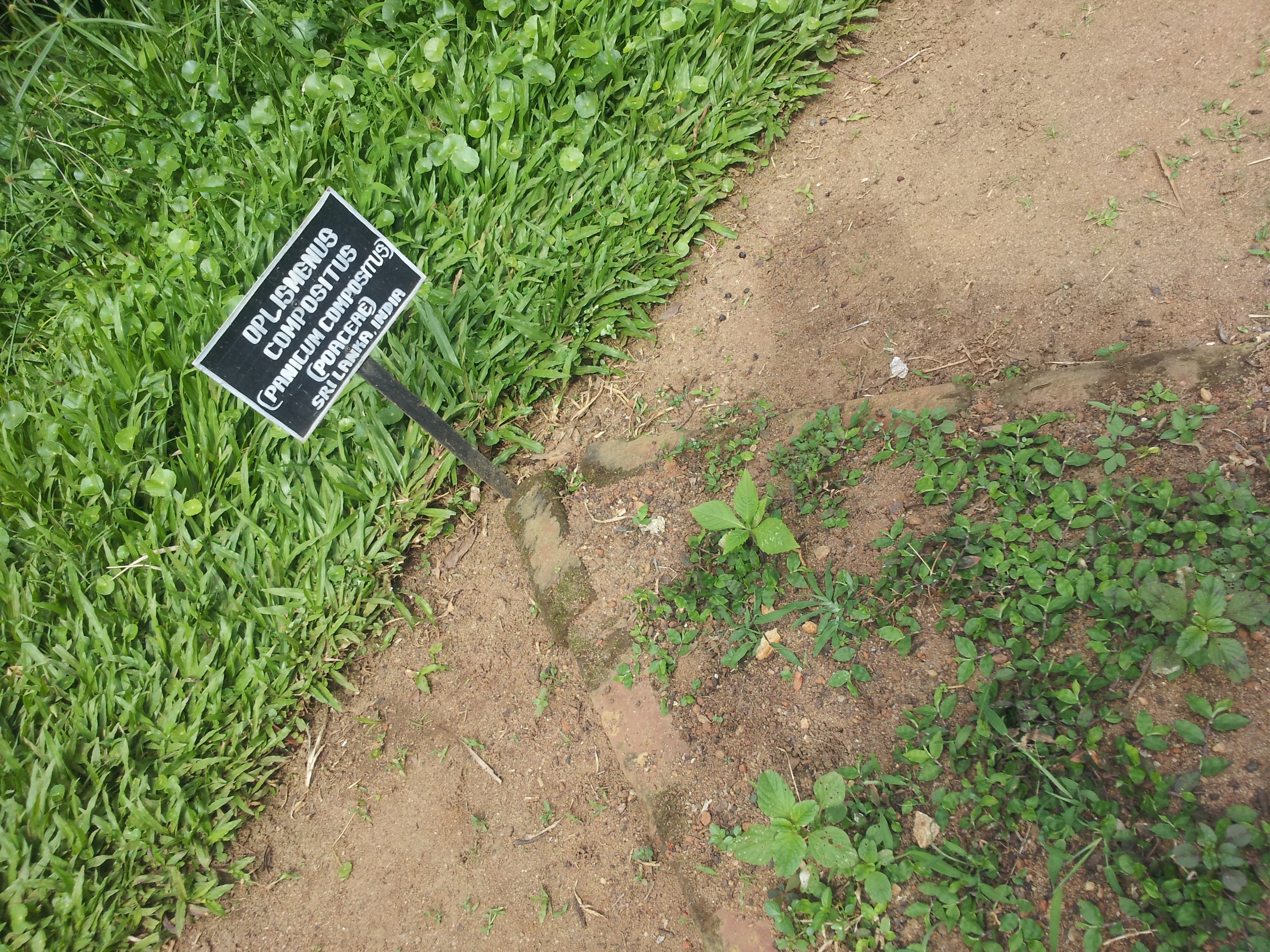

Scientific classification
- Kingdom: Plantae
- Clade: Tracheophytes
- Clade: Angiosperms
- Clade: Monocots
- Clade: Commelinids
- Order: Poales
- Family: Poaceae
- Subfamily: Panicoideae
- Genus: Oplismenus
- Species: O. compositus

Binomial name
- Oplismenus compositus (L.) P. Beauv.

Synonyms
- Echinochloa lanceolata (Retz.) Roem. & Schult.; Oplismenus decompositus Nees; Oplismenus elatior (Linn. f.) P. Beauv.; Oplismenus lanceolatus (Retz.) Kunth; Oplismenus pratensis (Spreng.) Schult.; Oplismenus sylvaticus (Lam.) Roem. & Schult.; Orthopogon compositus (Linn.) R. Br.; Orthopogon pratensis Spreng.; Panicum certificandum Steud.; Panicum compositum Linn.; Panicum elatius Linn. f.; Panicum lanceolatum Retz.; Panicum peninsulanum Steud.; Panicum sylvaticum Lam.

= Oplismenus compositus =

Species of flowering plant

Oplismenus compositus, the running mountaingrass, is a species of perennial plant from the family Poaceae that can be found throughout Asia (Pakistan China), Africa, Australia, South America, Mexico and Hawaii.

== Description ==
The plant is 15–150 centimetres (5.9–59.1 in) long. The leaves are lanceolate, ovate, are 2–16 centimetres (0.79–6.30 in) long and 8–35 millimetres (0.31–1.38 in) wide. It leaf blades are venated and have obscure cross veins with an apex which is acuminate or slightly acute. O. compositus have a raceme which is composed from inflorescence. It is borne on a side of central axis, is unilateral and is 2.5–11 centimetres (0.98–4.33 in) long. The central inflorescence axis 5–25 centimetres (2.0–9.8 in) long with angular rachis and is either glabrous or pilose on the bottom. Spikelets come in 2 rows which are fertile, pedicelled, and sessile. The pedicels are oblong. The spikelets also have one basal sterile florets and one fertile florets while its rhachilla is not extended. They are 2.5–4 millimetres (0.098–0.157 in) in length and are lanceolate.

The glume is shorter than a spikelet and thinner than fertile lemma. It lower glume is ovate with its awn being 3–10 millimetres (0.12–0.39 in) in length. The upper glume is also ovate, but unlike the lower, is also herbaceous with glabrous surface which can be pubescent as well. It is also obtuse and is 0–4 millimetres (0.00–0.16 in) in length. Florets are 2–2.5 millimetres (0.079–0.098 in) in length and are pubescent, emarginate, and mucronate as well. Both florets and glumes are 1-keeled, but the veins are different; Glumes are 5 while florets are 7–11. The fruit is linear and is 0.5 millimetres (0.020 in) in length.
