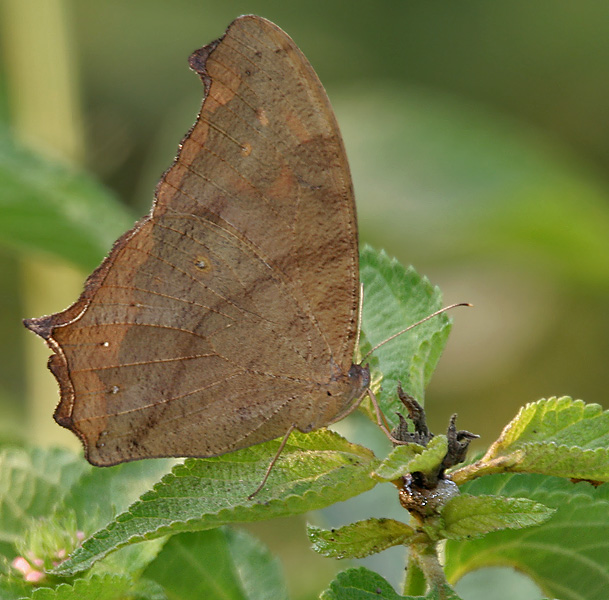
- Melanitis leda

Scientific classification
- Domain: Eukaryota
- Kingdom: Animalia
- Phylum: Arthropoda
- Class: Insecta
- Order: Lepidoptera
- Family: Nymphalidae
- Tribe: Melanitini
- Genus: Melanitis; Fabricius, 1807

Diversity
- 12 species

Synonyms
- Hipio Hübner, 1819; Cyllo Boisduval, 1832

= Melanitis =

Genus of butterflies

Melanitis is a genus of butterflies from the subfamily Satyrinae in the family Nymphalidae.

== Species ==
- Melanitis amabilis (Boisduval, 1832)
- Melanitis ansorgei Rothschild, 1904 – blue evening brown
- Melanitis atrax C. & R. Felder, 1863
- Melanitis belinda Grose-Smith, 1895
- Melanitis boisduvalia C. & R. Felder, 1863
- Melanitis constantia (Cramer, [1777])
- Melanitis leda (Linnaeus, 1758) – common evening brown
- Melanitis libya Distant, 1882 – violet-eyed evening brown
- Melanitis phedima (Cramer, [1780]) – dark evening brown
- Melanitis pyrrha Röber, 1887
- Melanitis velutina (C. & R. Felder, [1867])
- Melanitis zitenius (Herbst, 1796) – great evening brown
