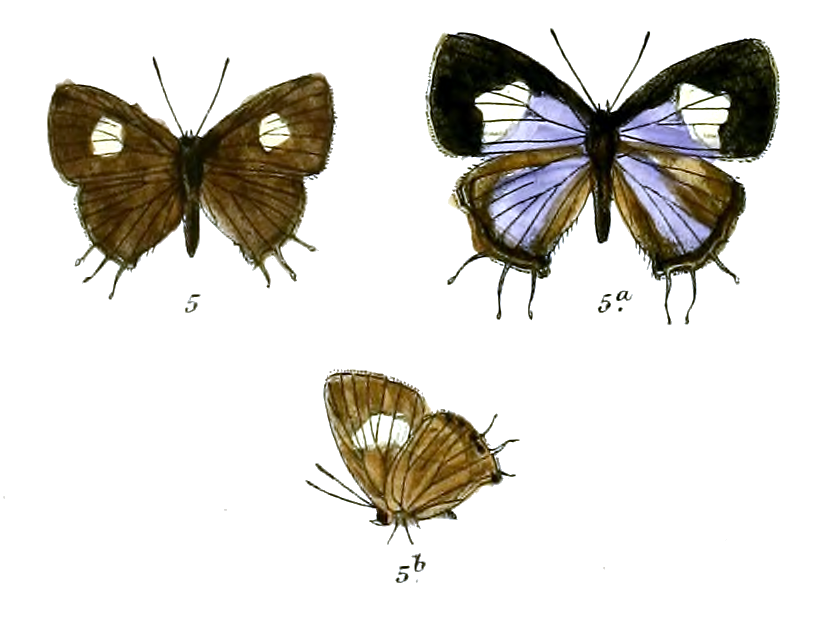

Scientific classification
- Kingdom: Animalia
- Phylum: Arthropoda
- Class: Insecta
- Order: Lepidoptera
- Family: Lycaenidae
- Genus: Horaga
- Species: H. viola

Binomial name
- Horaga viola Moore, 1883

= Horaga viola =

Brown onyx

Species of butterfly

Horaga viola, the brown onyx, a small lycaenid or hairstreak butterfly found in Asia.(Sikkim, Assam, India, Ceylon, Burma) It is sometimes treated as a subspecies of Horaga albimacula,

== Description ==
Male. Upperside blackish-brown with a slight violet tint. Forewing with a somewhat oval white patch outside the cell, varying in size in different examples. Hindwing without markings, tails black, tipped with white, outer marginal line of both wings finely black. Undersider paler with a stronger violet tint. Forewing with the white patch continued to the hinder margin somewhat constricted at the sub-median vein. Hindwing with a black anal spot, another usually (but not always) in the first interspace and some obscure blackish spots in the others. Antennae black, ringed with white; head and body above and below concolorous with the wings; no sex mark in the male. Female. Upperside dull greyish-blue. Forewing with the white patch larger than it is in the male, costal black band rather broad, widening gradually from the base to the apex, filling up the whole apical space outside the white patch and broad down the outer margin to the hinder angle. Hindwing with the costal space broadly blackish, with a small white patch on the middle of the costa, the outer margin with a narrow, more or less macular black band, marginal line finely deep black, with an inner white thread. Underside as in the male.

— Charles Swinhoe, Lepidoptera Indica. Vol. IX

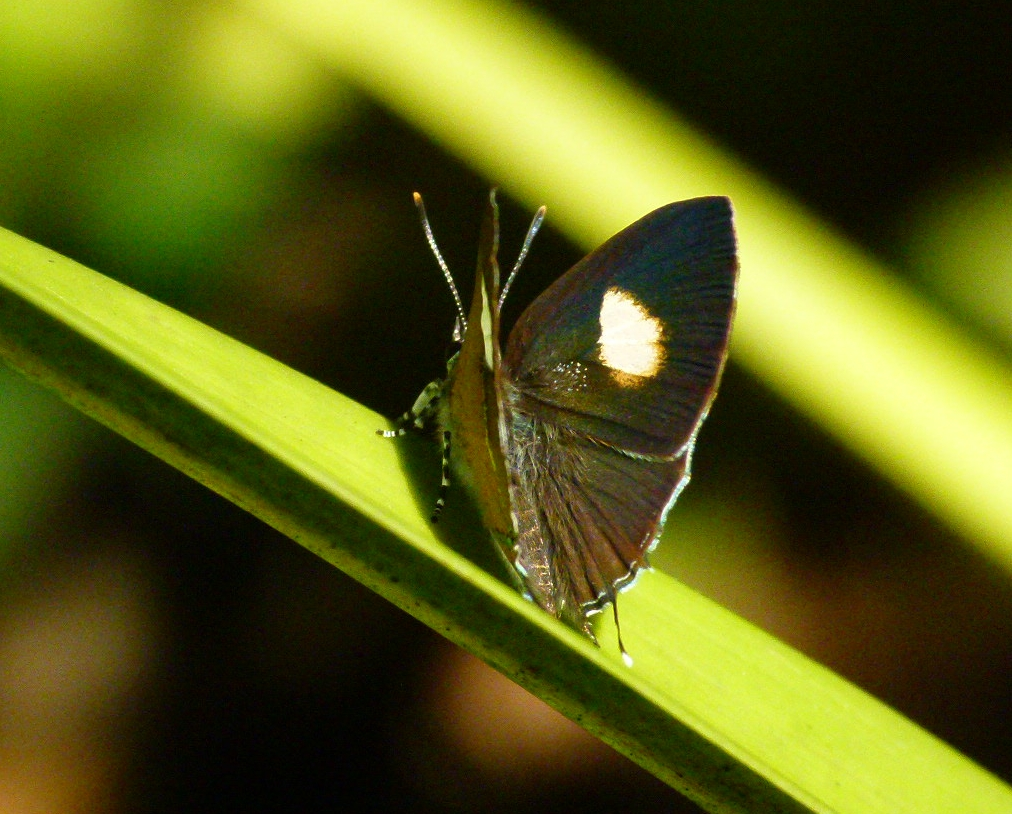
Brown onyx, Western Ghats, India

== See also ==
- List of butterflies of India
- List of butterflies of India (Lycaenidae)
