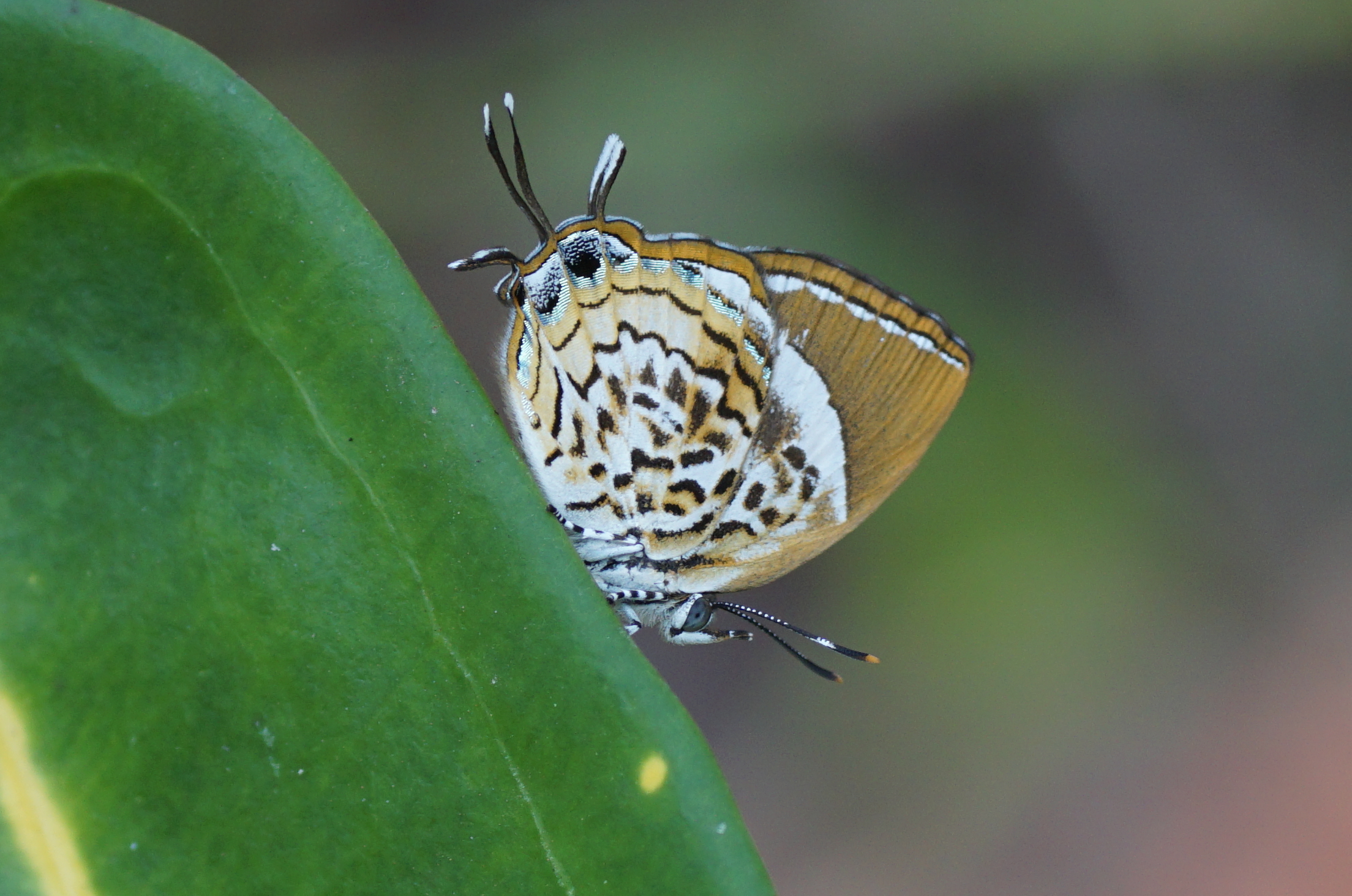

Scientific classification
- Kingdom: Animalia
- Phylum: Arthropoda
- Clade: Pancrustacea
- Class: Insecta
- Order: Lepidoptera
- Family: Lycaenidae
- Tribe: Horagini
- Genus: Rathinda; Moore, [1881]
- Species: R. amor

Binomial name
- Rathinda amor (Fabricius, 1775)

= Rathinda =

Monkey puzzle

Monotypic butterfly genus in family Lycaenidae

Rathinda is a butterfly genus in the family Lycaenidae. It consists of a single species, Rathinda amor, the monkey puzzle, found in Sri Lanka and India.

== Description ==
Male. Upperside brownish-black with a violet-tint. Forewing with a white spot (sometimes slightly ochreous) beyond the end of the cell, with two smaller spots in an outwardly oblique row from it. Hindwiag with two black lunular spots between the tails and indications of a third black spot in the next upper interspace, all three capped with orange, with a fine blue thread on their outer sides; tails black, tipped with white. Cilia blackish, with white tips. Underside white, sometimes tinged with yellow; the markings pale chocolate. Forewing with the apical third chocolate, its inner edge in an even curve from the middle of the costa to the hinder margin near the angle, containing a sub-marginal series of small black lunules inwardly edged with white; the middle portion of the white space with some chocolate suffusion, a thin linear mark near the hinder angle, two short streaks from the base followed by three or four small spots. Hindwing with a lunulated, outwardly curved discal line, the inner wing space covered with spots and small lunular marks, a sub-marginal orange-yellow band, lined on its inner side with dark chocolate, on its outer side by metallic blue-green small spots, some pale chocolate sufiusion near the apex, a black spot between the two upper tails, ringed with pale dull blue, white spots on each side of it, some white on the outside of the yellow band near the costa; both wings with a terminal, narrow, chocolate band ochreous tinted. Antennge black, ringed with white; the club with an orange tip; head and body above and below concolorous with the wings. Female, above and below like the male, but the white spots on the forewing above are larger.

— Charles Swinhoe, Lepidoptera Indica. Vol. IX

== Habitat ==
The species is endemic to South Asia, specifically India's Western Ghats, the southern Indian plains, Bangladesh, and Sri Lanka. It thrives in jungles of moderate to heavy rainfall and scrub forests below 900 m (3,000 ft). It prefers the undergrowth but can be seen along forest paths and clearings. It can also be seen in gardens with one or more of its host plants.

== Life cycle ==
Holometabolism (complete metamorphosis)
| Egg | Larva | Pupa within chrysalis | Imago |

=== Larva ===
The caterpillars are pale green and possess fleshy, red protrusions along the back.

=== Pupa ===
The chrysalis is green and turns brown as it nears maturity. The pupa is attached to foliage by a single stalk at the tail end.

=== Imago ===
The monkey puzzle is a weak flier. It keeps low to the ground and generally does not stay airborne for long. When it lands, it tends to turn around, sidestep, and waggle its tail filaments. This may serve to confuse predators as to which end is the butterfly's head.

== Food plants ==
The butterfly feeds on soapberries, myrtles, and mangos as well as plants from the families Rubiaceae (Notably Ixora coccinea), Dipterocarpeae, Euphorbiaceae, and Loranthaceae.

== See also ==
- List of butterflies of India (Lycaenidae)
