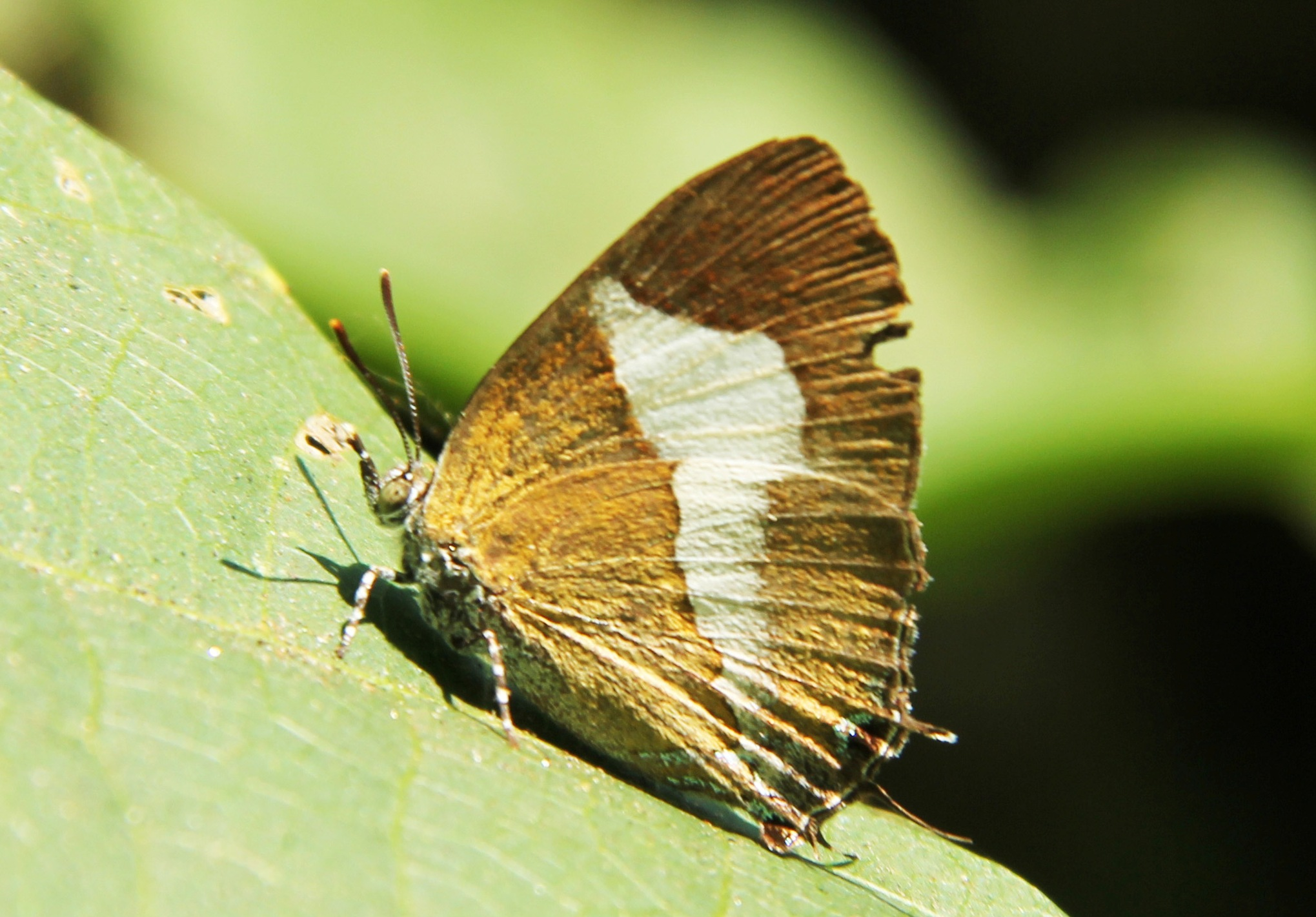
- Male
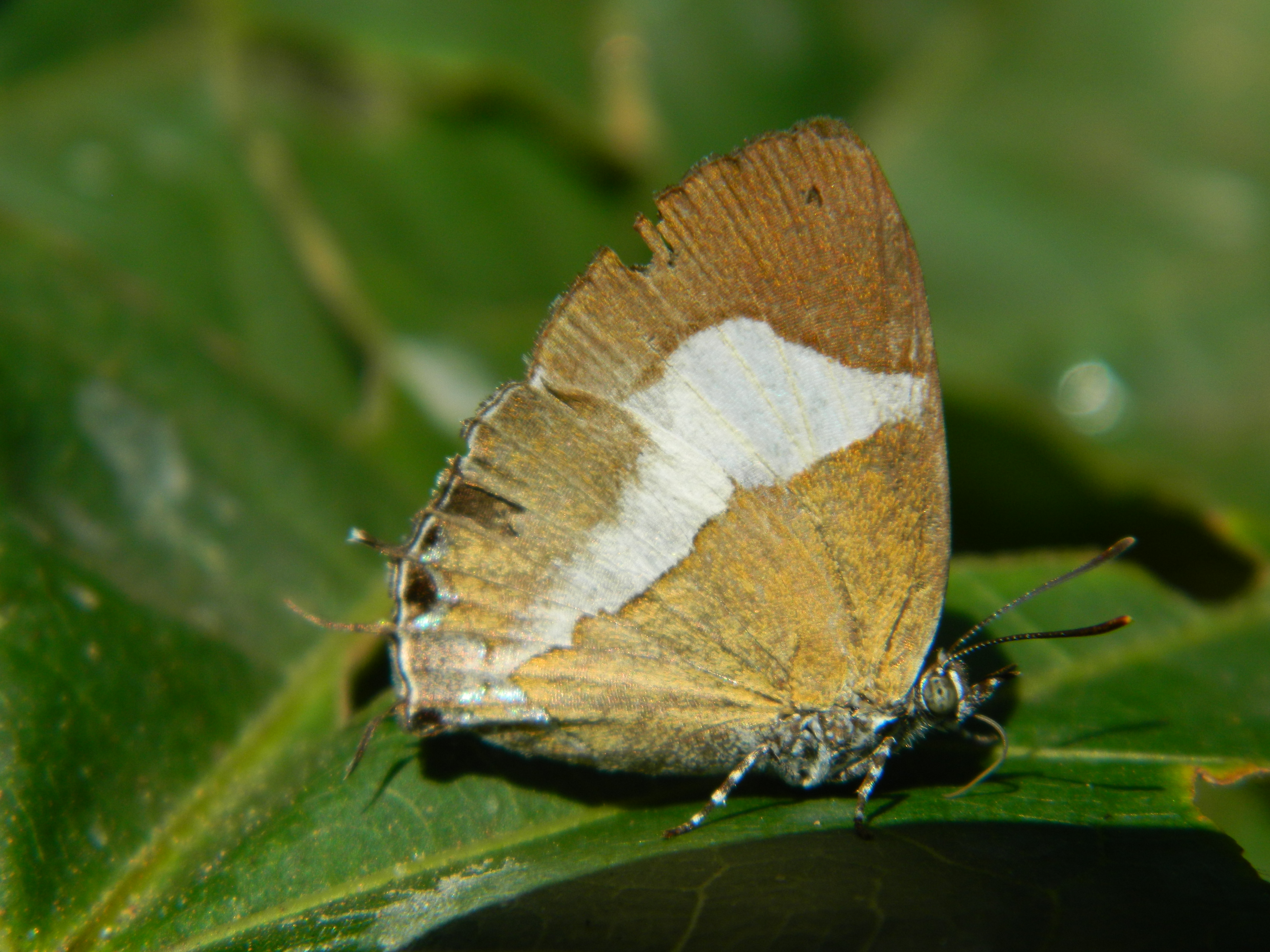
- Female

Scientific classification
- Kingdom: Animalia
- Phylum: Arthropoda
- Clade: Pancrustacea
- Class: Insecta
- Order: Lepidoptera
- Family: Lycaenidae
- Genus: Horaga
- Species: H. onyx

Binomial name
- Horaga onyx (Moore, 1857).

= Horaga onyx =

Common onyx

Species of butterfly

Horaga onyx, the common onyx, is a species of lycaenid or blue butterfly found in the Indomalayan realm.

== Range ==
The butterfly is mostly seen in India (Western Ghats, Maharashtra southwards, Himachal Pradesh to Arunachal Pradesh) and also in Nepal, Bhutan, Bangladesh, Myanmar and Sri Lanka. It is also Peninsular Malaya, Borneo, Singapore, Langkawi, Java, Sumatra, Bangka Hong Kong and the Philippines.

== Status ==
Locally common.

== Larvae food plants ==
Coriaria nepalensis (Coriariaceae).

Mangifera indica

== Description ==
Male. Upperside cyaneous-blue. Forewing with a patch of white outside the end of the cell, divided into 4 by veins 2, 3 and 4, the upper piece the smallest, the spot below vein 4 small; the costa with a black band, narrow at the base, increasing in width outwards, occupying the whole apical space beyond the white patch, and broadly down the outer margin. Hindwing with the costal area broadly blackish, a narrow macular, outer marginal black band, terminal black line, anteciliary bluish white thread; tails black, tipped with white. Cilia of both wings black, tipped with white on the hindwing and at the hinder angle of the forewing. Underside pale ferruginous-brown, with a pinkish-tint. Forewing with the hinder marginal space below the sub-median vein white, a broad white band with dark brown edges crossing the wing, from the white hinder space to near the costa, its inner edge passing just outside the end of the cell, fairly erect, somewhat sinuous, its outer margin inwardly oblique from vein 4, narrowing the upper end of the band to a point below the costa, terminal line dark brown. Hindwing with a narrower band in continuation, edged inwardly with dark brown, somewhat diffuse on its outer side, the band somewhat constricted in its middle, extending from the costa (where it is broadest) down to the first interspace, where it is angled and runs inwards in a straight black line, with some metallic blue-green spots on it; two similar spots below the angle, and three or four on the abdominal margin above the anal angle, a black anal spot, a black spot in interspaces 1 and 2, each with a metallic blue-green spot attached to it; marginal line dark brown, a white thread inside it. Cilia of both wings white, containing a medial brown line. Antennae black, ringed with white; head and body above and below concolorous with the wings, abdomen whitish beneath and at the sides. Female. Upperside paler and duller blue, the discal white patch on the forewing larger, more complete and usually oval-shaped. Underside as in the male but paler, and the white bands broader.

— Charles Swinhoe, Lepidoptera Indica. Vol. IX

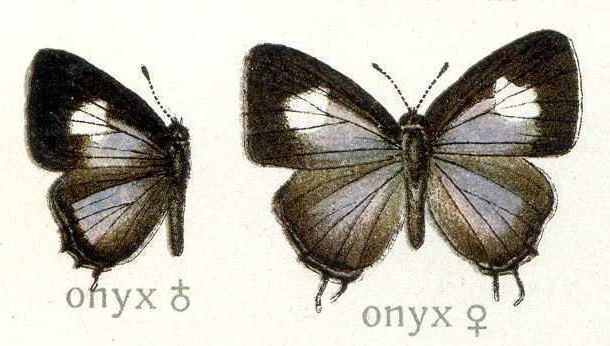
Horaga onyx onyx, male left, female right

The butterfly has a wingspan of 27 to 33 mm. Upperside: for both sexes, blue with broad black apex, termen and costa. Underside: the butterfly has dark yellowish or greenish brown with irregular and variable broad white discal band across their wings. Underside forewing: the male has a well defined brand along basal half of vein 1. Underside hindwing: well defined white band.

== Subspecies ==
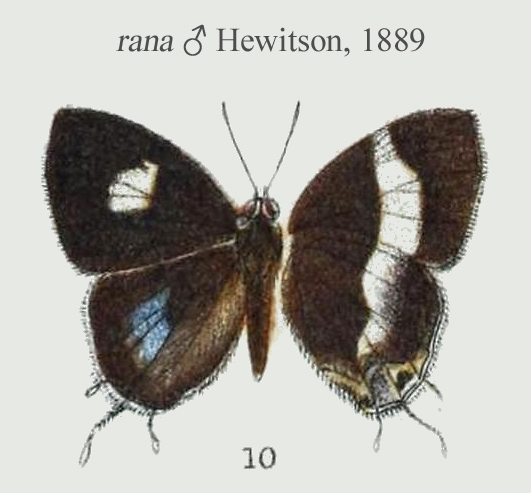
Horaga onyx rana de Nicéville, [1889] South Andaman Islands

Nine are recognized

== Habit and habitat ==
Found on thick hilly forests, never found on plains. Their flight is weak, prefers not to come out in the open, but does bask on leaves. In the north it flies up to 2,000 m on the hills when it is on the wing from March to May and in September to October.

== See also ==
- List of butterflies of India
- List of butterflies of India (Lycaenidae)
