= Arhopala hellada =

- nominate

Scientific classification
- Kingdom: Animalia
- Phylum: Arthropoda
- Clade: Pancrustacea
- Class: Insecta
- Order: Lepidoptera
- Family: Lycaenidae
- Subfamily: Theclinae
- Tribe: Arhopalini
- Genus: Arhopala
- Species: A. hellada

Binomial name
- Arhopala hellada Fruhstorfer, 1914

Synonyms
- Narathura hellada

Species of butterfly

Arhopala hellada, the long-banded oakblue, is a butterfly in the family Lycaenidae. It was first described by Hans Fruhstorfer in 1914. It is found in Sumatra and Peninsular Malaysia.

== Description ==
This species has the characteristics of Arhopala aedias and Arhopala anarte. It has a light violet blue color on the upperside. The upperside of the female is more saturated blue than that that of the male. It has long, narrow wings and a short tail. The underside resembles that of Arhopala anarte.

The butterfly has a wingspan of 30-32 mm, making it one of the biggest Arhopala butterflies.

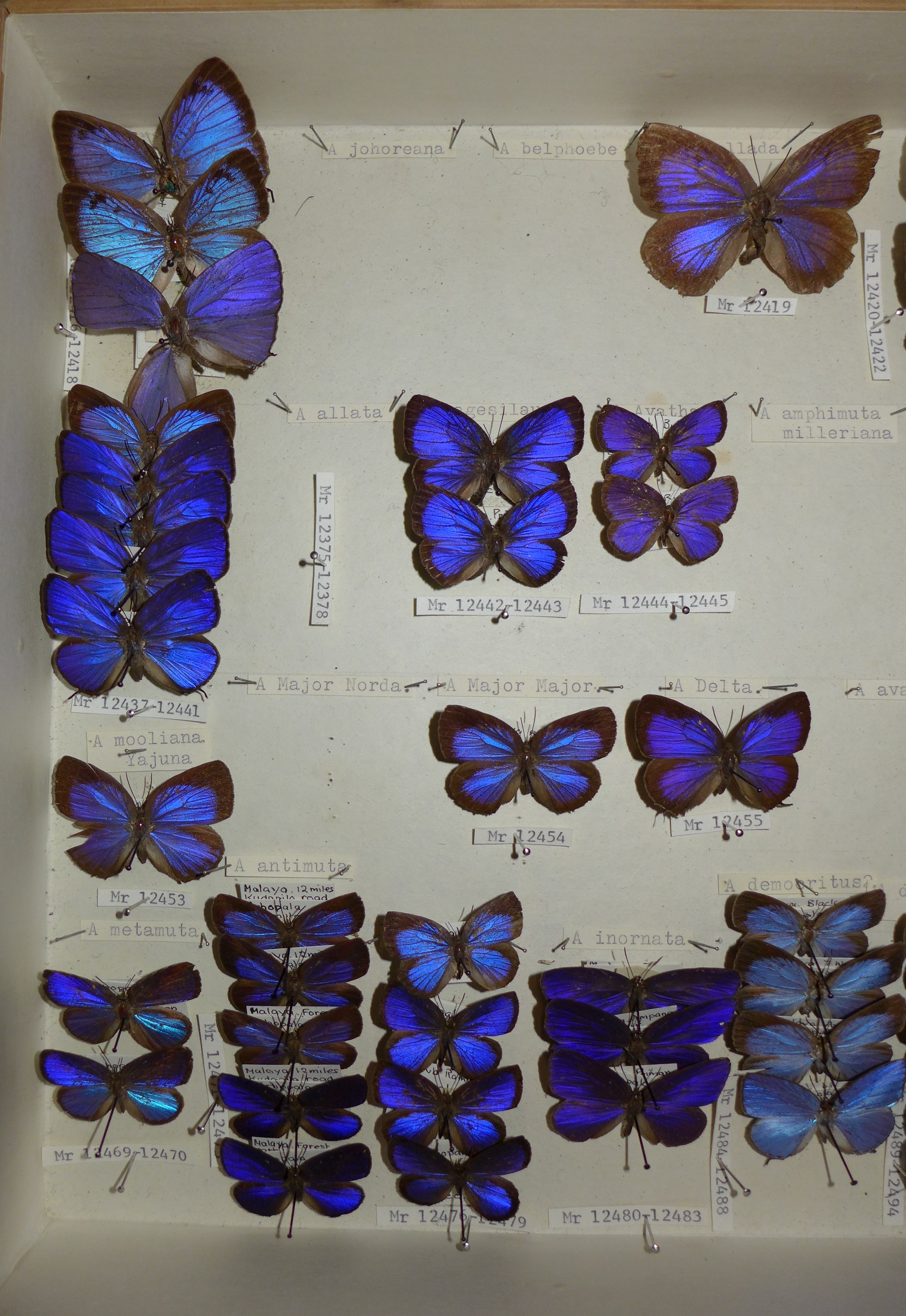
subspecies ozana (top right)

== Subspecies ==
Two subspecies are recognized -

- Arhopala hellada hellada (Fruhstorfer, 1914) - Malaya
- Arhopala hellada ozana (Fruhstorfer, 1914) - Nias (markings darker than that of hellada)
