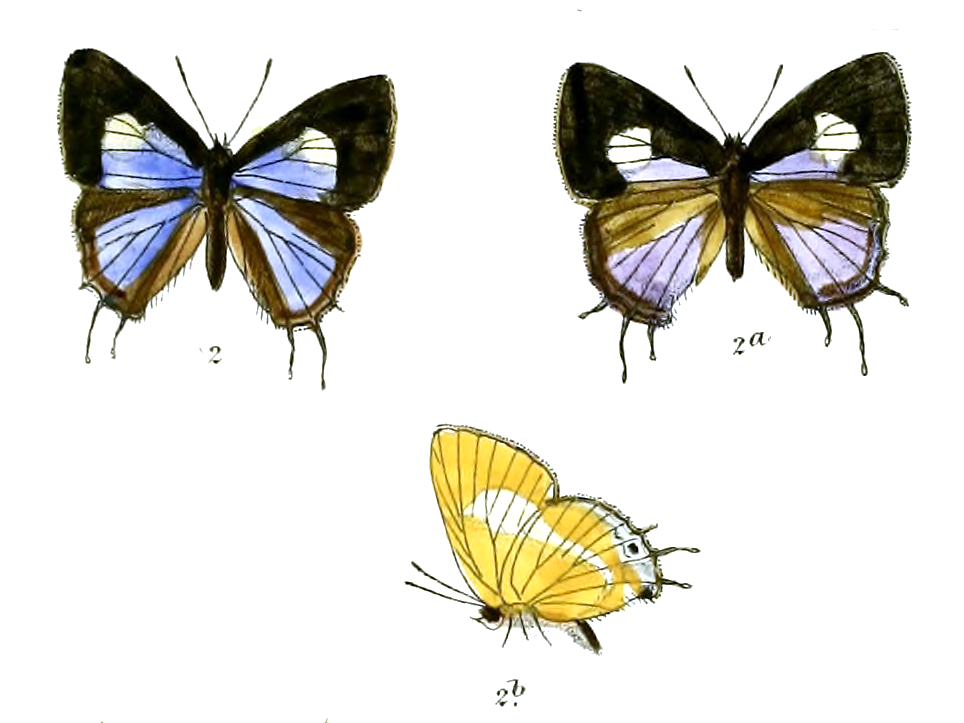

Scientific classification
- Kingdom: Animalia
- Phylum: Arthropoda
- Clade: Pancrustacea
- Class: Insecta
- Order: Lepidoptera
- Family: Lycaenidae
- Genus: Horaga
- Species: H. moulmeina

Binomial name
- Horaga moulmeina Moore, 1883

= Horaga moulmeina =

Yellow onyx

Species of butterfly

Horaga moulmeina, the yellow onyx, is a subspecies of Horaga syrinx. It is a small lycaenid (hairstreak butterfly) found in Burma. It may be a subspecies of Horaga syrinx.

== See also ==
- List of butterflies of India
- List of butterflies of India (Lycaenidae)

== Bibliography ==
- Beccaloni, George; Scoble, Malcolm; Kitching, Ian; Simonsen, Thomas; Robinson, Gaden; Pitkin, Brian; Hine, Adrian; Lyal, Chris. "The Global Lepidoptera Names Index (LepIndex)". Natural History Museum, London.
- Evans, W.H. (1932). The Identification of Indian Butterflies (2nd ed.). Mumbai, India: Bombay Natural History Society.
- "Markku Savela's website on Lepidoptera".
- Wynter-Blyth, Mark Alexander (1957). Butterflies of the Indian Region. Bombay, India: Bombay Natural History Society. ISBN 978-8170192329.
