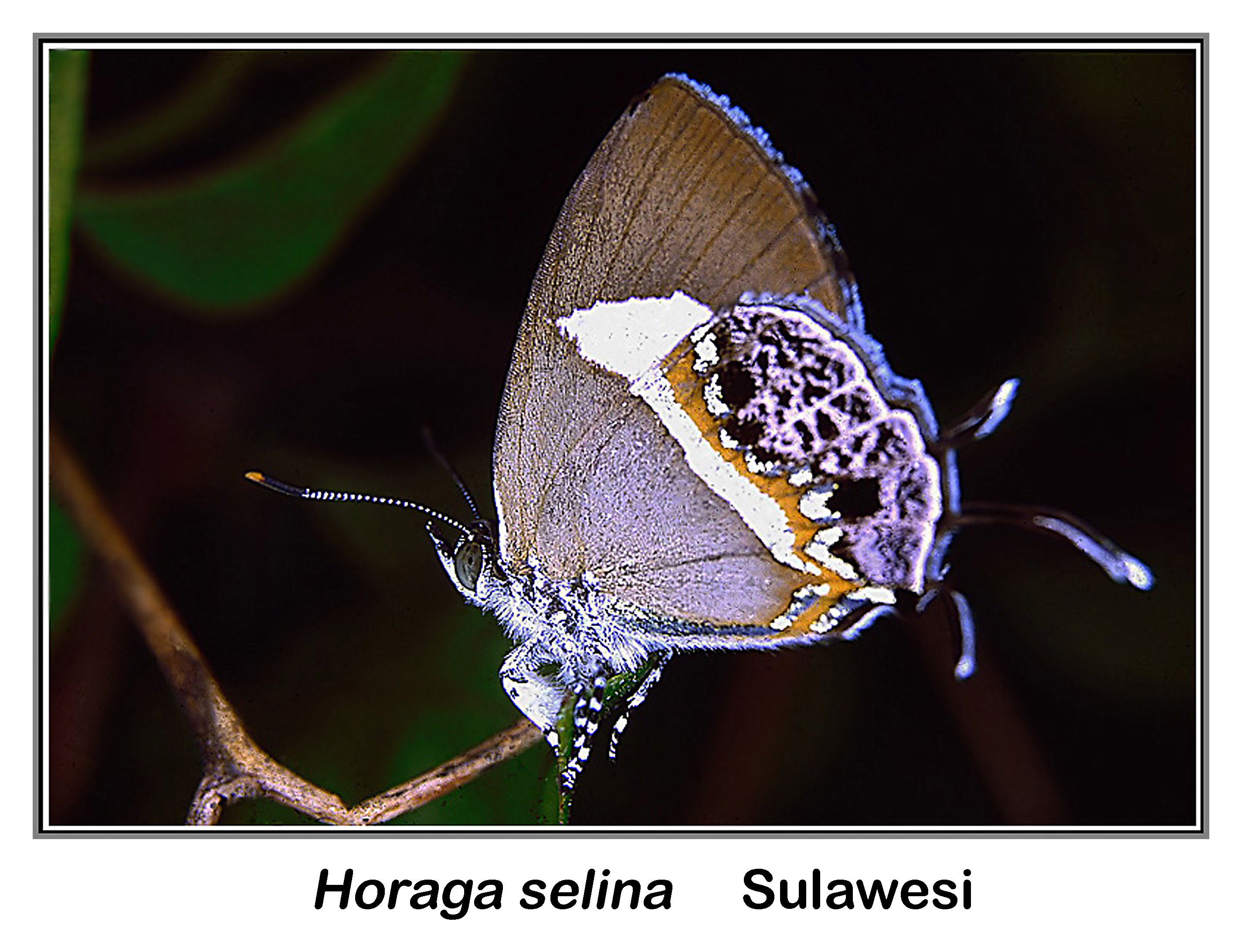

Scientific classification
- Kingdom: Animalia
- Phylum: Arthropoda
- Class: Insecta
- Order: Lepidoptera
- Family: Lycaenidae
- Subfamily: Theclinae
- Tribe: Horagini
- Genus: Horaga (Moore, 1881)

= Horaga =

Butterfly genus in family Lycaenidae

Horaga is a genus of butterflies in the family Lycaenidae which John Nevill Eliot, 1973, places in the tribe Horagini of the subfamily Theclinae. The wings are blue, purple or brown above, with broad black costal and distal margins and usually a white discal spot on the forewing. The female is dingier than the male. The underside is ochreous, or ochreous brown, with a dark postdiscal line on both wings outwardly edged with white, this edging forming a broad white band not continued much above vein 6, on the forewing, but narrower and outwardly diffuse on the hindwing. The hindwing bears filamentous tails at veins 1b, 1 and 3 and, beneath. The pattern of H. araotina is aberrant.

== Range ==
The genus occurs in Asia, where it is distributed from Sri Lanka to Taiwan, and through the Malay Archipelago to New Guinea.

== Species ==
- Horaga albimacula
- Horaga amethystus Borneo
- Horaga araotina West Malaysia, Selangor
- Horaga chalcedonyx Borneo
- Horaga moulmeina
- Horaga onyx
- Horaga selina
- Horaga syrinx
- Horaga takanamii
- Horaga viola
