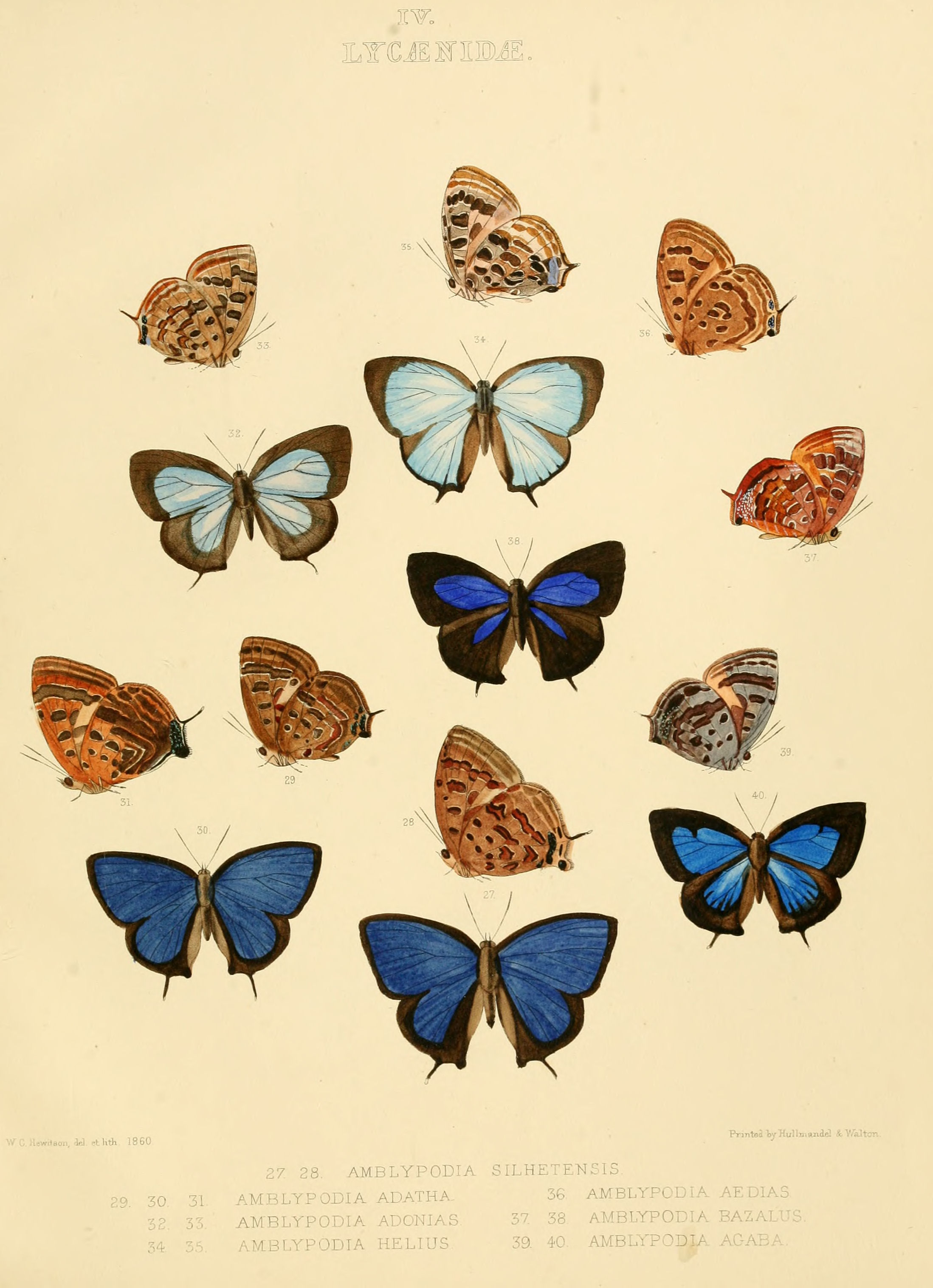
- Figure 36 in Illustrations of Diurnal Lepidoptera

Scientific classification
- Kingdom: Animalia
- Phylum: Arthropoda
- Clade: Pancrustacea
- Class: Insecta
- Order: Lepidoptera
- Family: Lycaenidae
- Genus: Arhopala
- Species: A. aedias

Binomial name
- Arhopala aedias (Hewitson, 1862)

Synonyms
- Amblypodia aedias Hewitson, 1862; Amblypodia yendava Grose-Smith, 1887; Arhopala meritatas Corbet, 1941; Arhopala agnis C. & R. Felder, [1865]; Arhopala agnis hagius Fruhstorfer, 1914; Arhopala agnis soter Fruhstorfer, 1914; Arhopala agnis sphetys Fruhstorfer, 1914; Amblypodia oenotria Hewitson, 1869

= Arhopala aedias =

Large metallic oakblue

Species of butterfly

Arhopala aedias, the large metallic oakblue, is a species of butterfly belonging to the lycaenid family described by William Chapman Hewitson in 1862. It is found in Southeast Asia (Burma, Thailand, Peninsular Malaya, Sumatra, Bangka, Nias, Borneo and the Philippines).

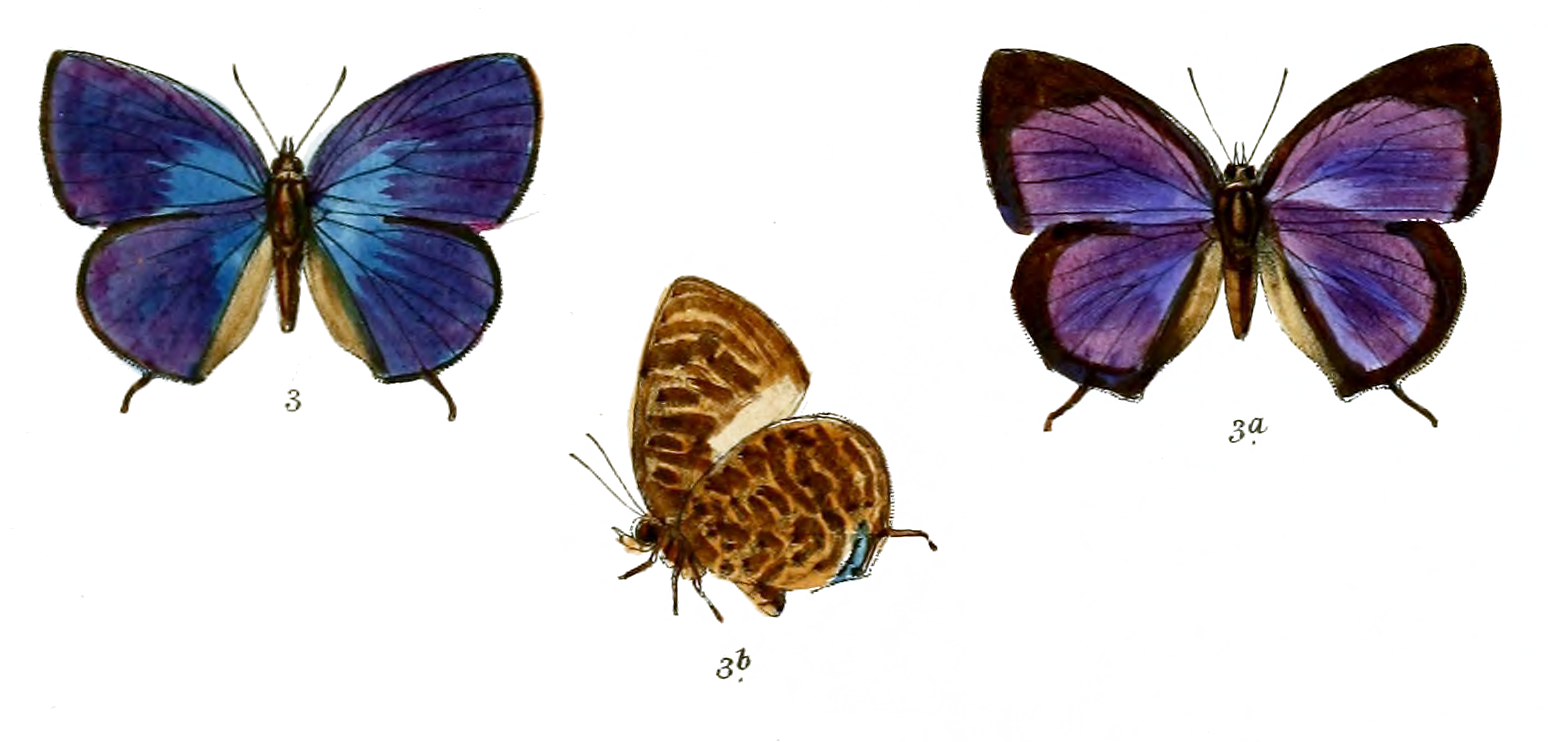
Illustration by Horace Knight in Fauna of British India

This species is in the male above magnificently lustrous light blue with a slight violet reflection; easily recognizable also by the under surface where the postmedian band of the forewing is divided into 2 oblique, almost parallel demi-bands. In the hindwing the same band is not interrupted, but very irregularly edged. The species has long tails.

== Subspecies ==
- Arhopala aedias aedias (Java)
- Arhopala aedias yendava (Grose-Smith, 1887) (Burma: Karen Hills, Yendaw Valley, Ataran)
- Arhopala aedias meritatas Corbet, 1941 (Mergui, southern Burma, Langkawi)
- Arhopala aedias agnis C. & R. Felder, [1865] (Thailand, Peninsular Malaysia, Sumatra, Bangka, Nias, Borneo) - In this [sub] species the bands beneath are only yet in some places more distinct by their edges; particularly the marginal parts of the wings are more blank. The upper surface of the male is mostly glaringly light blue, though also specimens with violet or lilac tints may occur.
- Arhopala aedias oenotria (Hewitson, 1869) (Mindanao) The male is above dull lilac without a black marginal band; the female dark brown with a violet spot across the greatest part of the forewing, but in the hindwing the violettish-blue colour only extends across the cellular area. The under surface is very irregularly marked, the postmedian band is irregular, on the forewing interrupted on the median and after this somewhat bent.
