= Horaga takanamii =

Scientific classification
- Kingdom: Animalia
- Phylum: Arthropoda
- Clade: Pancrustacea
- Class: Insecta
- Order: Lepidoptera
- Family: Lycaenidae
- Genus: Horaga
- Species: H. takanamii

Binomial name
- Horaga takanamii Seki & Saito, [2004]

Species of insect

Horaga takanami is a species of butterfly in the family Lycaenidae. The type specimen was collected in Laos. It has been found in the Siang Valley of Arunachal Pradesh.
