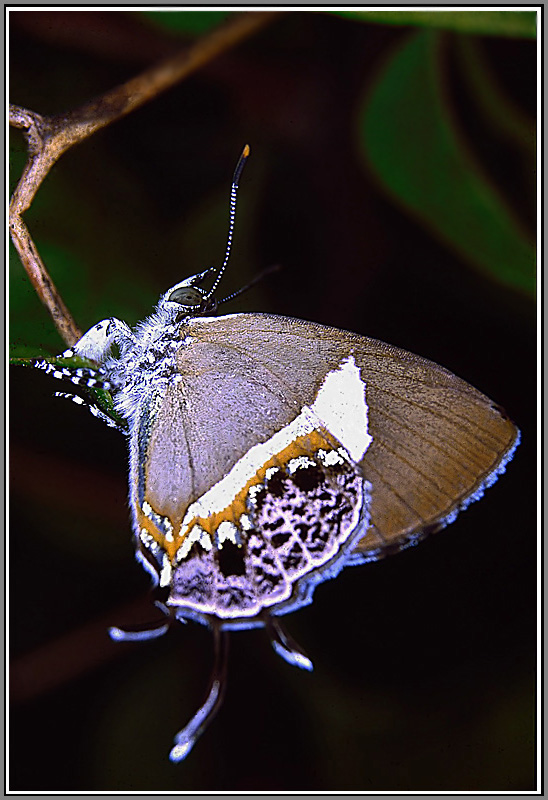
- From northern Sulawesi

Scientific classification
- Domain: Eukaryota
- Kingdom: Animalia
- Phylum: Arthropoda
- Class: Insecta
- Order: Lepidoptera
- Family: Lycaenidae
- Genus: Horaga
- Species: H. selina

Binomial name
- Horaga selina (Grose-Smith, 1895)

= Horaga selina =

Selina's onyx

Species of butterfly

Horaga selina, the Selina's onyx, is a species of lycaenid or hairstreak butterfly found in Sulawesi, Indonesia.

== Range ==
H. selina is endemic to Sulawesi. It was first found in the central region and was known until 1985 from only a single holotype specimen. It has since been found in the southern region and also in the Bogani Nani Wartabone National Park, northern Sulawesi, during the Royal Entomological Society's 1985 Project Wallace expedition.

== See also ==
- List of butterflies of India
- List of butterflies of India (Lycaenidae)
