= Crematogaster rothneyi =

Scientific classification
- Kingdom: Animalia
- Phylum: Arthropoda
- Clade: Pancrustacea
- Class: Insecta
- Order: Hymenoptera
- Family: Formicidae
- Subfamily: Myrmicinae
- Genus: Crematogaster
- Species: C. rothneyi

Binomial name
- Crematogaster rothneyi Mayr, 1879

Species of ant

Crematogaster rothneyi is a species of ant of the subfamily Myrmicinae. It is one of the most widely distributed ants in Asia. It is named after George Alexander James Rothney.

== Subspecies ==
- Crematogaster rothneyi civa Forel, 1902 – India
- Crematogaster rothneyi haputalensis Forel, 1913 – Sri Lanka
- Crematogaster rothneyi rothneyi Mayr, 1879 – Cambodia, India, China
