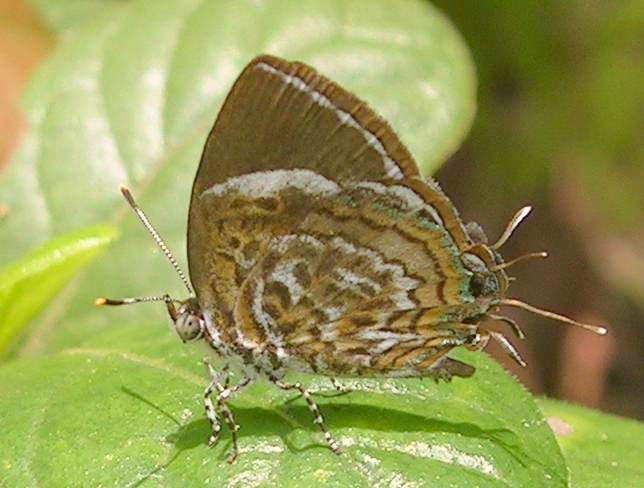
- Monkey puzzle, Rathinda amor

Scientific classification
- Kingdom: Animalia
- Phylum: Arthropoda
- Clade: Pancrustacea
- Class: Insecta
- Order: Lepidoptera
- Family: Lycaenidae
- Subfamily: Theclinae
- Tribe: Horagini

Genera
- See text

= Horagini =

Tribe of butterflies

The Horagini are a small tribe of butterflies in the family Lycaenidae. Ahmetia (formerly called Cowania), sometimes placed here, rather seems to belong to the Cheritrini however, but these are probably the Horagini's closest living relatives.

== Genera ==
The tribe contains a mere two genera at present, but as not all Theclinae have been assigned to tribes, following list of genera is preliminary:

- Horaga
- Rathinda
