= Lepidoptera Indica =

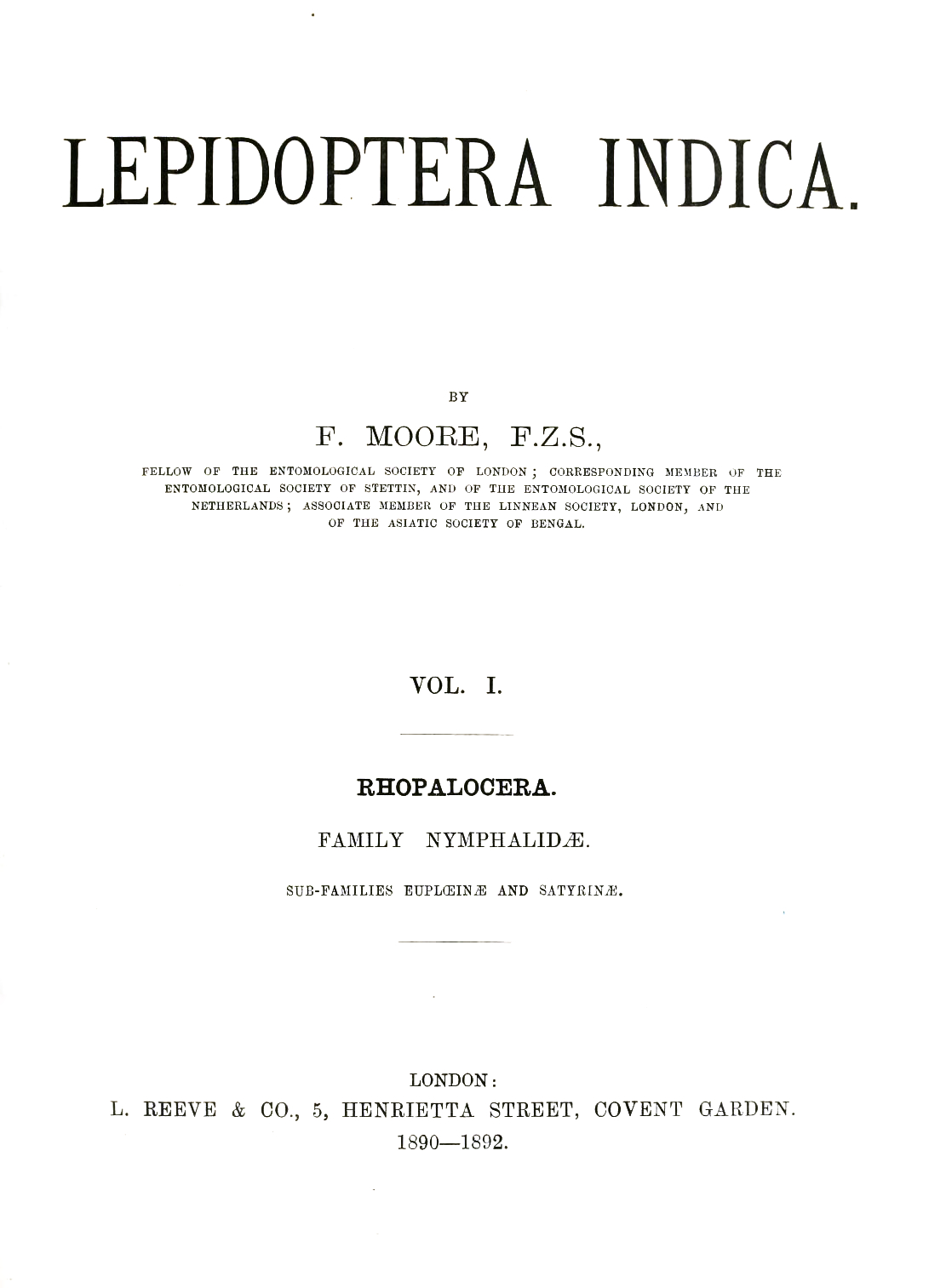
Cover of volume 1

Lepidoptera Indica was a 10 volume work on the butterflies of the Indian region that was begun in 1890 and completed in 1913. It was published by Lovell Reeve and Co. of London. It has been considered the magnum opus of its author, Frederic Moore, assistant curator at the museum of the East India Company. Frederic Moore described a number of new species through this publication. Moore was a splitter, known for careless creation of synonyms, sometimes placing the same species in more than one genus.

== History ==
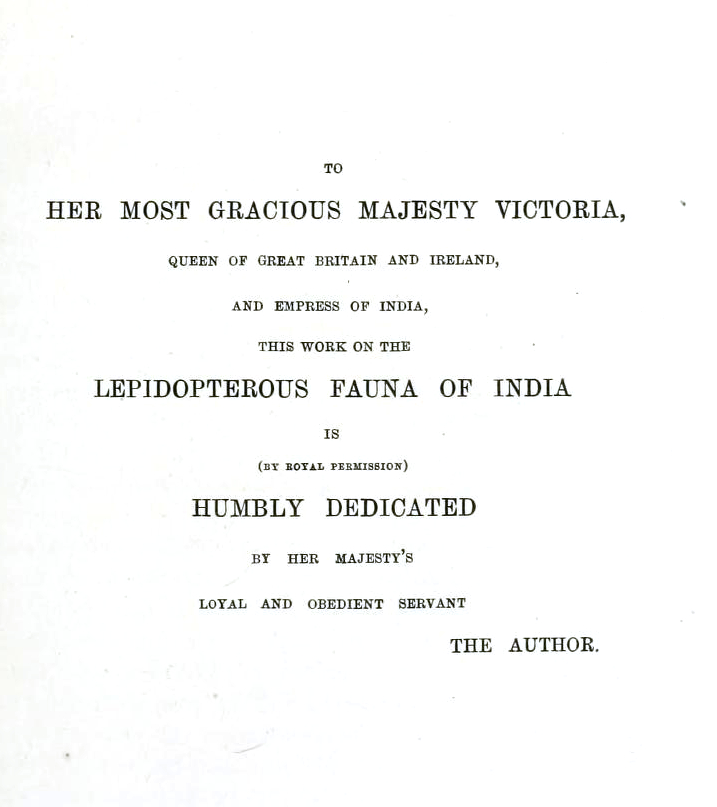
Dedication

The series was based on a large collection of butterflies that were under the care of the curator of the Asiatic Museum, Dr Thomas Horsfield. The museum was closed in 1879 and the collection was transferred to the British Museum. Moore in his preface defined the Indian region as being roughly bounded by the Himalayan mountains in the north, Suleiman and Hala mountains in the northwest, Ceylon to the South and Burma in the East and including the Andaman and Nicobar Islands. Moore however died before the work could be completed and the work was then taken over by Colonel Charles Swinhoe, brother of Robert Swinhoe and one of the founders of the Bombay Natural History Society.

The butterfly collections that were described in this work, many of which were previously undescribed had been made by additions from numerous correspondents and collectors in the Civil and Military services from across India. The first catalogue of these collections was prepared by Arthur Grote in 1857-1859. Grote also took notes on the life histories, making use of a Munshi Zynulabdin, a local artist. Moore also noted the contributions of Sir Walter Elliot from the Madras region, S. Nevill(e) Ward for notes from the Malabar coast, W. S. Atkinson, A.E. Russell, Colonel A.M. Lang (Oudh, Kashmir, Simla), Captain T. Hutton (Mussoorie), Captain H. L. de la Chaumette (Lucknow), C. Horne, Dr Francis Day, W. Forsyth Hunter, Major J. Le Mesurier, Major-Gen. G. Ramsay, Lt.-Col. H H G Godwin-Austin (sic), Captain R. Bayne Reed, W. B Farr, G. H. Wilkinson, Dr. A. Leith, Dr. J. Shortt, Capt. H. B. Hellard, W C Hewitson for material from the Atkinson collection, J. O Westwood for material collected by R. Hunter at Saugor, J. Anderson, James Wood-Mason, Rev. J. H. Hocking (Dharamsala), Mrs. F. A. de Roepstorff (for collections from the Andaman and Nicobar Islands made by her husband who was killed in 1883), A. Lindsay, G.A.J. Rothney, Colonel C. Swinhoe, Major J.W. Yerbury, Lionel de Niceville, H J Elwes, Hon. L. W. de Rothschild, G F Hampson (Nilgiris). Moore also thanks W F Kirby and A G Butler of the British Museum for nomenclature and bibliographic help. He also thanks private collectors including W L Distant, Godman and Salvin, H. Druce, Henley Grose-Smith and J.J. Weir, J H Leech and P. Crowley.

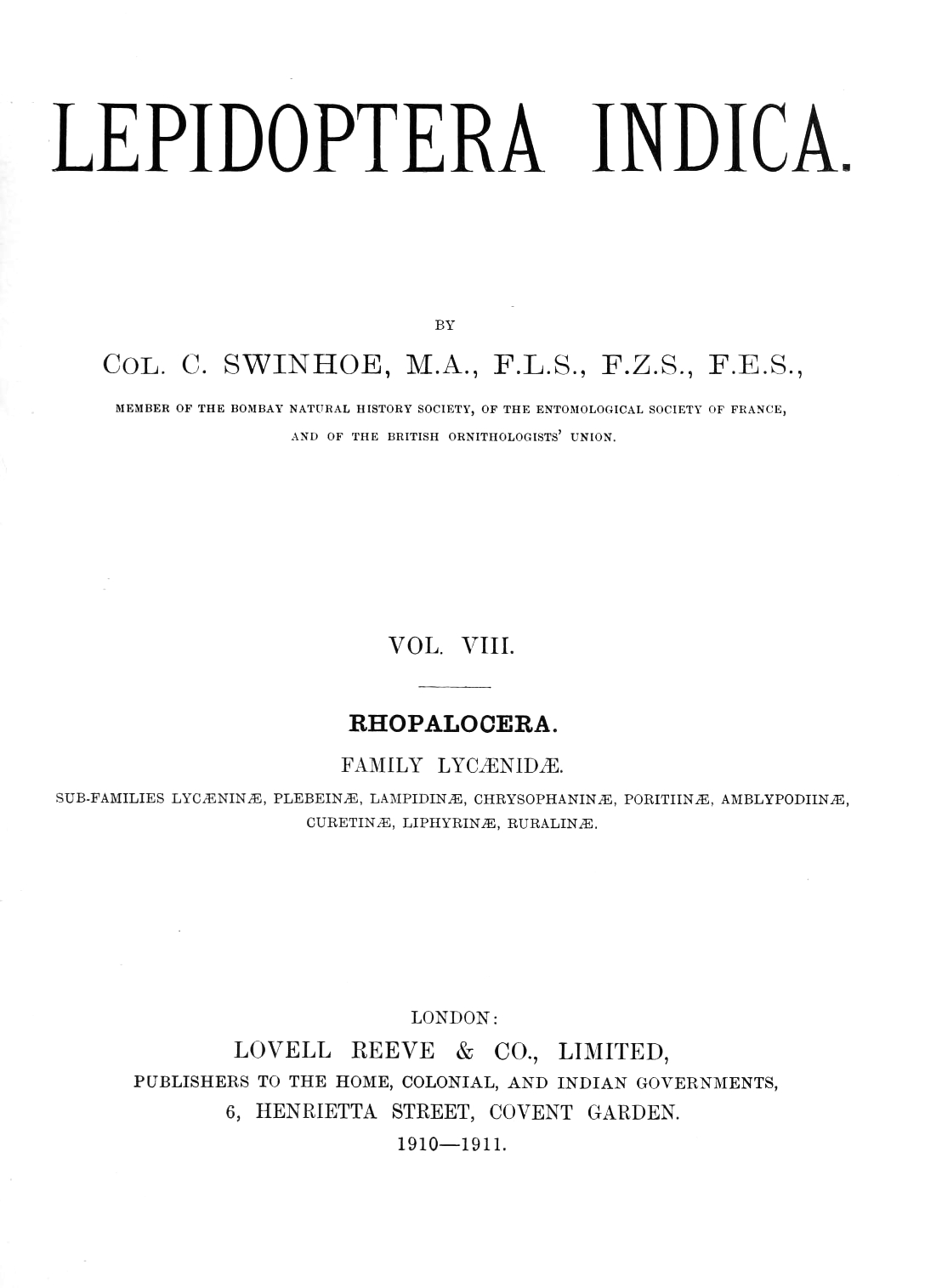
Cover of volume 8

The delineation and lithography for the first few volumes was done mainly by Moore's son F. C. Moore but later made use of other artists including John Nugent Fitch and E. C. Knight.

== Volumes ==
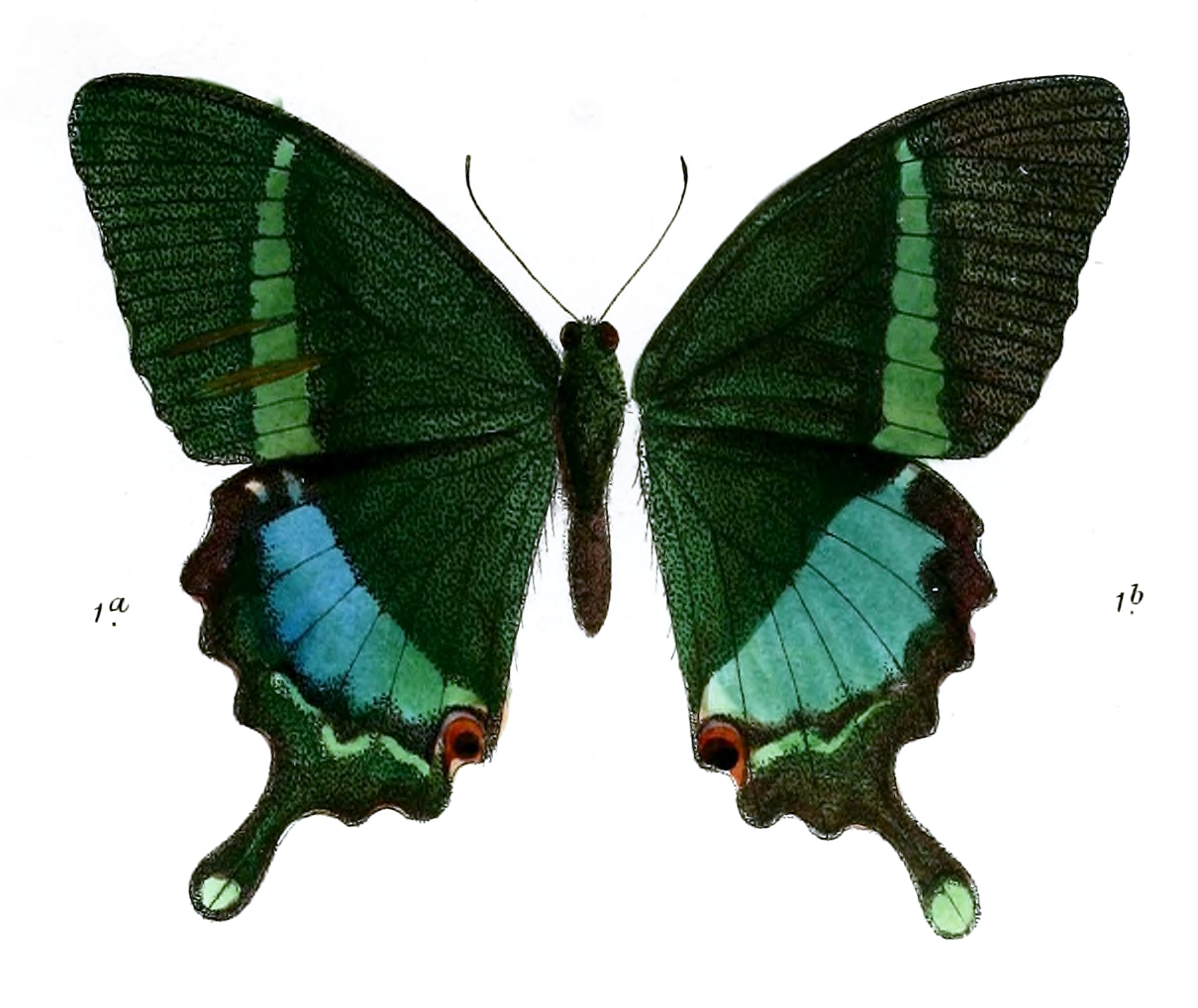
Illustration of Papilio crino from volume 6

- Volume 1 (1890–1892) Nymphalidae (Euploeinae and Satyrinae)
- Volume 2 (1893–1896) Nymphalidae (Elymniinae, Amathusiinae, Nymphalinae)
- Volume 3 (1896–1899) Nymphalidae (Nymphalinae continued)
- Volume 4 (1899–1900) Nymphalide (Nymphalinae continued)
- Volume 5 (1901–1903) Nymphalidae, Riodinidae, Papilionidae
- Volume 6 (1903–1905) Family Papilionidae & Pieridae

Moore died in 1907 and from volume 7, the work was taken over by Colonel Charles Swinhoe

- Volume 7 (1905–1910) Subfamily Pierinae & Lycaenidae

By the 8th volume, there were photographs of the genitalia of some species.

- Volume 8 (1910–1911) Lycaenidae
- Volume 9 (1911–1912) Lycaenidae (continued), Hesperiidae
- Volume 10 (1912–1913) Hesperiidae

== Commentaries and analyses ==
Moore was a splitter and did not follow the concept of subspecies for polytypic forms. Moore often created multiple genera for members of the same species, often in the same volume, leading to difficulties for early taxonomists to establish priority. The treatment was much improved after Swinhoe took over.

James Cecil Mottram and his colleagues analyzed the statistical distributions of the extent and colours of butterflies, making use of the plates from Lepidoptera Indica.
