= Arhopala aedias yendava =

Singapore oakblue

Scientific classification
- Kingdom: Animalia
- Phylum: Arthropoda
- Clade: Pancrustacea
- Class: Insecta
- Order: Lepidoptera
- Family: Lycaenidae
- Genus: Arhopala
- Species: A. aedias
- Subspecies: A. a. yendava

Trinomial name
- Arhopala aedias yendava (Grose-Smith, 1887)

Synonyms
- Amblypodia yendava Grose-Smith, 1887

Subspecies of butterfly

Arhopala aedias yendava, the Singapore oakblue, is a subspecies of Arhopala aedias a small butterfly found in India that belongs to the lycaenids or blues family.

This beautiful species is above in both sexes dark lilac, the female with a black distal margin of an average width of 4 mm. The postmedian band of the forewdng is here also in the centre very much interrupted, but the two ends of the interruption are nevertheless contiguous, which is not the case in nominate aedias.

== Range ==
The butterfly occurs in India from Sikkim onto Myanmar.

== Status ==
Rare.

== See also ==
- List of butterflies of India (Lycaenidae)
