= George Alexander James Rothney =

George Alexander James Rothney (7 October 1849 – 31 January 1922) was an amateur entomologist and businessman who collected extensively in India. He collected and wrote notes on the behaviour of various species and a number of species of insect were described from his collections including Crematogaster rothneyi, Meranoplus rothneyi, and Leptothorax rothneyi.

Rothney was born in Kensington, the son of the stationer George Stonard Rothney and Arabella. Rothney's father was a partner in the company John Dickinson and Company. Rothney went to Calcutta to work with C. W. Scott and Co. merchants but after the death of his father, he became involved in establishing a branch of Dickinson and company in Calcutta, India in 1872. He lived in Calcutta near Barrackpore Park and collected insect specimens in his spare time and interacted with many English entomologists of his time. He was particularly interested in the hymenoptera and wrote extensively on his collections. He joined the Entomological Society of London in 1868. He donated his specimens to the Hope Collections at Oxford University. He was also a keen athlete and sportsman, introducing long-distance running in India and Rugby in Calcutta. He was involved in establishing the Calcutta Cup as secretary of the Calcutta Football Club in Calcutta which was folded in 1877. The club's silver and left-over assets of rupees 270 was made use of to make the Calcutta cup. The cup made in Indian design with three cobras on the side and an elephant on the top was made on his suggestion and presented to the Rugby Union. He also bequeathed 150 to the Entomological Society. He retired from John Dickinson and company as secretary in 1916, a position he had held from 1886.
