= E. C. Knight (illustrator) =

English illustrator

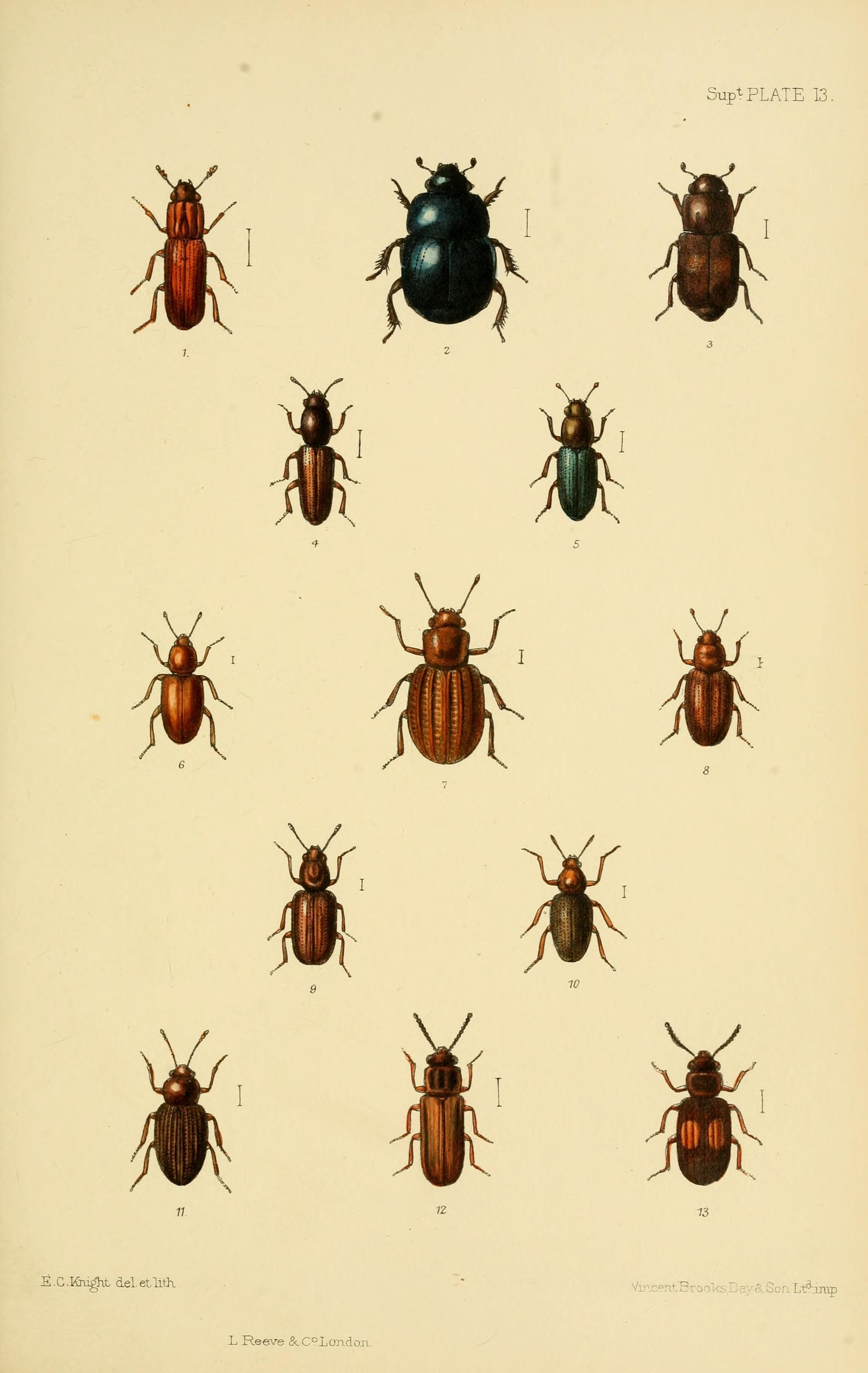
Plate from The Coleoptera of the British islands E. C. Knight del. lith.

E. C. Knight (1879 fl. -1915 fl.) was an English illustrator. He undertook zoological entomological and botanical drawing, lithography, and chromolithography for William Weekes Fowler, Frederic Moore, Edmund Reitter and Emily Mary Bowdler Sharpe among others. Knight worked in association with the Zoological Society of London.

E. C. and his brother Horace Knight worked for Messrs. West, Newman & Co., in London.
