= James Cecil Mottram =

British physician and naturalist

James Cecil Mottram (12 December 1879 – 4 October 1945) was a British physician and naturalist. He conducted studies on cancer, conducted experiments on mutation induction using X-rays and contributed to ideas on camouflage.

== Life and work ==
Mottram was born in Holt, Norfolk to James Alfred and Clara Ellen Swanzy. He studied at the Beacon, Sevenoaks before studying medicine at University College, London. He then joined Cambridge, obtained a PhD in 1906 and joined the Cancer research laboratory of Middlesex Hospital. In 1913 he published on the susceptibility of growing tissues to gamma radiation and he continued these studies. Another study he made was on camouflage which he published in 1914 as Controlled natural selection and value marking (1914) which made use of group selection. He served briefly with the navy during World War I serving as the experimental officer in the Camouflage School. He also conducted studies on the colours of butterflies (based on illustrations in Frederic Moore's Lepidoptera Indica). He then conducted research at the Radium Institute from 1919 and from 1937 at the Mount Vernon Hospital. He also took an interest in theorizing on fly fishing while being a hobby fisherman. He wrote the entry on "camouflage" in the Encyclopedia Britannica 12th edition.
