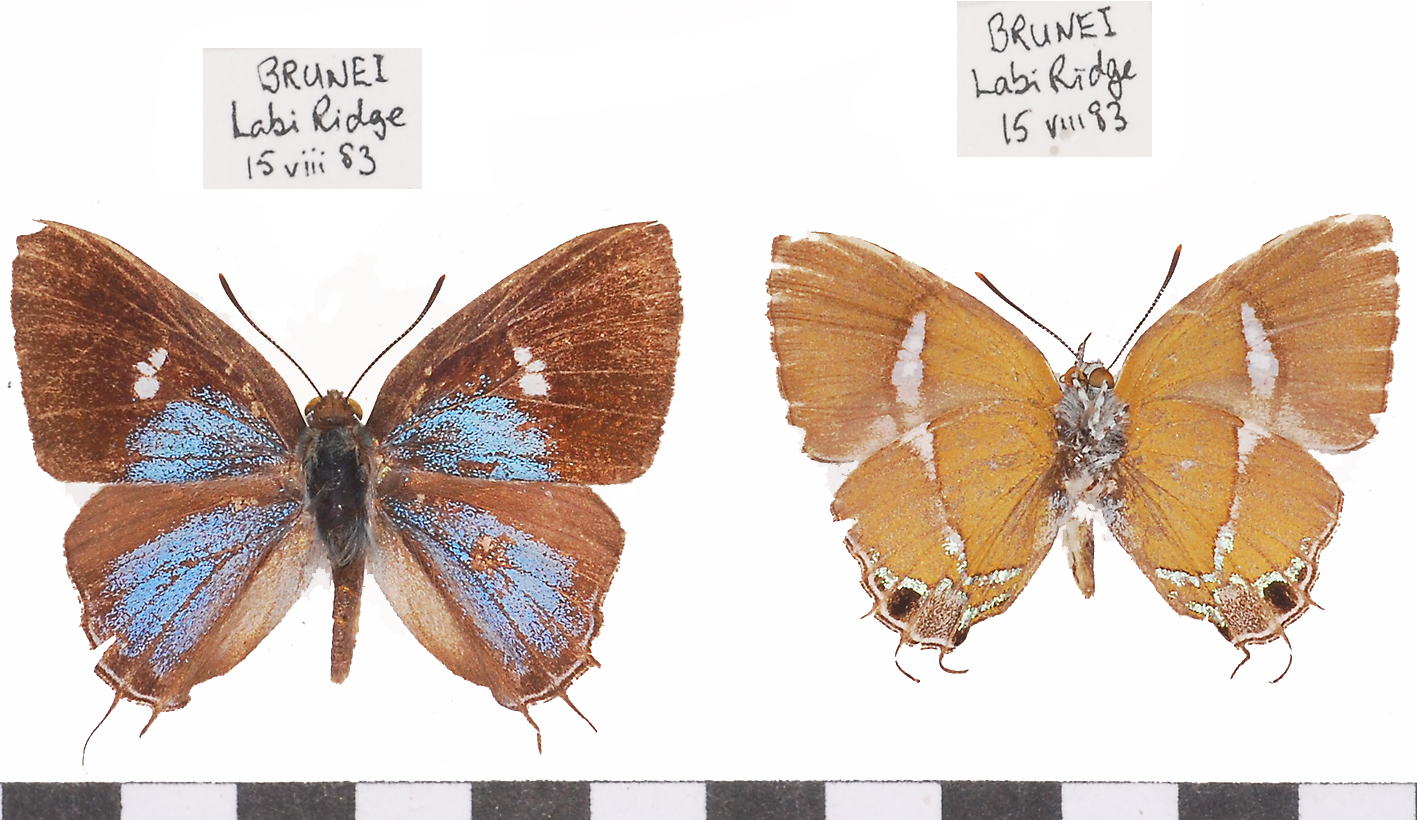
- Horaga syrinx maena

Scientific classification
- Kingdom: Animalia
- Phylum: Arthropoda
- Class: Insecta
- Order: Lepidoptera
- Family: Lycaenidae
- Genus: Horaga
- Species: H. syrinx

Binomial name
- Horaga syrinx (C. Felder, 1860)

= Horaga syrinx =

Yellow onyx

Species of butterfly

Horaga syrinx, the yellow onyx, is a species of lycaenid or hairstreak butterfly found in the Indomalayan realm and (crossing the Wallace Line) New Guinea.

== Range ==
H. syrinx is found in northern India, Malaya, Indonesia, Philippines, Sulawesi, the Moluccas and New Guinea

== Subspecies ==
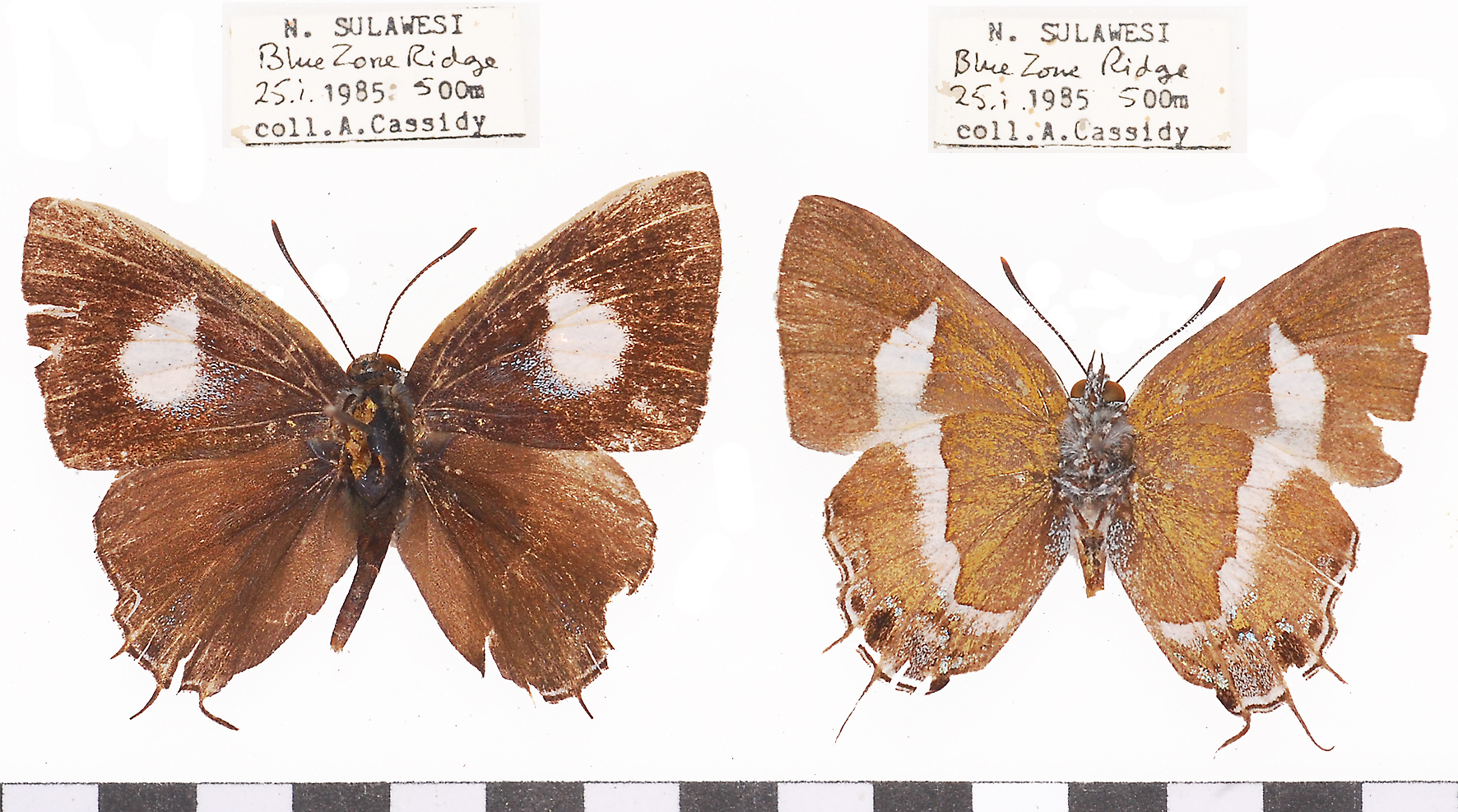
Horaga syrinx permagna Celebes

Many (see ) The more known are

- Horaga syrinx maenala Hewitson, 1869 from Malacca and Sumatra, is above violet instead of blue, the white discal spot also proximally encircled with dark; under surface is ochreous.
- Horaga syrinx onychina (Staudinger, 1889). Male with very little black in the forewing and discal spot in the blue area. Beneath a dark hue in the apical third of the forewing. Java
- Horaga syrinx privigna Fruhstorfer, 1897.Indonesia, Lombok. differs from the typical in the lighter colour of the upper and under wings on both sides and the regular shape of the median band on the hindwing underside..
- Horaga syrinx schoutensis Joicey & Talbot, 1916 New Guinea, Schouten Is., Biak. Large and the white spot of the forewing is still larger; blue of the upper surface is reduced, the forewing showing light blue proximad and below the discal spot.The hind wing almost entirely brownish grey with only the centre light bluish.
- Horaga syrinx paulla Fruhstorfer, [1912] Philippines Larger, above darker blue with the apical part of the wing is more Under surface greenish-yellow the apical part with a slight brown hue.

== See also ==
- List of butterflies of India
- List of butterflies of India (Lycaenidae)
