= Horace Knight =

British natural history illustrator

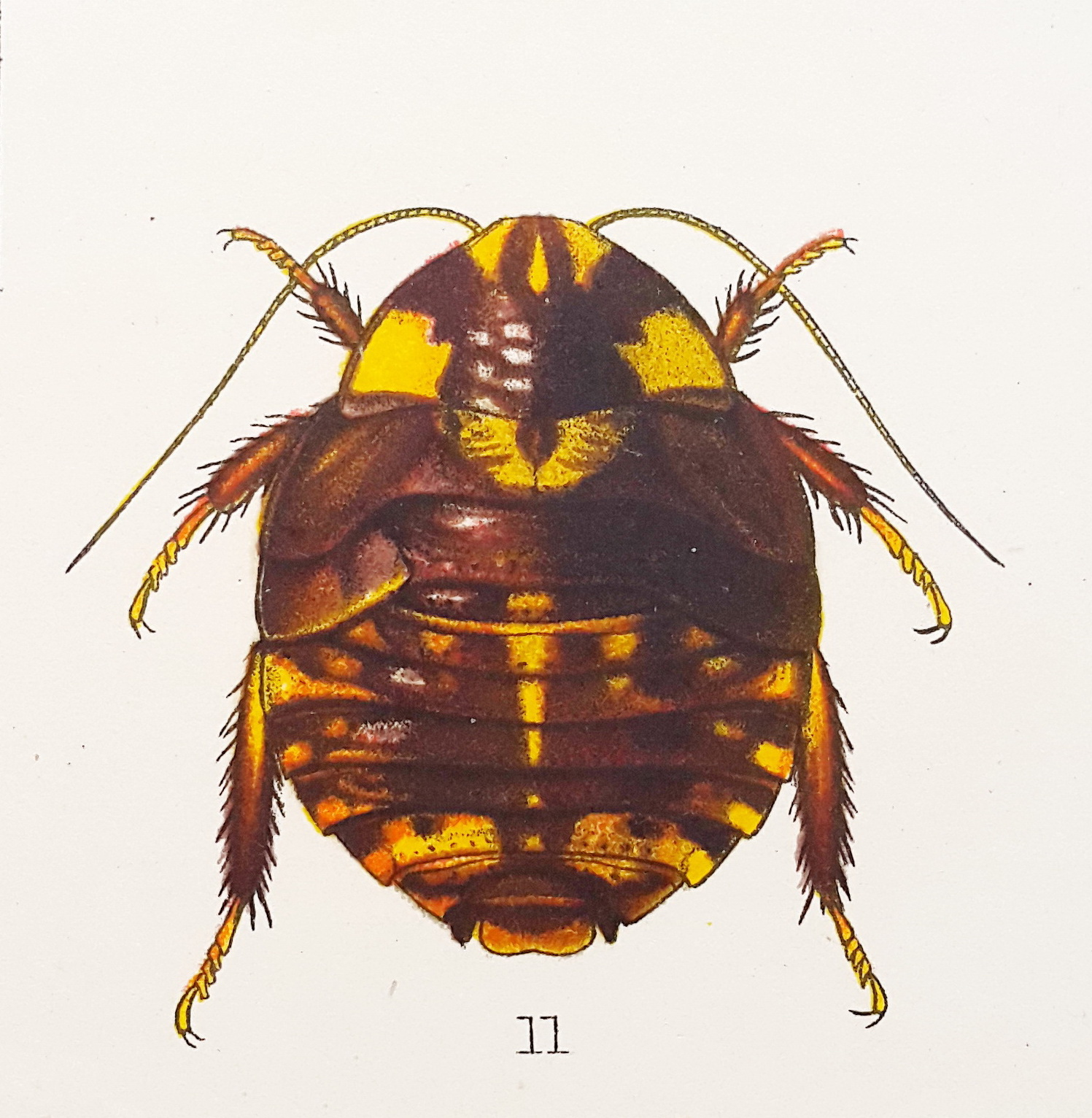
Acanthogyna deplanata

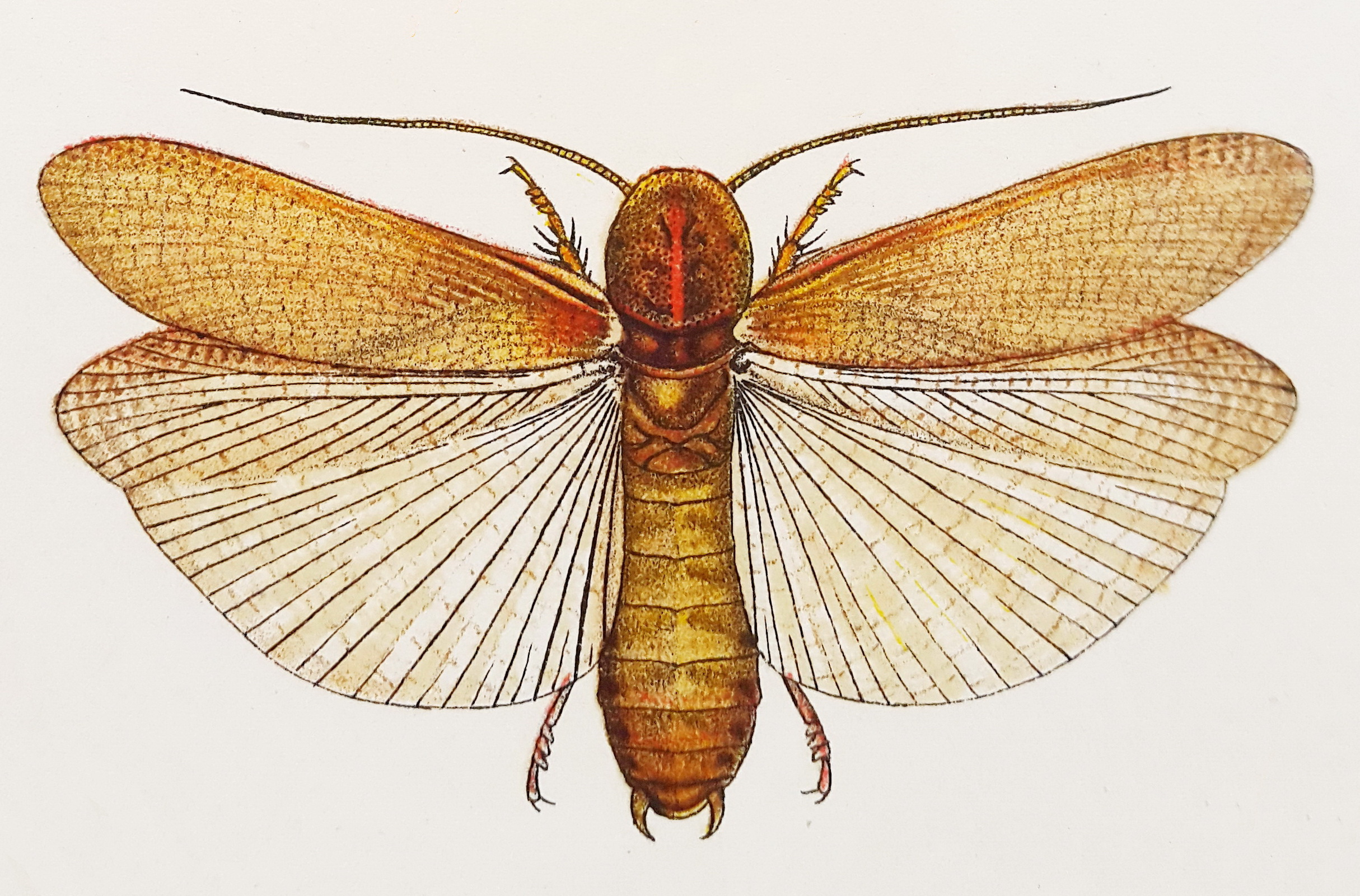
Pilema cribrosa

Horace Knight (fl. 1884–1920) was a natural history illustrator with the British Museum, noted particularly for his images in The Moths of the British Isles by Richard South.

== Biography ==
Knight, who lived at 16 Dafforne Road, Upper Tooting, had a son, Edgar S. Knight, who also illustrated. Horace Knight retired from the British Museum in 1917 due to illness, at which point he had been producing drawings for William Lucas Distant for over 30 years, working for the chromo-lithographers and letter-press printers, West, Newman & Co. of Hatton Garden.

Horace and his brother E. C. Knight worked together at West, Newman & Co.

His work appeared in

- Henry C. Lang : Rhopalocera Europae descripta et delineata / The butterflies of Europe described and figured., London, L. Reeve 1884
- John Henry Leech/Richard South: Butterflies from China, Japan and Corea, Transactions of the Entomological Society of London 1901
- Charles Thomas Bingham: The Fauna of British India, Including Ceylon and Burma: Butterflies 1905-7
- William Lucas Distant: Insecta Transvaaliensia 1924
- William John Stokoe ed.: The Observer's Book of British Butterflies 1969
- Seitz, Adalbert.: "Die Großschmetterlinge der Erde". 1906-1940. Alfred Kernen Verlag

His collaborators were entomologist Carl Plötz, artist Alice Ellen Prout and entomologist Humphrey Drummond Swain.
