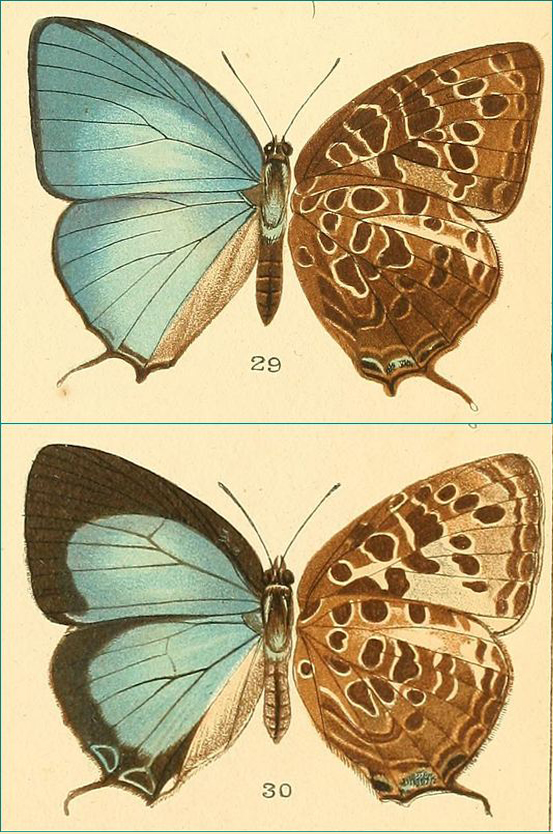

Scientific classification
- Kingdom: Animalia
- Phylum: Arthropoda
- Clade: Pancrustacea
- Class: Insecta
- Order: Lepidoptera
- Family: Lycaenidae
- Genus: Arhopala
- Species: A. anarte

Binomial name
- Arhopala anarte (Hewitson, 1862)

Synonyms
- Amblypodia anarte Hewitson, 1862; Arhopala morphicolor Corbet, 1941; Arhopala auzea de Nicéville, [1896]

= Arhopala anarte =

Magnificent oakblue

Species of butterfly

Arhopala anarte, the magnificent oakblue, is a species of butterfly belonging to the lycaenid family described by William Chapman Hewitson in 1862. It is found in Southeast Asia (Manipur, Burma, Assam, Peninsular Malaya, Thailand, Borneo, Sumatra and Java).

Glaringly light blue, though also specimens with violet or lilac tints may occur. The postmedian transverse bands of the rather red-brown under surface morebroken up into single spots; sometimes only the costal spots of these bands are yet distinct.

== Subspecies ==
- Arhopala anarte anarte (Assam to Peninsular Malaysia, Thailand, Borneo, Sumatra, possibly Palawan)
- Arhopala anarte auzea de Nicéville, [1896] (Java) male above is silvery light blue with a violet reflection, the costal and distal margins being broad darker blue, but not black. Beneath all the spots of the transverse bands are separate.

== Gallery ==
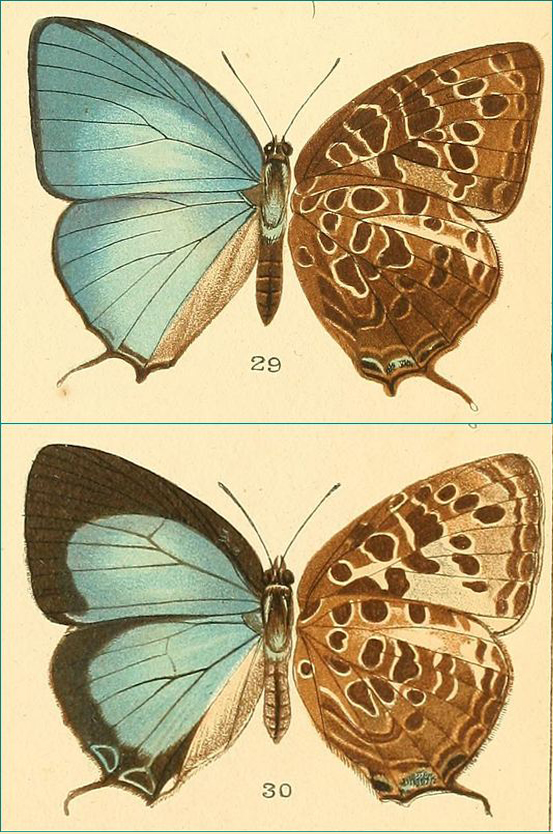

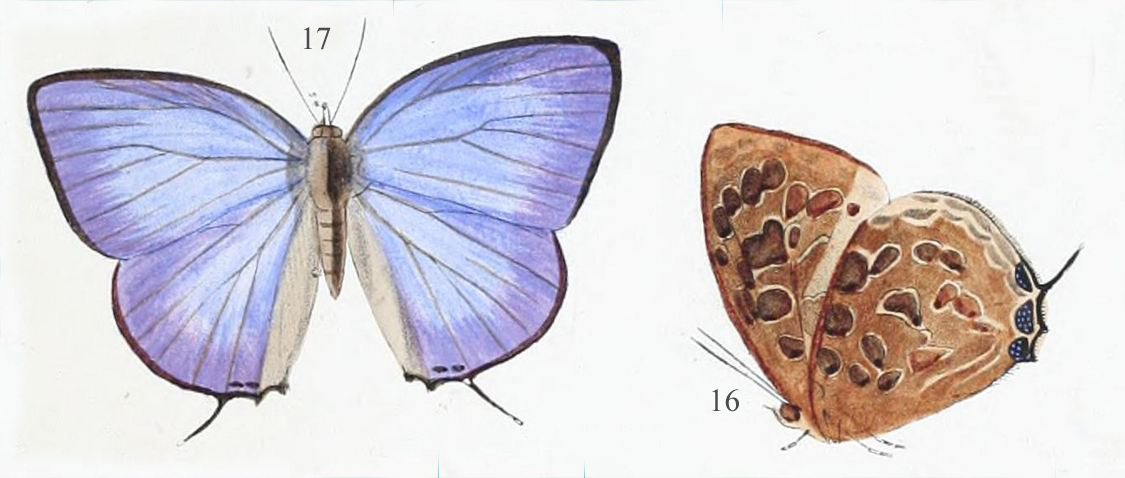

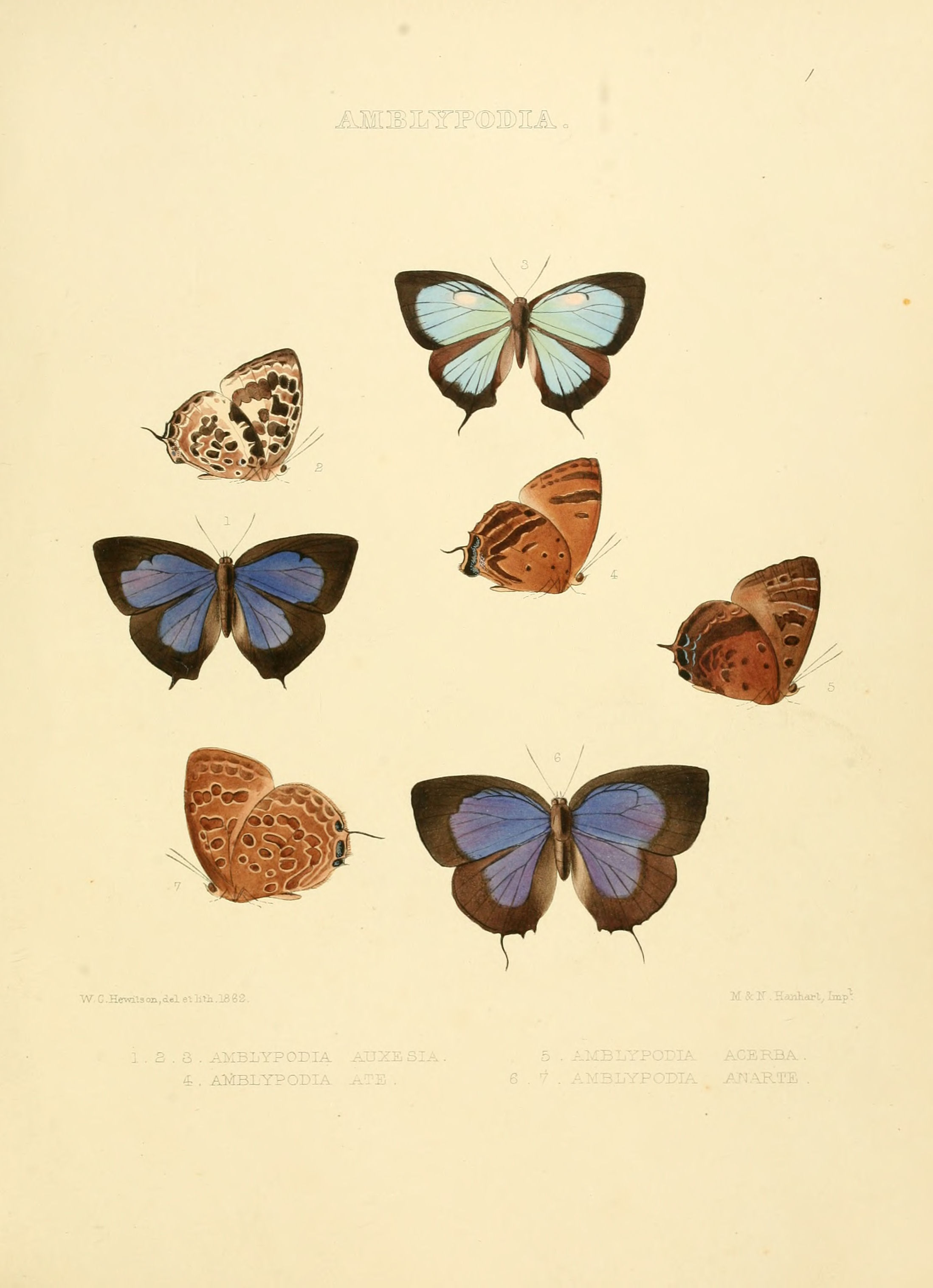

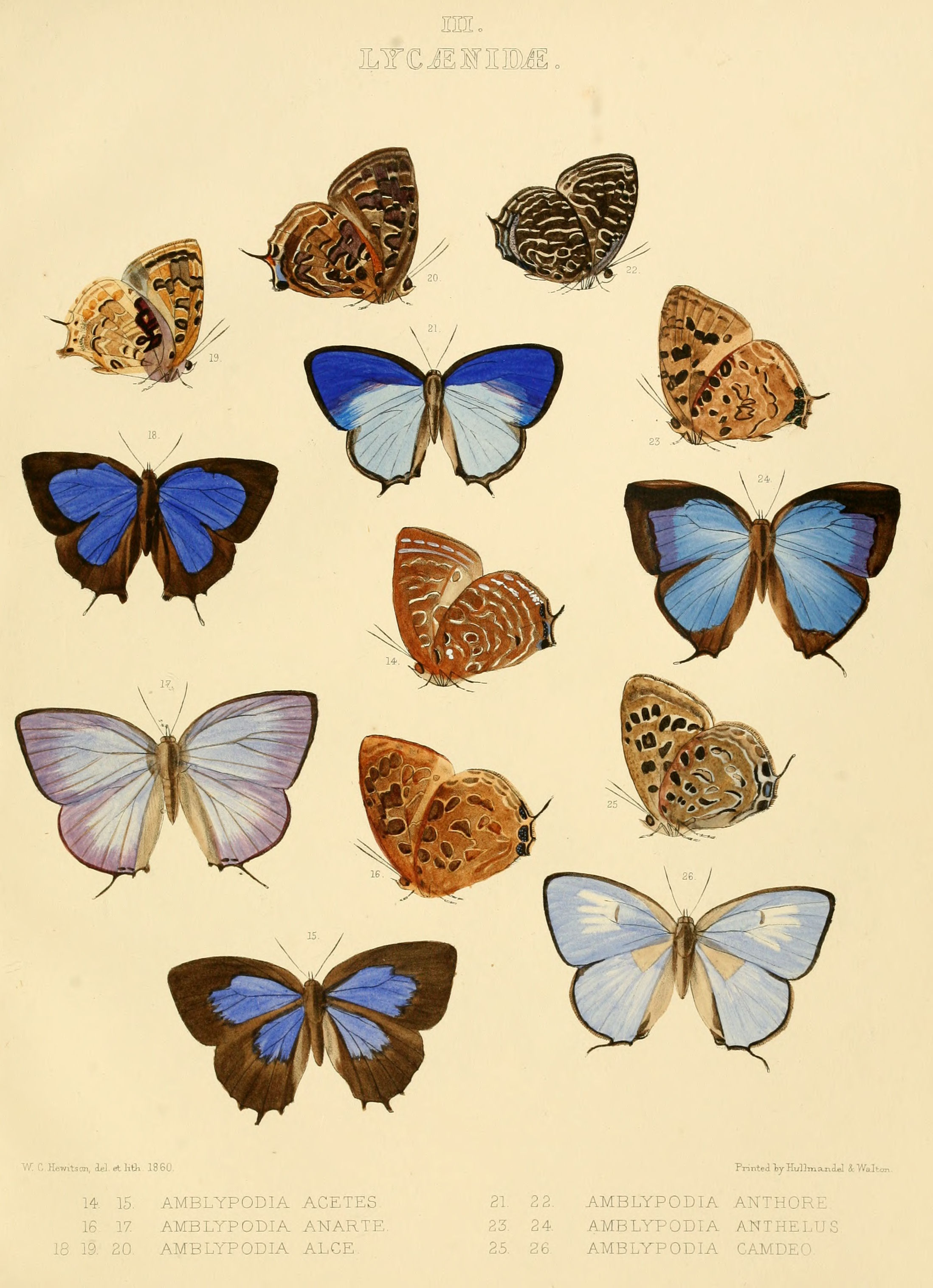

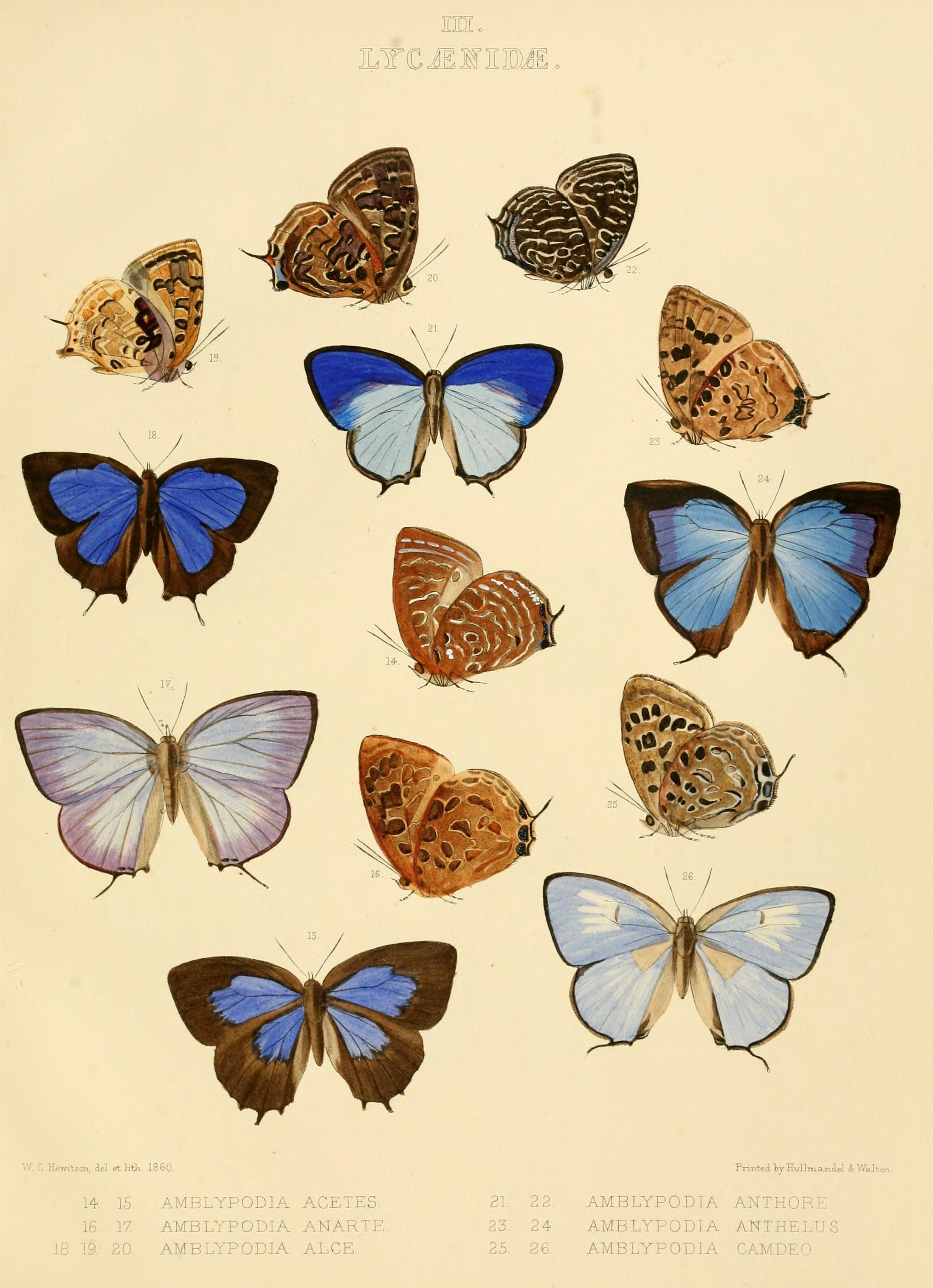
