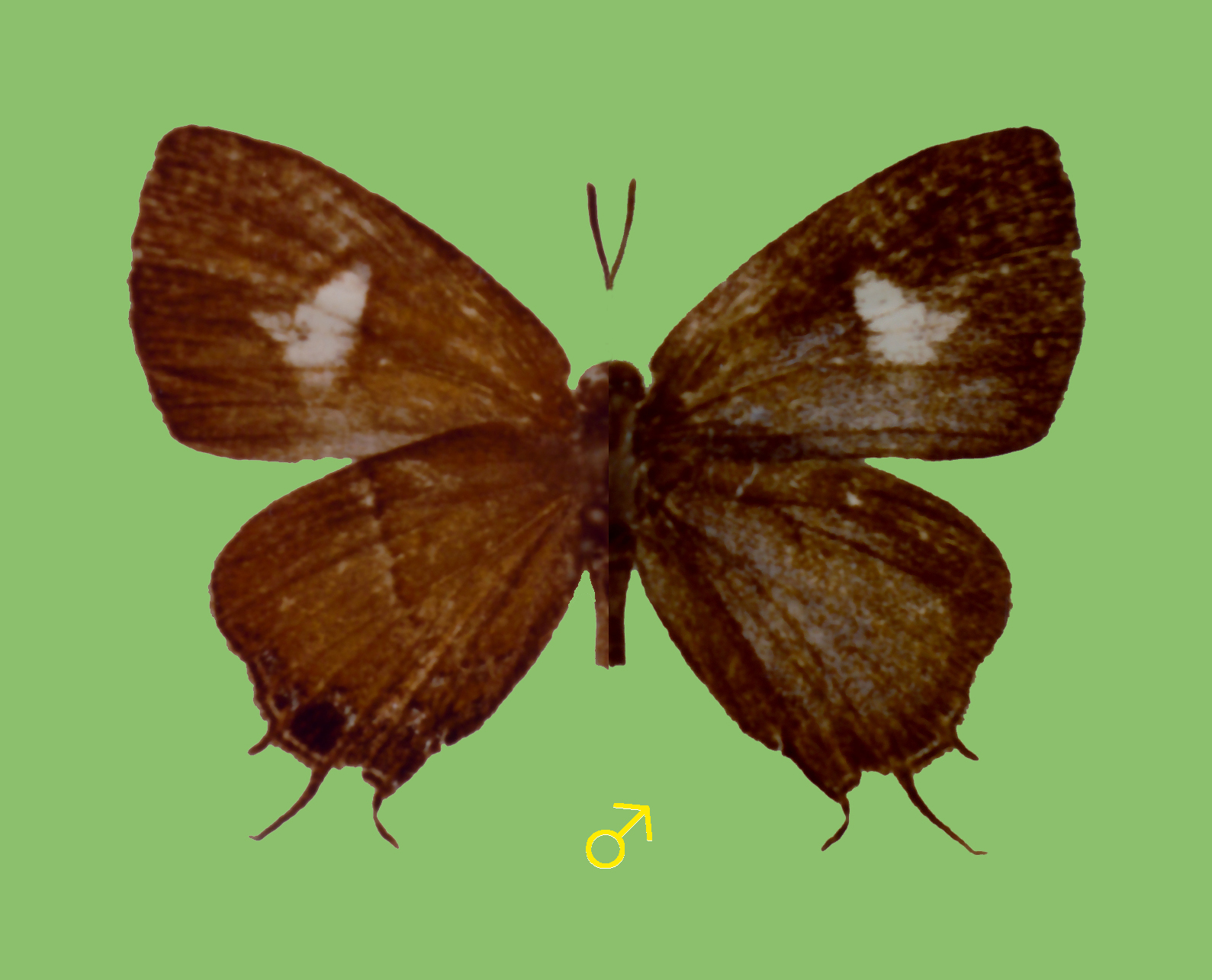
- Horaga albimacula ohkuboi male

Scientific classification
- Kingdom: Animalia
- Phylum: Arthropoda
- Class: Insecta
- Order: Lepidoptera
- Family: Lycaenidae
- Genus: Horaga
- Species: H. albimacula

Binomial name
- Horaga albimacula (Wood-Mason & de Nicéville, 1881)

= Horaga albimacula =

Violet onyx

Species of butterfly

Horaga albimacula, the violet onyx, is a species of lycaenid or blue butterfly found in the Indomalayan realm.

== Subspecies ==
- H. a. albimacula Andamans -white band of the forewing beneath is only continued as a dull brightening on the hindwing.
- H. a. viola Moore, 1882 Sikkim, Assam, India, Ceylon, Burma
- H. a. anara Fruhstorfer, 1898 Java much smaller than the nominate and the white spot more roundish.
- H. a. bellula Fruhstorfer, 1897 Sumbawa -beneath a small, feebly widening spot on the forewing and a deep dark red-brown ground-colour.
- H. a. albistigmata Moulton, 1912 northern Borneo (Swarawak, Madihit Hills)
- H. a. anytus (Staudinger, 1889) Palawan
- H. a. triumphalis Murayama & Sibatani, 1943 Taiwan
- H. a. ohkuboi H.Hayashi, 1984 Nias

== See also ==
- List of butterflies of India
- List of butterflies of India (Lycaenidae)
