= Frederic Moore =

British entomologist (1830–1907)

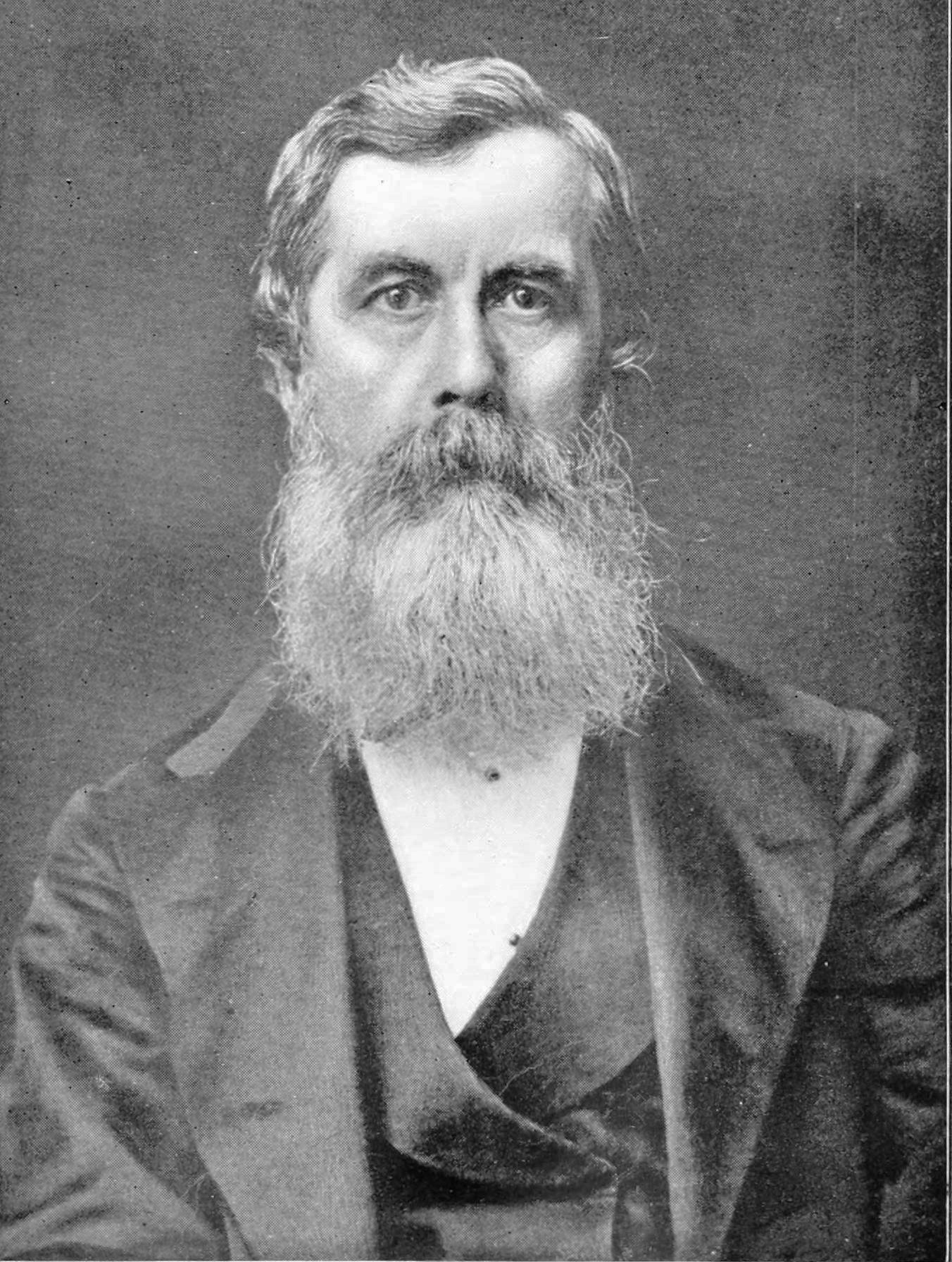
- Born: Frederic Moore; 13 May 1830; United Kingdom
- Died: 10 May 1907 (aged 76)

Frederic Moore FZS (13 May 1830 – 10 May 1907) was a British entomologist and illustrator. He produced six volumes of Lepidoptera Indica and a catalogue of the birds in the collection of the East India Company.

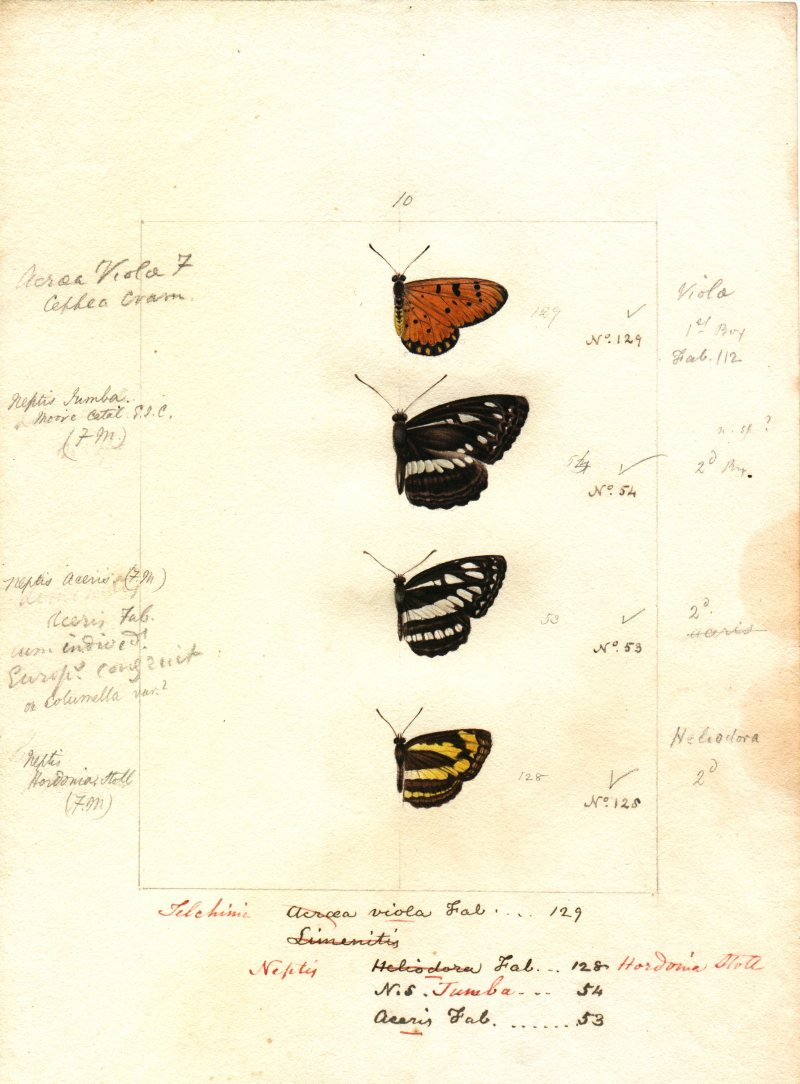
A watercolour plate by Robert Templeton with notes by Moore on the left margin

It has been said that Moore was born at 33 Bruton Street, but that may be incorrect given that this was the address of the menagerie and office of the Zoological Society of London from 1826 to 1836. Moore was appointed an assistant in the East India Company Museum in London from 31 May 1848 on a "disestablished basis" and became a temporary writer and then an assistant curator at the East India Company Museum with a pension of £330 per annum from 31 December 1879. He had a daughter, Rosa Martha Moore. He began compiling Lepidoptera indica (1890–1913), a major work on the butterflies of the South Asia in 10 volumes, which was completed after his death by Charles Swinhoe. Many of the plates were produced by his son while some others were produced by E C Knight and John Nugent Fitch. Many species of butterfly were described by him in this work.

"Moore entered the doors of entomology by way of his artistic abilities. Dr. T. Horsfield (1777–1859), long associated with the East India Museum, required someone capable of doing natural history drawings and, through an introduction, Frederic Moore obtained the post. Thus began a lifetime association with Indian Lepidoptera".

Moore's son F. C. Moore was also an artist and prepared many of the plates in Lepidoptera Indica. Moore's brother T. J. Moore was a curator at the Liverpool Museum for forty years and his son Thomas Francis Moore was an osteologist at the National Museum at Melbourne.

The colours of Indian butterflies, based on the plates in the Lepidoptera Indica were studied by J.C. Mottram in 1918.

Moore was an associate of the Linnean Society of London, a member of the Entomological Society of London, a corresponding member of the Entomological Society of Stettin and of the Entomological Society of the Netherlands. His other works included A Catalogue of the Birds in the Museum of the East-India Company (1854–58, with Thomas Horsfield) and The Lepidoptera of Ceylon (1880–87).
