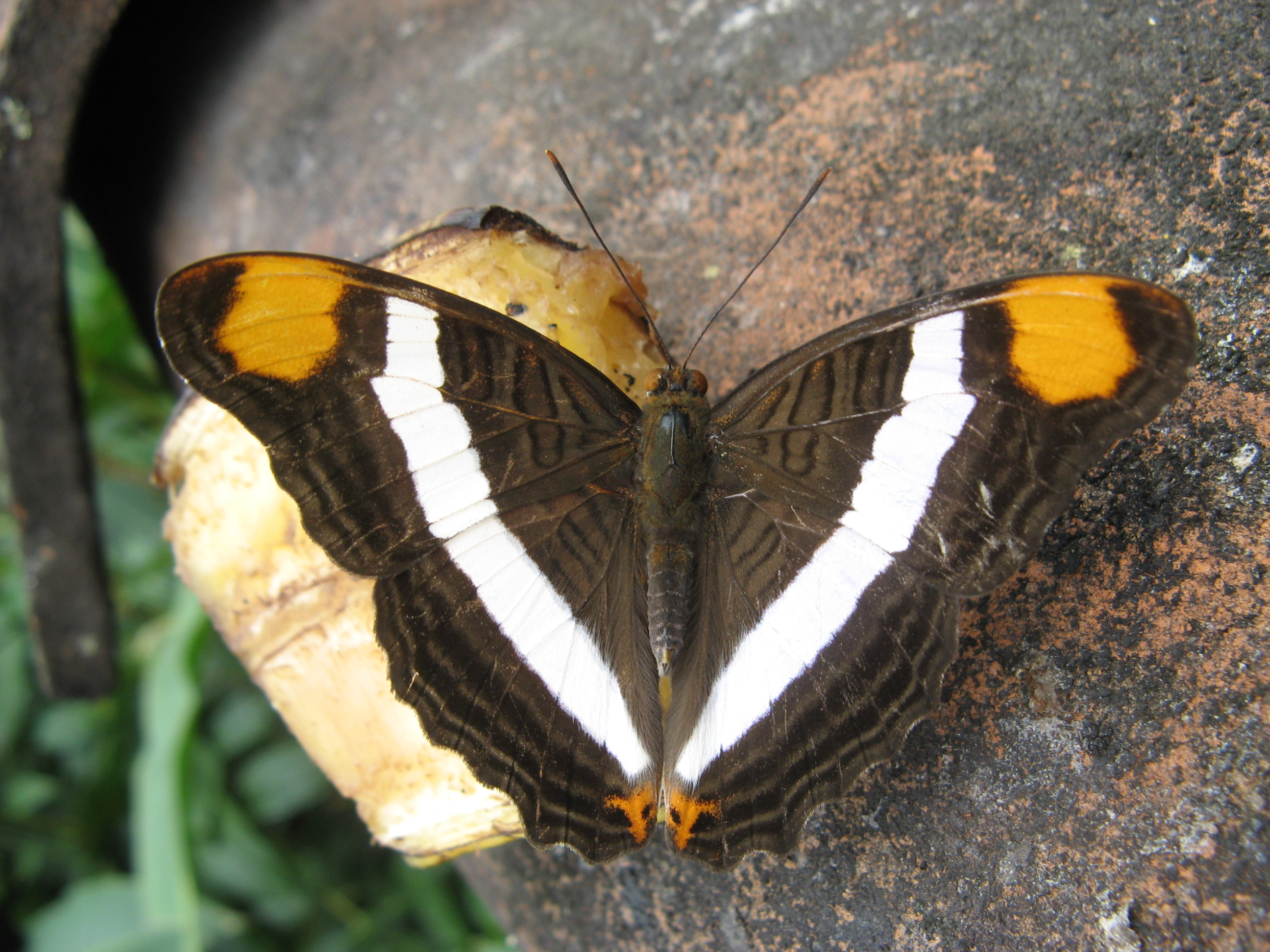
- Band-celled sister (Adelpha fessonia)

Scientific classification
- Domain: Eukaryota
- Kingdom: Animalia
- Phylum: Arthropoda
- Class: Insecta
- Order: Lepidoptera
- Family: Nymphalidae
- Subfamily: Limenitidinae
- Tribe: Limenitidini (Behr, 1864)

Genera
- See text

= Limenitidini =

Tribe of butterflies

Limenitidini is a tribe of brush-footed butterflies of the subfamily Limenitidinae.

== Genera ==
In alphabetical order:

- Adelpha Hübner, [1819] – sisters
- Athyma Westwood, [1850] – sergeants
- Auzakia Moore, [1898]
- Cymothoe Hübner, [1819] – gliders
- Harma Doubleday, [1848] – gliders
- Kumothales Overlaet, 1940
- Lamasia Moore, [1898]
- Lebadea Felder, 1861
- Lelecella Hemming, 1939
- Limenitis Fabricius, 1807 – admirals
- Litinga Moore, [1898]
- Moduza Moore, [1881] – commanders
- Patsuia Moore, [1898]
- Pandita Moore, 1857
- Parasarpa Moore, [1898]
- Pseudacraea Westwood, [1850] – false acraeas
- Pseudoneptis Snellen, 1882 – blue sailers
- Sumalia Moore, [1898]
- Tarattia Moore, [1898]
