= Neptini =

Neptini(s) may refer to:

- Neptini, a butterfly tribe in Limenitidinae
- Neptini, an alternate term for a population of exoplanets including Super-Earths and Sub-Neptunes
