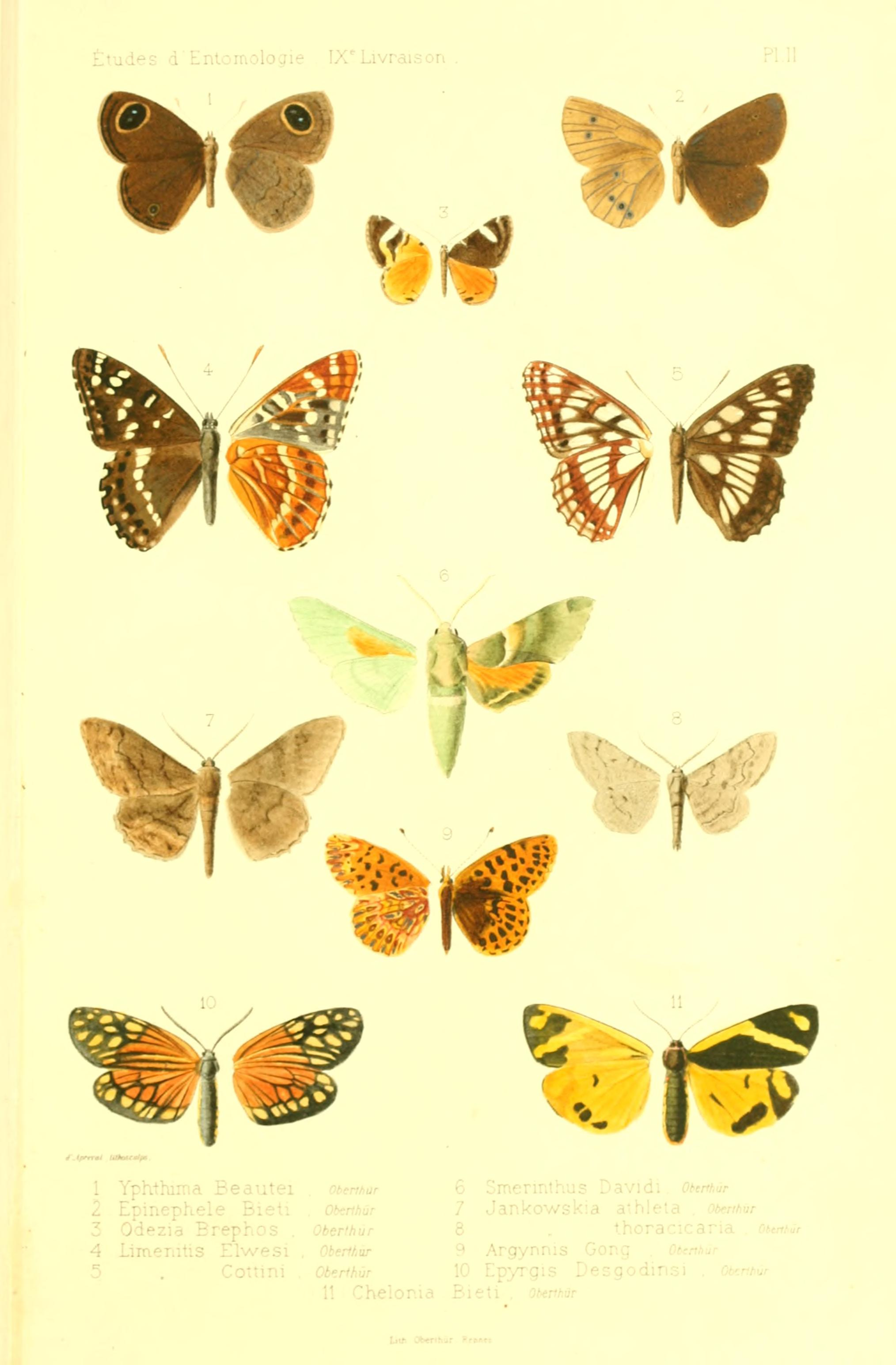
- Chalinga elwesi in Oberthür Études d'entomologie (vol. IX, plate II)

Scientific classification
- Kingdom: Animalia
- Phylum: Arthropoda
- Class: Insecta
- Order: Lepidoptera
- Family: Nymphalidae
- Genus: Chalinga
- Species: C. elwesi

Binomial name
- Chalinga elwesi (Charles Oberthür, 1883)

= Chalinga elwesi =

Species of butterfly

Chalinga elwesi is an East Palearctic butterfly in the family Nymphalidae (Limenitidinae).

It is found in China and Tibet. The larva feeds on Populus and Salix.
