= Abrota (butterfly) =

- Abrota in Thomas Horsfield and Frederic Moore's A catalogue of the lepidopterous insects in the Museum of the Hon. East-India Company. (figure 1)

Scientific classification
- Kingdom: Animalia
- Phylum: Arthropoda
- Class: Insecta
- Order: Lepidoptera
- Family: Nymphalidae
- Subfamily: Limenitidinae
- Genus: Abrota Moore, 1857

Genus of butterflies

Abrota is a genus of brush-footed butterflies from Sikkim, China and Taiwan.

Species:

- Abrota ganga Moore, 1857
- Abrota mirus Fabricius, 1793
- Abrota pratti Leech, 1891
