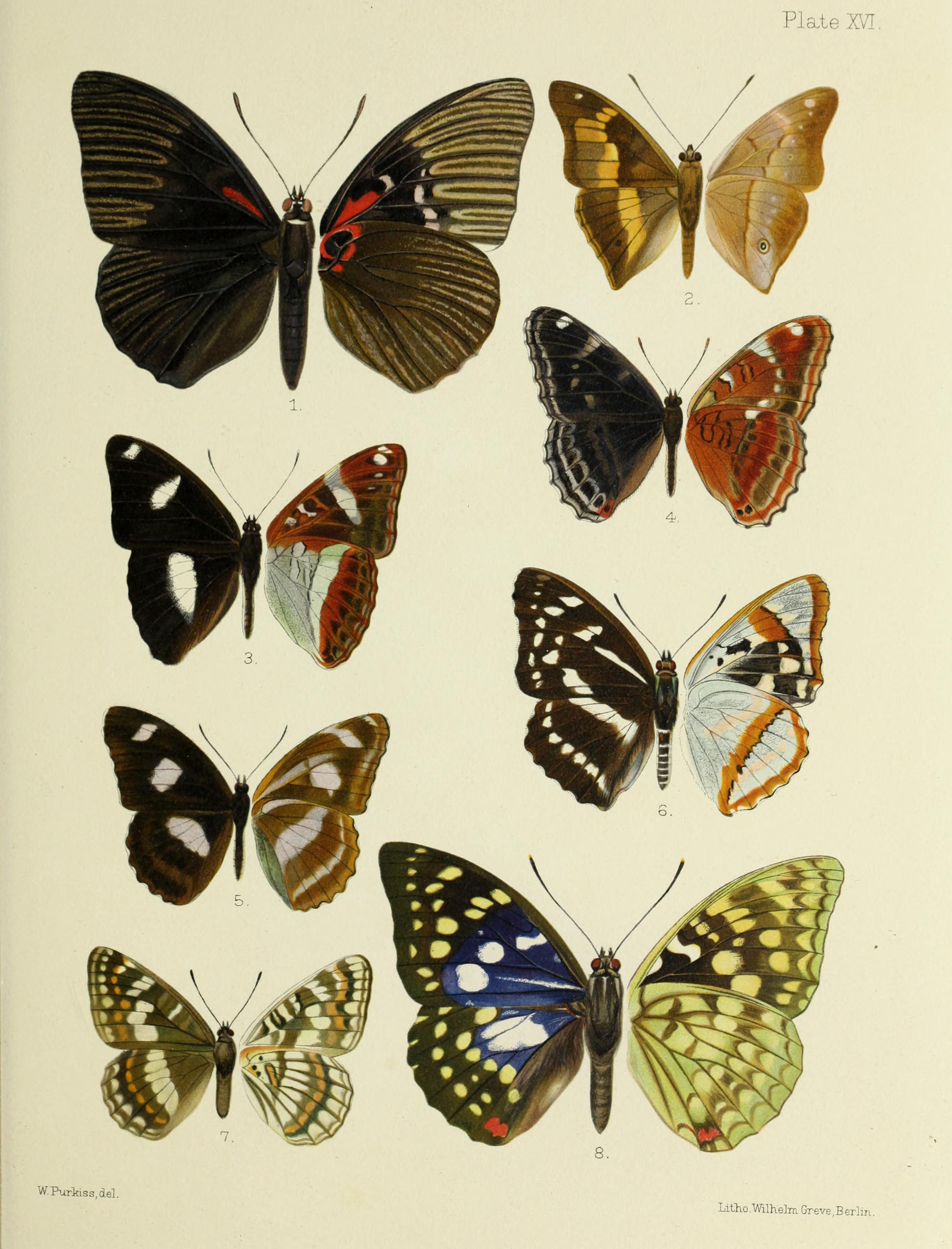
- Chalinga pratti in Leech, J. H., 1892–1893. Butterflies from China, Japan and Corea, fig. 7

Scientific classification
- Kingdom: Animalia
- Phylum: Arthropoda
- Class: Insecta
- Order: Lepidoptera
- Family: Nymphalidae
- Genus: Chalinga
- Species: C. pratti

Binomial name
- Chalinga pratti (Leech, 1890)

= Chalinga pratti =

Species of butterfly

Chalinga pratti is an East Palearctic butterfly in the family Nymphalidae (Limenitidinae).

It is found in Ussuri (S. p. eximia (Moltrecht, 1909)), China (nominate) and Korea (S. p. coreana (Matsumura, 1927)).

The larva on feeds on Pinus koraienis.
