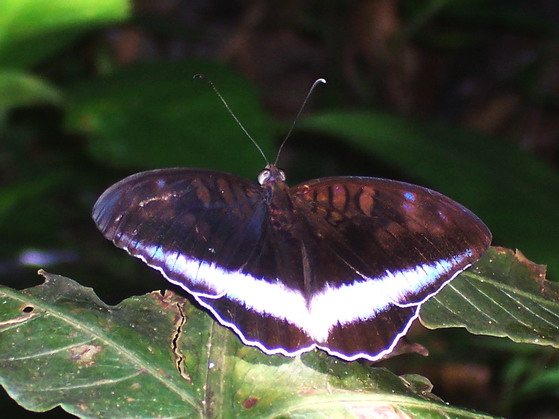
- Tanaecia iapis (Adoliadini)

Scientific classification
- Kingdom: Animalia
- Phylum: Arthropoda
- Clade: Pancrustacea
- Class: Insecta
- Order: Lepidoptera
- Family: Nymphalidae
- Subfamily: Limenitidinae; Behr, 1864

Tribes
- Adoliadini; Limenitidini; Neptini; Parthenini

= Limenitidinae =

Subfamily of butterfly family Nymphalidae

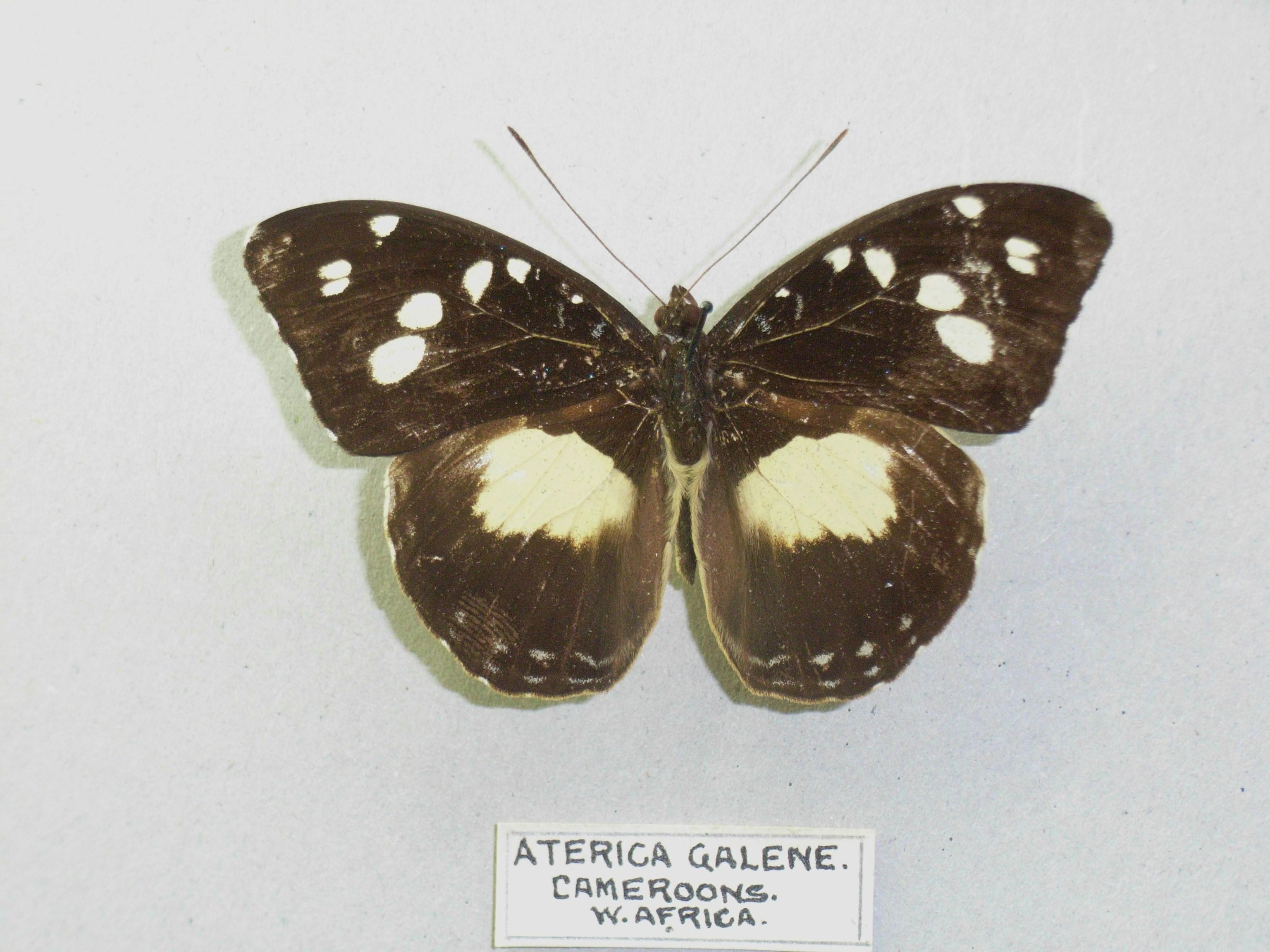
Aterica galene specimen (Adoliadini)

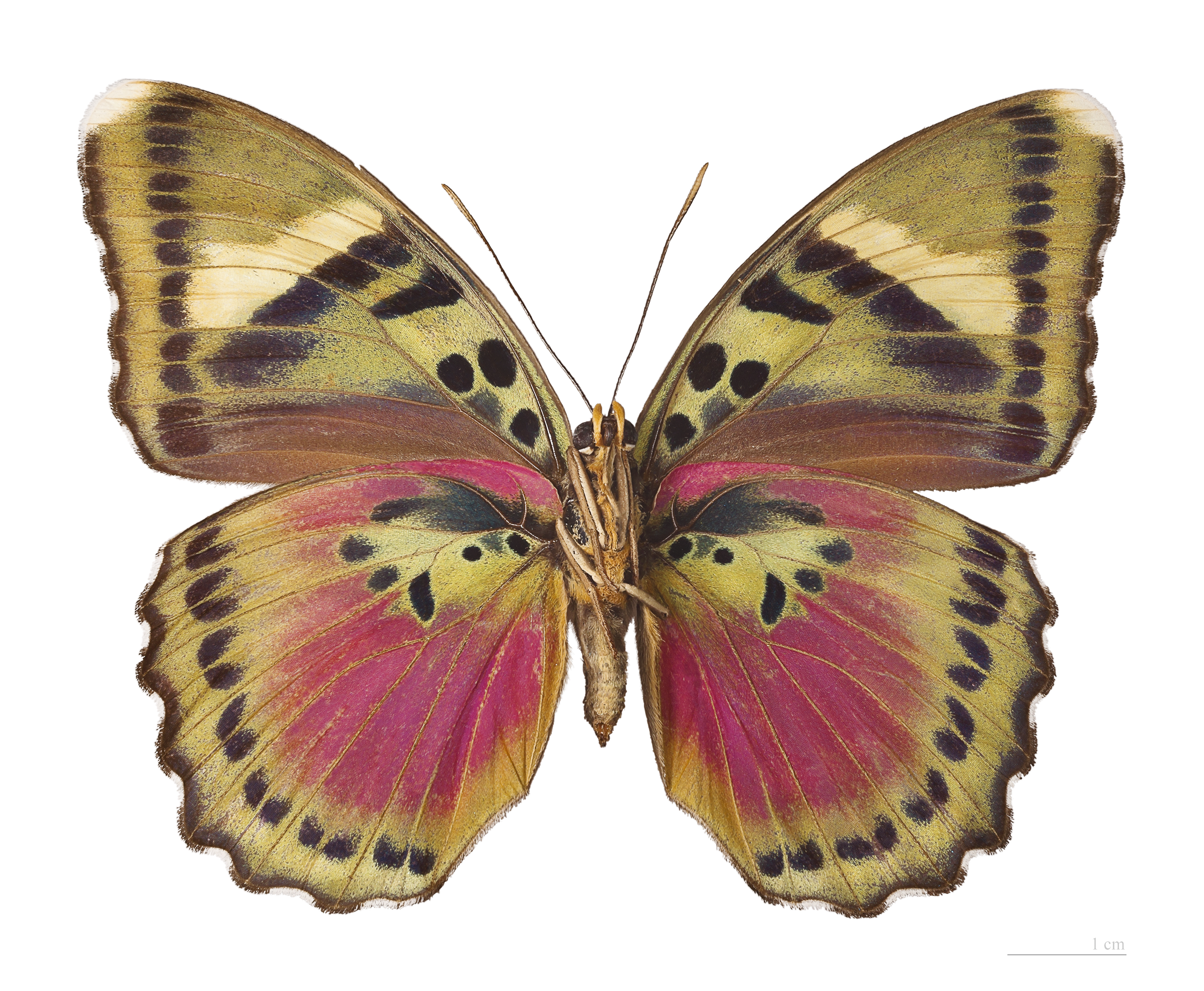
Euphaedra xypete (Adoliadini)

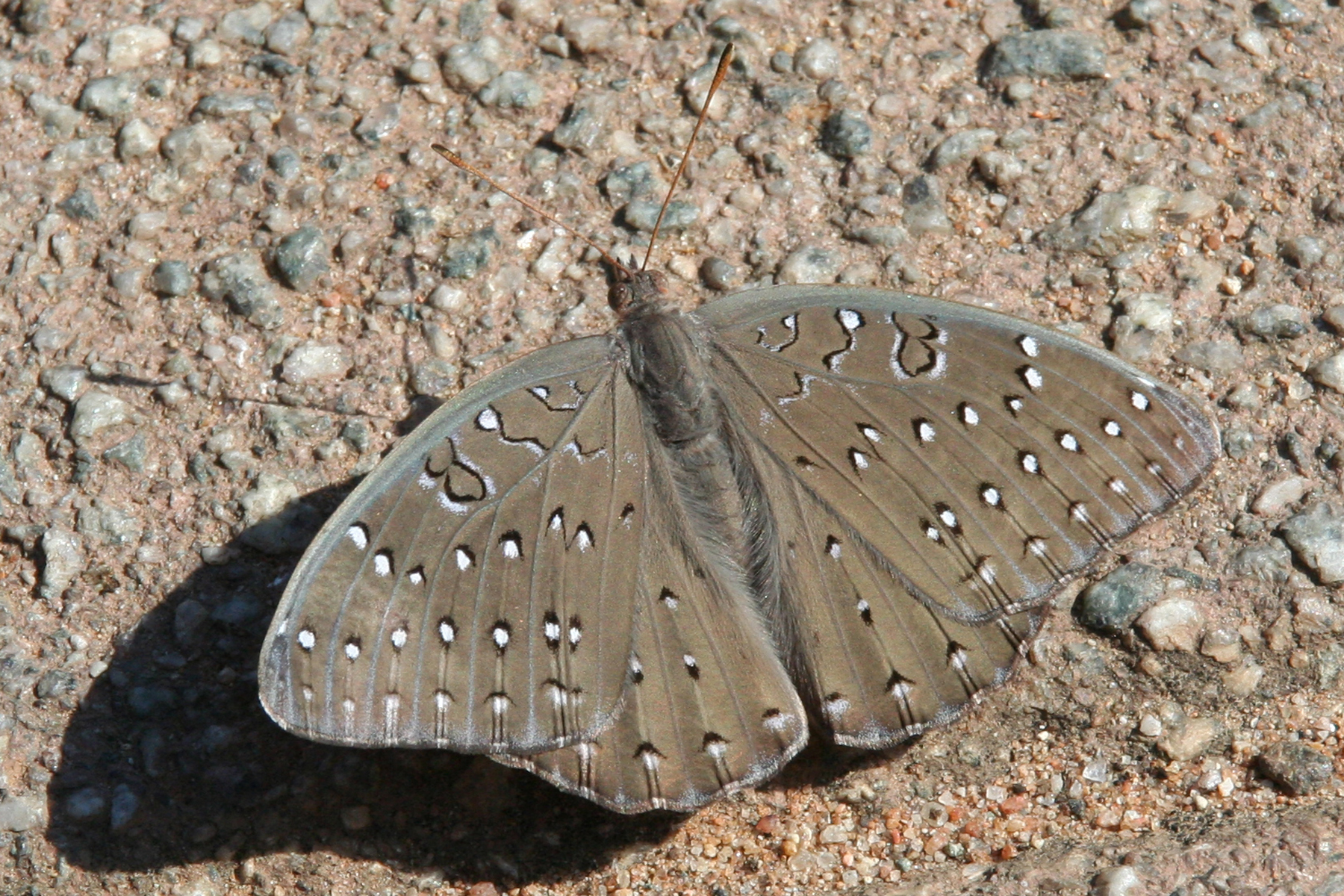
Hamanumida daedalus (Adoliadini)

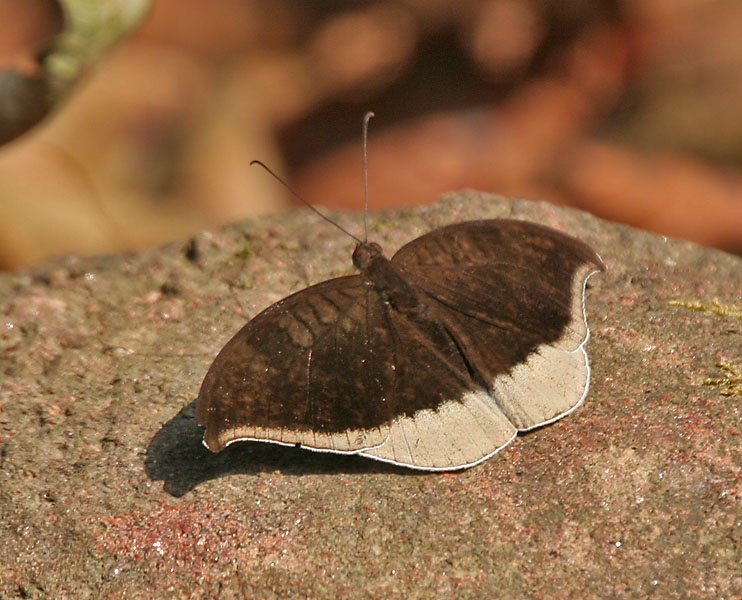
Tanaecia lepidea - grey count from (Adoliadini)

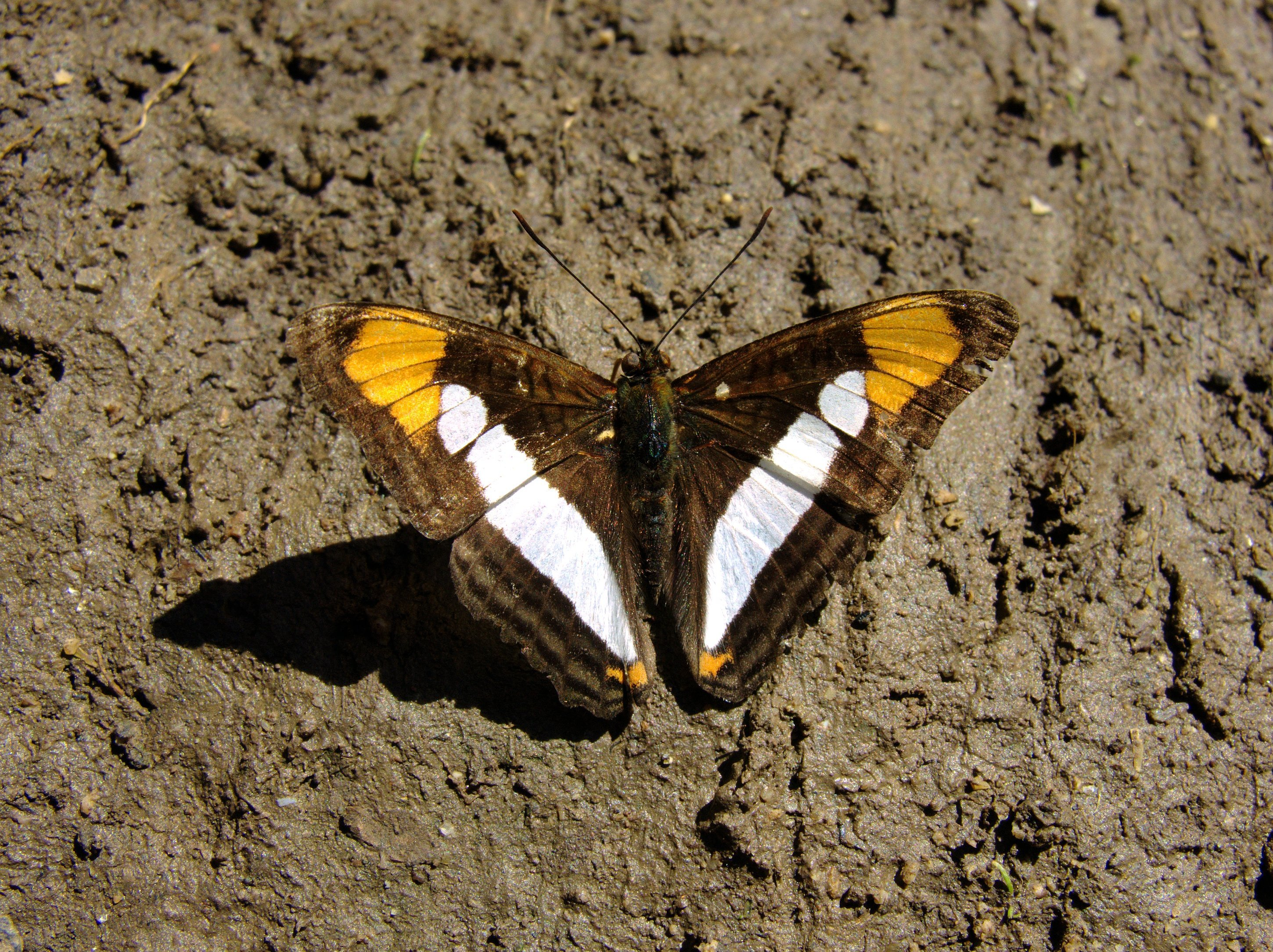
Adelpha syma of the Limenitidini is sometimes placed in Limenitis

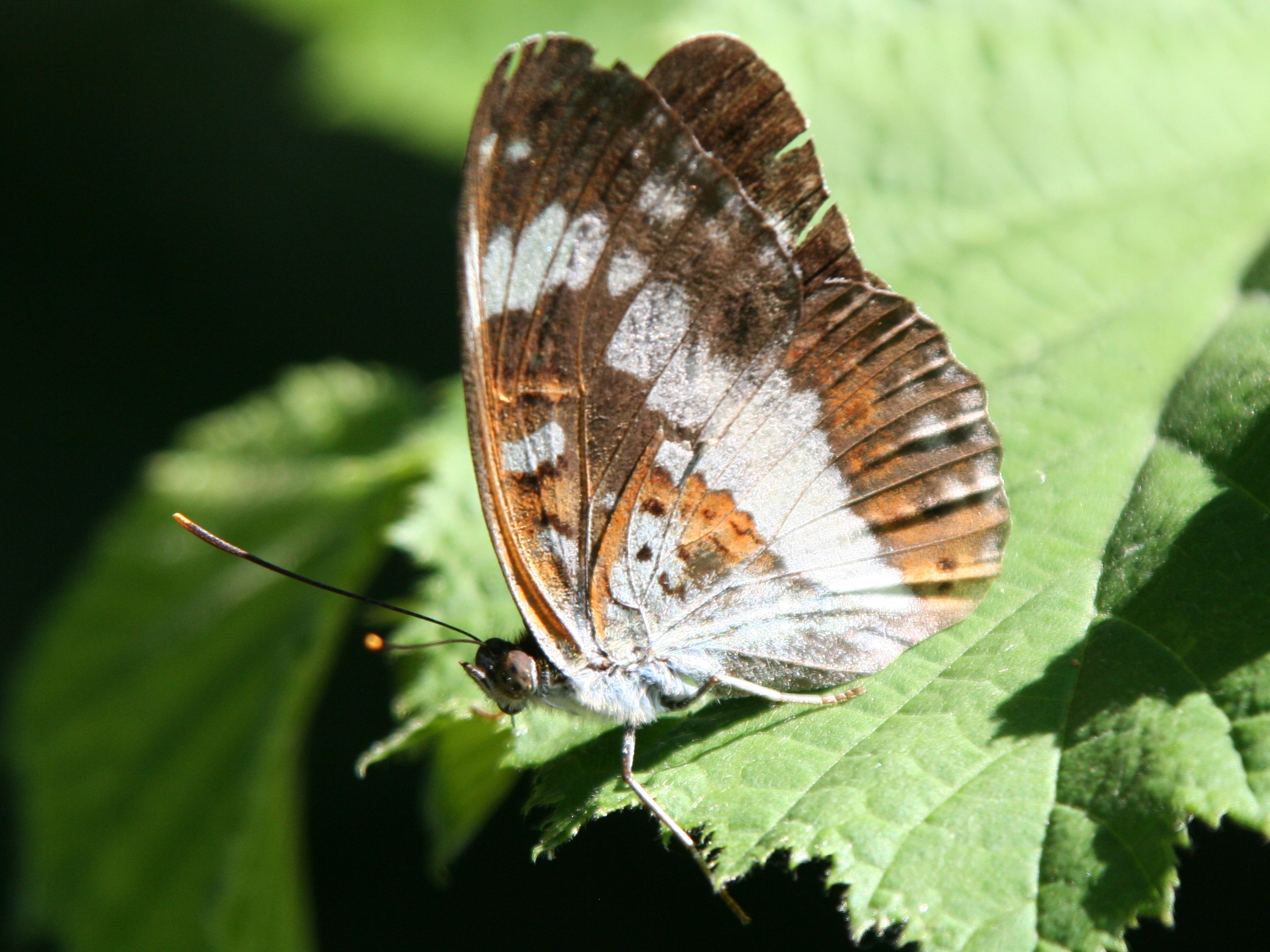
Eurasian white admiral (Limenitis camilla: Limenitidini)

The Limenitidinae are a subfamily of butterflies that includes the admirals and relatives. The common names of many species and genera reference military ranks or – namely the Adoliadini – titles of nobility (e.g., count, duke, earl, and marquis), in reference to these butterflies' large size, bold patterns, and dashing flight. In particular, the light stripe running lengthwise across the wings of many Limenitidini has reminded earlier authors of military and naval officers' shoulder insignia.

In flight, many of these butterflies have the habit of flapping their wings, so the (usually) bright upperside and the cryptic underside alternate for the observer, then gliding for prolonged distances, with the motionless wings held outstretched. The common names of some Limenitidinae – "aeroplanes", "clippers", or "gliders" – refer to this flight pattern.

== Systematics ==
The Biblidinae are sometimes merged here. The present subfamily is also sometimes included as a tribe Limenitidini in the Nymphalinae. But in fact, their closest living relatives seem to be the Heliconiinae.

The Limenitidinae are traditionally divided into four tribes, of which the Parthenini is sister to the other three, which form a close-knit and more apomorphic radiation. While this basic layout is likely to be fairly correct, a few genera cannot be easily assigned to the three "modern" tribes and seem to be somewhat intermediate. In particular, the delimitation of the Limenitidini versus the Neptini is in need of more study.

=== Genera and selected species ===
The genera of Limenitidinae, sorted per tribe in the presumed phylogenetic sequence and with some species also listed, are:

Tribe Parthenini Reuter, 1896

- Bhagadatta Moore, [1898]
- Parthenos – clippers

Tribe Adoliadini Doubleday, 1845

- Abrota Moore, 1857
- Bassarona Moore, [1897] – marquises, dukes
  - Bassarona durga – blue duke
  - Bassarona iva – grand duke
  - Bassarona recta – redtail marquis
  - Bassarona teuta – banded marquis
- Dophla Moore, [1880] – dukes
  - Dophla evelina – redspot duke
- Euthalia – barons, dukes
- Euthaliopsis Neervoort van de Poll, 1896
- Lexias – archdukes
- Neurosigma Butler, 1868
- Tanaecia Butler, [1869] – counts
  - Tanaecia cocytus – lavender count
  - Tanaecia julii – common earl
  - Tanaecia lepidea – grey count
  - Tanaecia pelea – Malay viscount
- Aterica Boisduval, 1833 – forest-glade nymphs
- Bebearia Hemming, 1960
- Catuna Kirby, 1871 – pathfinders
- Crenidomimas Karsch, 1894
- Cynandra Schatz, [1887] – brilliant nymph
- Euphaedra Hübner, [1819] – typical foresters, figeaters
- Euptera Staudinger, [1891]
- Euriphene Boisduval, 1847
- Euryphaedra Staudinger, [1891]
- Euryphura Staudinger, [1891]
- Euryphurana Hecq, 1992 – noble commander
- Hamanumida Hübner, [1819] – guineafowl
- Harmilla Aurivillius, 1892 – elegant forester
- Pseudargynnis Karsch, 1892 – false fritillary
- Pseudathyma Staudinger, [1891] – false sergeants

Tribe Limenitidini Behr, 1864

- Adelpha Hübner, [1819] – sisters (sometimes included in Limenitis)
  - Adelpha basiloides
  - Adelpha bredowii – Mexico sister
  - Adelpha californica – California sister (formerly in A. bredowii)
  - Adelpha eulalia – Arizona sister (formerly in A. bredowii)
  - Adelpha fessonia – band-celled sister
- Auzakia Moore, [1898]
  - Auzakia danava – commodore
- Lelecella Hemming, 1939
- Limenitis – admirals
- Litinga Moore, [1898]
- Parasarpa Moore, [1898]
  - Parasarpa dudu – white commodore
  - Parasarpa zayla – bicolor commodore
- Patsuia Moore, [1898]
- Sumalia Moore, [1898]
  - Sumalia daraxa – green commodore
  - Sumalia zulema – scarce white commodore
- Moduza Moore, [1881] – commanders (sometimes included in Limenitis)
  - Moduza procris – commander
- Tarattia Moore, [1898]
- Athyma – sergeants
- Pandita Moore, 1857
- Tacola Moore, [1898]

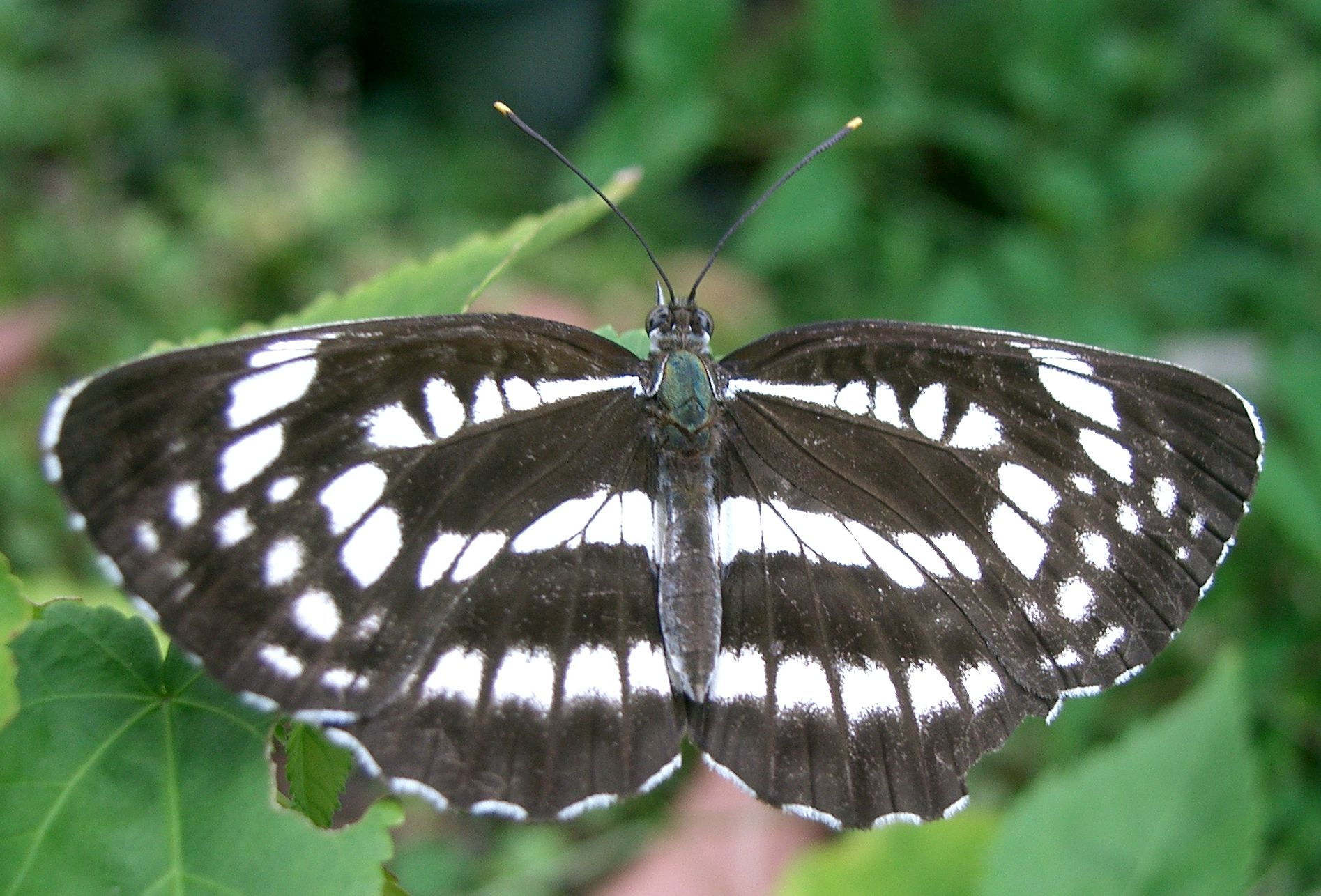
Neptis pryeri pryeri (Neptini)

Tribe Neptini Newman, 1870

- Aldania Moore, [1896]
- Lasippa Moore, [1898]
- Neptis – typical sailers
- Pandassana Moore, [1898] (might belong in Neptis)
- Pantoporia Hübner, [1819] – lascars
  - Pantoporia assamica – Assam lascar
  - Pantoporia bieti – Tytler's lascar
  - Pantoporia hordonia – common lascar
  - Pantoporia karwara – Karwar lascar
  - Pantoporia paraka – Perak lascar
  - Pantoporia sandaka – extra lascar
- Phaedyma Felder, 1861 – aeroplanes
  - Phaedyma shepherdi – common aeroplane

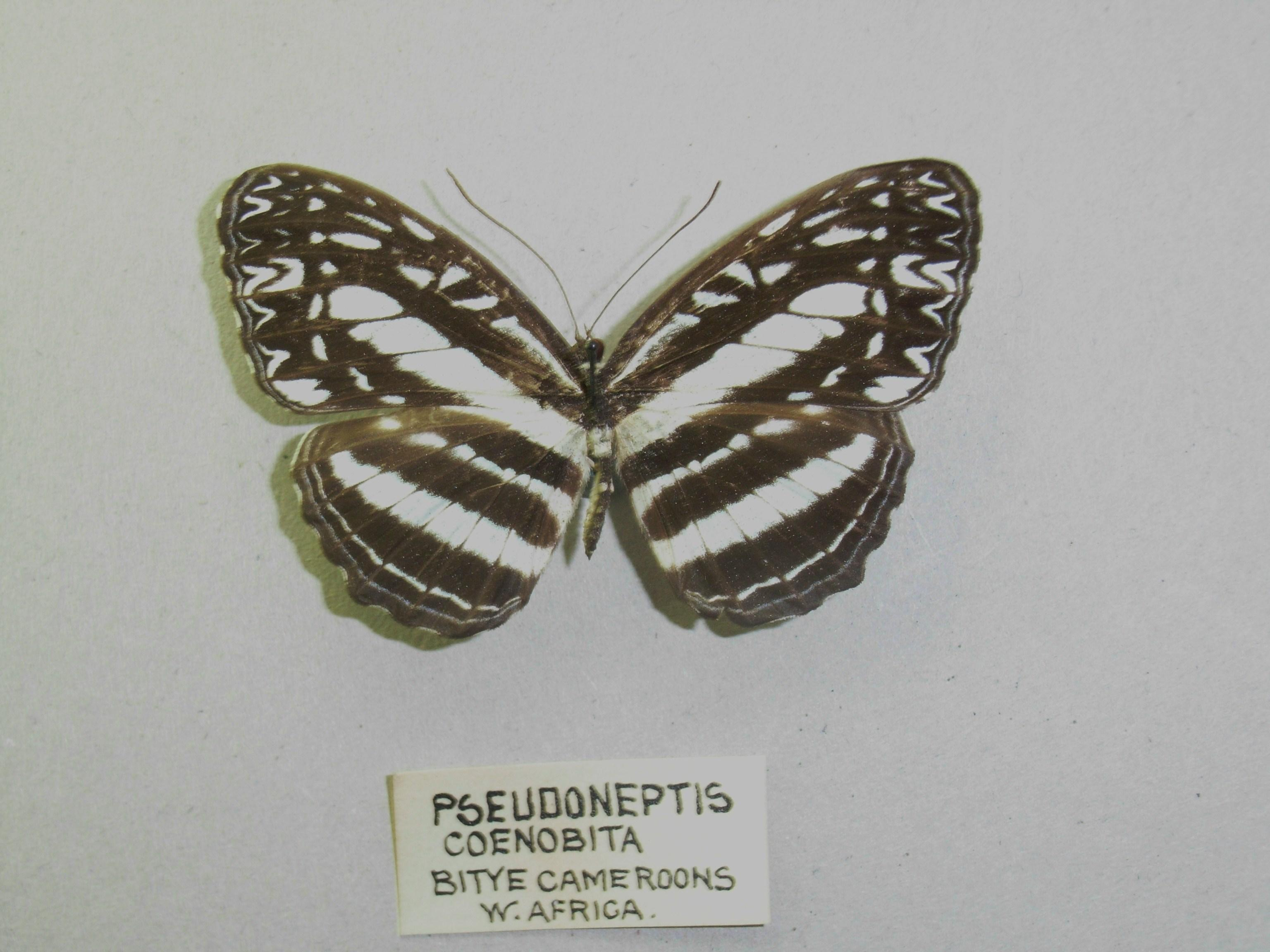
Pseuodoneptis coenobita is sometimes placed in the Limenitidini. It resembles Neptis species, but probably due to mimicry rather than parallel evolution

Incertae sedis

- Cymothoe Hübner, [1819] (Limenitidini or Neptini?) – typical gliders
  - Cymothoe caenis
  - Cymothoe hobarti – Hobart's red glider
  - Cymothoe sangaris
- Harma Doubleday, [1848] – angular glider (Limenitidini or Neptini?)
- Kumothales Overlaet, 1940 (Limenitidini?)
- Lamasia Moore, [1898] (Limenitidini?)
- Lebadea Felder, 1861 (Limenitidini or Parthenini?)
  - Lebadea martha – knight
- Pseudacraea – false acraeas (Limenitidini?)
- Pseudoneptis Snellen, 1882 – blue sailers (Limenitidini?)
- Chalinga Moore, 1898 (=Seokia Sibatani, 1943) (Limenitidini or Chalingini?)
