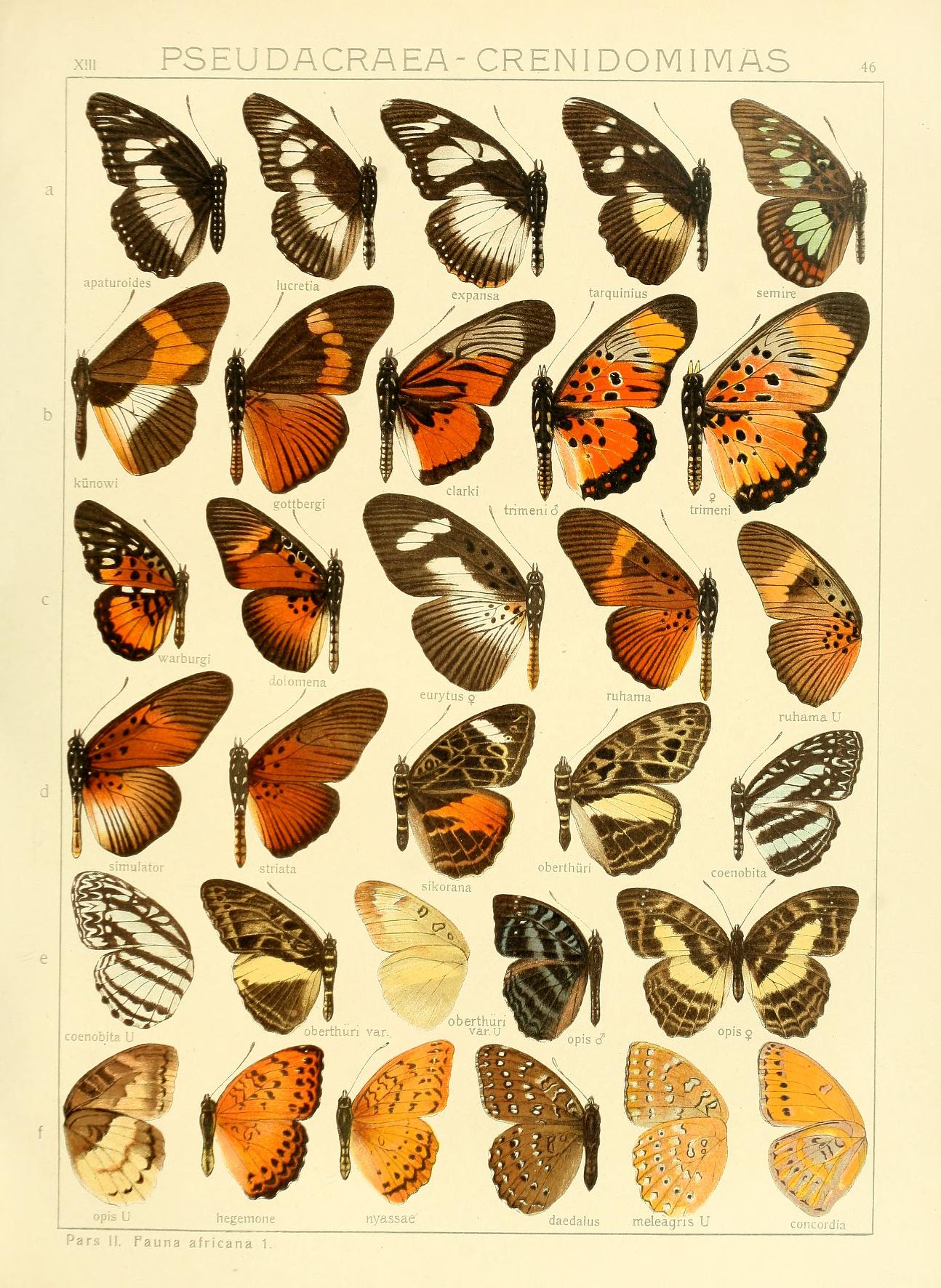
- Pseudargynnis hegemone and P. h. nyassae in Adalbert Seitz's Fauna Africana

Scientific classification
- Kingdom: Animalia
- Phylum: Arthropoda
- Clade: Pancrustacea
- Class: Insecta
- Order: Lepidoptera
- Family: Nymphalidae
- Subfamily: Limenitidinae
- Genus: Pseudargynnis; Karsch, 1892
- Species: P. hegemone

Binomial name
- Pseudargynnis hegemone (Godart, 1819)

Synonyms
- Argynnis hegemone Godart, 1819; Jaera duodecipunctata Snellen, 1872; Aterica clorana Druce, 1874; Pseudargynnis hegemone nyassae Bartel, 1905; Pseudargynnis hegemone ab. obscurata Grünberg, 1910; Pseudargynnis hegemone f. duplicata Riley, 1932

= Pseudargynnis =

Monotypic brush-footed butterfly genus

Pseudargynnis is a monotypic butterfly genus. The single species Pseudargynnis hegemone, the false fritillary, is a butterfly in the family Nymphalidae. It is found in eastern Nigeria, Cameroon, the Republic of the Congo, Angola, the southern part of the Democratic Republic of the Congo, southern Sudan, Uganda, Burundi, western Kenya, western Tanzania, Malawi, northern Zambia, Mozambique and Zimbabwe. The habitat consists of open grassy and marshy habitats in tropical savanna and open forests.

The larvae feed on Dissotis species (including D. denticulata) and possibly Antherotoma naudinii.
