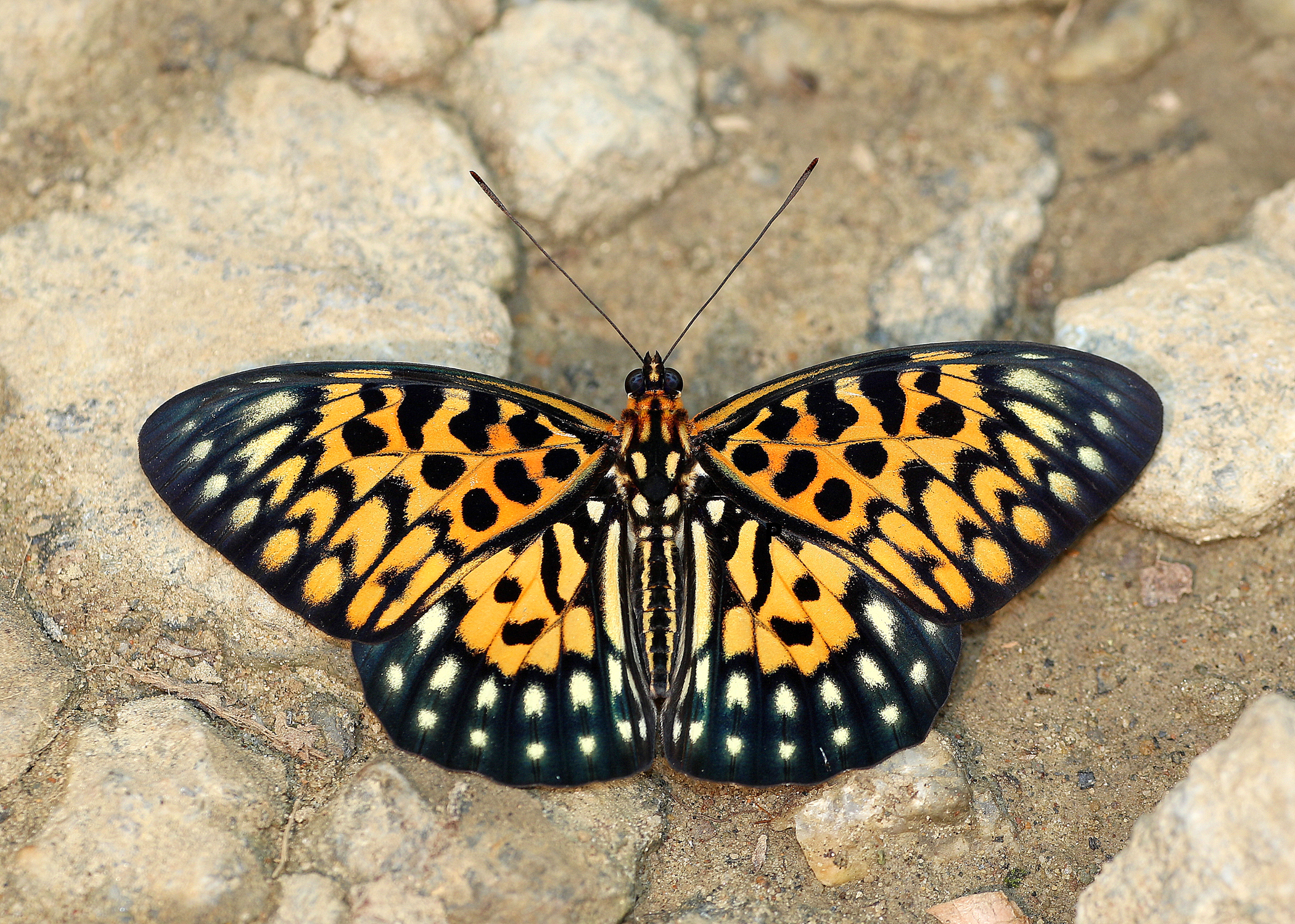

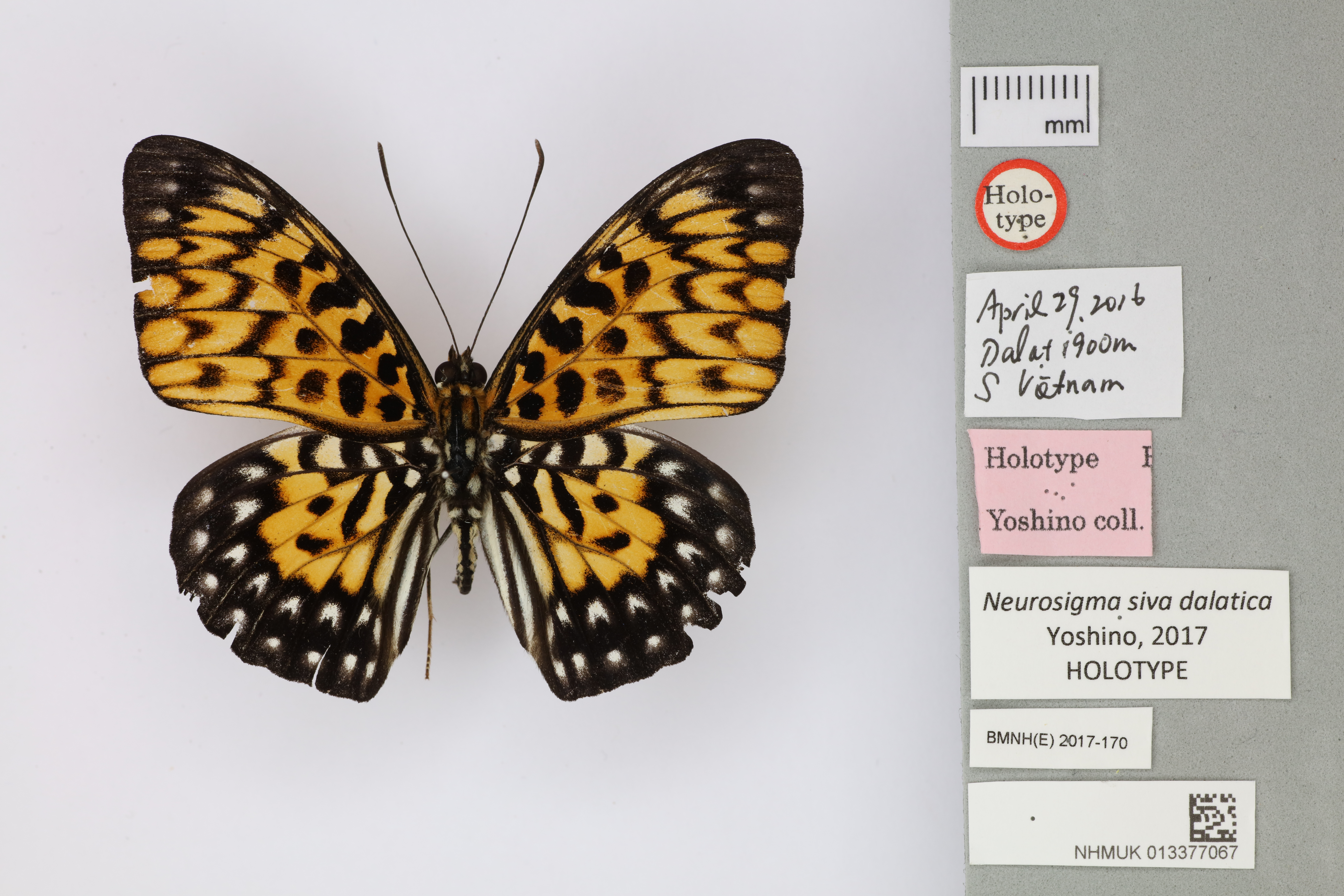

Scientific classification
- Kingdom: Animalia
- Phylum: Arthropoda
- Class: Insecta
- Order: Lepidoptera
- Family: Nymphalidae
- Tribe: Adoliadini
- Genus: Neurosigma; Butler, 1969
- Species: N. siva

Binomial name
- Neurosigma siva (Westwood, 1850)

Synonyms
- Neurosigma doubledayi; Neurosigma fraterna

= Neurosigma =

Panther

Monotypic brush-footed butterfly genus

Neurosigma is a monotypic butterfly genus in the family Nymphalidae. Its only species, Neurosigma siva, the panther or leopard, is found in Asia.

It is a large, quite unmistakable butterfly, the forewings are rounded triangular. The forewing and the inner part of the hindwing are orange with round, black spots and a black zigzag board in the outer part of the forewing. The outer part of the hindwing is black with two rows of square, whitish-yellow spots. Sometimes the base colour of the wings can be mostly white.
