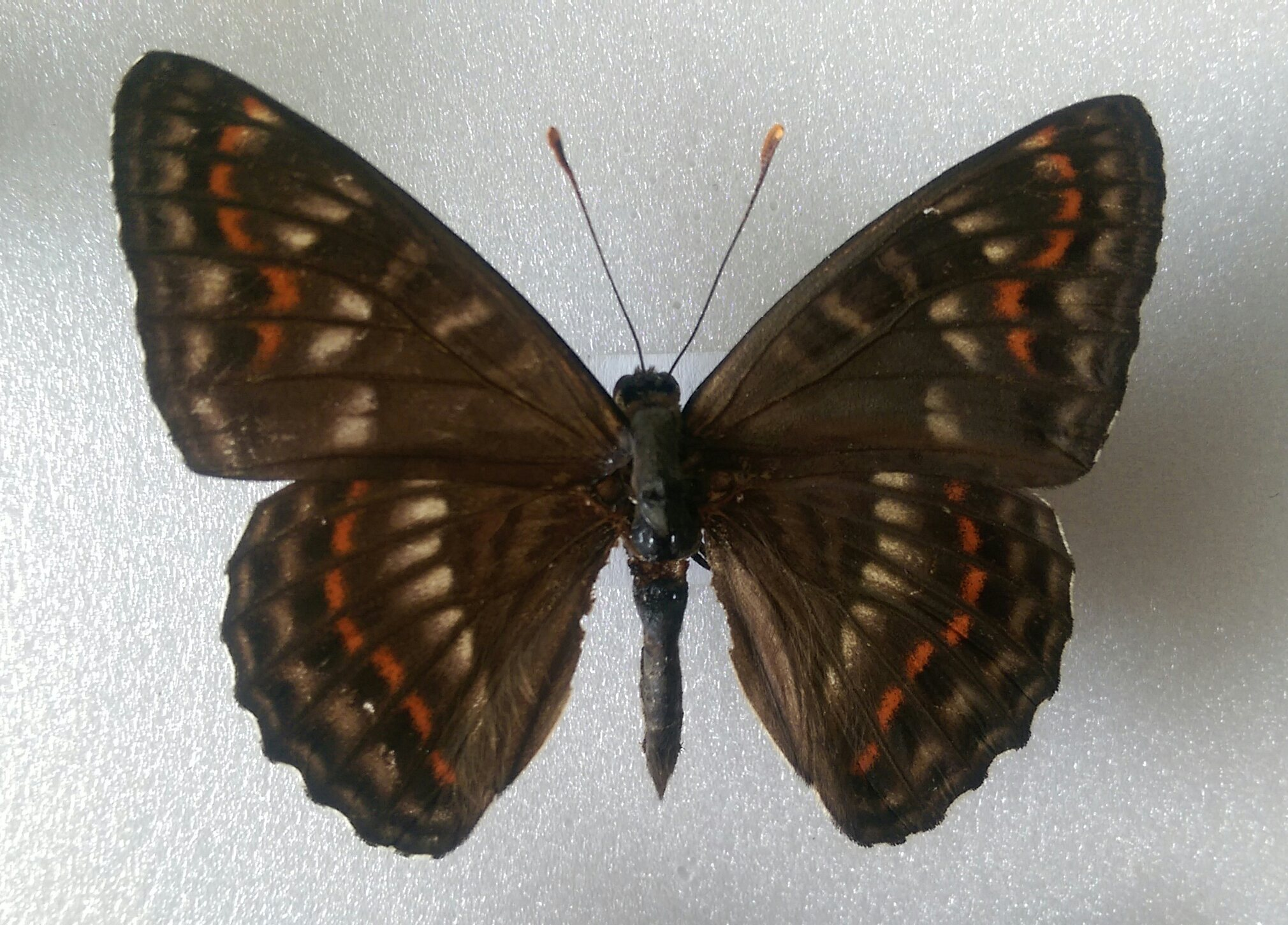
- Chalinga pratti

Scientific classification
- Domain: Eukaryota
- Kingdom: Animalia
- Phylum: Arthropoda
- Class: Insecta
- Order: Lepidoptera
- Family: Nymphalidae
- Subfamily: Limenitidinae
- Genus: Chalinga; Moore, [1898]

Synonyms
- Seokia Sibatani, 1943; Eolimenitis Kurentzov, 1950; Ussuriensia Nekrutenko, 1960

= Chalinga =

Genus of brush-footed butterflies

Chalinga is a genus of butterflies in the family Nymphalidae.

== Species ==
- Chalinga elwesi (Oberthür, 1883)
- Chalinga pratti (Leech, 1890)
- Chalinga puerensis Tshikolovets, 2017
