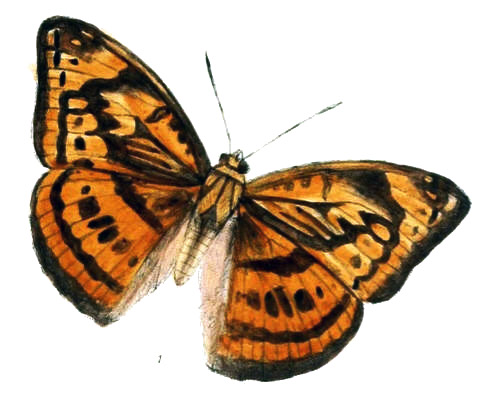

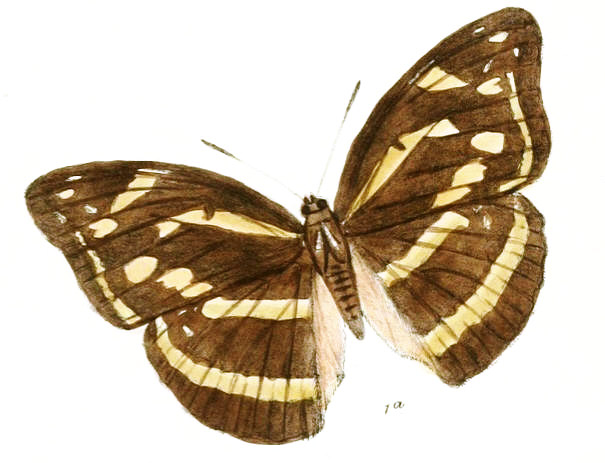

Scientific classification
- Kingdom: Animalia
- Phylum: Arthropoda
- Class: Insecta
- Order: Lepidoptera
- Family: Nymphalidae
- Subfamily: Limenitidinae
- Genus: Abrota Moore, 1857
- Species: A. ganga

Binomial name
- Abrota ganga Moore, 1857

Synonyms
- Abrota jumna Moore, [1866]; Abrota pratti Leech, 1891; Abrota pratti candidii Wileman, 1911

= Abrota ganga =

Sole species in brush-footed butterfly genus Abrota

Abrota ganga, the sergeant-major, is a species of butterfly in the family Nymphalidae.

== Range ==
It is found in Sikkim, Bhutan, Abor Hills, Naga Hills, Burma, western China (Sichuan, Yunnan), Taiwan, Guangdong and Shanxi.

In 1932 William Harry Evans described the species as not rare.

== Description ==
The sergeant-major is 70 to 90 mm in wingspan.

The male sergeant-major is tawny with dark bands. The upper hindwing has four bands, of which the central two are well-separated in the wet-season form and nearly united in the dry-season form.

The female is dark brown with dusky tawny bands. The upper forewing has a streak in the cell with a spot beyond while the upper hindwing has two tawny bands.

== Subspecies ==
- Abrota ganga ganga (Bhutan, Sikkim, Assam, Burma, Metok)
- Abrota ganga formosana Fruhstorfer, 1909 (Taiwan)
- Abrota ganga flavina Mell, 1923 (China: Guangdong)
- Abrota ganga pratti Leech, 1891 (western China: Sichuan, Yunnan)
- Abrota ganga riubaensis Yoshino, 1997 (China: Shaanxi)

== See also ==
- List of butterflies of India (Limenitidinae)
