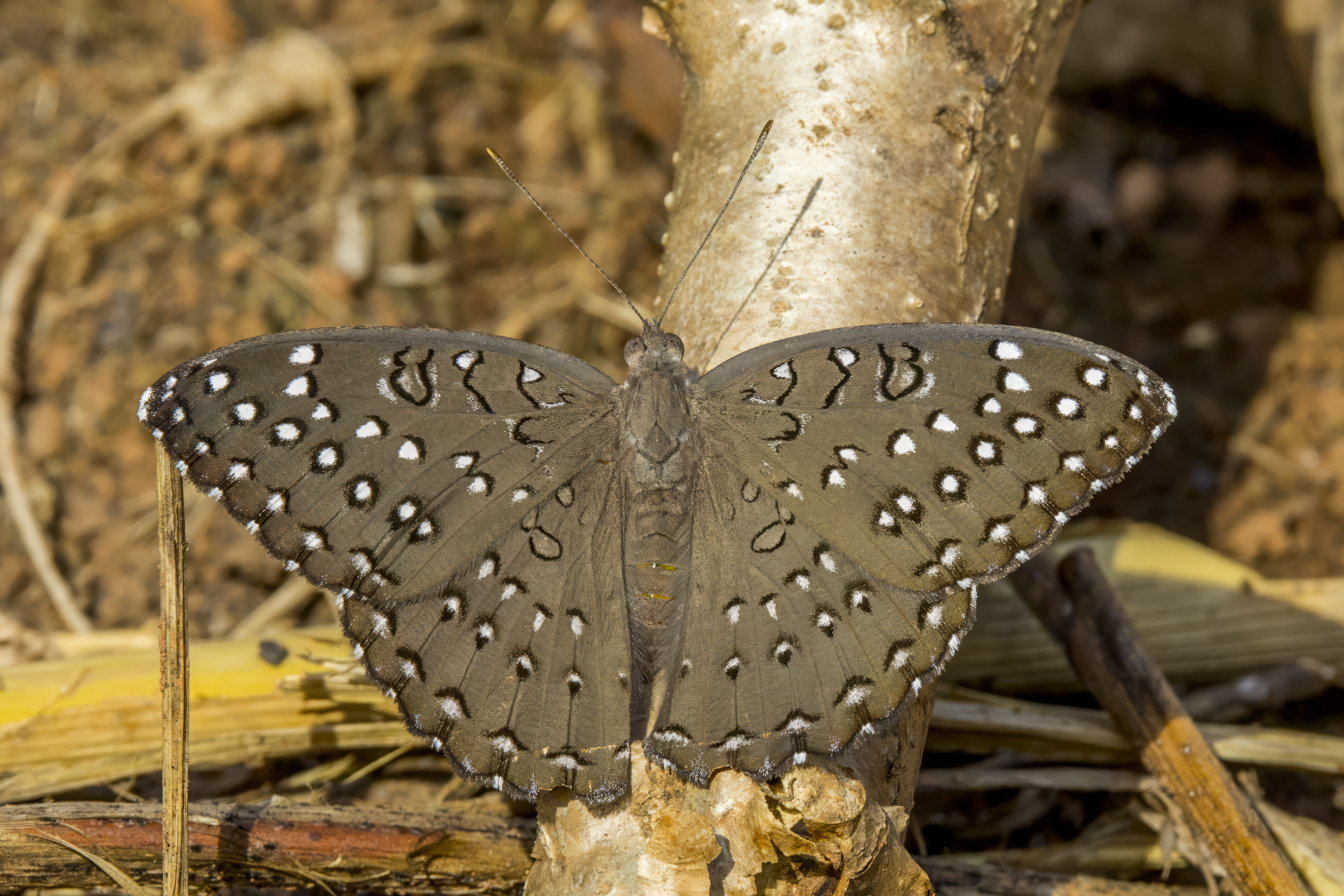

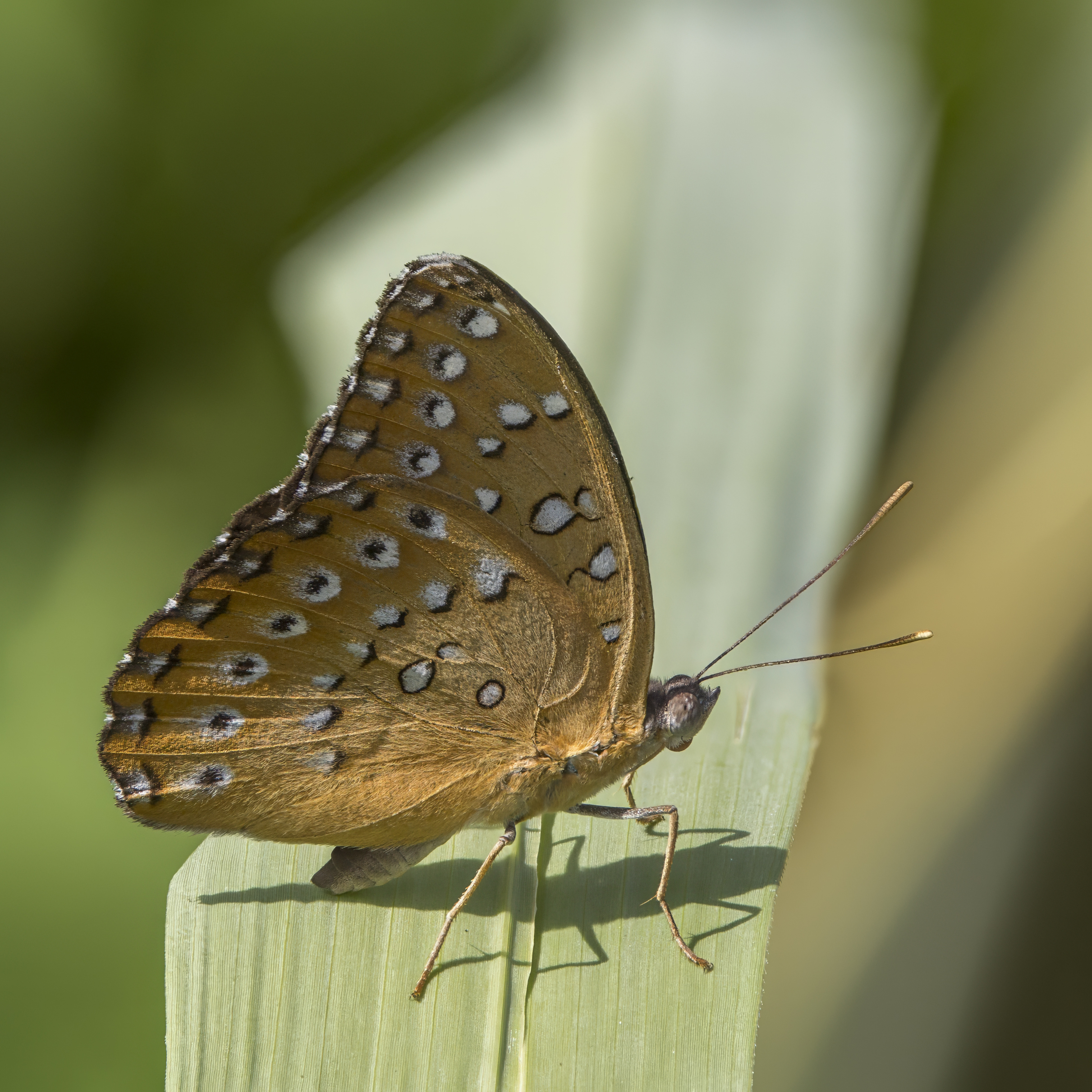
- both are males in Ghana

Scientific classification
- Kingdom: Animalia
- Phylum: Arthropoda
- Clade: Pancrustacea
- Class: Insecta
- Order: Lepidoptera
- Family: Nymphalidae
- Subfamily: Limenitidinae
- Genus: Hamanumida; Hübner, 1819
- Species: H. daedalus

Binomial name
- Hamanumida daedalus (Fabricius, 1775)

Synonyms
- Genus: Canopus Felder, 1861; Leucotricha Rothschild & Jordan, 1903; Species: Papilio daedalus Fabricius, 1775; Papilio meleagris Cramer, [1775]; Papilio melantha Fabricius, 1775; Papilio hesperus Fabricius, 1793; Aterica meleagris (Cramer, [1775]); Hamanumida daedalus var. meleagrina Staudinger, 1886; Hamanumida daedalus f. bicolor Ungemach, 1932; Hamanumida daedalus f. icarus Stoneham, 1965

= Hamanumida daedalus =

Sole species in brush-footed butterfly genus Hamanumida

Hamanumida daedalus, the guineafowl butterfly, is a butterfly of the family Nymphalidae and only member of the genus Hamanumida.

== Range ==
It is found in the Afrotropical realm (Natal, Eswatini, Transvaal, Mozambique, Zimbabwe, Botswana, tropical Africa (dry lowland areas) and southwest Arabia).

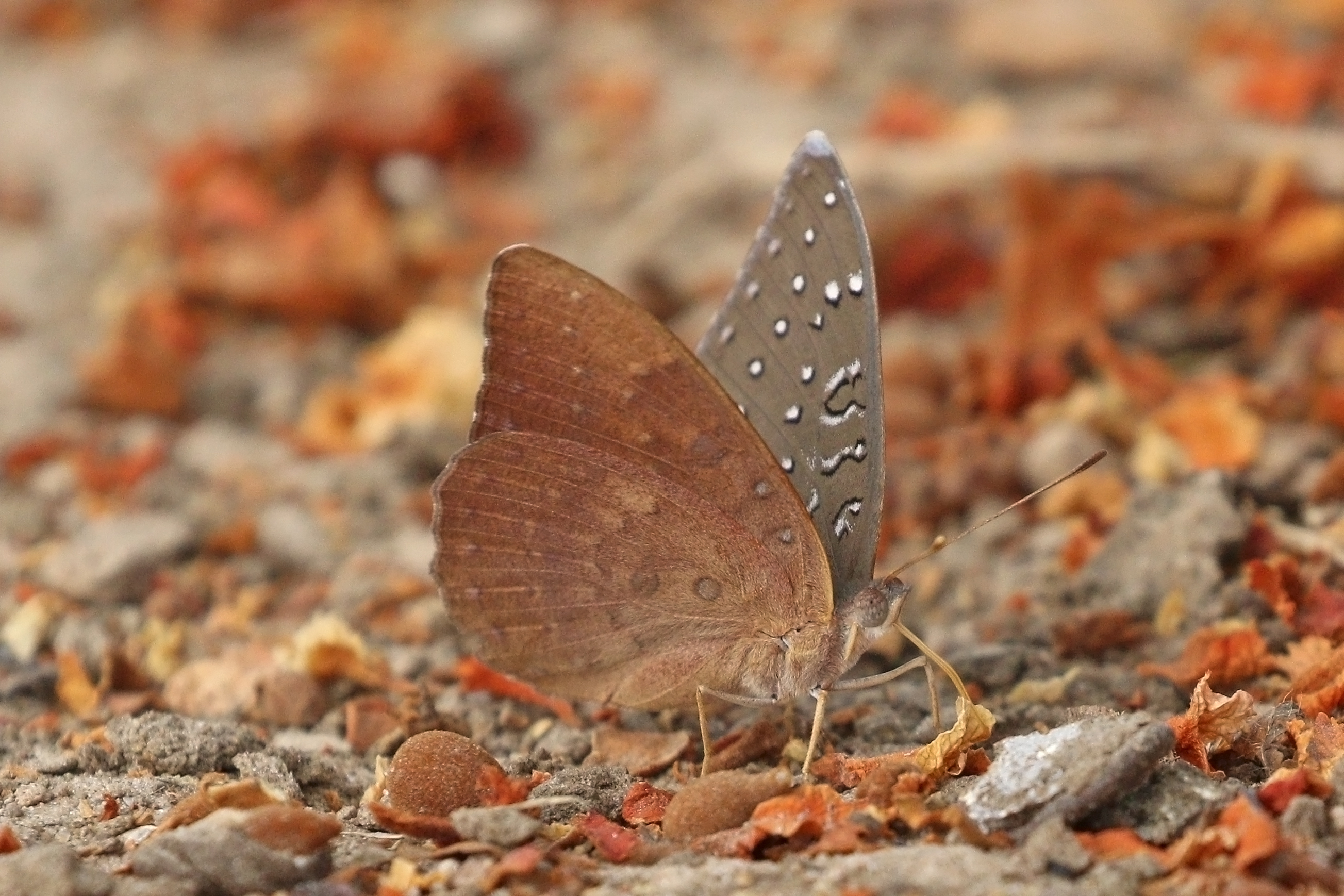
Finding nectar on fallen flowers, Senegal

Torben Larsen developed a species numbering system for his 2005 publication Butterflies of West Africa. This species is #951. The 'Larsen' numbers have since been used with permission in A Sharp Eye on Butterflies of Ghana.

== Description ==
The wingspan is 55–65 mm for males and 60–78 mm for females. Adults are on wing year-round, with peaks in midwinter and summer.

== Food plants ==
The larvae feed on Combretum and Terminalia species.
