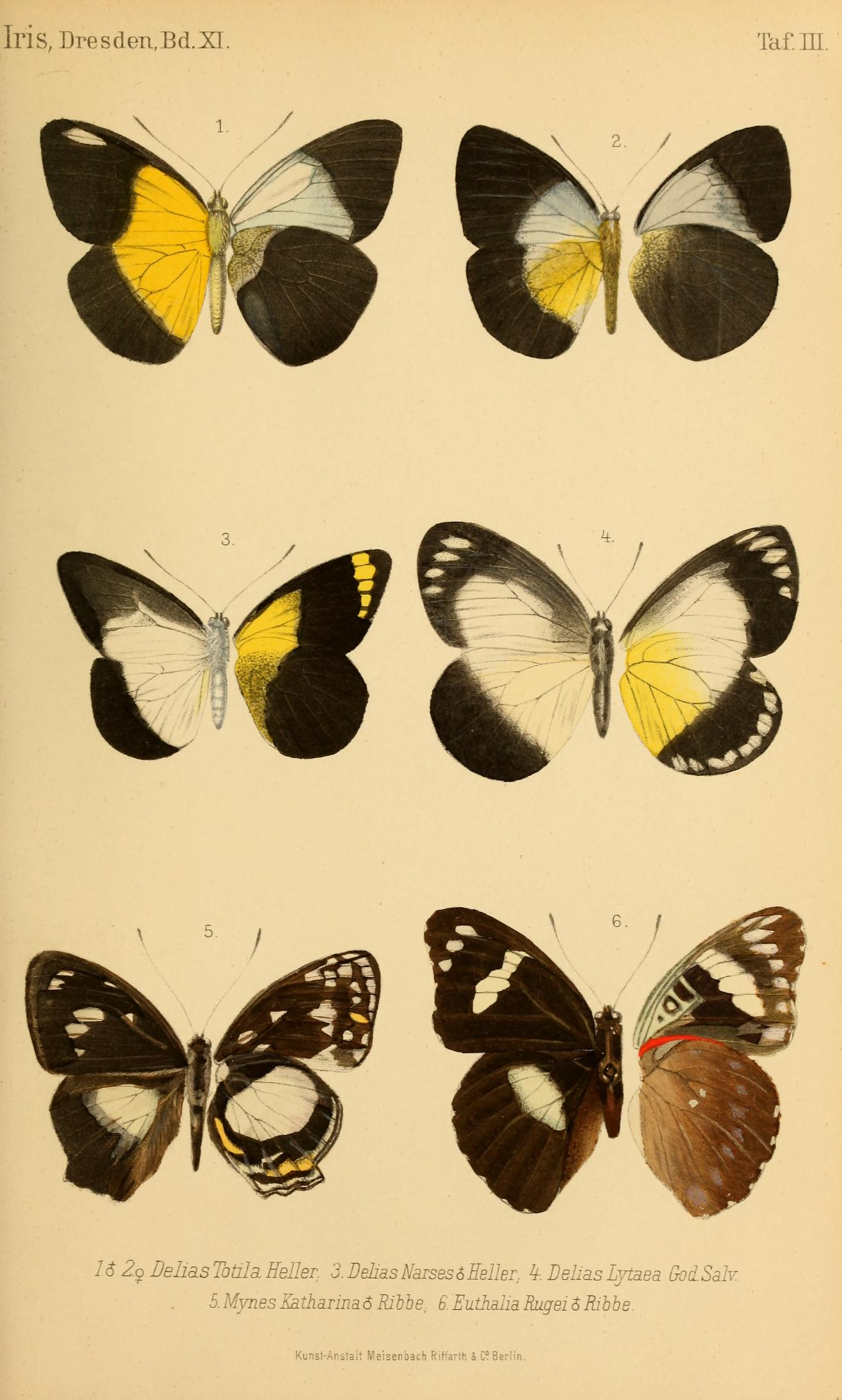
- Euthaliopsis aetion rugei (Ribbe, 1898) in Deutsche Entomologische Zeitschrift

Scientific classification
- Domain: Eukaryota
- Kingdom: Animalia
- Phylum: Arthropoda
- Class: Insecta
- Order: Lepidoptera
- Family: Nymphalidae
- Tribe: Adoliadini
- Genus: Euthaliopsis; Neervoort van de Poll, 1896

= Euthaliopsis =

Genus of butterflies

Euthaliopsis is a monotypic genus erected by Jacob R. H. Neervoort van de Poll in 1896. The single contained species is Euthaliopsis aetion (Hewitson, 1862) which feeds on Calophyllum as a larva.

The subspecies of Euthaliopsis aetion are:

- E. a. aetion Aru
- E. a. plateni (Staudinger, 1886) Bachan
- E. a. thieli (Ribbe, 1898) New Guinea
- E. a. rugei (Ribbe, 1898) New Hanover, New Ireland
- E. a. donata Fruhstorfer, 1906 Waigeu, Biak, Noemfoor
- E. a. philomena Fruhstorfer, 1906 New Guinea
- E. a. sosisthenes (Fruhstorfer, 1913) Papua, Woodlark, Yela Island
- E. a. mysolensis (Talbot, 1932) Mysol
- E. a. halmaherensis Yokochi, 1995 Halmahera
