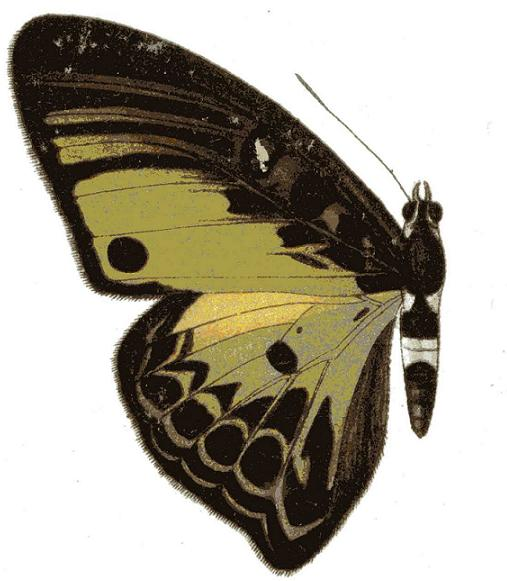

Scientific classification
- Domain: Eukaryota
- Kingdom: Animalia
- Phylum: Arthropoda
- Class: Insecta
- Order: Lepidoptera
- Family: Nymphalidae
- Tribe: Adoliadini
- Genus: Euryphaedra; Staudinger, 1891
- Species: E. thauma

Binomial name
- Euryphaedra thauma Staudinger, 1891

= Euryphaedra =

Monotypic brush-footed butterfly genus

Euryphaedra is a butterfly genus in the family Nymphalidae. It contains only one species, Euryphaedra thauma, which is found in Cameroon and Gabon.
