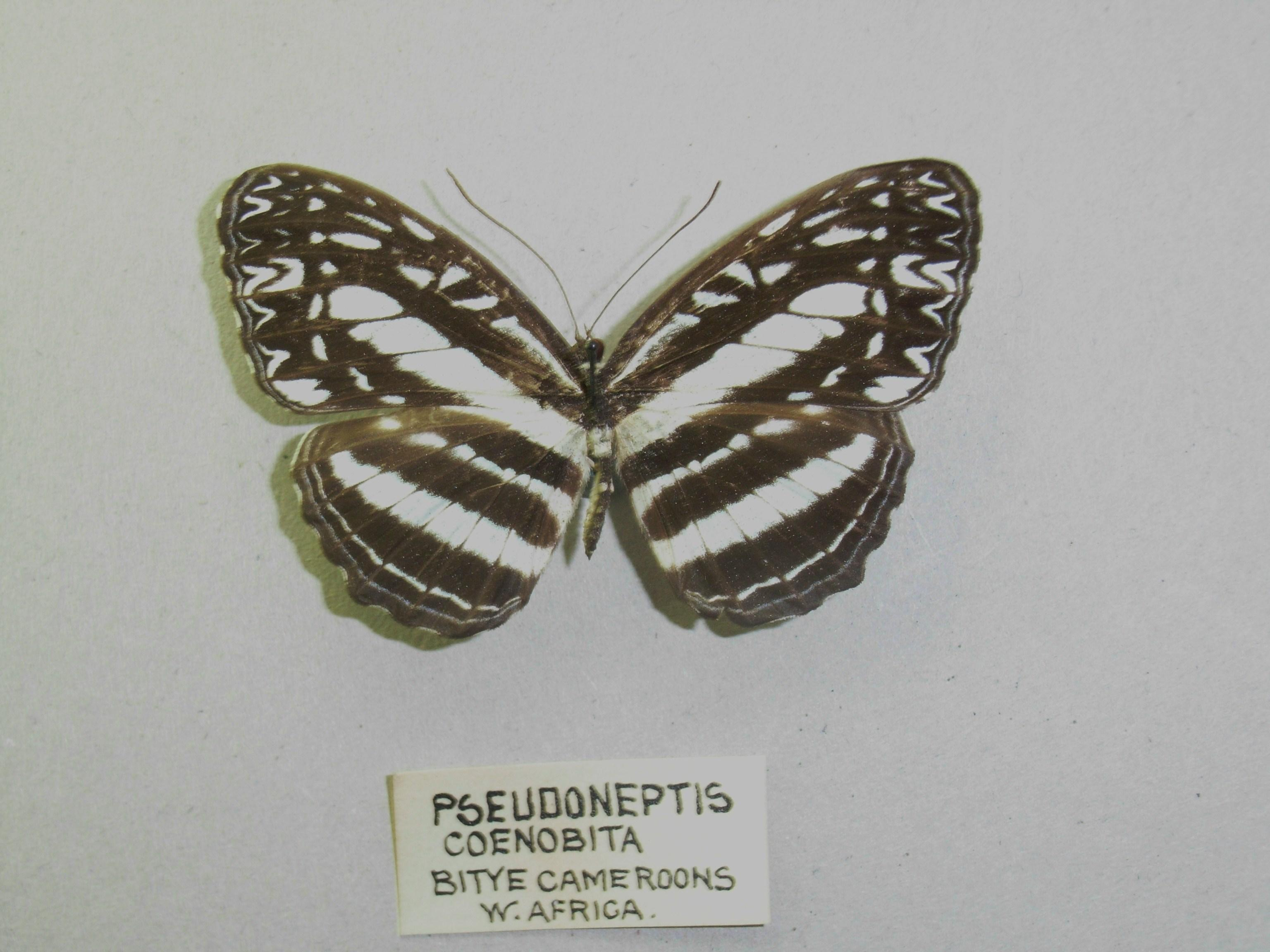

Scientific classification
- Kingdom: Animalia
- Phylum: Arthropoda
- Clade: Pancrustacea
- Class: Insecta
- Order: Lepidoptera
- Family: Nymphalidae
- Tribe: Limenitidini
- Genus: Pseudoneptis; Snellen, 1882
- Species: P. bugandensis

Binomial name
- Pseudoneptis bugandensis Stoneham, 1935

Synonyms
- Pseudoneptis coenobita bugandensis Stoneham, 1935; Papilio coenobita Fabricius, 1793

= Pseudoneptis =

Monotypic brush-footed butterfly genus

Pseudoneptis is a butterfly genus in the family Nymphalidae. It contains only one species Pseudoneptis bugandensis, the blue sailer or blue sergeant. It is found in Guinea, Sierra Leone, Liberia, Ivory Coast, Ghana, Togo, Nigeria, Cameroon, the Republic of the Congo, the Central African Republic, Angola, the Democratic Republic of the Congo, Uganda, Kenya, Sudan, Tanzania and Zambia. The habitat consists of forest with a canopy, including dry and disturbed forests.

The larvae possibly feed on Antiaris toxicaria, Ritchiea capparioides, Antiaris africana and Ficus species (including F. asperifolia).

== Subspecies ==
- Pseudoneptis bugandensis bugandensis (eastern Uganda, western Kenya, southern Sudan, north-western Tanzania)
- Pseudoneptis bugandensis ianthe Hemming, 1964 (Guinea, Sierra Leone, Liberia, Ivory Coast, Ghana, Togo, Nigeria, Cameroon, Congo, Central African Republic, Angola, Democratic Republic of the Congo, western Uganda, Zambia)

Torben Larsen developed a species numbering system for his 2005 publication Butterflies of West Africa. The subspecies ianthe is #879. The 'Larsen' numbers have since been used with permission in A Sharp Eye on Butterflies of Ghana.
