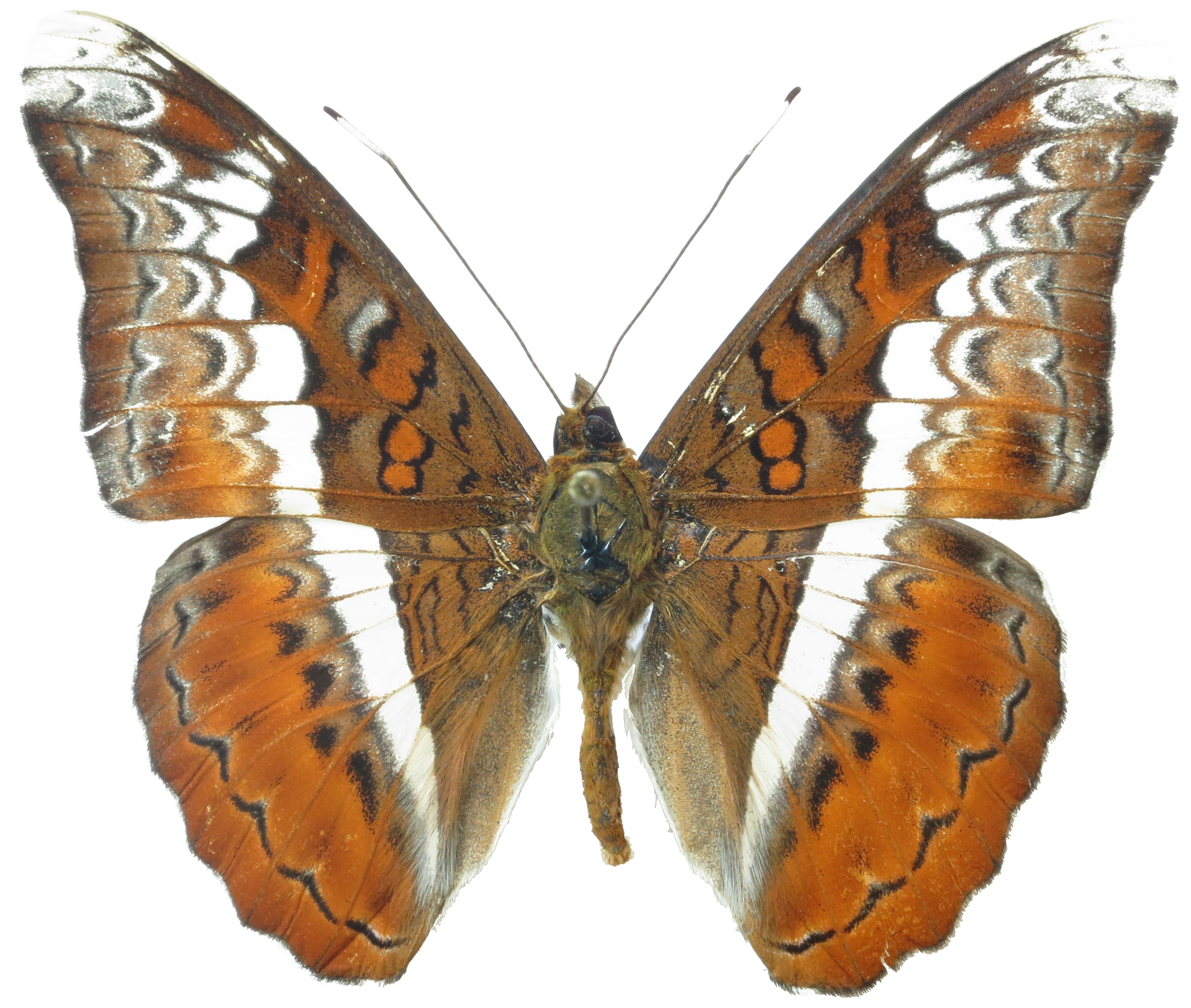
- Lebadea martha martha, Lâm Đồng, Vietnam

Scientific classification
- Domain: Eukaryota
- Kingdom: Animalia
- Phylum: Arthropoda
- Class: Insecta
- Order: Lepidoptera
- Family: Nymphalidae
- Genus: Lebadea
- Species: L. martha

Binomial name
- Lebadea martha (Fabricius, 1787)

= Lebadea martha =

Knight

Species of butterfly

Lebadea martha, the knight, is a species of nymphalid butterfly found in tropical and subtropical Asia.

== Subspecies ==
Listed alphabetically.

- L. m. attenuata Moore, 1878 (Burma)
- L. m. distincta Corbet, 1942 (Mentawai Islands)
- L. m. ismene (Doubleday, [1848])
- L. m. malayana Fruhstorfer, 1902 – knight
- L. m. martha Cambodia
- L. m. moorei Hall, 1930
- L. m. natuna Fruhstorfer, 1902 (Natuna Islands)
- L. m. nebula Chou, Zhang & Xie, 2000
- L. m. paduka (Moore, 1857) (northern Borneo)
- L. m. parkeri Eliot, 1978 (Singapore)
- L. m. sumatrensis Staudinger, 1886 (Sumatra)
- L. m. wallacei Moore, 1898 (south-western Sumatra)

== Gallery ==
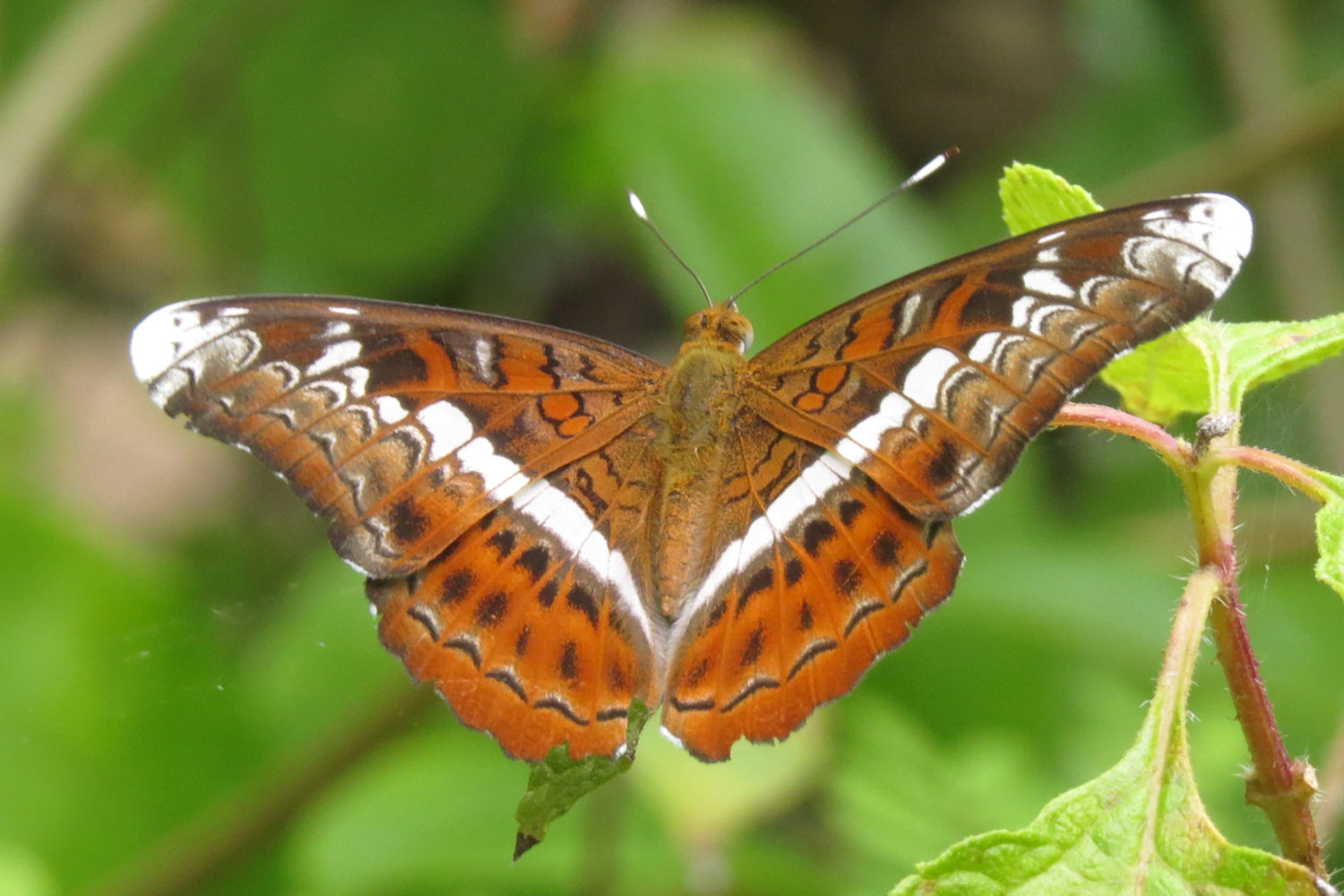

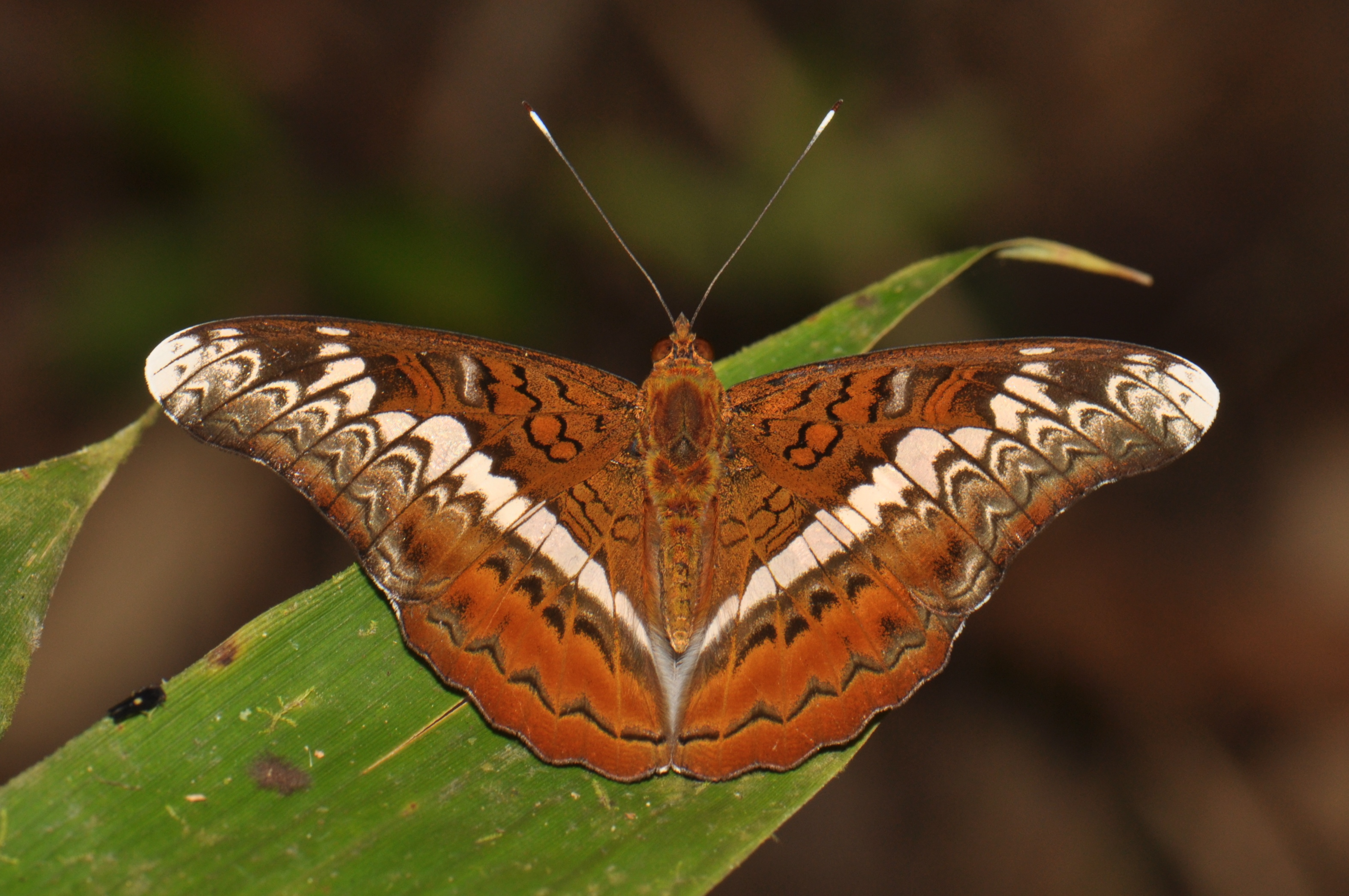

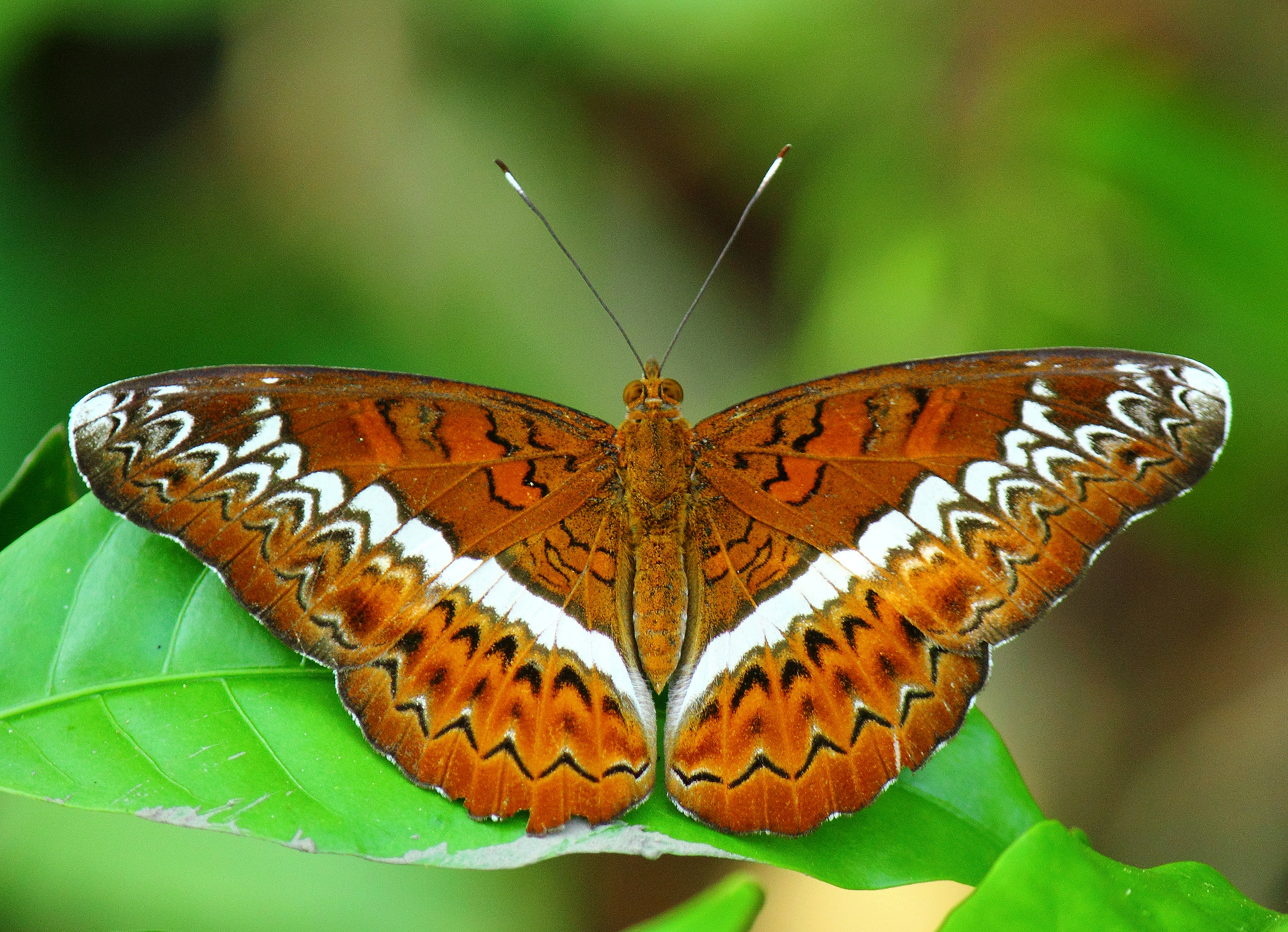
