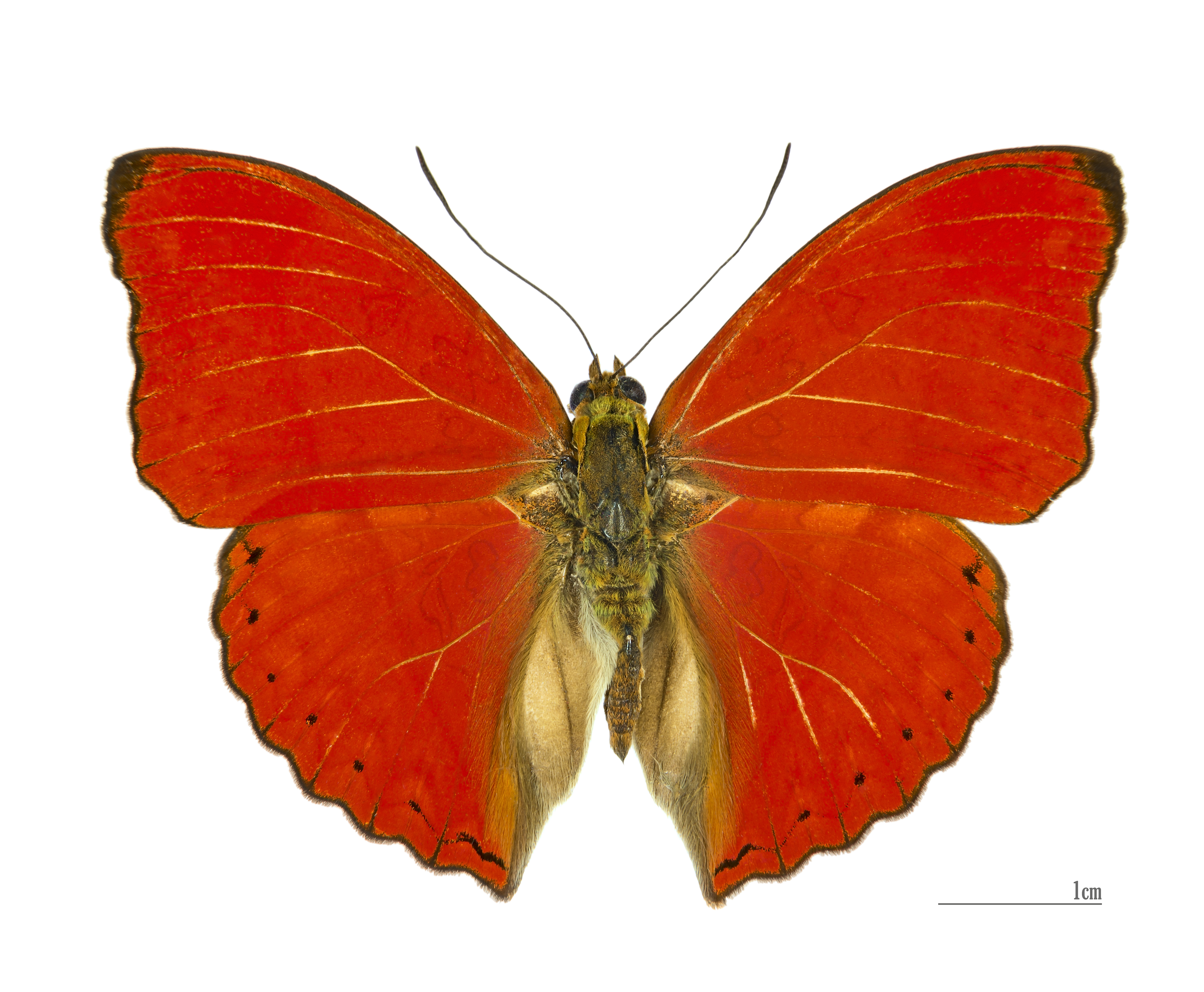
- Dorsal side
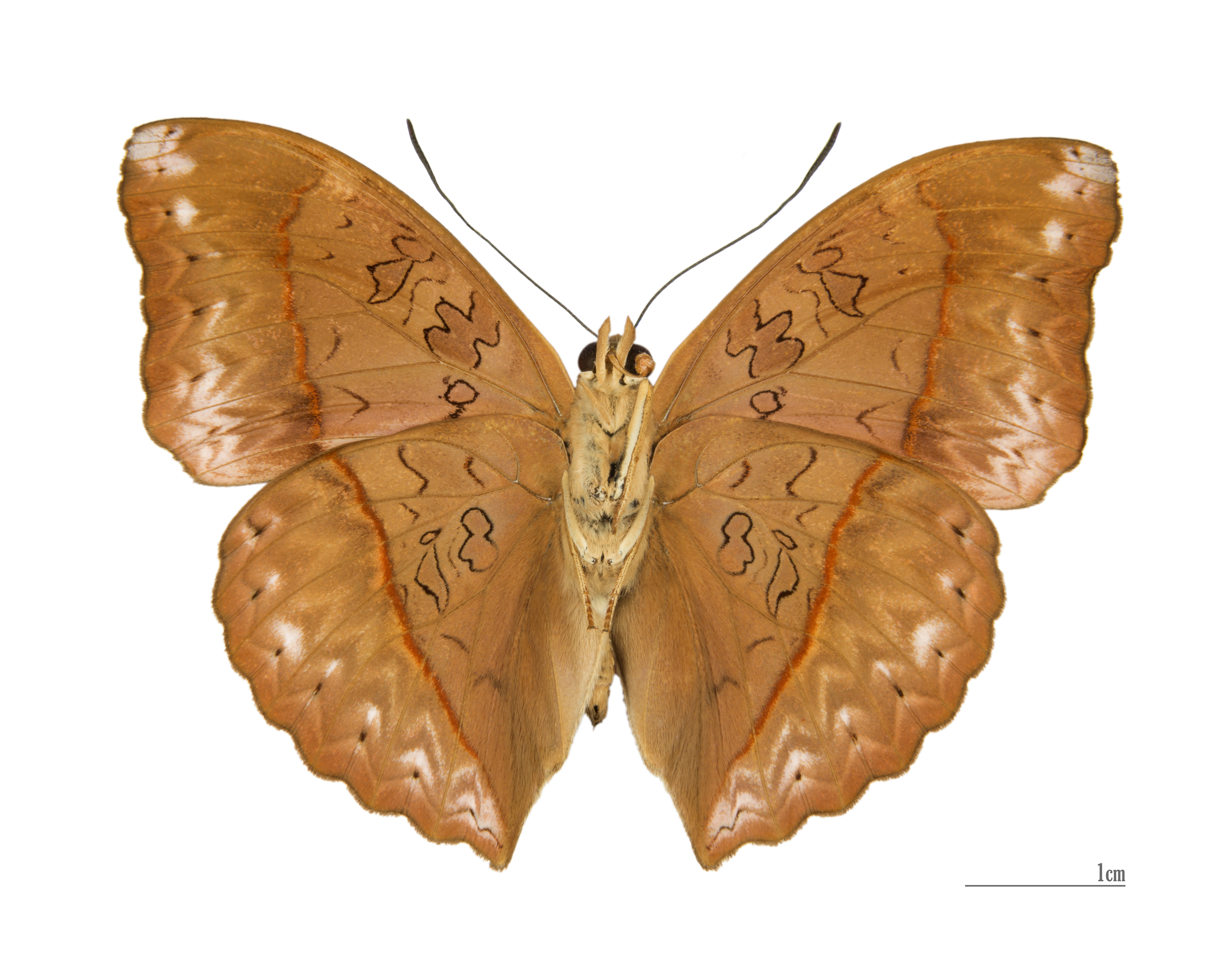
- Ventral side

Scientific classification
- Kingdom: Animalia
- Phylum: Arthropoda
- Clade: Pancrustacea
- Class: Insecta
- Order: Lepidoptera
- Family: Nymphalidae
- Genus: Cymothoe
- Species: C. sangaris

Binomial name
- Cymothoe sangaris (Godart, 1824)

Synonyms
- Nymphale sangaris Godart, 1824; Harma uselda Hewitson, 1869; Cymothoe sangaris ab. reuteri Strand, 1910; Cymothoe sangaris ab. pallida Schultze, 1920; Cymothoe sangaris f. pluviatilis Overlaet, 1945; Cymothoe sangaris reuteri f. extimata Overlaet, 1945; Cymothoe sangaris reuteri f. simplicior Overlaet, 1945; Cymothoe sangaris reuteri f. rubrior Overlaet, 1945; Cymothoe sangaris luluana f. orchymonti Overlaet, 1945

= Cymothoe sangaris =

Blood-red glider

Species of butterfly

Cymothoe sangaris, the blood-red glider, is a species of butterfly of the family Nymphalidae. It is found in Central Africa.

Some authors believe the species should be split into separate species. They base this on morphological characteristics (mainly in the females) and DNA research. The new species would be specialised in one food plant.

Currently, the following subspecies are recognised:

- Cymothoe sangaris sangaris

Range: Guinea, Sierra Leone, Liberia, Ivory Coast, Ghana, Nigeria, Cameroon, Congo, Angola, DRC: Ubangi, Mongala, Uele, North Kivu, Tshopo, Tshuapa, Equateur, Kinshasa, Kwango, Kasai, Sankuru and Maniema provinces

- Cymothoe sangaris luluana Overlaet, 1945

Range: DRC: Lualaba and Lomami provinces, Zambia

The larvae feed on Rinorea species.

Torben Larsen developed a species numbering system for his 2005 publication Butterflies of West Africa. The nominate subspecies is #878. The 'Larsen' numbers have since been used with permission in A Sharp Eye on Butterflies of Ghana.
