= Kumothales =

Scientific classification
- Kingdom: Animalia
- Phylum: Arthropoda
- Class: Insecta
- Order: Lepidoptera
- Family: Nymphalidae
- Subfamily: Limenitidinae
- Genus: Kumothales; Overlaet, 1940
- Species: K. inexpectata

Binomial name
- Kumothales inexpectata Overlaet, 1940

Monotypic brush-footed butterfly genus

Kumothales is a monotypic butterfly genus of the family Nymphalidae. Its only species, Kumothales inexpectata, is found in the Democratic Republic of the Congo (the Kivu-Ruwenzori area), Uganda (from the south-western part of the country to Kigezi) and Rwanda.
