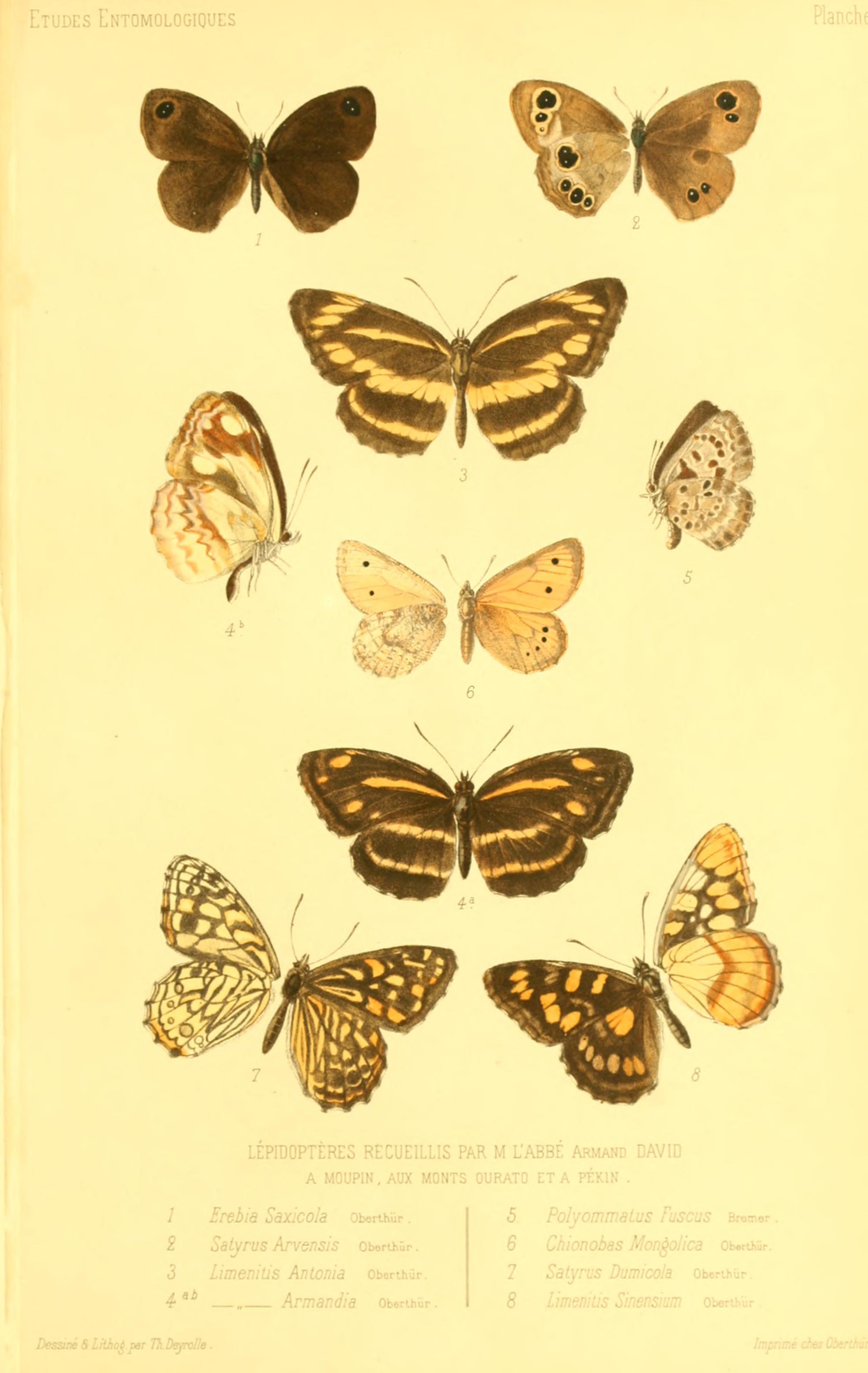
- In Oberthür's 1876 Ètudes d'entomologie: Lépidoptères de Chine

Scientific classification
- Kingdom: Animalia
- Phylum: Arthropoda
- Class: Insecta
- Order: Lepidoptera
- Family: Nymphalidae
- Subfamily: Limenitidinae
- Genus: Patsuia; Moore [1898]
- Species: P. sinensium

Binomial name
- Patsuia sinensium (Oberthür, 1876)

= Patsuia =

Monotypic brush-footed butterfly genus

Patsuia is a butterfly genus of the Limenitidinae subfamily. The genus is confined to western China and Tibet. It is monotypic, containing the single species Patsuia sinensium.
