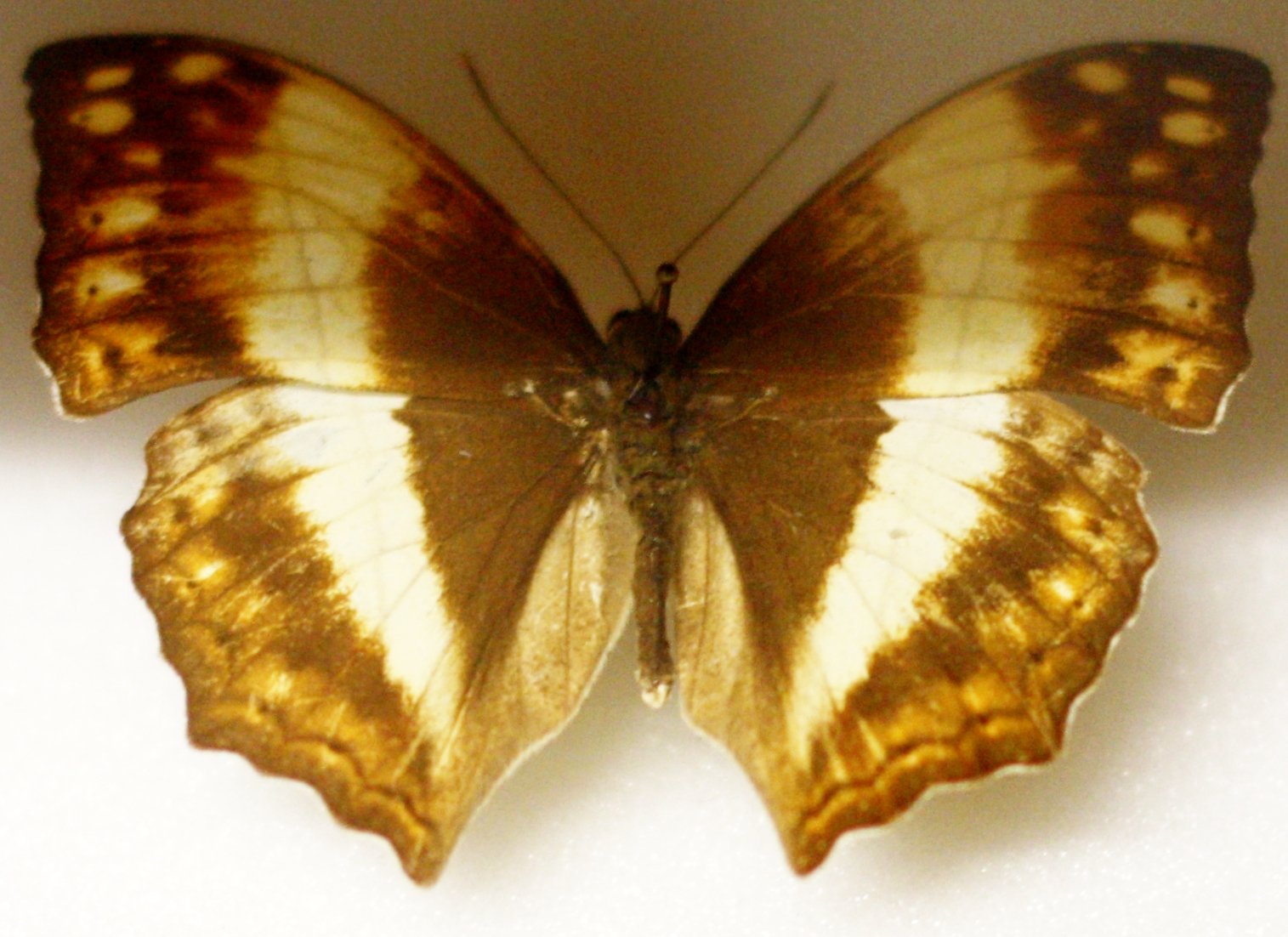
- Specimen from Cameroon
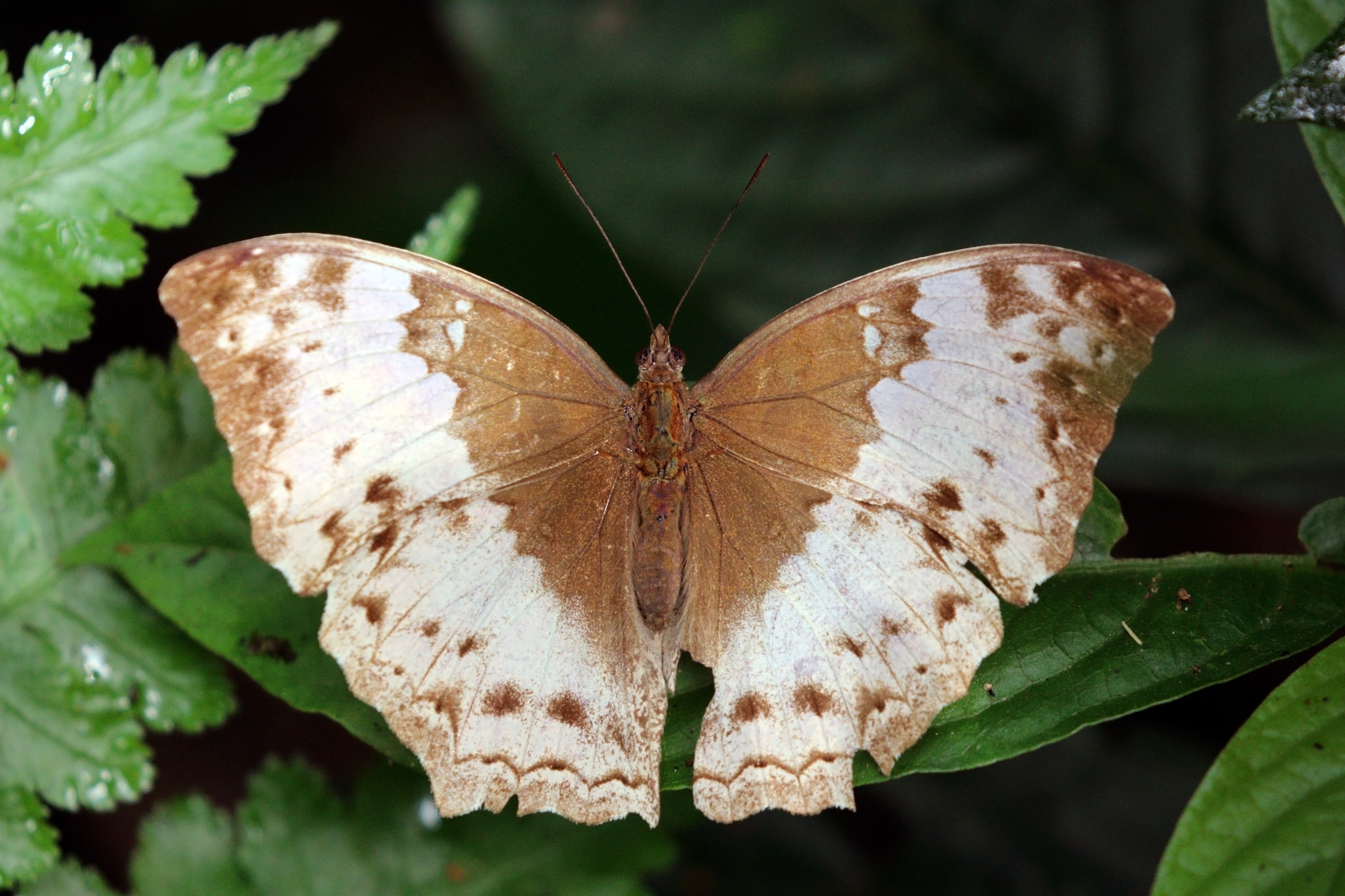
- Female, Kibale National Park, Uganda

Scientific classification
- Kingdom: Animalia
- Phylum: Arthropoda
- Clade: Pancrustacea
- Class: Insecta
- Order: Lepidoptera
- Family: Nymphalidae
- Subfamily: Limenitidinae
- Genus: Harma; Doubleday, [1848]
- Species: H. theobene

Binomial name
- Harma theobene Doubleday, [1848]

Synonyms
- Genus: Amphidema Felder, 1861; Species: Cymothoe theobene; Cymothoe theobene f. umbrina Joicey and Talbot, 1921; Cymothoe blassi Weymer, 1892; Cymothoe theobene nebetheo Suffert, 1904; Cymothoe theobene superna Fox, 1968; Cymothoe theobene ab. sordida Schultze, 1916; Cymothoe theobene ab. dualana Strand, 1914; Cymothoe theobene f. lutescens Poulton, 1922; Cymothoe theobene f. nigrolutescens Poulton, 1922; Cymothoe theobene f. nigrescens Poulton, 1922; Cymothoe (Harma) theobene f. jacksoni van Someren, 1939

= Harma theobene =

Sole species in brush-footed butterfly genus Harma

Harma is a monotypic butterfly genus in the family Nymphalidae. Its one species is Harma theobene, the angular glider. It is found in Guinea, Sierra Leone, Liberia, Ivory Coast, Ghana, Nigeria, from Cameroon to Angola and in the Democratic Republic of the Congo, Uganda, Kenya, Tanzania, Malawi, Zambia, and Mozambique. The habitat consists of forests and heavy woodland.

The larvae possibly feed on Caloncoba gilgiana, Buchnerodendron, Rinorea, Lindackeria (including L. schweinfurthii), and Dovyalis species.

== Subspecies ==
- Harma theobene theobene – Guinea, Sierra Leone, Liberia, Ivory Coast, Ghana, Nigeria
- Harma theobene blassi (Weymer, 1892) – coast of Kenya, eastern Tanzania
- Harma theobene superna (Fox, 1968) – Nigeria: Cross River loop, Cameroon, equatorial Africa, Angola, Democratic Republic of the Congo, Uganda, western Kenya, western Tanzania, Malawi, north-eastern Zambia

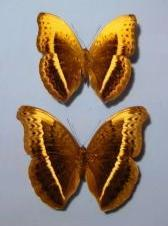
Harma theobene superna from Gabela forest, Angola

Torben Larsen developed a species numbering system for his 2005 publication Butterflies of West Africa. The nominate subspecies is #843. The 'Larsen' numbers have since been used with permission in A Sharp Eye on Butterflies of Ghana.
