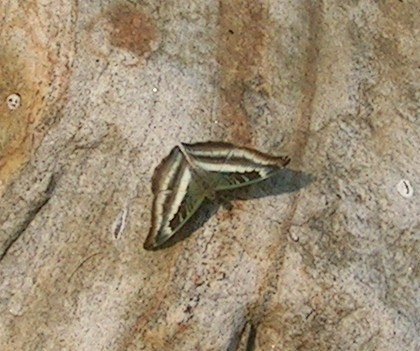

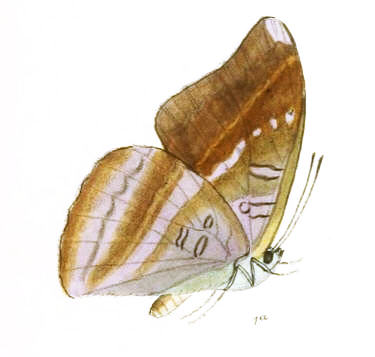

Scientific classification
- Kingdom: Animalia
- Phylum: Arthropoda
- Class: Insecta
- Order: Lepidoptera
- Family: Nymphalidae
- Subfamily: Limenitidinae
- Genus: Auzakia; Moore, [1898]
- Species: A. danava

Binomial name
- Auzakia danava (Moore, [1858])

= Auzakia =

Commodore

Monotypic brush-footed butterfly genus

Auzakia is a monotypic butterfly genus in the family Nymphalidae. It contains the single species, Auzakia danava, the commodore, which is found from Tibet to Sumatra.

== Description ==
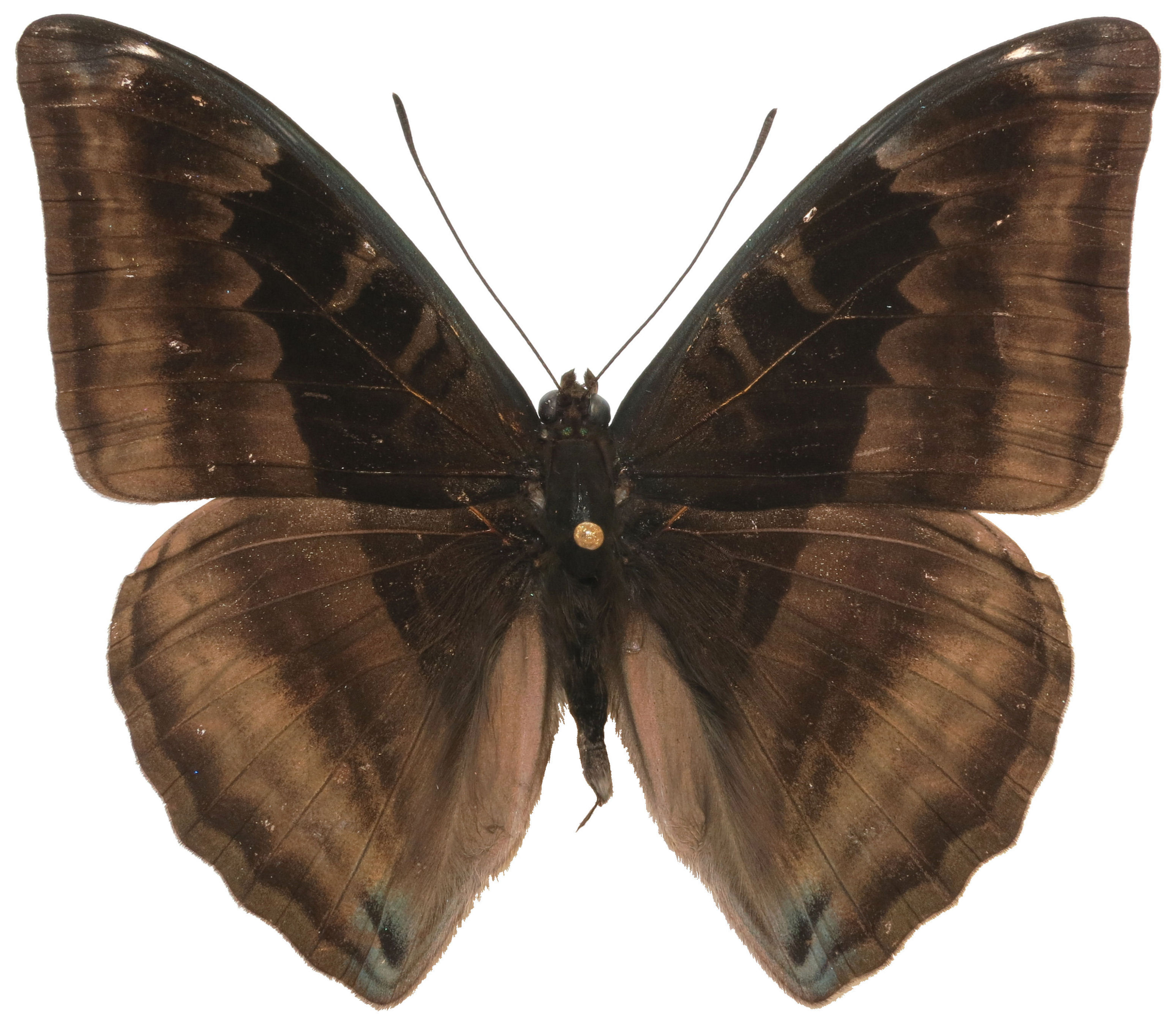
A. danava leechi male, Ya'an

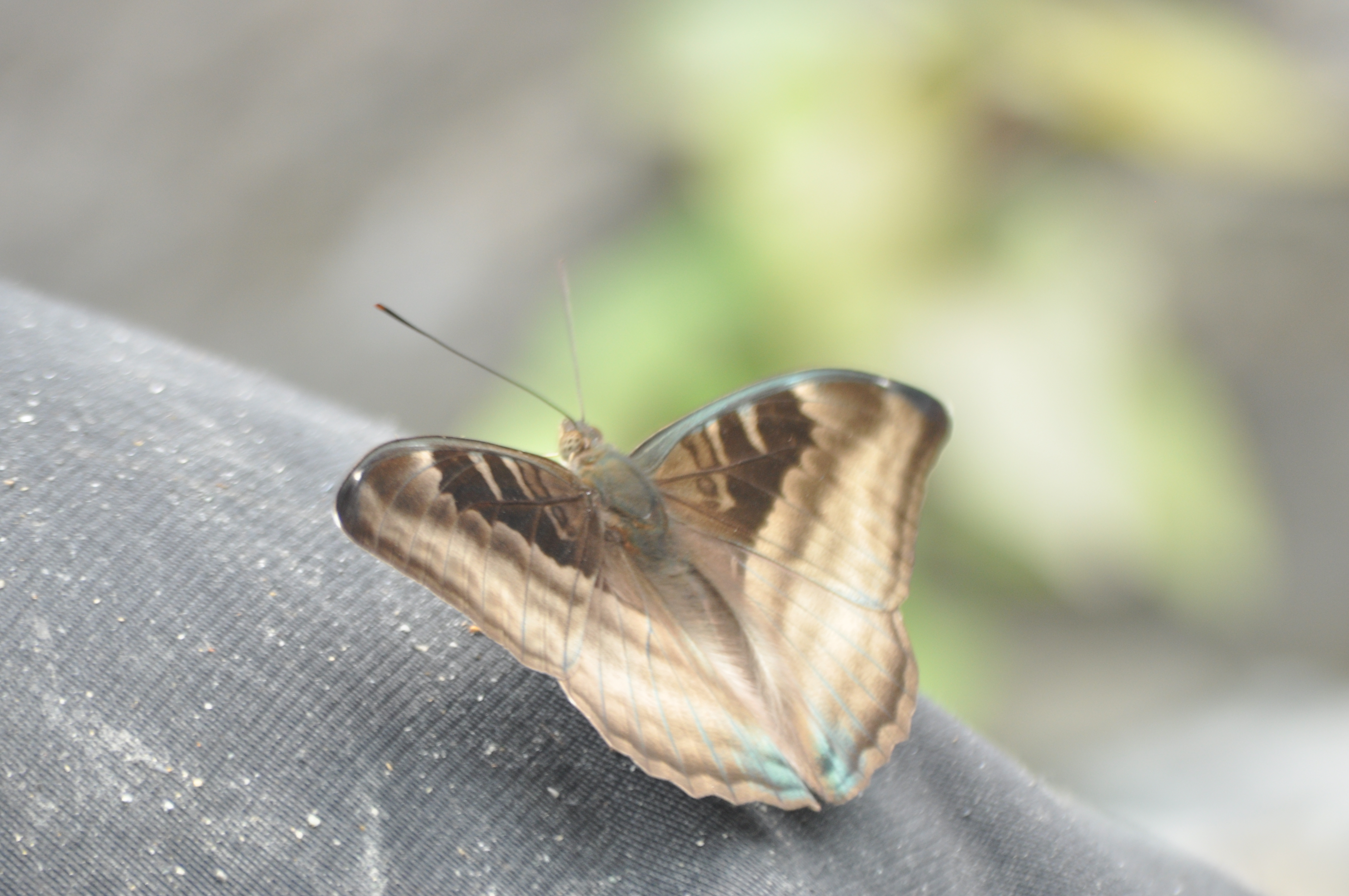
At Buxa Tiger Reserve, West Bengal, India

The upperside of the male is fuliginous brown, paling on the terminal half of the wings. The forewing has the basal area below the cell, two broad bands across the latter, and a patch beyond its apex to the costa dark brownish black, the outer margin of the dark area crenulate (scalloped), extended angularly along the veins; this is followed by a pale olive-brown obscure band, a discal dark brown band widening below costa, and a subterminal narrower band of the same shade; between discal and subterminal bands is a series of faintly defined dark transverse spots in the interspaces. Hindwing: basal third dark brown, followed by a pale olive-brown interspace; discal, postdiscal and subterminal bands as on the forewing; tornus suffused with green. Underside pale ochraceous, suffused with lilacine; cell of forewing crossed by a medial and an apical brighter lilac band bordered with dark lines on both sides; base and cell of hindwing with the usual loop-like slender dark marks with pale centres; a lilac discal band, lunular and curved inwards anteriorly on the forewing, broad and straight on the hindwing, followed on both wings by a yellow postdiscal diffuse narrow band. Forewing with a patch of purplish white on apex: hindwing with a broad transverse subterminal diffuse lilac band traversed by a series of lunular obscure brownish marks; termen of both forewing and hindwing brownish yellow. Antennae, head, thorax and abdomen dark brown; beneath, the palpi, thorax and abdomen pale lilacine white.

Female has the upperside similar to that of the male, but forewings and hindwings crossed obliquely by broad, outwardly somewhat diffuse, prominent white discal and postdiscal bands. These bands slightly tinged with fuliginous and on the forewing somewhat lunular. The postdiscal band on both forewing and hindwing outwardly traversed by a series of detached dark lunules; the dark interspace between the two bands much paler, suffused with green on its inner half. Underside as in the male but very much paler; the series of postdiscal detached lunules as on the upperside.
