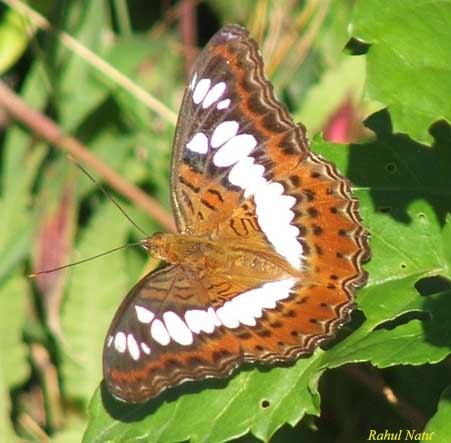
- Commander

Scientific classification
- Domain: Eukaryota
- Kingdom: Animalia
- Phylum: Arthropoda
- Class: Insecta
- Order: Lepidoptera
- Family: Nymphalidae
- Tribe: Limenitidini
- Genus: Moduza; Moore, [1881]

Species
- See text

= Moduza =

Genus of brush-footed butterflies

Moduza is a genus of south-east Asian (Indomalayan realm) brush-footed butterflies commonly called the commanders.

== Species ==
Listed alphabetically:

- Moduza imitata Butler, 1883 Nias
- Moduza jumaloni (Schröder, 1976) Philippines
- Moduza lycone (Hewitson, 1859) Sulawesi, Buton, Wowoni, Muna Island, Banggai, Sula Islands
- Moduza lymire (Hewitson, 1859) Sulawesi, Buton, Muna Island, Banggai, Sula Islands, Kabaena, Togian
- Moduza mata (Moore, 1858) Philippines (Luzon, Mindanao, Cebu)
- Moduza nuydai Shirôzu & Saigusa, 1970 Philippines (Luzon)
- Moduza pintuyana (Semper, 1878) Philippines (Mindanao, Basilan)
- Moduza procris (Cramer, [1777]) – commander (south Asia and Southeast Asia)
- Moduza thespias (Semper, 1889) Philippines (Camiguin)
- Moduza urdaneta (C. & R. Felder, 1863) Philippines (Luzon, Mindanao)
