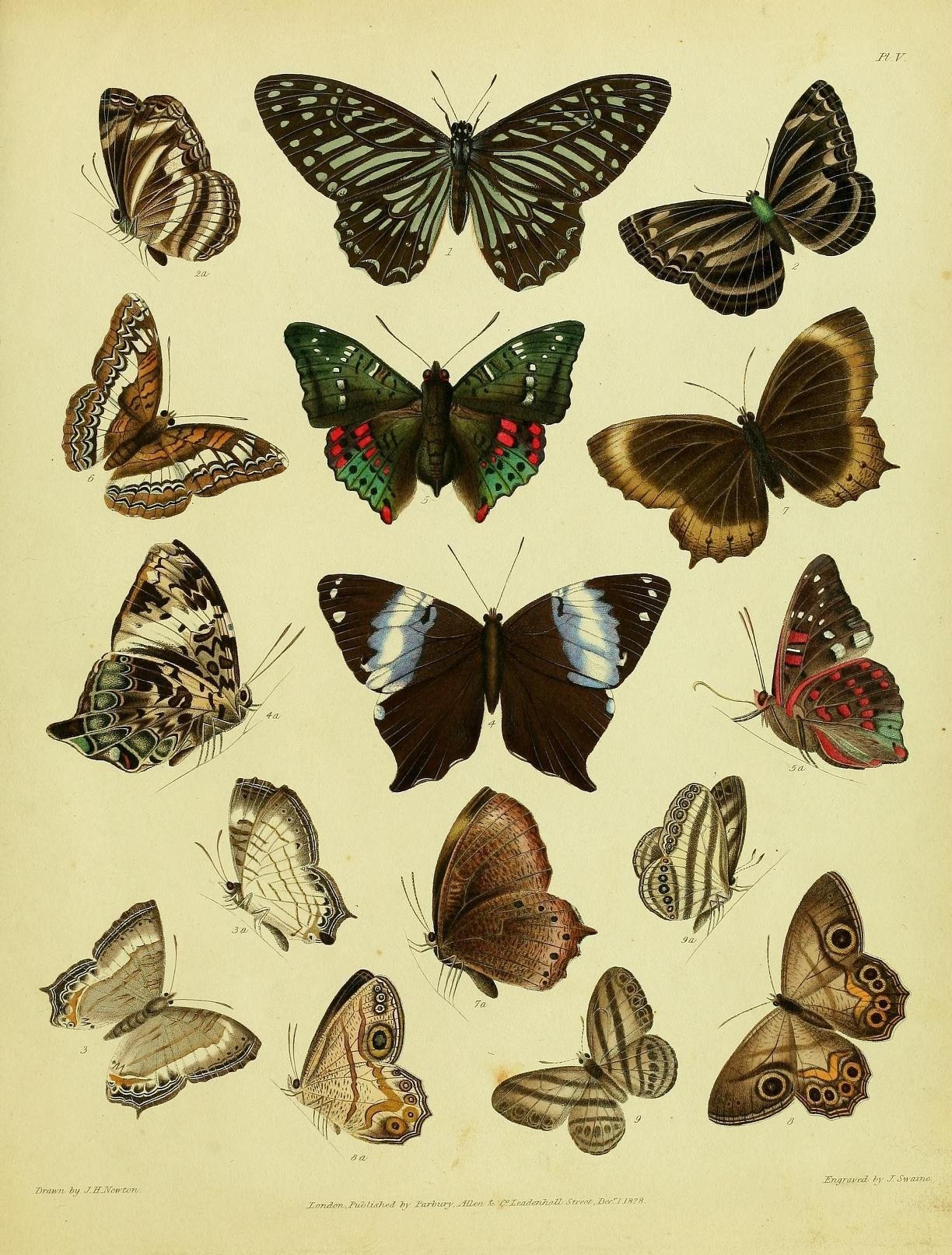
- Lebadea (figure 6) and other Nymphalidae in Thomas Horsfield and Frederic Moore's A Catalogue of the Lepidopterous Insects in the Museum of the Hon. East-India Company

Scientific classification
- Kingdom: Animalia
- Phylum: Arthropoda
- Class: Insecta
- Order: Lepidoptera
- Family: Nymphalidae
- Genus: Lebadea; Felder, 1861

Species
- See text

= Lebadea (butterfly) =

Genus of brush-footed butterflies

Lebadea is a genus of butterflies found in Southeast Asia ranging from India to the Sunda Islands

== Species ==
- Lebadea alankara (Horsfield, [1829]) Java, Sumatra, Borneo
- Lebadea ismene (Doubleday, [1848])
- Lebadea martha (Fabricius, 1787)
