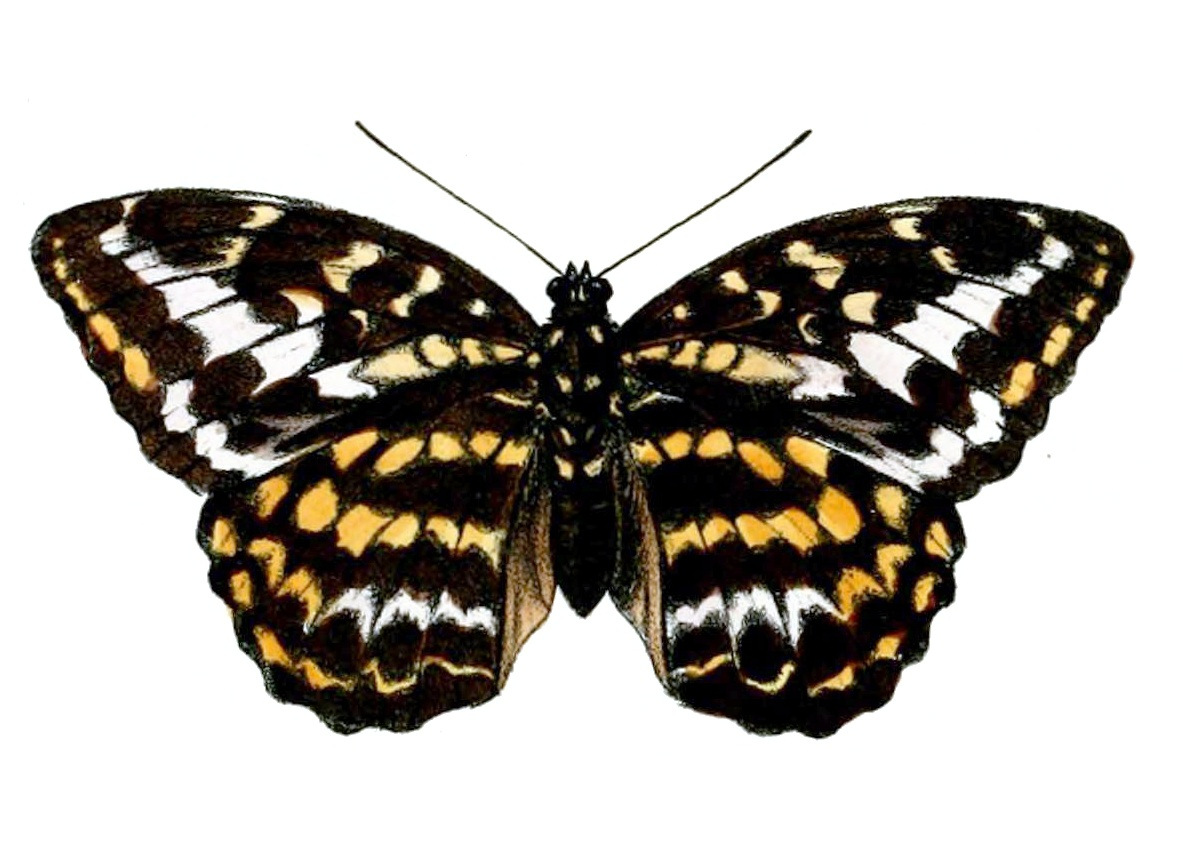
- 1868 illustration

Scientific classification
- Kingdom: Animalia
- Phylum: Arthropoda
- Class: Insecta
- Order: Lepidoptera
- Family: Nymphalidae
- Genus: Lexias
- Species: L. canescens

Binomial name
- Lexias canescens (Butler, [1869])

Synonyms
- Symphaedra canescens

= Lexias canescens =

Species of butterfly

Lexias canescens, the yellow archduke, is a species of butterfly belonging to the family Nymphalidae. It was first described by Arthur Gardiner Butler in 1869.

Lexias canescens pardalina in Bukit Timah Nature Reserve, Singapore - video clip

== Description ==
Lexias canescens has a wingspan of about 10 cm (3.9 in). These butterflies have dark brown and whitish or yellow-spotted upper surface of the wings, which is an efficient camouflage against predators. Caterpillars are pale green with long spinous bristles.

The male of Lexias canescens pardalina is rather similar to a small female of Lexias pardalis but the underside of its hindwings shows a yellow-washed color.

Seitz-It is a small, insignificant species, differing from Lexias dirtea in having both sexes almost alike, but still resembling it in the red-brown palpi and the close resemblance of both sexes to the pattern of the female of E. dirtea F. The arrangement of the yellow spotting which varies on the different islands in which it occurs canascens canescens Btlr. (127 a) has the macular rows on the hindwings not always red-brown but usually pale clay-yellow. In the female the spots are larger, those in the median area of the forewing changing to white; moreover, the submarginal macular row of both wings is in the middle and at the anal angle also whitish.

== Subspecies ==
Subspecies include:

- Lexias c. leopardina (Fruhstorfer, 1913) a lovely form of the Sulu Islands in which the white colouring reaches its maximum, the forewings being, with the exception of the black cell, almost completely white. On the hindwing an entirely white submarginal band and pale yellow median spots. Under surface of the forewings likewise completely white. Hindwings with the exception of a yellow anterior portion suffused with whitish-blue.
- Lexias c. ornatus Tsukada, 1991
- Lexias c. pardalina (Staudinger, 1886) forewing with larger yellow patches than in canescens Btlr. from Borneo, but in the female lacking the whitish-yellow spots characteristic of that form, giving it an almost male appearance. The females lack on the under surface of tigrina. the forewing the indistinct whitish blotches of canescens.
- Lexias c. tigrina (Fruhstorfer, 1913) males having the forewings spotted with whitish instead of yellowish.
- Lexias c. civetta (Fruhstorfer, 1913)Beneath darker than pardalina or tigrina; fore wings with reduced yellow-brown median spots. Male almost exactly like female. According to Dr. Martin it is only found on the Tableland of Sumatra, always scarce

== Distribution and habitat ==
This species is present in Southeast Asia (Borneo, Peninsular Malaya, Singapore, Sumatra, Bangka Island, Sulu Islands, Belitung). These butterflies inhabit tropical forests among undergrowth and on shaded trails.

== Biology ==
Adults can be found year-round, with a peak from June to September. They mainly feed on organic matter and rotting fruit.

== Bibliography ==
- Khew Sin Khoon. A Field Guide to the Butterflies of Singapore.
- Beccaloni, G.W., Scoble, M.J., Robinson, G.S. & Pitkin, B. (Editors). (2003) The Global Lepidoptera Names Index (LepIndex).
- Yokochi, T. 1995: Two new subspecies of Lexias canescens Butler from Indonesia (Lepidoptera: Nymphalidae). Futao 19: 8–9.
- Casteleyn, 2004, Butterflies of the World: Nymphalidae VIII, Lexias
- Yutaka Inayoshi - Butterflies in Indo-China
