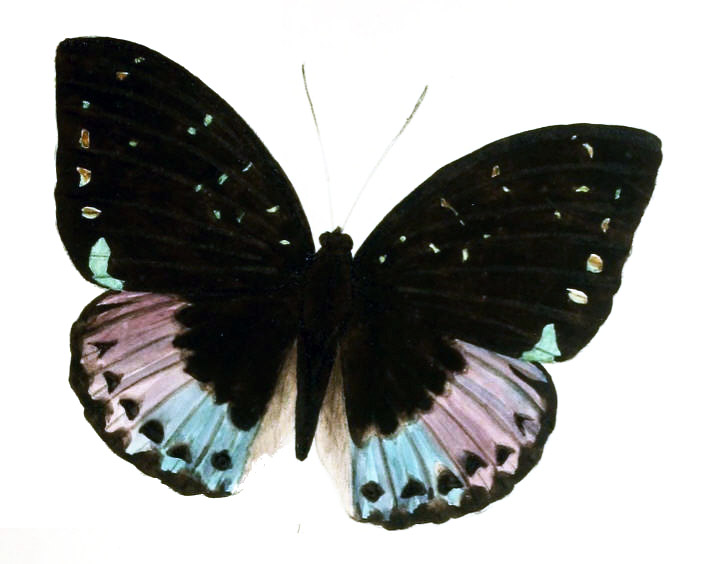

Scientific classification
- Kingdom: Animalia
- Phylum: Arthropoda
- Class: Insecta
- Order: Lepidoptera
- Family: Nymphalidae
- Genus: Lexias
- Species: L. cyanipardus

Binomial name
- Lexias cyanipardus (Butler, [1869])

= Lexias cyanipardus =

Species of butterfly

Lexias cyanipardus, the great archduke, is a species of butterfly belonging to the family Nymphalidae. It was first described by Arthur Gardiner Butler in 1869. It is found in the Indomalayan realm. (Assam, Yunnan, Thailand).

It is the largest of all the species of Adolias as well as of all the Euthaliidi and is distinguished by the blue and white-dotted female, the dark green under surface, the long, quite black antennae and the dark palpi. Sexual organs very much like those of dirtea F., but stouter, uncus thicker basally, valve slightly more slender, distinctly curved distally, uncus with a helmet- shaped crest.cyanipardus Btlr. (127 c E) is, Male fore wing with large white dot before the apex, and a narrow, irregular, dark green submarginal band. On the hindwing the submarginal band tapers gradually from costa to anal angle, being intersected by the black veins. The costal spot is quite isolated, either enclosing a minute dot, or being cut into by a thin black streak. The remaining spots have a peculiar tulip-shaped appearance, inwardly sinuous and outwardly stalked. Before the apex some rounded black dots. The black marginal border of the hindwings is streaked with green. Ciliae black and white. The female has the forewing spotted with white, the base and outer fascia sprinkled with blue. On the hindwing a median double row of white, blue-edged dots. The submarginal double lunular row consists near the costa of violet, for the rest pale blue spots interspersed with whitish atoms. Under surface pale sea-green with numerous white spots. Male length of forewing 53 mm, female 64 mm.

== Subspecies ==
- L. c. cyanipardus Assam to Yunnan
- L. c. grandis Yokochi, 1991 Thailand, Yunnan

== Gallery ==
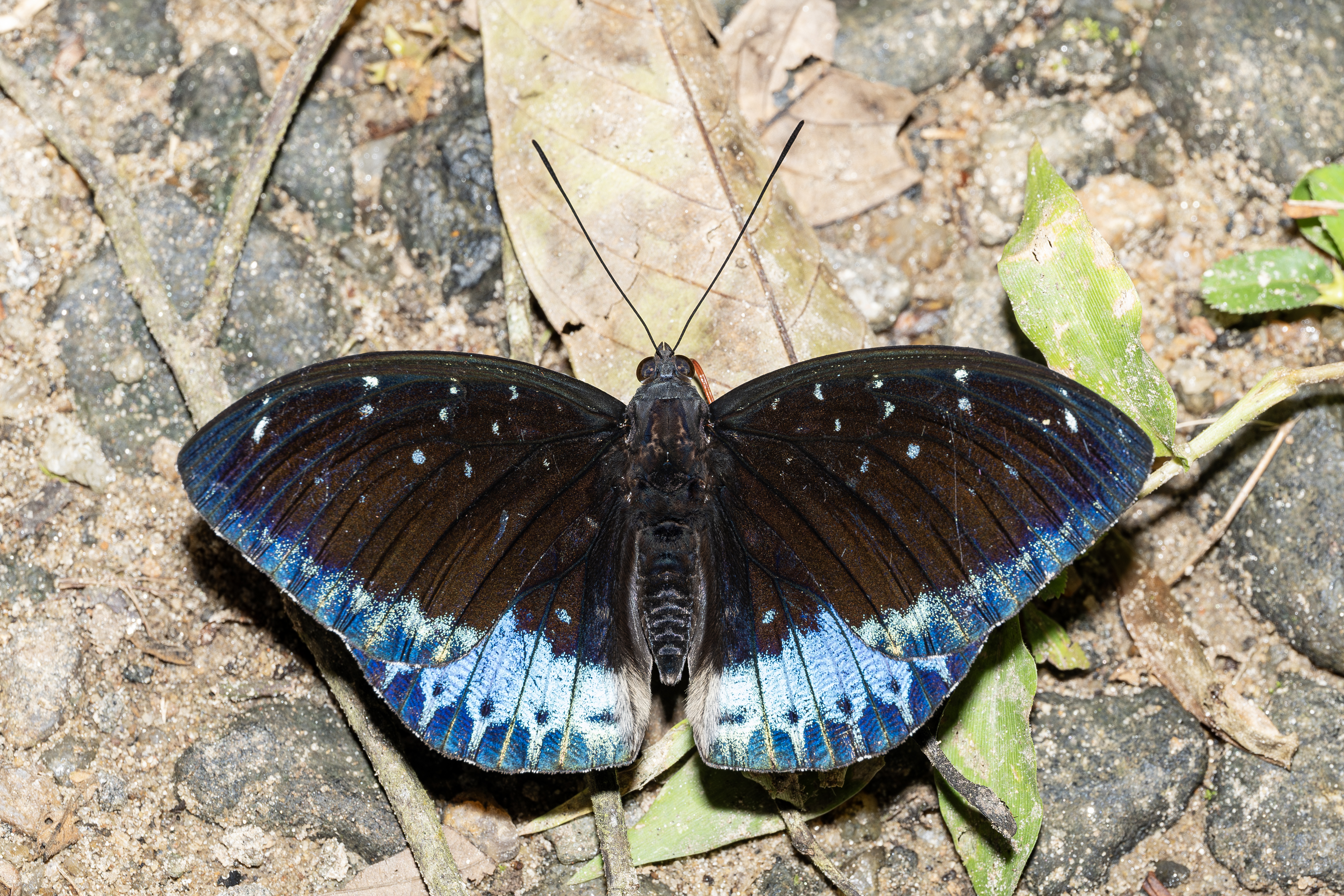

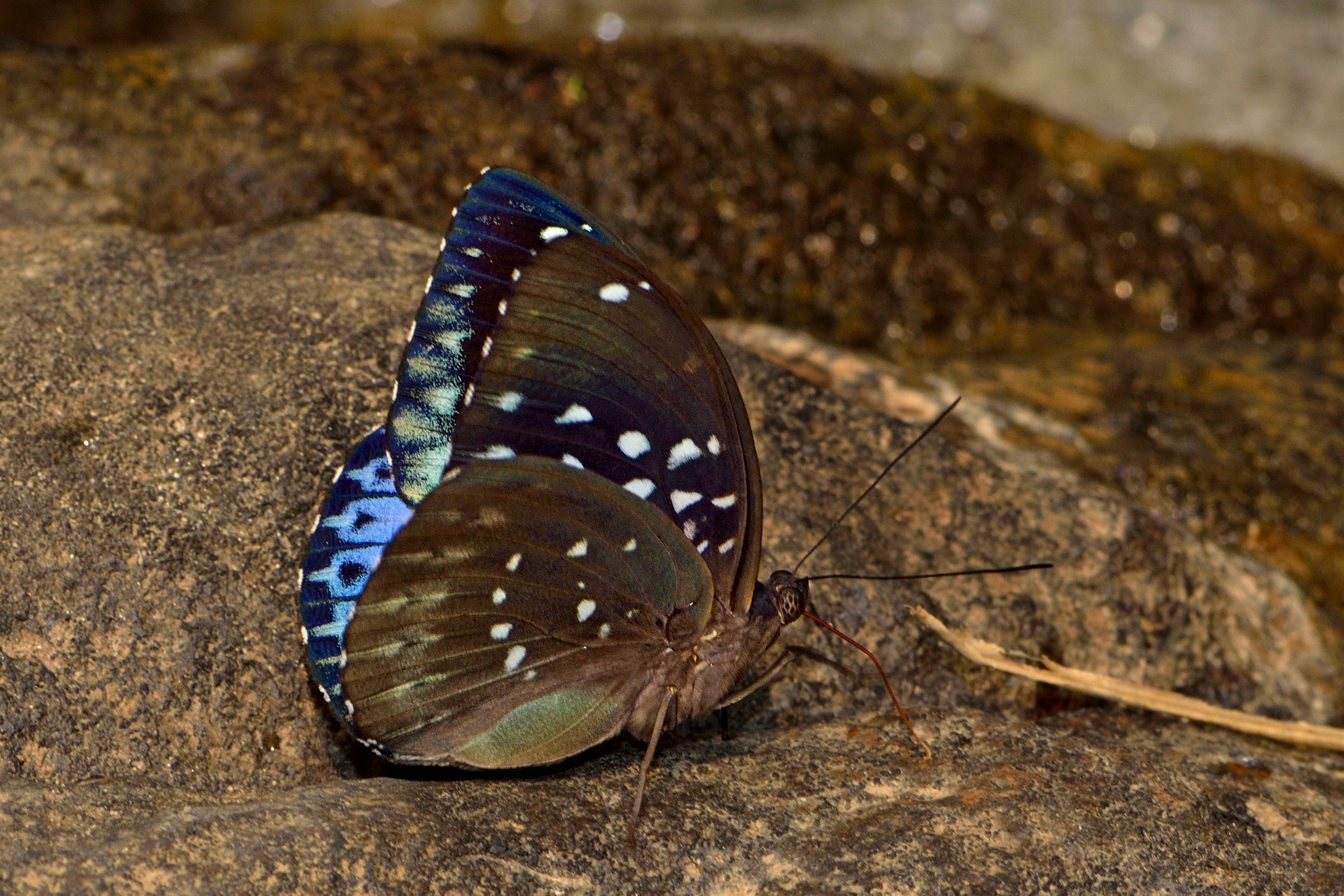

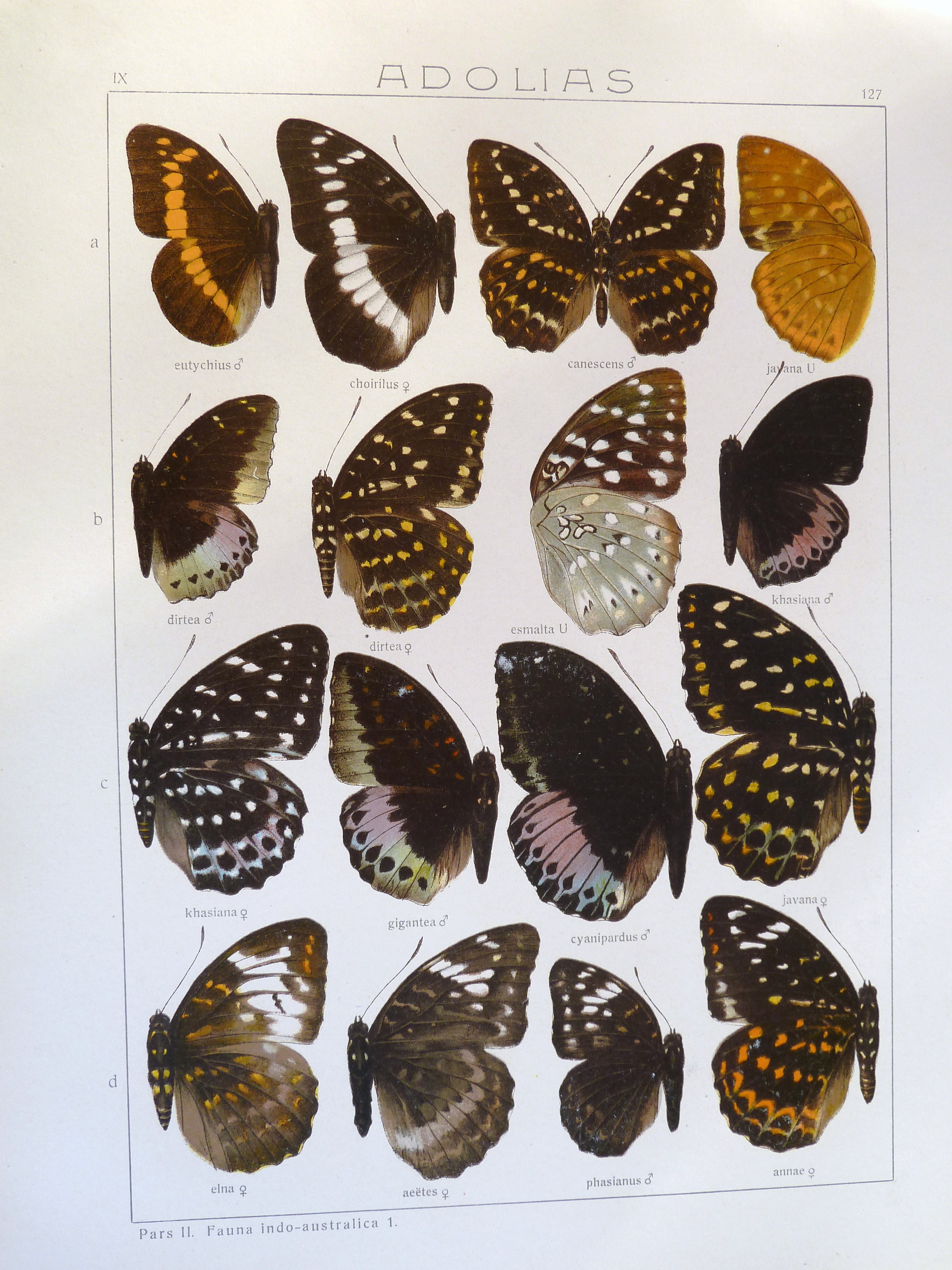
