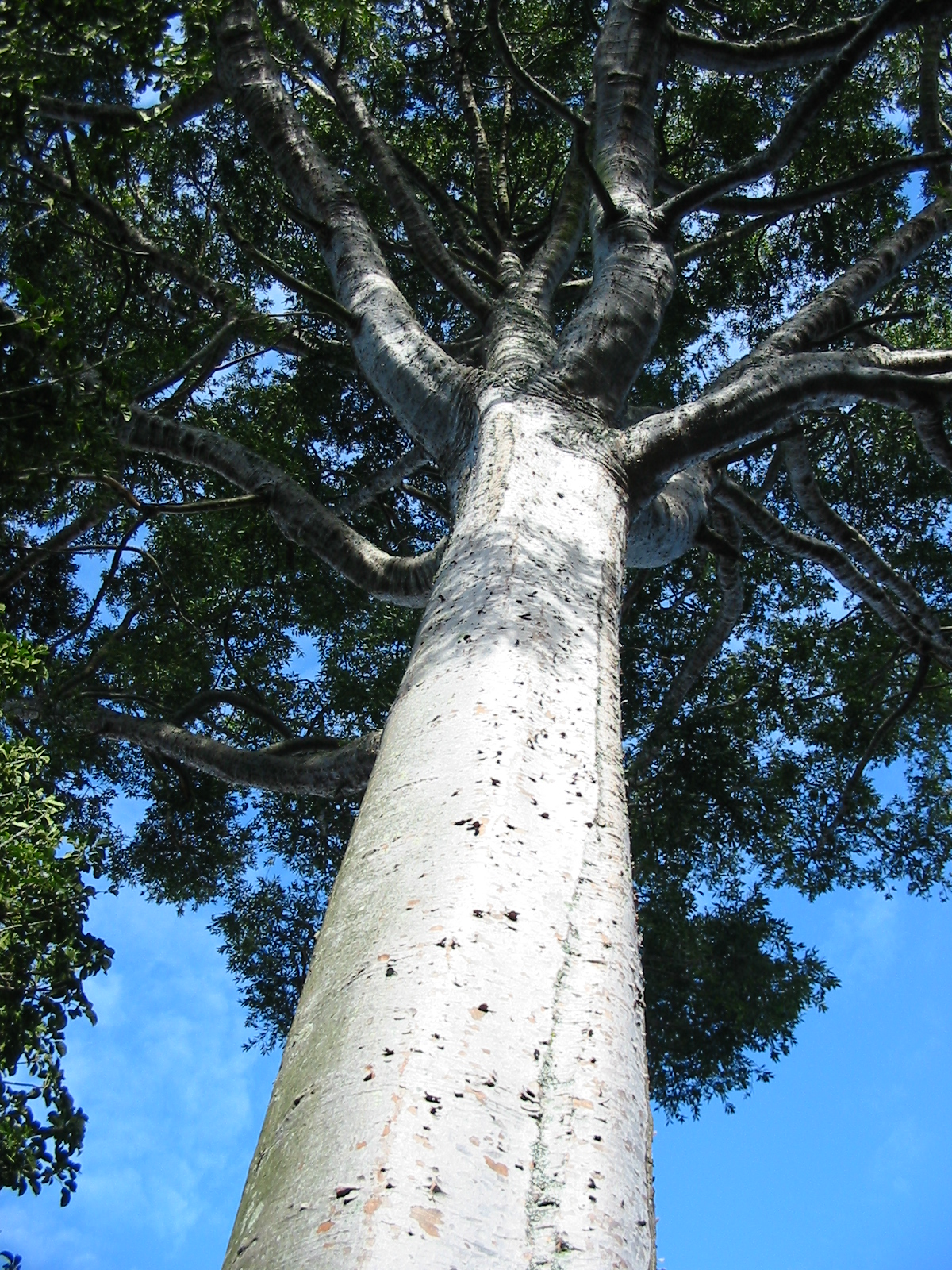

Conservation status
- Least Concern (NCA)
- Least Concern (IUCN 3.1)

Scientific classification
- Kingdom: Plantae
- Clade: Tracheophytes
- Clade: Gymnosperms
- Division: Pinophyta
- Class: Pinopsida
- Order: Araucariales
- Family: Araucariaceae
- Genus: Agathis
- Species: A. robusta

Binomial name
- Agathis robusta (C.Moore ex F.Muell.) F.M.Bailey

Subspecies
- Agathis robusta subsp. nesophila Whitmore; Agathis robusta subsp. robusta
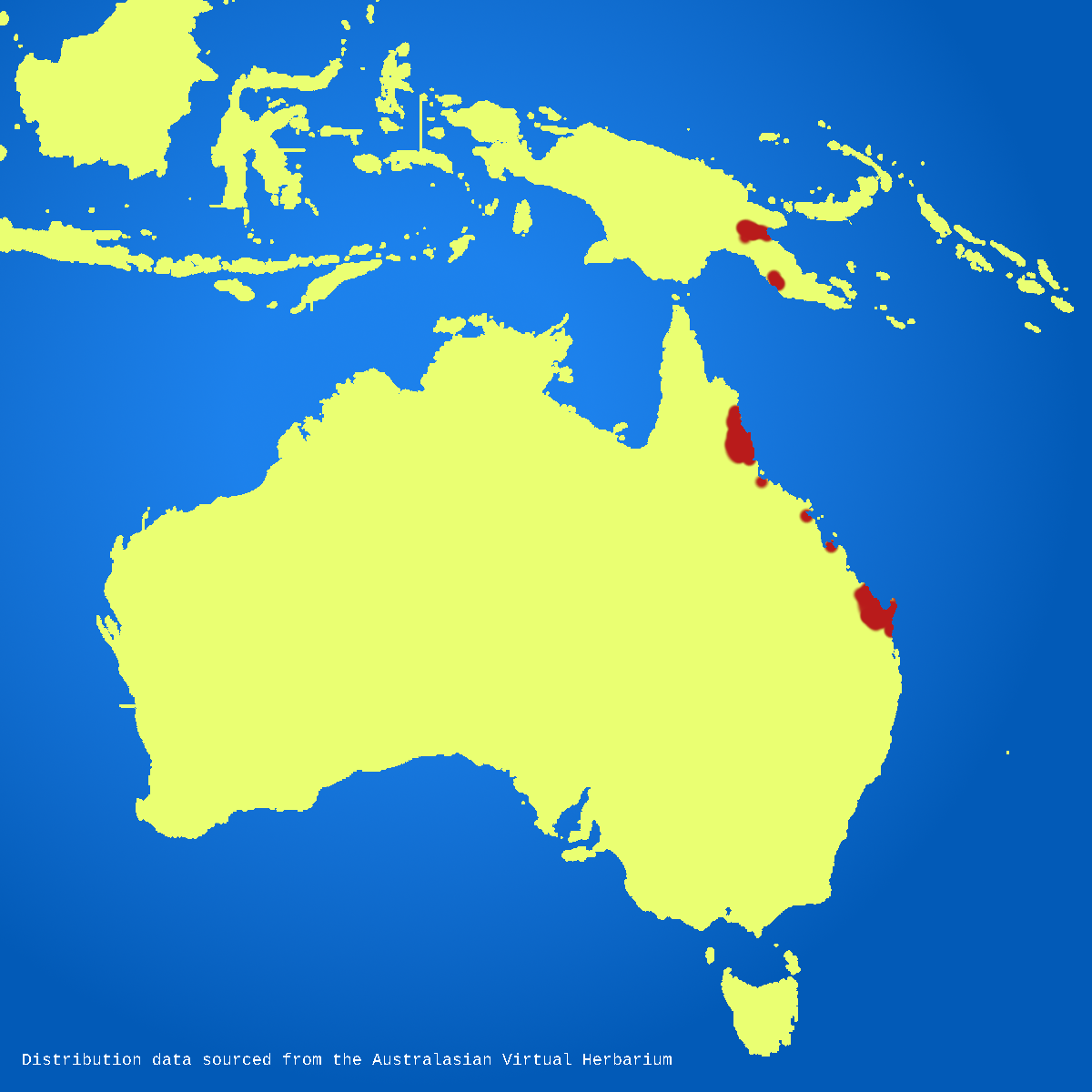

Synonyms
- Dammara robusta C.Moore ex F.Muell.

= Agathis robusta =

Queensland kauri

Species of coniferous tree

Agathis robusta, the Queensland kauri (pine), kauri pine or smooth-barked kauri, is a coniferous tree in the family Araucariaceae. It has a disjunct distribution, occurring in Papua New Guinea and in two widely separated locations in Queensland, Australia. It was first described in 1859 and was heavily logged in the mid-19th century. It is not a true pine (family Pinaceae), despite the common name.

== Description ==
Agathis robusta is a large tree with a straight cylindrical trunk, which can often reach a height of 30–40 m (98–131 ft), and occasionally 50 m (160 ft). The trunk is usually about 1.2 m (3 ft 11 in) diameter at breast height (DBH), but occasionally may reach 3 m (9.8 ft). The bark is orange-brown to grey-brown, smooth, but shedding in large flakes.

The linear-elliptic leaves are up to 13 cm (5.1 in) long and 4 cm (1.6 in) wide, with numerous fine parallel veins and no midrib. They are carried on petioles measuring 3 to 10 mm (0.1 to 0.4 in) and are arranged in opposite pairs (rarely whorls of three) on the stem.

The globose, green seed cones measure 8–13 cm (3.1–5.1 in) diameter with up to 440 scales, and mature in 18–20 months after pollination. They disintegrate at maturity to release the seeds. The male (pollen) cones are cylindrical, 5–10 cm (2.0–3.9 in) long and 9 mm (0.4 in) diameter.

== Taxonomy ==
The Queensland kauri was first described as Dammara robusta in 1859 by the German-born Australian botanist Ferdinand von Mueller and published in the journal Quarterly Journal and Transactions of the Pharmaceutical Society of Victoria. In 1883 the Colonial Botanist of Queensland Frederick Manson Bailey published a paper in which he gave the species its current binomial name Agathis robusta.

=== Subspecies ===
There are two recognised subspecies as of April 2024, namely:

- Agathis robusta subsp. nesophila Whitmore which is restricted to eastern New Guinea and New Britain
- Agathis robusta ssp. robusta, the autonymous subspecies, which is native to New Guinea and Queensland.

=== Etymology ===
The genus name Agathis is from the Ancient Greek word ἀγαθίς 'ball of thread', a reference to the appearance of the female cones. The species epithet is derived from the Latin word rōbustus meaning 'robust'.

=== Common names ===
This species is most commonly known as 'Queensland kauri' or 'kauri pine', but alternative names include 'dundathu pine' (from the town of Dundathu in southern Queensland), 'north Queensland kauri', 'south Queensland kauri' and 'smooth barked kauri'.

== Distribution and habitat ==
Agathis robusta occurs in three distinct locations—a southern population in southeast Queensland in the regions around Gympie, Maryborough, and K'gari (Fraser Island); another population in northeast Queensland in the regions from Ingham to Cooktown, including the Atherton Tablelands; and the third in New Guinea. The north Queensland population was formerly recognised as Agathis palmerstonii, but is now considered to be synonymous with the southern grouping.

The species grows in rainforest on well-drained soils of various types, at elevations up to 1,100 m (3,600 ft) and where the annual rainfall is between 1,100 and 2,000 mm (43 and 79 in).

== Ecology ==
The seeds of the Queensland kauri are eaten by sulphur-crested cockatoos (Cacatua galerita).

== Conservation ==
Agathis robusta is listed by both the Queensland Department of Environment and Science and the IUCN as least concern. However, the IUCN assessment states that the "subspecies in Papua New Guinea has been assessed as Vulnerable" due to ongoing, albeit limited, logging.

=== Pests and diseases ===
A number of Lepidoptera species utilise the Queensland kauri as a host plant, including Agathiphaga queenslandensis, Heteropsyche poecilochroma, Leipoxais rufobrunnea, Darna nararia, Orgyia australis, Achaea janata, and Lexias dirtea.

== Uses ==
This tree produces a high quality timber, which was used for a variety of purposes, such as cabinetmaking, joinery, framing, and plywood. This led to it being heavily logged from the mid-19th century, with the result that the large stands of these trees, which were once common, are now gone, although many individual trees may still be found. Logging in north Queensland continued until the establishment of the Wet Tropics of Queensland World Heritage area in 1987.

== Cultivation ==
State-owned plantations of kauri were established in both north and south Queensland in the first half of the 20th century and met with varying degrees of success; however, today little more than 100 ha (250 acres) of plantation kauri exists.

More than 80 of these trees have been planted in the streets and parks of Cairns.

A long avenue of mature kauris, planted in the 1930s, are maintained at the heritage-listed North Queensland tourist attraction, Paronella Park.

== Gallery ==
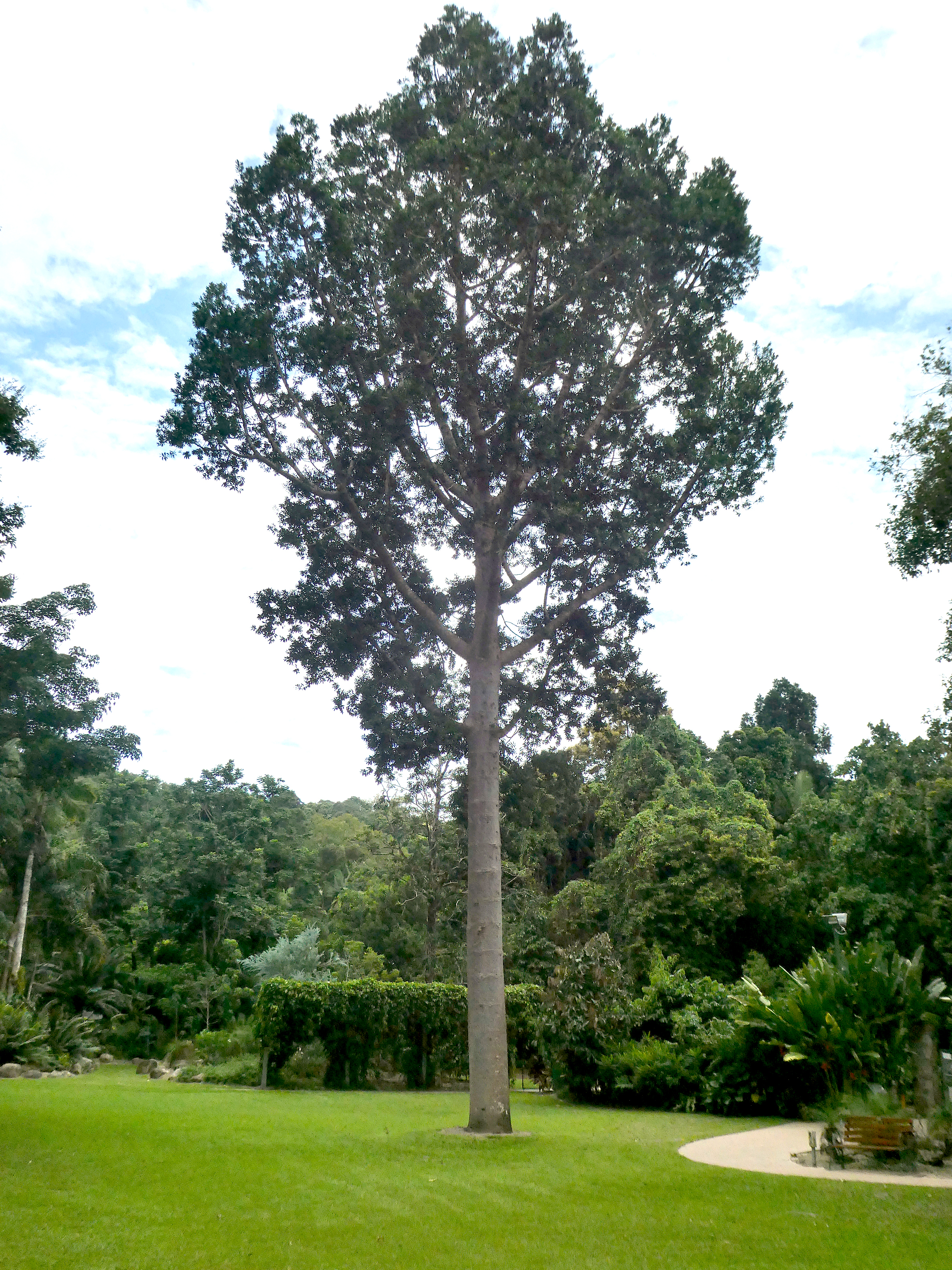
Specimen in the Cairns Botanic Gardens

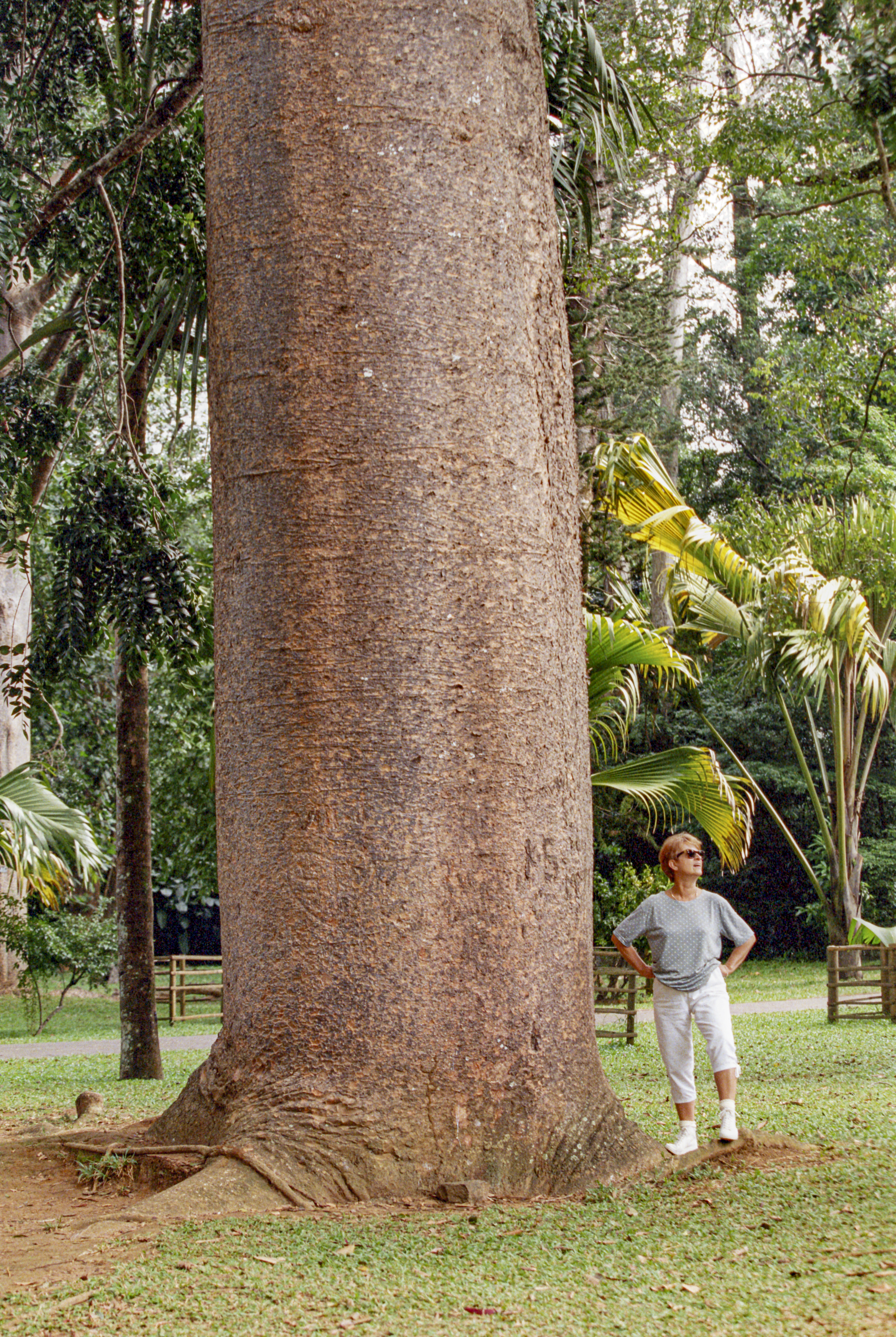
Trunk

Bark

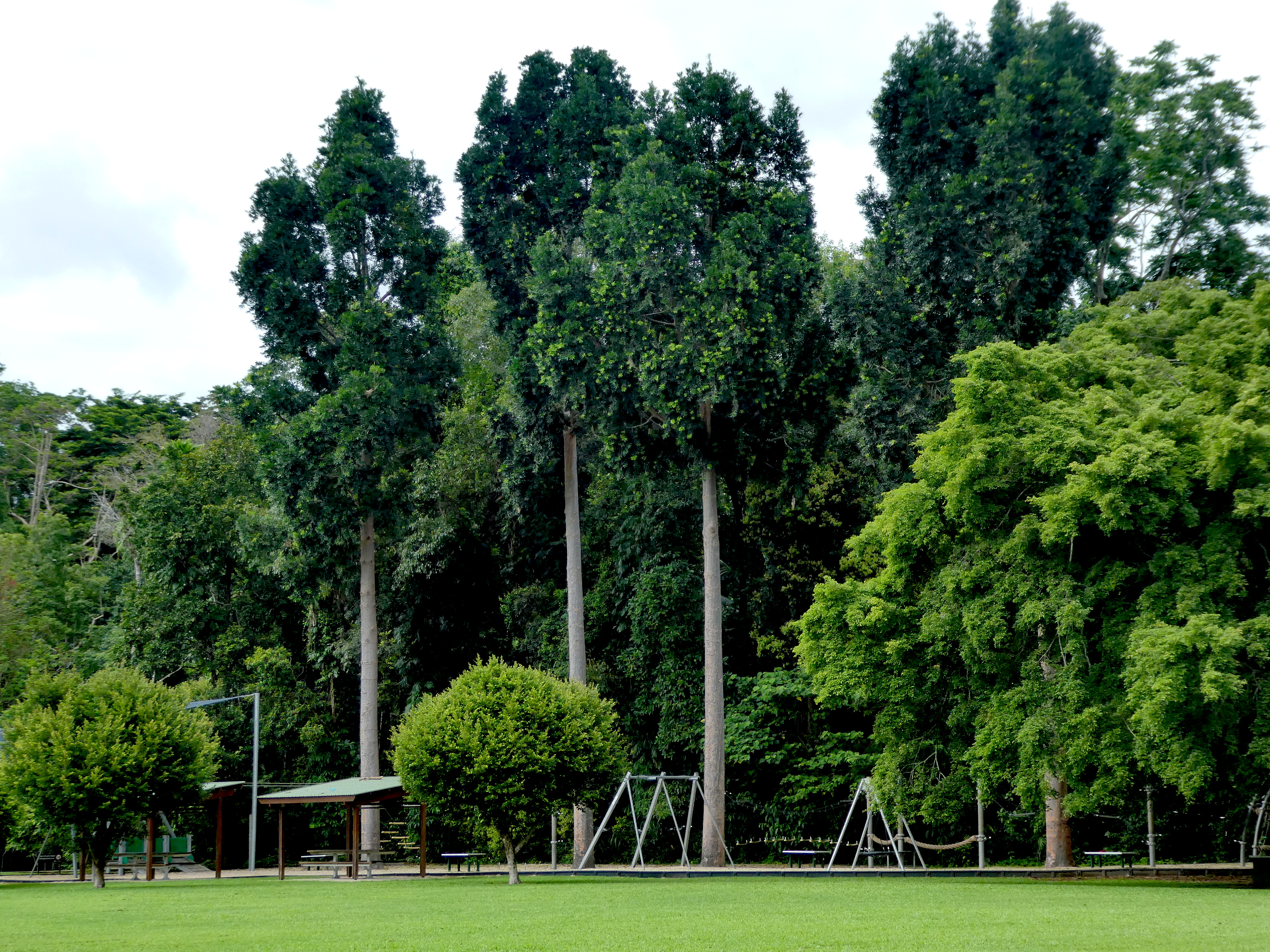
Near Freshwater Ck, Cairns

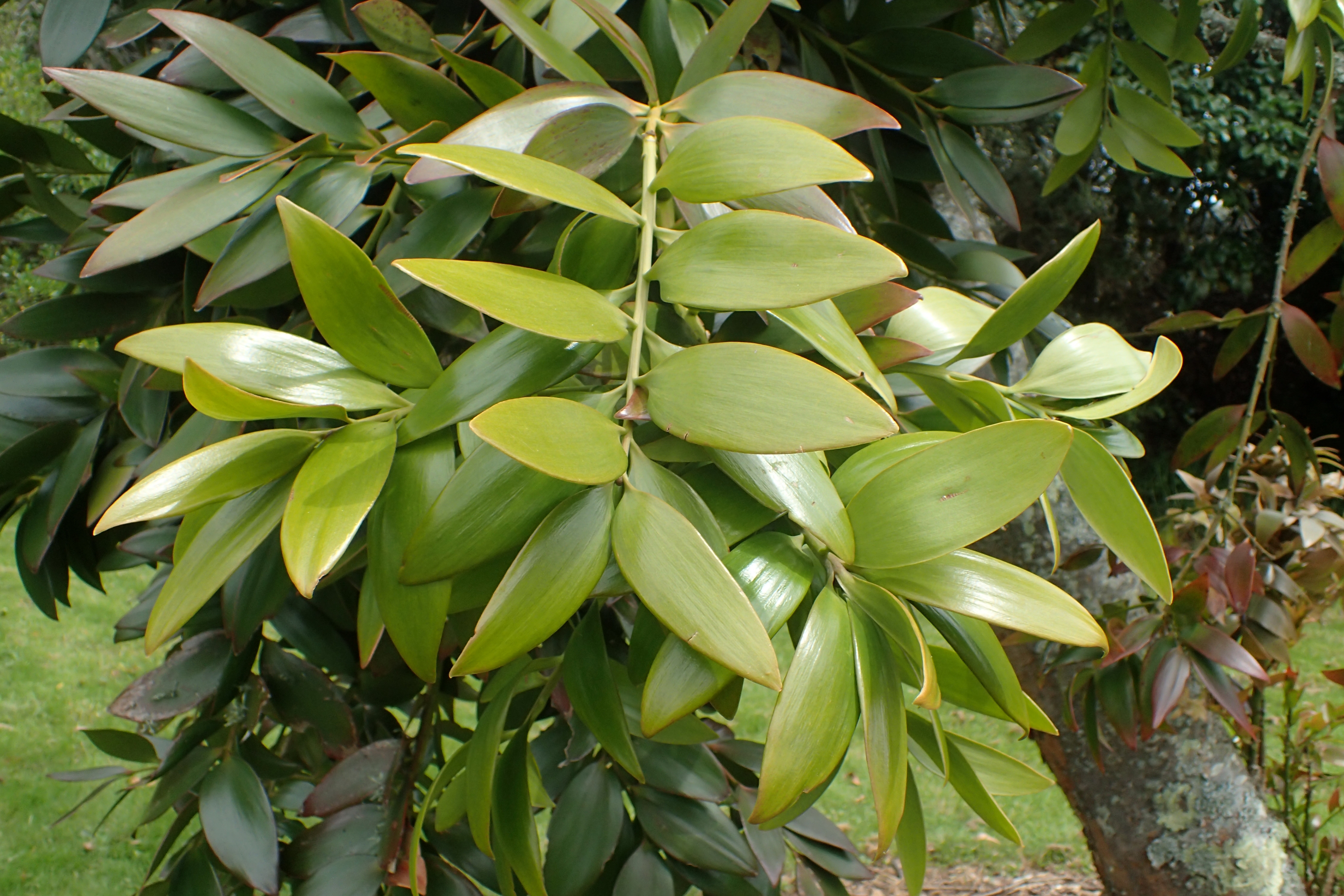
Foliage

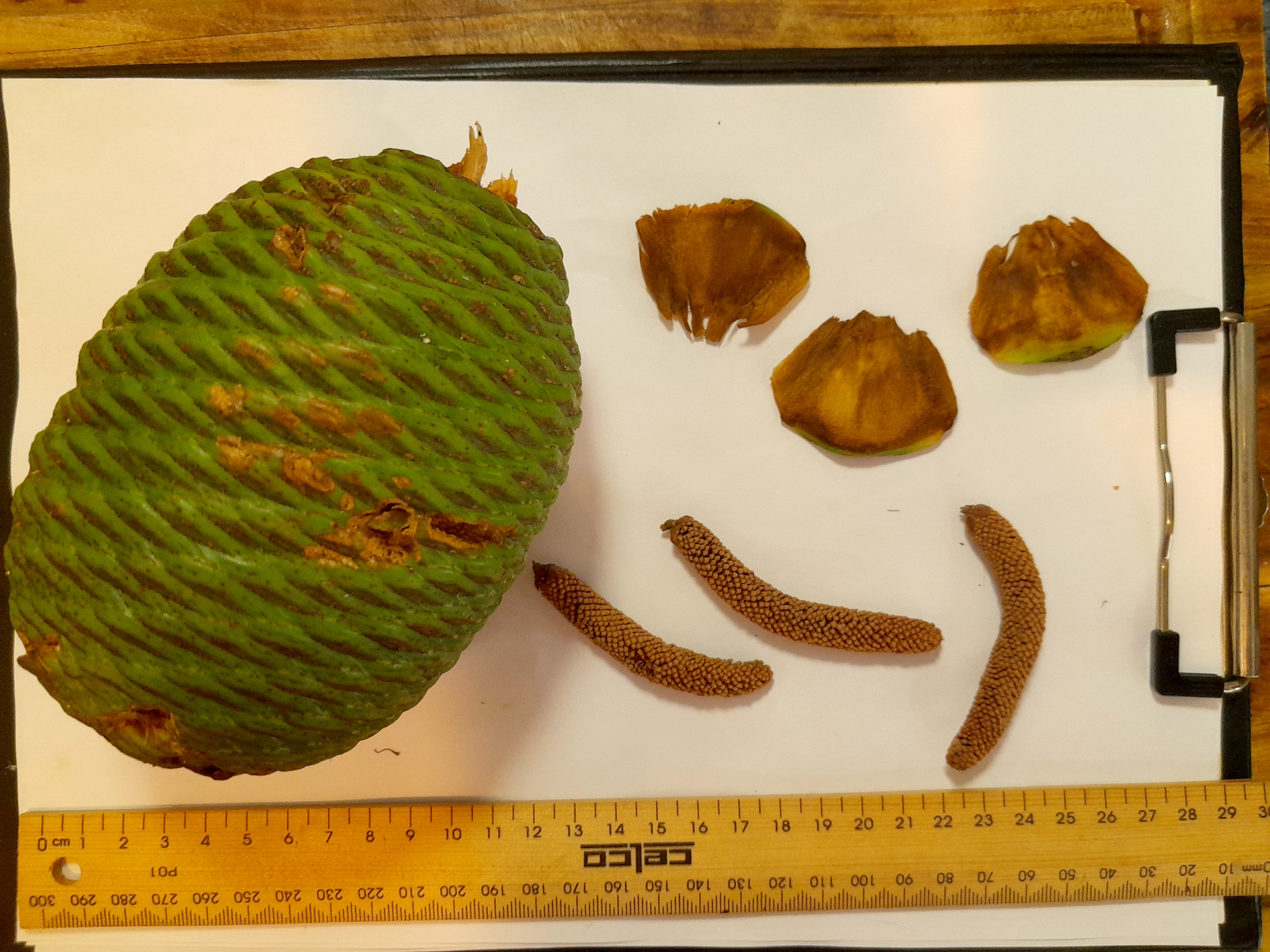
Female and male cones

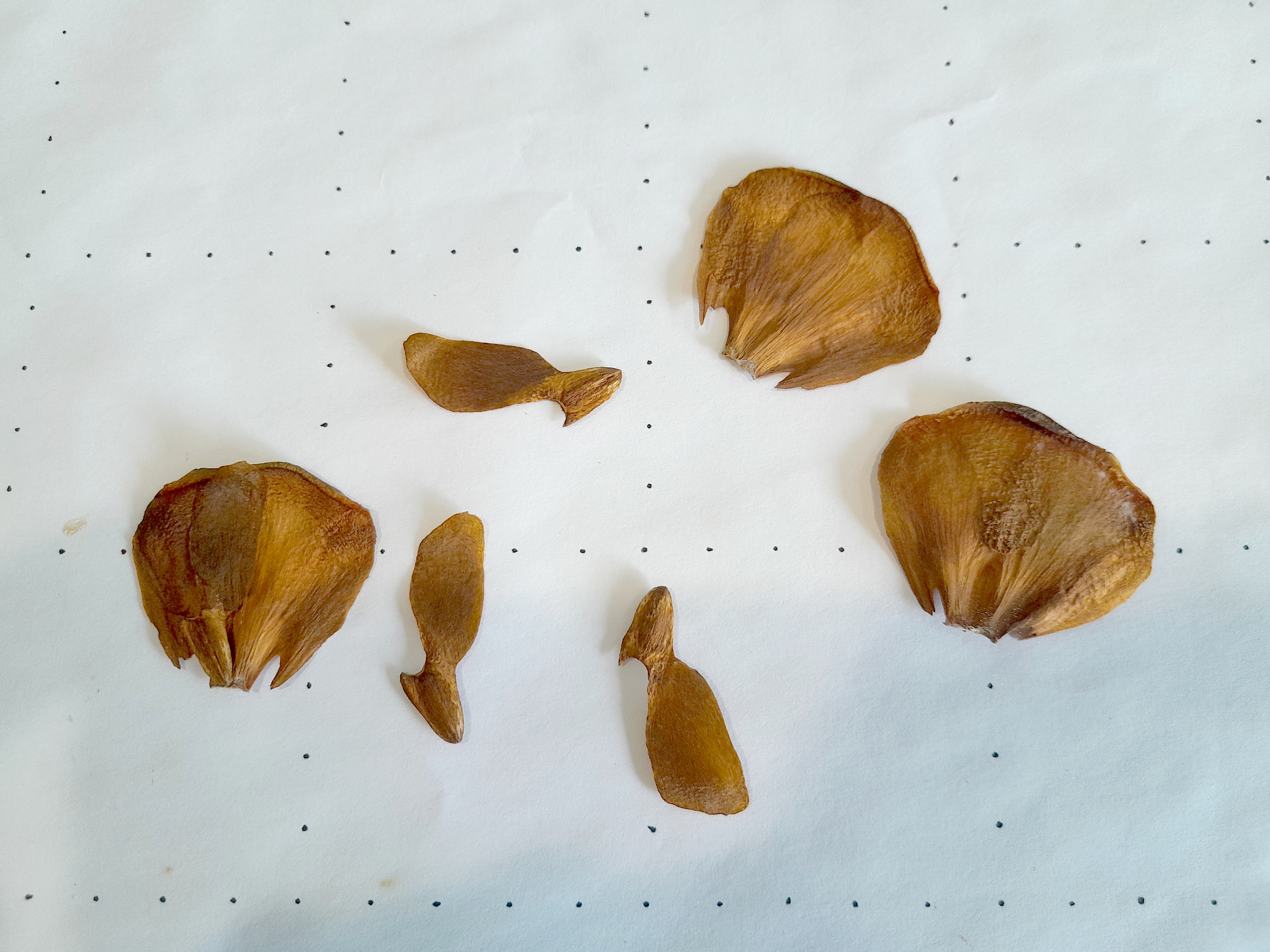
Scales and seeds from female cone

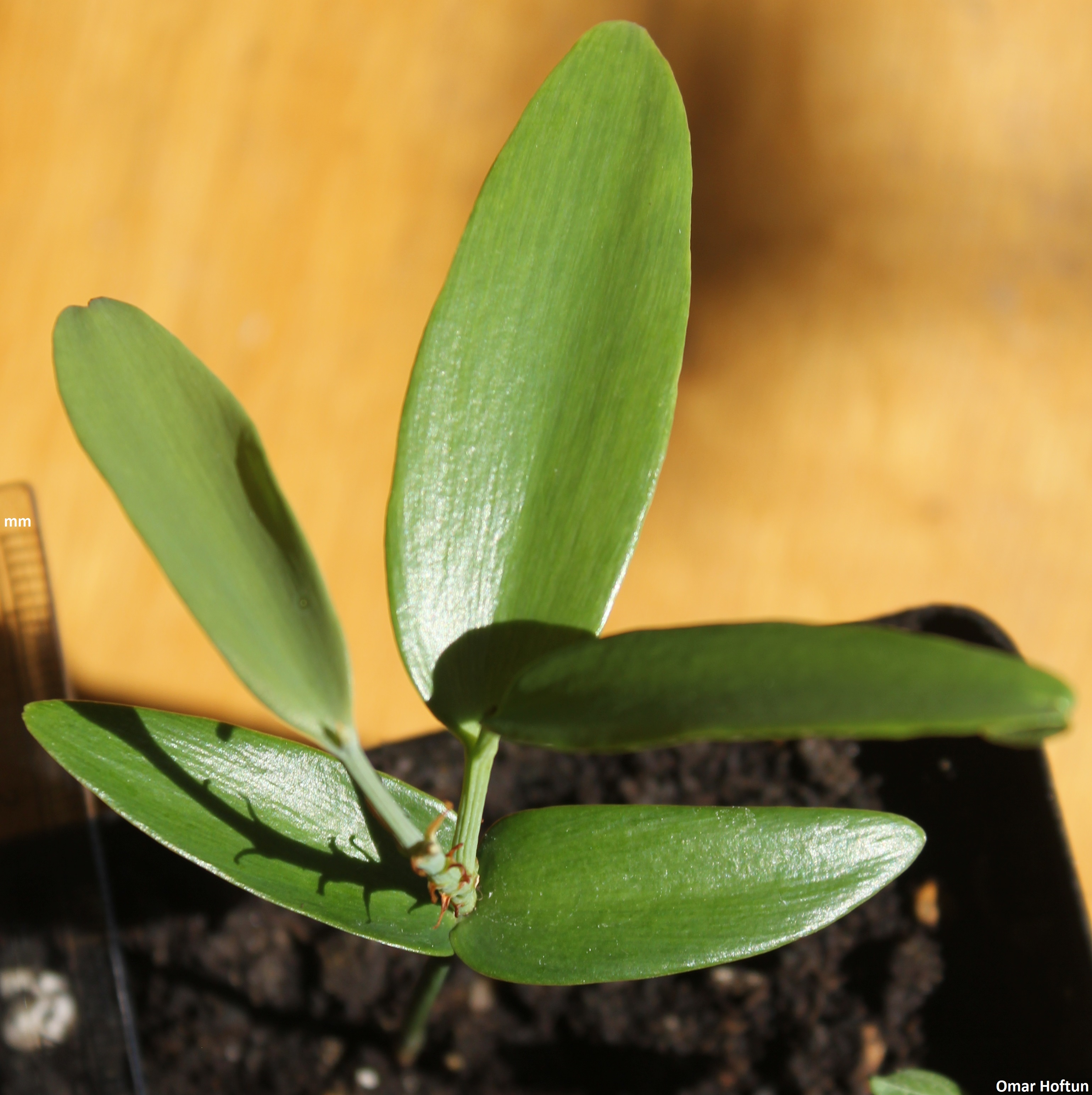
Seedling

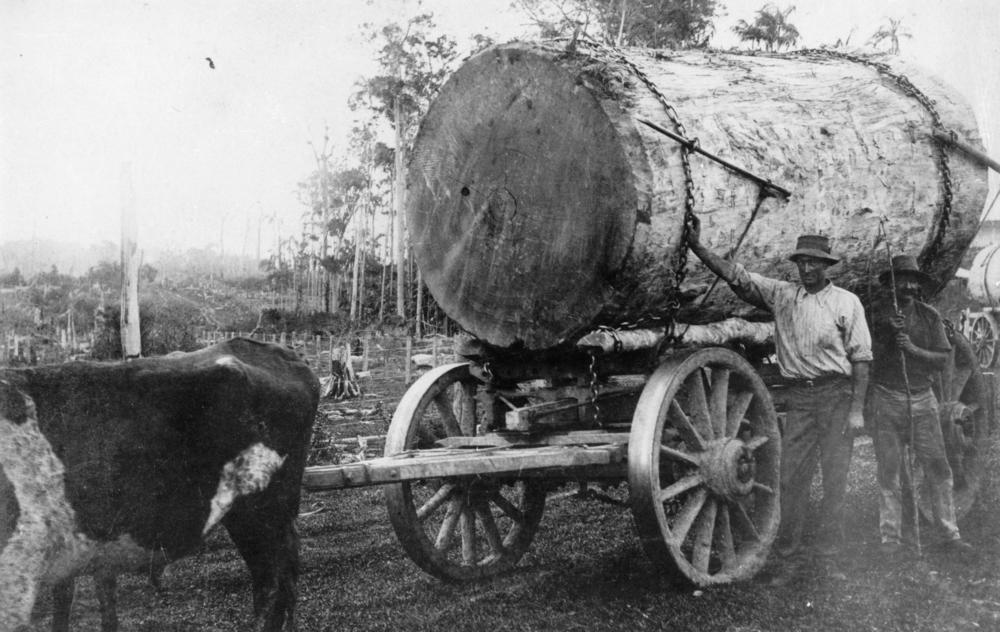
Harvesting kauri logs, circa 1912
