= Agathis robusta subsp. nesophila =

Conservation status
- Vulnerable (IUCN 3.1)

Scientific classification
- Kingdom: Plantae
- Clade: Embryophytes
- Clade: Tracheophytes
- Clade: Gymnosperms
- Division: Pinophyta
- Class: Pinopsida
- Order: Araucariales
- Family: Araucariaceae
- Genus: Agathis
- Species: A. robusta
- Subspecies: A. r. subsp. nesophila

Trinomial name
- Agathis robusta subsp. nesophila Whitmore (1980)

Synonyms
- Agathis spathulata de Laub. (1988)

Species of conifer

Agathis robusta subsp. nesophila, the New Guinea kauri, is a subspecies of conifer native to the highlands of Papua New Guinea. It grows in the Eastern Highlands and Owen Stanley Range of eastern New Guinea and the highlands of New Britain at elevations of 900–1980 m. Although long known, it has only relatively recently (1980) been described as a subspecies of Agathis robusta, in the family Araucariaceae. It is also known by the synonym Agathis spathulata. It is threatened by habitat loss.

It is a large evergreen tree growing up to 60 m tall. The leaves are in decussate opposite pairs, 7–10 cm long and 18–30 mm broad on mature trees, up to 13 cm long and 45 mm broad on young trees. The cones are oval, 8.5–10 cm long and 6.5-7.5 cm diameter, and disintegrate at maturity to release the winged seeds.
