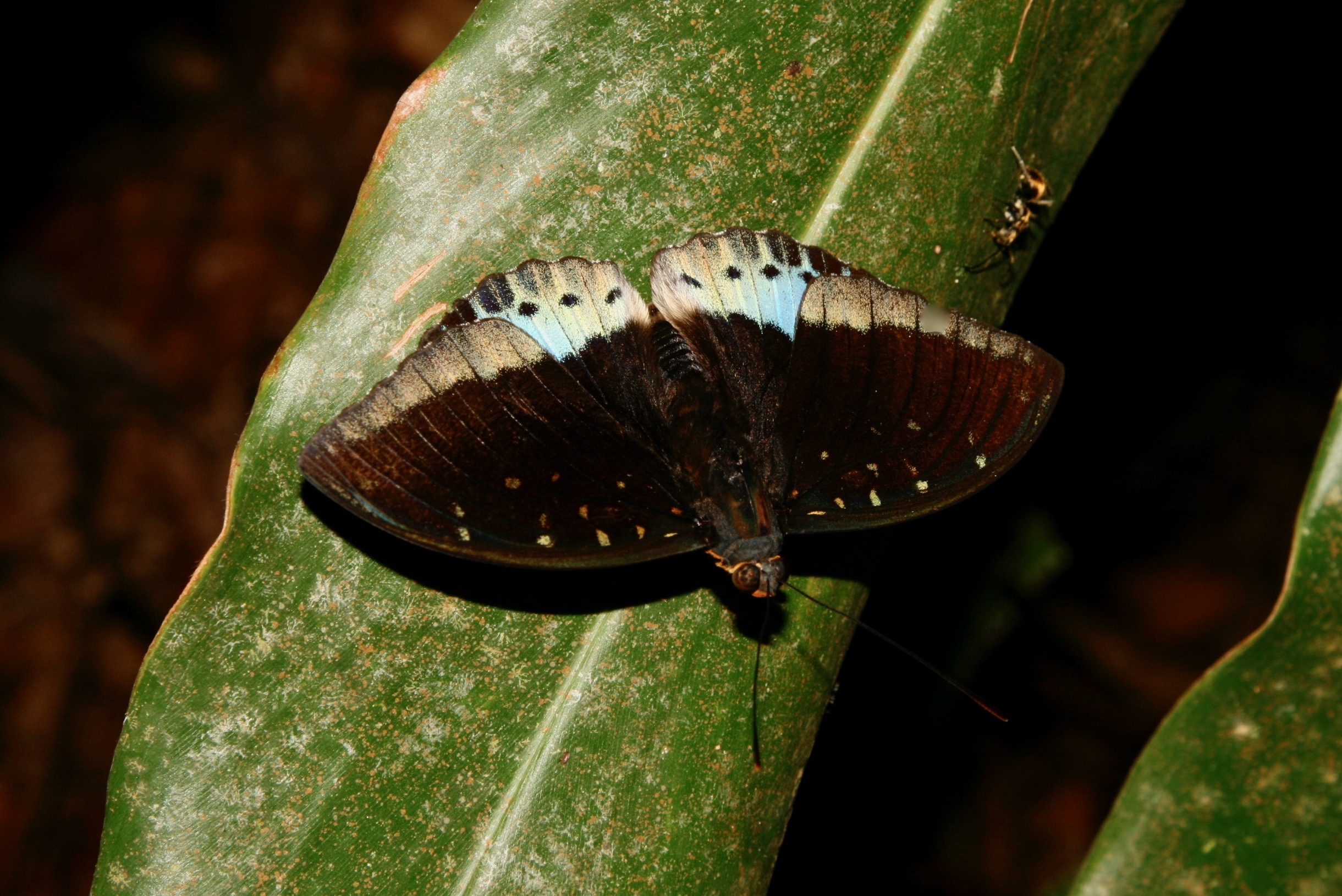
- Male – dorsal view
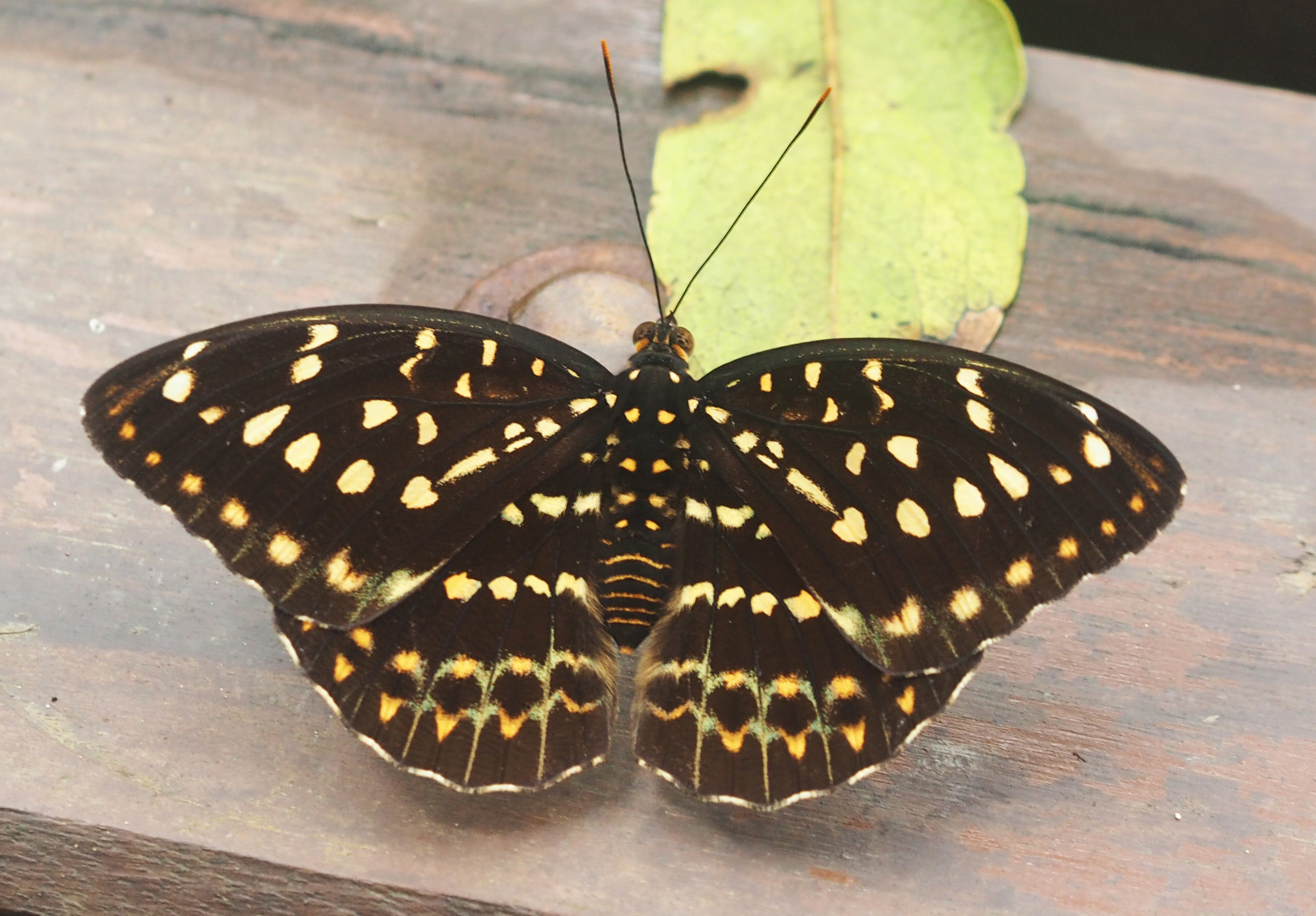
- Female – dorsal view

Scientific classification
- Kingdom: Animalia
- Phylum: Arthropoda
- Class: Insecta
- Order: Lepidoptera
- Family: Nymphalidae
- Genus: Lexias
- Species: L. pardalis

Binomial name
- Lexias pardalis Moore, 1878

Synonyms
- Symphaedra pardalis Moore, 1878

= Lexias pardalis =

Species of butterfly

Lexias pardalis, the common archduke, is a butterfly of the family Nymphalidae.

== Subspecies ==
Subspecies include:

- L. p. pardalis (Hainan)
- L. p. jadeitina (Fruhstorfer, 1913) (north-eastern India, Cambodia, Burma – northern Thailand, southern Yunnan)
- L. p. eleanor (Fruhstorfer, 1898) (southern China, Laos, Vietnam)
- L. p. nephritica (Fruhstorfer, 1913) (Sumatra)
- L. p. nasiensis Tsukada, 1991 (Nias)
- L. p. gigantea (Fruhstorfer, 1898) (Nias)
- L. p. pallidulus Tsukada, 1991 (Musala Island)
- L. p. dirteana (Corbet, 1941) (Singapore)
- L. p. ritsemae (Fruhstorfer, 1906) (Bangka)
- L. p. silawa (Fruhstorfer, 1913) (Belitung)
- L. p. nigricans Hanafusa, 1989 (Karimata)
- L. p. borneensis Tsukada, 1991 (Borneo, Natuna, Laut)
- L. p. cavarna (Fruhstorfer, 1913) (Philippines, Balabac)
- L. p. tethys Tsukada, 1991 (Philippines, Palawan)
- L. p. ellora (Fruhstorfer, 1898) (Philippines, Mindoro)
- L. p. saifuli Hanafusa, 1992

Lexias pardalis at the Bukit Timah Nature Reserve – Singapore. Video Clip

== Distribution ==
This species can be found in the Indomalayan realm.

== Habitat ==
Lexias pardalis prefer paths, clearings and edges of primary forests and they are easily sighted in sunny areas standing on the forest floor.

== Description ==
Lexias pardalis has a wingspan reaching about 80–90 millimetres (3.1–3.5 in). This species exhibits a strong sexual dimorphism, with very different pattern and colour. The upperside of the wings of the male are black with shimmering greenish-blue margins, especially in the hindwings. The uppersides of the cryptic wings of the larger females are dark brown with several rows of yellow spots, a pale green pattern on the lower wings. The wing pattern of yellow spots continue across the thorax and the abdomen.

The undersides in the males are brownish with whitish spots, while in the female the forewings are dark brown and the hindwings are pale bluish green, with whitish spots in both wings. The apical portion of the antennae are yellow orange in both sexes, while in the very similar species Lexias dirtea the clubs are black.

== Biology ==
Larvae feed on Cratoxylum formosum and Cratoxylum cochinchinense, while adults mainly feed on rotting fruits, especially in the genus Garcinia, but also on nectar of flowers. Caterpillars of the last instars are pale green and have many spines radiating from the body. Also the chrysalis is pale green.

== Gallery ==
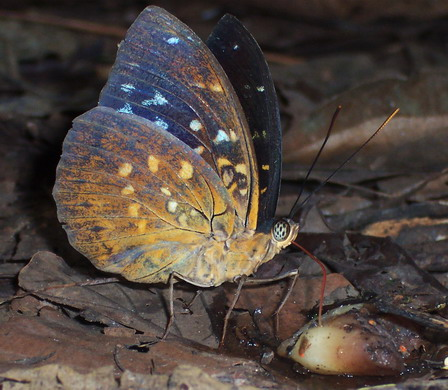
Ventral view

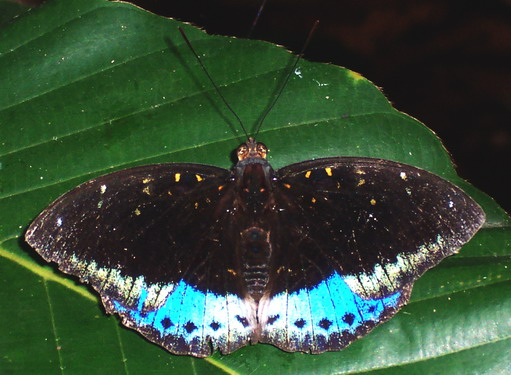
Male - dorsal view

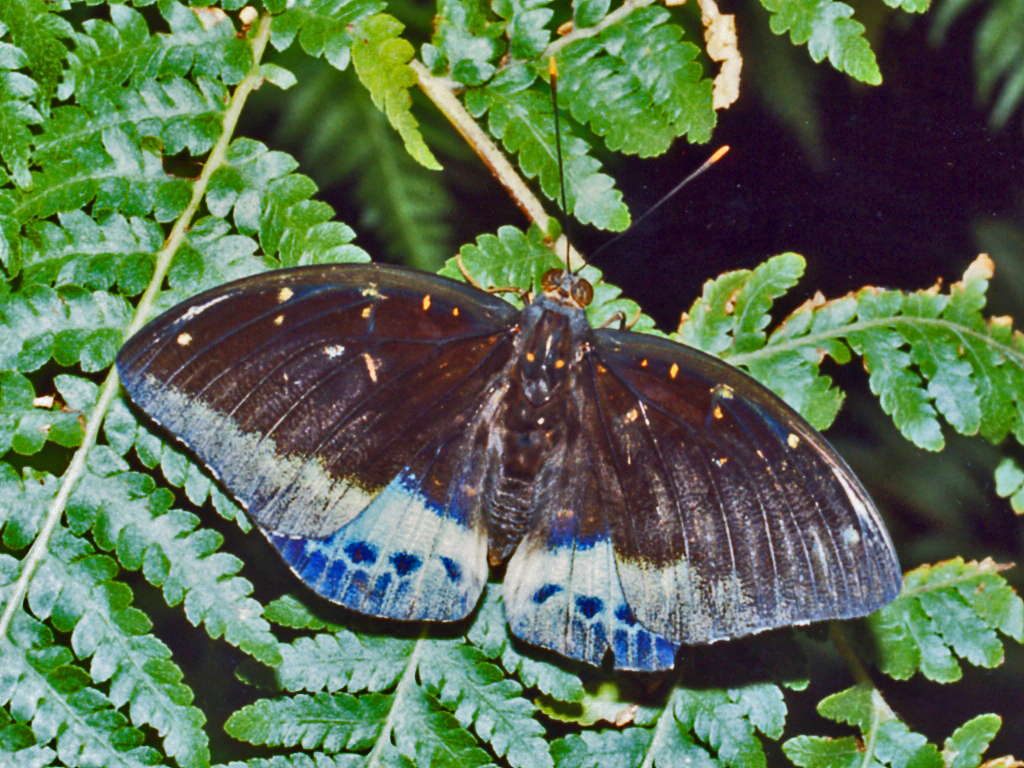
Male - dorsal view

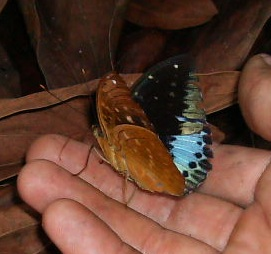
Male - ventral view - Sumatra, Indonesia

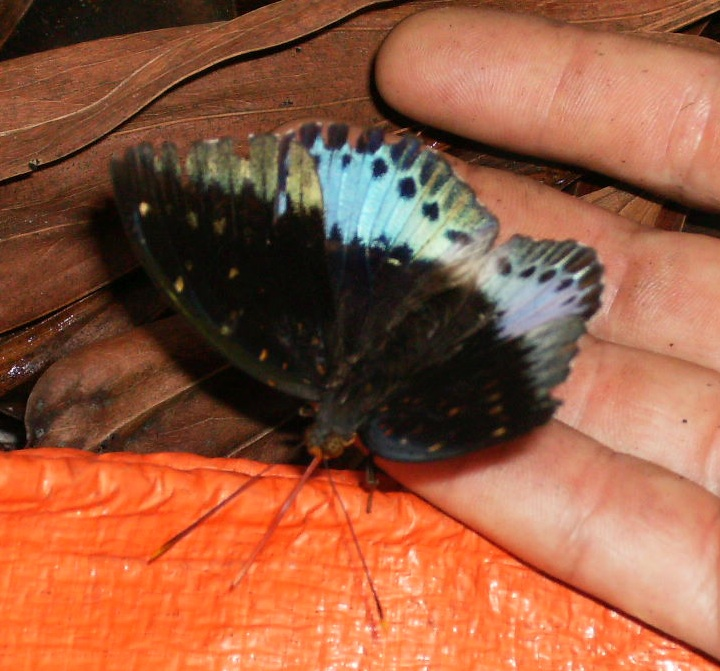
Male - dorsal view - Sumatra, Indonesia

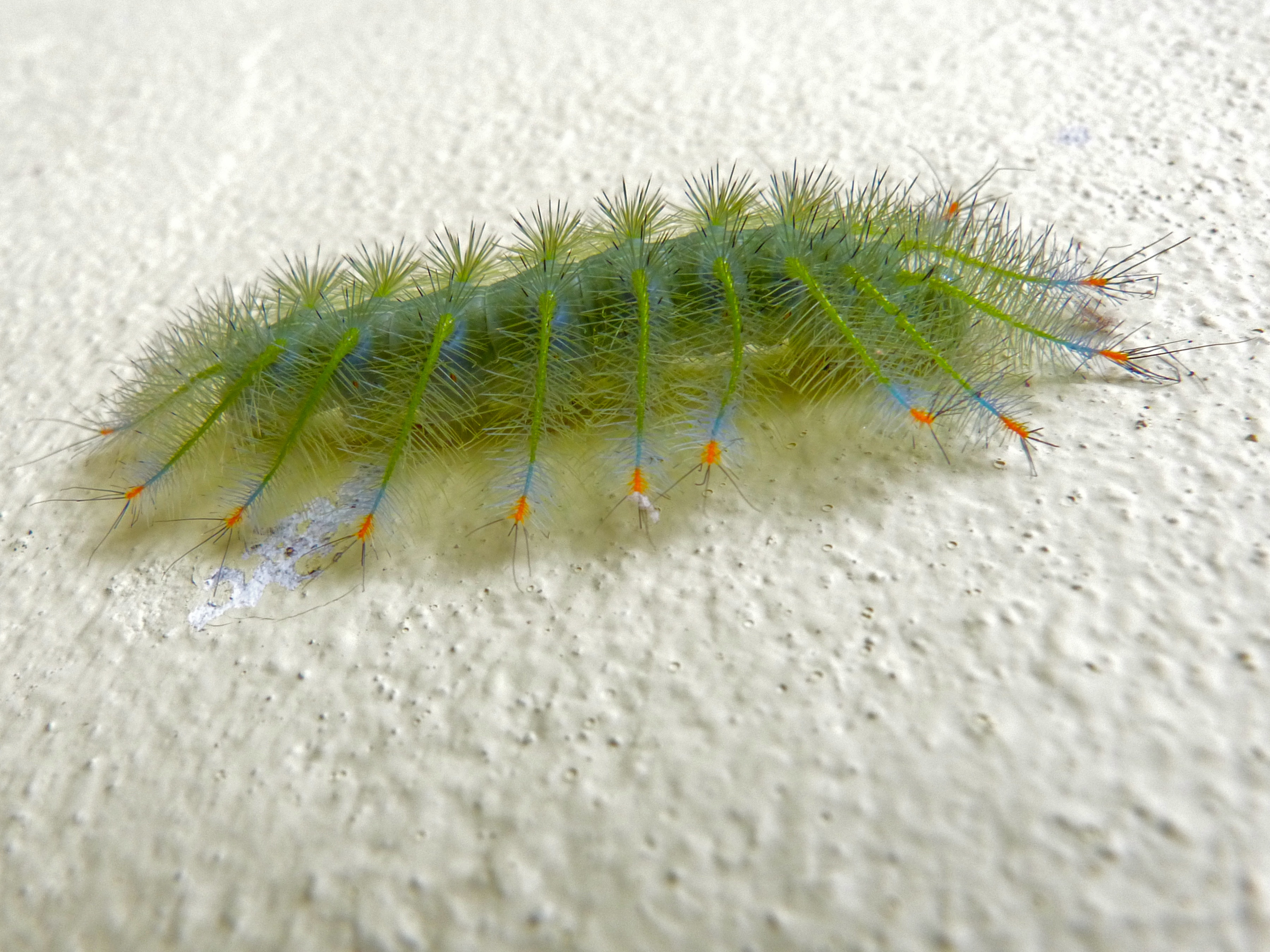
Caterpillar, Malaysia
