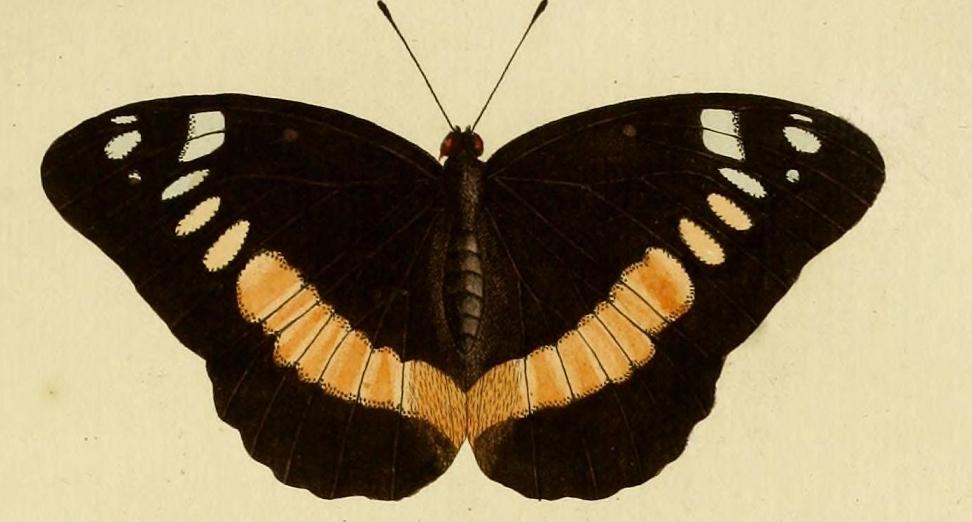

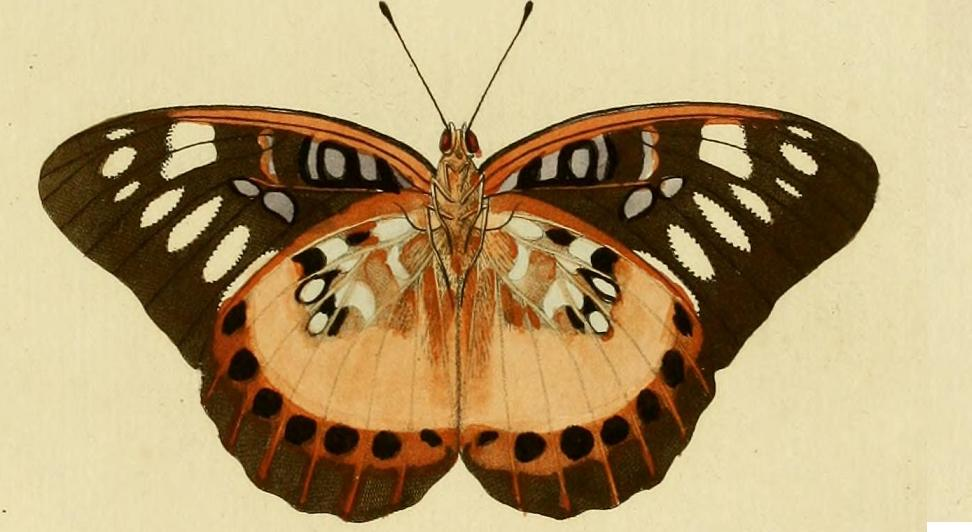

Scientific classification
- Kingdom: Animalia
- Phylum: Arthropoda
- Class: Insecta
- Order: Lepidoptera
- Family: Nymphalidae
- Genus: Lexias
- Species: L. aeropa

Binomial name
- Lexias aeropa (Linnaeus, 1758)

Synonyms
- Papilio aeropa Linnaeus, 1758; Papilio aeropus Linnaeus, 1767; Papilio aeropus Linnaeus, 1764; Papilio nodrica Boisduval, 1832; Adolias (Lexias) aeropus ab. bicolorata Strand, 1913; Adolias (Lexias) aeropus ab. lutescentitincta Strand, 1913; Adolias (Lexias) aeropus ab. albinistica Strand, 1913; Euthalia aeropa choirilus Fruhstorfer, 1913; Euthalia aeropa eporidorix Fruhstorfer, 1913; Euthalia aeropa paisandrus Fruhstorfer, 1913; Euthalia aeropa helvidius Fruhstorfer, 1913; Euthalia aeropa eutychius Fruhstorfer, 1913; Euthalia ergena Fruhstorfer, 1913; Euthalia albifera Fruhstorfer, 1913; Euthalia midia Fruhstorfer, 1913; Euthalia mysolensis Talbot, 1932; Euthalia aeropa angustifascia Joicey & Noakes, 1915; Euthalia meforensis Talbot, 1932; Euthalia aeropa hegias Fruhstorfer, 1913; Euthalia aeropa orestias Fruhstorfer, 1913

= Lexias aeropa =

Species of butterfly

Lexias aeropa, the orange-banded plane, is a butterfly in the family Nymphalidae. It is found in South-East Asia and Australia.

Females have a wingspan of about 85 mm, making them larger than males with a wingspan of about 6 mm. The adults are dark brown with a broad orange band across each wing. The underside is similar, but paler and rather mottled.

The larvae feed on Calophyllum species.

== Subspecies ==
The following subspecies are recognised:

- L. a. aeropa (southern Moluccas: Ambon, Ceram, Saparua)
- L. a. angustifascia (Joicey & Noakes, 1915) (Biak, Yapen Islands)
- L. a. choirilus (Fruhstorfer, 1913) (Waigeu)
- L. a. eporidorix (Fruhstorfer, 1913) (northern Moluccas: Bachan, Halmahera, Morotai)
- L. a. eutychius (Fruhstorfer, 1913) (Aru, Kai, West Irian to Papua, Karkar Island, Cape York)
- L. a. hegias (Fruhstorfer, 1913) (Bismarck Archipelago: New Britain, New Ireland)
- L. a. helvidius (Fruhstorfer, 1913) (Buru)
- L. a. orestias (Fruhstorfer, 1913) (Sula Islands: Taliabu, Mangoly, possibly Sanana)
- L. a. paisandrus (Fruhstorfer, 1913) (Moluccas: Obi)
