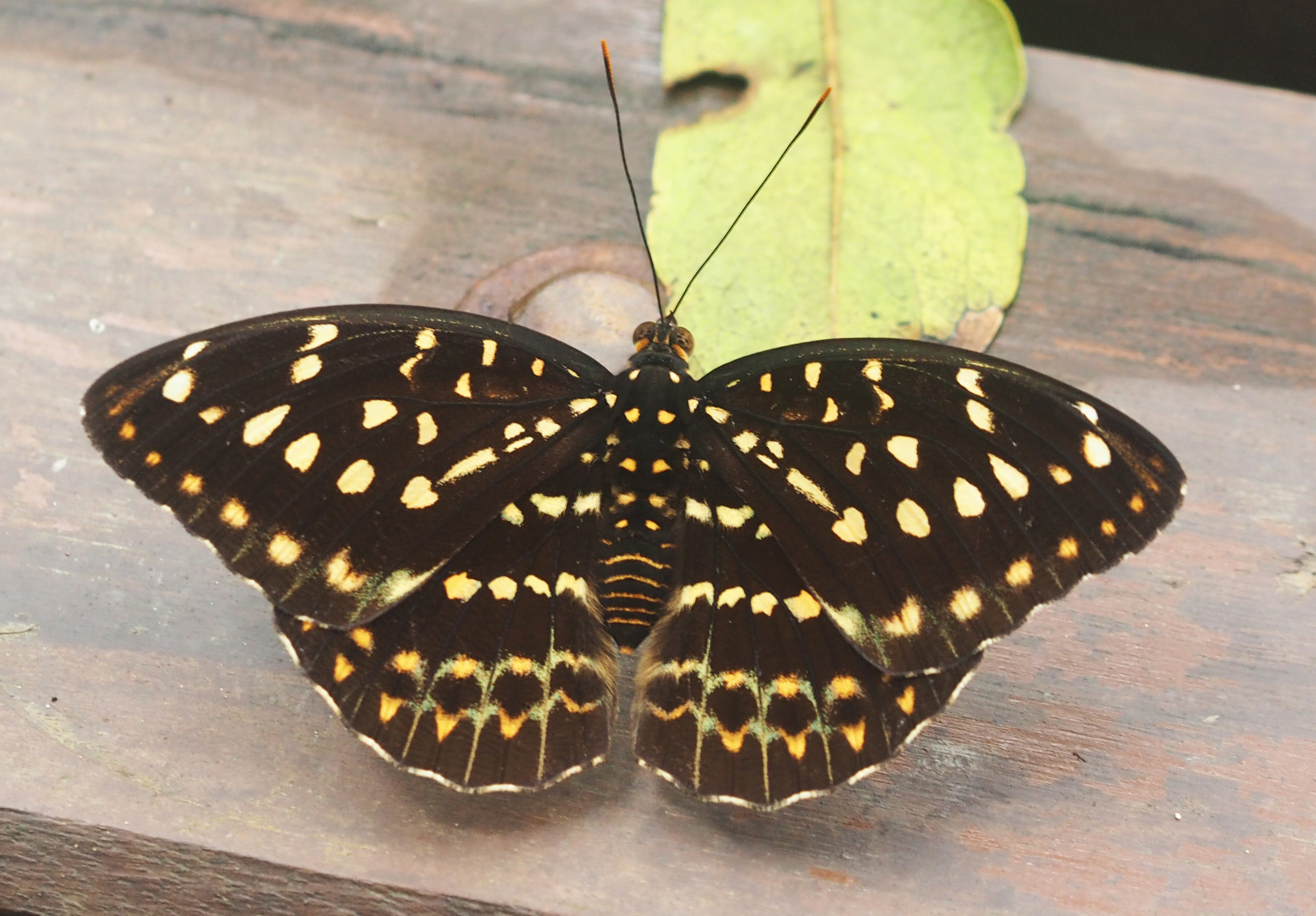
- Common archduke (female)

Scientific classification
- Kingdom: Animalia
- Phylum: Arthropoda
- Clade: Pancrustacea
- Class: Insecta
- Order: Lepidoptera
- Family: Nymphalidae
- Subfamily: Limenitidinae
- Tribe: Adoliadini
- Genus: Lexias; Boisduval, 1832

Species
- See text

= Archduke (butterfly) =

Archdukes

Members of brush-footed butterfly genus Lexias

The archdukes are a genus, Lexias, of tropical forest-dwelling butterflies that are common throughout Southeast Asia and Australasia. Members of the brush-footed butterfly family Nymphalidae, the genus is represented by about 17 species. Two very similar and coexisting genera are Tanaecia (the viscounts and earls) and Euthalia (the barons and counts), the latter previously including some Lexias species. The largest species reach a wingspan of about 10 cm (4 in).

== Description ==
Lexias pardalis and L. dirtea are also among the most colourful archdukes. Sexual dichromatism is however extreme, with the two sexes appearing entirely different. The males' dorsal wing surfaces are a dramatic combination of velvety black forewings and metallic blue green to violet covering the margins of the forewings and hindwings. The females' dorsal wing surfaces are a drab brown, with small yellowish white spots. Both sexes have drab ventral wings, presumably as a means of camouflage. The dramatic colours of the males are thought to play a role in intraspecies communication, both by signalling to other males when defending territory, and by attracting females.

L. pardalis and L. dirtea, two commonly farmed species, are nearly identical and often confused, but they can be distinguished by their differing antennae: the dorsal surface of L. pardalis' antennae tips are yellow orange, whereas they are black in L. dirtea.

== Life cycle ==
Caterpillars of the genus are protected from predators by their long spinous bristles. Archduke chrysalids are pale green and angular in shape; they may be up to 30 mm in length. Calophyllum trees are host to the caterpillars of Southeast Asian archdukes.

The observed readiness of Southeast Asian species to feed on both decaying fruit (of Garcinia tree species) and the nectar of flowers suggests that these species inhabit the forest periphery. Because both types of food are common in this habitat, the Southeast Asian archdukes have not become specialised in feeding on one or the other, as is usual in butterflies. Archdukes are found primarily in virgin forests and are attracted to sunlit areas such as clearings and paths.

== Butterfly farming ==
Several archduke species are raised in large numbers on butterfly farms for the specimen collecting market and for live sale to butterfly conservatories. The most commonly farmed species are L. pardalis and L. dirtea.

== Species ==
In alphabetical order:

- Lexias acutipenna Chou & Li, 1994
- Lexias aeetes (Hewitson, 1861)
- Lexias aegle (Doherty, 1891)
- Lexias aeropa (Linnaeus, 1758) – orange-banded plane
- Lexias albopunctata (Crowley, 1895)
- Lexias bangkana (Hagen, 1892)
- Lexias canescens (Butler, [1869]) - yellow archduke
- Lexias cyanipardus (Butler, [1869]) – great archduke
- Lexias damalis (Erichson, 1834)
- Lexias dirtea (Fabricius, 1793) – archduke
- Lexias elna (van de Poll, 1895)
- Lexias hikarugenzi Tsukada & Nishiyama, 1980
- Lexias immaculata (Snellen, 1890)
- Lexias panopus C. & R. Felder, 1861
- Lexias pardalis (Moore, 1878)
- Lexias perdix (Butler, 1884)
- Lexias satrapes C. & R. Felder, 1861

=== Images ===
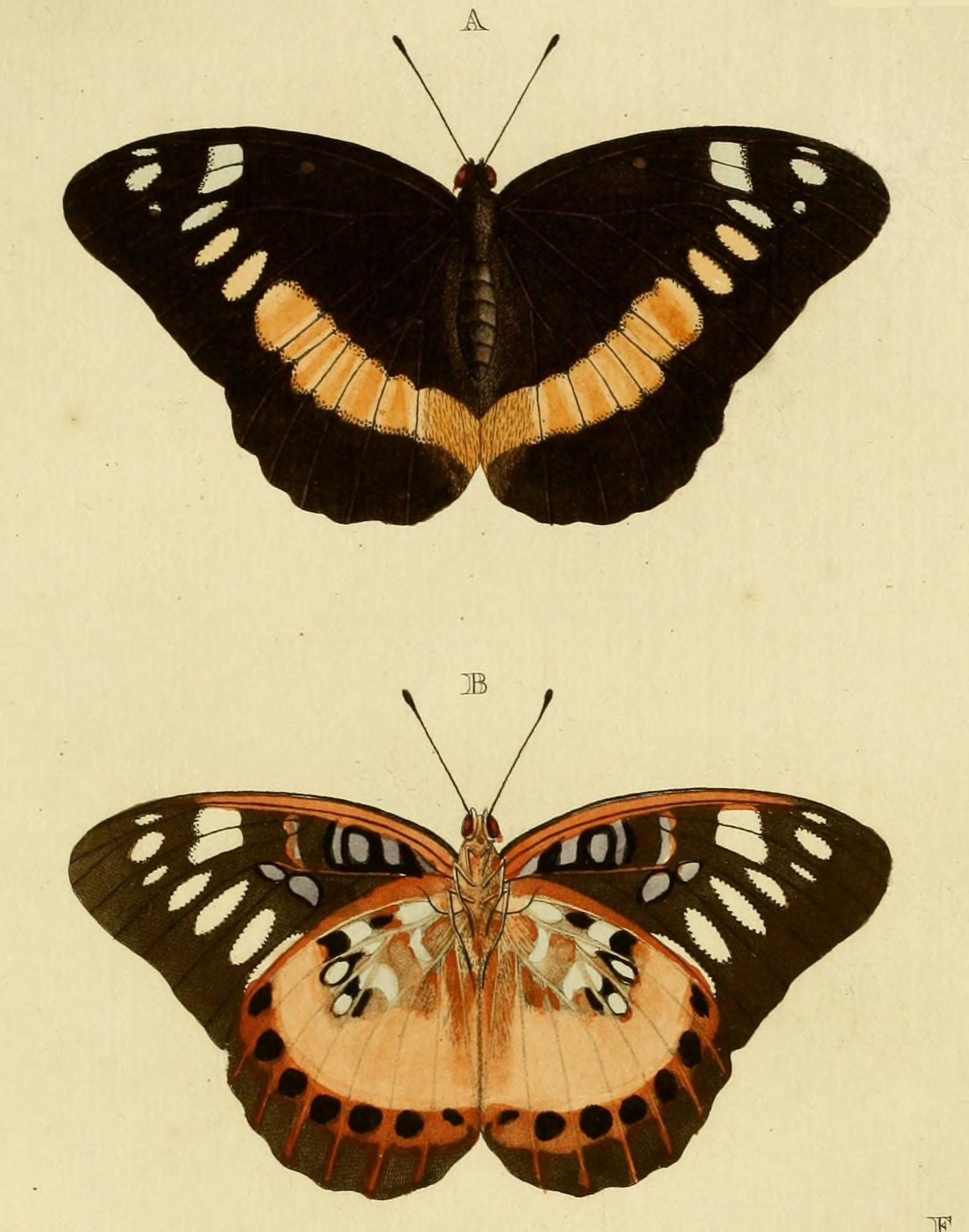
L. aeropa

L. satrapes

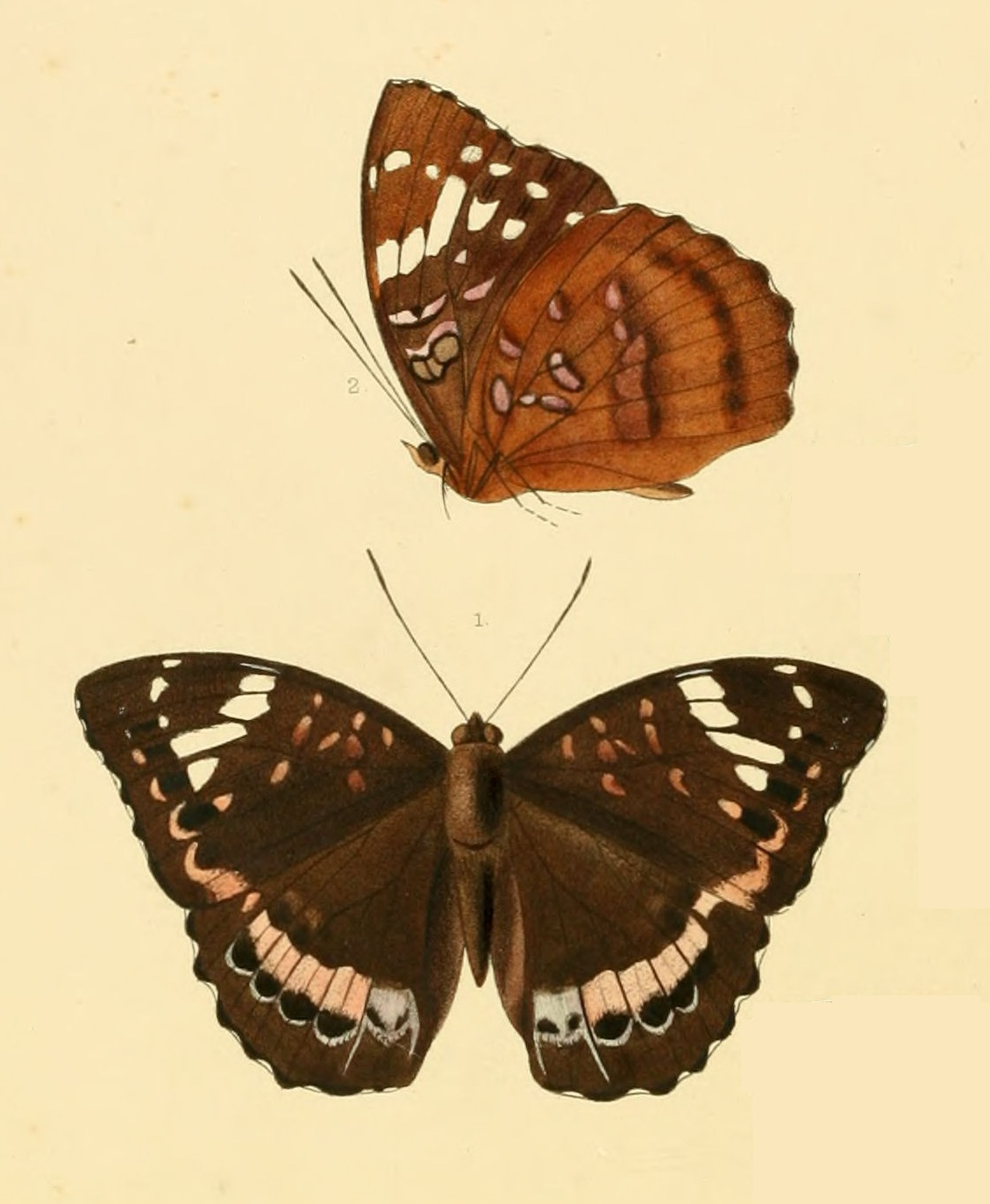
L. aeetes

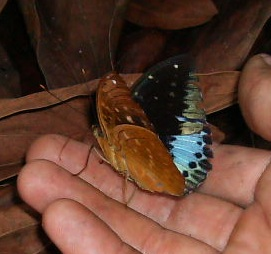
L. pardalis (male)

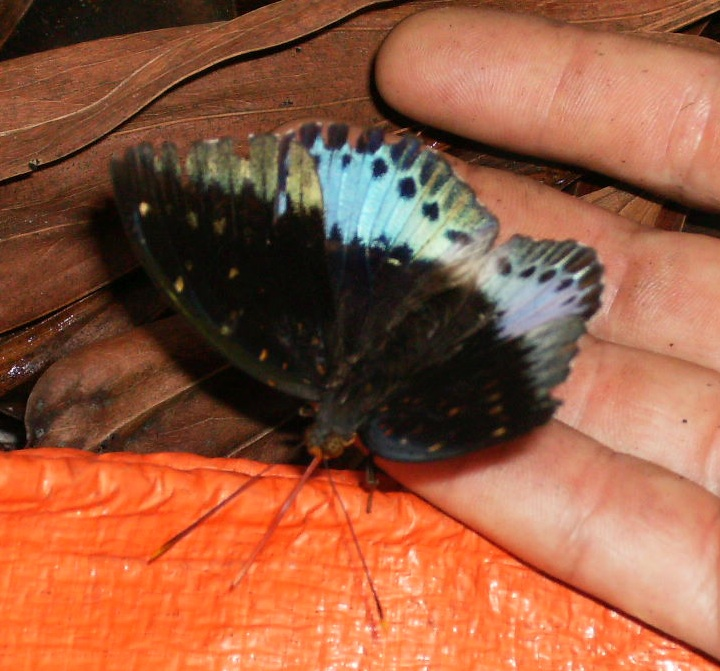
L. pardalis (male)

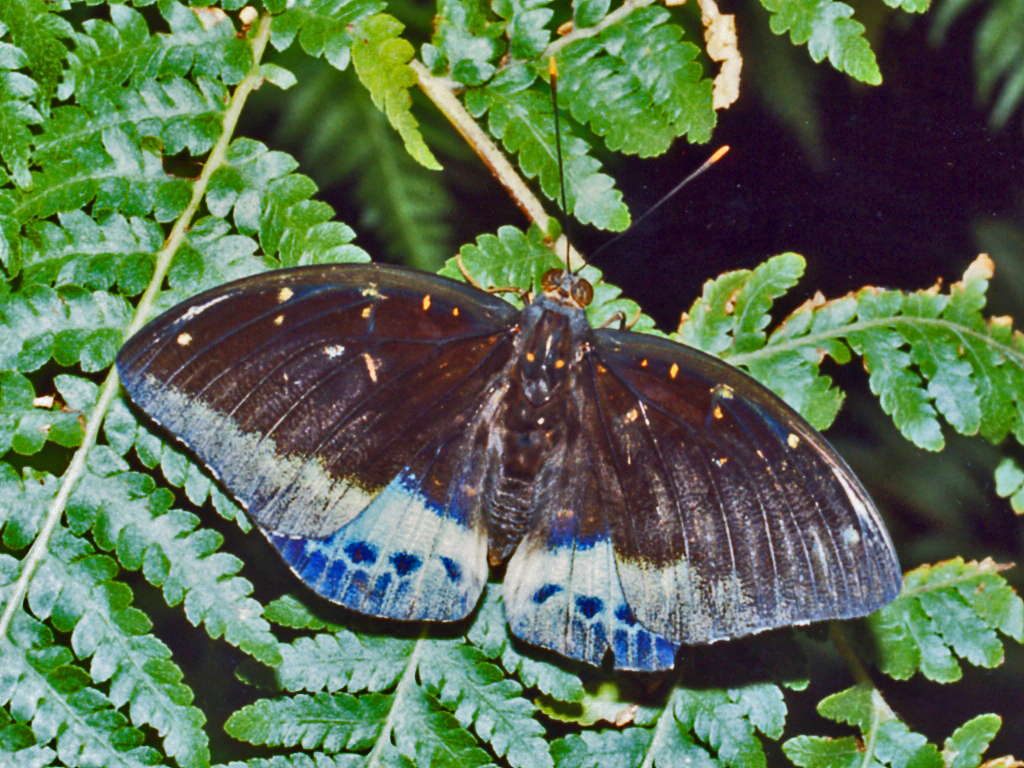
L. pardalis (male)

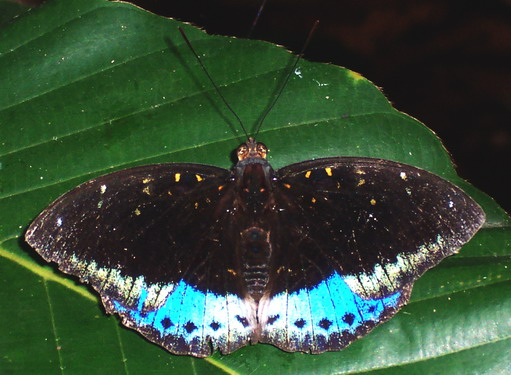
L. pardalis (male)

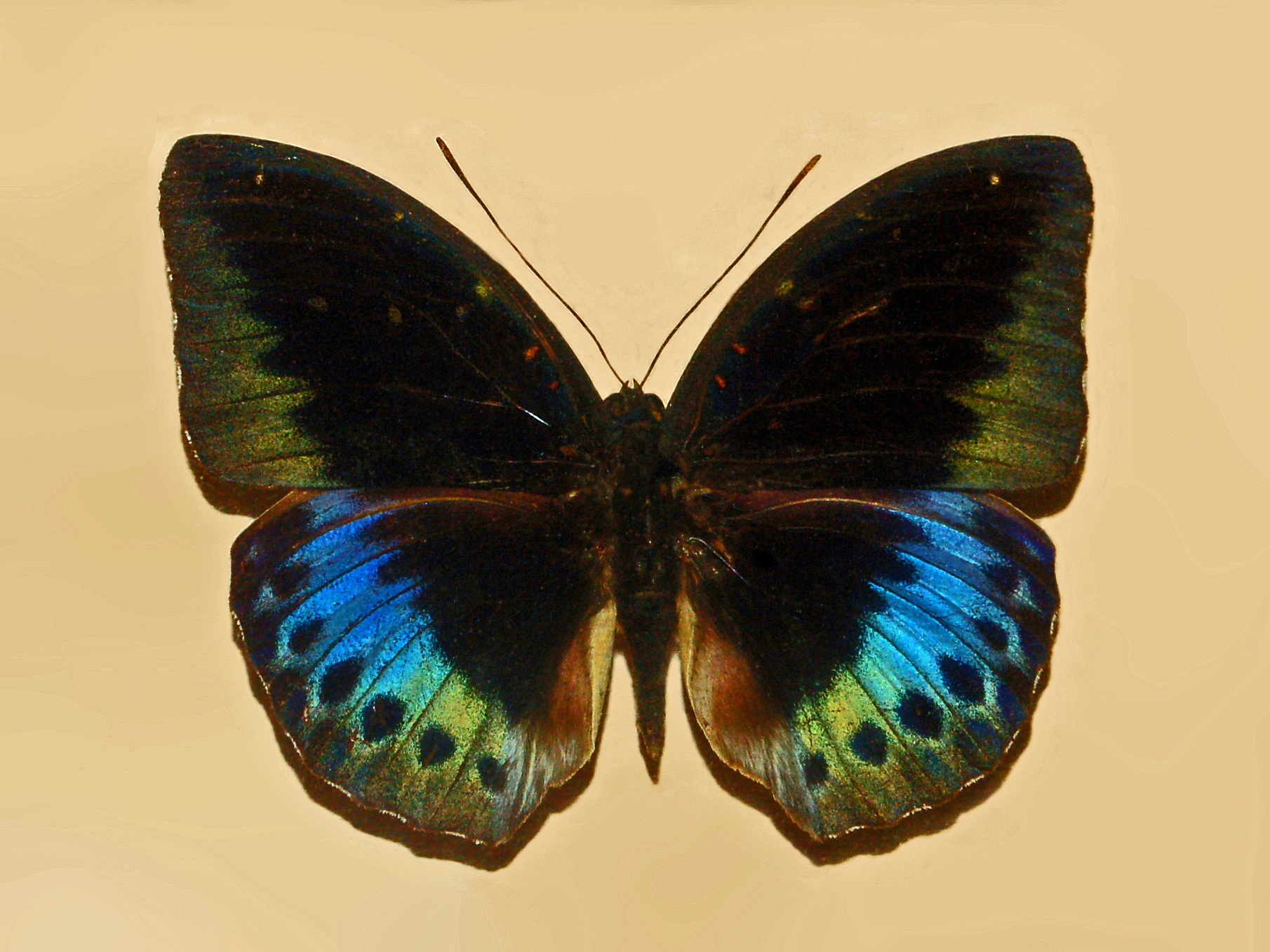
L. dirtea (male)

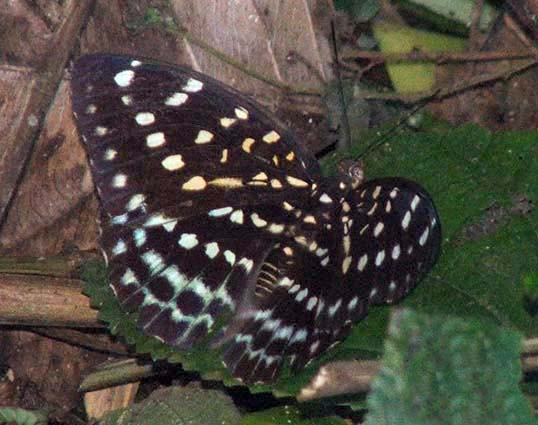
L. dirtea (female)

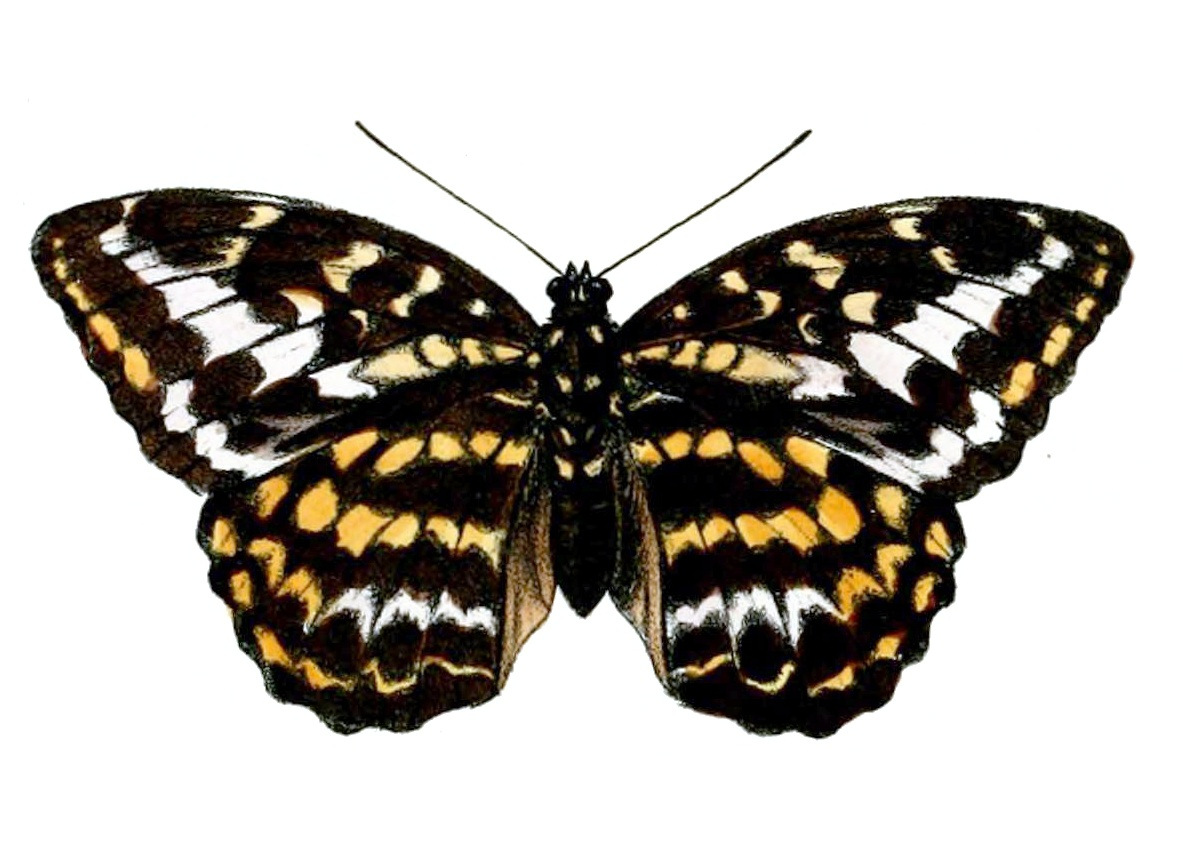
L. canescens (female)

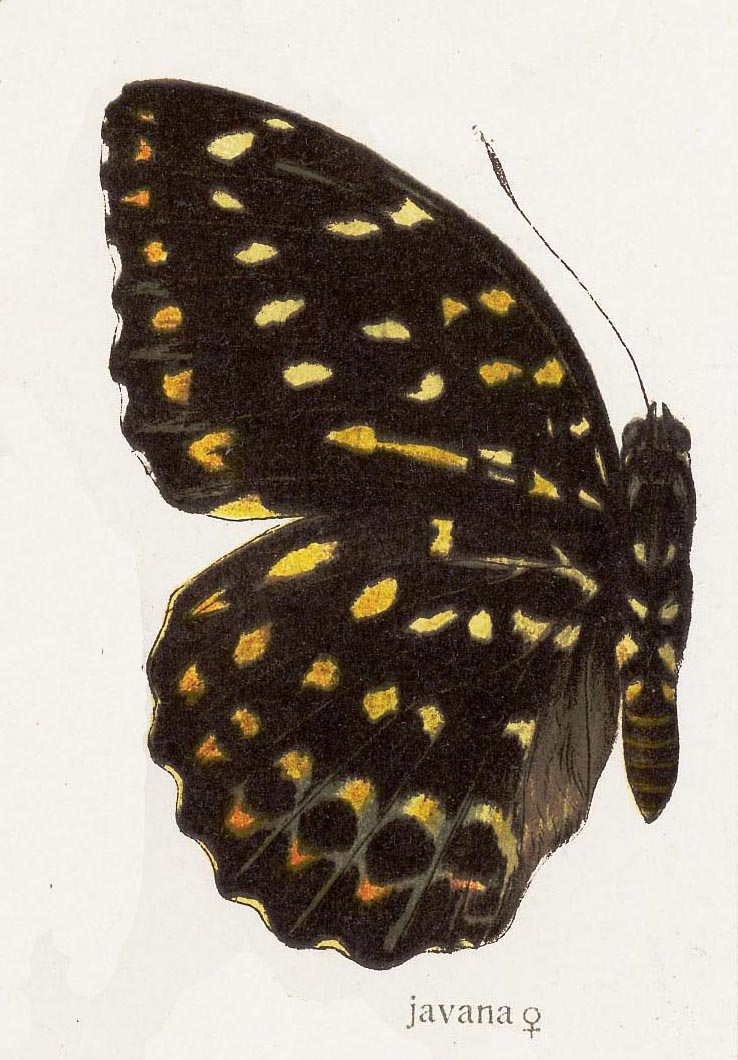
L. dirtea javana (female)

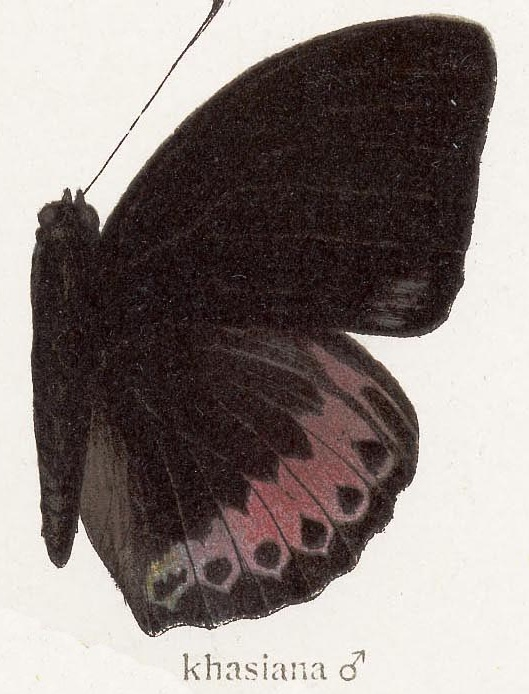
L. dirtea khasiana (male)

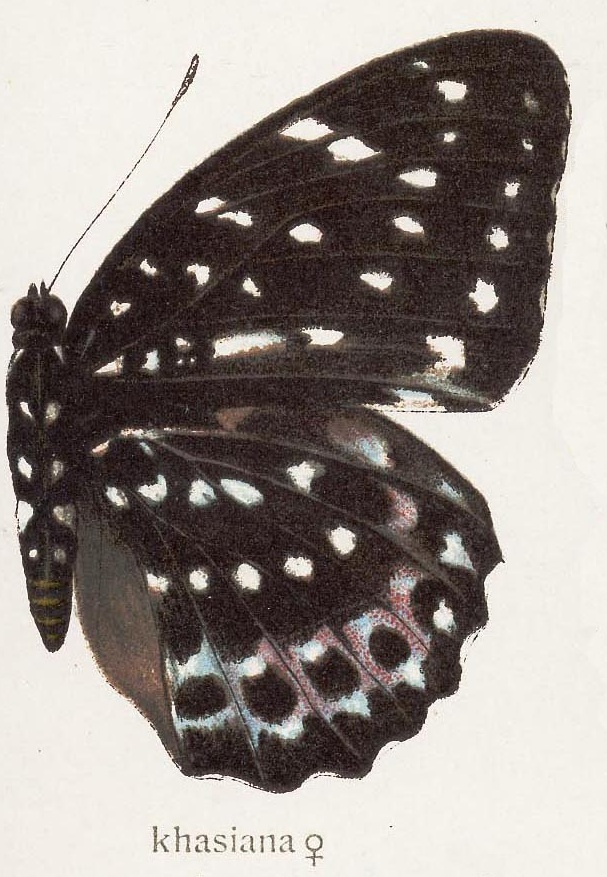
L. dirtea khasiana (female)

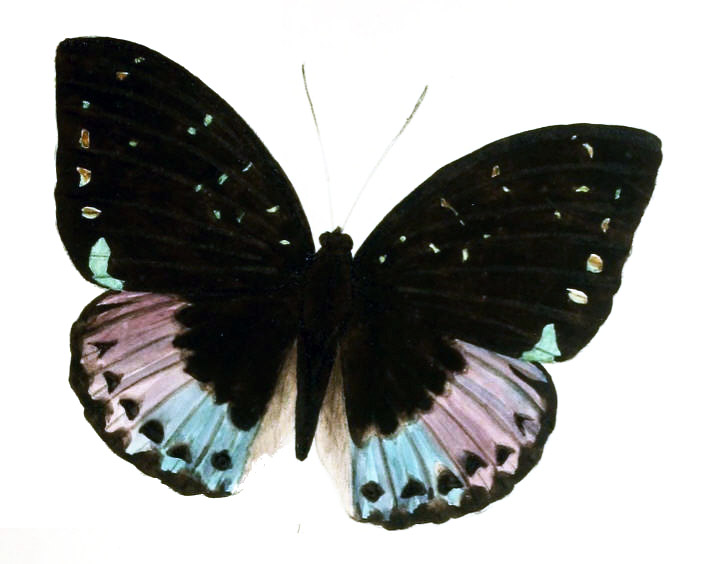
L. cyanipardus (male)

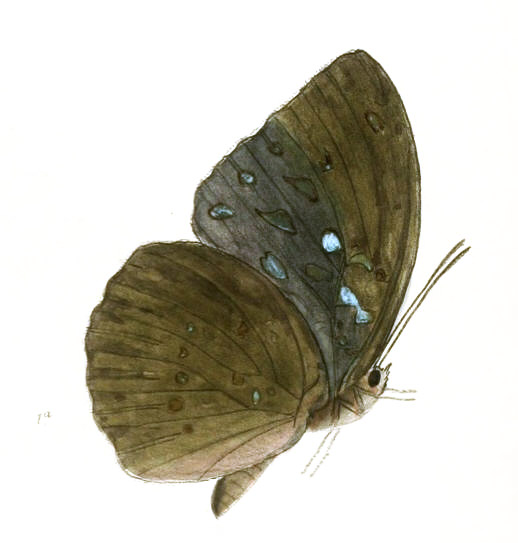
L. cyanipardus

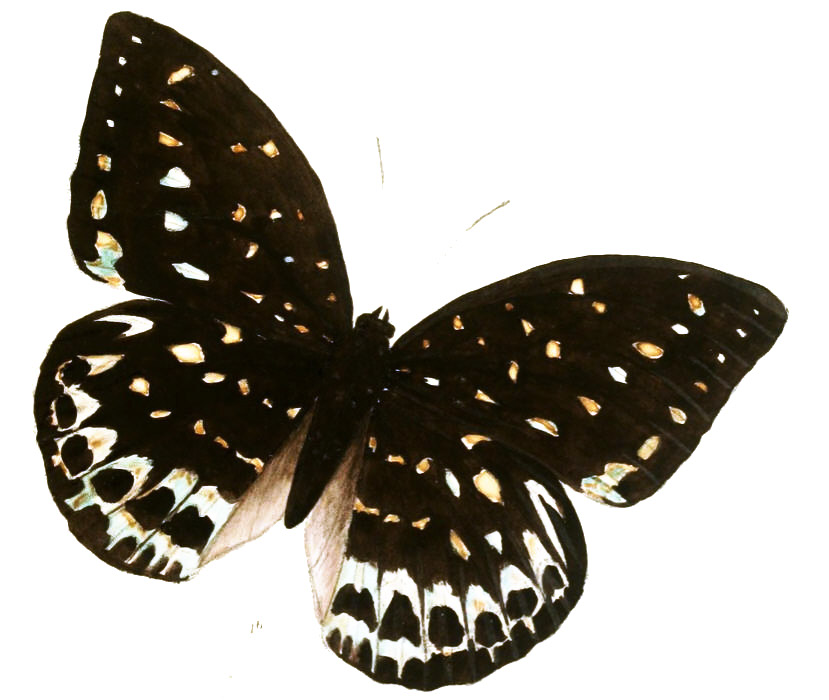
L. cyanipardus (female)

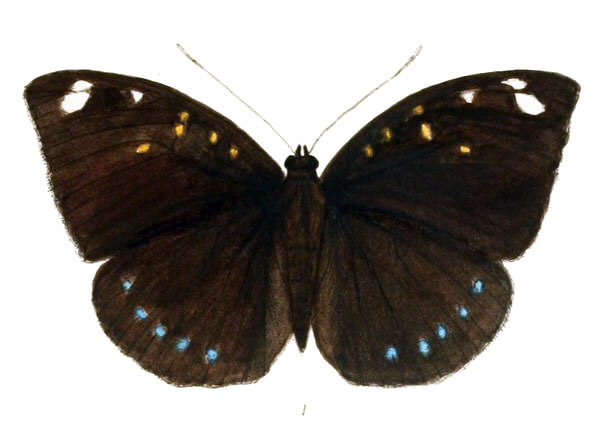
L. albopunctata (male)

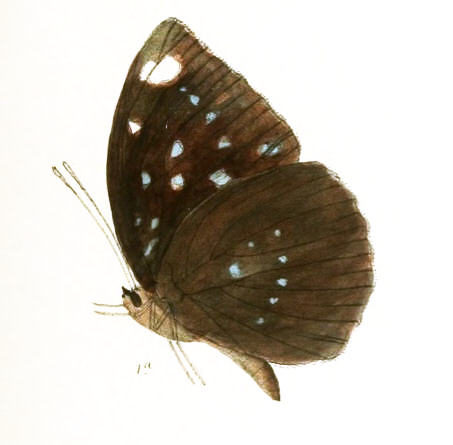
L. albopunctata

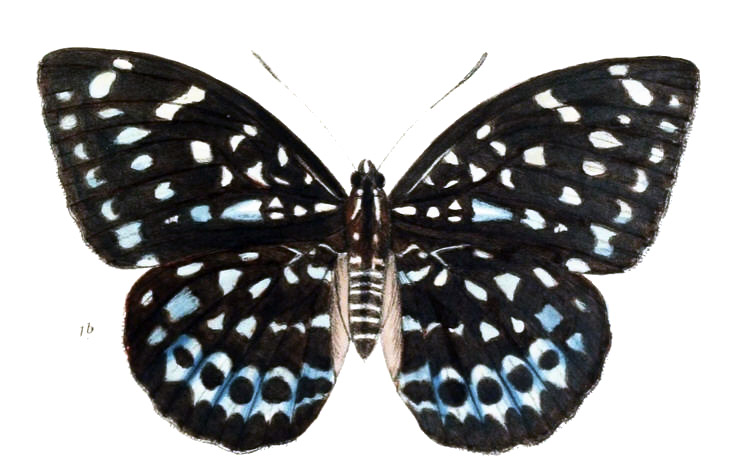
L. albopunctata (female)

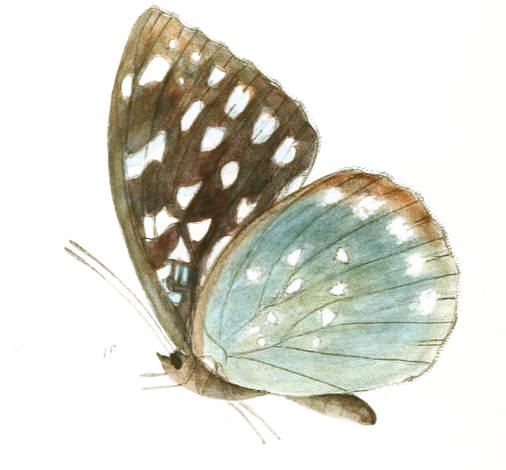
L. albopunctata

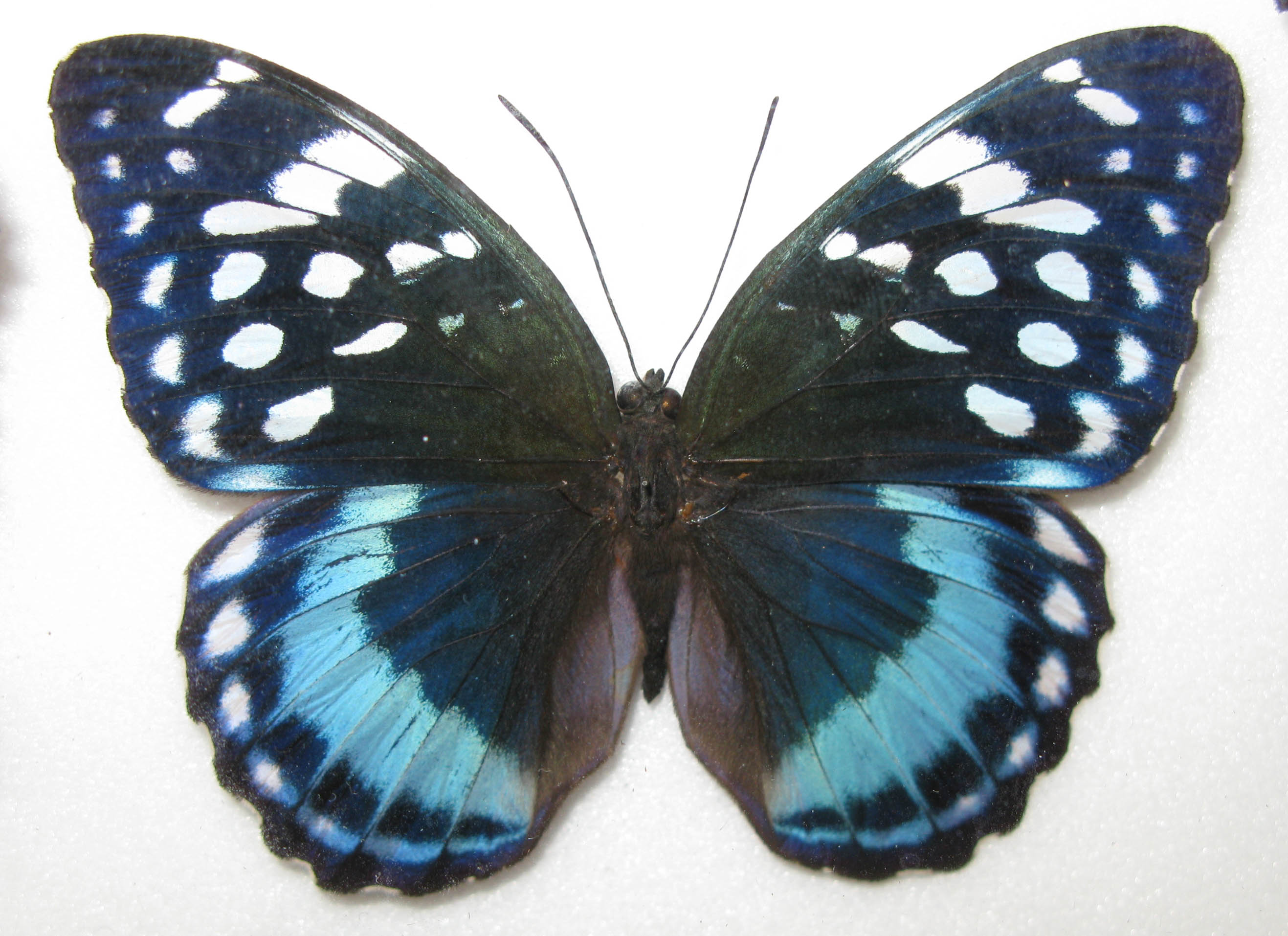
L. satrapes (male)
