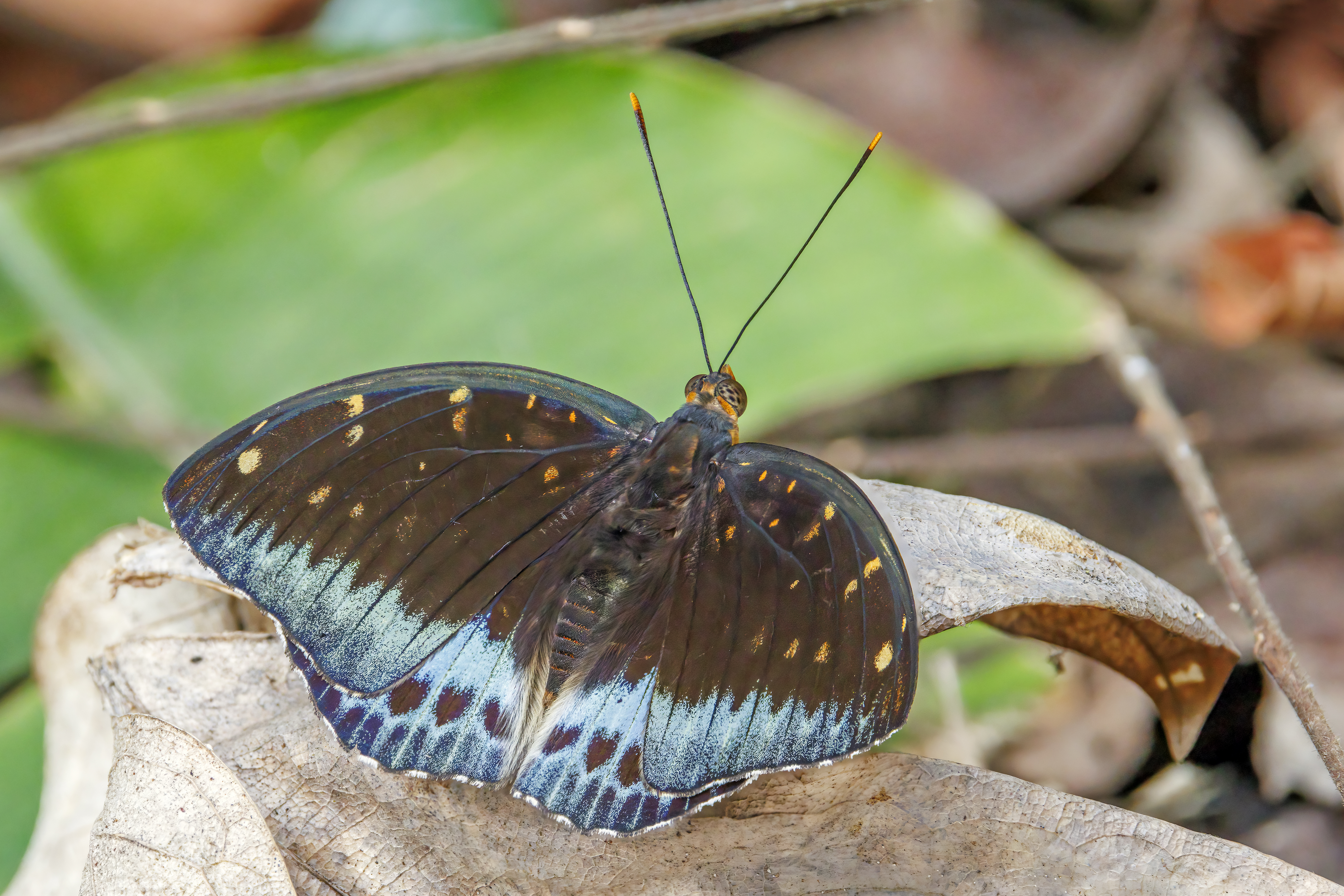
- Lexias dirtea agosthena, male, Laos
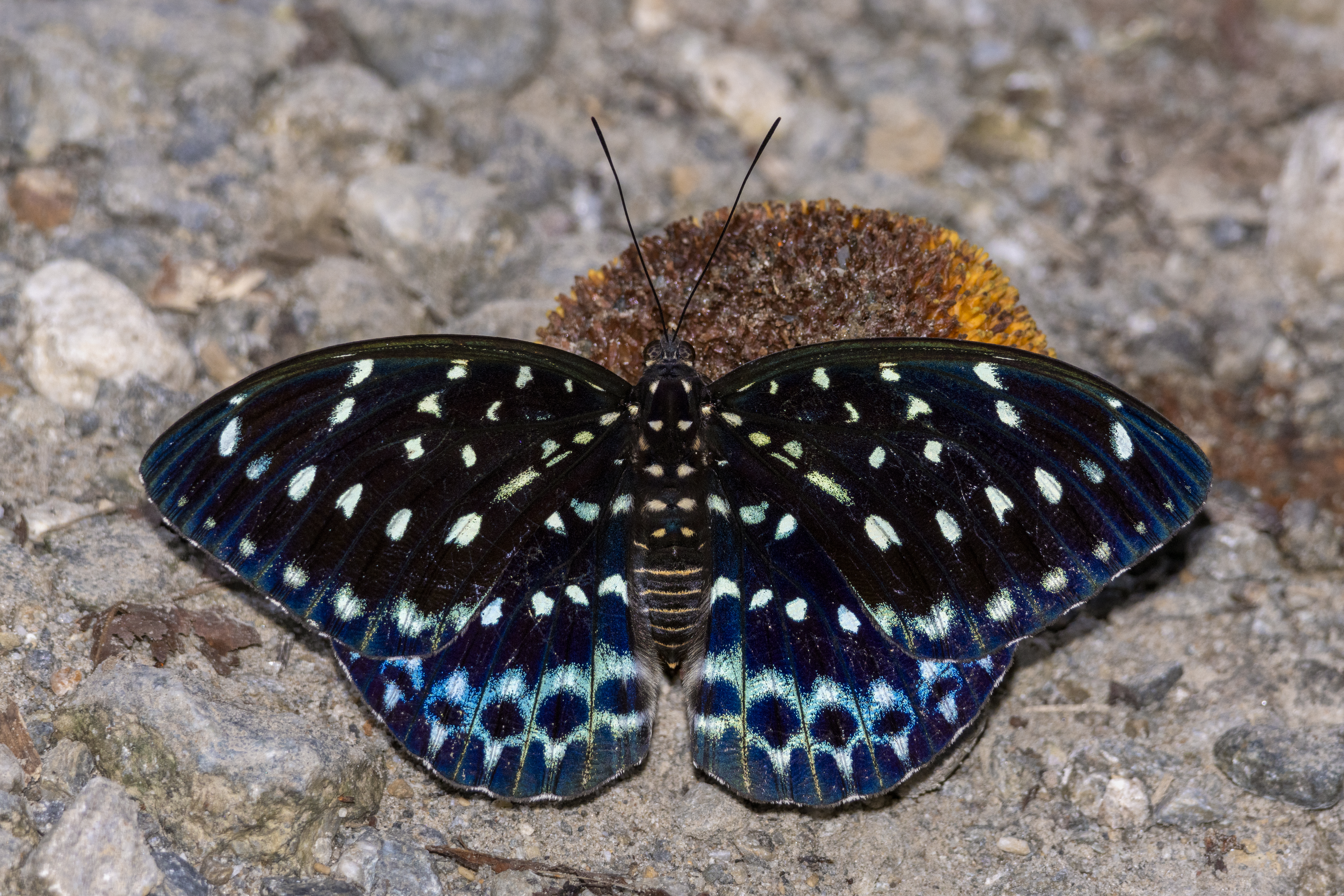
- Female

Scientific classification
- Kingdom: Animalia
- Phylum: Arthropoda
- Class: Insecta
- Order: Lepidoptera
- Family: Nymphalidae
- Genus: Lexias
- Species: L. dirtea

Binomial name
- Lexias dirtea Fabricius, 1793

Synonyms
- Euthalia dirtea (Fabricius, 1793); Papilio dirtea Fabricius, 1793

= Lexias dirtea =

Species of butterfly

Lexias dirtea, the archduke, is a species of butterfly of the family Nymphalidae.

== Description ==
Lexias dirtea has a wingspan of about 80–100 millimetres (3.1–3.9 in). In this species sexual dichromatism is extreme. In males the uppersides of the wings are mainly velvety black, with metallic blue green on the margins, while in the females the uppersides of the wings are mainly brownish, covered by several rows of yellowish-whitish spots.

== Distribution ==
This species can be found in India, Burma, Northern Thailand, southern China, Laos, Cambodia, Vietnam, Myanmar, Malaysia, Sumatra, Java, Borneo and the Philippines.

== Habitat ==
It lives primarily in virgin swamp forests.

== Subspecies ==
- L. d. dirtea (north-east India, Naga Hills)
- L. d. khasiana (north-east India, Assam, Burma, Yunnan)
- L. d. toonchai (northern Thailand)
- L. d. agosthena southern China (Guangdong), Laos, Cambodia, Vietnam
- L. d. merguia (southern Myanmar, Tenasserim, southern Thailand, Malaysia)
- L. d. montana (Sumatra)
- L. d. inimitabilis (Siberut, Mentawei Islands)
- L. d. insulanus (Bangka, Lingga, Singkep)
- L. d. javana (western Java)
- L. d. aquilus (Anambas group)
- L. d. baliaris (Natuna Islands)
- L. d. chalcedonides (Borneo)
- L. d. annae (Bawean)
- L. d. palawana (Philippines, Palawan)
- ??L. d. iwasakii
- L. d. bontouxi (southern Yunnan)
