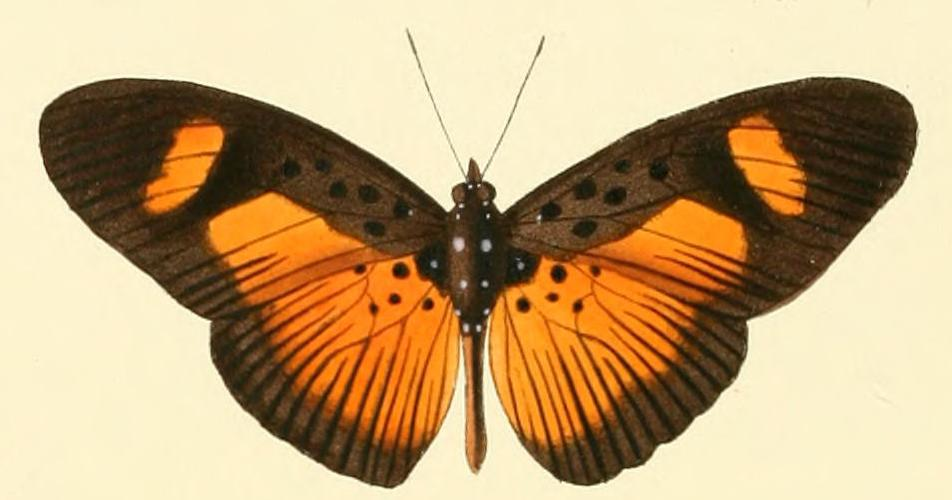

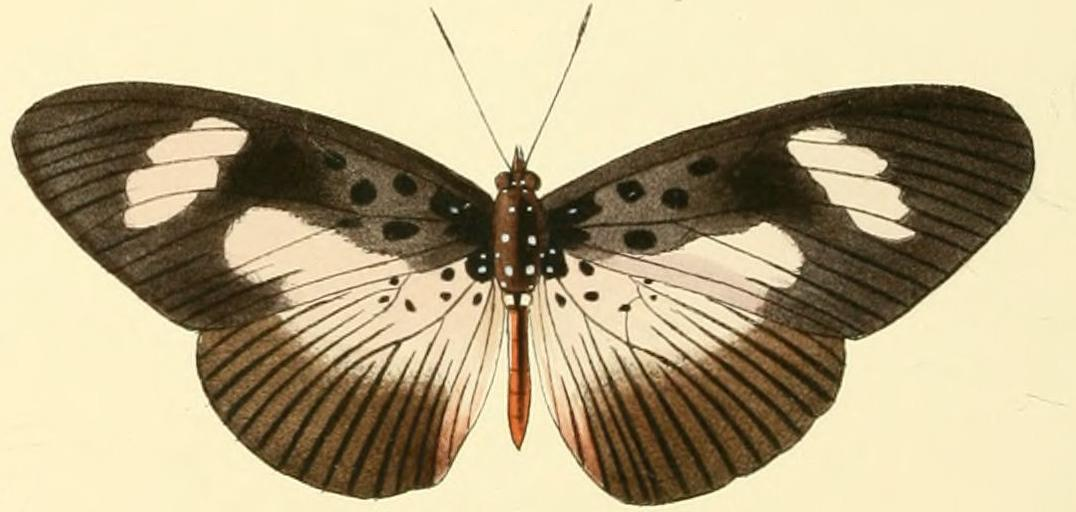

Scientific classification
- Kingdom: Animalia
- Phylum: Arthropoda
- Clade: Pancrustacea
- Class: Insecta
- Order: Lepidoptera
- Family: Nymphalidae
- Genus: Pseudacraea
- Species: P. eurytus

Binomial name
- Pseudacraea eurytus (Linnaeus, 1758)

Synonyms
- Papilio eurytus Linnaeus, 1758; Papilio hirce Drury, [1782]; Pseudacraea imitator Trimen, 1873; Diadema ruhama Hewitson, 1872; Pseudacraea simulator Butler, 1873; Pseudacraea fulvaria Butler, 1874; Pseudacraea striata Butler, 1874; Pseudacraea metaplanema Butler, 1874; Pseudacraea epigea Butler, 1874; Pseudacraea theorini Aurivillius, 1891; Pseudacraea theorini var. consanguinea Aurivillius, 1894; Pseudacraea eurytus ab. bicolor Aurivillius, 1899; Pseudacraea karschi Fruhstorfer, 1903; Pseudacraea hobleyi Neave, 1904; Pseudacraea tirikensis Neave, 1904; Pseudacraea terra Neave, 1904; Pseudacraea obscura Neave, 1904; Pseudacraea togoensis Bartel, 1905; Pseudacraea impleta Grünberg, 1910; Pseudacraea ruwenzorica Grünberg, 1911; Pseudacraea fickei f. occidentalis Aurivillius, 1912; Pseudacraea eurytus hobleyi f. poggeoides Poulton, 1913; Pseudacraea theorini ab. epigeoides Strand, 1914; Pseudacraea theorini ab. obtusidentata Strand, 1914; Pseudacraea ruhama ab. latefasciata Schultze, 1920; Pseudacraea eurytus f. opisthoxantha Carpenter, 1924; Pseudacraea eurytus f. kuenowoides Carpenter, 1930; Pseudacraea eurytus f. schubotzoides Carpenter, 1935; Pseudacraea eurytus f. stavelioides Carpenter, 1949; Pseudacraea eurytus f. hemixantha Carpenter, 1949; Pseudacraea eurytus f. infumata Carpenter, 1949; Pseudacraea eurytus f. grisea Carpenter, 1949; Pseudacraea eurytus f. jacksoni Carpenter, 1949; Pseudacraea eurytus f. nigralba Hecq, 1991; Pseudacraea fulvaria f. fontainei Hecq, 1991; Pseudacraea striata f. knoopi Hecq, 1991; Pseudacraea simulator Grose-Smith, 1889; Pseudacraea fickei Weymer, 1907; Pseudacraea rogersi Trimen, 1909; Pseudacraea eurytus f. mlanjensis Carpenter, 1920; Pseudacraea eurytus f. victoris Eltringham, 1929; Pseudacraea eurytus f. rufobrunnea Carpenter and Jackson, 1950; Pseudacraea conradti Oberthür, 1893; Pseudacraea eurytus f. pondo Carpenter, 1949; Pseudacraea eurytus f. chionea van Son, 1979; Pseudacraea mimoras Ungemach, 1932; Pseudacraea mimoras f. lachesis Ungemach, 1932; Pseudacraea epaeoides Ungemach, 1932; Pseudacraea striata youbdonis Ungemach, 1932

= Pseudacraea eurytus =

False wanderer

Species of butterfly

Pseudacraea eurytus, the false wanderer, is a butterfly of the family Nymphalidae. It is found in Africa.

== Description ==
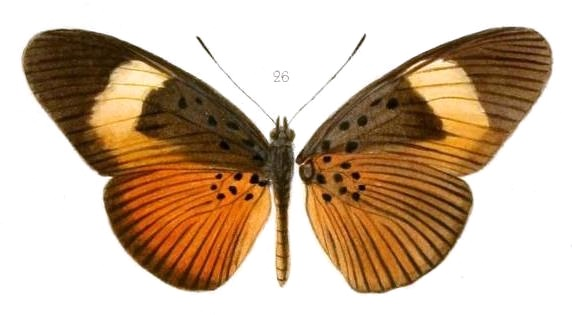
Pseudacraea eurytus eurytus, female from the Ogooué River, tropical Africa

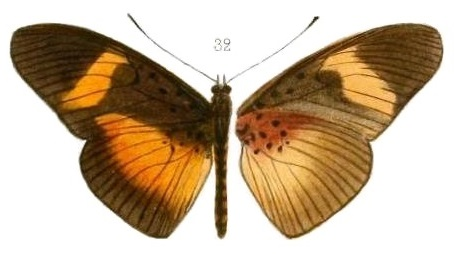
Pseudacraea eurytus conradti, male from the Usambara Mts, East Africa, in Charles Oberthür (1893)

The numerous forms of this group [eurytus group - eurytus, dolomena and rubrobasalis] may be known at once by the long, distinct black streaks on the interneural folds of the hindwing; forewing always with 5 rounded black spots in the cell and 1 or 2 at the base of cellule 1b. The butterflies stand in interesting but very complicated mimetic relations with the Planema species which fly together with them. In the males the forewing is more pointed with the distal margin straight or slightly in the females the forewing very obtusely rounded with the distal margin curved.

- Ps. eurytus L. (46 c). The hindmarginal spot of the forewing is large, reaches vein 3 and has its proximal edge sharp and straight, but does not cover the base of cellules 1b and 2; hindwing beneath at the base reddish, in the male above red-yellow, towards the distal margin gradually becoming broadly darkened, in the female white with very broad black marginal band, rather sharply defined proximally; the hindmarginal spot and the subapical band of the forewing yellow in the male, white in the female. Sierra Leone to the Cameroons.
- ab. epigea Btlr. The subapical band and the broad hindmarginal spot of the forewing are light orange-yellow as in the hindwing the same, the upperside only with a dark marginal band 3–4 mm. in breadth. Among the type-form.
- ab. bicolor Auriv. is distinguished by having the subapical band of the forewing white, but the hindwing and the hindmarginal spot on the forewing red-yellow. Congo.
- terra Neave differs in having the hindmarginal spot of the forewing very broad, almost entirely filling up the base of cellules 1-2, whilst the ochre-yellow ground-colour of the hindwing reaches the distal margin in cellules 1a-4 and only in cellules 5-7 is separated from it by a narrow black band; the hindmarginal spot and the subapical band of the forewing are lighter yellow. Uganda.
- imitator Trim, is the south-eastern race and is distinguished by having the hindmarginal spot of the forewing absent or very small and placed behind the middle of the hindmargin and the hindwing black-brown at the base, so that the white colour forms a median band. The markings are white in the female, light ochre-yellow or whitish in the male. Natal.

The wingspan is 60–68 mm for males and 65–75 mm for females.

== Subspecies ==
- Pseudacraea eurytus eurytus — southern Senegal (Casamance) to Cameroon, Angola, Zaire, southern Sudan, Uganda, west of the Rift Valley in western Kenya and western Tanzania
- Pseudacraea eurytus imitator Trimen, 1873 — South Africa, southern Mozambique
- Pseudacraea eurytus conradti Oberthür, 1893 — Kenya: east of the Rift Valley, eastern Tanzania, Malawi, northern Mozambique
- Pseudacraea eurytus obscura Neave, 1904 — Uganda
- Pseudacraea eurytus mimoras Ungemach, 1932 — south-western Ethiopia

Torben Larsen developed a species numbering system for his 2005 publication Butterflies of West Africa. The nominate subspecies is #880. The 'Larsen' numbers have since been used with permission in A Sharp Eye on Butterflies of Ghana.

== Biology ==
Adults are on wing year round, but mainly from December to May. There is a strong peak in late summer.

The larvae feed on Mimusops obovata, Englerophytum magalismontanum, E. natalense and Donella viridifolia.

== Genetic Underdominance ==
False wanderers display a rare example of stable genetic Underdominance. This species possesses two alleles which each confer an appearance similar to that of another local butterfly species that is toxic to its predator. Individuals who are heterozygous for this trait appear to be intermediate in appearance and thus experience increased predation and lowered overall fitness, since false wanderers heavily rely on Batesian mimicry for survival.
