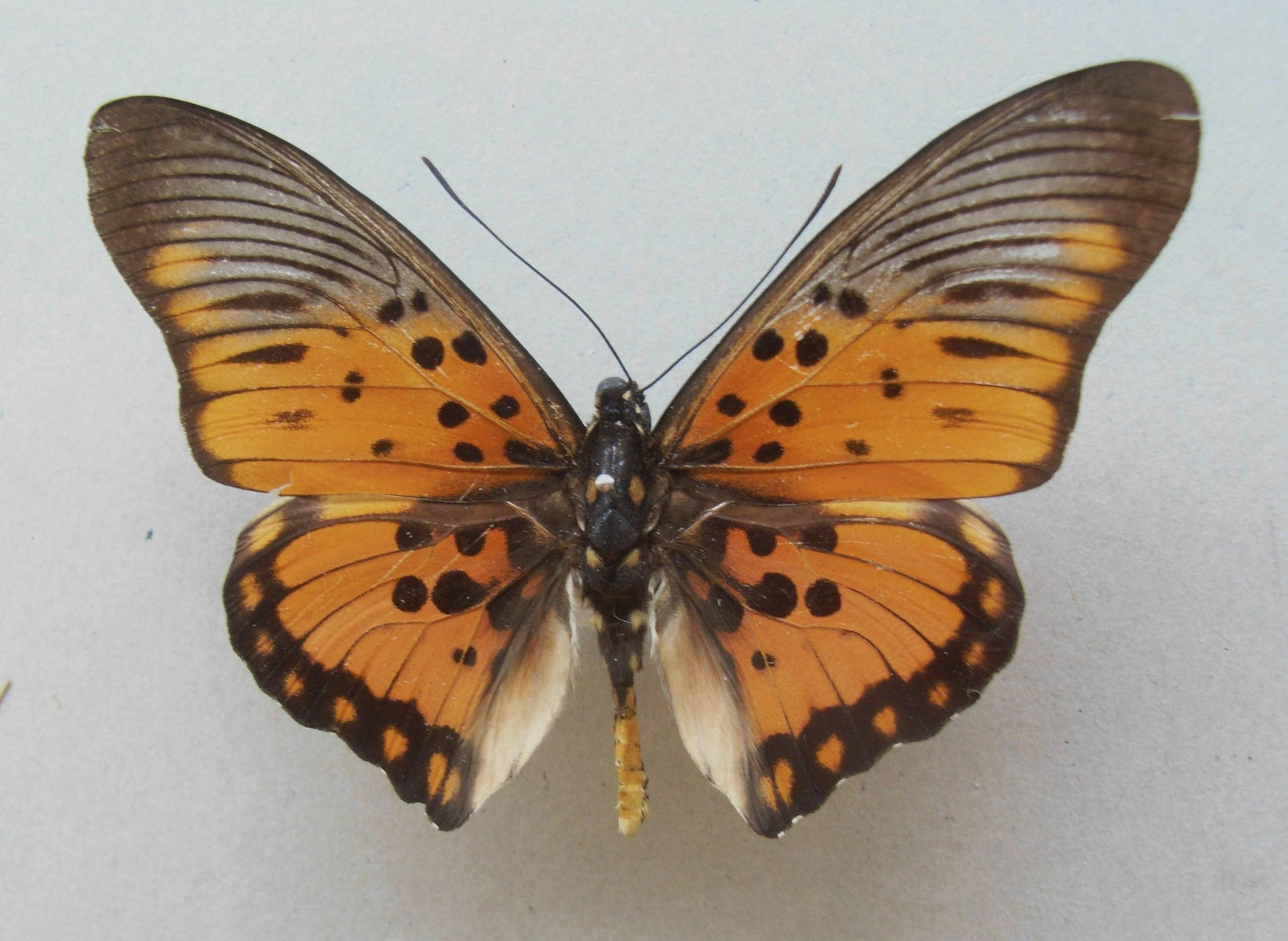

Scientific classification
- Kingdom: Animalia
- Phylum: Arthropoda
- Clade: Pancrustacea
- Class: Insecta
- Order: Lepidoptera
- Family: Nymphalidae
- Genus: Pseudacraea
- Species: P. boisduvali

Binomial name
- Pseudacraea boisduvali (Doubleday, 1845)

Synonyms
- Diadema boisduvalii Doubleday, 1845; Pseudacraea trimenii Butler, 1874; Pseudacraea boisduvali f. beatricia Stoneham, 1965; Pseudacraea boisduvali f. westwoodi Stoneham, 1965; Pseudacraea boisduvali f. marsabitensis Carpenter and Jackson, 1950; Pseudacraea colvillei Butler, 1884; Pseudacraea boisduvali var. deficiens Karsch, 1897

= Pseudacraea boisduvalii =

Boisduval's false acraea

Species of butterfly

Pseudacraea boisduvalii, or Boisduval's false acraea, frequently misspelt as Pseudacraea boisduvali is a butterfly of the family Nymphalidae. It has an extensive range which includes much of the tropics and subtropics of sub-Saharan Africa.

== Description ==
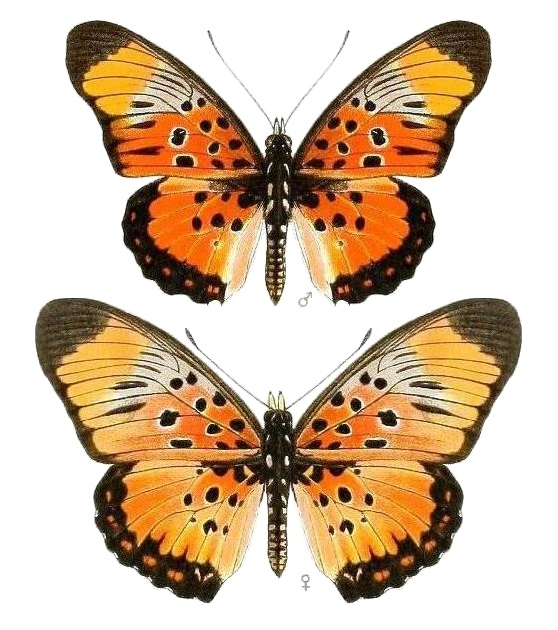
Male and female of the southernmost race, P. b. trimenii, illustrated in Seitz (1910)

The wingspan is 65–70 mm for males and 75–88 mm for females. A large and most beautiful species. As in hostilia, the hindwing is yellow-red to red-yellow with black, red-spotted marginal band, but that of boisduvali has in the basal part large rounded black spots. Fore wing in the distal part more or less semitransparent with thick black longitudinal streaks between the veins, at least in cellules 2 and 3; the black spots in the basal half are large and rounded and are present both in the cell and in cellules 1a–2; it should be specially noted that one of these spots is placed on vein 2. The species is considerably larger than Acraea egina, but mimics it almost exactly and has also local races corresponding to those of egina.

Torben Larsen developed a species numbering system for his 2005 publication Butterflies of West Africa. This species is #880. The 'Larsen' numbers have since been used with permission in A Sharp Eye on Butterflies of Ghana.

== Biology ==
Adults are on wing year round, with a peak from January to May.

The larvae feed on the foliage of various members of the Sapotaceae, namely Chrysophyllum, Mimusops (including M. obovata and M. zeyheri), Manilkara discolor and Englerophytum (including E. magalismontanum and E. natalense).

== Subspecies ==
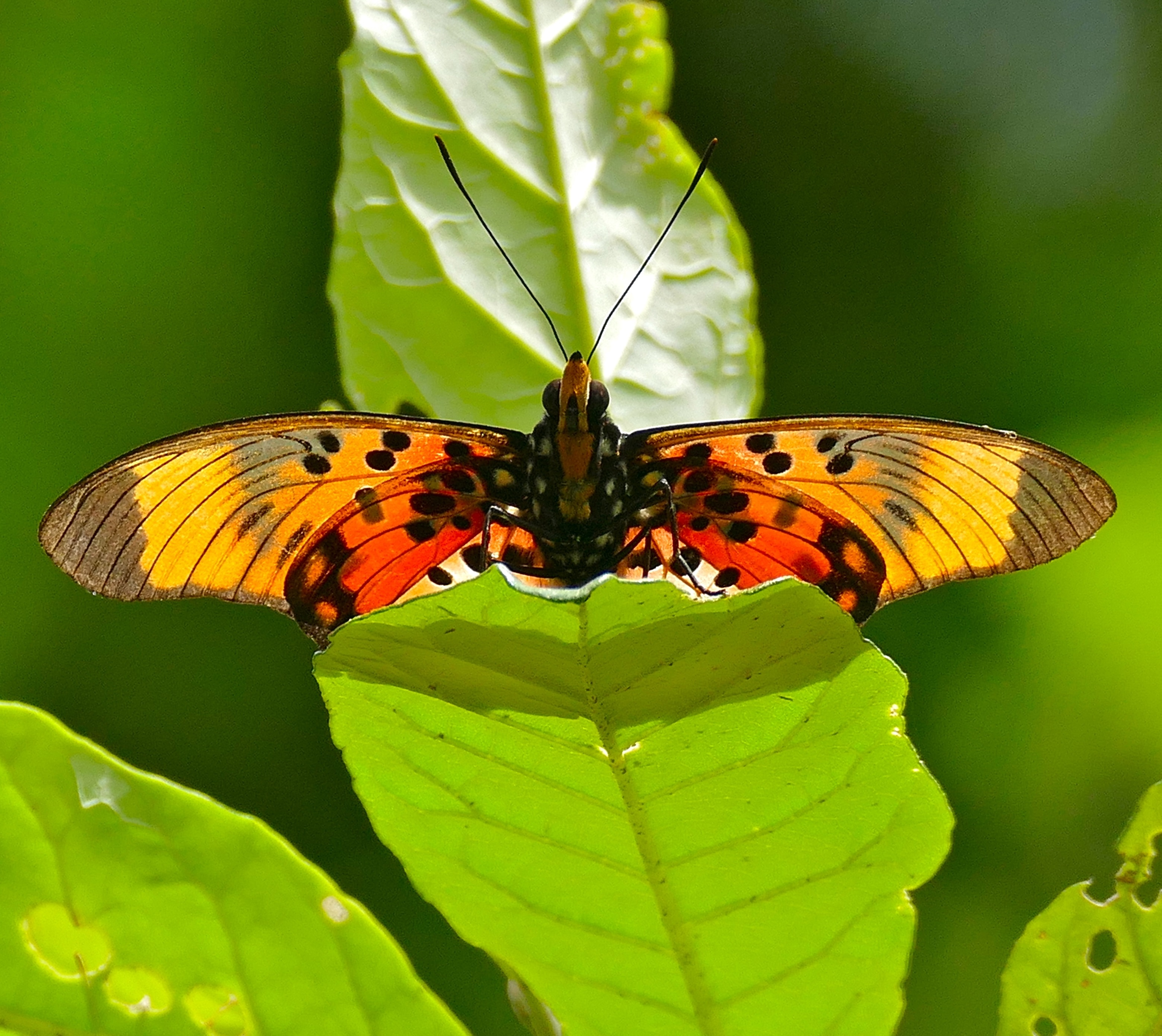
Male P. b. trimenii basking on foliage in Lekgalameetse Provincial Park, South Africa

- Pseudacraea boisduvalii boisduvalii — Sierra Leone to Zaire, Angola, Uganda, Sudan, western Kenya
- Pseudacraea boisduvalii trimenii Butler, 1874 — Port St Johns to KwaZulu-Natal, Eswatini, Mozambique, Zimbabwe, Malawi, Tanzania, eastern Kenya
- Pseudacraea boisduvalii sayonis Ungemach, 1932 — southern Ethiopia
- Pseudacraea boisduvalii marsabitensis Jackson & Howarth, 1957 — Marsabit, Mount Kulal, Mount Nyiro (all in Kenya)
- Pseudacraea boisduvali pemba Kielland, 1990 — Pemba Island

== Mimicry ==
Pseudacraea boisduvali is, with Acraea egina and Graphium ridleyanus, a member of a mimicry complex.
