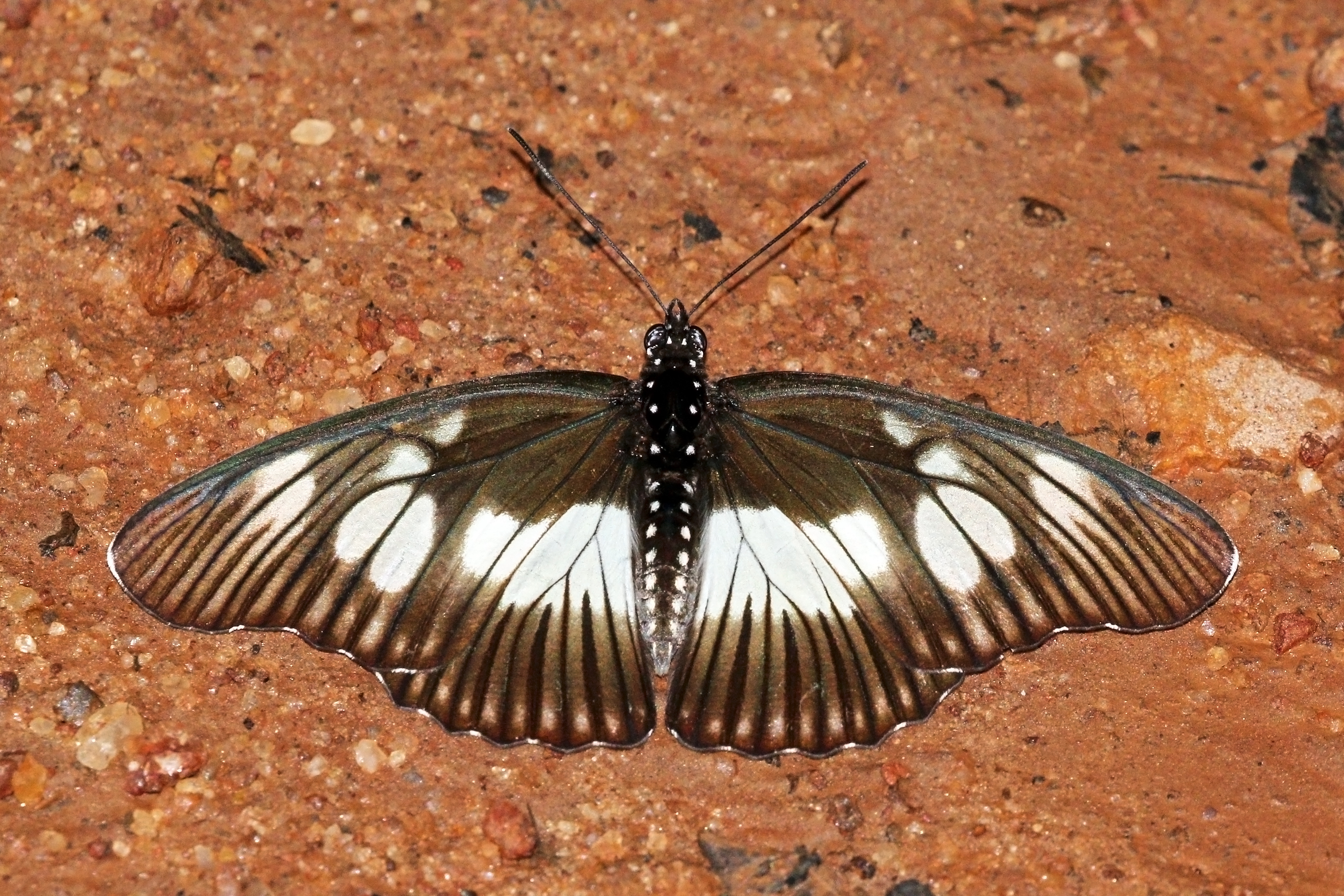
- Male P. l. lucretia Bobiri Forest, Ghana
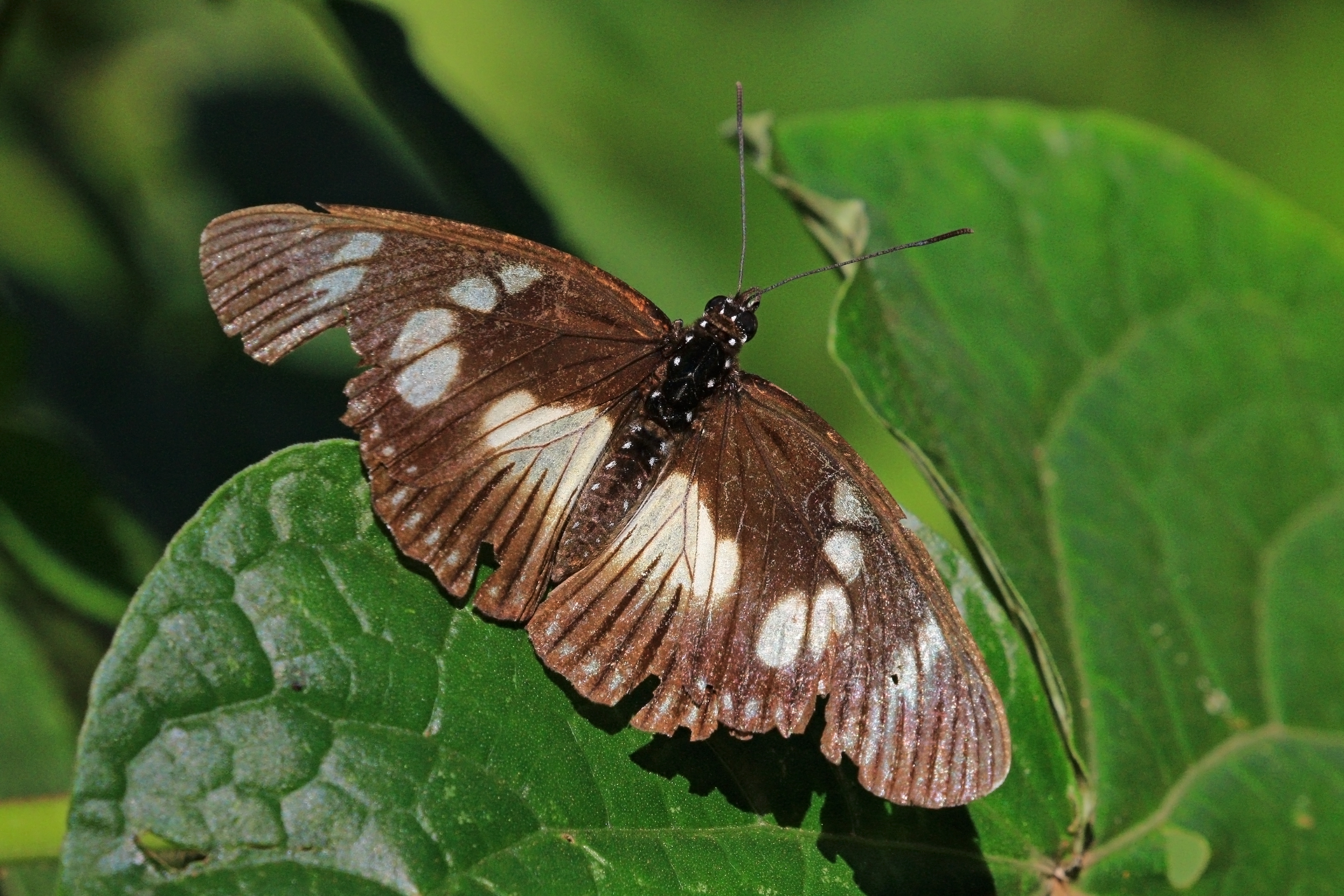
- Female P. l. protacta Kakamega Forest, Kenya

Scientific classification
- Kingdom: Animalia
- Phylum: Arthropoda
- Clade: Pancrustacea
- Class: Insecta
- Order: Lepidoptera
- Family: Nymphalidae
- Genus: Pseudacraea
- Species: P. lucretia

Binomial name
- Pseudacraea lucretia (Cramer, 1775)

Synonyms
- Papilio lucretia Cramer, 1775; Panopea tarquinia Trimen, 1868; Papilio sulpitia Fabricius, 1793; Panopaea apaturoides Felder & Felder, [1867]; Pseudacraea apaturoides; Pseudacraea drusilla Saalmüller, 1878; Pseudacraea comorana Oberthür, 1890; Pseudacraea serena Mabille, 1890; Panopea expansa Butler, 1878; Pseudacraea delagoae Trimen & Bowker, 1887; Panopea heliogenes Butler, 1896; Pseudacraea lucretia expansa f. xantha Poulton, 1926; Pseudacraea lucretia kenyae Poulton, 1926; Pseudacraea lucretia expansa f. particolor Talbot, 1943; Pseudacraea gamae Joicey & Talbot, 1927; Panopea protracta Butler, 1874; Pseudacraea lucretia ab. ramosa Schultze, 1920; Pseudacraea lucretia protracta morph pseudolucretia Bernardi, 1965; Panopea tarquinea Trimen, 1868; Panopea walensensis Sharpe, 1896; Pseudacraea lucretia var. expansa ab. eliana Strand, 1911

= Pseudacraea lucretia =

False chief

Species of butterfly

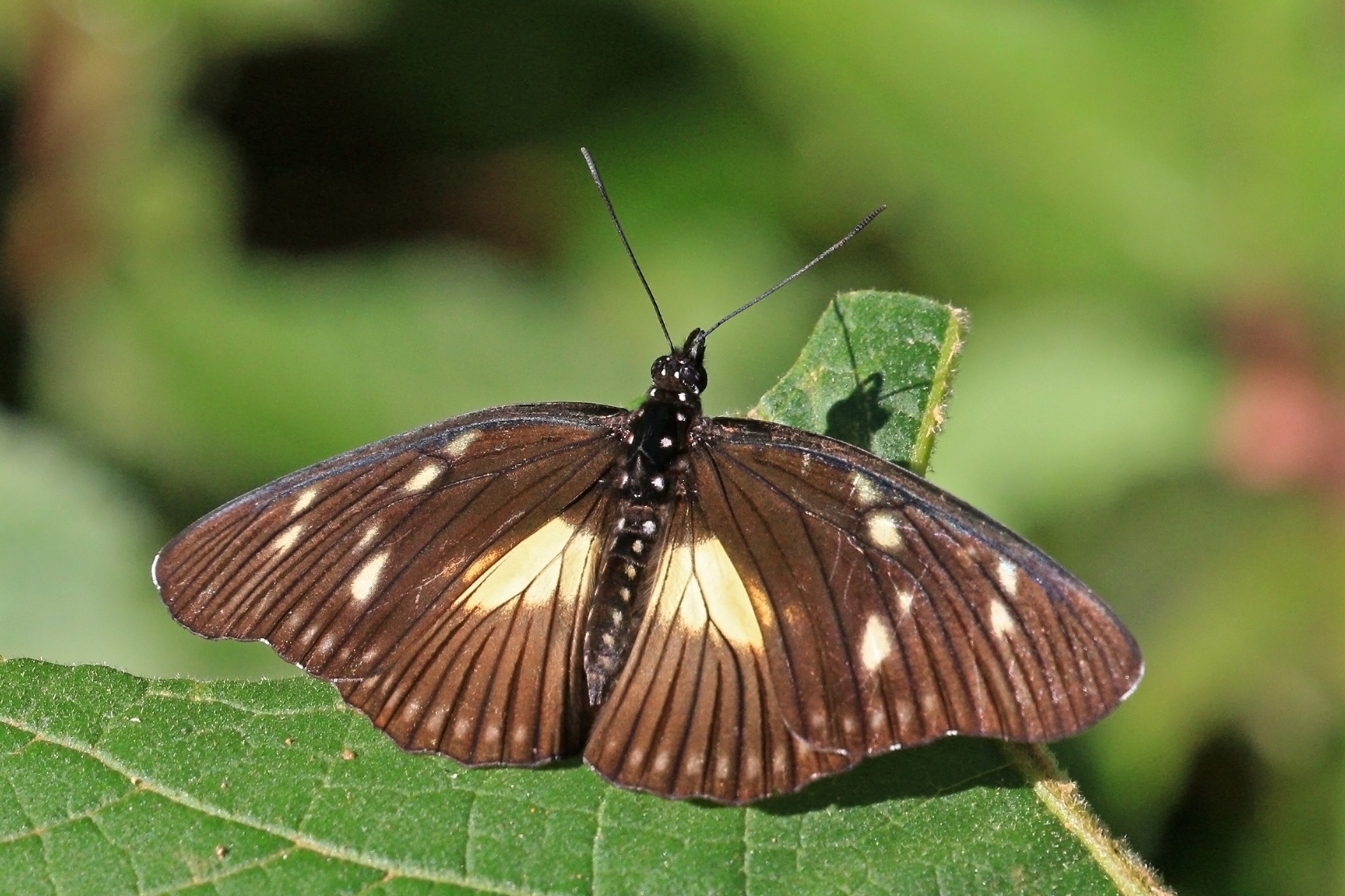
Male P. l. protacta

Pseudacraea lucretia, the false diadem or false chief, is a butterfly of the family Nymphalidae. It is found in Africa.

== Description ==
.

lucretia group. The species of this group are easy to separate from those of the preceding groups by the black, white-striped palpus and by the absence of the black spots at the base of the forewing. Beneath, however, they are very different. The sexes are coloured and marked almost alike. - Ps. lucretia is a widely distributed species and forms several local races. All the forms are black with white or yellow markings. The forewing has a hindmarginal spot, reaching at most to vein 2, a median band composed of 4 (or 5) spots, one at the apex of the cell, one each at the base of cellules 3 and 4 and one in the middle of cellule 2, and a subapical band of 2 spots in cellules 5 and 6. The hindwing has a broad median band and both wings usually before the distal margin two small punctiform spots or dashes in each cellule. The forewing is lighter beneath than above, black-grey with a thick black longitudinal streak in the cell, a triangular black spot at the base of cellule 2 and in the marginal part with black streaks on the interneural folds; the light markings as above. Hindwing beneath yellowish at the base with 6 or 7 rounded black spots, then at least to the middle white or yellowish and at the distal margin more or less broadly darkened with black veins and folds and more distinct submarginal spots than above.- lucretia Cr. (46 a). The markings on the upper surface white or white-grey; the hindmarginal spot of the fore wing is almost as long as its breadth at the hindmargin, usually reaches vein 2, but is anteriorly rounded or cut off obliquely; spots 2 and 3 in the median band are sharply defined and moderately large, but the other two much smaller and sometimes dull grey; the median band of the hindwing is of almost uniform breadth, straight-edged, 6–7 mm.in breadth and at the inner margin only reaching vein 1 b; the black basal part does not reach the beginning of vein 2. Sierra Leone to Angola and Uganda. -protracta Btlr. only differs in having the median band of the hindwing and the hindmarginal spot of the forewing (at least at the hindmargin) yellowish. Congo. -expansa Btlr. (46 a) is distinguished by the increased size of the light markings and by having the distal margin of the hindwing spotted with brown-yellow at the anal angle. The white spots in the median band of the forewing are especially strongly enlarged; the hindmarginal spot is indeed much broader at the hindmargin than in lucretia but is much shorter, reaching at most to the middle of cellule 1 b; the median band of the hindwing is white. 10–14 mm. in breadth, distally rounded and reaching the inner margin. East Africa from Delagoa Bay to British East Africa. – ab. heliogenes Btlr. only differs from expansa in having the light markings light yellow to brown-yellow instead of white; on the other hand the yellow colour of the distal margin at the anal angle of the hindwing is often absent. Nyassaland and German East Africa. - walensensis E. Sharpe is the most northerly race, occurring in Somaliland and Abyssinia, and apparently cannot always be sharply differentiated from the type-form. The hindmarginal spot of the forewing is often united with the median band and the submarginal spots on the upperside of the hindwing stand out sharply. Whether the black colour at the base of the hindwing reaches vein 2 or not is not mentioned. - tarquinia Trim. (46 a) is distinguished by the nearly black ground-colour and the much reduced, sometimes indistinct, light spots of the fore wing and is also on an average somewhat smaller than the other forms. The median band of the hindwing is light yellowish, moderately broad, distally somewhat rounded, and does not reach the inner margin; the hindmarginal spot of the forewing is very small, yellowish, occasionally entirely absent; the spots of the median band very small and often separated; the subapical dots of both wings absent or indistinct. Larva above bright green, beneath whitish; lateral line, head and the first, strongly elongated spines flesh-red; the last spines light yellow; lives on Mimusops obovata and Chrysophyllum. Pupa green with yellow lateral line and the head produced to a very long point; recalls the pupa of Leucophasia sinapis, but is curved in the opposite direction. Natal to German East Africa. - comorana Oberth. nearly agrees with the following form and like this differs from all the continental forms in having the black colour at the base of the hindwing above broader, reaching the beginning of vein 2. It is distinguished from apaturoides by the hindmarginal spot of the forewing, which is smaller, anteriorly rounded, and only reaches the fold of cellule 1 b. Comoros. - apaturoides Fldr. (46 a) has the hindmarginal spot of the forewing sharply defined, almost quadrate and anteriorly cut off straight by vein 2, and the black basal part of the upperside of the hindwing extended as far as vein 2; the white markings of the upper surface are slightly tinged with greenish and the white colour on the underside of the hindwing reaches the base or is there only slightly spotted with yellowish. Madagascar. The wingspan is 60–72 mm for males and 65–68 mm for females.

== Subspecies ==
- Pseudacraea lucretia lucretia (Senegal to Nigeria)
- Pseudacraea lucretia apaturoides (C. & R. Felder, [1867]) (Madagascar)
- Pseudacraea lucretia comorana Oberthür, 1890 (Comoro Islands: Anjouan)
- Pseudacraea lucretia expansa Butler, 1878 (South Africa (Limpopo Province and Mpumalanga) Zimbabwe, Malawi, Zambia, Mozambique, east of the Rift Valley in Tanzania and Kenya)
- Pseudacraea lucretia gamae Joicey & Talbot, 1927 (São Tomé and Príncipe: Principe)
- Pseudacraea lucretia karthalae Collins, 1991 (Comoro Islands: Grand Comore Island)
- Pseudacraea lucretia protracta (Butler, 1874) (Cameroon to Angola, Zaire, Uganda, southern Sudan, western Tanzania, western Kenya)
- Pseudacraea lucretia tarquinia (Trimen, 1868) (Eastern Cape to northern KwaZulu-Natal)
- Pseudacraea lucretia walensensis (Sharpe, 1896) (southern Ethiopia)

Torben Larsen developed a species numbering system for his 2005 publication Butterflies of West Africa. The nominate subspecies is #887. The 'Larsen' numbers have since been used with permission in A Sharp Eye on Butterflies of Ghana.

== Biology ==
Adults are on wing year round, with a peak from January to July.

The larvae feed on Mimusops obovata, Mimusops zeyheri, Mimusops afra, Englerophytum magalismontanum, E. natalense and Donella viridifolia.
