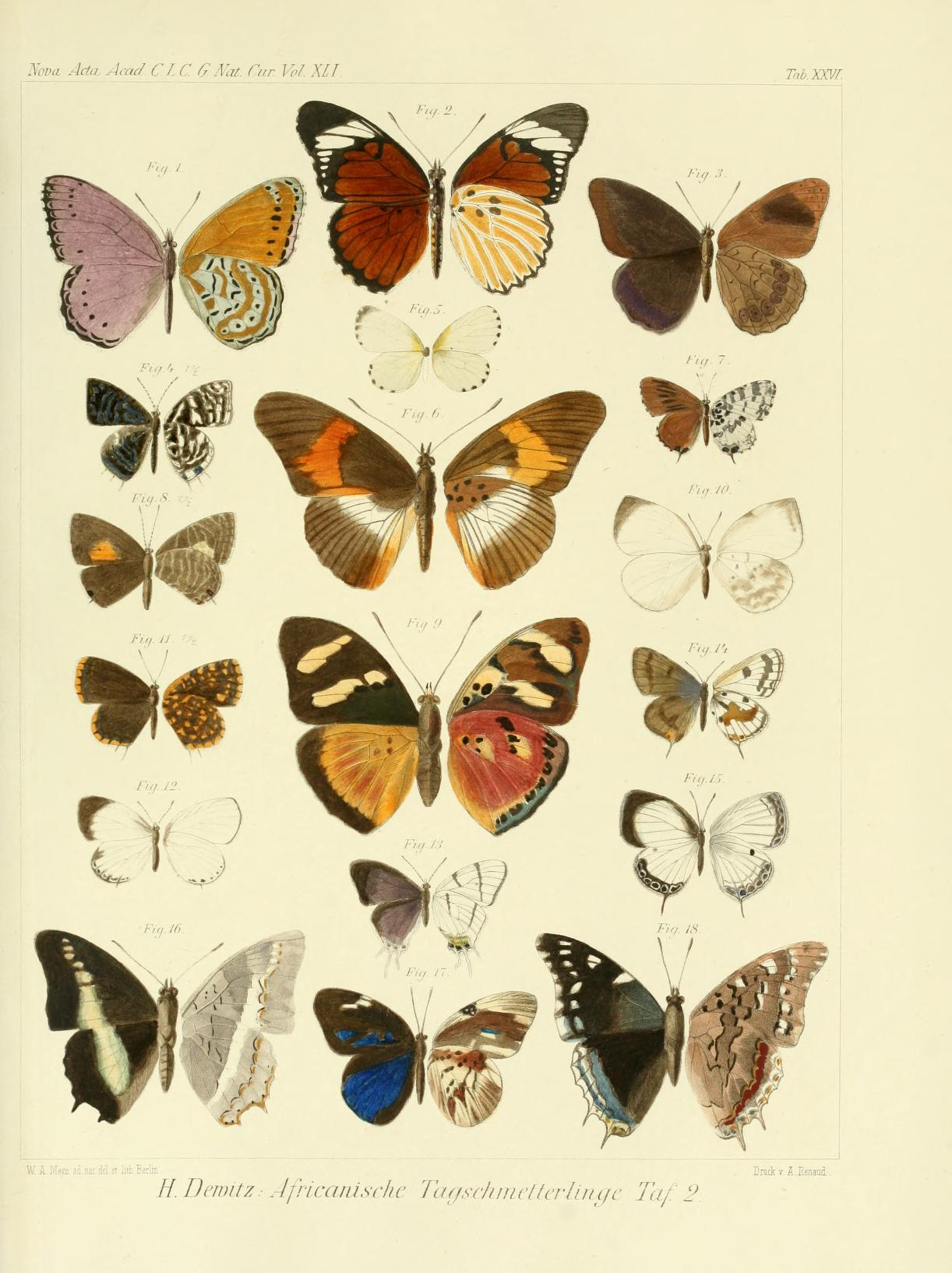
- Figure 2 (accompanying original description)

Scientific classification
- Kingdom: Animalia
- Phylum: Arthropoda
- Clade: Pancrustacea
- Class: Insecta
- Order: Lepidoptera
- Family: Nymphalidae
- Genus: Pseudacraea
- Species: P. poggei

Binomial name
- Pseudacraea poggei (Dewitz, 1879)

Synonyms
- Hypolimnas poggei Dewitz, 1879; Pseudacraea poggei f. carpenteri Poulton, 1918

= Pseudacraea poggei =

Species of butterfly

Pseudacraea poggei, the false monarch or monarch false acraea, is a butterfly in the family Nymphalidae. It is found in Angola, Namibia (Caprivi), northern Zambia, Malawi, the Democratic Republic of the Congo (Shaba) and western Tanzania.

== Description ==
.

Ps. poggei Dew. is a wonderfully faithful mimic of Danaida chrysippus. Both wings red-yellow above with fine black veins, but without black streaks between the veins; the apex of the forewing is black as far as the base of vein 4, with a -white subapical band composed of three large spots in cellules 4-6; the black colour forms at the costal margin a narrow streak to the base and at the distal margin as far as the hinder angle a white-dotted band about 3 mm. in breadth. The hindwing shows an unspotted black band about 2 mm. broad and close at the base is somewhat suffused with grey with indications of the black spots of the underside. The under surface of the forewing is similar to the upper, but relieved with grey at the apex; the hindwing, however, has beneath 4 large black spots at the base, the veins white, at the distal margin black, and instead of the marginal band only a black marginal line. Angola, southern Congo and Rhodesia.

== Biology ==
The habitat consists of woodland.

Adults mimic Danaus chrysippus and have a similar flight pattern, but it is slightly faster.

The larvae feed on Chrysophyllum bangweolense.

== Etymology ==
The specific epithet honours the explorer Paul Pogge
