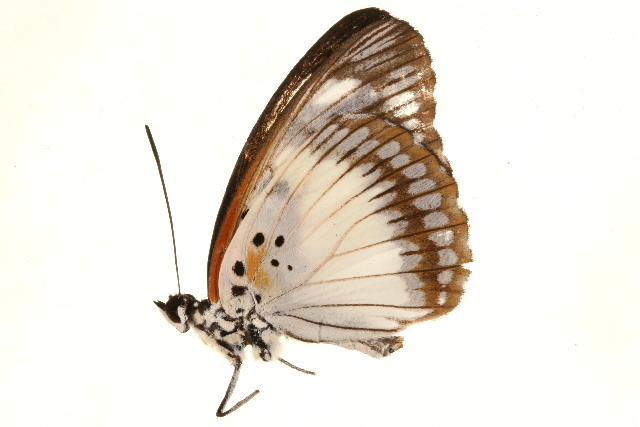

Scientific classification
- Domain: Eukaryota
- Kingdom: Animalia
- Phylum: Arthropoda
- Class: Insecta
- Order: Lepidoptera
- Family: Nymphalidae
- Genus: Pseudacraea
- Species: P. peyrierasi

Binomial name
- Pseudacraea peyrierasi Collins, 1991

= Pseudacraea peyrierasi =

Species of butterfly

Pseudacraea peyrierasi is a butterfly in the family Nymphalidae. It is found on Madagascar. The habitat consists of forests.
