= Pseudacraea acholica =

Scientific classification
- Domain: Eukaryota
- Kingdom: Animalia
- Phylum: Arthropoda
- Class: Insecta
- Order: Lepidoptera
- Family: Nymphalidae
- Genus: Pseudacraea
- Species: P. acholica

Binomial name
- Pseudacraea acholica Riley, 1932

Species of butterfly

Pseudacraea acholica is a butterfly in the family Nymphalidae. It is found in Sudan and the Democratic Republic of the Congo.

== Subspecies ==
- Pseudacraea acholica acholica (Sudan)
- Pseudacraea acholica mayenceae Hecq, 1987 (Democratic Republic of the Congo)
