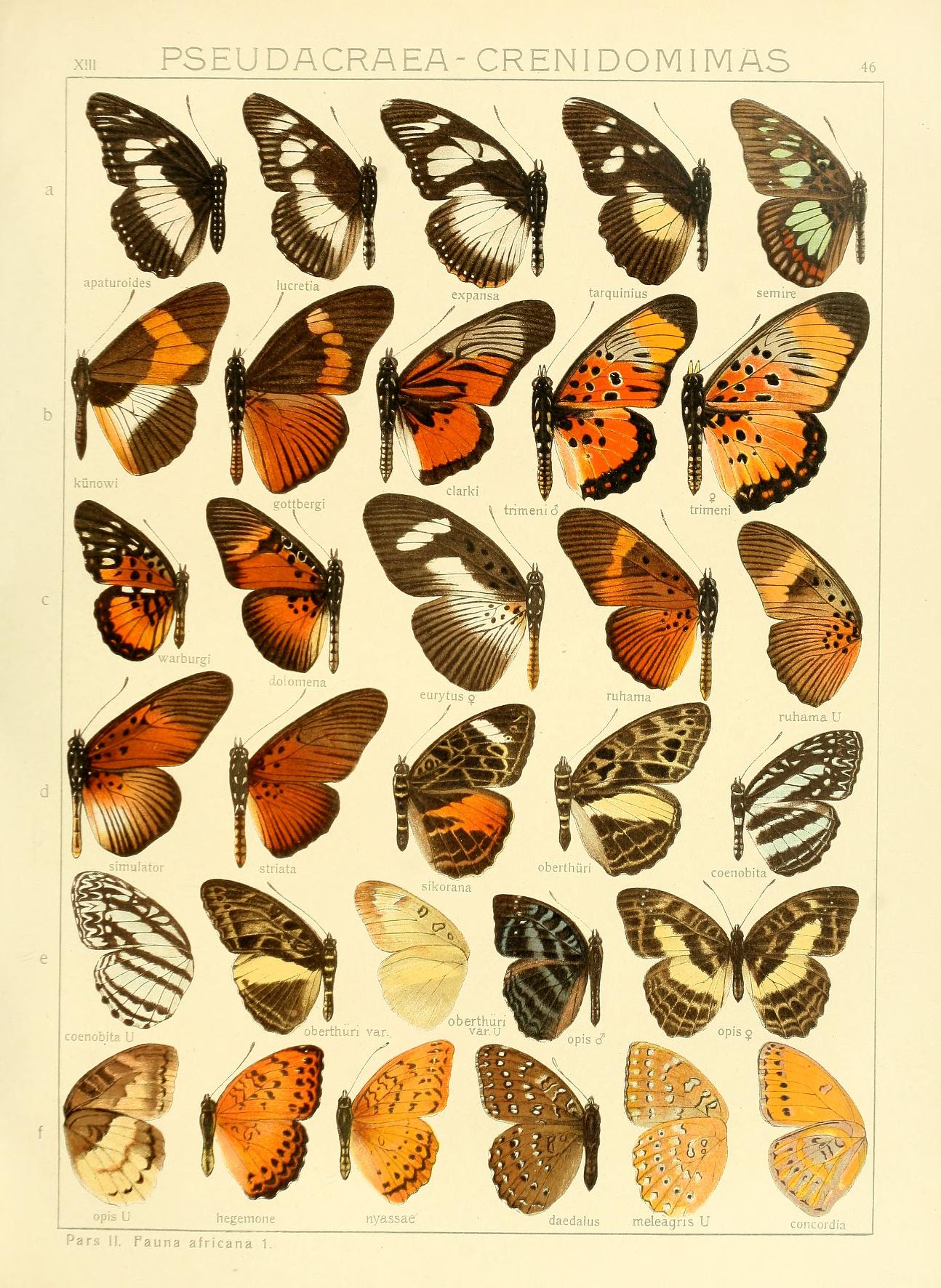
- In Adalbert Seitz's Fauna Africana

Scientific classification
- Kingdom: Animalia
- Phylum: Arthropoda
- Clade: Pancrustacea
- Class: Insecta
- Order: Lepidoptera
- Family: Nymphalidae
- Genus: Pseudacraea
- Species: P. warburgi

Binomial name
- Pseudacraea warburgi Aurivillius, 1892

= Pseudacraea warburgi =

Species of butterfly

Pseudacraea warburgi, the incipient false acraea, is a butterfly in the family Nymphalidae. It is found in Senegal, Guinea, Sierra Leone, Liberia, Ivory Coast, Ghana, Nigeria, Cameroon, the Republic of the Congo, the Democratic Republic of the Congo and Uganda (from the western part of the country to the Bwamba Valley).

Torben Larsen developed a species numbering system for his 2005 publication Butterflies of West Africa. This species is #888. The 'Larsen' numbers have since been used with permission in A Sharp Eye on Butterflies of Ghana.

== Description ==
Very similar to Pseudacraea hostilia q.v. for differences.

== Biology ==
The habitat consists of forest.

It is a mimic of an Acraea species.

The larvae feed on Strephanema, Manilkara and Combretum species.
