= Pseudacraea annakae =

Scientific classification
- Domain: Eukaryota
- Kingdom: Animalia
- Phylum: Arthropoda
- Class: Insecta
- Order: Lepidoptera
- Family: Nymphalidae
- Genus: Pseudacraea
- Species: P. annakae

Binomial name
- Pseudacraea annakae Knoop, 1988

Species of butterfly

Pseudacraea annakae, the montane false acraea, is a butterfly in the family Nymphalidae. It is found in Nigeria and Cameroon. The habitat consists of sub-montane forests.
