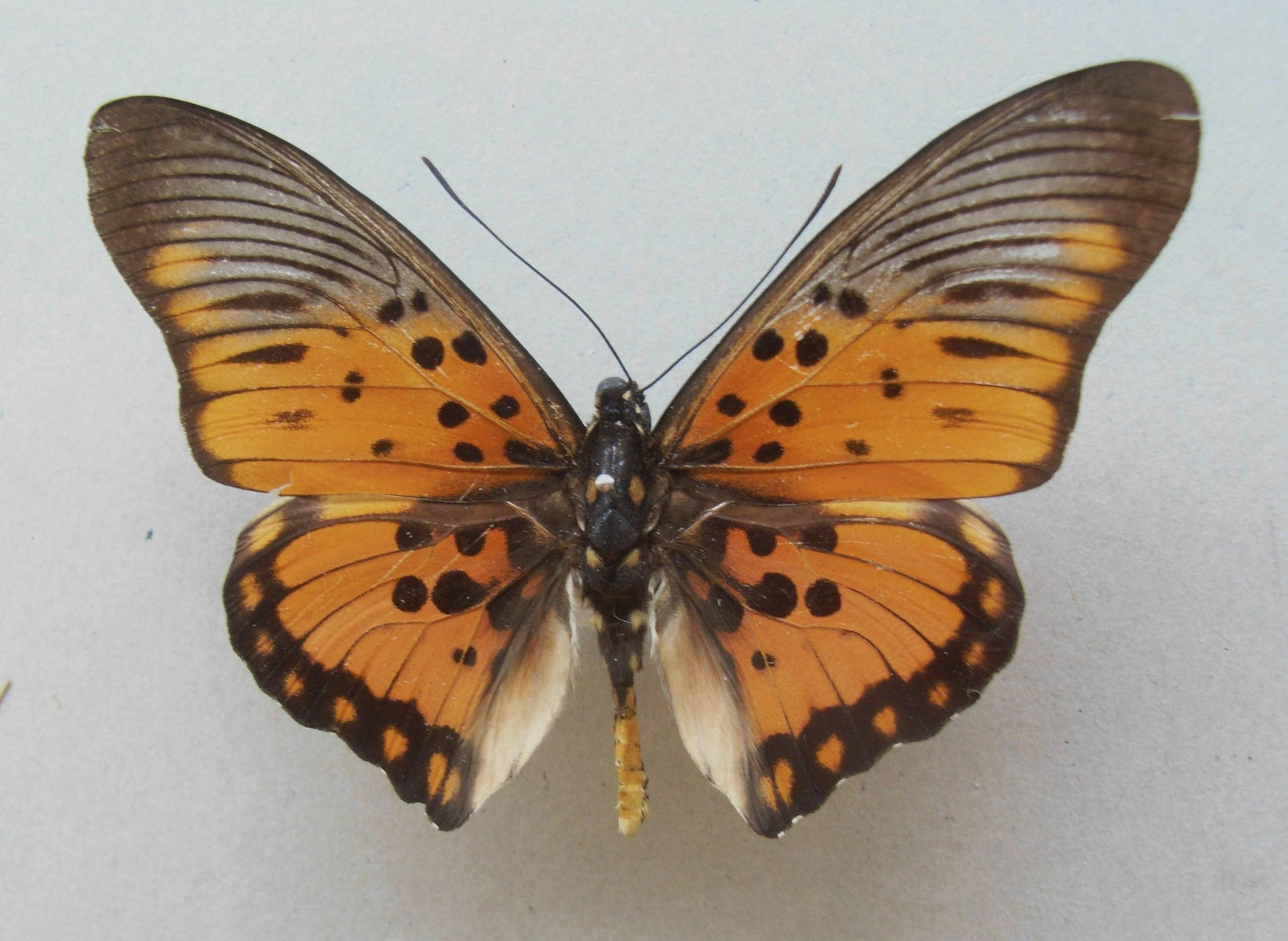
- Pseudacraea boisduvali

Scientific classification
- Kingdom: Animalia
- Phylum: Arthropoda
- Clade: Pancrustacea
- Class: Insecta
- Order: Lepidoptera
- Family: Nymphalidae
- Tribe: Limenitidini
- Genus: Pseudacraea; Westwood, 1850

Synonyms
- Panopea Hübner, [1819]; Chloropoea Aurivillius, 1898

= Pseudacraea =

Genus of brush-footed butterflies

Pseudacraea is an Afrotropical butterfly genus in the subfamily Limenitidinae. Their placement in the tribe Limenitidini remains to be verified.

Some of these species are mimics of Acraeinae and the present genus is thus known as false acraeas.

== Species ==
Listed alphabetically:

- Pseudacraea acholica Riley, 1932
- Pseudacraea annakae Knoop, 1988
- Pseudacraea boisduvali (Doubleday, 1845)
- Pseudacraea clarki Butler, 1892
- Pseudacraea deludens Neave, 1912
- Pseudacraea dolomena (Hewitson, 1865)
- Pseudacraea eurytus (Linnaeus, 1758)
- Pseudacraea fulvaria Butler, 1876
- Pseudacraea hostilia (Drury, 1782)
- Pseudacraea imerina (Hewitson, [1865])
- Pseudacraea kuenowi Dewitz, 1879
- Pseudacraea lucretia (Cramer, 1775)
- Pseudacraea peyrierasi Collins, 1991
- Pseudacraea poggei (Dewitz, 1879)
- Pseudacraea rubrobasalis Aurivillius, 1903
- Pseudacraea ruhama Hewitson, 1873
- Pseudacraea ruwenzorica Grünberg, 1912
- Pseudacraea semire (Cramer, [1779])
- Pseudacraea simulator Grose-Smith, 1873
- Pseudacraea striata Butler, 1876
- Pseudacraea theorini Aurivillius, 1891
- Pseudacraea victoris Eltringham, 1929
- Pseudacraea warburgi Aurivillius, 1892
