= Euptera pluto =

Scientific classification
- Domain: Eukaryota
- Kingdom: Animalia
- Phylum: Arthropoda
- Class: Insecta
- Order: Lepidoptera
- Family: Nymphalidae
- Genus: Euptera
- Species: E. pluto

Binomial name
- Euptera pluto (Ward, 1873)

Synonyms
- Euryphene pluto Ward, 1873; Thaleropis trigona Holland, 1892; Euptera elabontas f. primitiva van Someren, 1939

Species of butterfly

Euptera pluto, the Pluto euptera, is a butterfly in the family Nymphalidae. It is found in Liberia, Togo, Nigeria, Cameroon, Gabon, the Republic of the Congo, the Central African Republic, the Democratic Republic of the Congo, Uganda and Zambia.

The larvae feed on Englerophytum species.

== Subspecies ==
- Euptera pluto pluto (southern Nigeria, Cameroon, Gabon, Congo, Central African Republic, northern Democratic Republic of the Congo)
- Euptera pluto occidentalis Chovet, 1998 (Liberia, Togo)
- Euptera pluto primitiva Hancock, 1984 (Uganda: Katera, Democratic Republic of the Congo: south-east to Lualaba, north-western Zambia)
