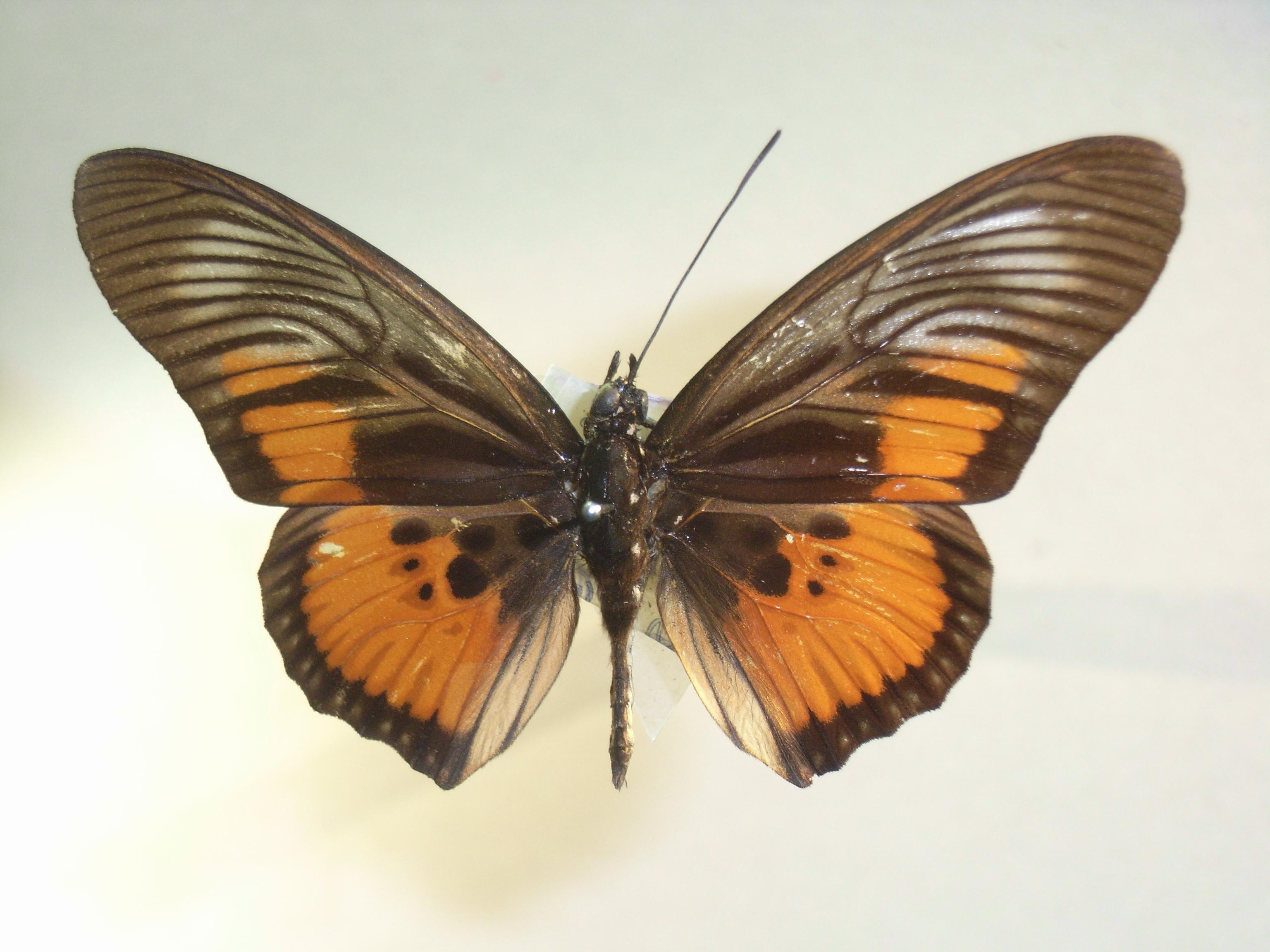

Scientific classification
- Domain: Eukaryota
- Kingdom: Animalia
- Phylum: Arthropoda
- Class: Insecta
- Order: Lepidoptera
- Family: Nymphalidae
- Genus: Pseudacraea
- Species: P. clarkii

Binomial name
- Pseudacraea clarkii Butler & Rothschild, 1892

Synonyms
- Pseudacraea clarki var. egina Aurivillius, 1903; Pseudacraea eginoides Schultze, 1906

= Pseudacraea clarkii =

Species of butterfly

Pseudacraea clarkii, or Clark's false acraea, is a butterfly in the family Nymphalidae. It is found in Nigeria, Cameroon, Gabon, the Republic of the Congo, the Democratic Republic of the Congo and western Uganda.

== Description ==
.

Ps. clarki Btlr. (46 b). Upperside of the forewing bright yellow-red in the cell nearly to its apex and in cellules l-3 as far as the black marginal band, which is 3 mm. in breadth, a thick black longitudinal stripe in the cell and in each of the cellules named; the apical half is blackish, at the apex itself broadly black, usually with a broad reddish subapical band in cellules 4-6 and black longitudinal streaks on the folds; hindwing bright yellow-red above with large, more or less confluent black spots at the base and a sharply defined black marginal band 2-3 mm. in breadth, which sometimes encloses indistinct light spots; black longitudinal streaks are absent or are very short; the inner margin is whitish in cellules 1 a and 1 b; the under surface is much lighter, the hindwing light grey or whitish with distinct streaks on the interneural folds and free basal spots. Recalls Acraea orinata (57 a). Cameroons to the Congo. -ab. egina Auriv. (= eginoides A. Schultze) only differs in having the forewing black in the basal part also, only behind the middle with a red half-band, extending from the hindmargin to the middle of cellule 3. Recalls Acraea egina (54 d). Cameroons and Congo.

== Biology ==
The habitat consists of forests.
