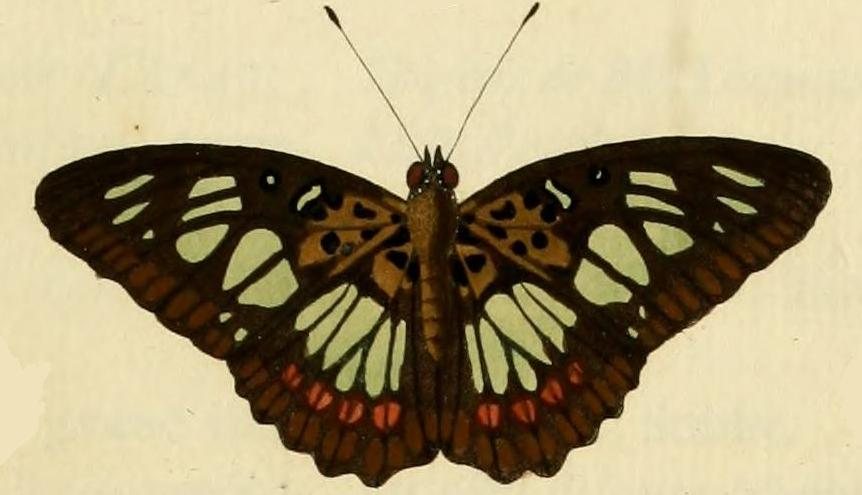

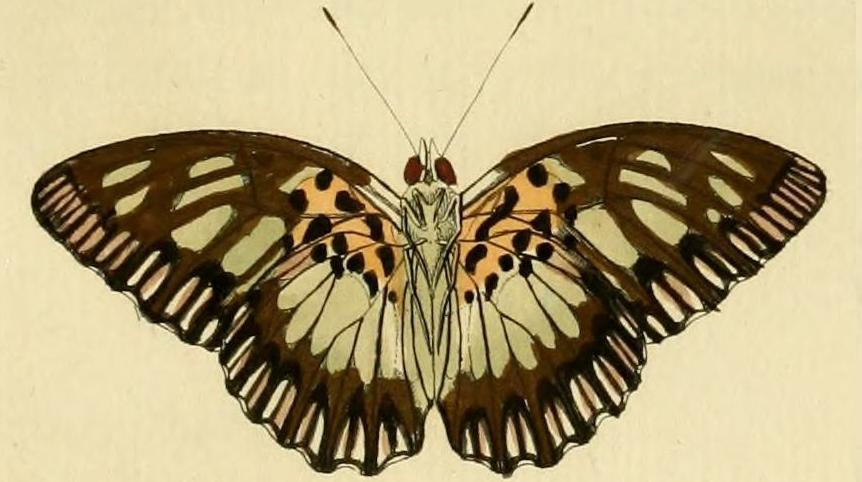

Scientific classification
- Kingdom: Animalia
- Phylum: Arthropoda
- Clade: Pancrustacea
- Class: Insecta
- Order: Lepidoptera
- Family: Nymphalidae
- Genus: Pseudacraea
- Species: P. semire

Binomial name
- Pseudacraea semire (Cramer, 1779)

Synonyms
- Papilio semire Cramer, 1779; Papilio hyppolite Drury, 1782

= Pseudacraea semire =

Species of butterfly

Pseudacraea semire, the green false acraea, is a butterfly in the family Nymphalidae. It is found in Guinea, Sierra Leone, Liberia, Ivory Coast, Ghana, Togo, Nigeria, Cameroon, Gabon, the Republic of the Congo, the Central African Republic, Angola, the Democratic Republic of the Congo, western Uganda, north-western Tanzania and north-western Zambia.

== Description ==
.

semire group. Only a single species, which differs from all others in the very small cell of the hindwing. Ps. semire Cr. (46 a). Both wings black-brown above, in the basal part with large black dots and in the middle with green spots, which on the hindwing form a continuous median band, but on the fore wing are smaller and widely separated, in the cell of the forewing also two small green spots; the interneural folds before the distal margin with broad, black, light-bordered streaks and on the hindwing between these and the green median band with a row of brown-red spots. The under surface is lighter than the upper, especially at the base, and the green spots whitish. Sierra Leone to Angola.

Torben Larsen developed a species numbering system for his 2005 publication Butterflies of West Africa. This species is #900. The 'Larsen' numbers have since been used with permission in A Sharp Eye on Butterflies of Ghana.

== Biology ==
The habitat consists of lowland to sub-montane forest.

The larvae feed on Ouratea species, as well as Campylospermum laeve and Ochna pulchra.
