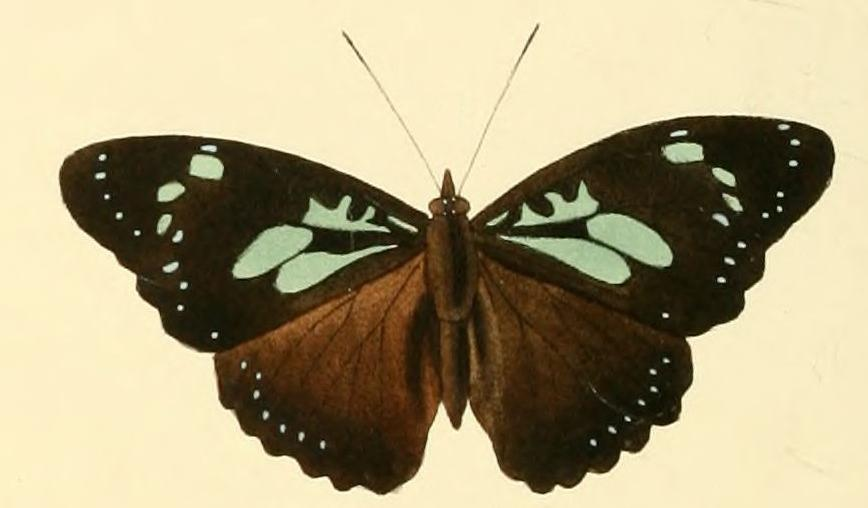

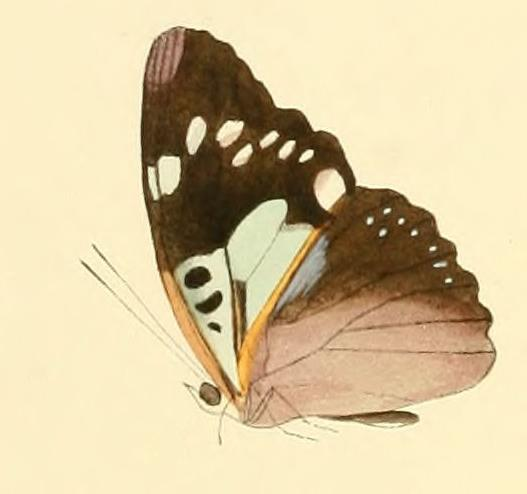

Scientific classification
- Domain: Eukaryota
- Kingdom: Animalia
- Phylum: Arthropoda
- Class: Insecta
- Order: Lepidoptera
- Family: Nymphalidae
- Genus: Pseudacraea
- Species: P. imerina

Binomial name
- Pseudacraea imerina (Hewitson, 1865)

Synonyms
- Diadema imerina Hewitson, 1865; Panopea glaucina Guenée, 1865; Pseudacraea glaucina anjouana Collins, 1991

= Pseudacraea imerina =

Species of butterfly

Pseudacraea imerina is a butterfly in the family Nymphalidae. It is found on Madagascar and the Comoros.

== Description ==
.

glaucina group -the only species of this group differs very considerably from all others and is quite isolated. P. glaucina Guen. Forewing black with two large green spots at the base of cellules 1 b and 2; cell short, green with three black spots at the anterior margin; midway between the cell and the apex of the wing 5 small, free green spots in cellules 3-6 and 9, arranged in a curve; small greenish submarginal dots. Hindwing unicolorous black above, with a triangular chalk-white spot at the costal margin in cellule 7 and very small whitish submarginal dots; beneath dark grey, at the distal margin blackish and at the hindmargin yellowish white to beyond the middle. Madagascar; rare.

== Subspecies ==
- Pseudacraea imerina imerina (southern and eastern Madagascar)
- Pseudacraea imerina anjouana Collins, 1991 (Comoro Islands: Anjouan)

== Biology ==
The habitat consists of forests.

== Gallery ==
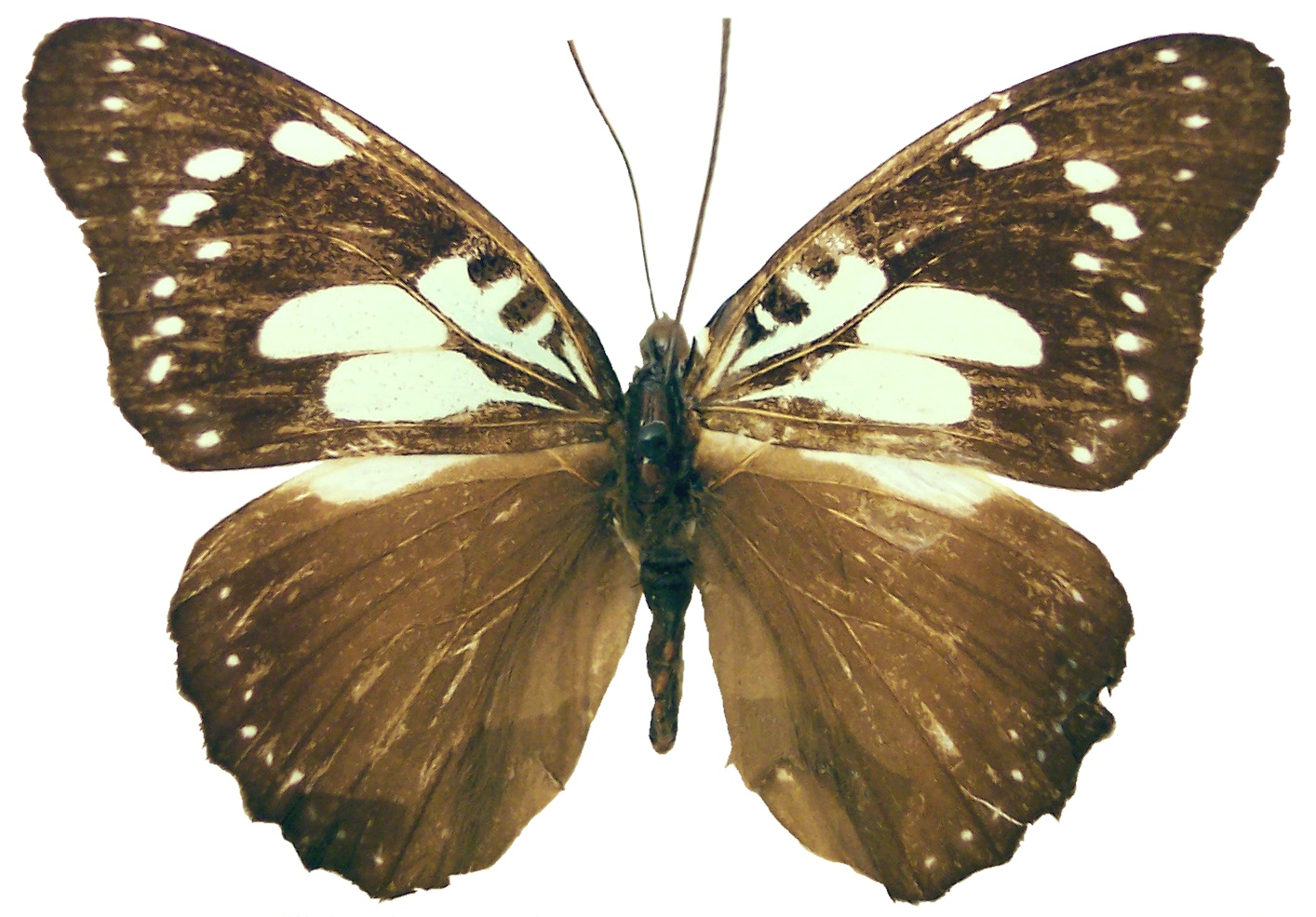
P. imerina imerina
