= Englerophytum paludosum =

Scientific classification
- Kingdom: Plantae
- Clade: Tracheophytes
- Clade: Angiosperms
- Clade: Eudicots
- Clade: Asterids
- Order: Ericales
- Family: Sapotaceae
- Genus: Englerophytum
- Species: E. paludosum

Binomial name
- Englerophytum paludosum L.Gaut., Burgt, & O.Lachenaud

Species of tree

Englerophytum paludosum is an evergreen tree species in the family Sapotaceae. The species was first described in 2016, wherein its 50-cm trunk bears an edible fruit. Having a native range from southern Nigeria, to the Democratic Republic of Congo, this species was named after the swamp-forest habitat it was discovered.
