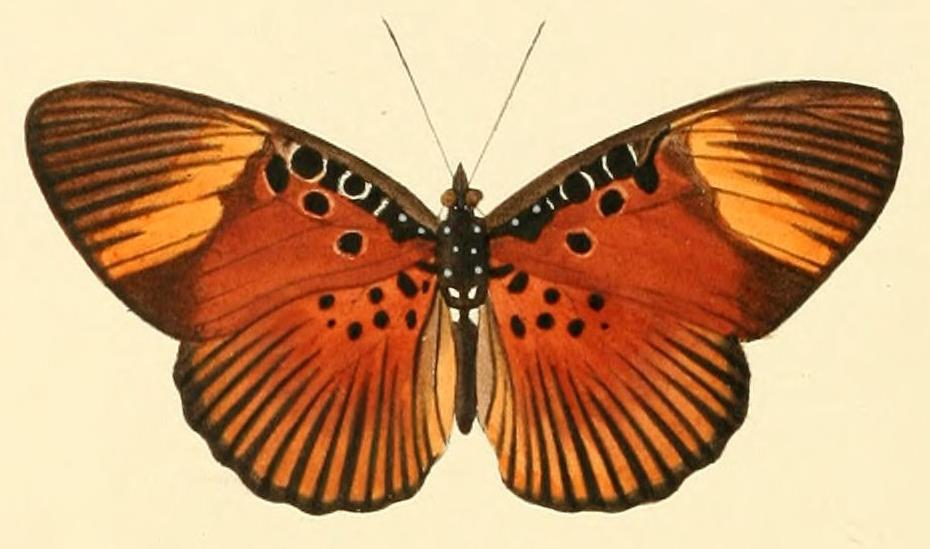

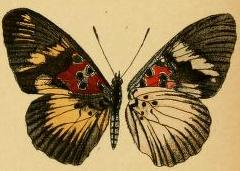

Scientific classification
- Domain: Eukaryota
- Kingdom: Animalia
- Phylum: Arthropoda
- Class: Insecta
- Order: Lepidoptera
- Family: Nymphalidae
- Genus: Pseudacraea
- Species: P. dolomena

Binomial name
- Pseudacraea dolomena (Hewitson, 1865)

Synonyms
- Diadema dolomena Hewitson, 1865; Diadema macularia Capronnier, 1889; Pseudacraea albolineata Richelmann, 1913; Pseudacraea dolomena ab. albovittata Schultze, 1920; Pseudacraea dolomena dolomena f. pseudepiprotea Jackson, 1951; Pseudacraea albostriata Lathy, 1906; Pseudacraea dolomena var. dolabella Hall, 1919; Pseudacraea dolomena kayonza f. flava Jackson, 1956; Pseudacraea dolomena pharsa Fruhstorfer, 1903; Pseudacraea dolichiste Hall, 1919; Pseudacraea dolomena usagarae f. unguru Jackson, 1951

= Pseudacraea dolomena =

Species of butterfly

Pseudacraea dolomena, the variable false acraea, is a butterfly in the family Nymphalidae. It is found in Nigeria, Cameroon, Gabon, the Republic of the Congo, the Central African Republic, Angola, the Democratic Republic of the Congo, Uganda, Kenya, Tanzania and Zambia.

== Description ==
.

The numerous forms of this group [ Pseudacraea eurytus group - eurytus, dolomena and rubrobasalis] may be known at once by the long, distinct black streaks on the interneural folds of the hindwing; forewing always with 5 rounded black spots in the cell and 1 or 2 at the base of cellule 1 b. The butterflies stand in interesting but very complicated mimetic relations with the Planema species which fly together with them. In the males the forewing is more pointed with the distal margin straight or slightly in the females the forewing very obtusely rounded with the distal margin curved. Ps. dolomena is distinguished from all the others by the large basal dots of the forewing, which are surrounded by white or whitish rings. -dolomena Hew. (46 c). Forewing in the male above with very large red hindmarginal spot, covering cellules l-2 and the posterior longitudinal half of the cellUand with a yellow subapical band, which at least in cellule 3 forms a large spot and usually has also a streak in cellule 2, nearly joined to the hindmarginal spot; in the apical part the black interneural folds are only indistinctly edged with grey; the hindwing is yellow-red above with black costal margin and broad black marginal band. In the female the forewmg is black-brown at the base as far as the hindmargin and has in the middle of the hindmargin a light yellow spot, which is only about 7 mm. in breadth but reaches at least to the middle of cellule 2; the subapical band is light yellow; the hindwing is light yellow as far as the middle and then very broadly blackish. -. Sierra Leone to Angola. albostriata Lathy has the hindwing marked as in the type-form, but the forewing differs in the absence of the subapical band, while its apical part bears long white stripes. Uganda. -rubrobasalis Auriv.[ now species Pseudacraea rubrobasalis agrees with albostriata as regards the forewing, but has in the female a sharply defined black marginal band, only 4 mm. in breadth, on the hindwing. Southern Congo: Katanga - pharsa Fruhst. was described from a male in which the subapical band of the forewing is white and the hindwing has a sharply defined marginal band only 1–2 mm. in breadth. Possibly the male of rubrobasalis. German East Africa. - usagarae Stgr. Both wings in the female red-brown above at the base; the red-brown colour on the forewing covers almost the whole of the cell and the base of cellules l-2; somewhat behind the middle of the hindmargin is placed a narrow light yellow band, which, however, extends scarcely or not at all beyond vein 2; the subapical band of the forewing and the broad median band of the hindwing are also light yellow; the marginal band of the hindwing is 6–8 mm. in breadth and not sharply defined proximally. The male is not known to me with certainty. German East Africa.

== Subspecies ==
- Pseudacraea dolomena dolomena (Nigeria, Cameroon, Gabon, Congo, Central African Republic, Angola, Democratic Republic of the Congo, Zambia)
- Pseudacraea dolomena albostriata Lathy, 1906 (Uganda: Lake Victoria)
- Pseudacraea dolomena congoensis Jackson, 1951 (eastern Democratic Republic of the Congo)
- Pseudacraea dolomena elgonensis Jackson, 1951 (Uganda: east to the western slopes of Mount Elgon, Kenya: slopes of Mount Elgon)
- Pseudacraea dolomena kayonza Jackson, 1956 (Uganda: south-west to Kigezi)
- Pseudacraea dolomena usagarae Staudinger, 1891 (north-eastern Tanzania)
