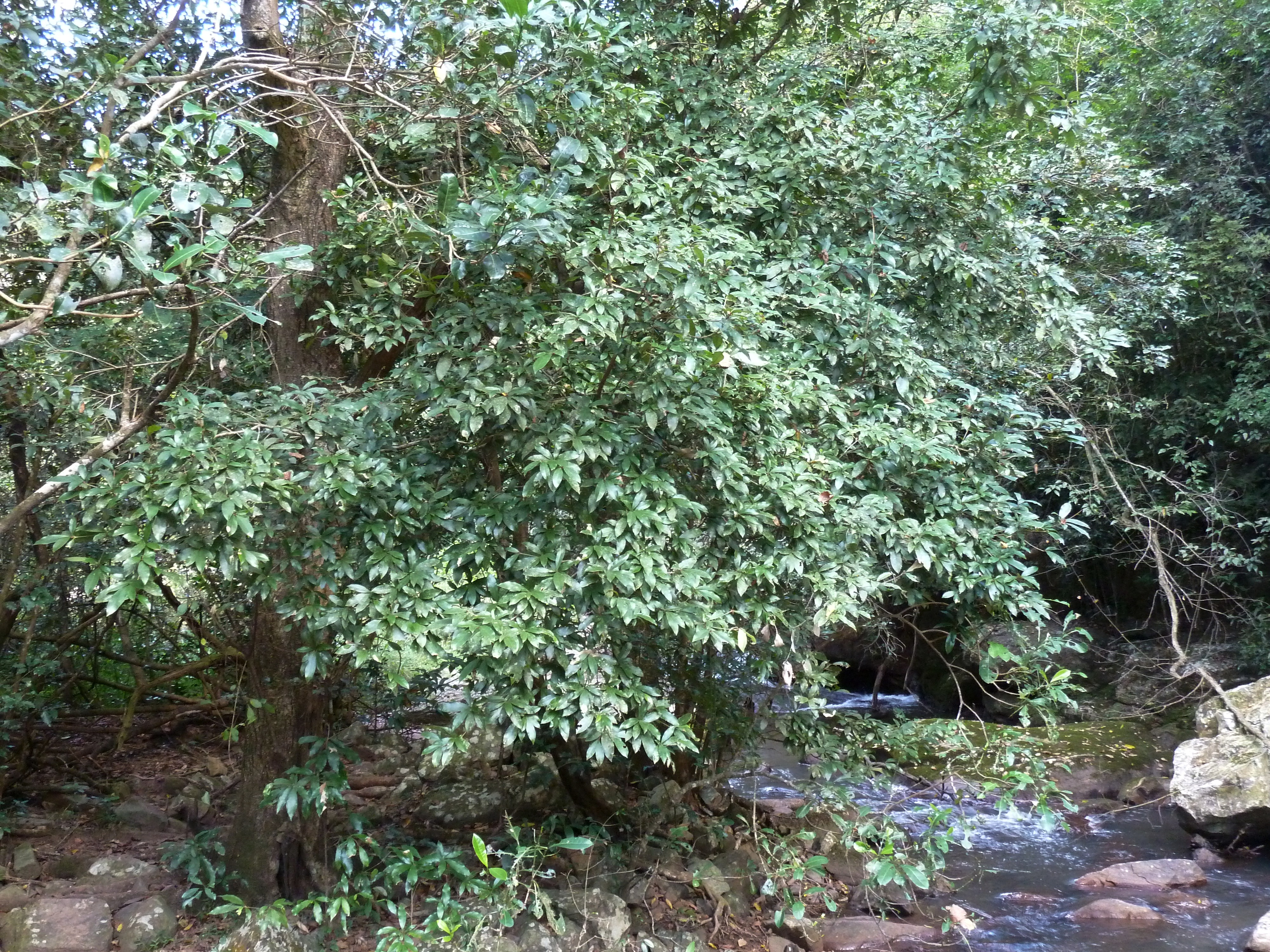
- In KwaZulu-Natal

Scientific classification
- Kingdom: Plantae
- Clade: Tracheophytes
- Clade: Angiosperms
- Clade: Eudicots
- Clade: Asterids
- Order: Ericales
- Family: Sapotaceae
- Genus: Englerophytum
- Species: E. natalense

Binomial name
- Englerophytum natalense (Sond.) T.D.Penn.

Synonyms
- Bequaertiodendron natalense (Sond.) Heine & J.H. Hemsl.; Chrysophyllum natalense Sond.

= Englerophytum natalense =

Silver-leaf milkplum

Species of tree

Englerophytum natalense, the silver-leaf milkplum, is a medium-sized, evergreen tree that occurs along forested escarpments from East Africa to South Africa. The leaves are alternately arranged or spiralled, and to some extent crowded near the ends of branches. They are glossy green to greyish-green above and covered in silvery hairs below. The stem is straight and the bark smooth. Young branches are covered with dense brownish hairs. The plant contains a milky latex.

It is a larval food plant of the butterflies Euptera pluto kinugnana, Pseudacraea boisduvalii trimeni, P. eurytus imitator and P. lucretia.

== Similar species ==
Manilkara discolor has rough bark, attains a larger size, and is native to drier regions.

== Gallery ==
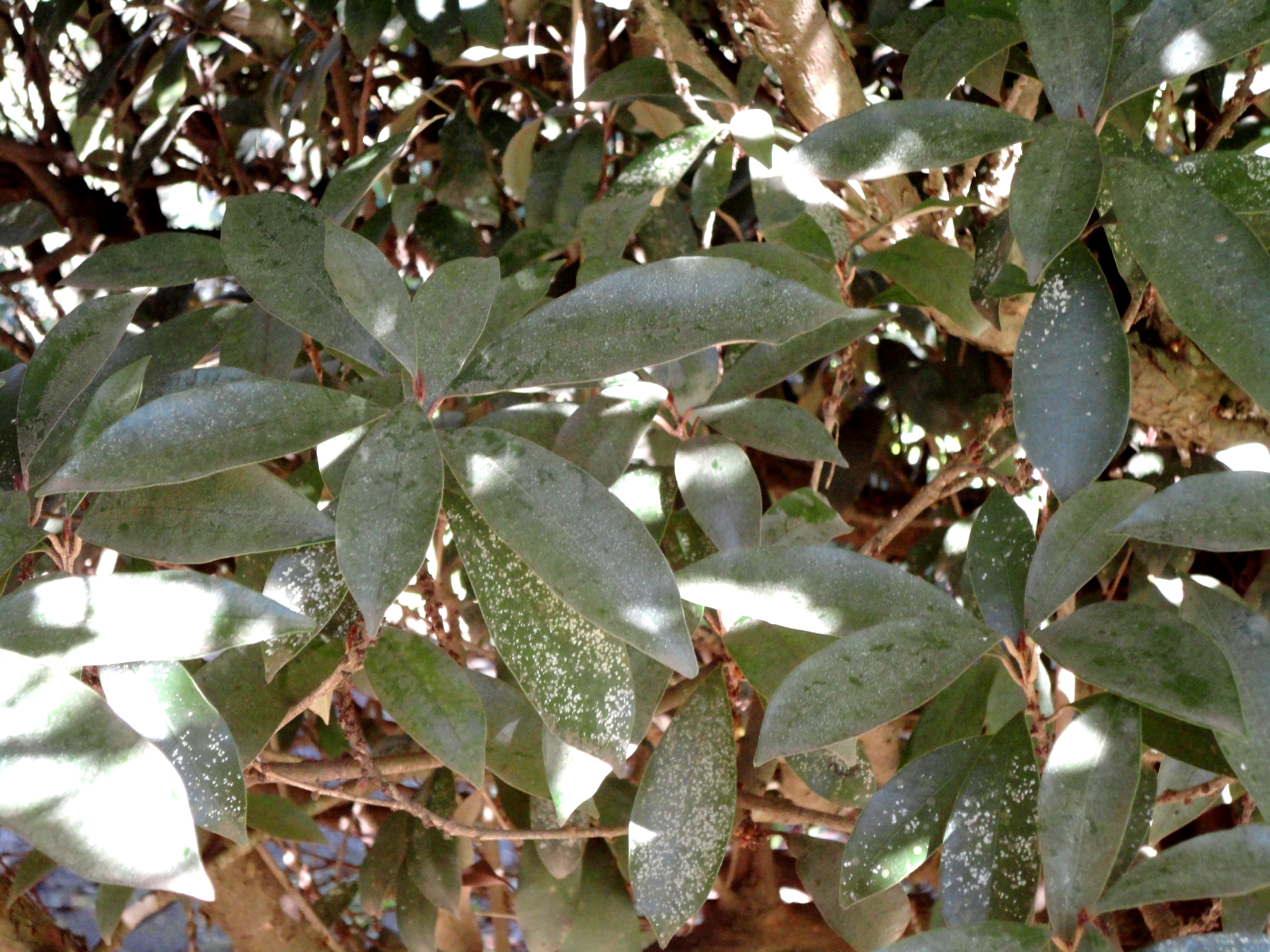
Foliage

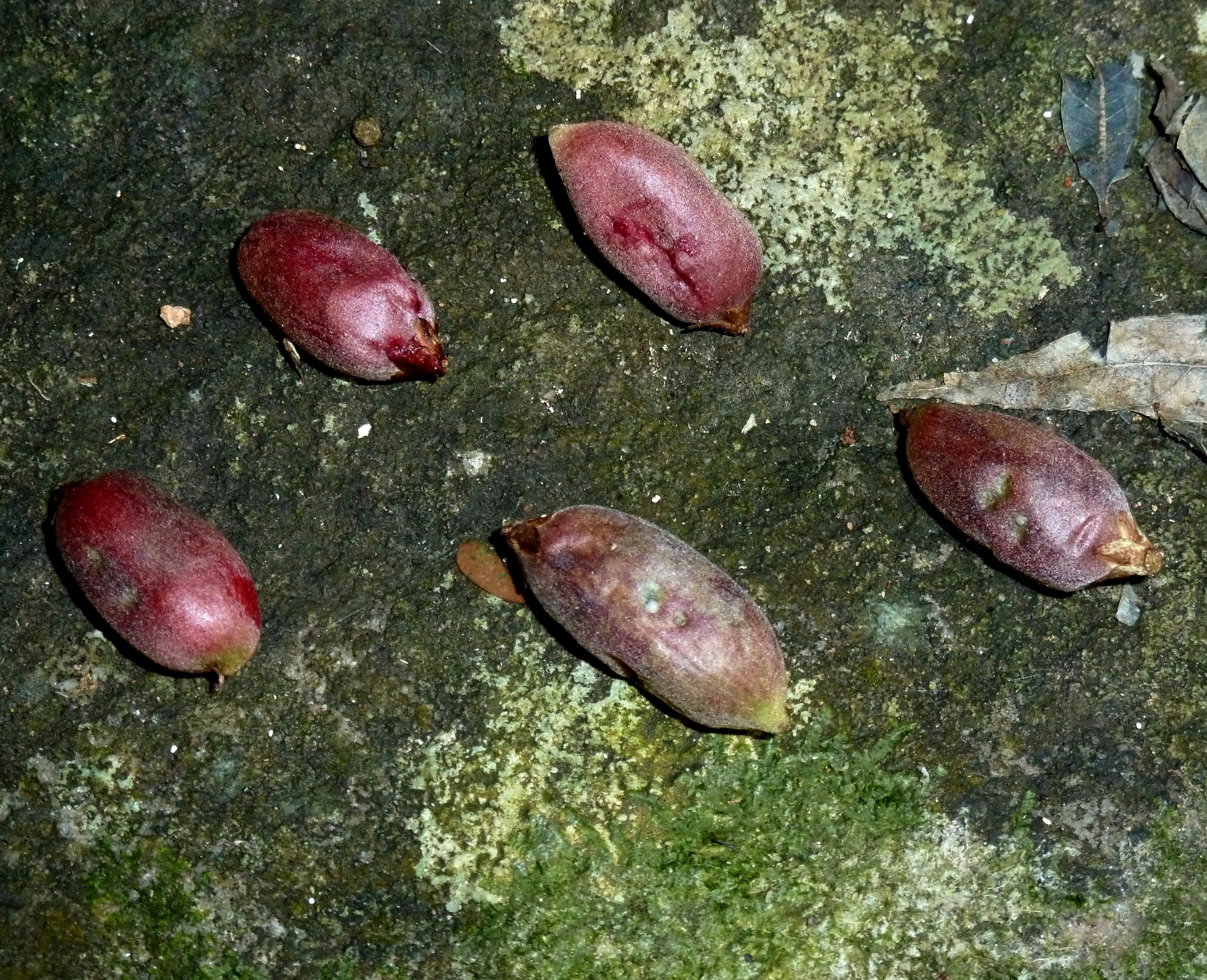
Ripe fruit
