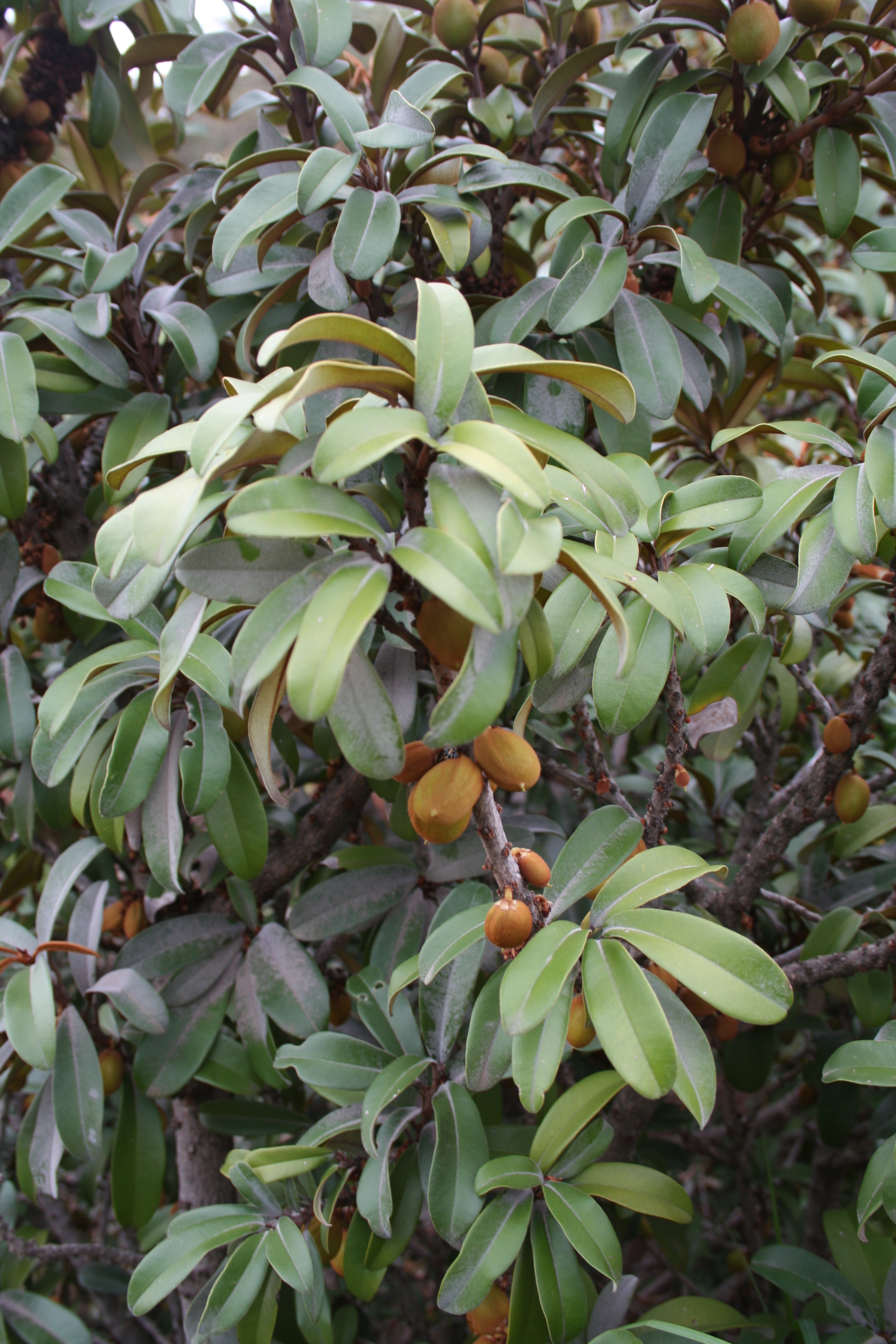

Scientific classification
- Kingdom: Plantae
- Clade: Tracheophytes
- Clade: Angiosperms
- Clade: Eudicots
- Clade: Asterids
- Order: Ericales
- Family: Sapotaceae
- Genus: Englerophytum
- Species: E. magalismontanum

Binomial name
- Englerophytum magalismontanum (Sond.) T.D.Penn.

Synonyms
- Bequaertiodendron magalismontanum (Sond.) Heine & J.H.Hemsl.; Chrysophyllum magalismontanum Sond.; Pouteria magalismontana (Sond.) A.Meeuse

= Englerophytum magalismontanum =

Transvaal milkplum

Species of tree

Englerophytum magalismontanum, commonly known as stamvrug, is an evergreen tree that mostly grows in rocky places. It has an extensive range, from northern KwaZulu-Natal northwards along the east coast and into the southern African interior, and northwards into tropical Africa.

== Nomenclature ==
E. magalismontanum was at various times in the past known under the names Bequaertiodendron magalismontanum (see: J. C. Bequaert), Pouteria magalismontana and Chrysophyllum magalismontanum. The specific name refers to the Magaliesberg from where the species was first described, and where it commonly occurs.

== Description ==
This tree is usually known by its Afrikaans name stamvrug ("stem fruit") which refers to its habit of bearing densely clustered fruit on the trunk and thicker branches (cauliflory), a common feature of this family. The fruit are sweet with very little pink flesh - they have high latex content and are leathery-skinned. The seed is large, smooth and hard, and is covered with a soft membrane. Their bisexual flowers are similarly crowded on the trunk and branches, and smell strongly of fermenting honey.

Stamvrug trees at maturity may range from 1 metre tall on exposed dip slopes with very limited soil where they are prone to stunting by fire, to about 15 metres in the shelter of kloofs (gorges) with ample water and deep soil. Crowns are densely leafy and rounded, branched almost to the base, with leaves crowded at ends of branches, densely covered in golden-brown velvety hairs below, and often with a whitish indumentum above.

== Relationships and associated species ==
The species is a larval food plant for the butterfly Pseudacraea boisduvali trimeni. It is closely related to Englerophytum natalense (Sond.) T.D.Penn. and Mimusops zeyheri Sond. and is often found in association with the latter.

It belongs to the family Sapotaceae with some 35 genera and 600 odd species, that are mostly trees with leathery, entire leaves. The family is present throughout the tropics and subtropics. They are rich in latex and yield substances like gutta-percha and balatá.

== Gallery ==
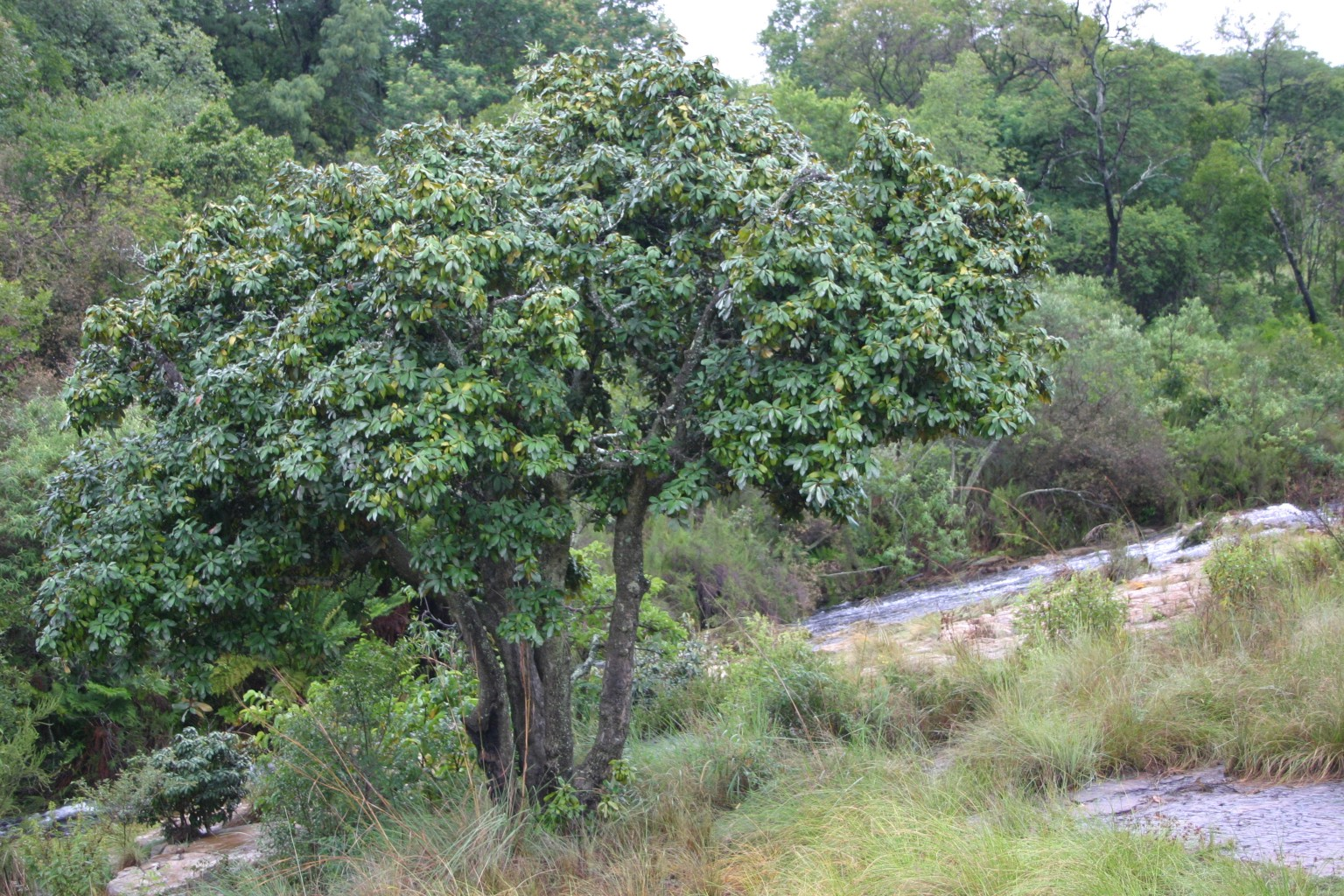
Habit and habitat

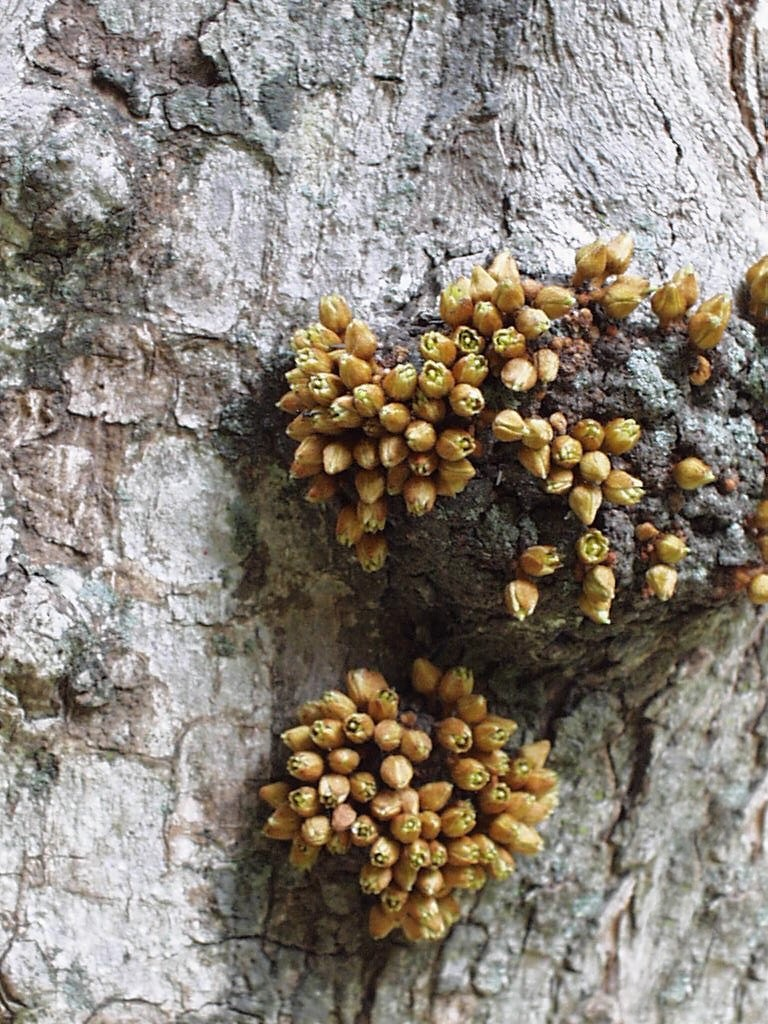
Flower clusters

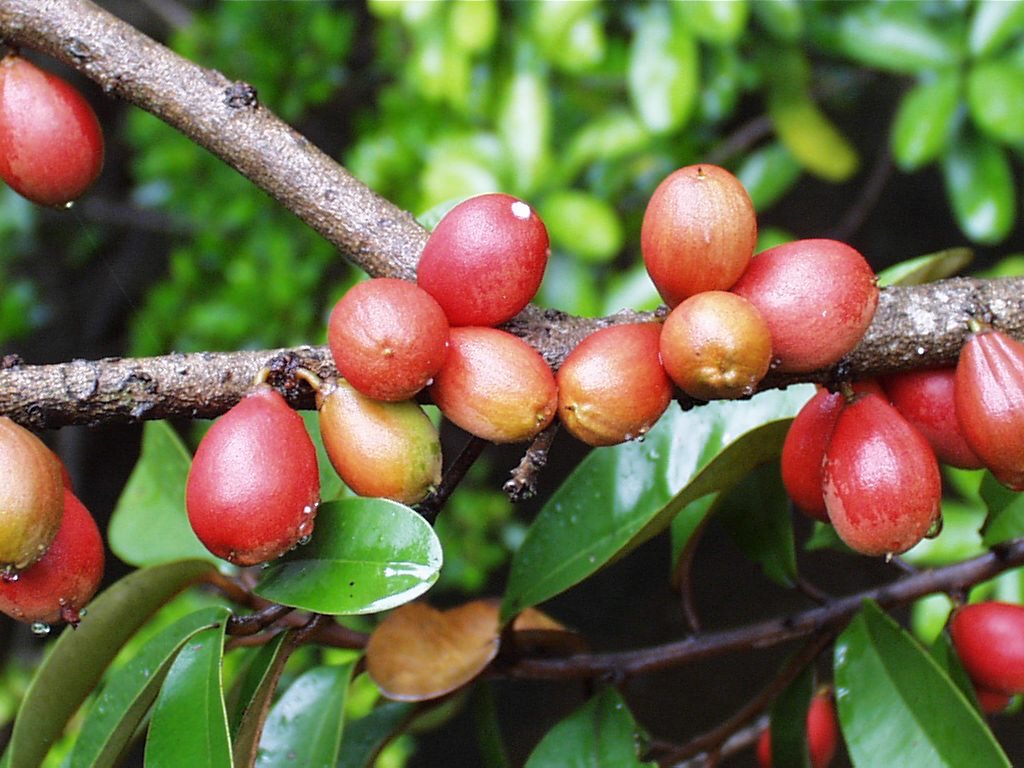
Ripe fruit

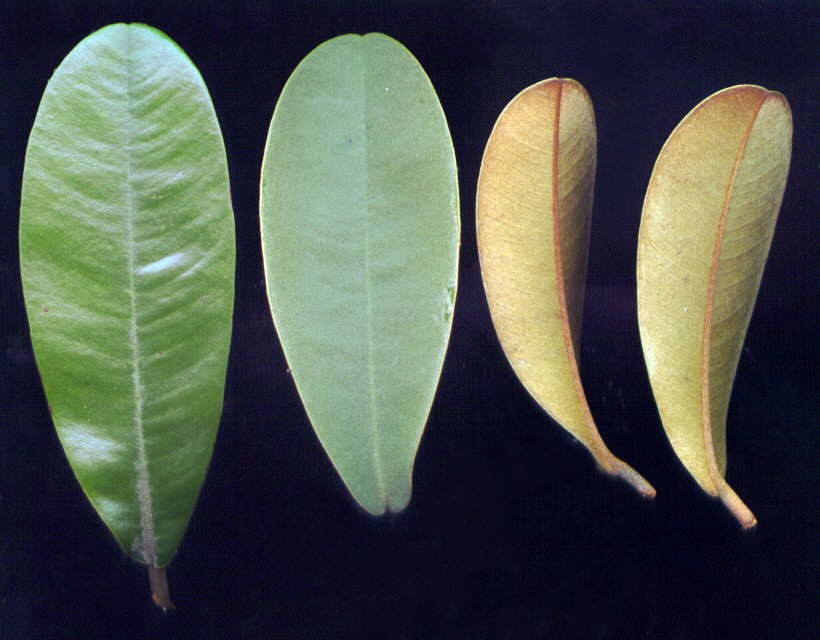
Leaf details: upper and undersides
