= Pseudacraea rubrobasalis =

Scientific classification
- Domain: Eukaryota
- Kingdom: Animalia
- Phylum: Arthropoda
- Class: Insecta
- Order: Lepidoptera
- Family: Nymphalidae
- Genus: Pseudacraea
- Species: P. rubrobasalis

Binomial name
- Pseudacraea rubrobasalis Aurivillius, 1903

Synonyms
- Pseudacraea dolomena var. rubrobasalis Aurivillius, 1903

Species of butterfly

Pseudacraea rubrobasalis, the lesser variable false acraea, is a butterfly in the family Nymphalidae. It is found in Nigeria, Cameroon, Gabon, the Republic of the Congo, the Democratic Republic of the Congo and Uganda.

== Description ==
Very similar to Pseudacraea dolomena q.v. for differentiation.

== Biology ==
The habitat consists of forests.

The larvae feed on Afrosersalisia species.
