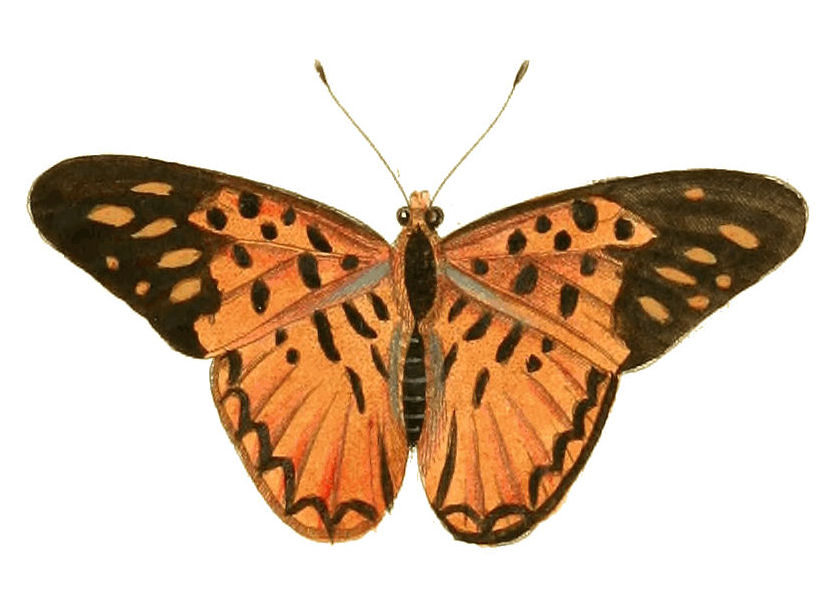
- Illustration by Dru Drury

Scientific classification
- Kingdom: Animalia
- Phylum: Arthropoda
- Clade: Pancrustacea
- Class: Insecta
- Order: Lepidoptera
- Family: Nymphalidae
- Genus: Pseudacraea
- Species: P. hostilia

Binomial name
- Pseudacraea hostilia (Drury, 1782)

Synonyms
- Papilio hostilia Drury, 1782; Papilio metea Stoll, 1790; Pseudacraea eurytus f. orthosia Hübner, 1819

= Pseudacraea hostilia =

Species of butterfly

Pseudacraea hostilia, the western incipient false acraea, is a butterfly in the family Nymphalidae. It is found in Sierra Leone, Liberia, Ivory Coast and western and central Ghana. The habitat consists of wetter forests.

== Description ==
Upperside: Antennae black. Thorax and abdomen dark brown. Anterior wings next the body dark tawny orange, but next the tips dark brown, almost black, the darkest part of the wings having several dusky yellow spots, while the orange part has a number of black ones. Posterior wings dark orange, near the body streaked with black, with a black zigzag border running along the external edges.

Underside: Palpi, neck, legs, and breast pale yellow. Abdomen orange. Anterior wings much lighter than on the upper side, being, next the body, cream colour; the part next the tips dark russet. All the spots are very discernible on this side, the yellow ones being here much lighter. Posterior wings cream-coloured, having the black border and streaks equally as strong and discernible as on the upper side. Margins of the wings entire. Wingspan 2 1/2 inches (64 mm).

Torben Larsen developed a species numbering system for his 2005 publication Butterflies of West Africa. This species is #889. The 'Larsen' numbers have since been used with permission in A Sharp Eye on Butterflies of Ghana.

== Description in Seitz ==
.

hostilia group. Basal part of both wings with black, usually rounded spots and the hindwing on both surfaces with sharply defined black marginal band, spotted with red-yellow, and entirely without black streaks on the interneural folds. Hindwing above for the most part and forewing at least at the hindmargin with red-yellow or red ground-colour. Ps. hostilia Drury is a rare Acraea-like species, differing quite considerably from all the others in the markings of the wings. The hindwing and the basal half of the forewing are red-yellow above with black spots, rounded on the forewing, but on the hindwing united into three transverse streaks; the apical half of the forewing is black with whitish or light yellow spots; the yellow marginal spots of the hindwing are large and proximally only bounded by narrow black lunules. The under surface is lighter and particularly at the base whitish. Sierra Leone to Ashanti. -warburgi Auriv. [ now species Pseudacraea warburgi] (46 c) is the more southern race and differs in having the yellow marginal spots on the upperside of the hindwing very small and proximally bounded by thick lunules united into a band. Cameroons and Congo.

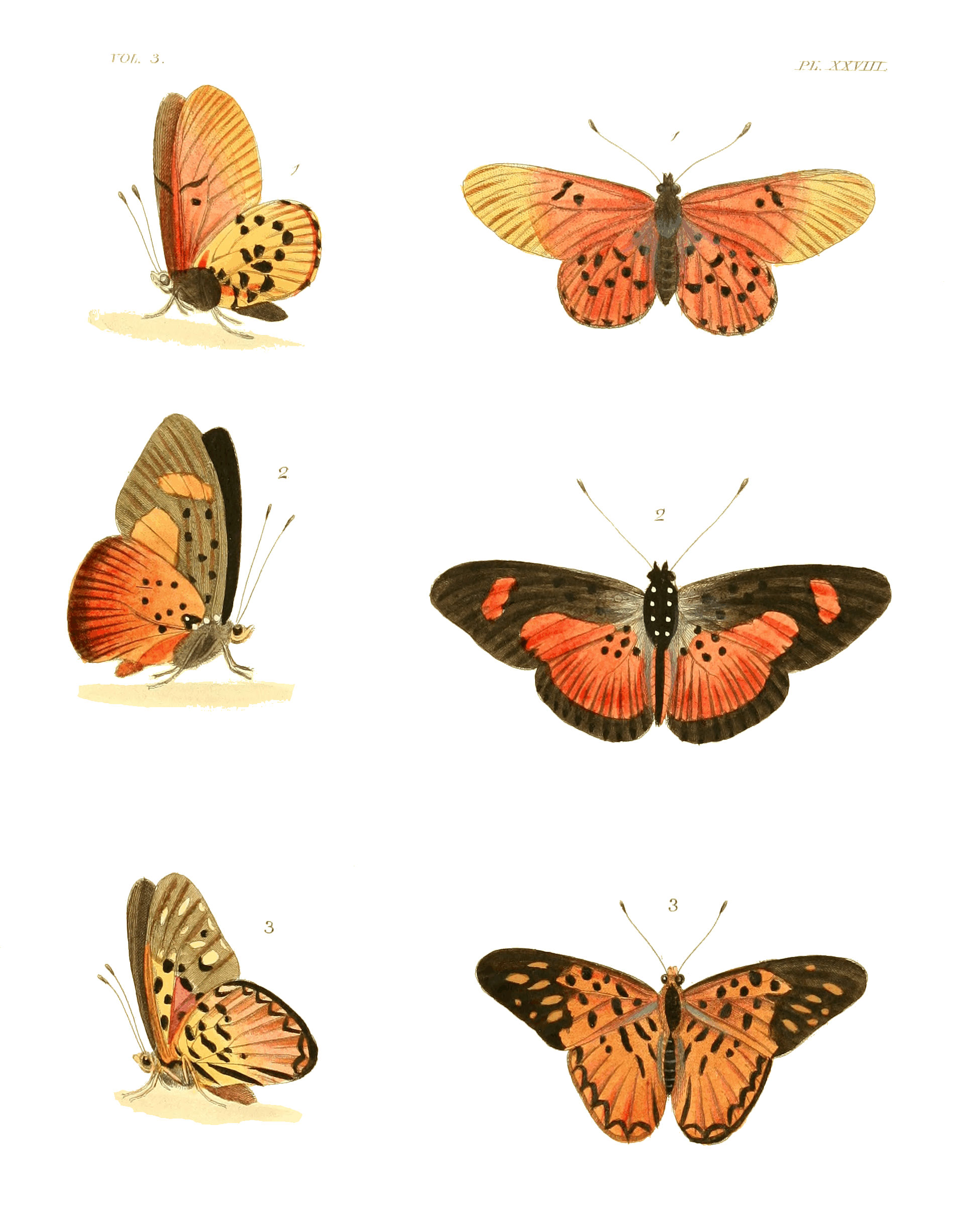
