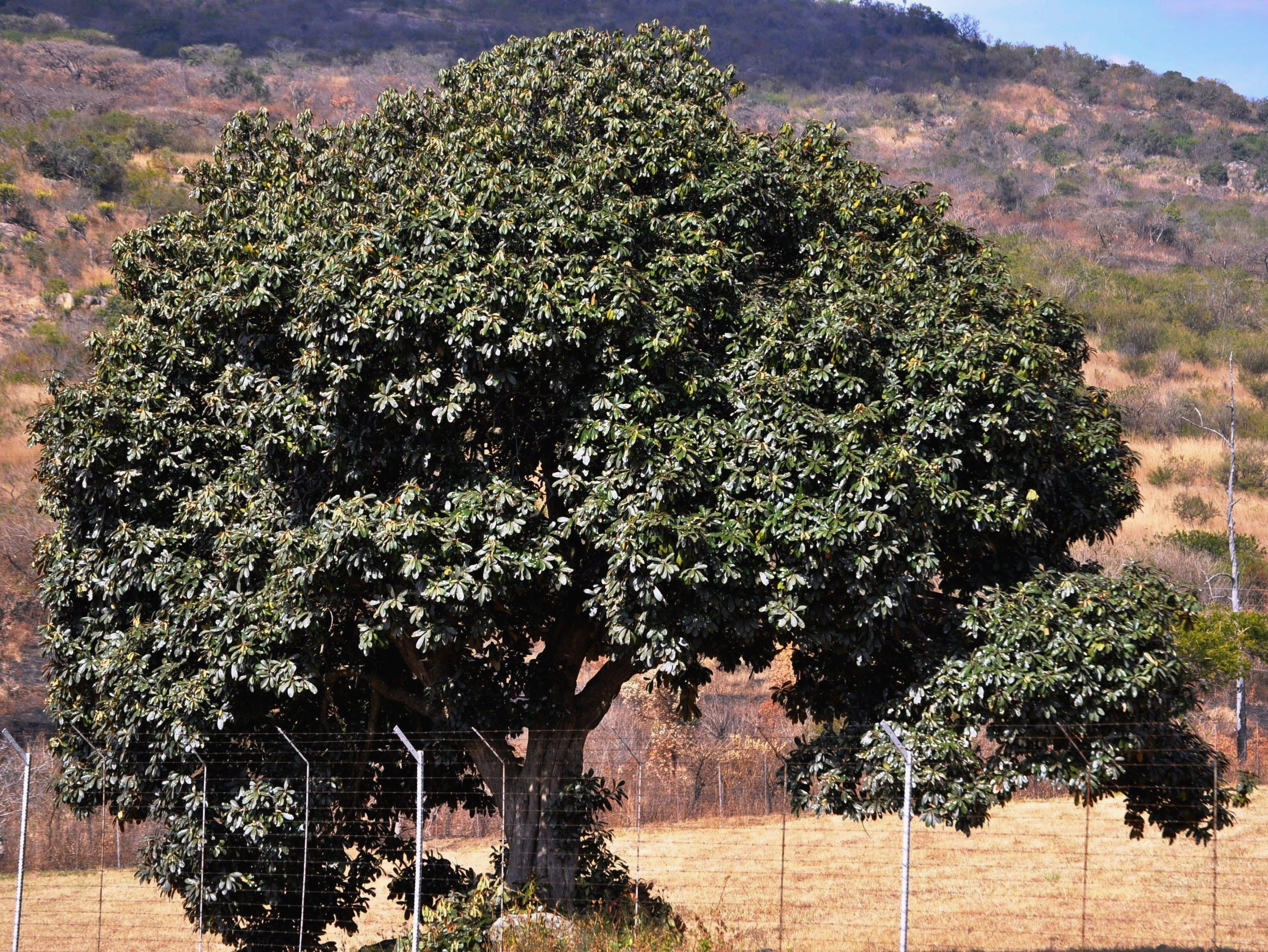
- E. magalismontanum in South Africa

Scientific classification
- Kingdom: Plantae
- Clade: Tracheophytes
- Clade: Angiosperms
- Clade: Eudicots
- Clade: Asterids
- Order: Ericales
- Family: Sapotaceae
- Subfamily: Chrysophylloideae
- Genus: Englerophytum; K.Krause
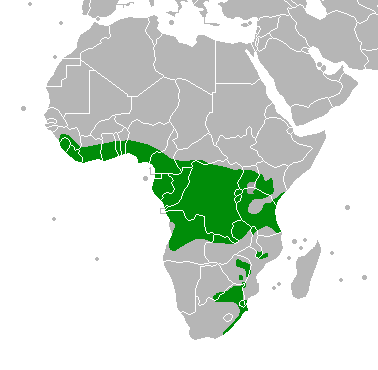
- Approximate range of genus

Synonyms
- Bequaertiodendron De Wild.; Boivinella Pierre ex Aubrév. & Pellegr. 1958, illegitimate homonym, not A.Camus 1925 (Boivinella in Poaceae); Neoboivinella Aubrév. & Pellegr.; Pseudoboivinella Aubrév. & Pellegr.; Tisserantiodoxa Aubrév. & Pellegr.; Wildemaniodoxa Aubrév. & Pellegr.; Zeyherella (Engl.) Pierre ex Aubrév. & Pellegr.

= Englerophytum =

Milkplums

Genus of flowering plants

Englerophytum is a group of trees in the family Sapotaceae described as a genus in 1914.

Englerophytum consists primarily of trees. Their leaves are leathery with dense appressed hairs on the undersides. The genus is widespread across tropical and southern Africa. It is found in the countries of Angola, Benin, Botswana, Burundi, Cameroon, Central African Republic, Republic of Congo, Democratic Republic of the Congo (DRC), Equatorial Guinea, Eswatini, Gabon, Ghana, Guinea, Ivory Coast, Kenya, Liberia, Malawi, Mozambique, Nigeria, Rwanda, Sierra Leone, South Africa ( KwaZulu-Natal, Cape Province and Northern Provinces) Tanzania, Togo, Uganda, Zambia and Zimbabwe.

The genus name of Englerophytum is in honour of Adolf Engler (1844–1930), a German botanist, and also; phytum, a Greek word meaning "plant".

== Species ==
The genus contains the following species:

1. Englerophytum congolense (De Wild.) Aubrév. & Pellegr. — Gabon, DRC
2. Englerophytum ferrugineum L.Gaut. & O.Lachenaud — Gabon
3. Englerophytum gigantifolium O.Lachenaud & L.Gaut. — Gabon
4. Englerophytum iturense (Engl.) L.Gaut. — Gabon, DRC
5. Englerophytum koulamoutouense (Aubrév. & Pellegr.) ined. — Gabon, Republic of Congo
6. Englerophytum laurentii (De Wild.) ined. — from Cameroon to Angola
7. Englerophytum le-testui (Aubrév. & Pellegr.) ined. — Gabon, Republic of Congo
8. Englerophytum libenii O.Lachenaud & L.Gaut. — Cameroon, Gabon
9. Englerophytum longipedicellatum (De Wild.) ined. — Gabon, DRC
10. Englerophytum magalismontanum (Sond.) T.D.Penn. — Tanzania, Angola, Malawi, Mozambique, Zambia, Zimbabwe, Botswana, KwaZulu-Natal, Limpopo, Mpumalanga, Eswatini
11. Englerophytum mayumbense (Greves) ined. — Gabon, Republic of Congo, Angola (Cabinda)
12. Englerophytum natalense (Sond.) T.D.Penn. — Kenya, Uganda, Tanzania, Malawi, Mozambique, Zimbabwe, KwaZulu-Natal, Limpopo, Mpumalanga, Eswatini, Cape Province
13. Englerophytum oblanceolatum (S.Moore) T.D.Penn. — W + C Africa from Liberia to Kenya
14. Englerophytum oubanguiense (Aubrév. & Pellegr.) Aubrév. & Pellegr. — W + C Africa
15. Englerophytum paludosum L.Gaut., Burgt & O.Lachenaud — Cameroon to Republic of Congo
16. Englerophytum rwandense (Troupin) ined. — Rwanda, Burundi
17. Englerophytum somiferanum Aubrév. — Gabon
18. Englerophytum stelechantha K.Krause — Cameroon, Gabon, Republic of Congo
19. Englerophytum sylverianum Kenfack & L.Gaut. — Cameroon to Equatorial Guinea

== Gallery ==
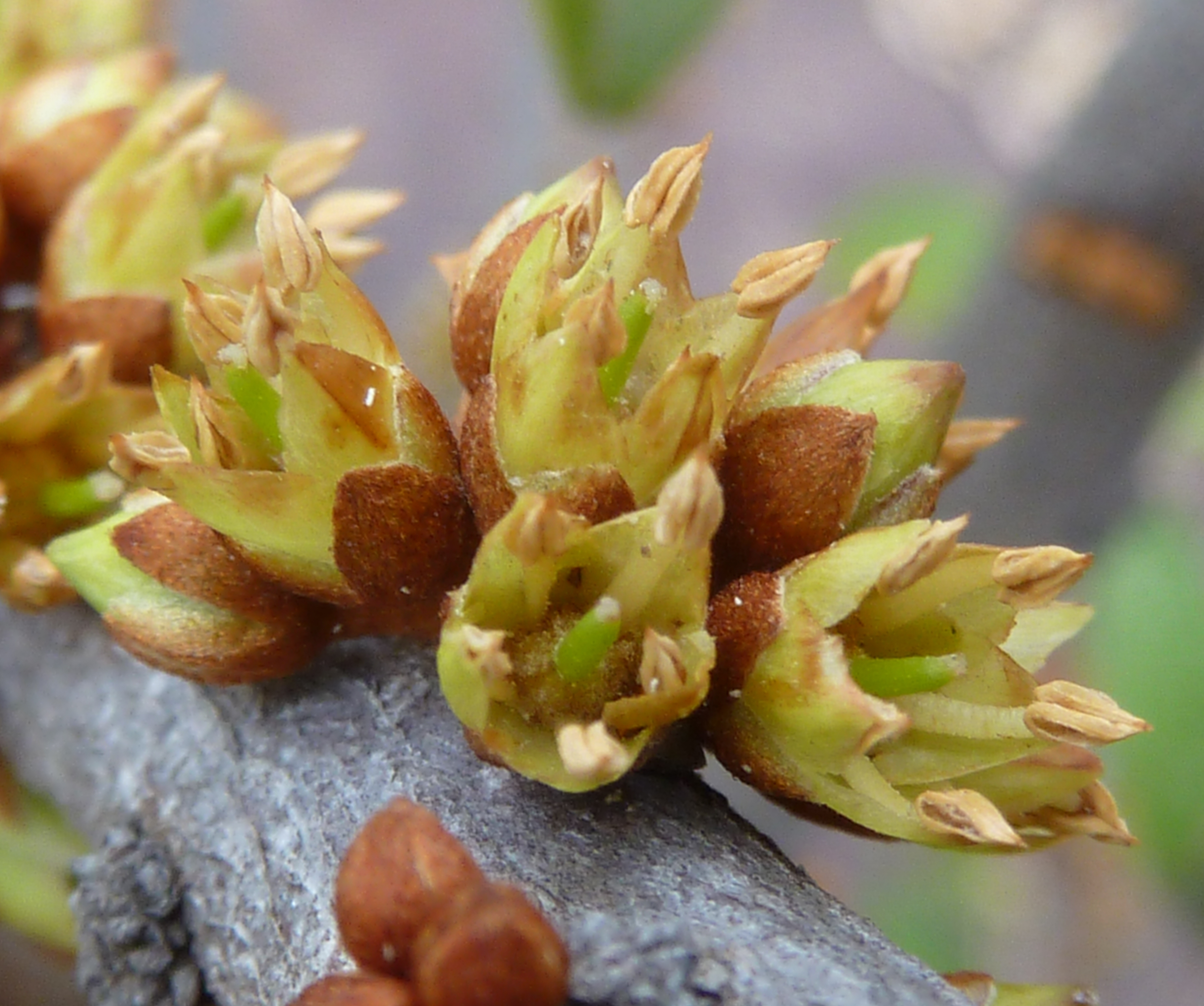
flower: 5 petals and 5 sepals

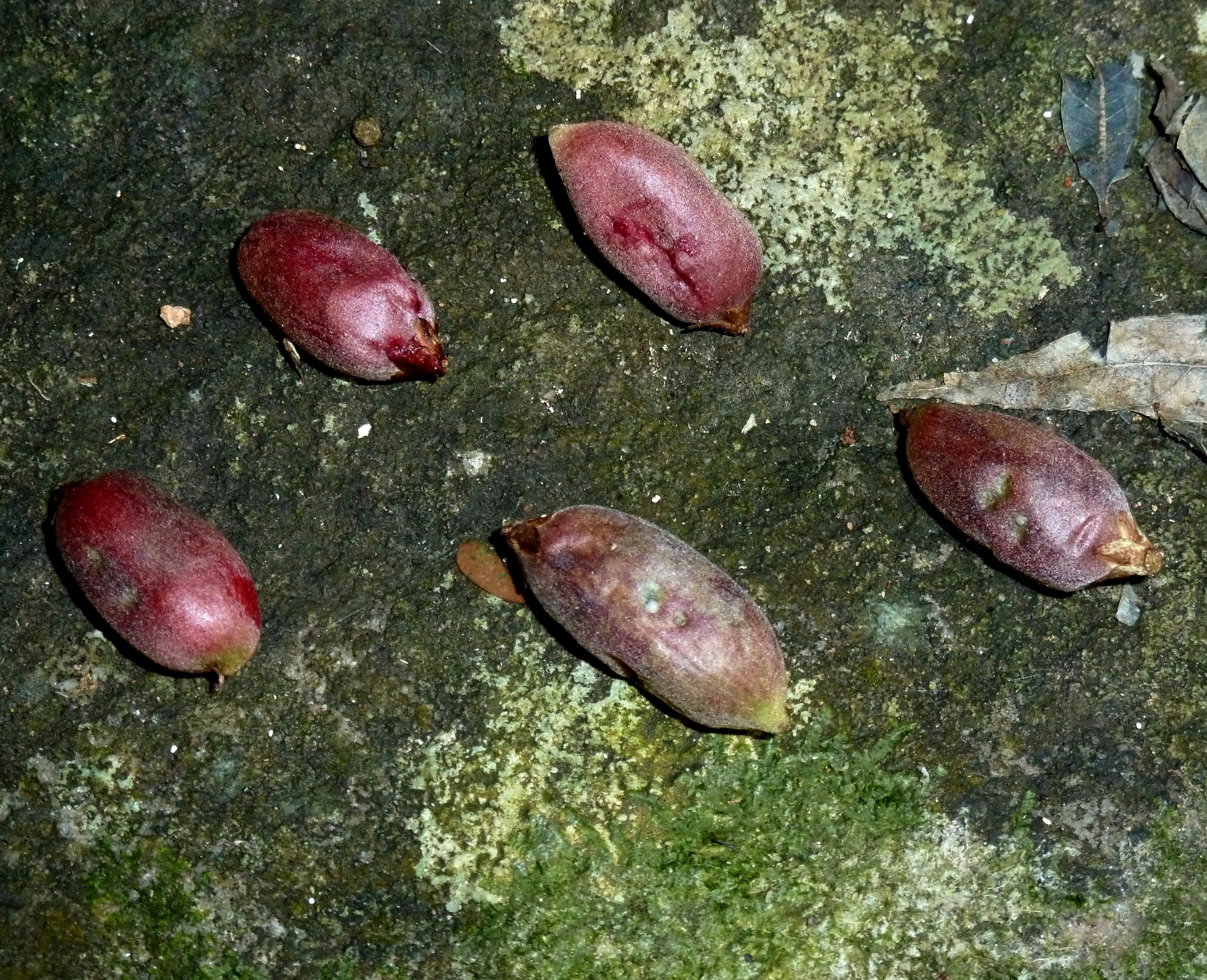
fruit: a berry containing 1 seed
