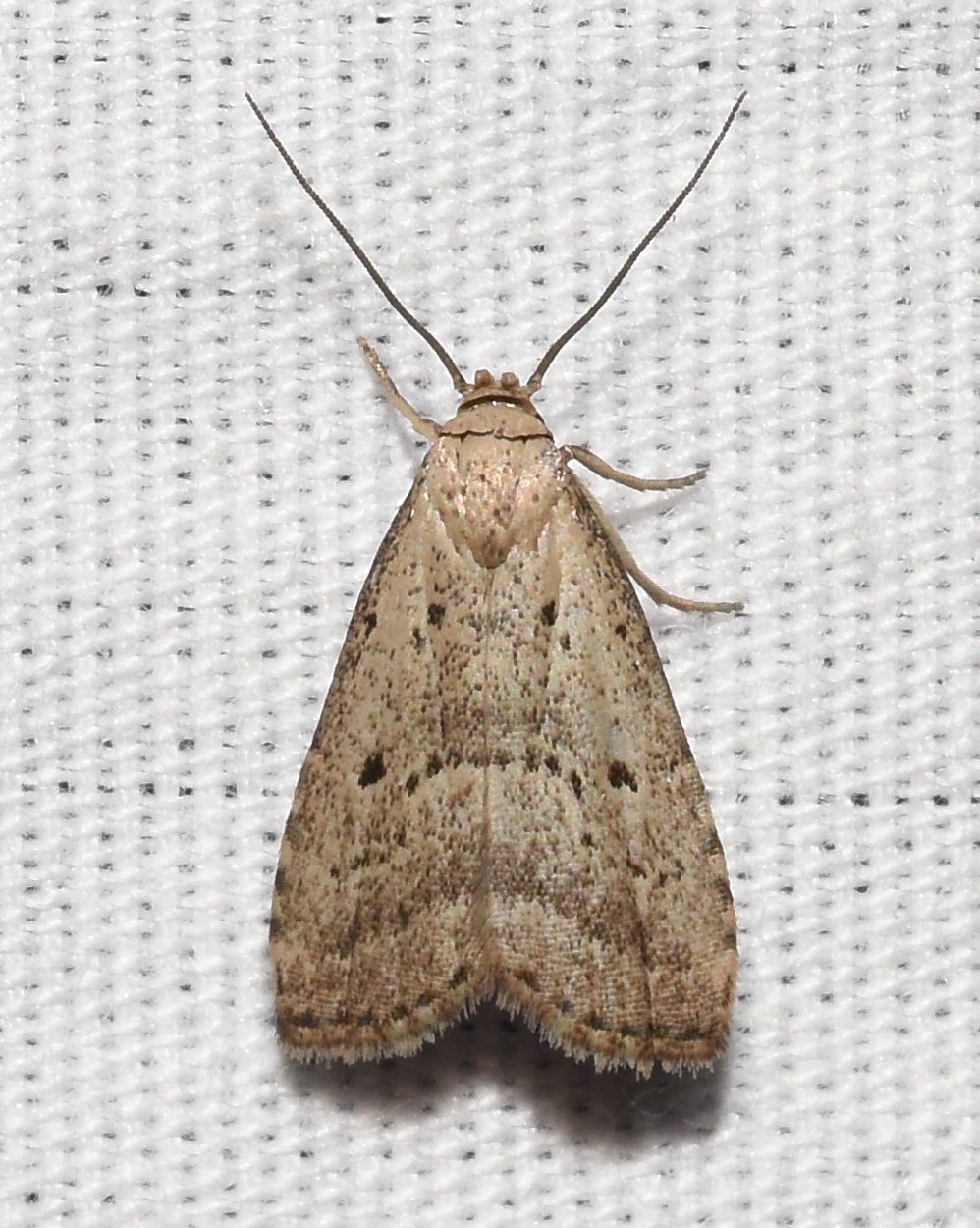

Scientific classification
- Kingdom: Animalia
- Phylum: Arthropoda
- Clade: Pancrustacea
- Class: Insecta
- Order: Lepidoptera
- Superfamily: Noctuoidea
- Family: Erebidae
- Genus: Hypenodes
- Species: H. fractilinea

Binomial name
- Hypenodes fractilinea (J. B. Smith, 1908)

Synonyms
- Thalpochares fractilinea J. B. Smith, 1908

= Hypenodes fractilinea =

Species of moth

Hypenodes fractilinea, the broken-line hypenodes, is a species of moth in the family Erebidae. The species was described by John B. Smith in 1908. It is found from Nova Scotia south to North Carolina, west across Canada to Alberta. The habitat consists of mixed wood and deciduous woodland.

They are on wing from late June to mid-August.
