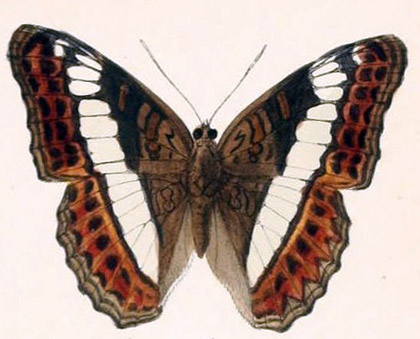
- Sumalia zulema

Scientific classification
- Domain: Eukaryota
- Kingdom: Animalia
- Phylum: Arthropoda
- Class: Insecta
- Order: Lepidoptera
- Family: Nymphalidae
- Tribe: Limenitidini
- Genus: Sumalia; Moore, [1898]

Species
- See text

= Sumalia =

Genus of brush-footed butterflies

Sumalia is a genus of butterflies found in Southeast Asia ranging from the Indian Himalayan Region to the Sunda Islands.

== Species ==
- Sumalia agneya (Doherty, 1891)
- Sumalia chilo (Grose-Smith, 1897)
- Sumalia daraxa (Doubleday, [1848])
- Sumalia zulema (Doubleday, [1848])
