= Hypenodes anatolica =

Scientific classification
- Domain: Eukaryota
- Kingdom: Animalia
- Phylum: Arthropoda
- Class: Insecta
- Order: Lepidoptera
- Superfamily: Noctuoidea
- Family: Erebidae
- Genus: Hypenodes
- Species: H. anatolica

Binomial name
- Hypenodes anatolica Schwingenschuss, 1938

Synonyms
- Hypenodes nigritalis Ronkay, 1984

Species of moth

Hypenodes anatolica is a species of moth in the family Erebidae. It was described by Leo Schwingenschuss in 1938. It is found in Bulgaria, Greece, North Macedonia and Turkey.
