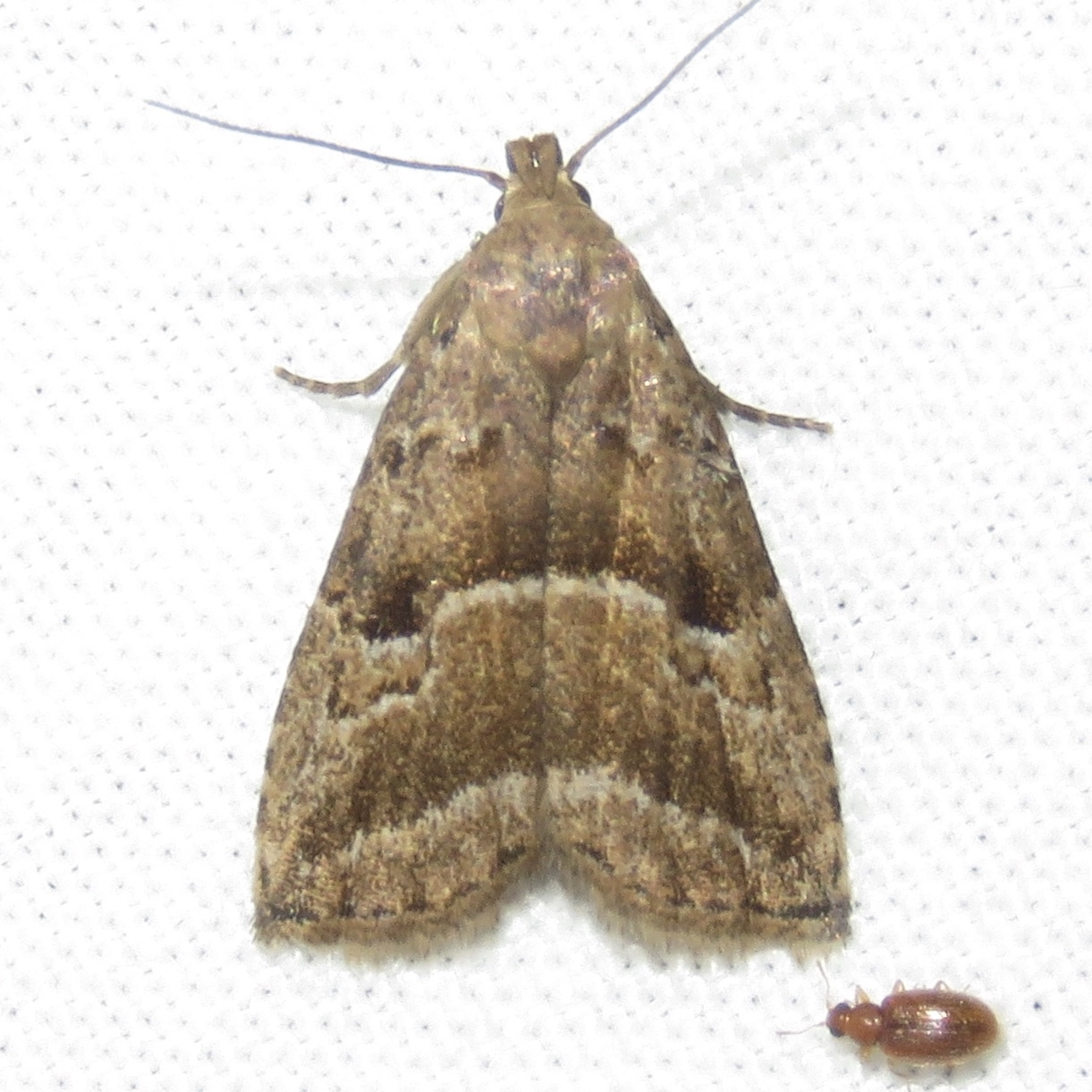

Scientific classification
- Kingdom: Animalia
- Phylum: Arthropoda
- Clade: Pancrustacea
- Class: Insecta
- Order: Lepidoptera
- Superfamily: Noctuoidea
- Family: Erebidae
- Genus: Hypenodes
- Species: H. caducus

Binomial name
- Hypenodes caducus (Dyar, 1907)

Synonyms
- Menopsimus caducus Dyar, 1907

= Hypenodes caducus =

Species of moth

Hypenodes caducus, the large hypenodes moth, is a species of moth in the family Erebidae. It was described by Harrison Gray Dyar Jr. in 1907. It is found in North America, including British Columbia, Maryland, Massachusetts, Michigan, Minnesota, New York, Ohio, Ontario, Quebec, South Carolina and Wisconsin.

The wingspan is 12–15 mm.
