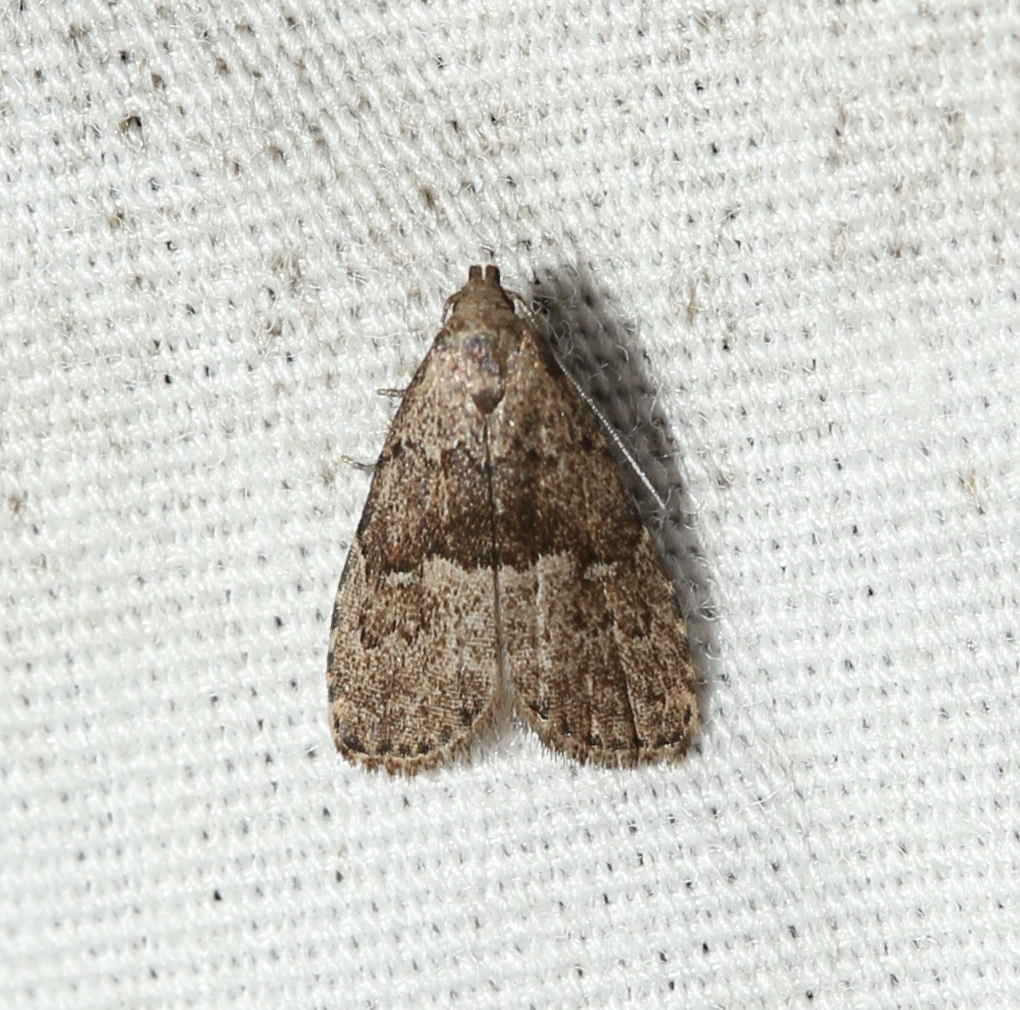

Scientific classification
- Kingdom: Animalia
- Phylum: Arthropoda
- Clade: Pancrustacea
- Class: Insecta
- Order: Lepidoptera
- Superfamily: Noctuoidea
- Family: Erebidae
- Genus: Hypenodes
- Species: H. franclemonti

Binomial name
- Hypenodes franclemonti Ferguson, 1954

= Hypenodes franclemonti =

Species of moth

Hypenodes franclemonti is a species of moth in the family Erebidae. It was described by Douglas C. Ferguson in 1954. It is found in North America, including Florida, Michigan, Minnesota, Missouri, Pennsylvania and Quebec.
