= Hypenodes palustris =

Scientific classification
- Kingdom: Animalia
- Phylum: Arthropoda
- Clade: Pancrustacea
- Class: Insecta
- Order: Lepidoptera
- Superfamily: Noctuoidea
- Family: Erebidae
- Genus: Hypenodes
- Species: H. palustris

Binomial name
- Hypenodes palustris Ferguson, 1954

Species of moth

Hypenodes palustris is a species of moth in the family Erebidae. It was described by Douglas C. Ferguson in 1954. It is found in North America, including Alaska, Maryland, Minnesota, New Brunswick, Nova Scotia, Ontario, Quebec and Wisconsin.
