= Hypenodes orientalis =

Scientific classification
- Kingdom: Animalia
- Phylum: Arthropoda
- Class: Insecta
- Order: Lepidoptera
- Superfamily: Noctuoidea
- Family: Erebidae
- Genus: Hypenodes
- Species: H. orientalis

Binomial name
- Hypenodes orientalis Staudinger, 1901

Synonyms
- Hypenodes kalchbergi orientalis Staudinger, 1901

Species of moth

Hypenodes orientalis is a species of moth in the family Erebidae. It was described by Staudinger in 1901. It is found in Turkey, the Near East, Armenia and the southern Caucasus.
