= Hypenodes kalchbergi =

Scientific classification
- Kingdom: Animalia
- Phylum: Arthropoda
- Clade: Pancrustacea
- Class: Insecta
- Order: Lepidoptera
- Superfamily: Noctuoidea
- Family: Erebidae
- Genus: Hypenodes
- Species: H. kalchbergi

Binomial name
- Hypenodes kalchbergi Staudinger, 1876

Species of moth

Hypenodes kalchbergi is a species of moth in the family Erebidae. It was described by Otto Staudinger in 1876. It is found in Slovenia, the former Yugoslavia and on Sicily.

The wingspan is 12–15 mm.
