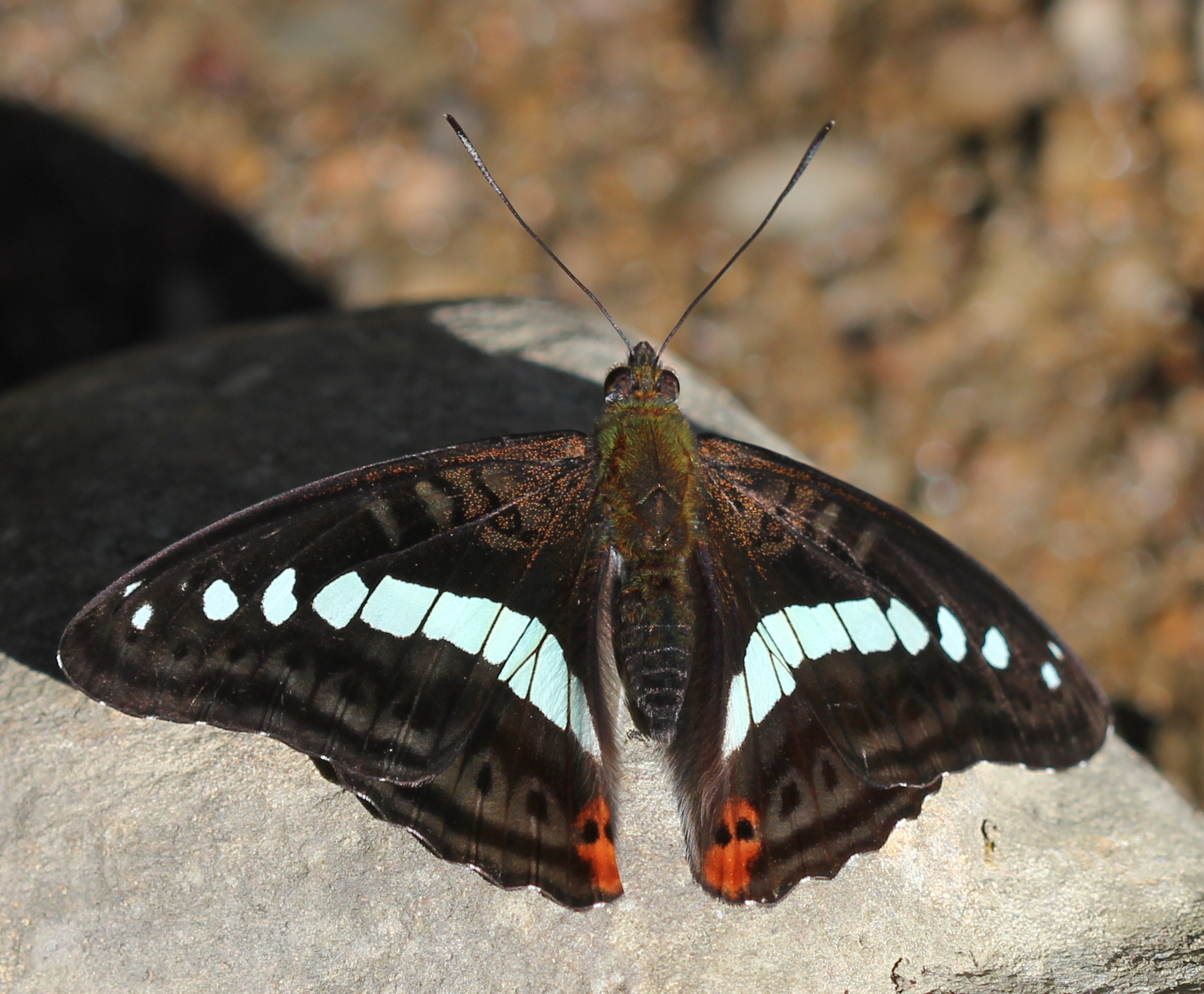

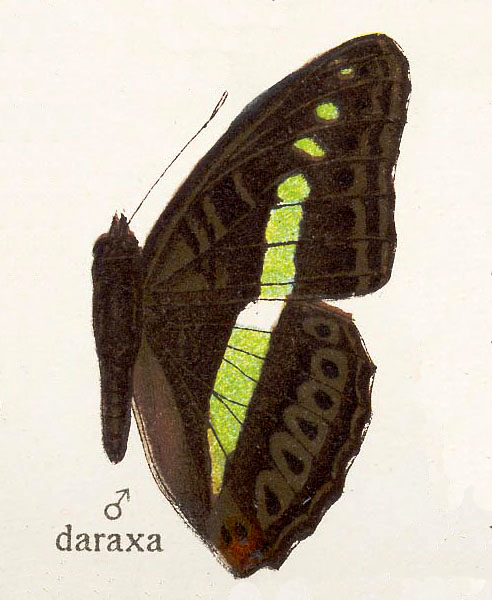
- Male

Scientific classification
- Kingdom: Animalia
- Phylum: Arthropoda
- Class: Insecta
- Order: Lepidoptera
- Family: Nymphalidae
- Genus: Sumalia
- Species: S. daraxa

Binomial name
- Sumalia daraxa (Doubleday, 1848)

= Sumalia daraxa =

Green commodore

Species of butterfly

Sumalia daraxa, the green commodore, is a species of nymphalid butterfly found in tropical and subtropical Asia.(Himalayas, NE.India, N.Burma, Malaya, Borneo, Indo-China).The wingspan is 60 to 70 millimeters.The upper surface of the forewings in both females and males is dark brown. A light green band extends across the postdiscal region on both pairs of wings, breaking up into spots towards the apex on the forewings . However, the green hue fades with age. A row of round black spots is visible in the submarginal region of the upper surface of the hindwings. An orange-red spot stands out at the anal angle . On the reddish-brown undersides of the wings, the pattern of the uppersides is somewhat paler and includes white bands. The basal region of the hindwings is cream-colored.
