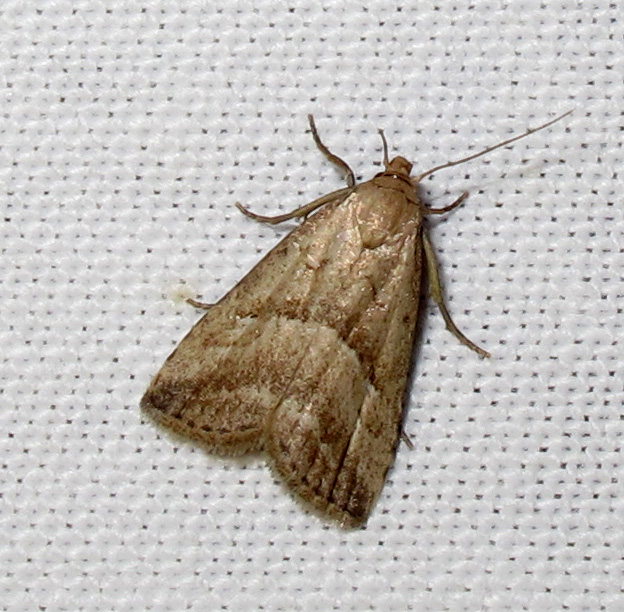
- Hypenodes humidalis

Scientific classification
- Kingdom: Animalia
- Phylum: Arthropoda
- Clade: Pancrustacea
- Class: Insecta
- Order: Lepidoptera
- Superfamily: Noctuoidea
- Family: Erebidae
- Subfamily: Hypenodinae
- Genus: Hypenodes; Doubleday, 1850

Synonyms
- Schrankia Herrich-Schäffer, [1851] (preocc. Hübner, [1825]); Tholomiges Lederer, 1857; Menopsimus Dyar, 1907

= Hypenodes =

Genus of moths

Hypenodes is a genus of moths of the family Erebidae erected by Henry Doubleday in 1850.

== Taxonomy ==
The genus has previously been classified in the subfamily Strepsimaninae of the family Noctuidae.

== Description ==
Palpi with second joint long and fringed with long hair above. Third joint short, naked and oblique. Frontal tuft is short. Antennae ringed and minutely ciliated in male. Thorax smoothly scaled. Abdomen with a basal dorsal tuft and almost naked tibia in legs. Forewings long and narrow. Veins 6 and 7 from near end of ell and stalked veins 8, 10 where vein 9 absent. Hindwings with veins 3,4 and 6,7 stalked. Vein 5 arise from middle of discocellulars.

== Species ==
- The humidalis species group
  - Hypenodes caducus Dyar, 1907 – large hypenodes moth
  - Hypenodes curvilinea Sugi, 1982
  - Hypenodes fractilinea J. B. Smith, 1908 – broken-line hypenodes moth
  - Hypenodes franclemonti Ferguson, 1954
  - Hypenodes humidalis Doubleday, 1850 - marsh oblique-barred moth
  - Hypenodes palustris Ferguson, 1954 (misspelled Hypenodes plaustris)
  - Hypenodes rectifascia Sugi, 1982
  - Hypenodes sombrus Ferguson, 1954
- The kalchbergi species group
  - Hypenodes kalchbergi Staudinger, 1876
- The orientalis species group
  - Hypenodes anatolica Schwingenschuss, 1938
  - Hypenodes crimeana Fibiger, Pekarsky & Ronkay, 2010
  - Hypenodes cypriaca Fibiger, Pekarsky & Ronkay, 2010
  - Hypenodes nesiota Rebel, 1916
  - Hypenodes orientalis Staudinger, 1901
  - Hypenodes pannonica Fibiger, Pekarsky & Ronkay, 2010
  - Hypenodes turcomanica Fibiger, Pekarsky & Ronkay, 2010
- Species group unknown
  - Hypenodes dubia Schaus, 1913
  - Hypenodes haploa D. S. Fletcher, 1961
  - Hypenodes insciens Dognin, 1914
  - Hypenodes minimalis Snellen, 1890
  - Hypenodes modesta Schaus, 1913
  - Hypenodes obliqualis Snellen, 1890
  - Hypenodes prionodes D. S. Fletcher, 1961
  - Hypenodes pudicalis Snellen, 1890
