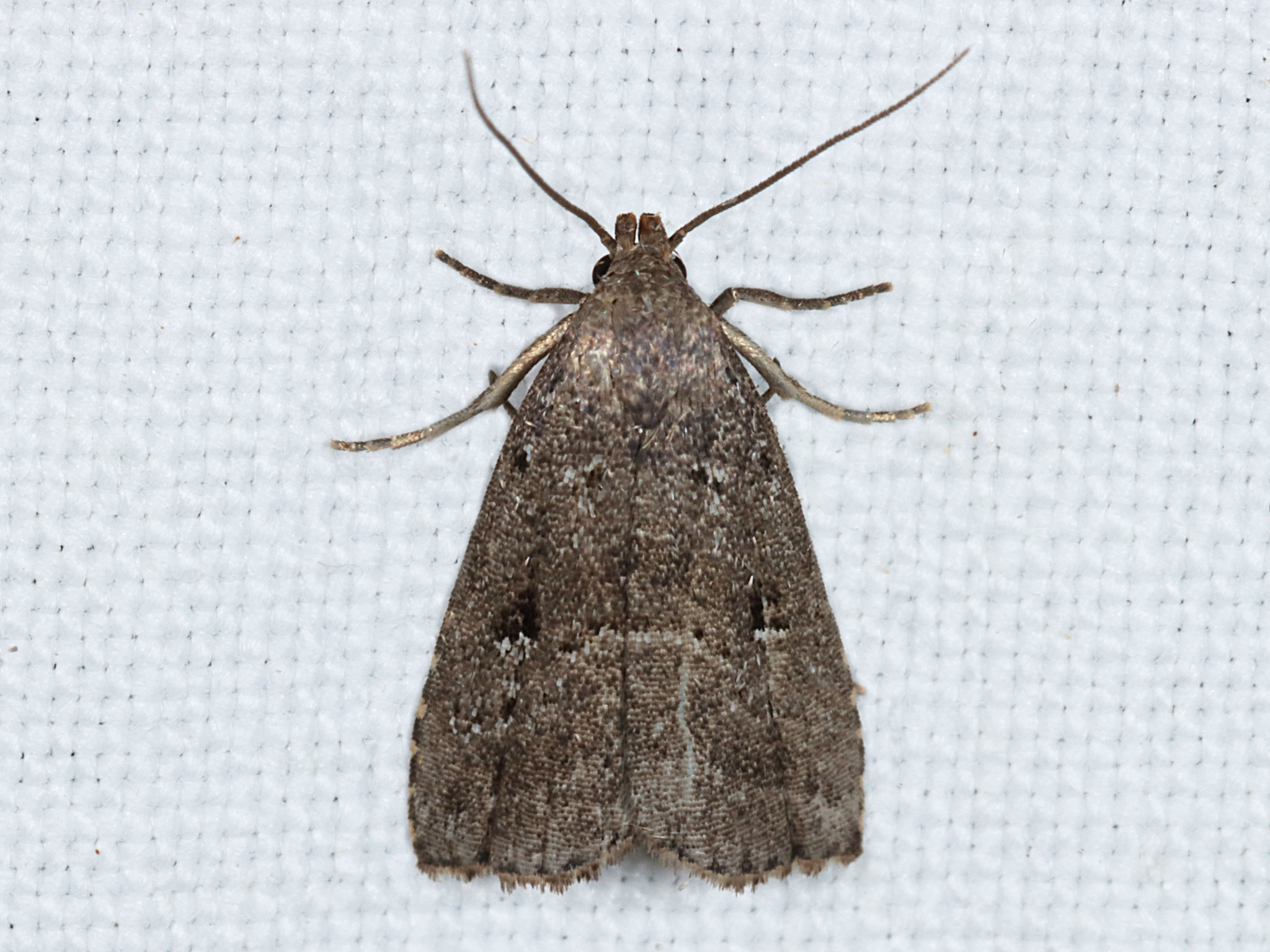

Scientific classification
- Kingdom: Animalia
- Phylum: Arthropoda
- Clade: Pancrustacea
- Class: Insecta
- Order: Lepidoptera
- Superfamily: Noctuoidea
- Family: Erebidae
- Genus: Hypenodes
- Species: H. sombrus

Binomial name
- Hypenodes sombrus Ferguson, 1954

= Hypenodes sombrus =

Species of moth

Hypenodes sombrus is a species of moth in the family Erebidae. It was first described by Douglas C. Ferguson in 1954. It is found in Canada from Nova Scotia to western Alberta. The habitat consists of bogs, cattail marshes, dry pine and other woodlands.
