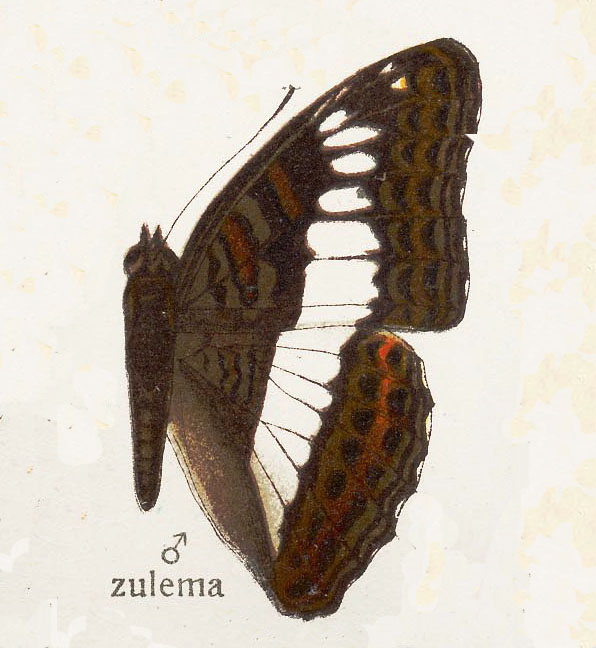
- Male

Scientific classification
- Kingdom: Animalia
- Phylum: Arthropoda
- Class: Insecta
- Order: Lepidoptera
- Family: Nymphalidae
- Genus: Sumalia
- Species: S. zulema

Binomial name
- Sumalia zulema (Doubleday, 1848)

= Sumalia zulema =

Species of butterfly

Sumalia zulema, the scarce white commodore, is a species of nymphalid butterfly found in tropical and subtropical Asia.
