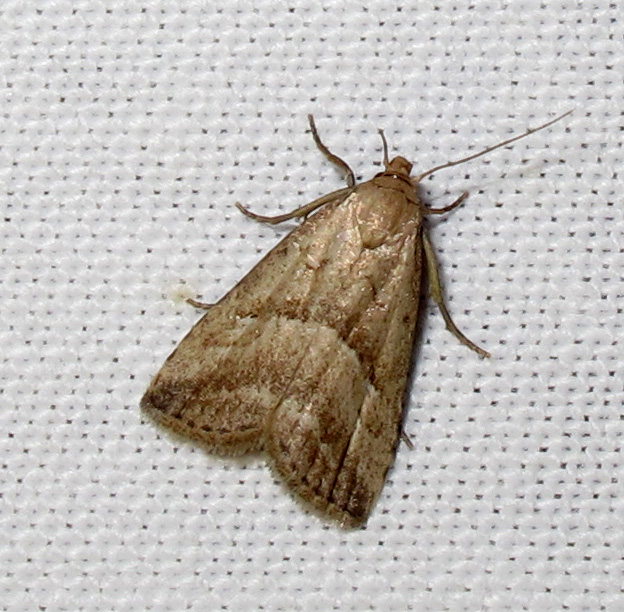

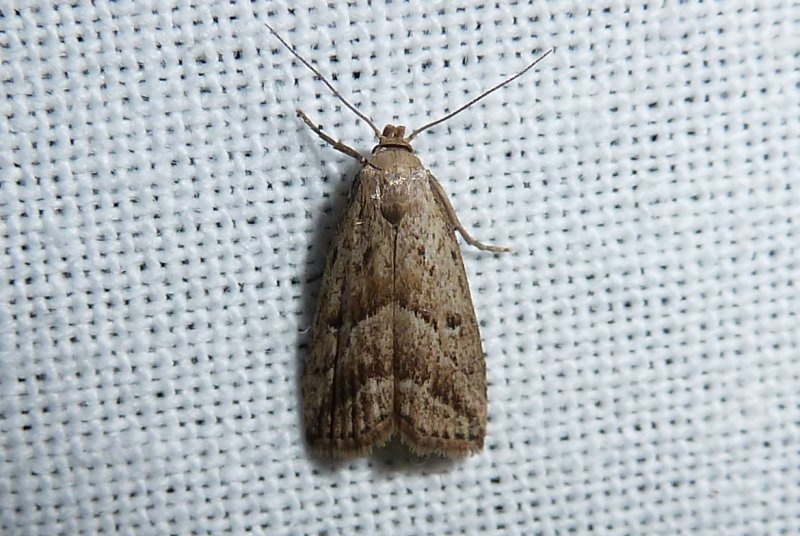

Scientific classification
- Kingdom: Animalia
- Phylum: Arthropoda
- Class: Insecta
- Order: Lepidoptera
- Superfamily: Noctuoidea
- Family: Erebidae
- Genus: Hypenodes
- Species: H. humidalis

Binomial name
- Hypenodes humidalis Doubleday, 1850

Synonyms
- Hypena turfosalis Wocke, 1850

= Hypenodes humidalis =

Species of moth

Hypenodes humidalis, the marsh oblique-barred, is a moth in the family Erebidae. The species was first described by Henry Doubleday in 1850. It is found in most of Europe and across the Palearctic to Siberia.

The wingspan is 14–15 mm. The forewing is whitish ochreous, irrorated (sprinkled) irregularly with brown and dark fuscous. The inner line is indistinct; the outer line is irregular, oblique, dark fuscous and posteriorly whitish edged. The cellspot is small, dark, outwardly whitish edged. The subterminal line is straight, whitish, ill-defined and preceded by fuscous suffusion, running to the apex. The hindwing is grey. Adults are on wing from the end of May to the beginning of October.

The larvae possibly feed on Juncus and/or Carex species. The larvae can be found from July to May. The species overwinters in the larval stage. Pupation takes place at the stem of the host plant.
