= List of butterflies of Nepal =

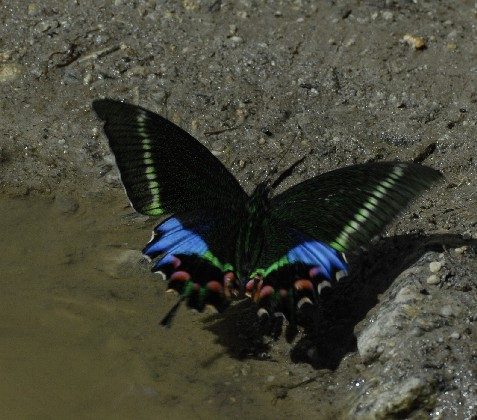
Papilio krishna has been proposed as the national butterfly of Nepal.

The following is a list of butterflies of Nepal. Six hundred and seventy-six species and thirty subspecies are listed.

This list is primarily based on Colin Smith's 2006 Illustrated Checklist of Nepal's Butterflies, with some recent additions and a modernized classification. Scientific and common names are also from that book (though corrections have been made when clear). The 27 endemic species or subspecies are marked.

== Family Hesperiidae - skippers ==
=== Subfamily Coeliadinae ===
- Badamia exclamationis - brown awl
- Bibasis sena - orange-tail awl
- Burara anadi anadi - plain orange awlet
- Burara oedipodea belesis - branded orange awlet
- Burara jaina jaina - orange awl
- Burara harisa harisa - orange awlet
- Burara vasutana - green awlet
- Burara amara - small green awlet
- Burara gomata - pale green awlet
- Hasora anura - slate awl
- Hasora chromus chromus - common banded awl
- Hasora badra badra - common awl
- Choaspes benjaminii japonica - Japanese awlking
- Choaspes xanthopogon - Indian awlking
- Choaspes furcata - hooked awlking

=== Subfamily Pyrginae ===
==== Tribe Calaenorrhini ====
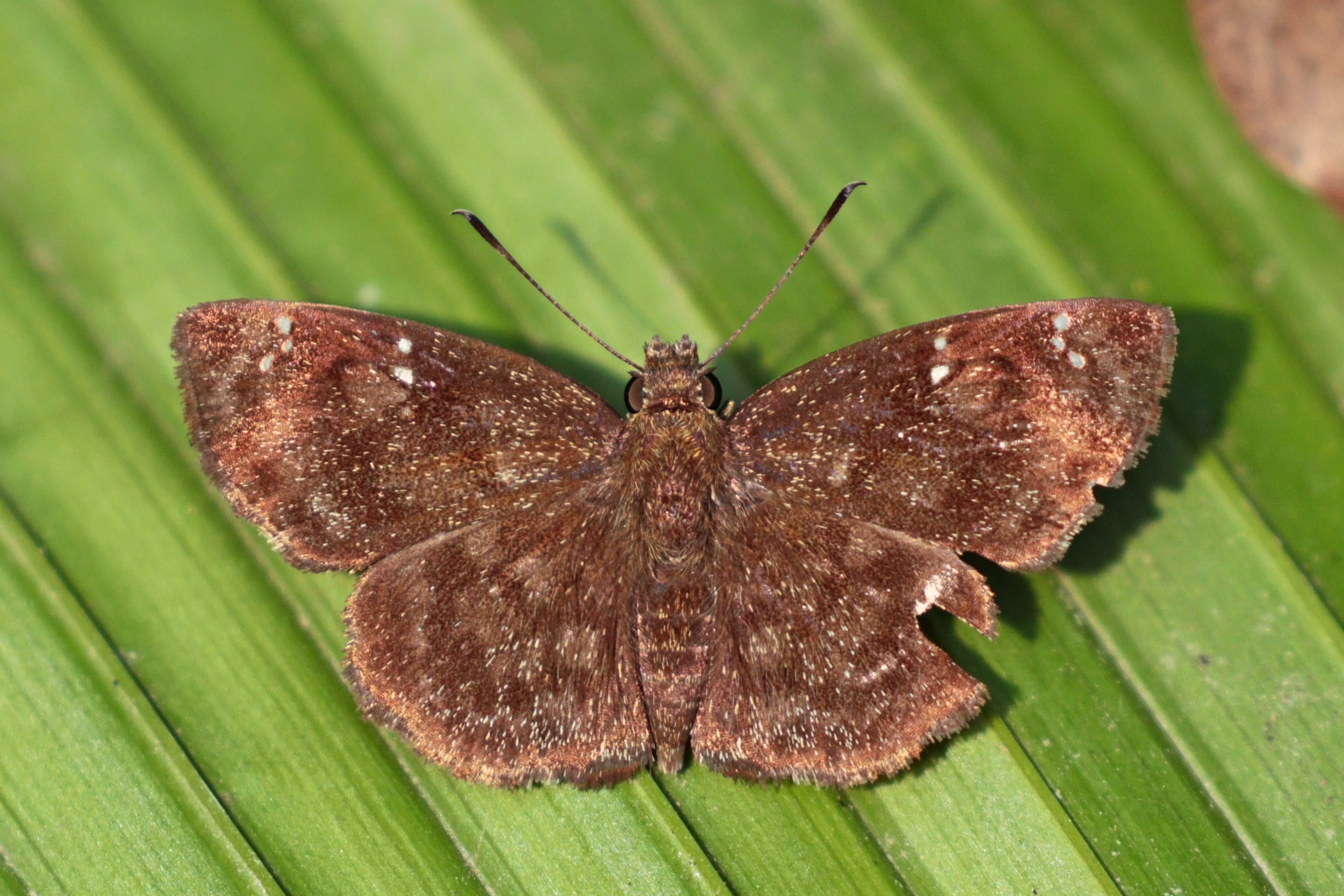
Common small flat Sarangesa dasahara dasahara

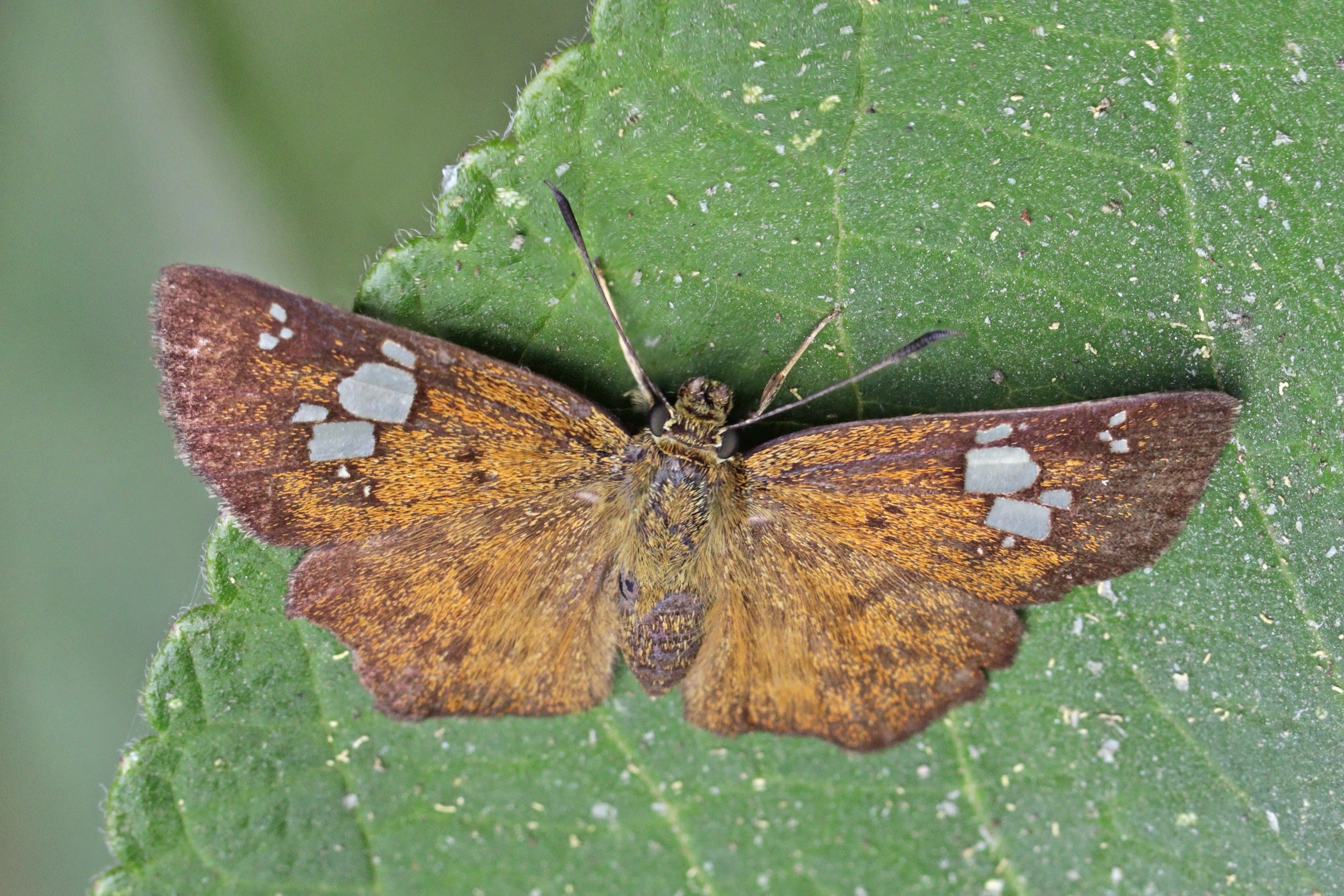
West Himalayan pied flat Pseudocoladenia fatih

- Capila lidderdali - Lidderdale's dawnfly
- Capila penicillatum - fringed dawnfly
- Capila jayadeva - striped dawnfly
- Lobocla liliana - marbled flat
- Celaenorrhinus ratna tytleri - Tytler's multispotted flat
- Celaenorrhinus pero lucifera - Mussoorie spotted flat
- Celaenorrhinus patula - large spotted flat
- Celaenorrhinus leucocera - common spotted flat
- Celaenorrhinus putra putra - Bengal spotted flat
- Celaenorrhinus munda - Himalayan spotted flat
- Celaenorrhinus maculicornis - Elwes' spotted flat
- Celaenorrhinus dhanada dhanada - Himalayan yellow-banded flat
- Celaenorrhinus nigricans nigricans - Himalayan small-banded flat
- Dharpa hanria - hairy angle
- Pseudocoladenia fatih - west Himalayan pied flat
- Coladenia indrani indrani - tricolour pied flat
- Coladenia agnioides - Elwes' pied flat
- Sarangesa purendra purendra - spotted small flat
- Sarangesa dasahara dasahara - common small flat
- Satarupa zulla zulla - Tytler's white flat
- Satarupa gopala - large white flat
- Seseria dohertyi dohertyi - Himalayan white flat
- Chamunda chamunda - olive flat
- Gerosis phisara phisara - dusky yellow-breasted flat
- Gerosis bhagava bhagava - common yellow-breasted flat
- Tagiades japetus ravi - common snow flat
- Tagiades gana athos - suffused snow flat
- Tagiades parra gala - large snow flat
- Tagiades litigiosa litigiosa - water snow flat
- Tagiades menaka menaka - spotted snow flat
- Tagiades cohaerens cyntyia - Evans' snow flat
- Mooreana trichoneura pralaya - yellow flat
- Ctenoptilum vasava vasava - tawny angle
- Odontoptilum angulata angulata - chestnut angle
- Caprona agama agama - spotted angle
- Caprona alida yerburi - Yerbury's golden angle

==== Tribe Pyrgini ====
- Spialia galba - Indian skipper
- Pyrgus nepalensis - Nepal skipper (endemic)

=== Subfamily Hesperiinae ===
==== Tribe Heteropterini ====
- Carterocephalus avanti avanti - orange and silver mountain hopper

==== Tribe Astictopterini ====
- Astictopterus jama olivascens - forest hopper
- Arnetta atkinsoni - Atkinson's bob
- Ochus subvittatus subradiatus - tiger hopper
- Baracus vittatus septentrionym - hedge hopper
- Ampittia dioscorides - bush hopper
- Aeromachus kali - blue-spotted scrub hopper
- Aeromachus stigmata stigmata - veined scrub hopper
- Aeromachus jhora jhora - grey scrub hopper
- Aeromachus dubius dubius - dingy scrub hopper
- Aeromachus pygmaeus - pygmy scrub hopper
- Pedesta masuriensis masuriensis - Mussoorie bush bob
- Pedesta pandita - brown bush bob
- Sebastronyma dolopia - tufted ace
- Sovia grahami - Graham's ace
- Sovia lucasii separata - Lucas' ace
- Thoressa gupta gupta - olive ace
- Thoressa aina aina - Garwal ace
- Halpe arcuata - overlapped ace
- Halpe zema zema - banded ace
- Halpe kumara - plain ace
- Halpe porus - Moore's ace
- Halpe homolea molta - Indian ace
- Halpe filda - Elwes' ace
- Pithauria stramineipennis - light straw ace
- Pithauria murdava - dark straw ace

==== Tribe Ancistroidini ====
- Iambrix salsala salsala - chestnut bob
- Koruthaialos rubecula cachara - narrow banded velvet bob
- Koruthaialos butleri - dark velvet bob
- Ancistroides nigrita diocles - chocolate demon
- Notocrypta curvifascia curvifascia - restricted demon
- Notocrypta feisthamelii alysos - spotted demon
- Udaspes folus - grass demon

==== Tribe Plastingiini ====
- Scobura cephala - forest bob
- Suada swerga swerga - grass bob
- Suastus gremius gremius - Indian palm bob
- Cupitha purreea - wax dart
- Zographetus satwa - purple and gold flitter
- Zographetus ogygia - purple-spotted flitter
- Hyarotis adrastus praba - tree flitter
- Gangara thyrsis - giant red-eye
- Erionota torus - Sikkim palm red-eye
- Erionota thrax thrax - common palm red-eye
- Matapa aria - common red-eye
- Matapa druna - grey-brand red-eye
- Matapa sasivarna - black-veined red-eye
- Matapa cresta - fringed red-eye
- Matapa purpurascens - purple red-eye

==== Tribe Hesperiini ====
- Ochlodes brahma - Himalayan darter

==== Tribe Taractrocerini ====
- Taractrocera danna - Himalayan grass dart
- Taractrocera maevius sagra - common grass dart
- Oriens goloides - Ceylon dartlet
- Oriens gola pseudolus - common dartlet
- Potanthus pallida - pale dart
- Potanthus trachala - broad bident dart
- Potanthus pseudomaesa clio - Indian dart
- Potanthus dara - Himalayan dart
- Potanthus confucius dushta - Chinese dart
- Potanthus mara - branded Sikkim dart
- Potanthus nesta nesta - Sikkim dart
- Potanthus pava - Formosan dart
- Potanthus palnia palnia - Palni dart
- Telicota colon colon - pale palm dart
- Telicota bambusae bambusae - dark palm dart
- Telicota ohara jix - Plotz's palm dart
- Cephrenes chrysozona oceanica - plain palm dart

==== Tribe Gegenini ====
- Parnara guttata mangala - straight swift
- Parnara apostata debdasi - Sumatran swift
- Parnara bada bada - Ceylon swift
- Borbo cinnara cinnara - rice swift
- Borbo bevani - Bevan's swift
- Pelopidas sinensis - large branded swift
- Pelopidas agna agna - little branded swift
- Pelopidas mathias mathias - small branded swift
- Pelopidas assamensis - great swift
- Pelopidas conjuncta javana - conjoined swift
- Polytremis lubricans lubricans - contiguous swift
- Polytremis discreta discreta - Himalayan swift
- Polytremis eltola eltola - yellow-spot swift
- Baoris farri farri - paintbrush swift
- Baoris penicillata unicolor - pencil swift
- Baoris pagana - figure-of-eight swift
- Caltoris sirius sirius - Sirius swift
- Caltoris cahira austeni - colon swift
- Caltoris kumara moorei - blank swift
- Caltoris tulsi tulsi - purple swift
- Caltoris plebeia - tufted swift

== Family Papilionidae - swallowtails ==
=== Subfamily Parnassiinae ===
- Parnassius epaphus epaphus - common red Apollo
  - Parnassius epaphus epaphus
  - Parnassius epaphus sikkimensis
  - Parnassius epaphus chiddii
  - Parnassius epaphus robertsi
  - Parnassius epaphus capdevillei
  - Parnassius epaphus boschmai
- Parnassius hardwickii - common blue Apollo (endemic)
- Parnassius stoliczkanus - Ladakh banded Apollo/many eyed Apollo
- Parnassius stenosemus nobuko - Pir Panjal banded Apollo
- Parnassius acdestis - banded Apollo
  - Parnassius acdestis katsuhikoi
  - Parnassius acdestis laurentii
  - Parnassius acdestis marki
  - Parnassius acdestis whitei
- Parnassius cephalus horii - dusky Apollo
- Parnassius simo - black-edged Apollo
  - Parnassius simo acconus
  - Parnassius simo simo
- Parnassius acco acco - varnished Apollo

=== Subfamily Papilioninae ===
==== Tribe Leptocircini ====
- Teinopalpus imperialis imperialis - Kaiser-i-Hind
- Meandrusa gyas gyas - brown gorgon
- Pathysa eurous sikkimica - six-bar swordtail
- Pathysa glycerion - spectacle swordtail (endemic)
- Pathysa antiphates pompilius - five-bar swordtail
- Pathysa nomius nomius - spot swordtail
- Graphium cloanthus cloanthus - glassy bluebottle
- Graphium sarpedon luctatius - common bluebottle
- Graphium agamemnon agamemnon - tailed jay
- Graphium doson axion - common jay
- Graphium clanis chironicum - veined jay
- Graphium xenocles phrontis - great zebra
- Graphium macareus indicus - lesser zebra

==== Tribe Papilionini ====
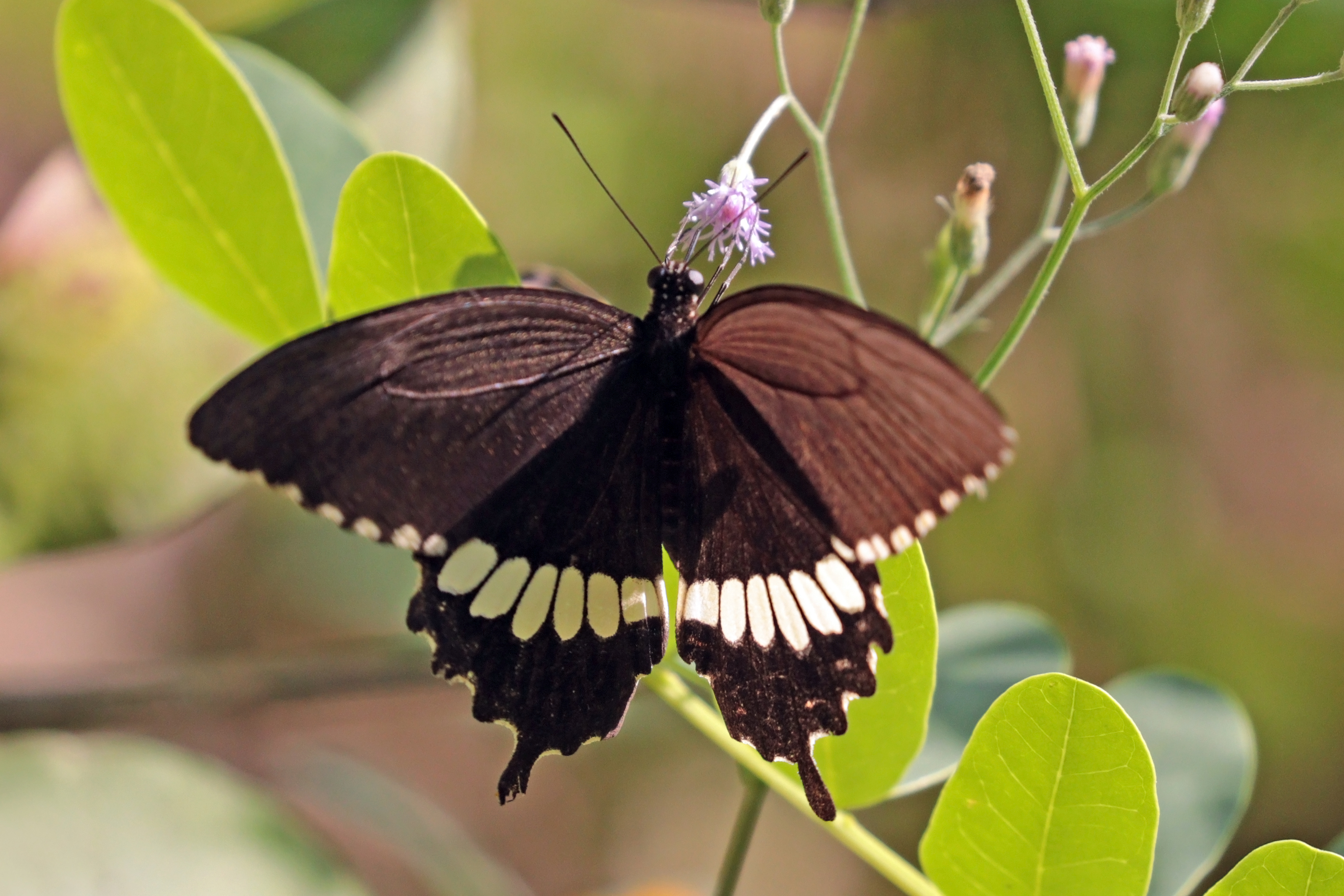
Common Mormon Papilio polytes male f. romulus

- Chilasa agestor - tawny mime
  - Chilasa agestor agestor (endemic)
  - Chilasa agestor govindra (endemic)
- Chilasa epycides epycides - lesser mime
- Chilasa clytia clytia - common mime
- Papilio machaon - common yellow swallowtail
  - Papilio machaon rinpoche
  - Papilio machaon emihippocrates
- Papilio demoleus demoleus - lime swallowtail
- Papilio paris decorosa - Paris peacock
- Papilio polyctor ganesa - common peacock
- Papilio arcturus arcturus - blue peacock
- Papilio krishna - Krishna peacock
- Papilio memnon agenor - great Mormon
- Papilio polymnestor - blue Mormon
- Papilio protenor euprotenor - spangle
- Papilio alcmenor - common redbreast
- Papilio janaka - tailed redbreast
- Papilio polytes romolus - common Mormon
- Papilio helenus helenus - red Helen
- Papilio nephelus chaon - yellow Helen
- Papilio castor polias - common raven

==== Tribe Troidini ====
- Pachliopta aristolochiae aristolochiae - common rose
- Atrophaneura latreillei latreillei - rose windmill (endemic)
- Atrophaneura polyeuctes letincius - common windmill
- Atrophaneura dasarada dasarada - great windmill
- Atrophaneura dasarada ravana
- Atrophaneura alcinous pembertoni - Chinese windmill
- Atrophaneura aidoneus - lesser batwing
- Atrophaneura varuna astorion - common batwing
- Troides helena cerberus - common birdwing
- Troides aeacus aeacus - golden birdwing

== Family Pieridae - whites ==
=== Tribe Pierini ===
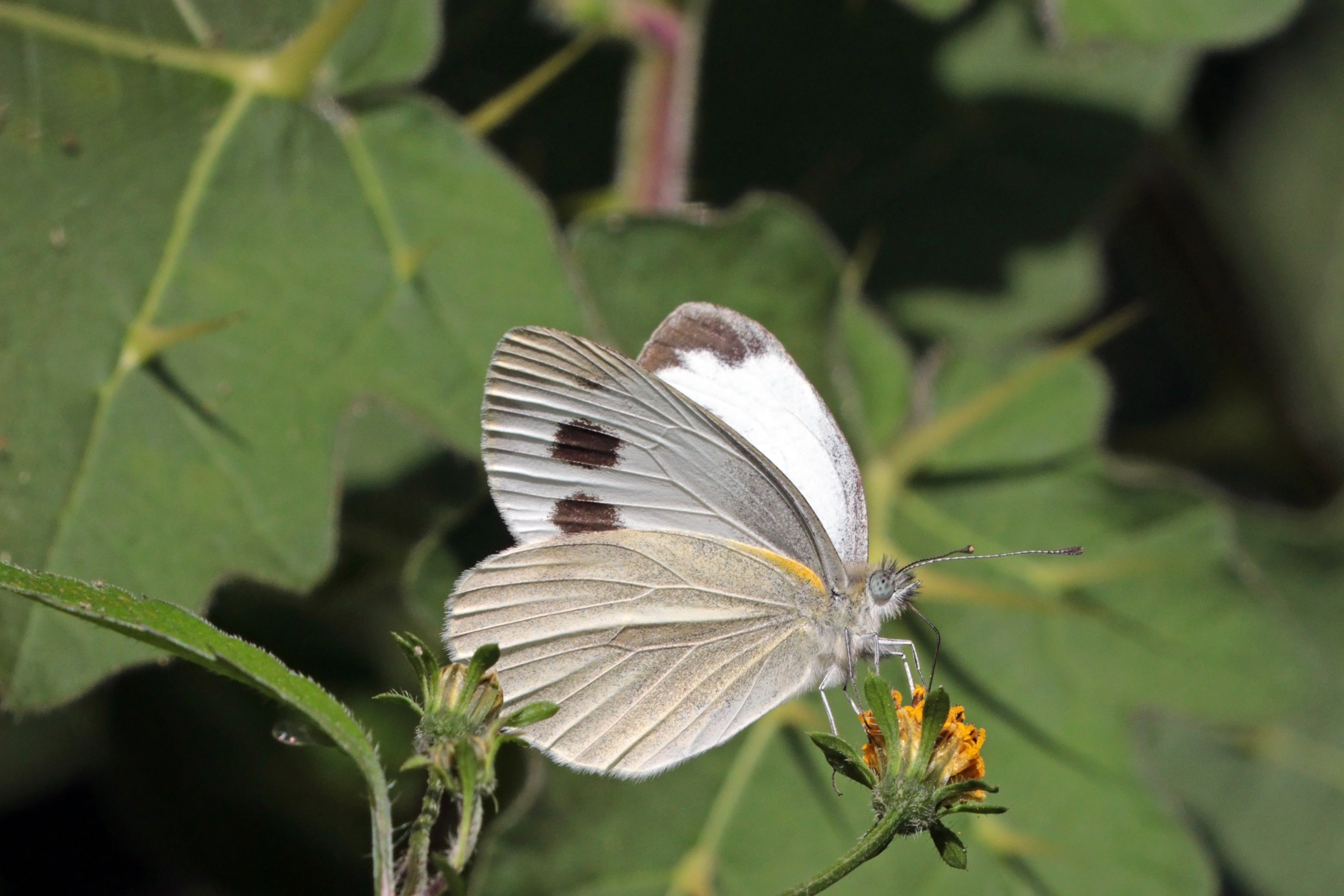
Indian cabbage white Pieris canidia indica female

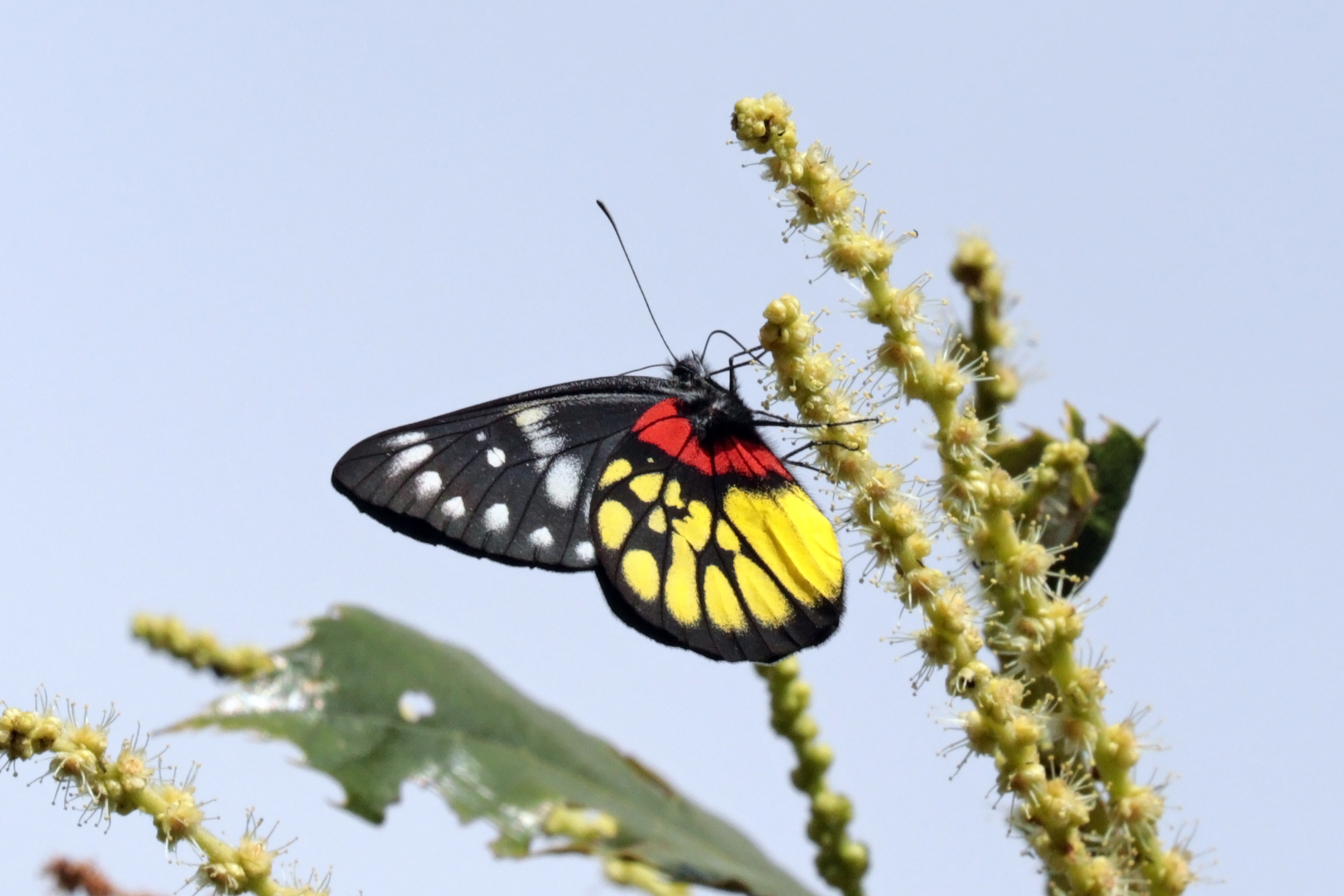
Red base Jezebel Delias pasithoe thyra

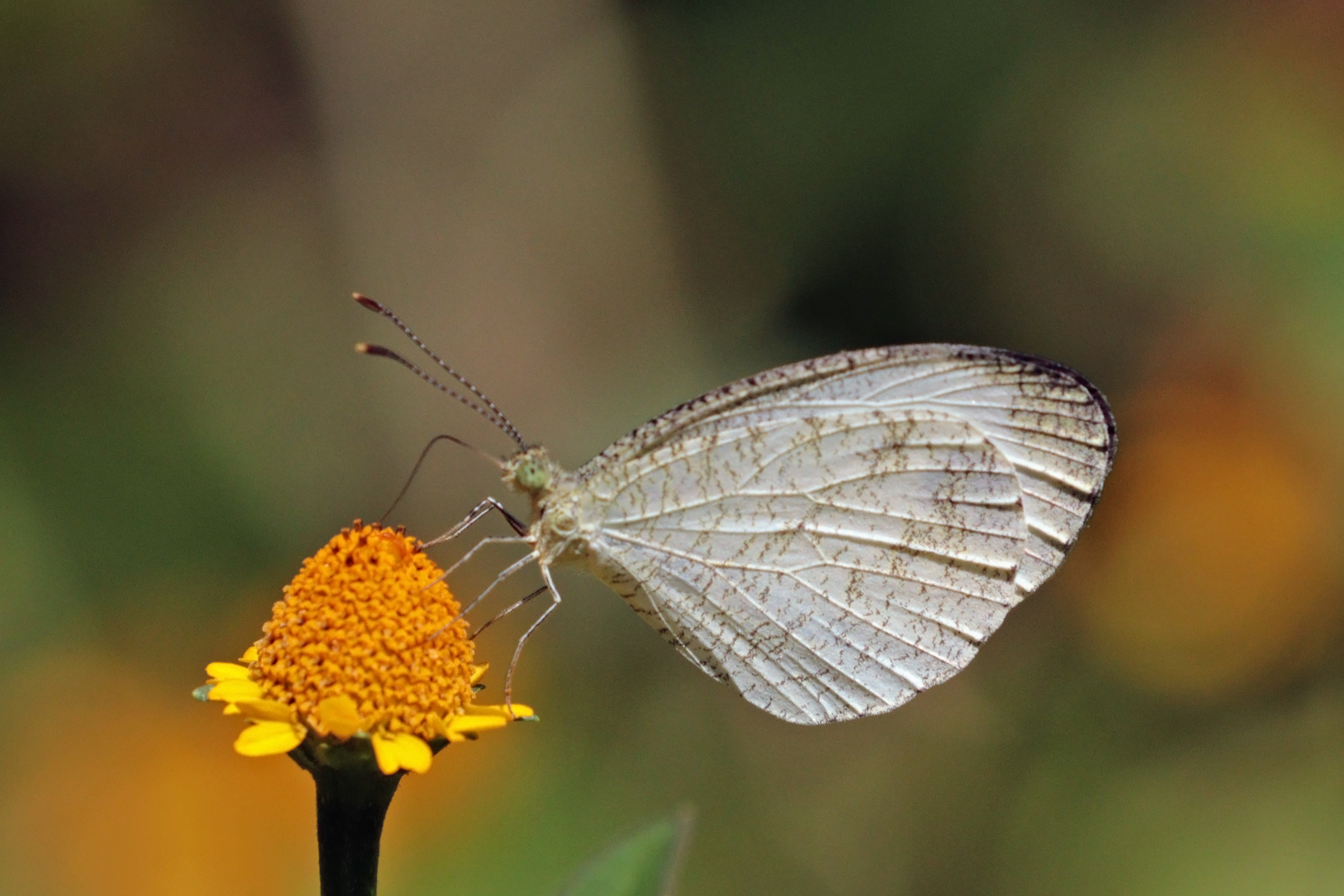
Psyche Leptosia nina nina

- Metaporia agathon agathon - great blackvein
  - Metaporia agathon agathon (endemic)
  - Metaporia agathon caphusa (endemic)
  - Metaporia agathon phryxe (endemic)
- Metaporia leucodice - Himalayan blackvein
- Mesapia peloria - Tibetan blackvein
- Baltia butleri butleri - Butler's dwarf
- Pieris brassicae nepalensis - large cabbage white
- Pieris canidia indica - Indian cabbage white
- Pieris montanus - green-veined white
- Synchloe callidice - lofty Bath white
- Synchloe sherpae - Sherpa white (endemic)
- Pontia daplidice moorei - Bath white
- Belenois aurota aurota - pioneer
- Cepora nadina - lesser gull
- Cepora nerissa phryne - common gull
- Delias belladonna - hill Jezebel
  - Delias belladonna horsfieldi
  - Delias belladonna lugens
- Delias sanaca oreas - pale Jezebel
- Delias berinda boyleae - dark Jezebel
- Delias pasithoe thyra - red-base Jezebel
- Delias acalis pyramus - read-breast Jezebel
- Delias descombesi leucacantha - red-spot Jezebel
- Delias agostina agostina - yellow Jezebel
- Delias hyparete indica - painted Jezebel
- Delias eucharis - common Jezebel
- Appias libythea olferna - striped albatross
- Appias lyncida eleonora - chocolate albatross
- Appias albina darada - common albatross
- Appias indra indra - plain puffin
- Appias lalage lalage - spot puffin
- Leptosia nina nina - Psyche
- Prioneris thestylis thestylis - spotted sawtooth

=== Tribe Euchloeini ===
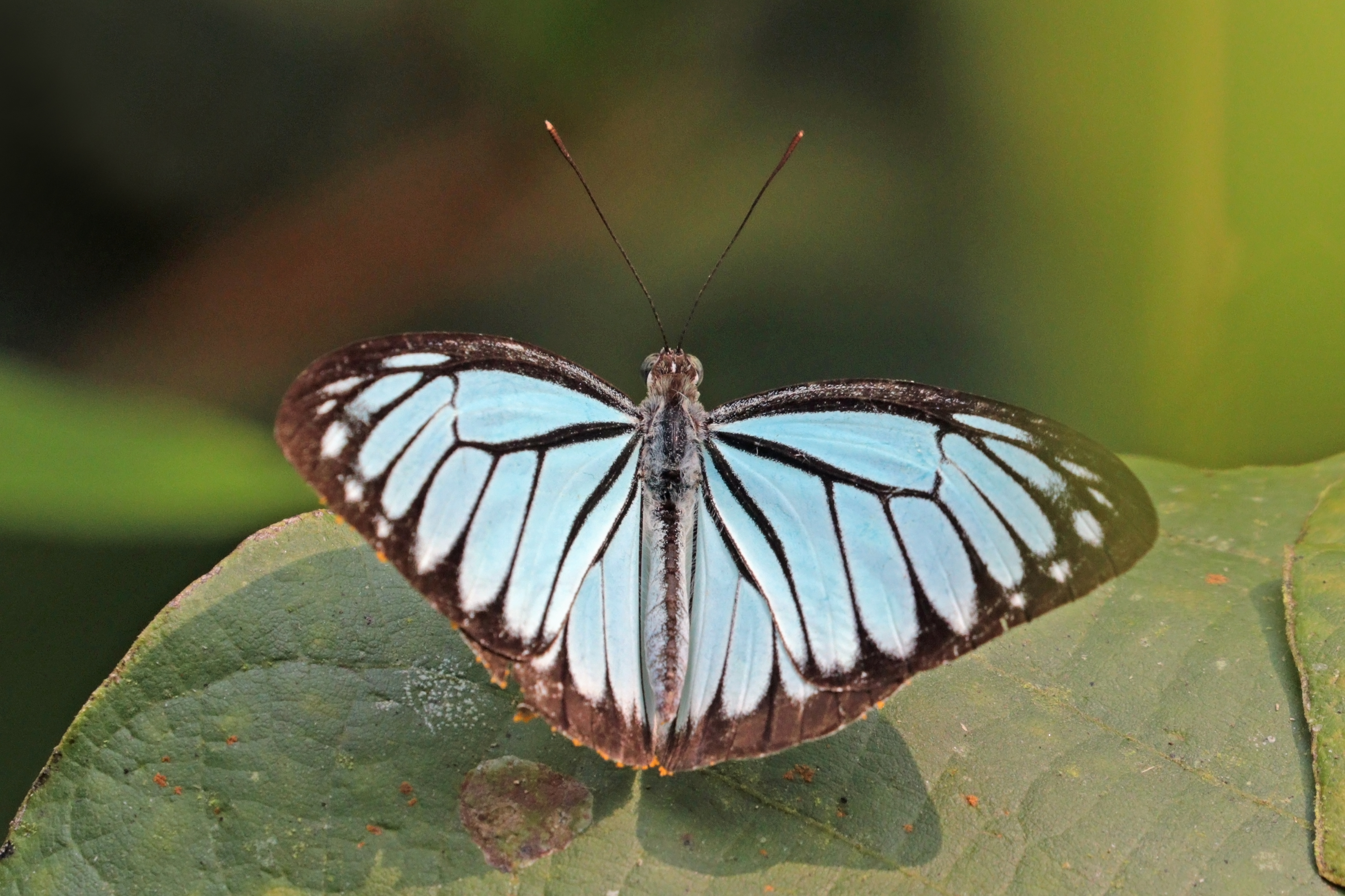
Common wanderer Pareronia hippia male

- Ixias marianne - white orange tip
- Ixias pyrene familiaris - yellow orange tip
- Hebomoia glaucippe glaucippe - great orange tip
- Pareronia valeria hippia - common wanderer
- Pareronia avatar avatar - pale wanderer

=== Tribe Coliadini ===
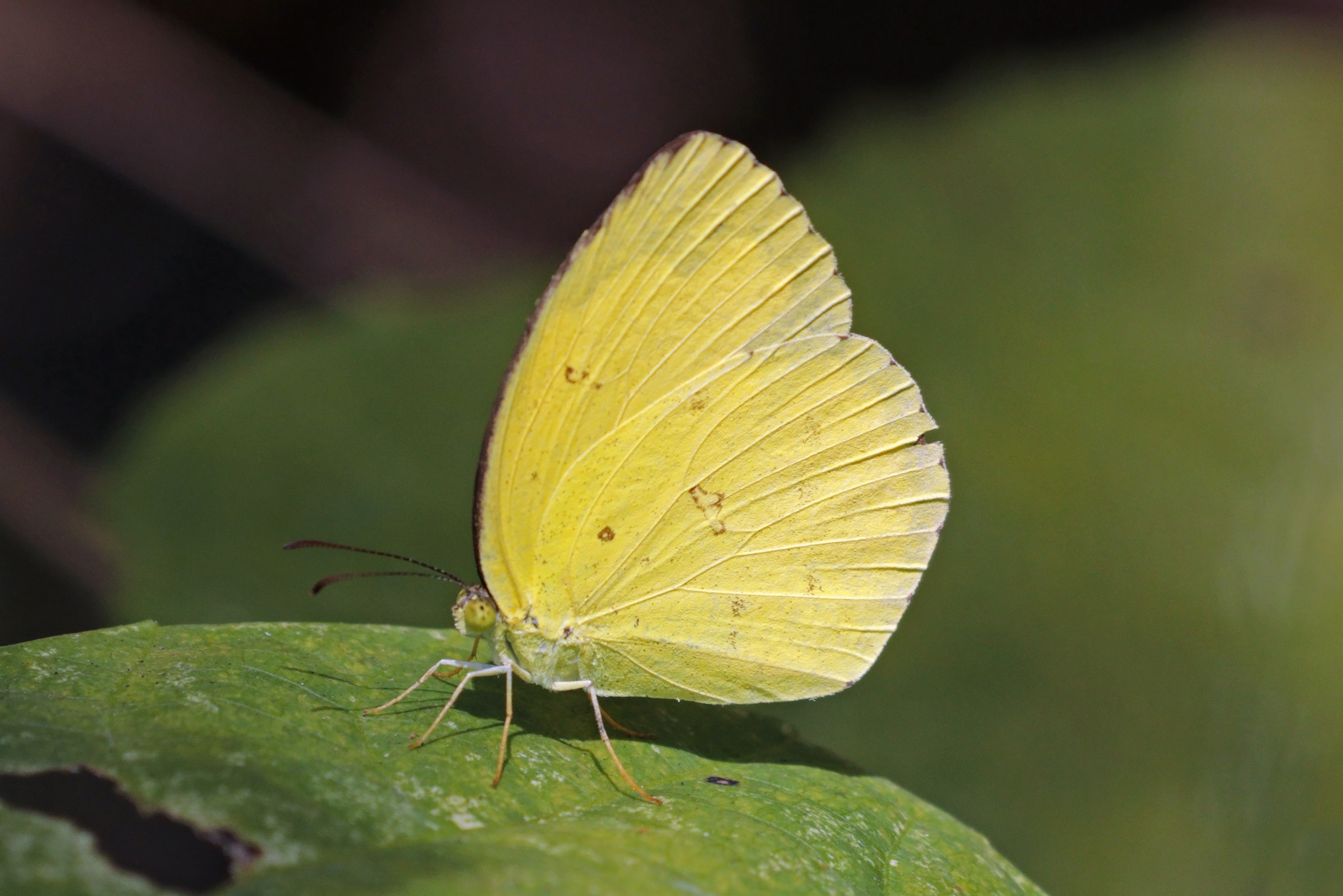
Common grass yellow Eurema hecabe contubernalis with no cell spots on forewing

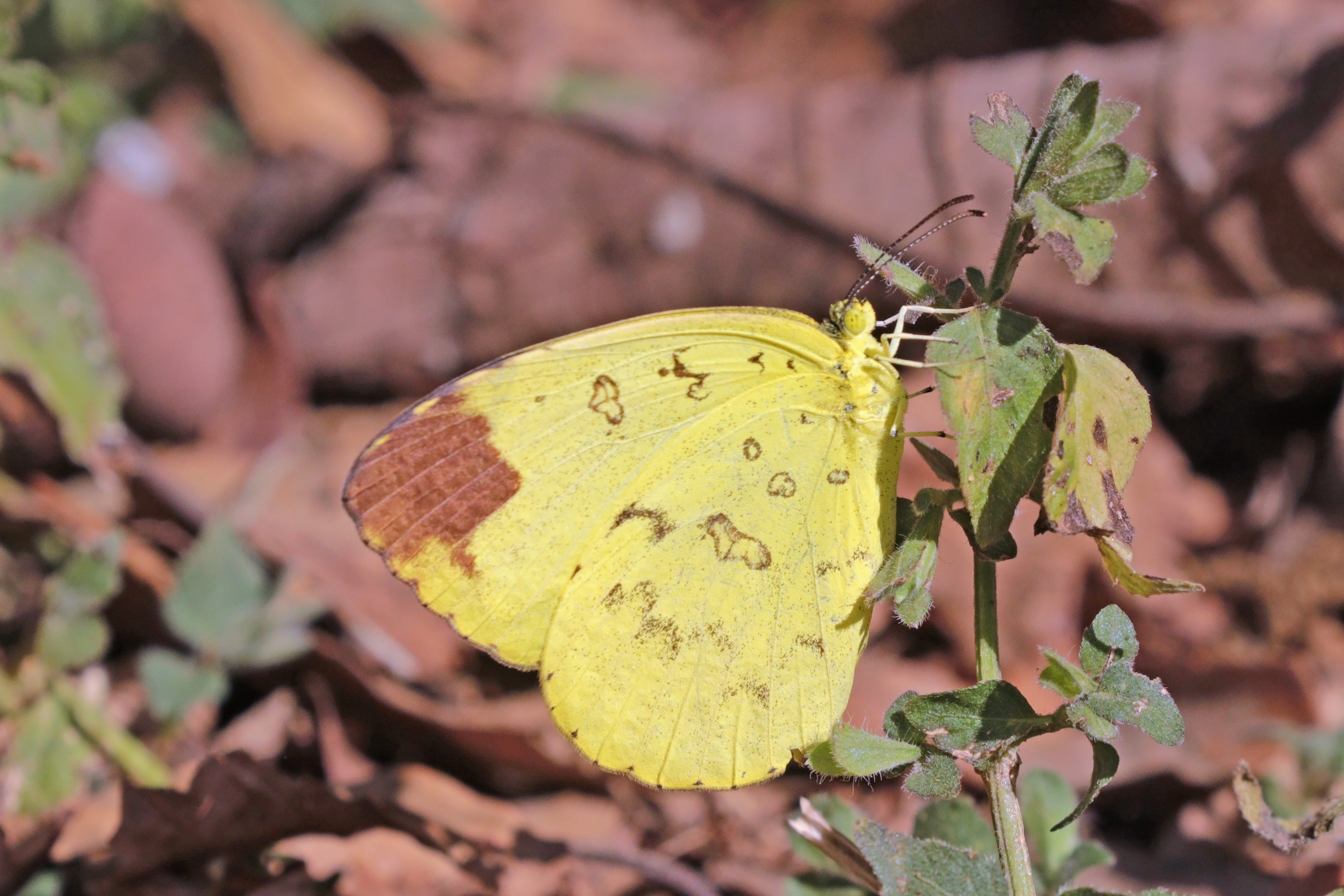
Three-spot grass yellow Eurema blanda silhetana

- Catopsilia pomona pomona - lemon emigrant or common emigrant
- Catopsilia pyranthe pyranthe - mottled emigrant
- Gonepteryx rhamni napalensis - common brimstone
- Gonepteryx aspasia zaneka - lesser brimstone
- Dercas verhuelli doubledayi - tailed sulpher
- Gandaca harina assamica - tree yellow
- Eurema andersonii jordani - one-spot grass yellow
- Eurema brigitta rubella - small grass yellow
- Eurema laeta sikkima - spotless grass yellow
- Eurema blanda silhetana - three-spot grass yellow
- Eurema hecabe contubernalis - common grass yellow
- Colias tibetana - Tibetan clouded yellow
- Colias ladakensis - Ladakh clouded yellow
- Colias berylla - Everest clouded yellow
- Colias erate lativitta - pale clouded yellow
- Colias stoliczkana - orange clouded yellow
  - Colias stoliczkana miranda
  - Colias stoliczkana cathleenae
- Colias fieldii fieldii - dark clouded yellow

== Family Lycaenidae - blues ==
=== Subfamily Poritiinae ===
- Poritia hewitsoni hewitsoni - common gem

=== Subfamily Miletinae ===
==== Tribe Miletini ====
- Miletus chinensis assamensis - common brownie
- Allotinus drumila drumila - great darkie
- Logania distanti massalia - dark mottle

==== Tribe Spalgini ====
- Spalgis epeus epeus - apefly

==== Tribe Tarakini ====
- Taraka hamada mendesia - forest Pierrot

==== Tribe Liphyrini ====
- Liphyra brassolis brassolis - moth butterfly

=== Subfamily Curetinae ===
- Curetis bulis bulis - bright sunbeam
- Curetis acuta dentata - angled sunbeam

=== Subfamily Aphnaeinae ===
- Cigaritis vulcanus vulcanus - common silverline
- Cigaritis schistacea gabriel - plumbous silverline
- Cigaritis elima uniformis - scarce shot silverline
- Cigaritis nipalicus nipalicus - silver-grey silverline (endemic)
- Cigaritis lohita himalayanus - long-banded silverline
- Cigaritis syama peguanus - club silverline

=== Subfamily Theclinae ===
==== Tribe Theclini ====
- Ahlbergia haradai - prickly ash elfin (endemic)
- Euaspa milionia - water hairstreak
- Esakiozephyrus icana - dull green hairstreak
- Esakiozephyrus mandara dohertyi - Indian purple hairstreak
- Chrysozephyrus sikkimensis - Sikkim green hairstreak
- Chrysozephyrus zoa - powdered green hairstreak
- Chrysozephyrus duma - metallic green hairstreak
- Chrysozephyrus disparatus interpositas - Sikkim hairstreak
- Chrysozephyrus birupa - fawn hairstreak
- Chrysozephyrus bhutanensis - Bhutan silver hairstreak
- Chrysozephyrus syla - silver hairstreak
- Chrysozephyrus assamicus - Assam silver hairstreak
- Chrysozephyrus kirbariensis shakuhuge - Kirbari hairstreak
- Chrysozephyrus paona - Paona hairstreak
- Chrysozephyrus ataxus ataxus - wonderful hairstreak
- Neozephyrus suroia yukie - caerulean hairstreak
- Chaetoprocta odata - walnut blue
  - Chaetoprocta odata baileyi
  - Chaetoprocta odata kurumi

==== Tribe Arhopalini ====
- Amblopala avidiena nepalica - Chinese hairstreak
- Mahathala ameria ameria - falcate oakblue
- Arhopala oenea - Hewitson's dull oakblue
- Arhopala khamti - Doherty's dull oakblue
- Arhopala atrax - Indian oakblue
- Arhopala bazaloides - Tamil oakblue
- Arhopala birmana birmana - Burmese bushblue
- Arhopala amantes apella - large oakblue
- Arhopala pseudocentaurus pirithous - centaur oakblue
- Arhopala bazalus teesta - powdered oakblue
- Arhopala singla - yellow-disc oakblue
- Arhopala eumolphus - green oakblue
- Arhopala paramuta paramuta - hooked oakblue
- Arhopala rama rama - dark Himalayan oakblue
- Arhopala dodonaea - pale Himalayan oakblue
- Arhopala perimuta - yellow-disk tailless oakblue
- Arhopala fulla ignara - spotless oakblue
- Arhopala abseus indicus - aberrant oakblue
- Panchala ganesa ganesa - tailless bushblue
- Panchala paraganesa paraganesa - dusky bushblue
- Flos fulgida fulgida - shining plushblue
- Flos adriana - variegated plushblue
- Flos asoka - spangled plushblue
- Flos chinensis - Chinese plushblue
- Flos areste - tailless plushblue
- Surendra quercetorum quercetorum - common acacia blue
- Zinaspa todara distorta - silver-streaked acacia blue

==== Tribe Zesiini ====
- Zesius chrysomallus - redspot

==== Tribe Amblypodiini ====
- Iraota timoleon timoleon - silverstreak blue

==== Tribe Catapaecilmatini ====
- Catapaecilma major major - common tinsel

==== Tribe Horagini ====
- Horaga onyx onyx - common onyx
- Horaga albimacula viola - brown onyx

==== Tribe Loxurini ====
- Loxura atymnus continentalis - yamfly

==== Tribe Cheritrini ====
- Cheritra freja evansi - common imperial
- Cheritrella truncipennis - truncate imperial
- Ticherra acte acte - blue imperial

==== Tribe Iolaini ====
- Tajuria yajna istroides - chestnut royal
- Tajuria diaeus - straightline royal
- Tajuria cippus cippus - peacock royal
- Tajuria illurgis - white royal
- Tajuria illurgoides - scarce white royal
- Tajuria luculentus nela - Chinese royal
- Tajuria maculata - spotted royal
- Dacalana cotys - white banded royal
- Pratapa deva lila - white tufted royal
- Pratapa icetas icetas - dark blue royal
- Creon cleobis cleobis - broadtail royal
- Maneca bhotea - slate royal
- Charana mandarinus mandarinus - mandarin blue
- Rachana jalindra indra - banded royal
- Neocheritra fabronia fabronia - pale grand imperial

==== Tribe Remelaini ====
- Remelana jangala ravata - chocolate royal
- Ancema ctesia ctesia - bispot royal
- Ancema blanka minturna - silver royal

==== Tribe Hypolycaenini ====
- Hypolycaena erylus himavantus - common tit
- Zeltus amasa amasa - fluffy tit
- Chliaria othona - orchid tit
- Chliaria kina - blue tit

==== Tribe Deudorigini ====
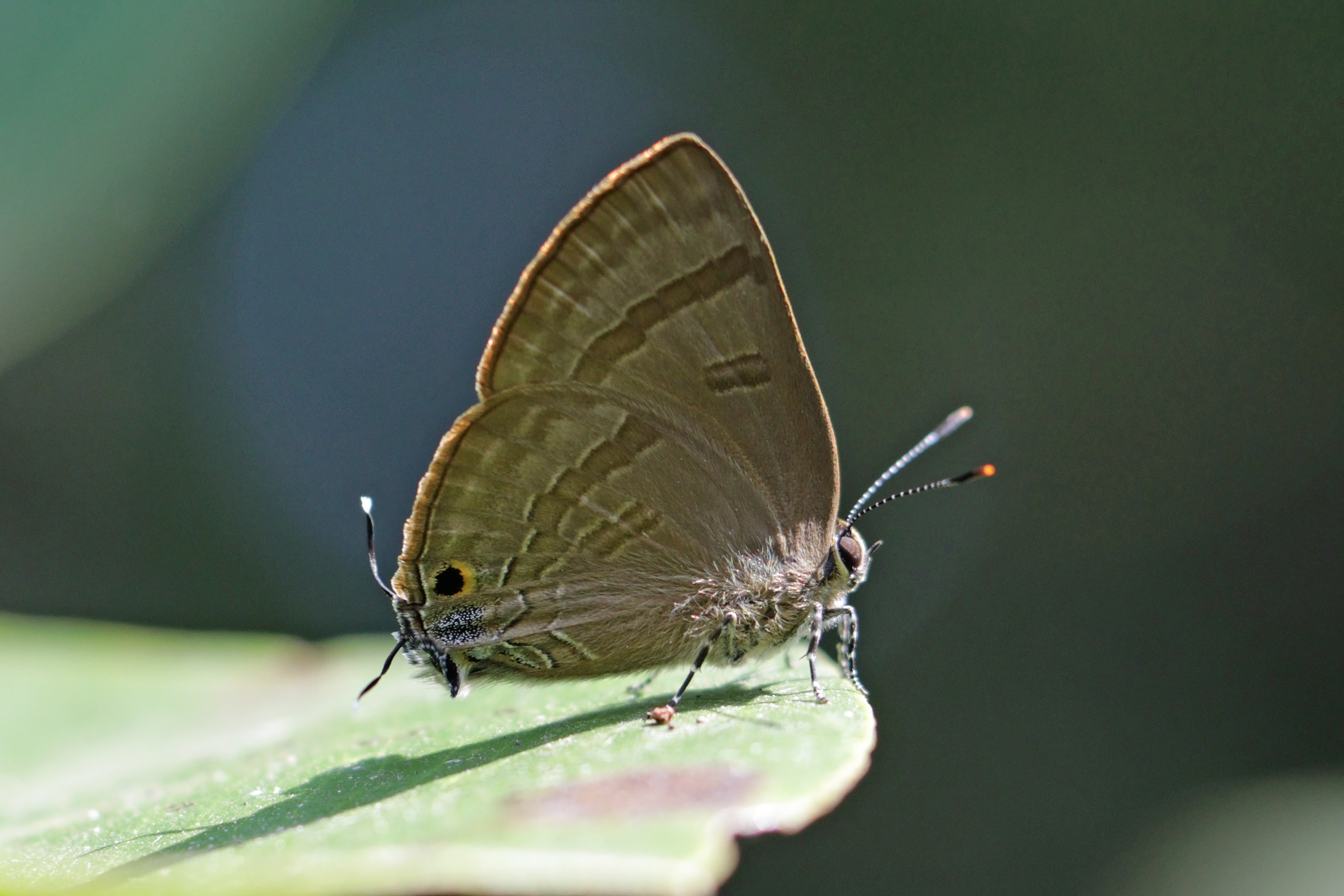
Indigo flash Rapala varuna orseis

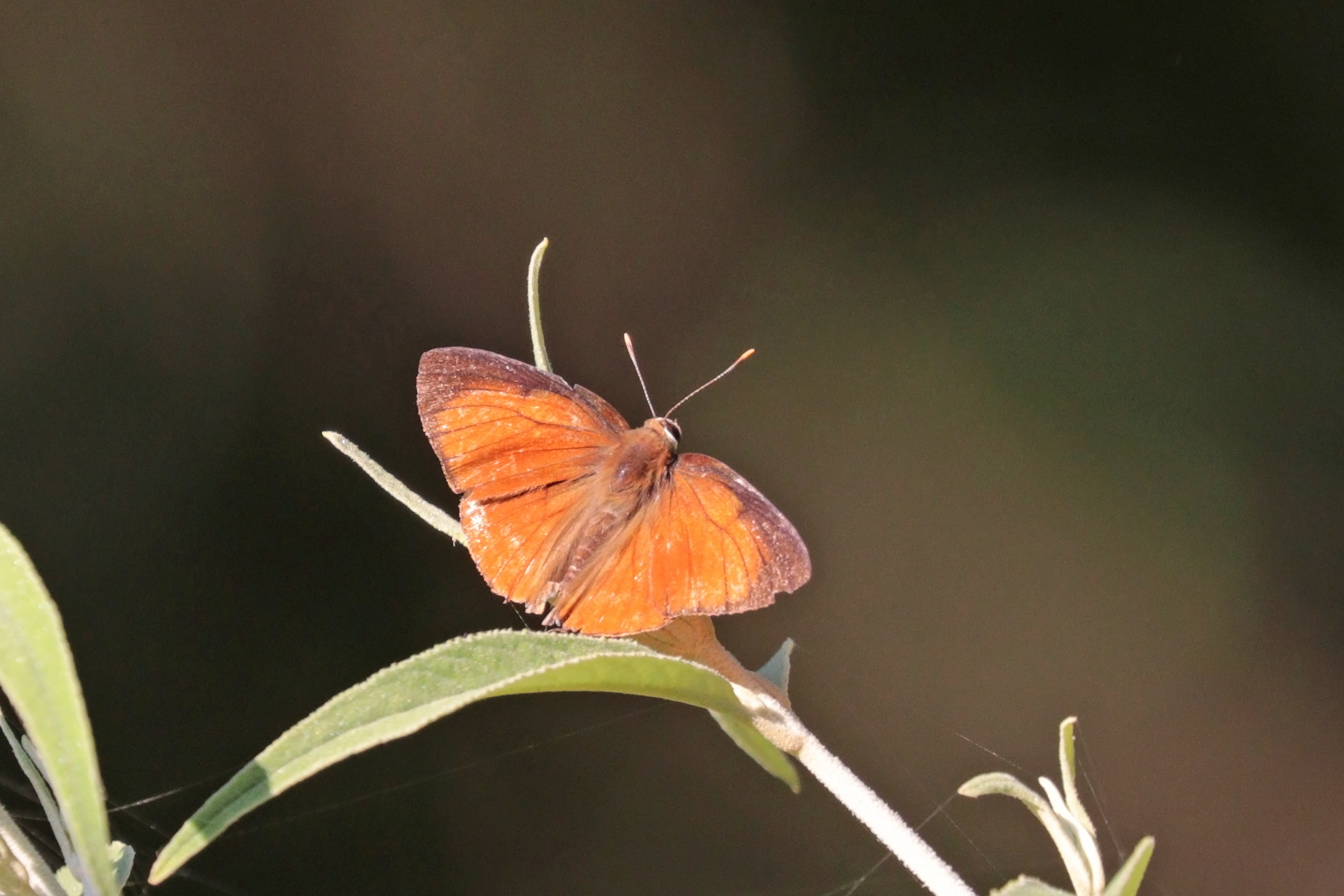
Copper flash Rapala pheritima petosiris

- Artipe eryx - green flash
- Virachola isocrates - common guava blue
- Virachola perse perse - large guava blue
- Deudorix epijarbas ancus - cornelian
- Rapala refulgens - refulgent flash
- Rapala damona - Malay red flash
- Rapala tara - Assam flash
- Rapala varuna orseis - indigo flash
- Rapala manea schistacea - slate flash
- Rapala scintilla - scarce slate flash
- Rapala pheretima petosiris - copper flash
- Rapala dieneces dieneces - scarlet flash
- Rapala iarbus - common red flash
- Rapala rectivitta - shot flash
- Rapala nissa nissa - common flash
- Rapala micans selira - Himalayan red flash
- Sinthusa nasaka pallidior - narrow spark
- Sinthusa chandrana - broad spark
- Pamela dudgeoni - Lister's hairstreak

=== Subfamily Lycaeninae ===
- Lycaena pavana - white-bordered copper
- Lycaena phlaeas baralacha - common copper
- Heliophorus sena - sorrel sapphire
- Heliophorus epicles latilimbata - purple sapphire
- Heliophorus indicus - Indian purple sapphire
- Heliophorus ila pseudonexus - restricted purple sapphire
- Heliophorus moorei - azure sapphire
- Heliophorus bakeri - western blue sapphire
- Heliophorus oda - eastern blue sapphire
- Heliophorus brahma brahma - golden sapphire
- Heliophorus androcles coruscans - green sapphire
- Heliophorus tamu tamu - powdery green sapphire

=== Subfamily Polyommatinae ===
==== Tribe Lycaenesthini ====
- Anthene emolus emolus - ciliate blue
- Anthene lycaenina lycambes - pointed ciliate blue

==== Tribe Niphandini ====
- Niphanda cymbia cymbia - pointed Pierrot

==== Tribe Polyommatini ====
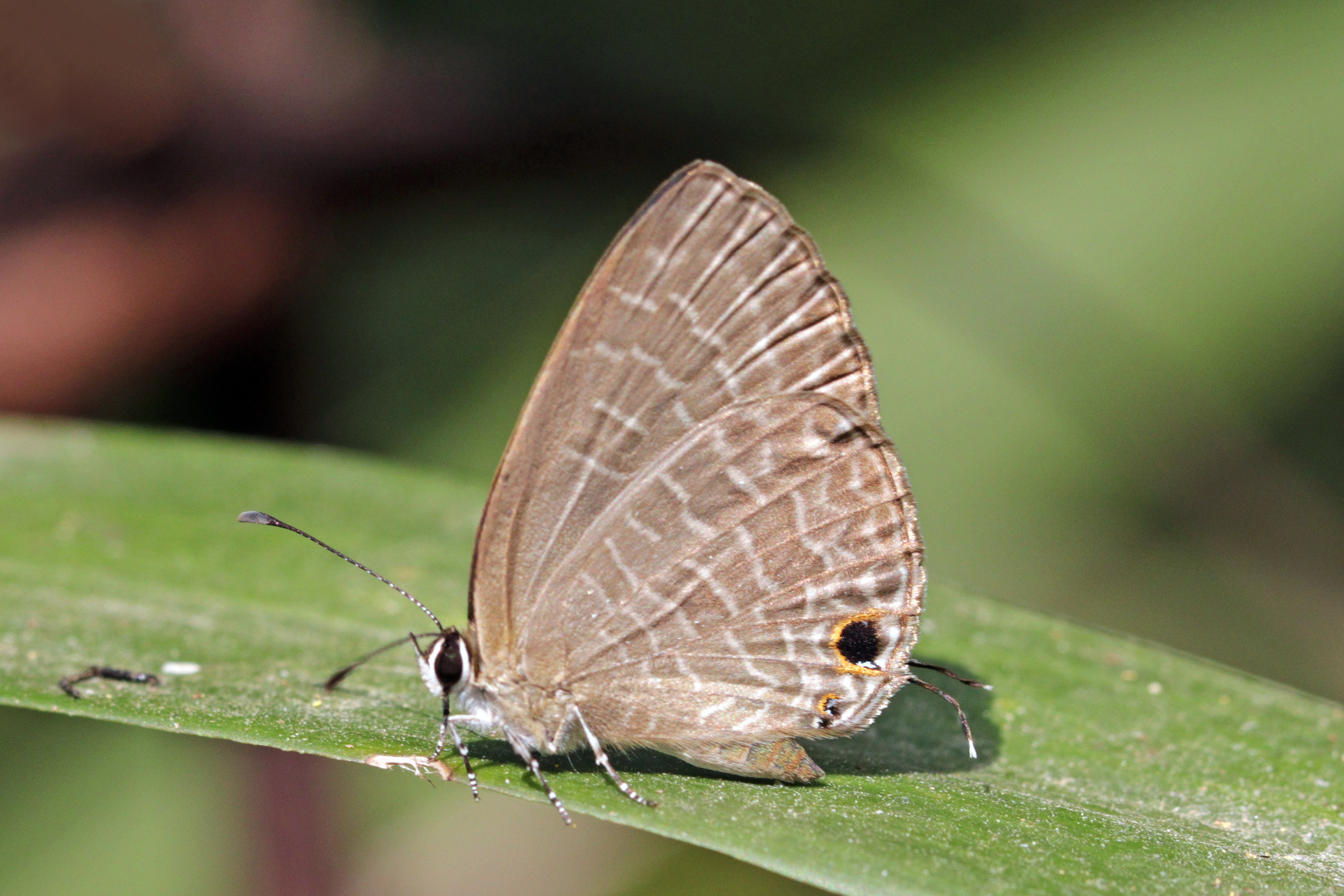
Dark cerulean Jamides bochus bochus

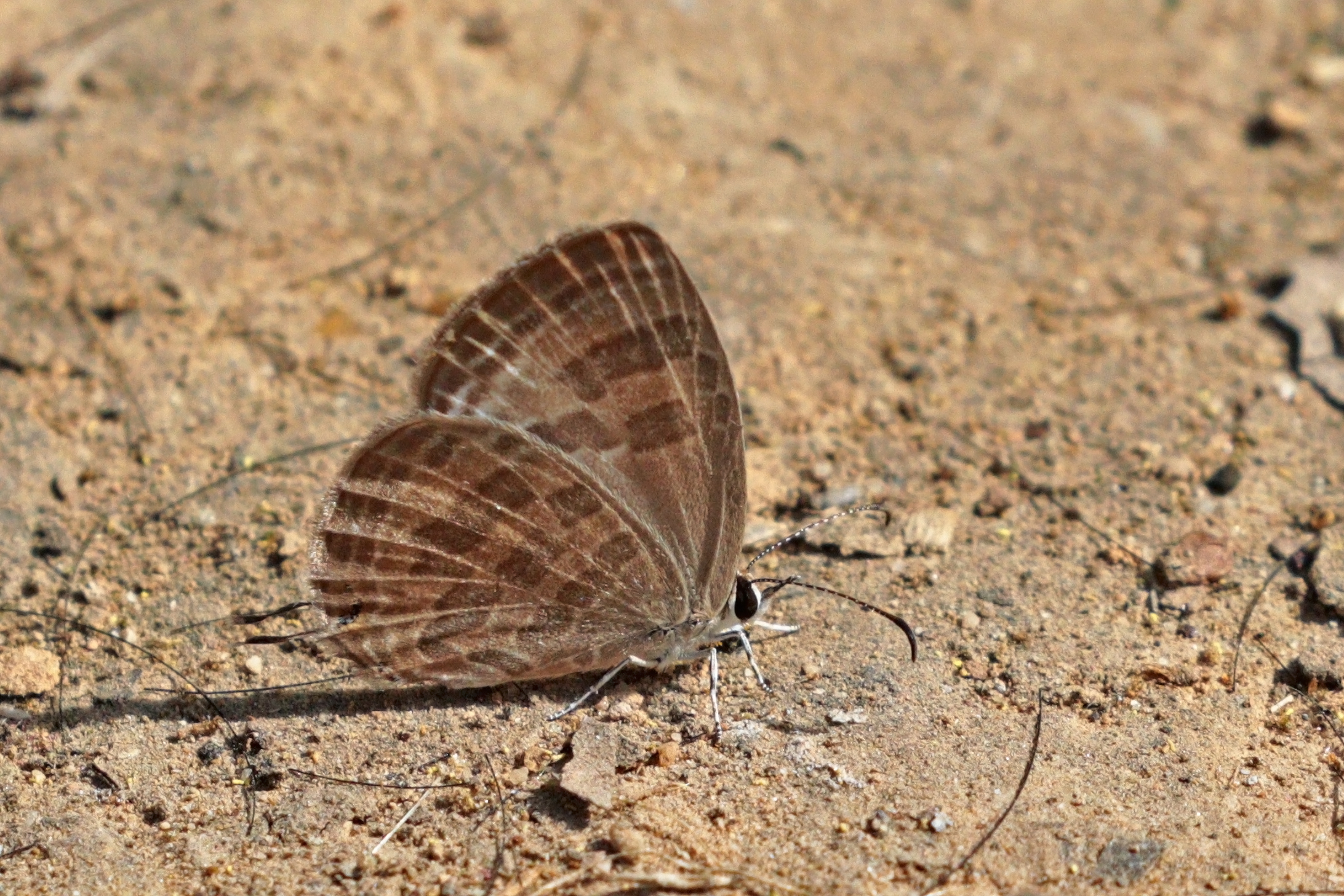
Common cerulean Jamides celeno aelianus dry-season form

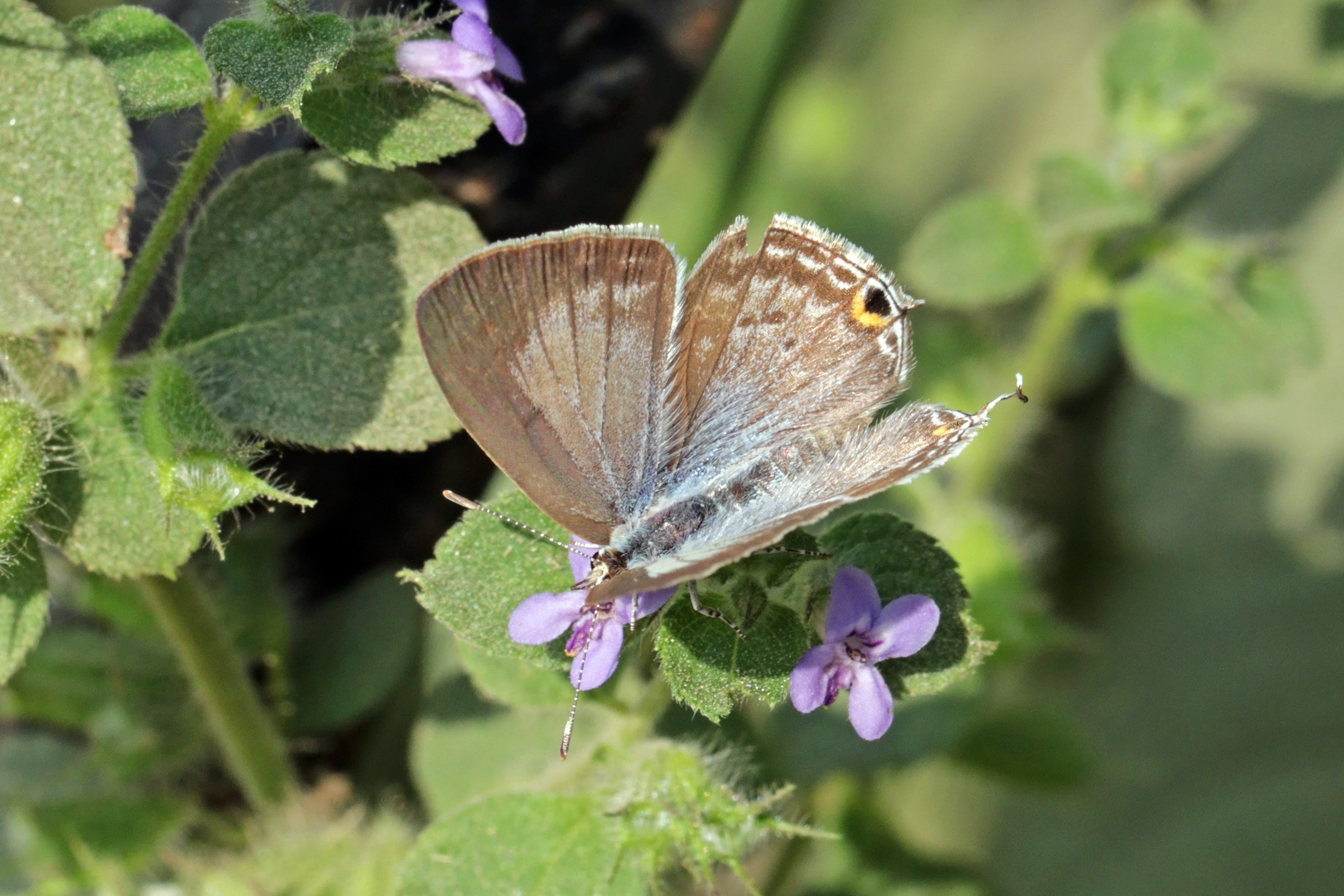
Forget-me-not Catochrysops strabo female

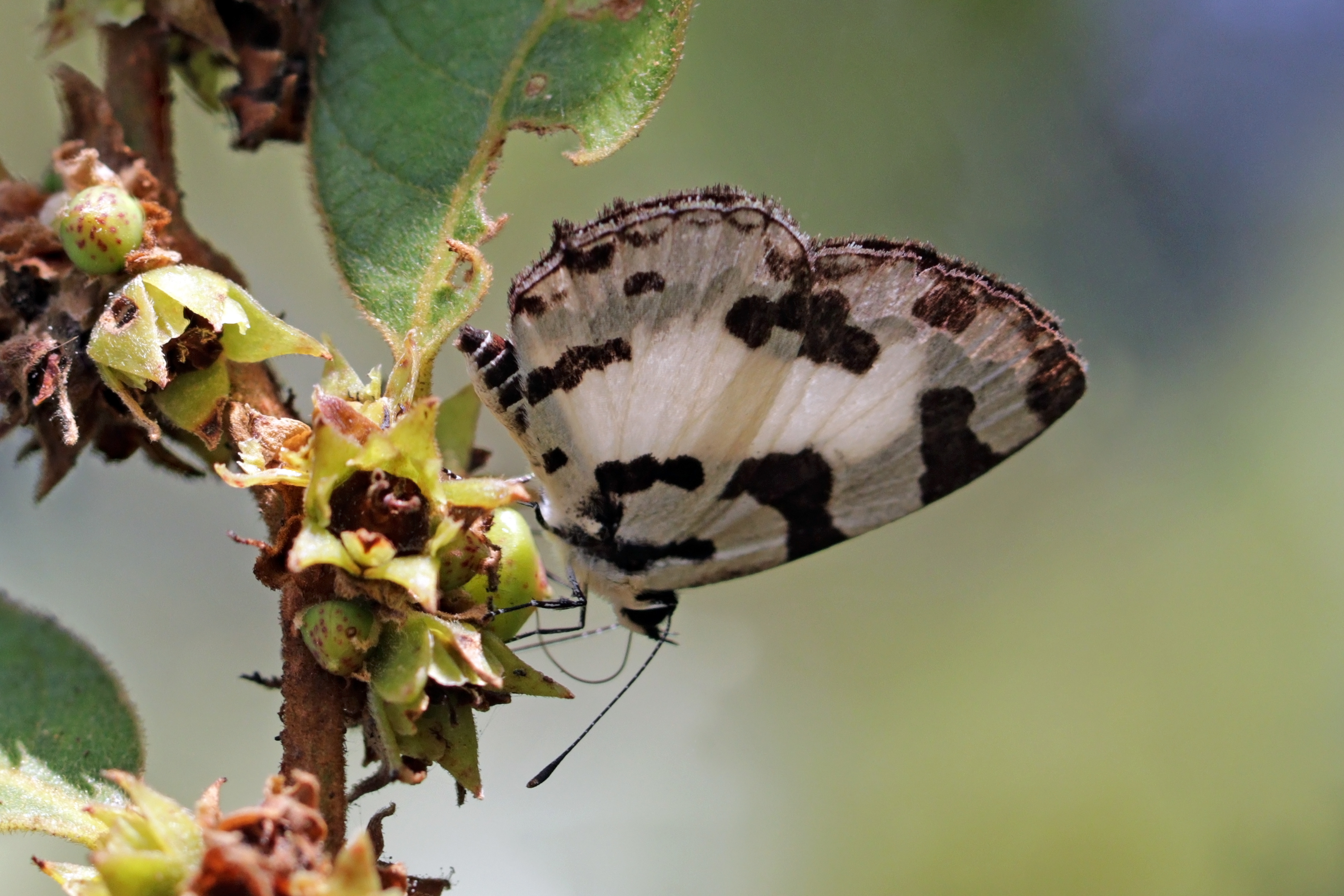
Angled Pierrot Caleta decidia

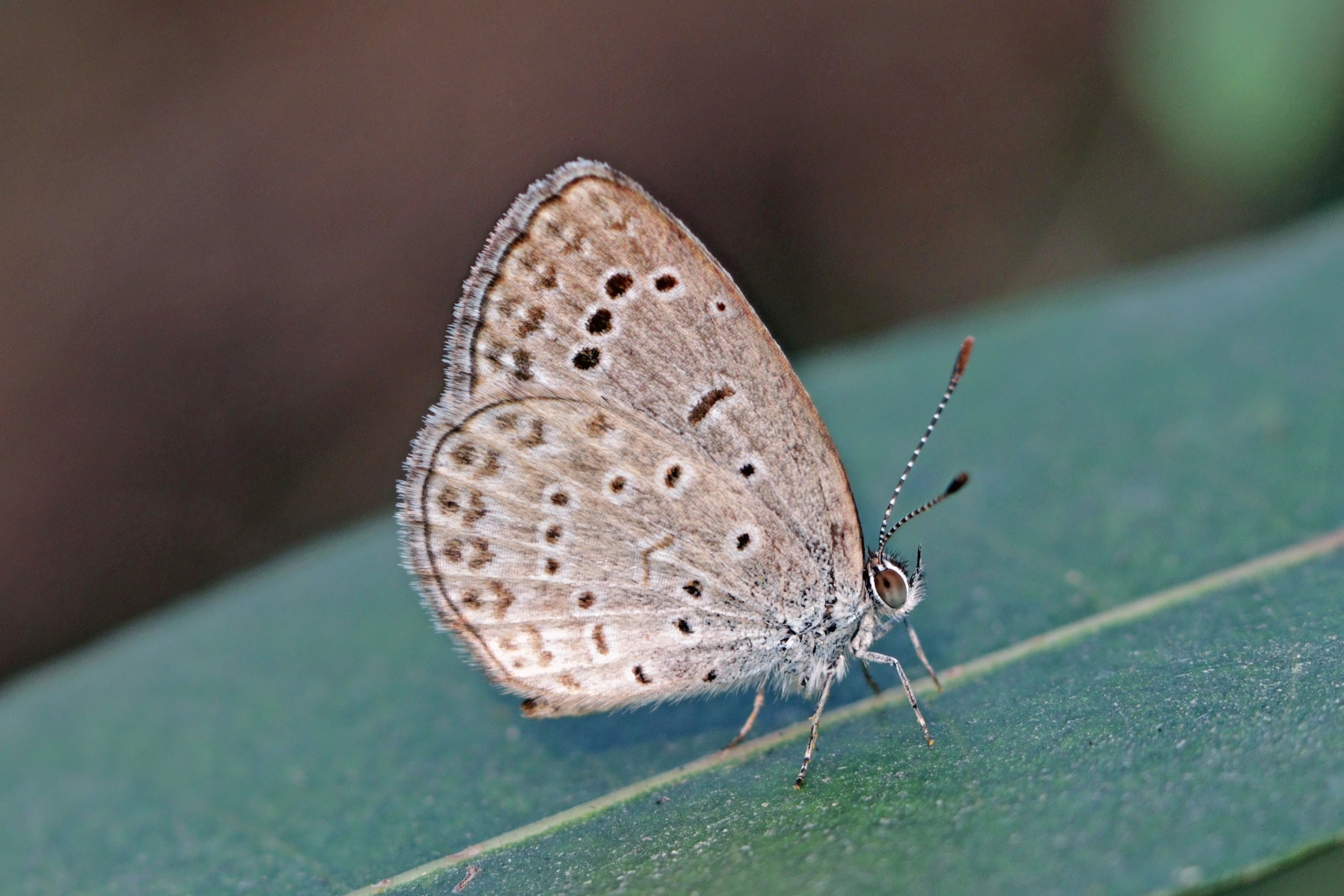
Pale grass blue Pseudozizeeria maha

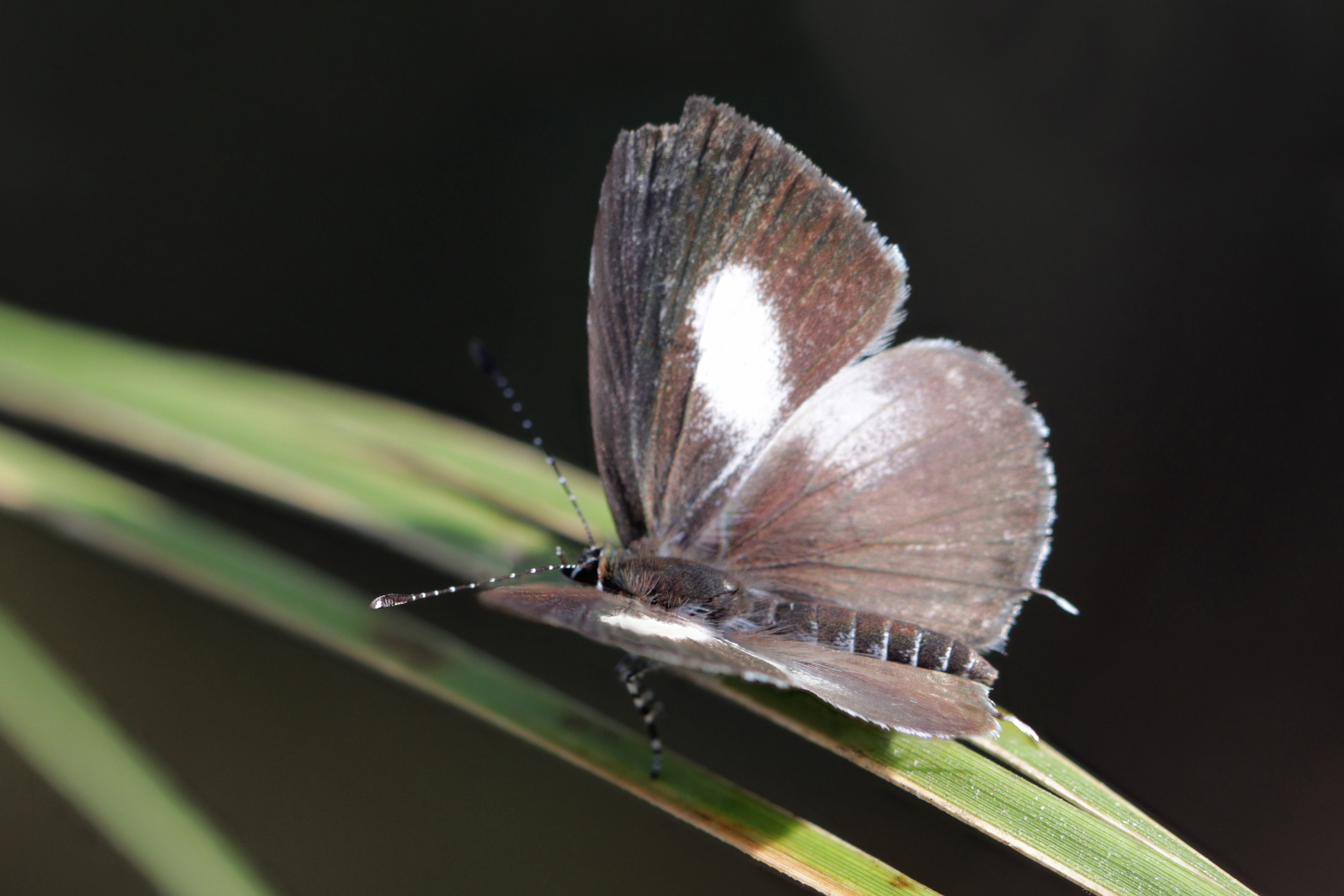
Malayan Megisba malaya sikkima female

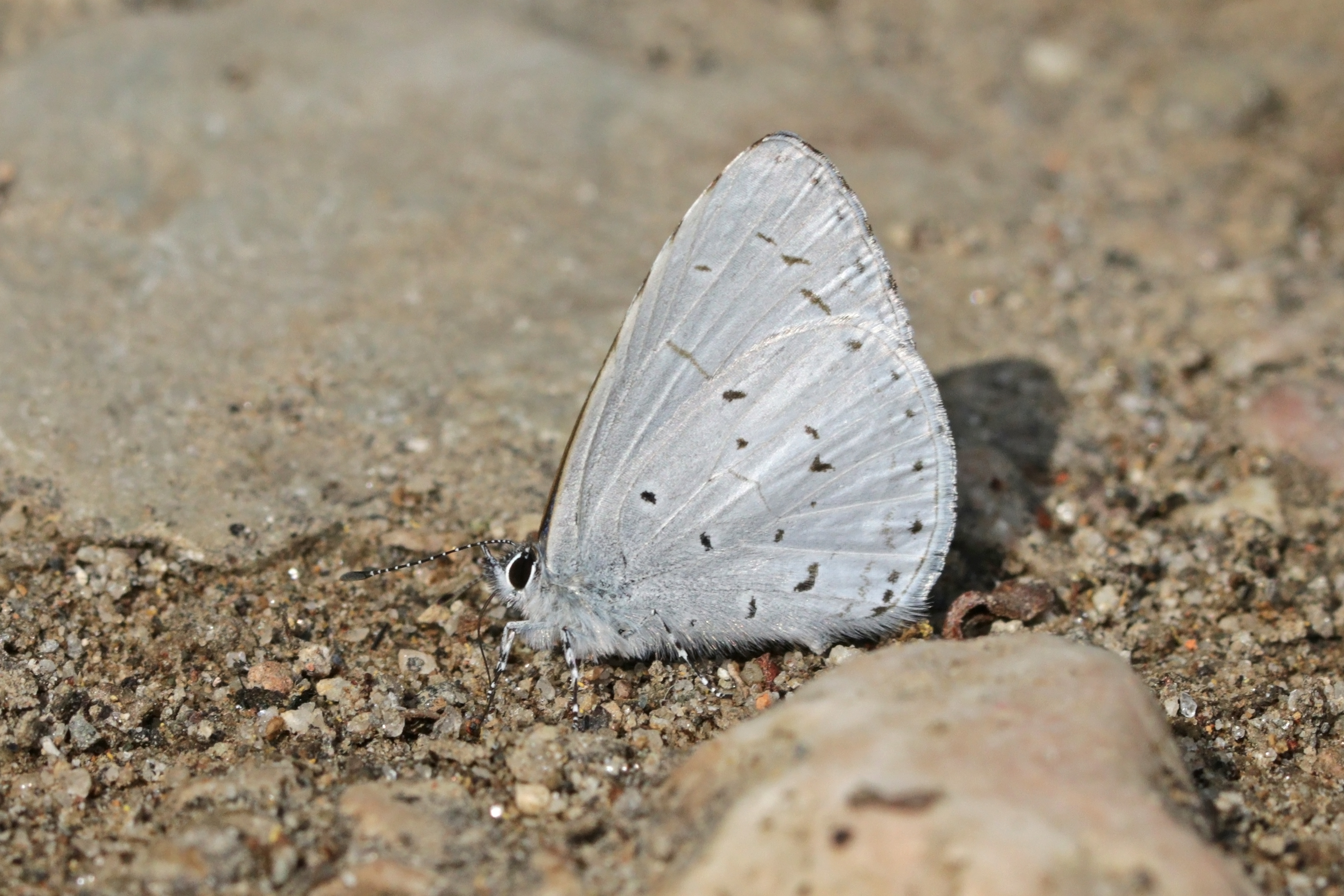
Pale hedge blue Udara dilecta

- Orthomiella pontis - straightwing blue
- Orthomiella ronkayana - Nepal straight wing blue (endemic)
- Petrelaea dana dana - dingy lineblue
- Nacaduba pactolus continentalis - large fourline-blue
- Nacaduba hermus nabo - Pale fourline-blue
- Nacaduba kurava euplea - transparent sixline-blue
- Ionolyce helicon merguiana - pointed lineblue
- Prosotas nora ardates - common lineblue
- Prosotas pia marginata - margined lineblue
- Prosotas dubiosa indica - tailless lineblue
- Prosotas lutea sivoka - banded lineblue
- Prosotas bhutea - Bhutya lineblue
- Jamides bochus bochus - dark cerulean
- Jamides celeno aelianus - common cerulean
- Jamides alecto alocina - metallic cerulean
- Catochrysops strabo strabo - forget-me-not blue
- Catochrysops panormus exiguus - silver forget-me-not blue
- Lampides boeticus - peablue
- Syntarucus plinius - zebra blue
- Castalius rosimon rosimon - common Pierrot
- Caleta caleta decidia - angled Pierrot
- Caleta elna noliteia - elbowed Pierrot
- Tarucus ananda ananda - dark Pierrot
- Tarucus waterstradti dharta - Assam Pierrot
- Tarucus callinara - spotted Pierrot
- Tarucus nara alteratus - striped Pierrot
- Zizeeria maha maha - pale grass blue
- Zizeeria karsandra - dark grass blue
- Zizina otis otis - lesser grass blue
- Zizula hylax - tiny grass blue
- Everes argiades diporides - Chapman's Cupid
- Everes huegelii huegelii - tailed Cupid
- Everes lacturnus assamica - Indian Cupid
- Azanus uranus - dull babul blue
- Pithecops corvus correctus - forest Quaker
- Neopithecops zalmora zalmora - common Quaker
- Megisba malaya sikkima - Malayan
- Lestranicus transpectus - white-banded hedge-blue
- Acytolepis puspa gisca - common hedge-blue
- Celatoxia marginata marginata - margined hedge-blue (endemic)
- Celastrina argiolus kollari - hill hedge-blue
- Celastrina argiolus jynteana
- Celastrina hersilia vipia - Naga hedge-blue
- Celastrina gigas - silvery hedge-blue
- Celastrina huegelii oreiodes - large hedge-blue
- Celastrina lavendularis limbata - plain hedge-blue
- Udara dilecta - pale hedge-blue (endemic)
- Udara albocaerulea - albocaerulean
- Oreolyce vardhana - dusky hedge-blue
  - Oreolyce vardhana vardhana
  - Oreolyce vardhana nepalica
- Euchrysops cnejus - gram blue
- Luthrodes pandava pandava - plains Cupid
- Chilades parrhasius - small Cupid
- Chilades lajus lajus - lime blue
- Freyeria trochylus orientalis - grass jewel
- Freyeria putli - least grass jewel
- Polyommatus pierinoi - Manang meadow blue (endemic)
- Polyommatus stoliczkana arene - common meadow blue
- Polyommatus nepalensis - Nepal meadow blue (endemic)
- Aricia astrarche - orange-bordered argus
- Agriades luana - Tibetan argus
- Albulina asiatica - azure mountain blue
- Albulina lehana - common mountain blue
- Albulina orbitulus lobbichleri - greenish mountain blue
- Albulina galathea galathea - large green underwing

== Family Riodinidae ==
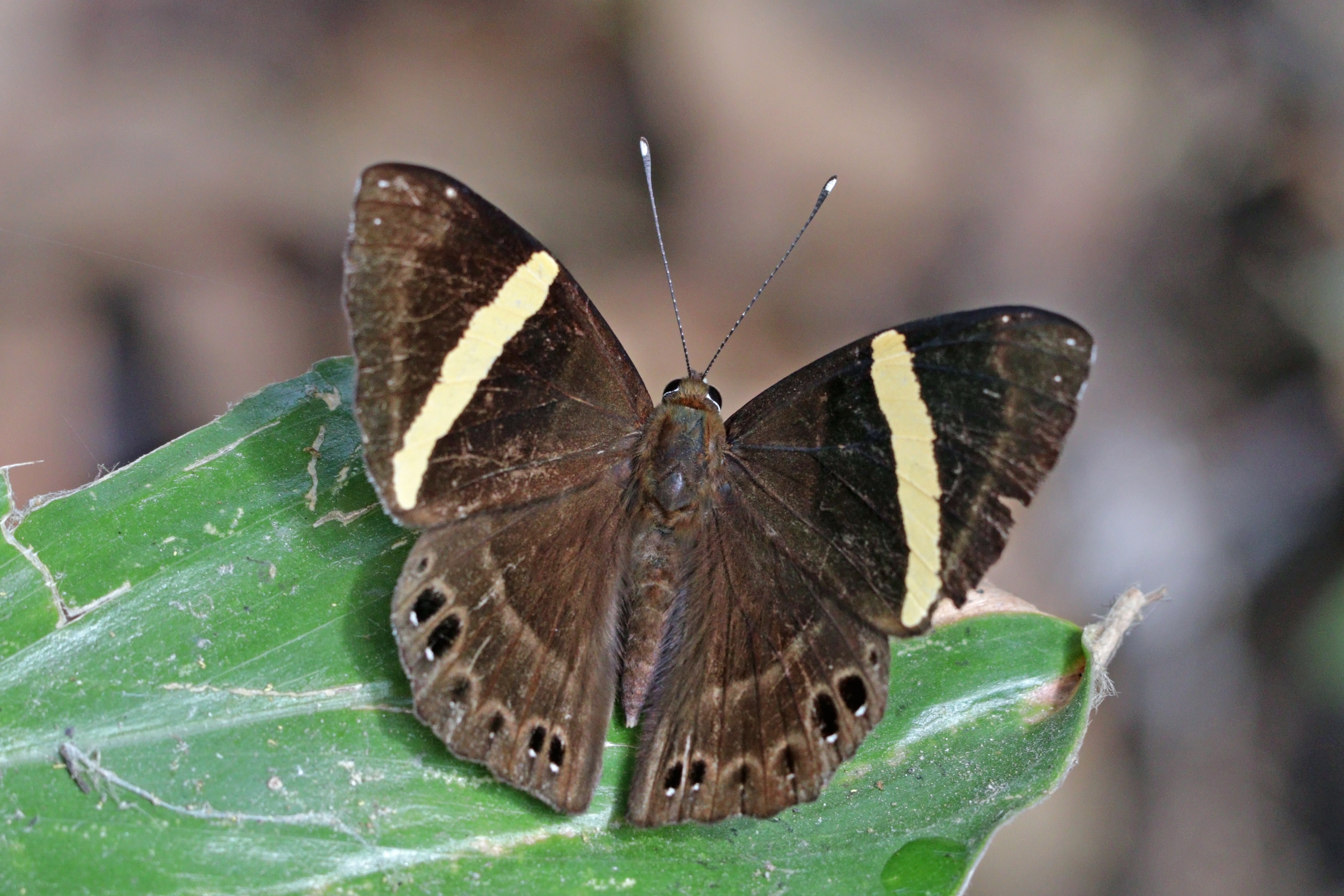
Dark judy Abisara fylla fylla male

- Dodona durga - common Punch
- Dodona dipoea - lesser Punch
- Dodona eugenes eugenes - tailed Punch
- Dodona egeon egeon - orange Punch
- Dodona ouida - mixed Punch
- Dodona adonira - striped Punch
- Abisara bifasciata suffusa - plum Judy
- Abisara fylla fylla - dark Judy
- Abisara chela chela - spot Judy
- Abisara neophron neophronoides - tailed Judy
- Zemeros flegyas indicus - Punchinello

== Family Nymphalidae - nymphalids ==
=== Subfamily Libytheinae ===
- Libythea celtis lepita - common beak
- Libythea myrrha sanguinalis - club beak (endemic)

=== Subfamily Heliconiinae ===
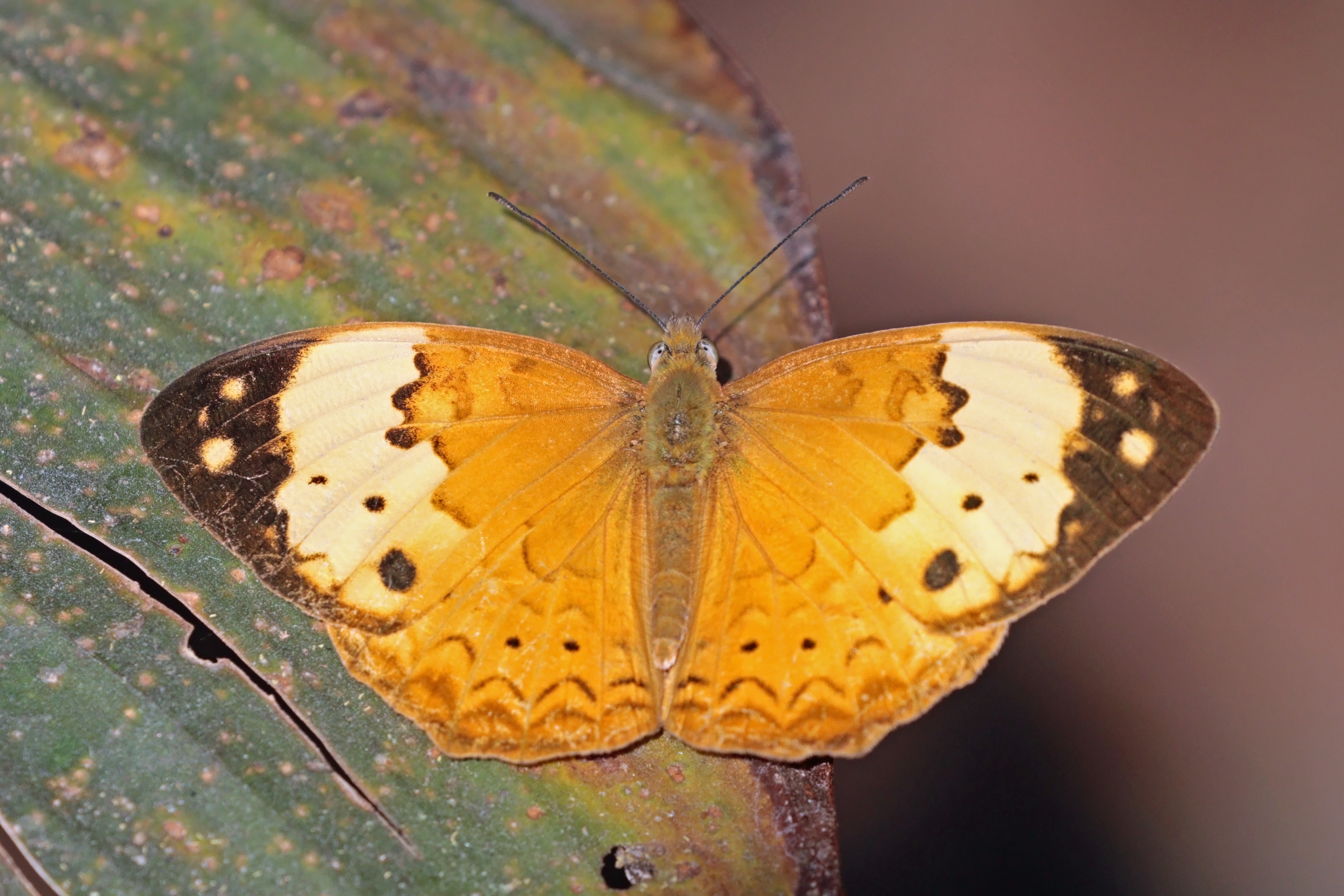
Rustic Cupha erymanthis lotis

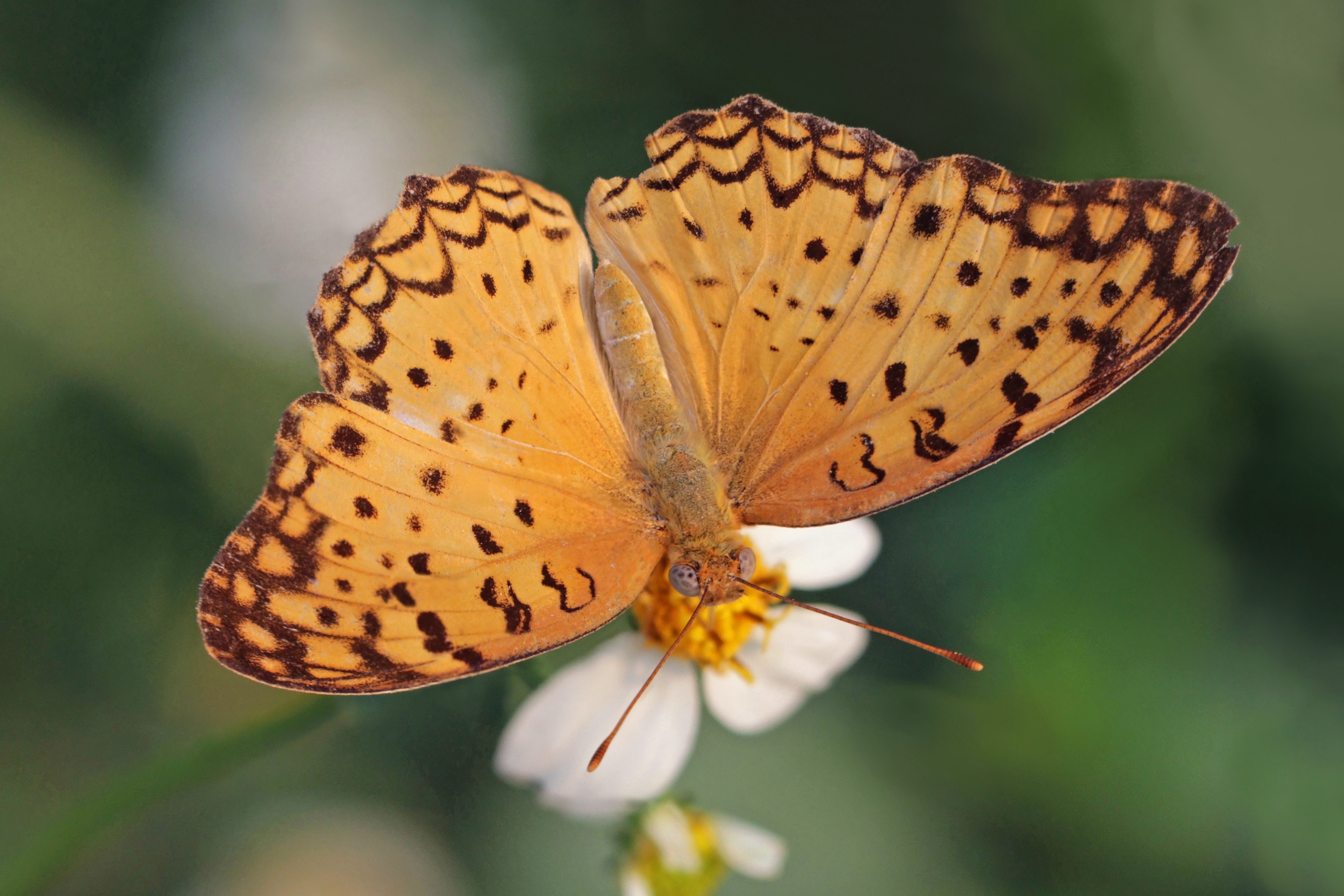
Common leopard Phalanta phalantha

- Acraea violae - tawny coster
- Acraea issoria - yellow coster
- Cethosia biblis tisamena - red lacewing
- Cethosia cyane - leopard lacewing
- Cupha erymanthis lotis - rustic
- Vagrans egista - vagrant
- Vindula erota erota - cruiser
- Cirrochroa aoris aoris - large yeoman
- Cirrochroa tyche mithila - common yeoman
- Phalanta phalantha phalantha - common leopard
- Argynnis hyperbius hyperbius - Indian fritillary
- Argynnis childreni - large silverstripe
  - Argynnis childreni childreni (endemic)
  - Argynnis childreni sakontala (endemic)
- Fabriciana kamala - common silverstripe
- Fabriciana adippe jaindeva - highbrown silverspot
- Speyeria clara - silverstreak
  - Speyeria clara clara
  - Speyeria clara shieldsi
- Issoria lathonia - Queen of Spain fritillary (endemic)
- Issoria annapurnae - Annapurna silverspot
- Issoria mackinnonii - Mackinnon's silverspot
- Issoria gemmata - gem silverspot

=== Subfamily Nymphalinae ===
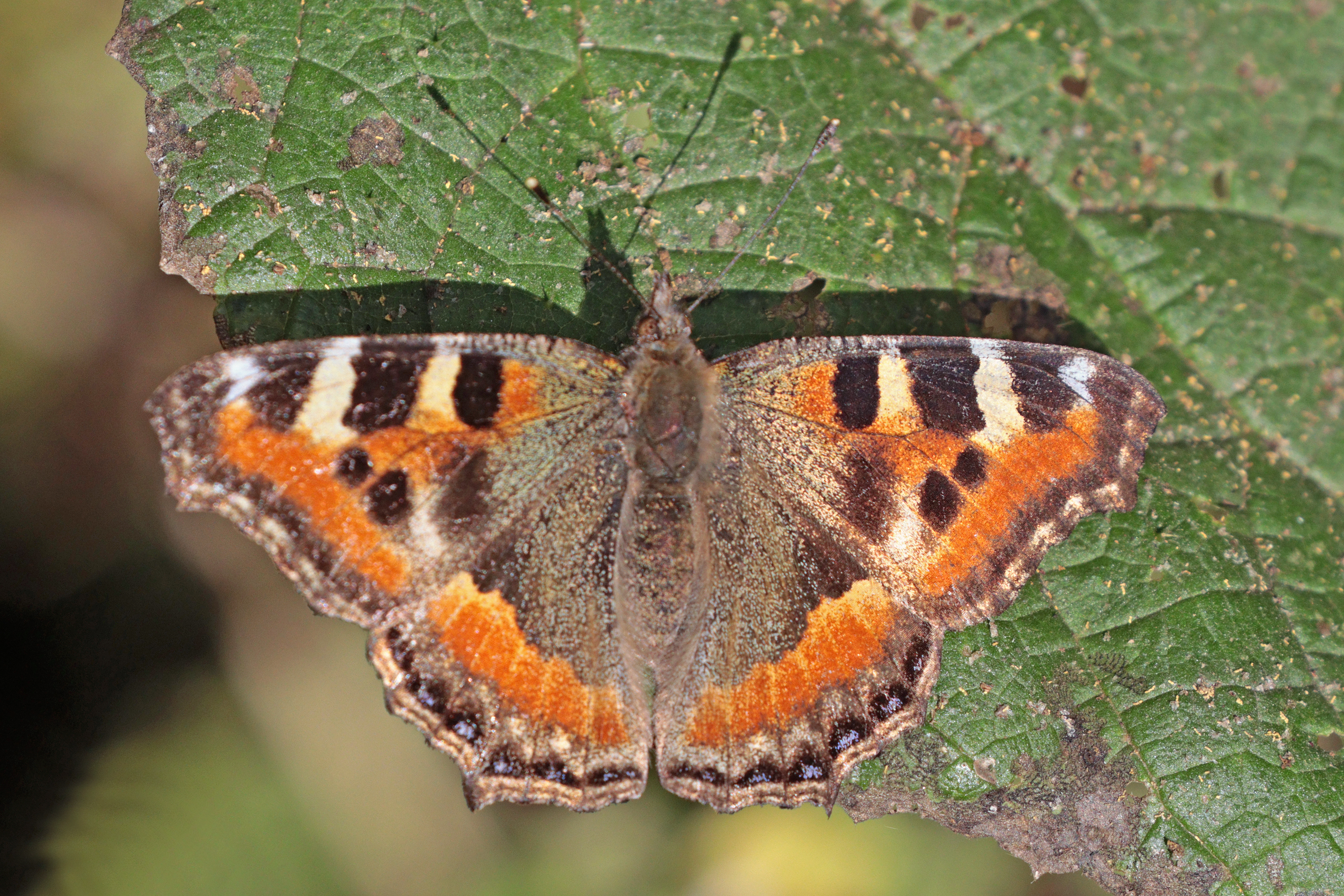
Indian tortoiseshell Aglais caschmirensis aesis

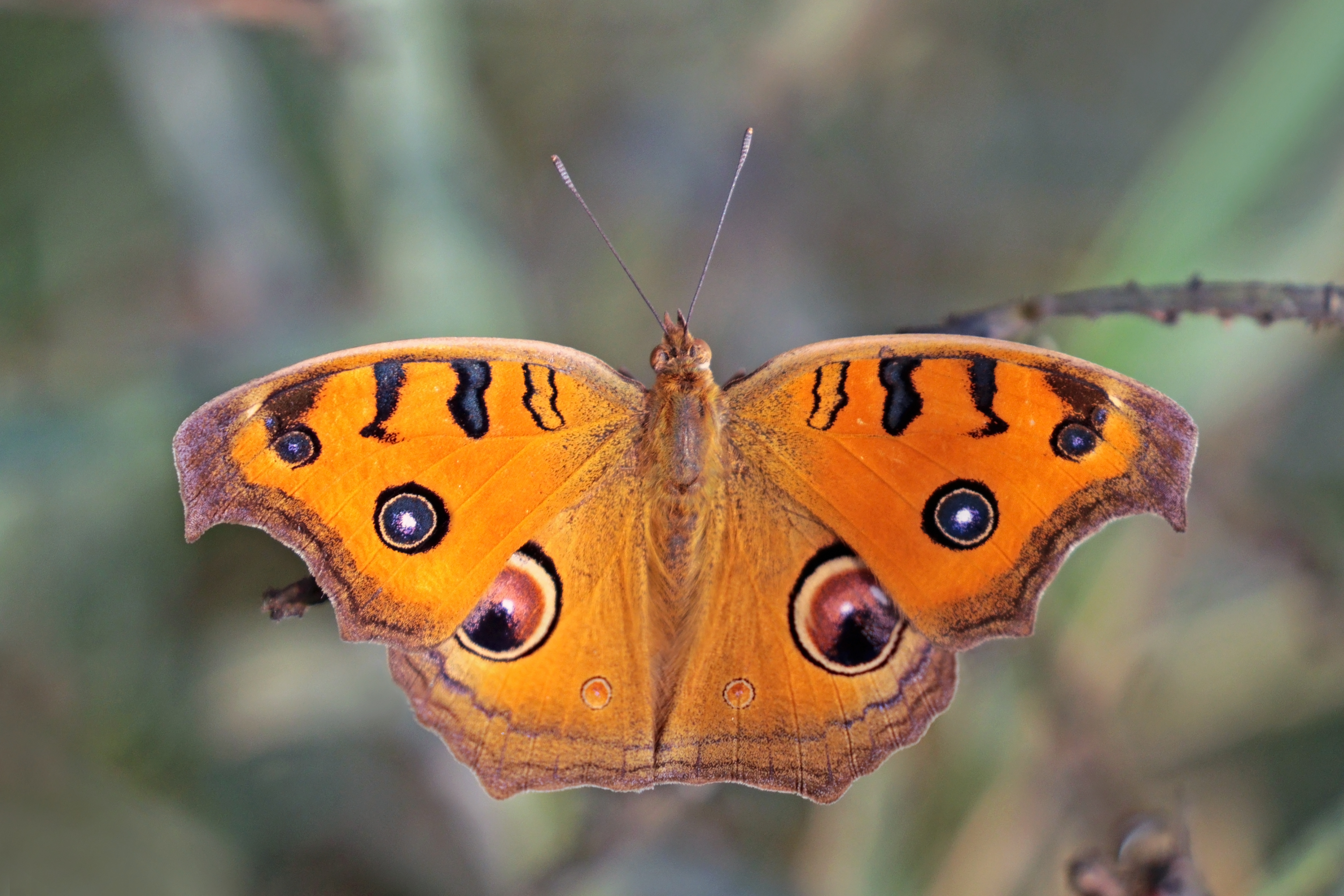
Peacock pansy Junonia almana almana dry-season form

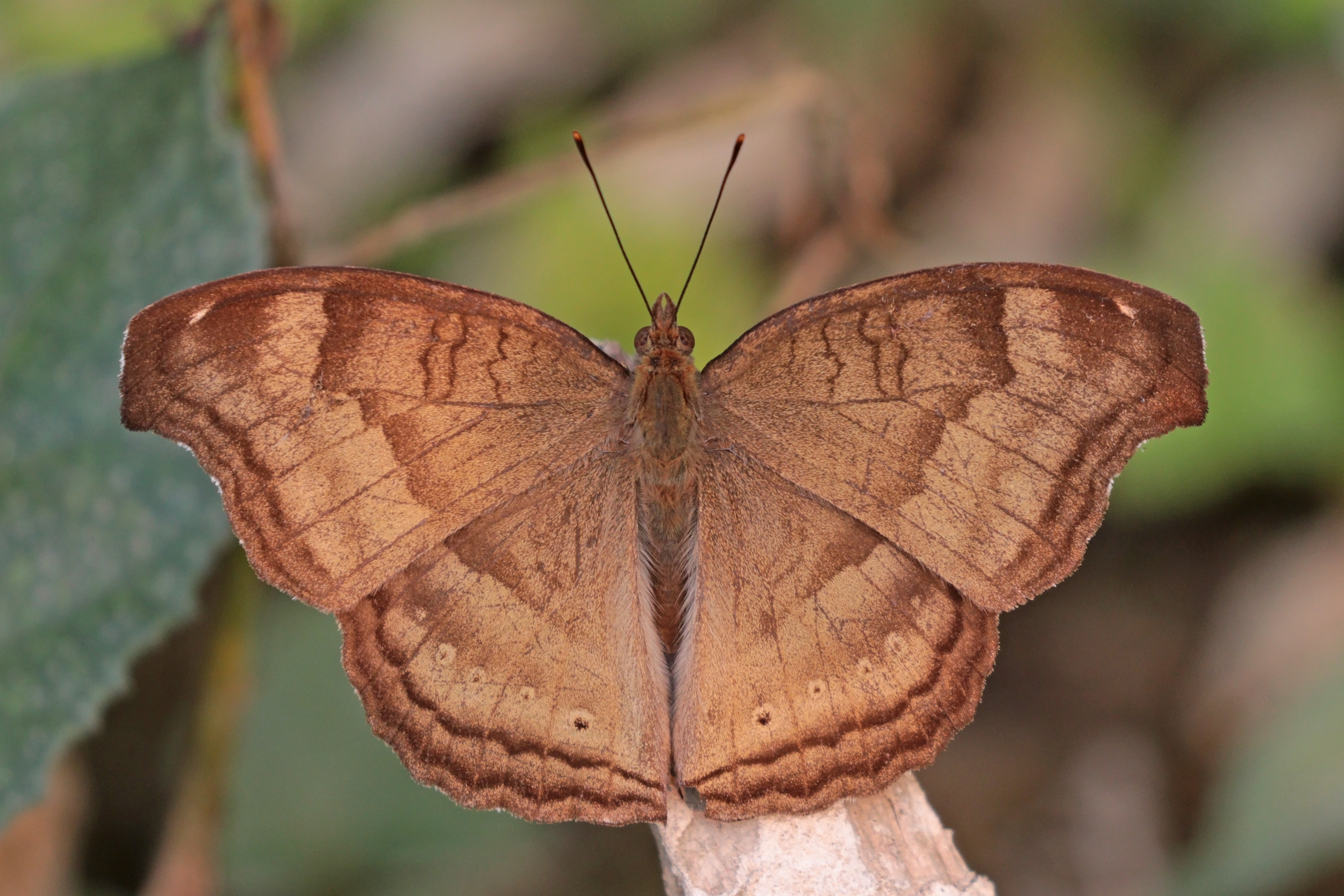
Chocolate pansy Junonia iphita

- Symbrenthia lilaea khasiana - common jester
- Symbrenthia hypselis cotanda - spotted jester
- Symbrenthia brabira sivokana - Himalayan jester
- Symbrenthia niphanda niphanda - blue-tail jester
- Vanessa cardui - painted lady
- Vanessa indica - Indian red admiral
- Aglais caschmirensis aesis - Indian tortoiseshell
- Aglais ladakensis - Ladakh tortoiseshell
- Nymphalis xanthomelas fervescens - large tortoiseshell
- Kaniska canace canace - blue admiral
- Polygonia agnicula - Nepal comma (endemic)
- Junonia hierta hierta - yellow pansy
- Junonia orithya ocyale - blue pansy
- Junonia lemonias - lemon pansy
- Junonia almana almana - peacock pansy
- Junonia atlites atlites - grey pansy
- Junonia iphita - chocolate pansy
- Hypolimnas misippus - Danaid eggfly
- Hypolimnas bolina jacintha - great eggfly
- Kallima inachus - orange oakleaf
- Doleschallia bisaltide indica - autumn leaf
- Melitaea arcesia sikkimensis - blackvein fritillary

=== Subfamily Biblidinae ===
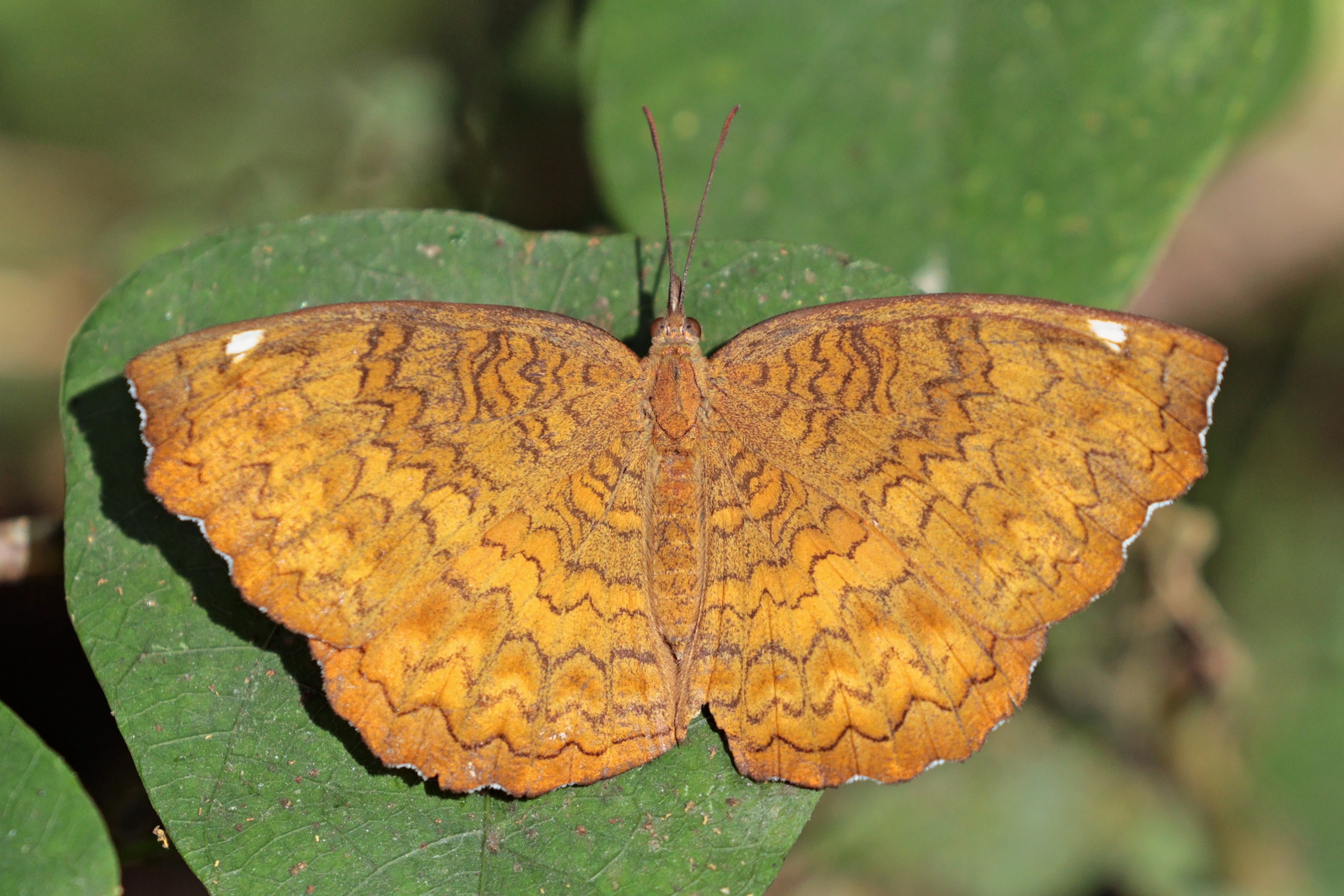
Common castor Ariadne merione tapestrina dry-season form

- Ariadne ariadne pallidor - angled castor
- Ariadne merione - common castor

=== Subfamily Limenitidinae ===
==== Tribe Limenitidini ====
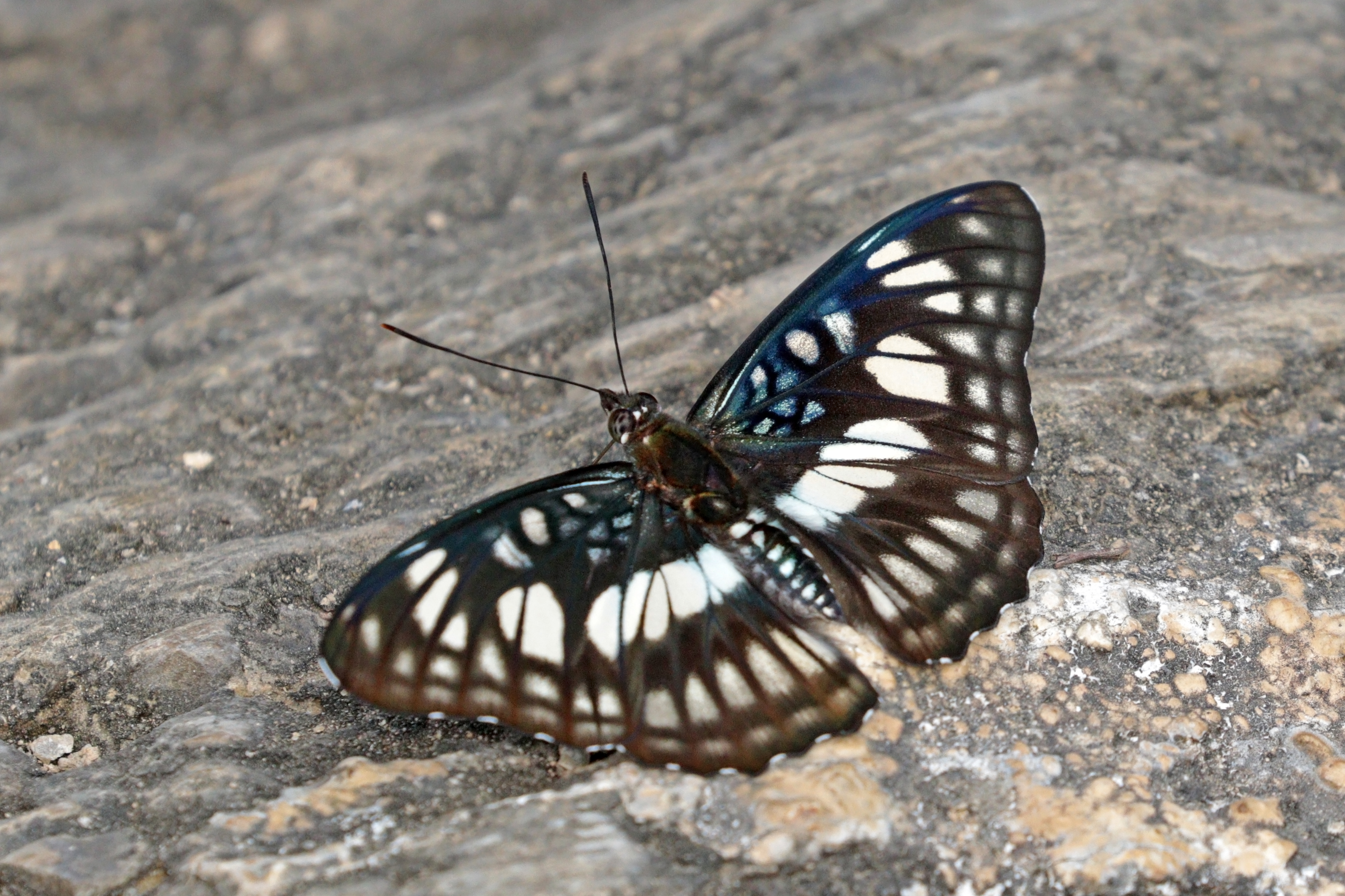
Blackvein sergeant Athyma ranga ranga female

- Limenitis trivena pallida - Indian white admiral
- Limenitis procris procris - commander
- Limenitis zulema - scarce white commodore
- Limenitis dudu - white commodore
- Limenitis daraxa daraxa - green commodore
- Limenitis zayla - bicolour commodore
- Limenitis danava - common commodore
- Lebadea martha martha - knight
- Neurosigma siva siva - panther
- Abrota ganga ganga - sergeant major
- Athyma perius - common sergeant
- Athyma jina jina - Bhutan sergeant
- Athyma asura asura - studded sergeant
- Athyma ranga ranga - blackvein sergeant
- Athyma opalina orientalis - Himalayan sergeant
- Athyma selenophora selenophora - staff sergeant
- Athyma zeroca zeroca - small staff sergeant
- Athyma cama cama - orange staff sergeant
- Athyma nefte inara - colour sergeant

==== Tribe Neptini ====
- Pantoporia hordonia hordonia - common lascar
- Pantoporia sandaka davidsoni - extra lascar
- Lasippa viraja viraja - yellowjack sailer
- Neptis clinia susrata - sullied sailer
- Neptis sappho astola - Pallas' sailer
- Neptis hylas kamarupa - common sailer
- Neptis soma butleri - creamy sailer
- Neptis nata - clear sailer
  - Neptis nata adipala
  - Neptis nata yerburii
- Neptis mahendra mahendra - Himalayan sailer
- Neptis pseudovikasi - dingy sailer
- Neptis miah miah - small yellow sailer
- Neptis sankara - broad-banded sailer
  - Neptis sankara sankara
  - Neptis sankara amba
- Neptis cartica cartica - plain sailer (endemic)
- Neptis magadha khasiana - spotted sailer
- Neptis ananta ochracea - yellow sailer
- Neptis zaida bhutanica - pale green sailer
- Neptis armandia melba - variegated sailer
- Neptis radha radha - great yellow sailer
- Neptis narayana nana - broadstick sailer
- Neptis manasa manasa - pale hockeystick sailer
- Neptis nycteus - hockeystick sailer
- Phaedyma aspasia kathmandia - great hockeystick sailer
- Phaedyma columella ophiana - short-banded sailer

==== Tribe Euthaliini ====
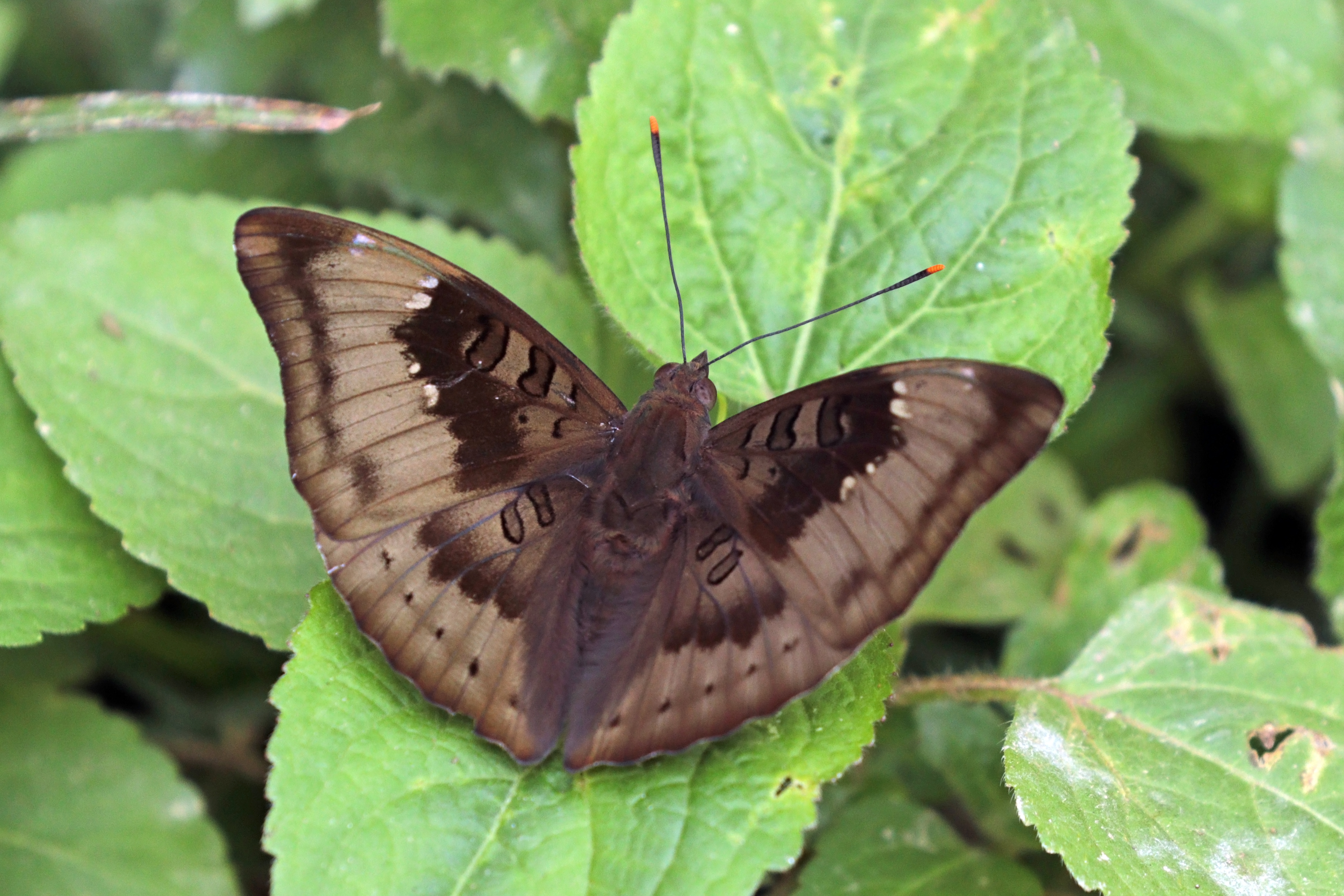
Common baron Euthalia aconthea suddhodana male

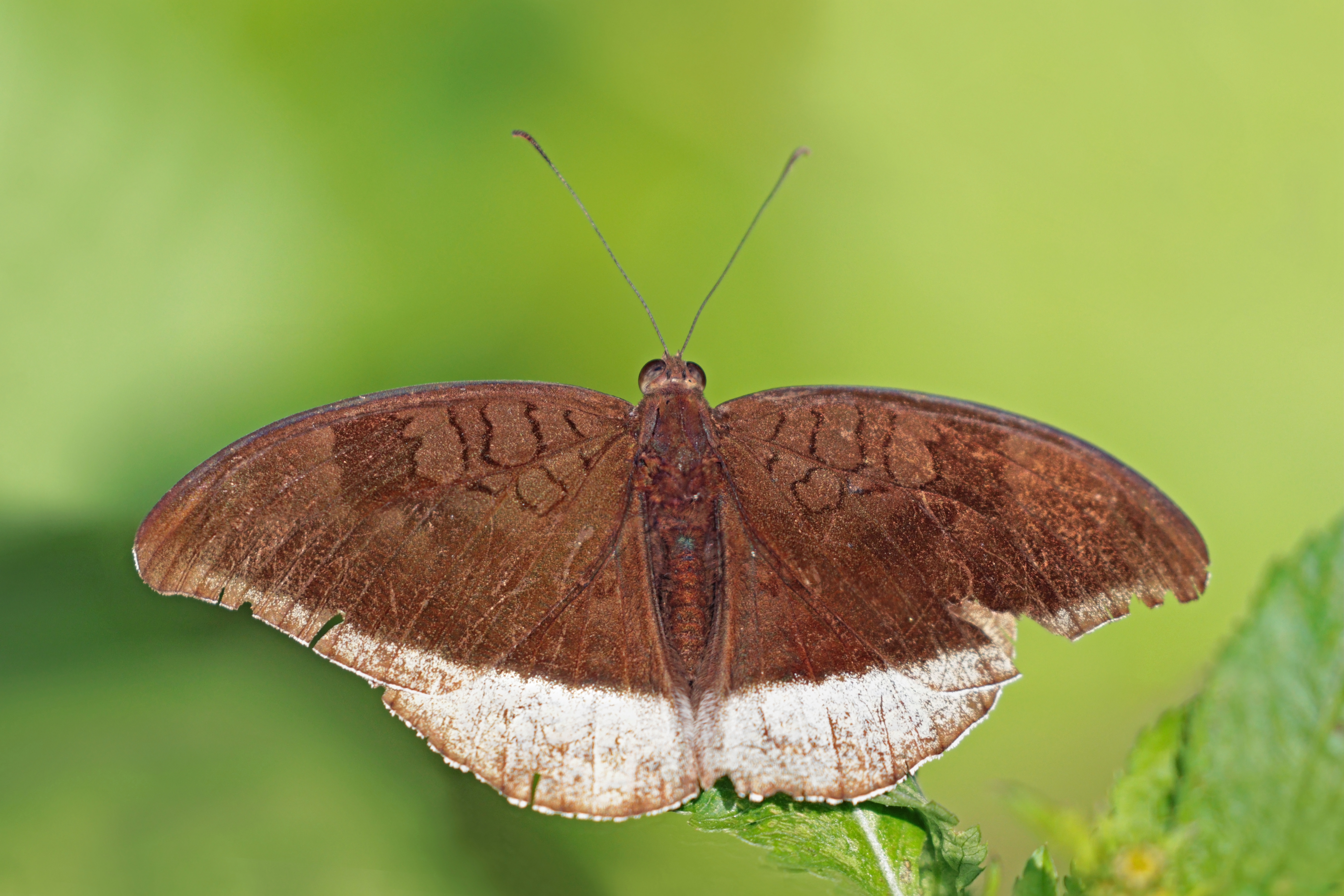
Grey count Tanaecia lepidea lepidea

- Tanaecia julii appiades - common earl
- Tanaecia lepidea lepidea - grey count
- Euthalia aconthea suddhodana - common baron
- Euthalia monina arhat - powdered baron
- Euthalia telchinia - blue baron
- Euthalia phemius - white-bordered blue baron
- Euthalia lubentina indica - gaudy baron
- Euthalia franciae franciae - French duke (endemic)
- Euthalia durga durga - blue duke
- Euthalia duda - blue duchess
- Euthalia nara nara - bronze duke
- Euthalia sahadeva sahadeva - green duke
- Euthalia patala patala - grand duchess
- Symphedra nais - baronet

=== Subfamily Cyrestinae ===
- Pseudergolis wedah - tabby
- Dichorragia nesimachus - constable
- Stibochiona nicea - popinjay (endemic)
- Cyrestis thyodamas - common map
- Chersonesia risa - common maplet

=== Subfamily Apaturinae ===
- Apatura ambica - Indian purple emperor
  - Apatura ambica ambica
  - Apatura ambica chitralensis
- Apatura chevana - sergeant emperor
- Rohana parisatis parisatis - black prince
- Dilipa morgiana - golden emperor
- Hestina nama nama - Circe
- Diagora persimilis persimilis - common Siren
- Diagora nicevillei - scarce Siren
- Euripus consimilis - painted courtesan
- Herona marathus marathus - pasha
- Sephisa dichroa - western courtier
- Sephisa chandra chandra - eastern courtier

=== Subfamily Charaxinae ===
- Charaxes bernardus imna - tawny raja
- Charaxes bernardus hemana
- Charaxes bernardus hierax
- Charaxes aristogiton - scarce tawny raja
- Charaxes marmax - yellow raja
- Charaxes kahruba - variegated raja
- Charaxes solon - black raja
- Polyura athamas - common nawab
- Polyura agraria - Swinhoe's nawab
- Polyura arja - pallid nawab
- Polyura dolon centralis - stately nawab
- Polyura eudamippus eudamippus - great nawab

=== Subfamily Morphinae ===
- Enispe euthymius tesallata - red caliph
- Discophora sondaica zal - common duffer
- Thaumantis diores diores - jungle-glory
- Stichophthalma camadeva camadeva - northern jungle-queen

=== Subfamily Satyrinae ===
==== Tribe Melanitini ====
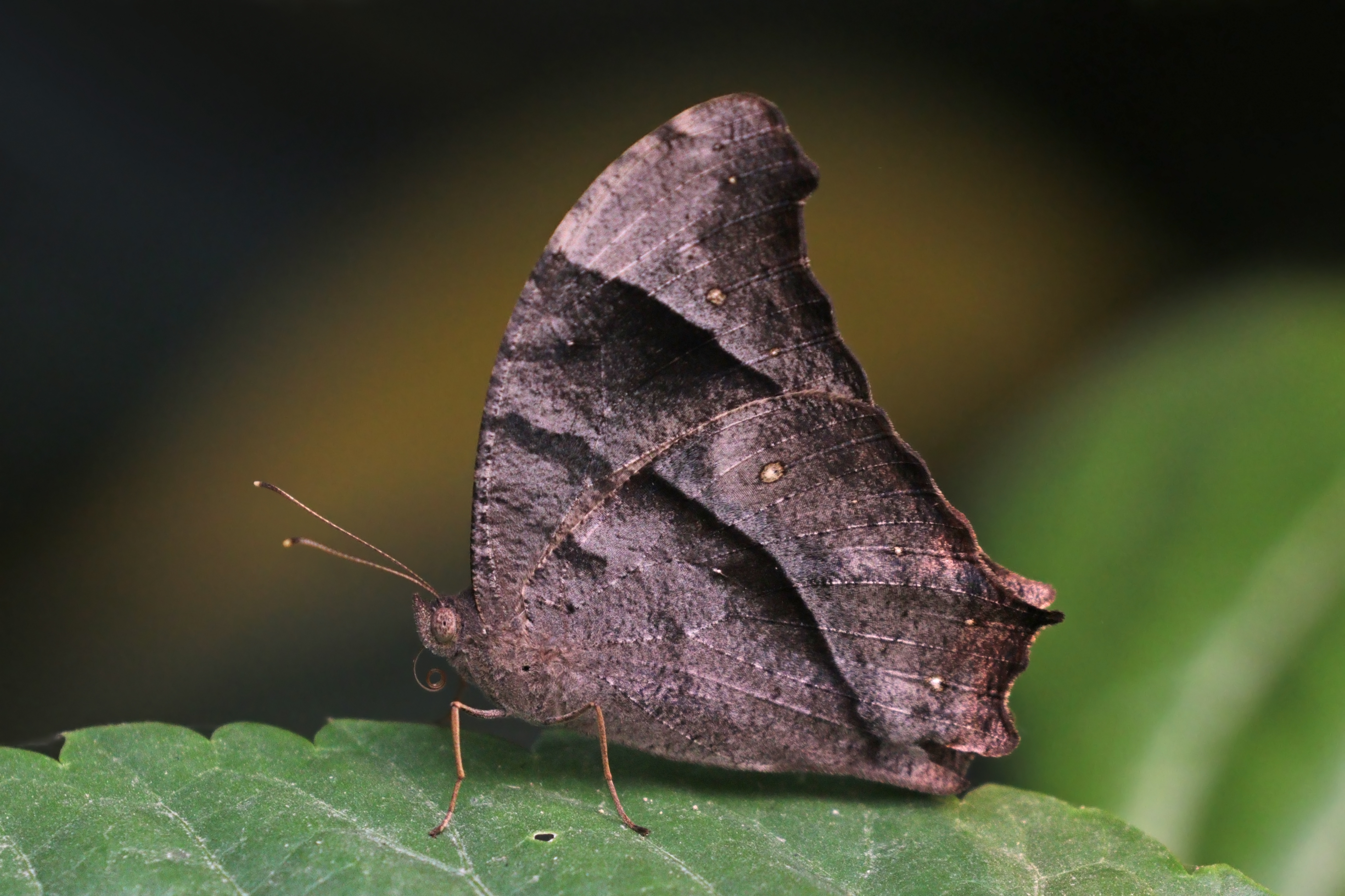
Common evening brown Melanitis leda leda dry-season form

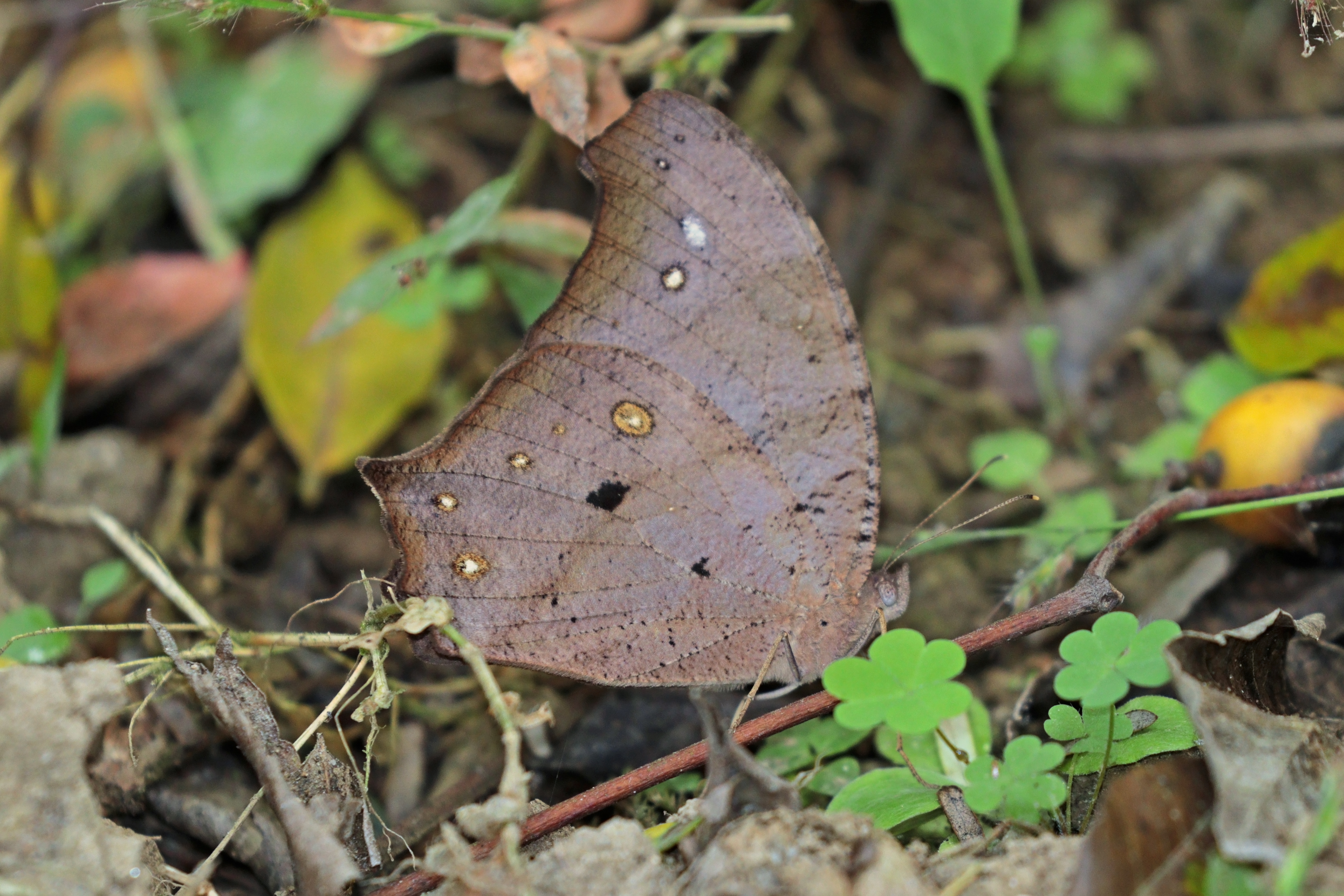
Common evening brown Melanitis leda leda dry-season form

- Melanitis leda ismene - common evening brown
- Melanitis phedima bela - dark evening brown
- Melanitis zitenius zitenius - great evening brown

==== Tribe Lethini ====
- Lethe baladeva baladeva - treble silverstripe
- Lethe europa niladana - bamboo treebrown
- Lethe rohria rohria - common treebrown
- Lethe confusa confusa - banded treebrown
- Lethe insana dinarbus - common forester
- Lethe serbonis teesta - brown forester
- Lethe vindhya - black forester
- Lethe kansa - bamboo forester
- Lethe sinorix - red-tail forester
- Lethe latiaris hige - pale forester
- Lethe verma sintica - straight-banded treebrown
- Lethe siderea - scarce woodbrown
- Lethe sidonis sidonis - common woodbrown
- Lethe dakwania - Garhwal woodbrown
- Lethe nicetella - small woodbrown
- Lethe nicetas - yellow woodbrown
- Lethe maitrya maitrya - barred woodbrown
- Lethe tristigmata - spotted mystic
- Lethe jalaurida jalaurida - small silverfork
- Lethe jalaurida elwesi
- Lethe atkinsonia - small goldenfork
- Lethe goalpara goalpara - large goldenfork
- Lethe sura - lilacfork
- Lethe dura gammiei - scarce lilacfork
- Nemetis mekara mekara - straight red forester
- Nemetis chandica - angled red forester
- Lethe distans - scarce red forester
- Neope pulaha pulaha - veined labyrinth
- Neope pulahoides tamur - Tamur labyrinth
- Neope pulahina - scarce labyrinth
- Neope bhadra bhadra - tailed labyrinth
- Patala yama yama - dusky labyrinth
- Patala yama buckleyi
- Lasiommata menava menava - dark wall brown
- Lasiommata schakra - common wall brown
- Rhaphicera moorei - small tawny wall
- Rhaphicera satricus satricus - large tawny wall
- Crebeta lehmanni - Nepal woodland brown
- Orinoma damaris - tigerbrown

==== Tribe Elymniini ====
- Elymnias hypermnestra undularis - common palmfly
- Elymnias nesaea - tiger palmfly
- Elymnias malelas malelas - spotted palmfly
- Elymnias patna patna - blue-streaked palmfly
- Elymnias vasudeva vasudeva - Jezebel palmfly

==== Tribe Mycalesini ====
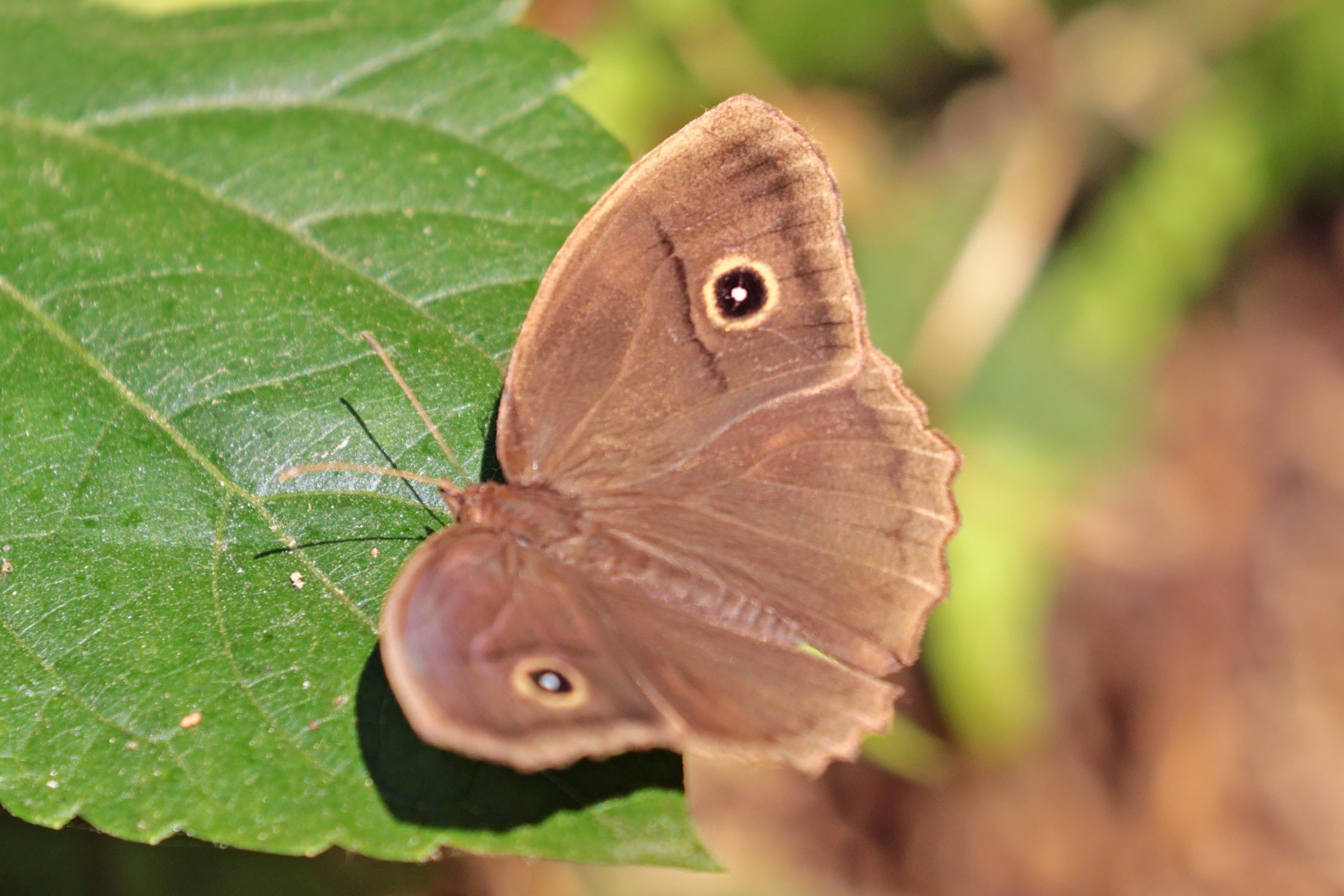
Dark-brand bushbrown Mycalesis mineus mineus dry-season form

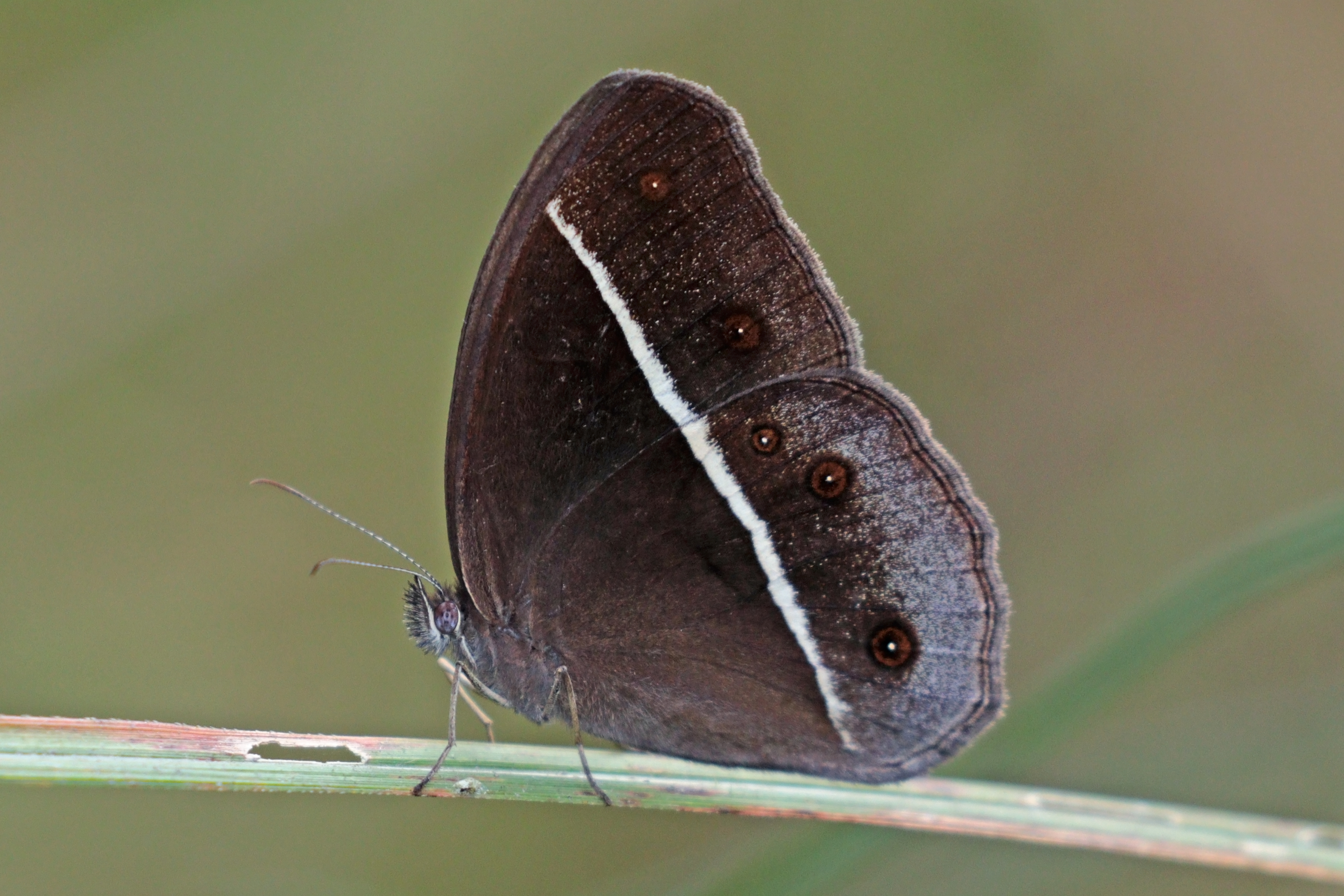
Jungle brown Orsotriaena medus medus dry-season form

- Mycalesis anaxias aemate - white-bar bushbrown
- Mycalesis adamsonii - double-branded bushbrown
- Mycalesis francisca sanatana - lilacine bushbrown
- Mycalesis perseus blasius - common bushbrown
- Mycalesis mineus mineus - dark-brand bushbrown
- Mycalesis visala visala - long-brand bushbrown
- Mycalesis suaveolens tytleri - Wood-Mason's bushbrown
- Mycalesis heri - Moore's bushbrown
- Mycalesis nicotia - bright-eye bushbrown
- Mycalesis malsara - white-line bushbrown
- Mycalesis mamerta - blind-eye bushbrown
- Mycalesis lepcha - Lepcha bushbrown
- Orsotriaena medus medus - jungle brown

==== Tribe Ypthimini ====
- Ypthima sakra - Himalayan fivering
- Ypthima hannyngtoni khumbuensis - Hannyngton's fivering
- Ypthima parasakra - Himalayan fourring
- Ypthima baldus - common fivering
- Ypthima indecora - western fivering
- Ypthima avanta avanta - jewel fourring
- Ypthima singala - small jewel fourring
- Ypthima huebneri - common fourring
- Ypthima kasmira - Kashmir fourring
- Ypthima nareda - large threering
- Ypthima asterope mahratta - common threering
- Ypthima inica - lesser threering
- Ypthima newara - Newar threering
- Ypthima confusa - confusing threering
- Dallacha hyagriva hyagriva - brown argus
- Dallacha hyagriva nepalica
- Dallacha narasingha narasingha - mottled argus
- Callerebia annada caeca - ringed argus
- Callerebia hybrida - hybrid argus
- Callerebia scanda opima - pallid argus
- Callerebia nirmala nirmala - common argus
- Paralasa nepalica - Nepal argus

==== Tribe Coenonymphini ====
- Coenonympha amaryllis forsteri - Mustang heath

==== Tribe Maniolini ====
- Hyponephele lupinus cheerna - branded meadow brown

==== Tribe Satyrini ====
- Aulocera brahminus dokwana - narrow-banded satyr
- Aulocera padma padma - great satyr
- Aulocera loha - Doherty's satyr
- Aulocera swaha - common satyr
- Aulocera swaha gauena
- Aulocera saraswati - striated satyr
- Hipparchia parisatis - mountain satyr
- Paroeneis pumilus grandis - mountain satyr
- Paroeneis sikkimensis - Sikkim mountain satyr

=== Subfamily Danainae ===
==== Tribe Danaini ====
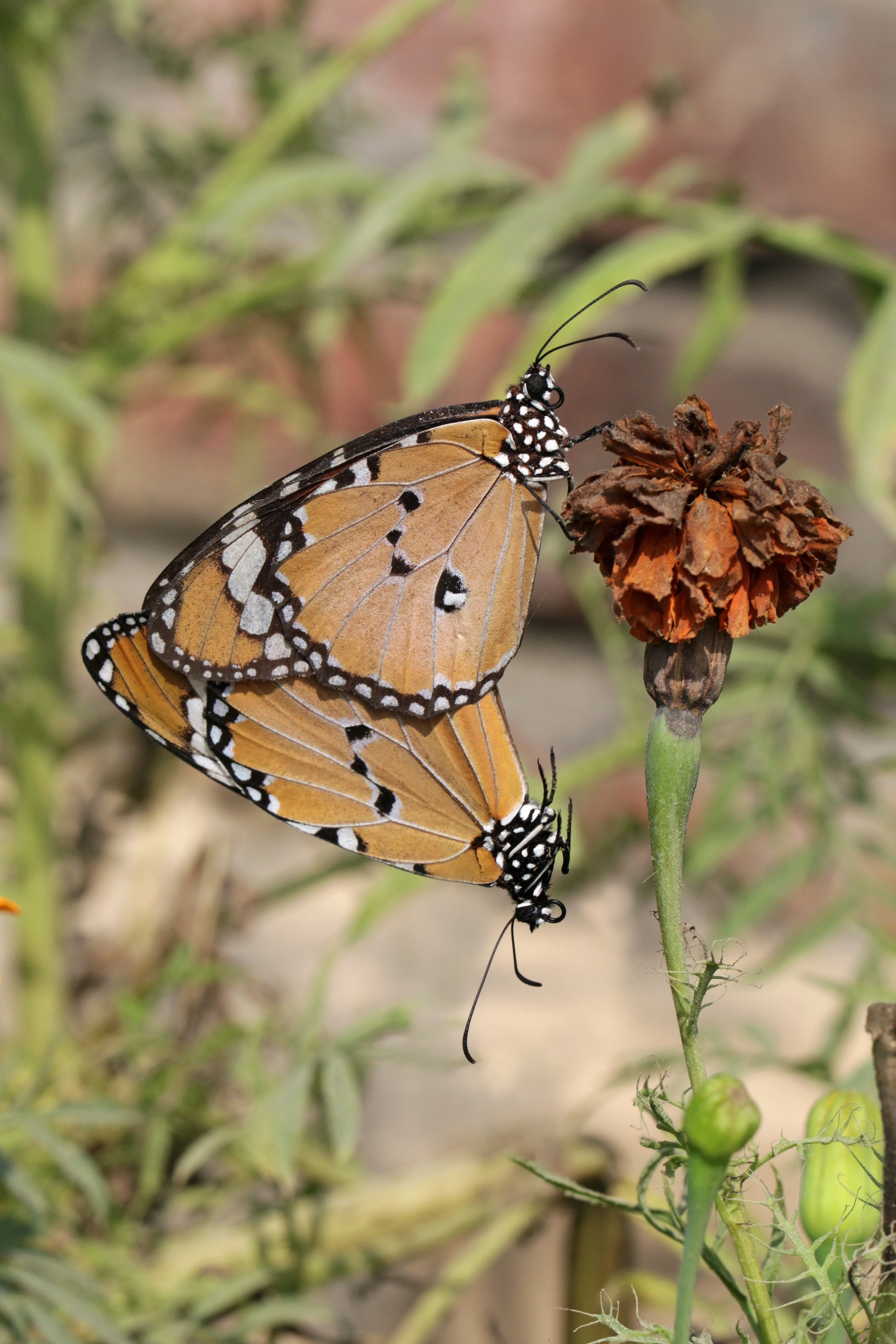
Plain tiger Danaus chrysippus chrysippus mating

- Danaus chrysippus chrysippus - plain tiger
- Danaus genutia - common tiger
- Danaus genutia nipalensis
- Tirumala limniace exoticus - blue tiger
- Tirumala septentrionis - dark blue tiger (endemic)
- Parantica aglea melanoides - glassy tiger
- Parantica melaneus plataniston - chocolate tiger
- Parantica sita sita - chestnut tiger (endemic)
- Parantica pedonga - Talbot's chestnut tiger (endemic)
- Euploea midamus rogenhoferi - blue-spotted crow
- Euploea diocletianus ramsayi - magpie crow
- Euploea klugii klugii - blue king crow
- Euploea klugii kollari - brown king crow
- Euploea mulciber mulciber - striped blue crow
- Euploea sylvester hopei - double-branded blue crow
- Euploea core core - common Indian crow
- Euploea algea deione - long-branded blue crow

== See also ==
- List of moths of Nepal (Bombycidae)
- List of moths of Nepal (Brahmaeidae)
- List of moths of Nepal (Drepanidae)
- List of moths of Nepal (Eupterotidae)
- List of moths of Nepal (Lasiocampidae)
- List of moths of Nepal (Limacodidae)
- List of moths of Nepal (Saturniidae)
- List of moths of Nepal (Sphingidae)
- List of moths of Nepal (Uraniidae)
- List of moths of Nepal (Zygaenidae)
- List of beetles of Nepal (Cerambycidae)
- List of beetles of Nepal (Coccinellidae)
- List of bugs of Nepal (Scutelleridae)
- List of Odonata of Nepal
- Wildlife of Nepal
