= Melanolycaena =

Scientific classification
- Domain: Eukaryota
- Kingdom: Animalia
- Phylum: Arthropoda
- Class: Insecta
- Order: Lepidoptera
- Family: Lycaenidae
- Tribe: Heliophorini
- Genus: Melanolycaena; Sibatani, 1974

Butterfly genus in family Lycaenidae

Melanolycaena is a genus of butterflies in the family Lycaenidae.
