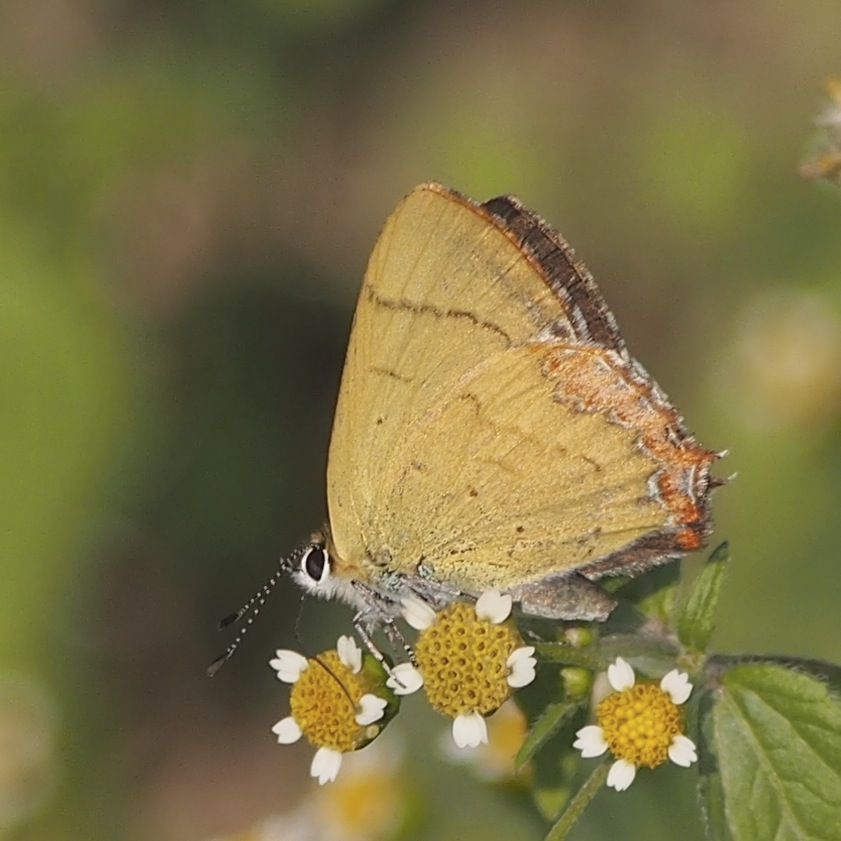

Scientific classification
- Kingdom: Animalia
- Phylum: Arthropoda
- Class: Insecta
- Order: Lepidoptera
- Family: Lycaenidae
- Genus: Heliophorus
- Species: H. androcles

Binomial name
- Heliophorus androcles (Westwood 1851)

= Heliophorus androcles =

Green sapphire

Species of butterfly

Heliophorus androcles, the green sapphire, is a small butterfly found in India (mainly the part of NE India) and Nepal that belongs to the lycaenids or blues family.

== See also ==
- List of butterflies of India
- List of butterflies of India (Lycaenidae)
