= Phoenicurusia =

Scientific classification
- Domain: Eukaryota
- Kingdom: Animalia
- Phylum: Arthropoda
- Class: Insecta
- Order: Lepidoptera
- Family: Lycaenidae
- Subfamily: Lycaeninae
- Genus: Phoenicurusia; Verity, 1943

Synonyms
- Margelycaena Koçak & Kemal, 2001

Butterfly genus in family Lycaenidae

Phoenicurusia is a genus of butterflies in the family Lycaenidae.
