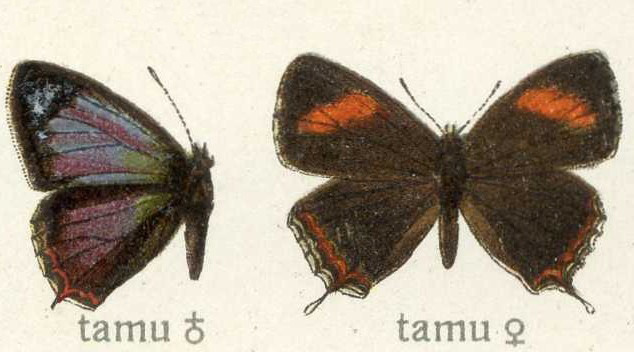
- Male on left, from Adalbert Seitz

Scientific classification
- Domain: Eukaryota
- Kingdom: Animalia
- Phylum: Arthropoda
- Class: Insecta
- Order: Lepidoptera
- Family: Lycaenidae
- Genus: Heliophorus
- Species: H. tamu

Binomial name
- Heliophorus tamu (Kollar 1848)

= Heliophorus tamu =

Powdery green sapphire

Species of butterfly

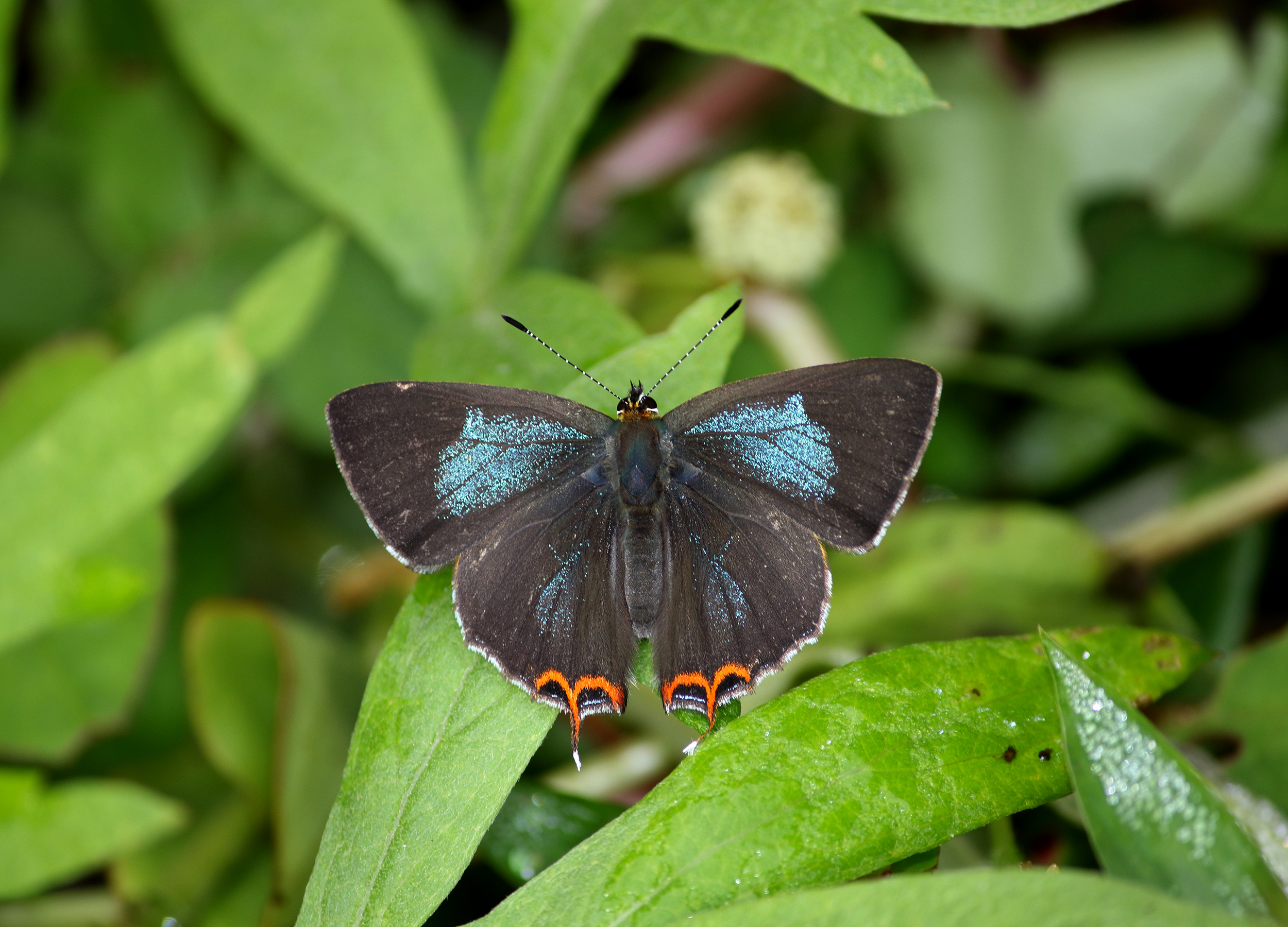
Open wing position of male Heliophorus tamu – powdery green sapphire

Heliophorus tamu, the powdery green sapphire, is a small butterfly found in India that belongs to the lycaenids or blues family.

== See also ==
- List of butterflies of India
- List of butterflies of India (Lycaenidae)
