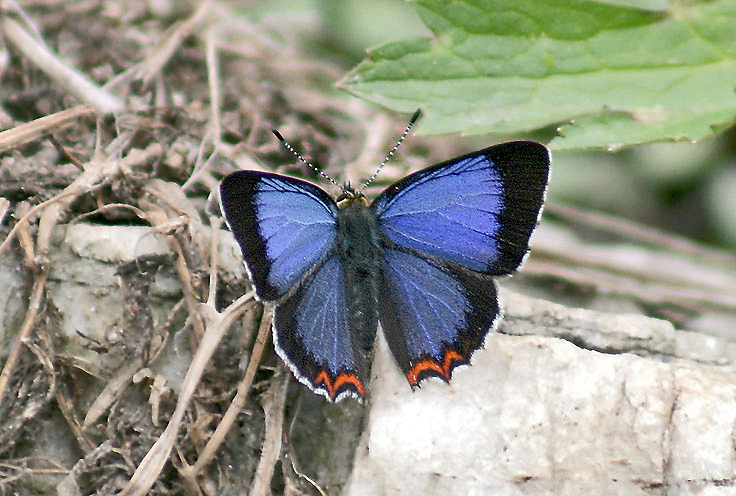

Scientific classification
- Kingdom: Animalia
- Phylum: Arthropoda
- Class: Insecta
- Order: Lepidoptera
- Family: Lycaenidae
- Genus: Heliophorus
- Species: H. bakeri

Binomial name
- Heliophorus bakeri Evans 1927

= Heliophorus bakeri =

Western blue sapphire

Species of butterfly

Heliophorus bakeri, the western blue sapphire, is a small butterfly found in India that belongs to the lycaenids or blues family.

== See also ==
- Lycaenidae
- List of butterflies of India
- List of butterflies of India (Lycaenidae)
