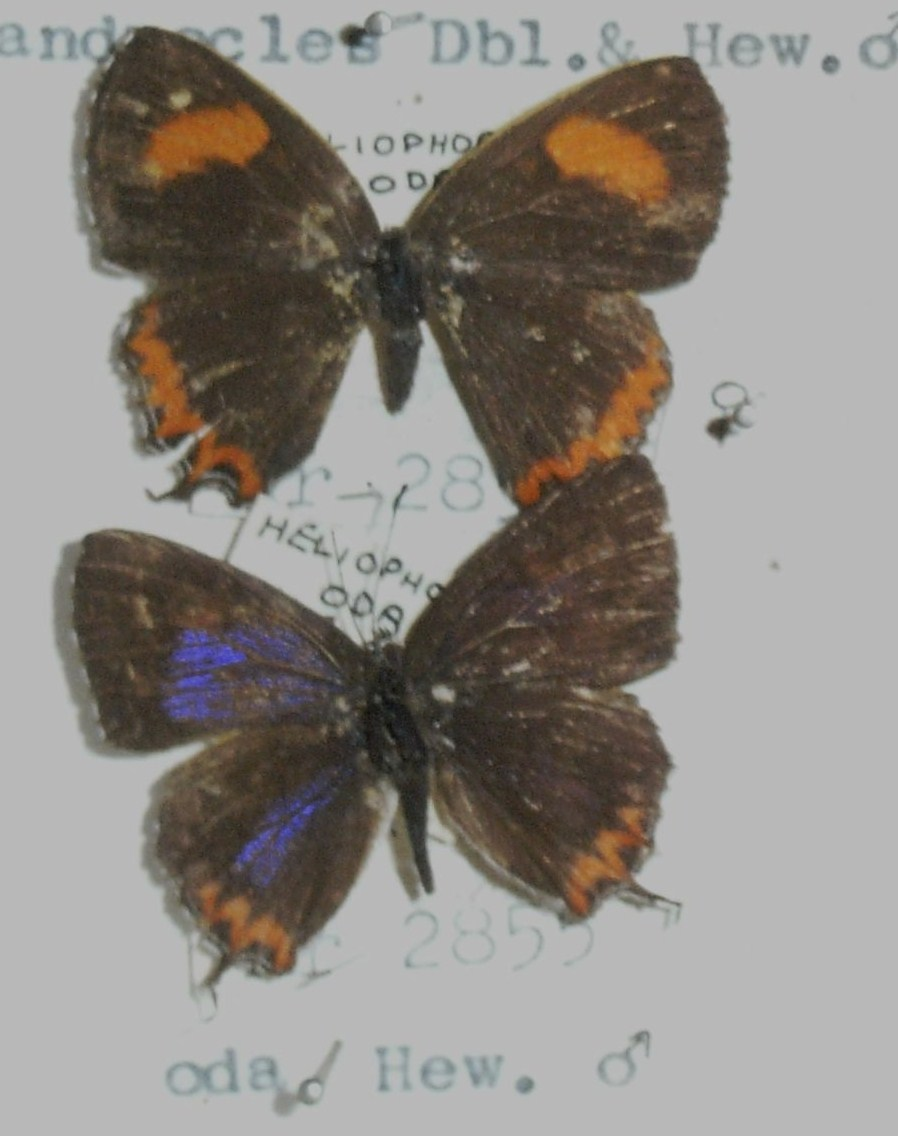
- Female above, male below

Scientific classification
- Kingdom: Animalia
- Phylum: Arthropoda
- Class: Insecta
- Order: Lepidoptera
- Family: Lycaenidae
- Genus: Heliophorus
- Species: H. oda

Binomial name
- Heliophorus oda (Hewitson 1865)

= Heliophorus oda =

Eastern blue sapphire

Species of butterfly

Heliophorus oda, the eastern blue sapphire, is a small butterfly found in India that belongs to the lycaenids or blues family.

== See also ==
- List of butterflies of India
- List of butterflies of India (Lycaenidae)
