= Hyrcanana =

Scientific classification
- Domain: Eukaryota
- Kingdom: Animalia
- Phylum: Arthropoda
- Class: Insecta
- Order: Lepidoptera
- Family: Lycaenidae
- Subfamily: Lycaeninae
- Genus: Hyrcanana; Bethune-Baker, 1914

Synonyms
- Sarthusia Verity, 1943

Butterfly genus in family Lycaenidae

Hyrcanana is a genus of butterflies in the family Lycaenidae.

== Species ==
- Hyrcanana caspius (Lederer, 1869)
- Hyrcanana ophion Hemming, 1933
- Hyrcanana sartha (Staudinger, 1886)
