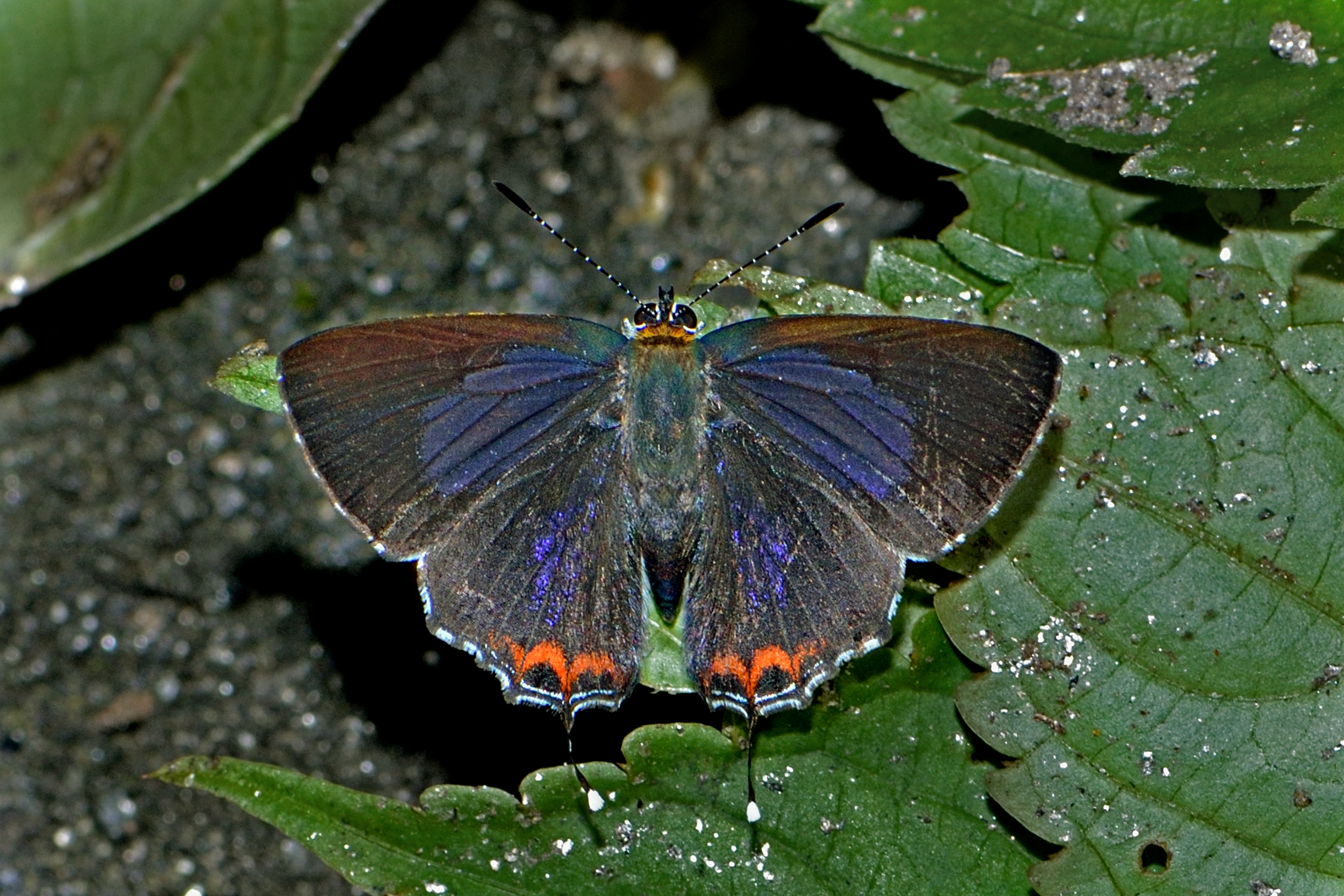

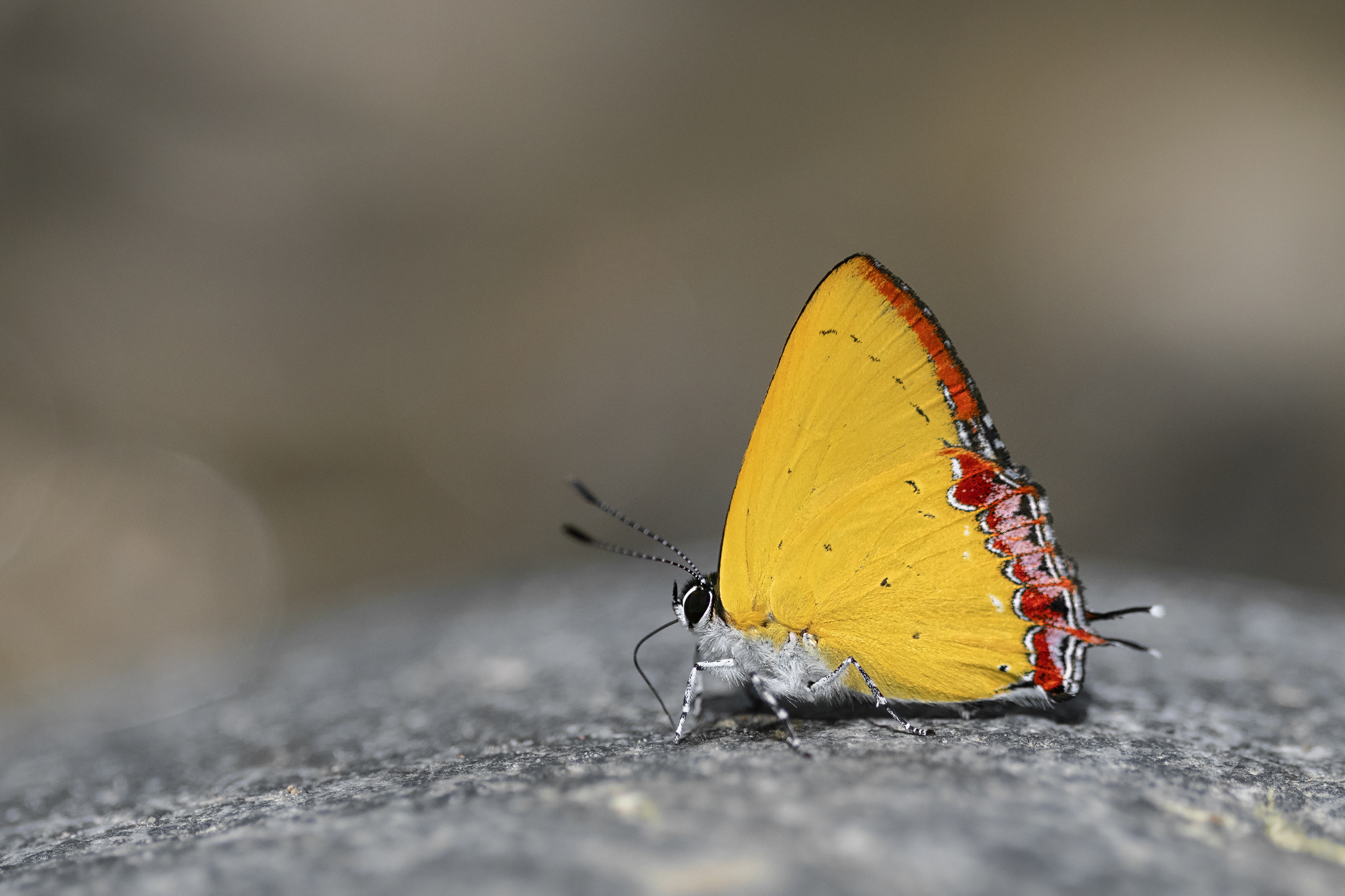

Scientific classification
- Domain: Eukaryota
- Kingdom: Animalia
- Phylum: Arthropoda
- Class: Insecta
- Order: Lepidoptera
- Family: Lycaenidae
- Genus: Heliophorus
- Species: H. indicus

Binomial name
- Heliophorus indicus (Fruhstorfer, 1908)

= Heliophorus indicus =

Indian purple sapphire

Species of butterfly

Heliophorus indicus, the Indian purple sapphire, is a small butterfly found in India that belongs to the lycaenids or blues family. The species was first described by Hans Fruhstorfer in 1908.

== See also ==
- List of butterflies of India
- List of butterflies of India (Lycaenidae)
