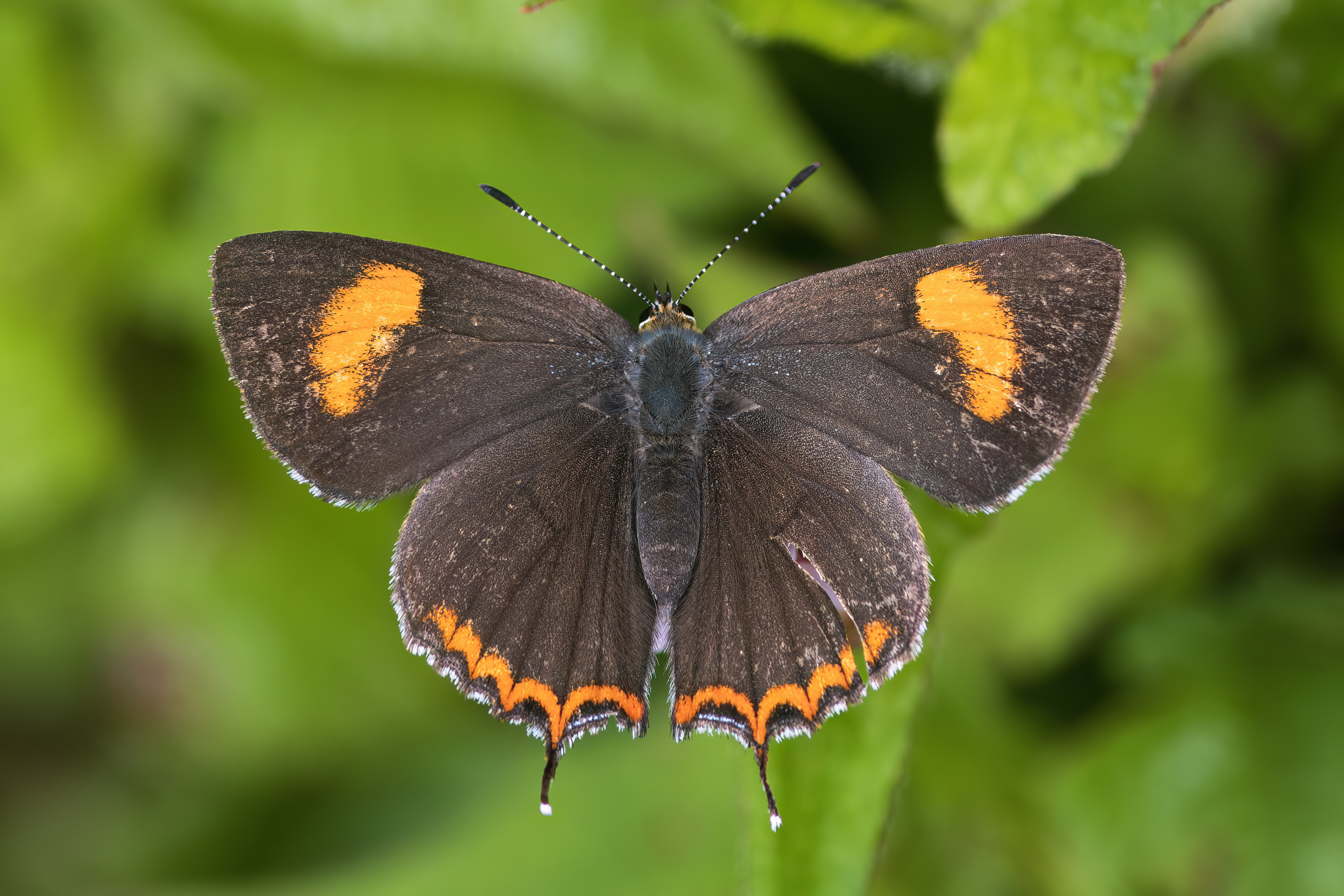
- From Dochula Pass

Scientific classification
- Kingdom: Animalia
- Phylum: Arthropoda
- Class: Insecta
- Order: Lepidoptera
- Family: Lycaenidae
- Genus: Heliophorus
- Species: H. epicles

Binomial name
- Heliophorus epicles Godart 1823

= Heliophorus epicles =

Purple sapphire

Species of butterfly

Heliophorus epicles, commonly known as the purple sapphire, is a species of lycaenid or blue butterfly found in Asia. The species was first described by Jean Baptiste Godart in 1823.

== Subspecies ==
The subspecies of Heliophorus epicles are:

- Heliophorus epicles epicles Fruhstorfer, 1918 – western Java
- Heliophorus epicles hilima Fruhstorfer, 1912 – eastern Java
- Heliophorus epicles latilimbata Fruhstorfer, 1908 – Nepal, Sikkim, Bhutan, Assam, Myanmar, Andamans, Thailand, Laos, Vietnam, southern Yunnan
- Heliophorus epicles tweediei Eliot, 1963 – Peninsular Malaya
- Heliophorus epicles sumatrensis Fruhstorfer, 1908 – Sumatra
- Heliophorus epicles phoenicoparyphus Holland, 1887 – Hainan

== Distribution ==
In India, this butterfly can only be traced in the Himalayas at 2000–7000 ft (600–2100 m). Apart from that they can be found from Kumaon in the Himalayas to southern Myanmar. They mainly inhabit in dense forest region.

== Gallery ==
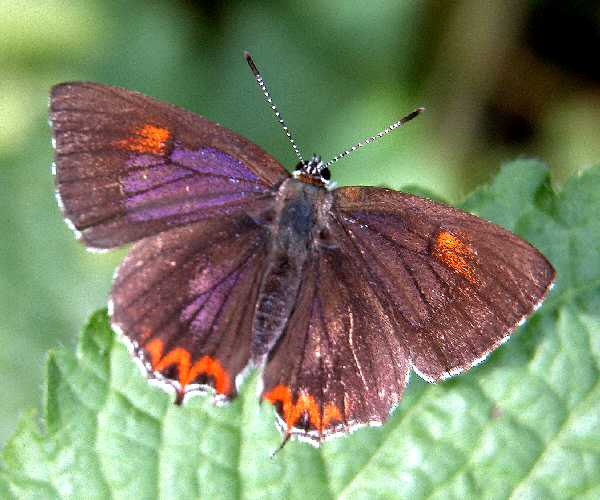
In Uttar Pradesh, India

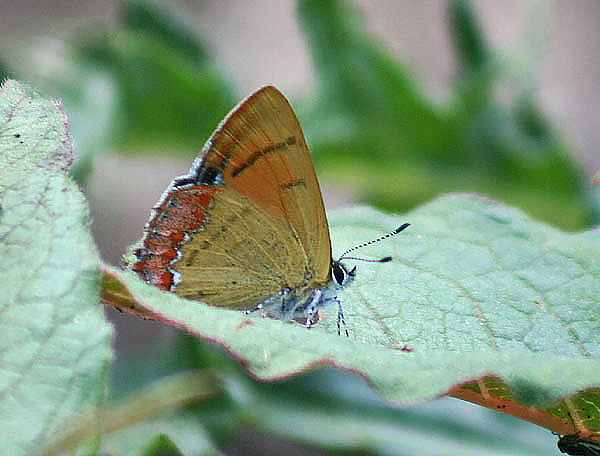
In Himachal Pradesh, India

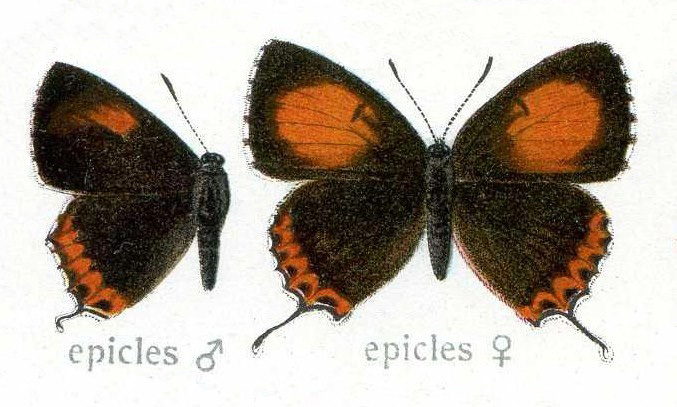
Male on left, female right

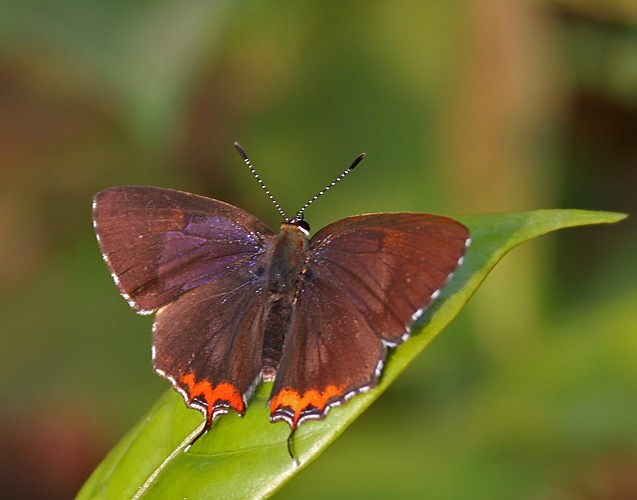
Male at Samsing in Darjeeling district of West Bengal, India

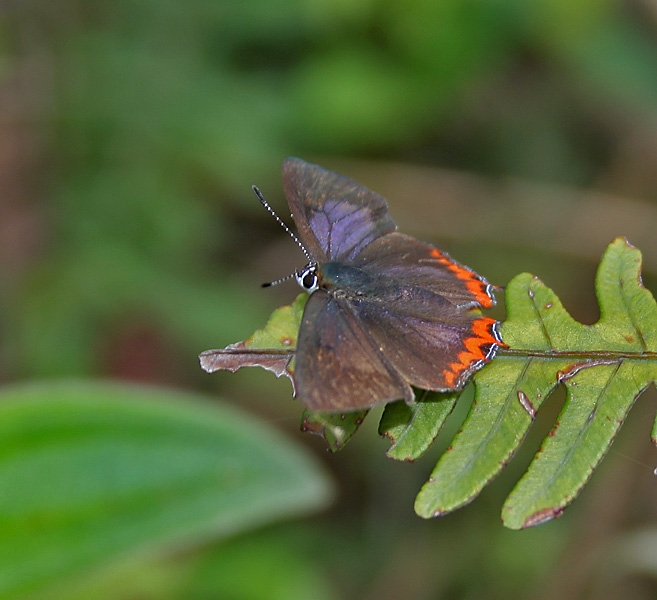
Male at Samsing

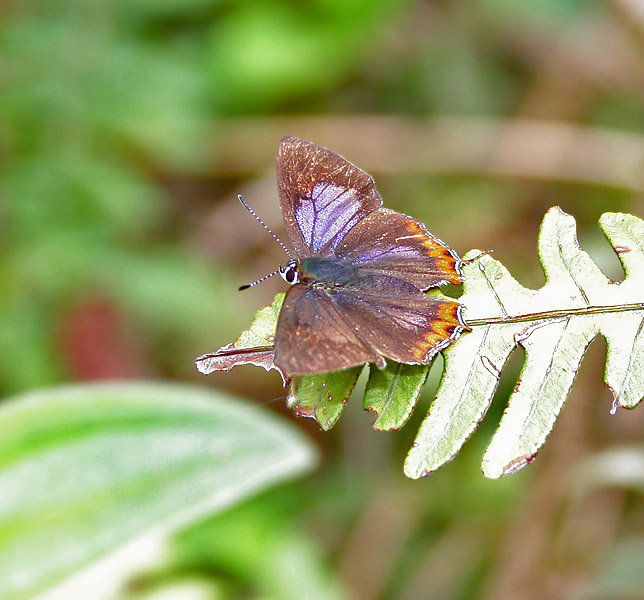
Male at Samsing

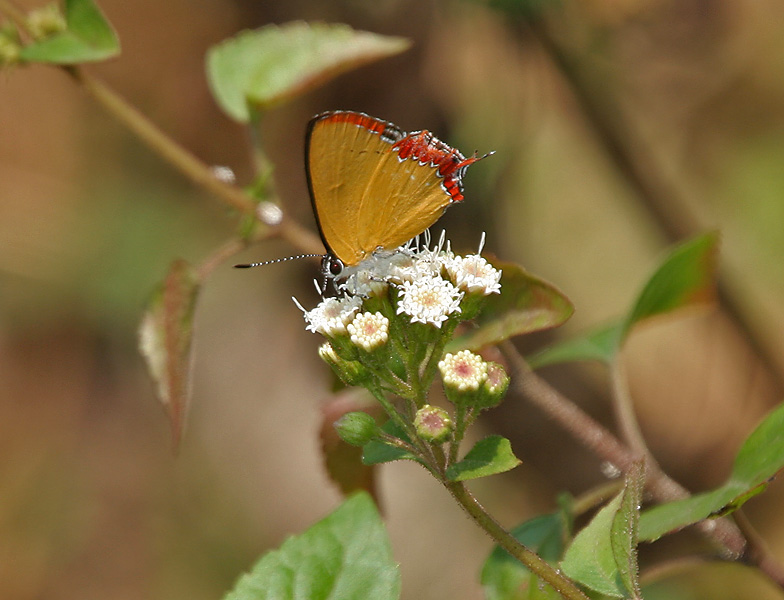
Male at Samsing

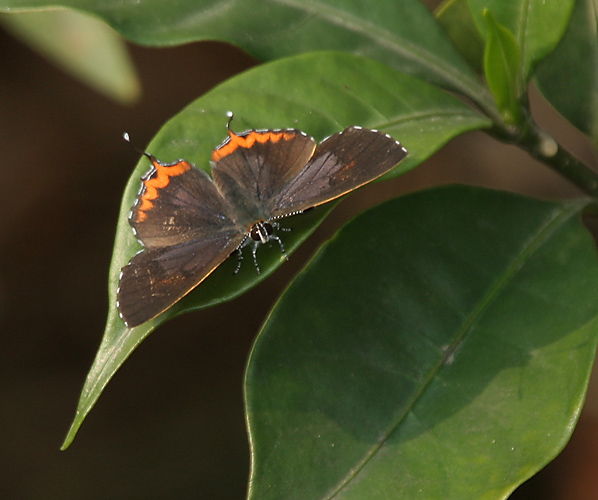
Male at Samsing

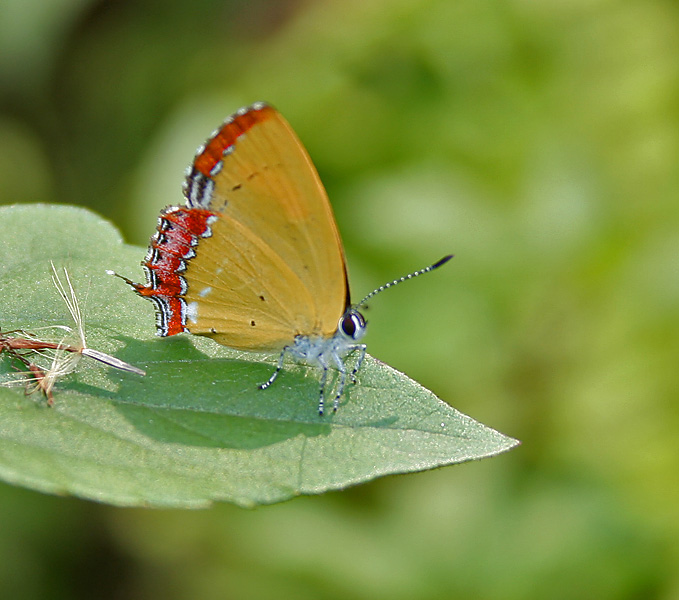
Female at Samsing

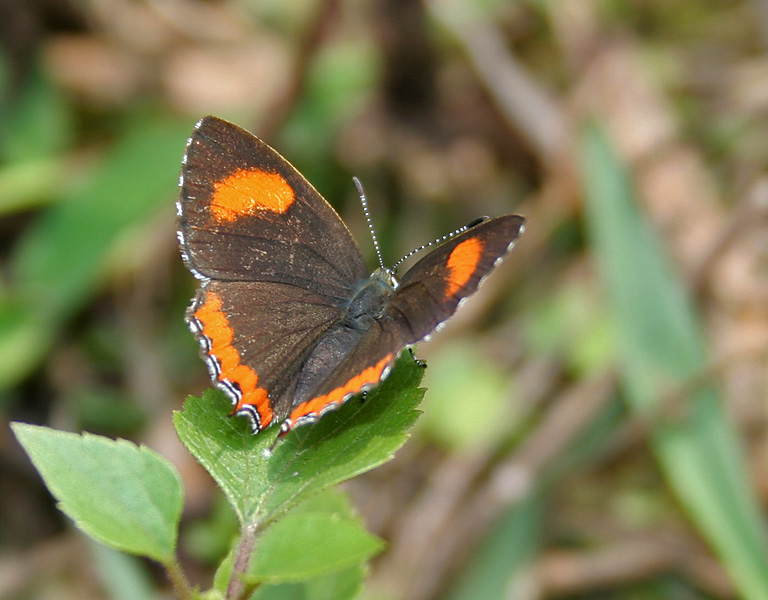
Female at Samsing

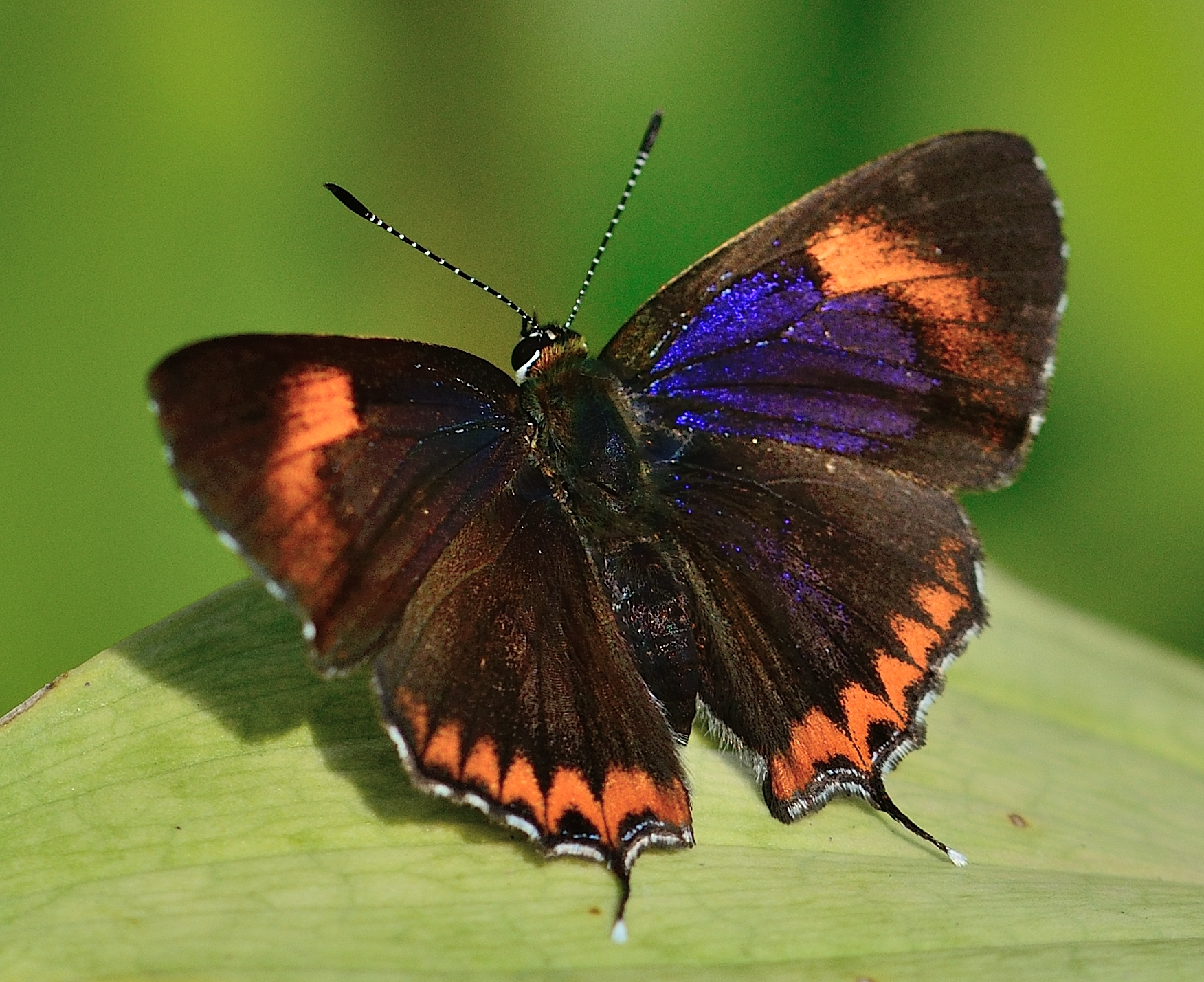
Cameron Highlands, Malaysia

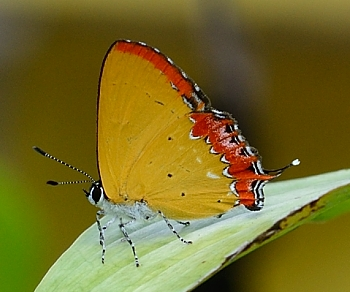
Cameron Highlands, Malaysia

== See also ==
- List of butterflies of India
- List of butterflies of India (Lycaenidae)
