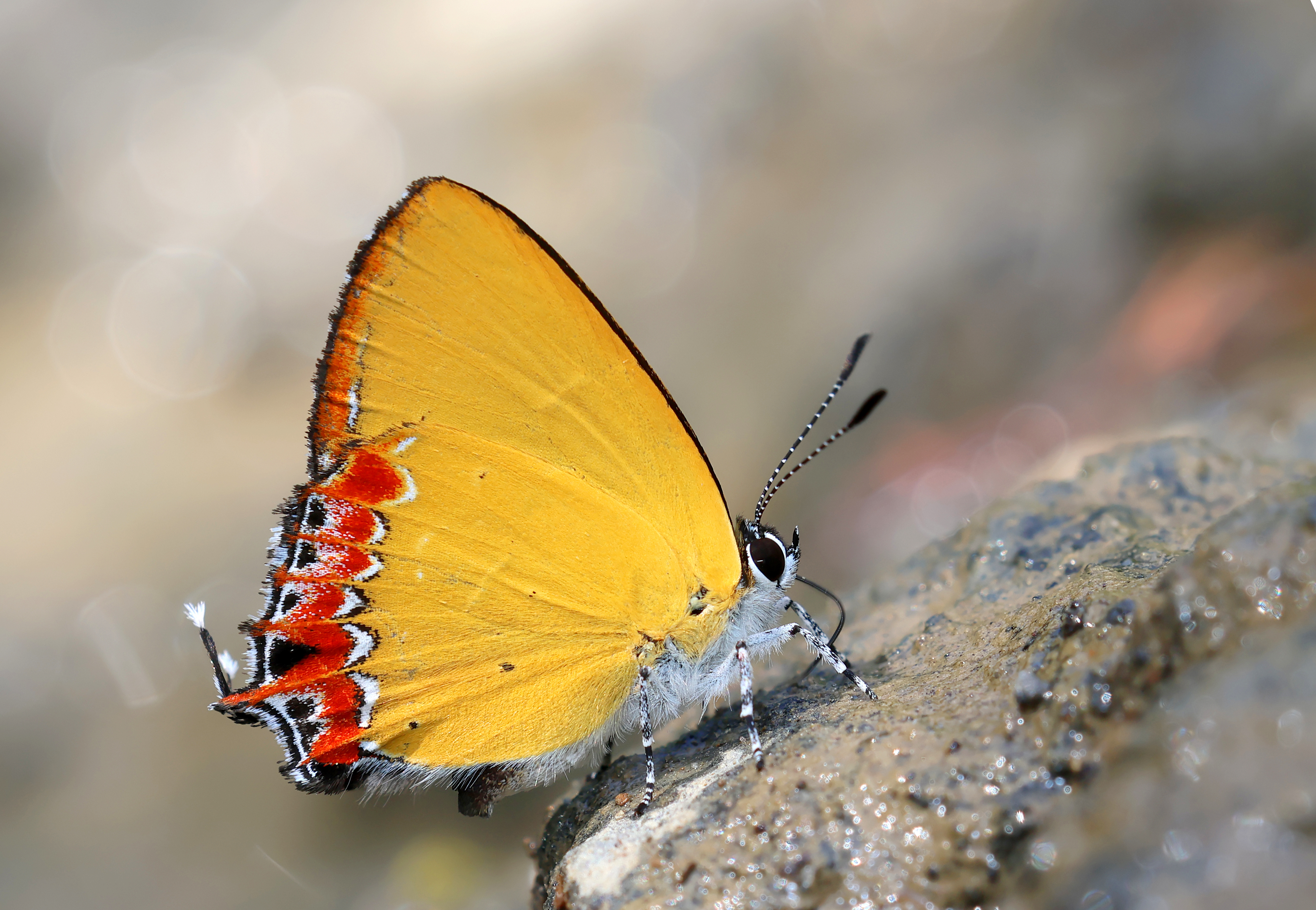

Scientific classification
- Kingdom: Animalia
- Phylum: Arthropoda
- Class: Insecta
- Order: Lepidoptera
- Family: Lycaenidae
- Genus: Heliophorus
- Species: H. kohimensis

Binomial name
- Heliophorus kohimensis (Tytler 1912)

= Heliophorus kohimensis =

Naga sapphire

Species of butterfly

Heliophorus kohimensis, the Naga sapphire, is a small butterfly found in India that belongs to the lycaenids or blues family.

== See also ==
- List of butterflies of India
- List of butterflies of India (Lycaenidae)
