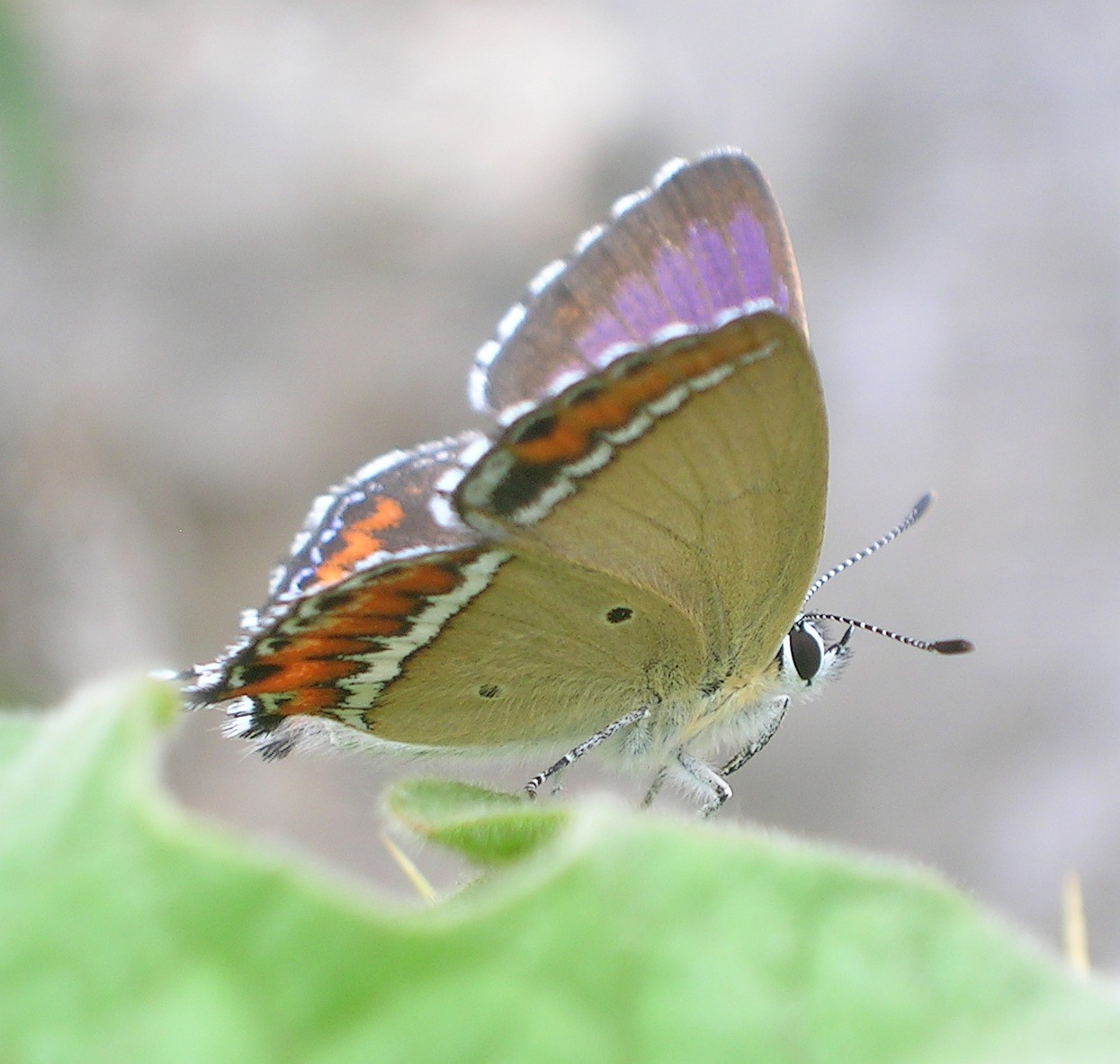

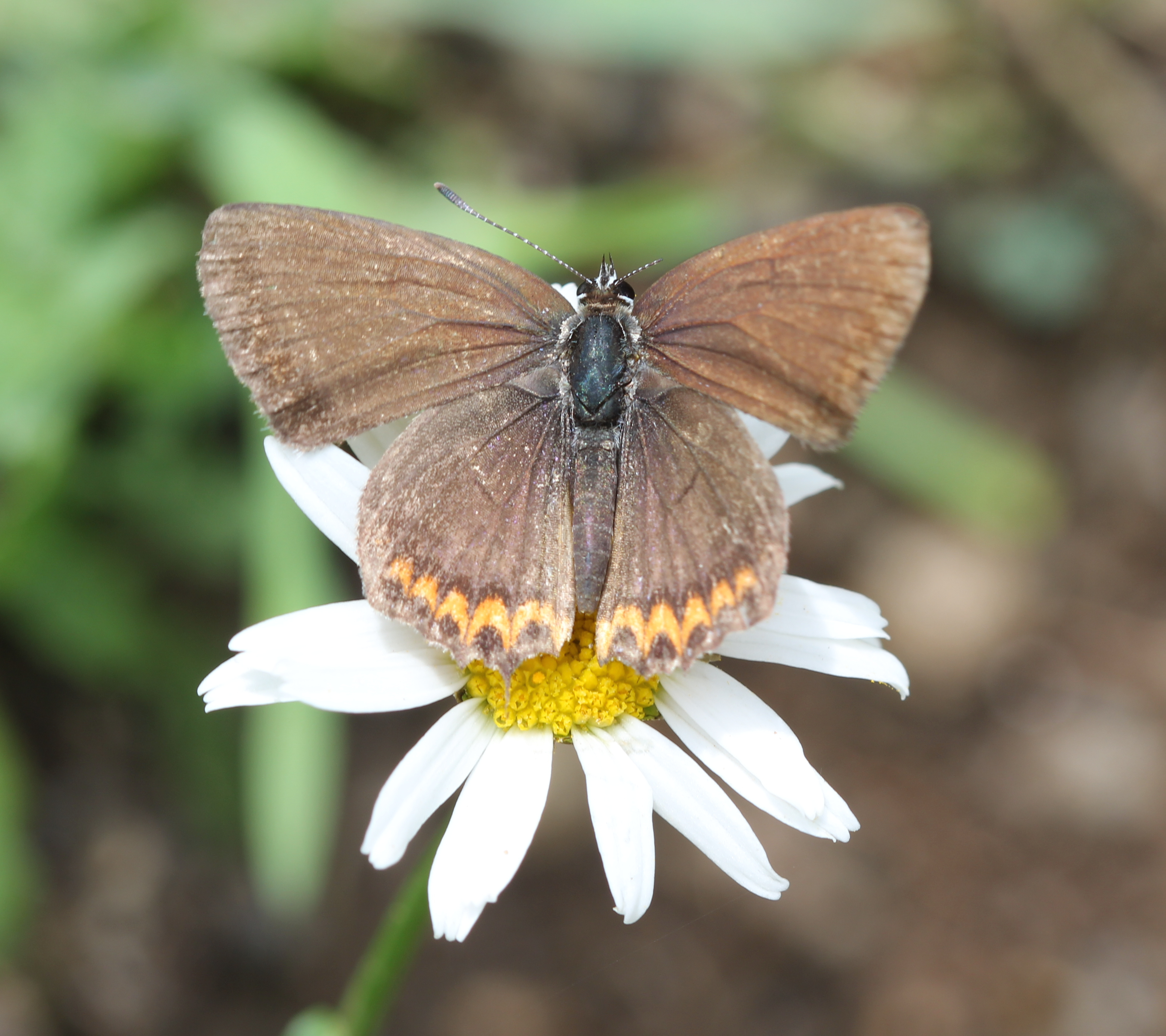

Scientific classification
- Kingdom: Animalia
- Phylum: Arthropoda
- Class: Insecta
- Order: Lepidoptera
- Family: Lycaenidae
- Genus: Heliophorus
- Species: H. sena

Binomial name
- Heliophorus sena (Kollar, 1844)

= Heliophorus sena =

Sorrel sapphire

Species of butterfly

Heliophorus sena, the sorrel sapphire, is a small butterfly found in India that belongs to the lycaenids or blues family.

== See also ==
- List of butterflies of India
- List of butterflies of India (Lycaenidae)
