= Athamanthia phoenicura =

Scientific classification
- Kingdom: Animalia
- Phylum: Arthropoda
- Clade: Pancrustacea
- Class: Insecta
- Order: Lepidoptera
- Family: Lycaenidae
- Genus: Athamanthia
- Species: A. phoenicura

Binomial name
- Athamanthia phoenicura (Lederer, [1870])

Synonyms
- Polyommatus phoenicurus Lederer [1870]; Tharsalea (Phoenicurusia) phoenicurus (Lederer, [1870]); Sibatani, 1974; Lycaena phoenicurus (Lederer, [1870]); Nekrutenko & Effendi, 1983; Lycaena melicertes Nekrutenko, 1985; Polyommatus scintillans Christoph, 1887; Lycaena (Phoenicurusia) phoenicurus athamantides Eckweiler & Hagen, 2001; Lycaena (Phoenicurusia) phoenicurus monalisa Eckweiler, 2004

Species of butterfly

Athamanthia phoenicura is a butterfly of the family Lycaenidae. It was described by Julius Lederer in 1870 and is found in Armenia, Turkmenistan, Turkey, Iran, Afghanistan, Pakistan.

The wingspan is 26–28 mm. The species inhabits semi-deserts between 300 and 1400 m above sea level. The host plant of the species is Atraphaxis spinosa. The butterfly flies from May to June.

The larvae have been recorded feeding on Atraphaxis spinosa.

== Subspecies ==
- Athamanthia phoenicura athamantides (Eckweiler & Hagen, 2001)* (Iran)
- Athamanthia phoenicura monalisa (Eckweiler, 2004) (Iran)
- Athamanthia phoenicura phoenicura (Lederer, [1870]) (Armenia, Afghanistan, Azerbaijan, Turkey, Iran, Pakistan, etc)

See also [potentially as distinct species]

- Athamanthia phoenicura transcaucasica (Miller, 1923) (Armenia, Azerbaijan, Turkey)

Notes: [* Elsewhere as Athamanthia balucha athamantides ]
