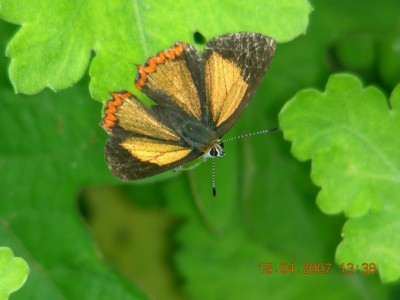
- On Chrysanthemum in Algarah, West Bengal, India

Scientific classification
- Domain: Eukaryota
- Kingdom: Animalia
- Phylum: Arthropoda
- Class: Insecta
- Order: Lepidoptera
- Family: Lycaenidae
- Genus: Heliophorus
- Species: H. brahma

Binomial name
- Heliophorus brahma (Moore, 1857)

= Heliophorus brahma =

Golden sapphire

Species of butterfly

Heliophorus brahma, the golden sapphire, is a small butterfly found in India that belongs to the lycaenids or blues family. The species was first described by Frederic Moore in 1857.

== See also ==
- List of butterflies of India
- List of butterflies of India (Lycaenidae)
