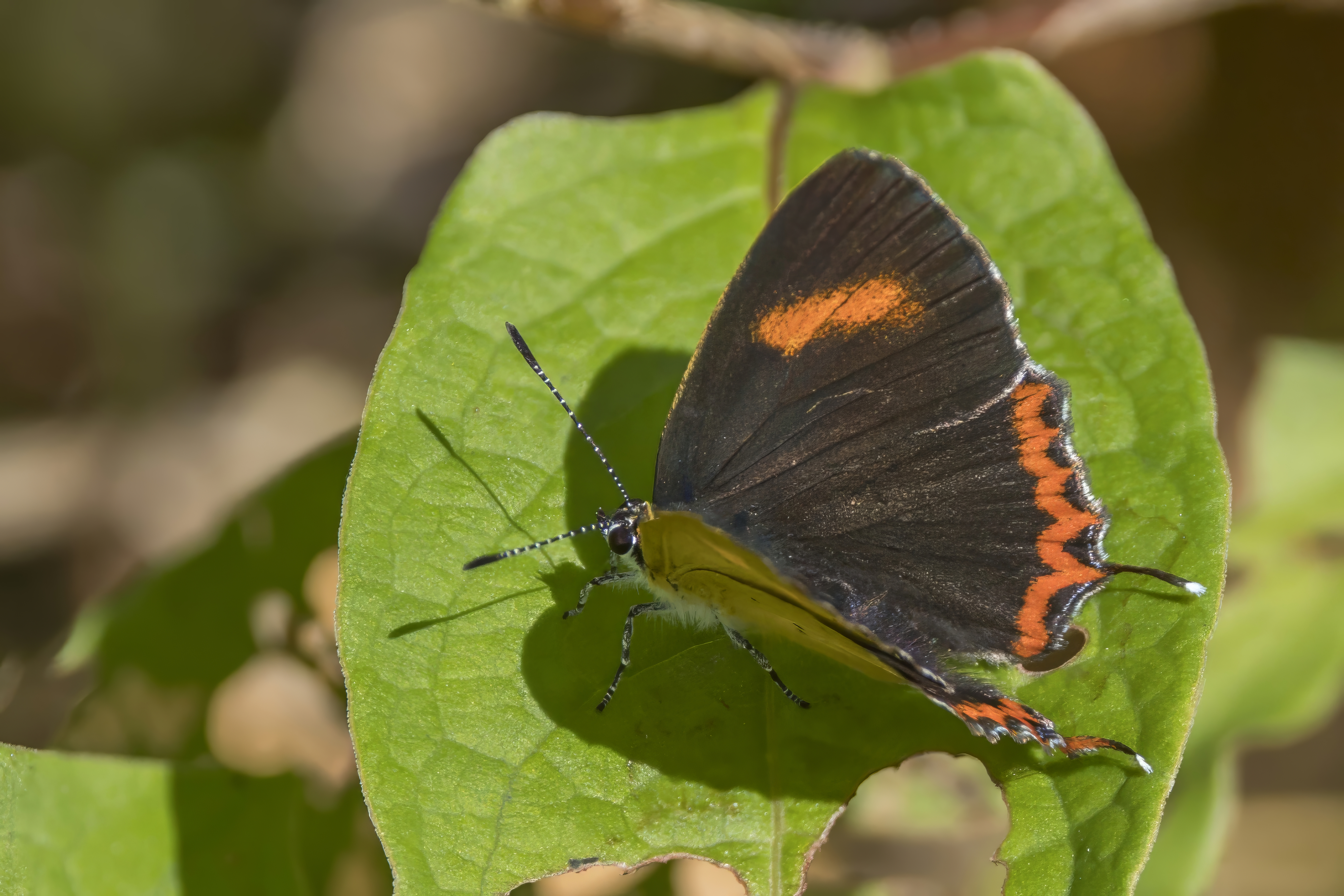
- female H. i. matsumurae, Taiwan

Scientific classification
- Kingdom: Animalia
- Phylum: Arthropoda
- Class: Insecta
- Order: Lepidoptera
- Family: Lycaenidae
- Tribe: Heliophorini
- Genus: Heliophorus; Geyer, 1832

Species
- 19, see text

Synonyms
- Ilerda Doubleday, 1847; Nesa Zhdanko, 1995; Kulua Zhdanko, 1995

= Heliophorus =

Butterfly genus in family Lycaenidae

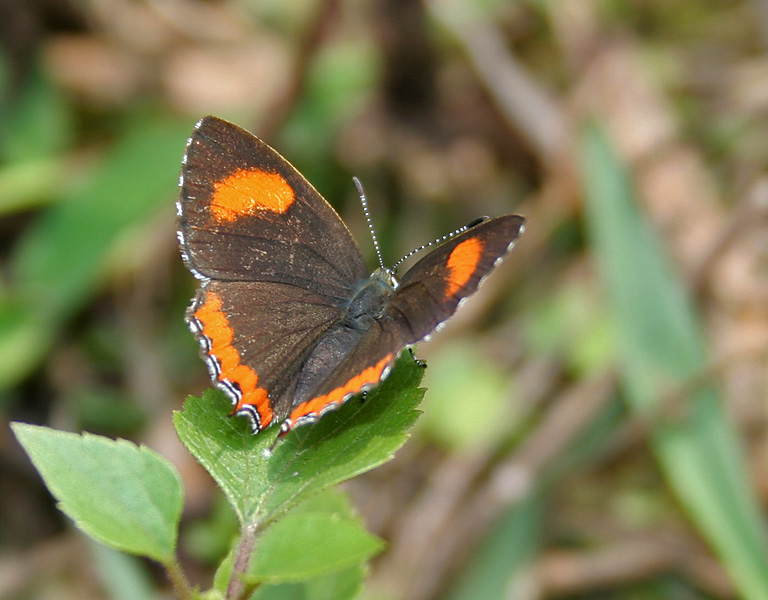
Female H. epicles, West Bengal, India

Heliophorus is a genus of lycaenid butterflies. It is distributed in tropical Asia.

== Species ==
There are 19 recognized species:

- Heliophorus androcles (Westwood)
- Heliophorus bakeri Evans, 1927
- Heliophorus brahma (Moore, 1857)
- Heliophorus cantliei Eliot, 1965
- Heliophorus coruscans (Moore, 1882)
- Heliophorus epicles (Godart, 1823)
- Heliophorus ila (de Nicéville, 1896)
- Heliophorus indicus (Fruhstorfer, 1908)
- Heliophorus kohimensis (Tytler, 1912)
- Heliophorus langi (Moore, 1883)
- Heliophorus nagaensis Riley, 1929
- Heliophorus nexus Eliot
- Heliophorus oda (Hewitson, 1865)
- Heliophorus saphir (Blanchard, 1871)
- Heliophorus sena (Kollar, 1844)
- Heliophorus stotzneri (Draeseke, 1925)
- Heliophorus tamu (Kollar, 1848)
- Heliophorus viridipunctata (de Nicéville, 1890)
- Heliophorus vulgaris Riley
