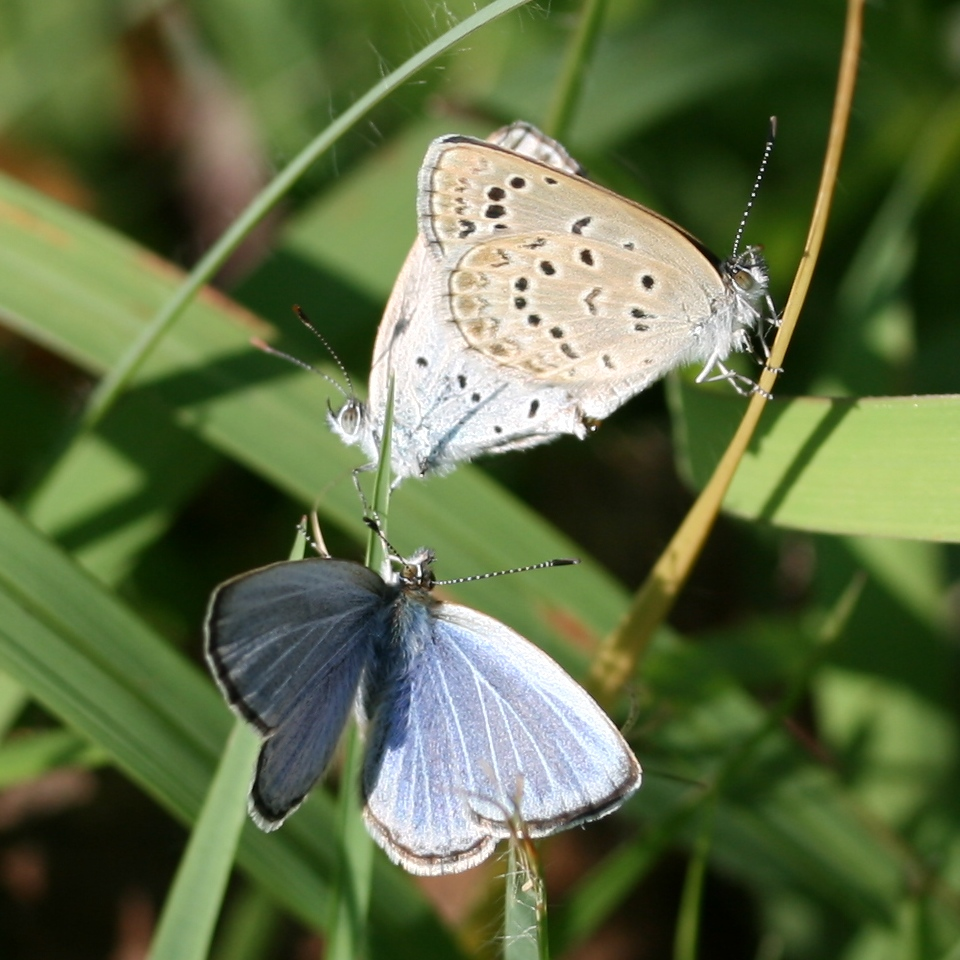
- Pseudozizeeria maha

Scientific classification
- Domain: Eukaryota
- Kingdom: Animalia
- Phylum: Arthropoda
- Class: Insecta
- Order: Lepidoptera
- Family: Lycaenidae
- Subfamily: Polyommatinae
- Tribe: Polyommatini
- Genus: Pseudozizeeria; Beuret, 1955

= Pseudozizeeria =

Monotypic butterfly genus in family Lycaenidae

Pseudozizeeria is a genus of butterflies in the family Lycaenidae. This genus is monotypic, consisting of only one species, Pseudozizeeria maha, which is found in the Indomalayan and Palearctic realms.
