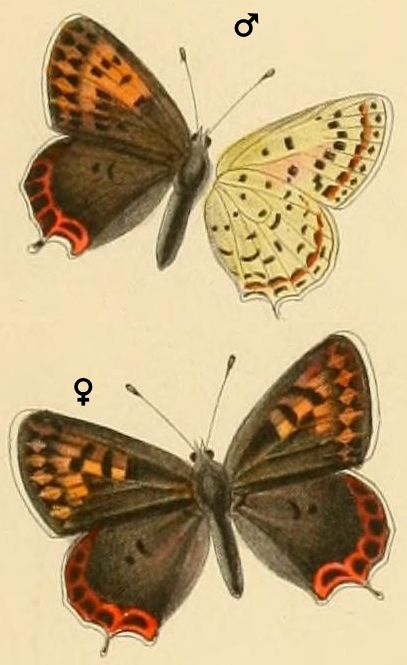
- Athamanthia dimorpha

Scientific classification
- Domain: Eukaryota
- Kingdom: Animalia
- Phylum: Arthropoda
- Class: Insecta
- Order: Lepidoptera
- Family: Lycaenidae
- Subfamily: Lycaeninae
- Genus: Athamanthia; Zhdanko, 1983

= Athamanthia =

Butterfly genus in family Lycaenidae

Athamanthia is an Eastern Palearctic genus of butterfly in the family Lycaenidae. Athamanthia is differentiated from Lycaena by characters of the male genitalia.

== Species ==
- Athamanthia athamantis (Eversmann, 1854) Turan, Dzhungarsky Alatau
- Athamanthia rushanica Zhdanko, 1990 western Pamirs, Turan, Gissar Range
- Athamanthia sogdiana Zhdanko, 1990 southern Turkmenistan (Badhyz State Nature Reserve), southern Gissar Range
- Athamanthia churkini Zhdanko, 2000 Keke-Meren River, Kirghizia 1650 m
- Athamanthia phoenicura (Lederer, [1870]) Turkmenia (Kopet Dag), southern Armenia, Turkey, Iran, Azerbaijan, Afghanistan, Pakistan
- Athamanthia dimorpha (Staudinger, 1881) northern Iran, northern and western Tian-Shan, Dzhungarsky Alatau, Saur Mountains, Tarbagatai Mountains, southern Altay Mountains, Kazakhstan, Uzbekistan, southwestern Mongolia
- Athamanthia japhetica (Nekrutenko & Effendi, 1983) Azerbaijan
- Athamanthia issykkuli Zhdanko, 1990 Kyrgyzstan (Issyk-kul)
- Athamanthia eitschbergeri Lukhtanov, 1993 Kyrgyzstan (Issyk-Kul lake)
- Athamanthia namanganica Lukhtanov, 2000 Kyrgyzstan (Tschatkal, western Tian Shan)
- Athamanthia zhdankoi Lukhtanov, 2000 Kyrgyzstan (Sarykamysch Mountains) 1600 m
- Athamanthia dilutior (Staudinger, 1881) Kyrgyzstan
- Athamanthia alexandra (Püngeler, 1901) Uzbekistan (Nuratau Mountains), Syr Darya, Dzhungarsky Alatau
