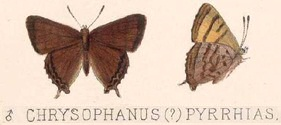
- Holotype

Scientific classification
- Domain: Eukaryota
- Kingdom: Animalia
- Phylum: Arthropoda
- Class: Insecta
- Order: Lepidoptera
- Family: Lycaenidae
- Tribe: Heliophorini
- Genus: Iophanus; Draudt, 1920
- Species: I. pyrrhias

Binomial name
- Iophanus pyrrhias (Godman & Salvin, 1887)

= Iophanus =

Monotypic butterfly genus in family Lycaenidae

Iophanus is a monotypic butterfly genus in the family Lycaenidae described by Max Wilhelm Karl Draudt in 1920. The single species of this genus, Iophanus pyrrhias, the Guatemalan copper, was described by Frederick DuCane Godman and Osbert Salvin in 1887. It is found in Guatemala, the highlands of Chiapas, Mexico, and apparently in a few other areas of the Neotropical realm.

== Description ==
Iophanus pyrrhias is a small butterfly. The hindwing ends in a short tail. The upperside is brown, with a distinct purple-metallic sheen on the males. The females are dull brown except for an iridescent blue field at the base of the forewings. Along the rear edge is an orange zigzag. The underside of the forewings is dull yellow with brown edges and brown stripes; the underside of the hindwings is brown with some darker markings.

== Bibliography ==
- Godman, F. D. & Salvin, O. 1879-1901 (1881) Biologia Centrali-Americana. London: Taylor & Francis. Vol. 2, plate LVIII.
- Heppner, J. B. 2007. "Notes on Iophanus pyrrhias in Guatemala (Lepidoptera: Lycaenidae)". Tropical Lepidoptera. 17 (1–2): 14.
- Lamas, G. 2004. Lycaeninae. pp. 137–138 in Lamas, G. (ed.) Atlas of Neotropical Lepidoptera. Checklist: Part 4A Hesperioidea - Papiionoidea. Gainesville: Scientific Publishers/Association of Tropical Lepidoptera.
