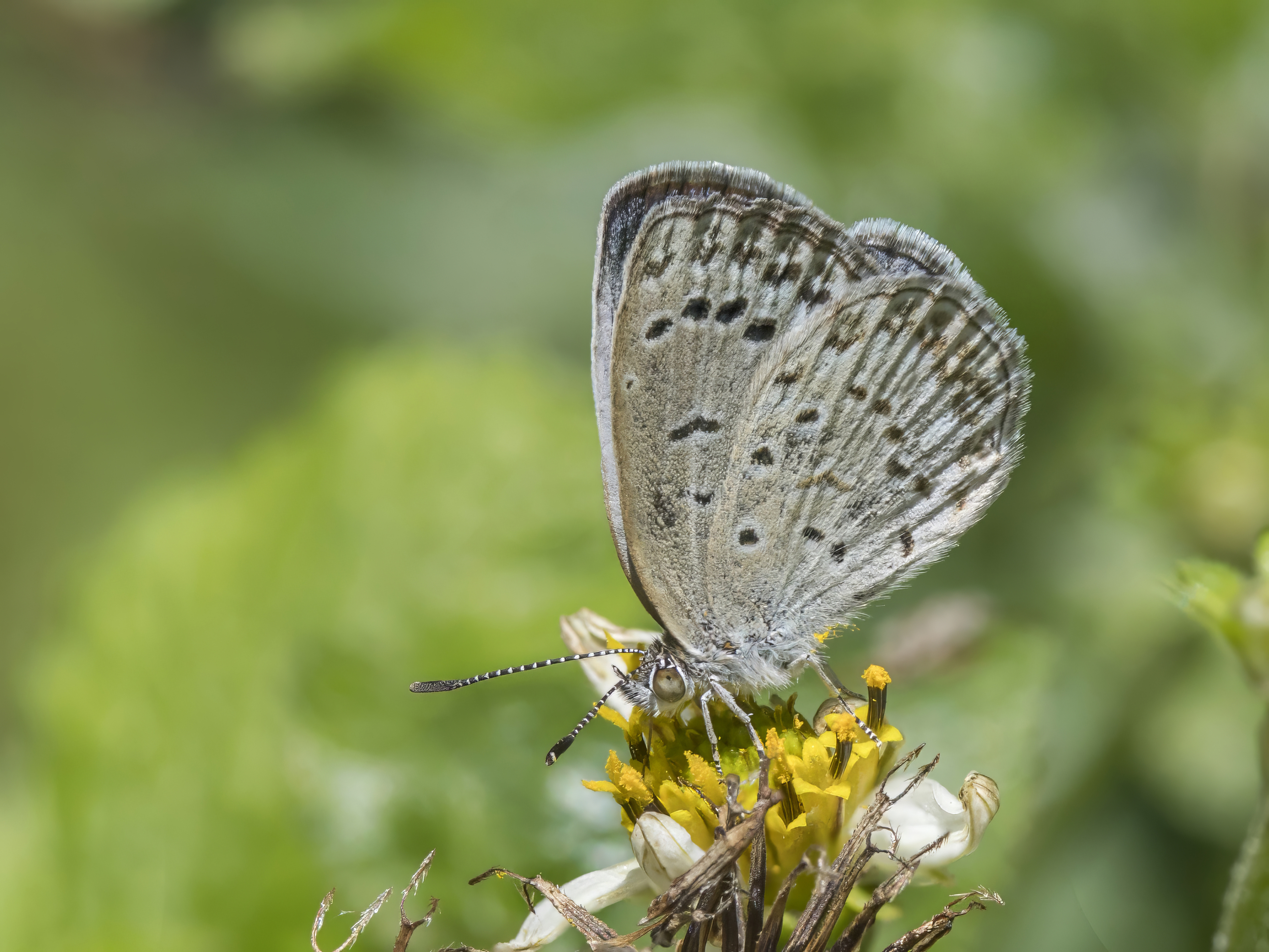
- P. m. okinawana, Taiwan

Scientific classification
- Kingdom: Animalia
- Phylum: Arthropoda
- Clade: Pancrustacea
- Class: Insecta
- Order: Lepidoptera
- Family: Lycaenidae
- Genus: Pseudozizeeria
- Species: P. maha

Binomial name
- Pseudozizeeria maha (Kollar, 1844)

Synonyms
- Zizeeria maha; Plebeius albocoeruleus Röber, 1886

= Pseudozizeeria maha =

Pale grass blue

Species of butterfly

Pseudozizeeria maha in Japan

Pseudozizeeria maha, the pale grass blue, is a small butterfly found in South Asia that belongs to the lycaenids or blues family. The species was first described by Vincenz Kollar in 1844.

== Subspecies ==
The subspecies of Pseudozizeeria maha are-

- Pseudozizeeria maha maha Kollar, 1844 – Pakistan, north and northeast India, Indochina
- Pseudozizeeria maha ossa Swinhoe, 1885 – south India
- Pseudozizeeria maha okinawana (Matsumura, 1929) – Okinawa, Japan; Taiwan
- Pseudozizeeria maha diluta (C. Felder & R. Felder, [1865]) – Yunnan
- Pseudozizeeria maha saishutonis (Matsumura, 1927) – Korea
- Pseudozizeeria maha argia (Ménétriès, 1857) – Japan

== Description ==
=== Wet-season brood ===
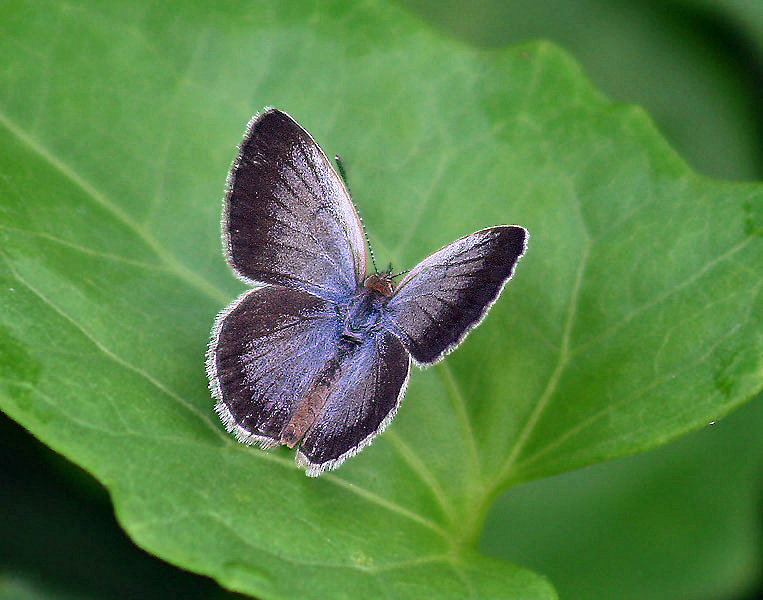
In Kolkata, West Bengal, India

Male. Upperside silvery light blue with a satiny sheen in certain lights. Forewing: the apical half of the costa narrowly and the terminal margin for varying widths fuscous black, bounded outwardly on the latter by an obscure anteciliary black line. Hindwing: the costa broadly, the termen somewhat more narrowly fuscous black as in the forewing, with the width of this dark edging similarly variable; in addition there is a very diffuse and ill-defined subterminal series of spots darker than the fuscous margin. Underside: brownish grey. Forewing: a spot in cell, a transverse lunule on the discocellulars, and a transverse anteriorly inwardly curved series of eight discal spots, black; the transverse lunule and each spot encircled with a narrow white edging; the posterior two spots of the discal series geminate (paired). Beyond these are a postdiscal and a subterminal series of short transverse dusky black spots followed by an anteciliary black line; the ground colour between the discal and postdiscal series and between the latter and the subterminal series of spots posteriorly paler than on the rest of the wing. Hindwing: a transverse, subbasal, slightly sinuate line of four spots, a short, slender, lunular line on the discocellulars, and a very strongly curved discal series of eight small spots, black; the lunule and each spot encircled with a narrow edging of white; the posterior two spots of the discal series geminate as on the forewing; beyond these as on the forewing there is a double line of dusky spots, only more lunular, with between them and between the discal and postdiscal series the ground colour in the same way followed by slightly paler; an anteciliary fine black line. Cilia of both forewings and hindwings whitey brown, darker anteriorly on the forewing. Antennae, head, thorax and abdomen dark brown, shafts of the antennae ringed with white; in fresh specimens the thorax and abdomen with a little light blue pubescence; beneath: palpi, thorax and abdomen white.

Female upperside: brownish black; the basal halves of the wings slightly suffused with light blue, anteciliary black lines on both forewings and hindwings, and on the latter wing an obscure subterminal series of spots as in the male. Underside, similar, only the ground colour darker, the markings larger and more clearly defined. Antennae, head, thorax and abdomen as in the male, but with no blue pubescence on the thorax and abdomen on the upperside.

=== Dry-season brood ===
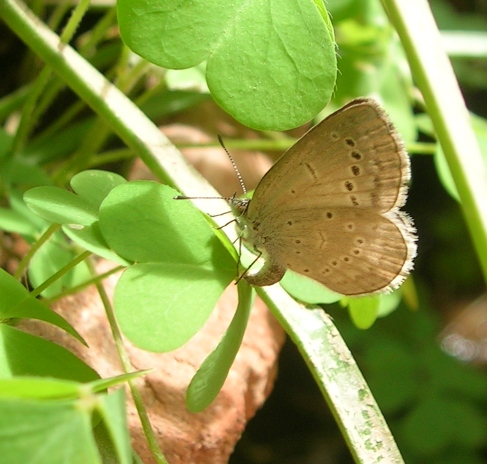
South Indian race laying eggs on Oxalis

Male upperside: pale bluish grey with, in some specimens, a pinkish undertone. Forewing: as in the wet-season brood, but the black terminal edging much reduced in width in some specimens to a transverse, somewhat diffuse, very narrow band that borders the anteciliary black line on the inner side, in others to a much broader similar band that coalesces with the anteciliary black line and occupies about the outer sixth of the wing. This edging along the termen is sometimes even, sometimes it widens from a slender anteciliary at and above the tornus to a broad black patch at the apex of the wing.

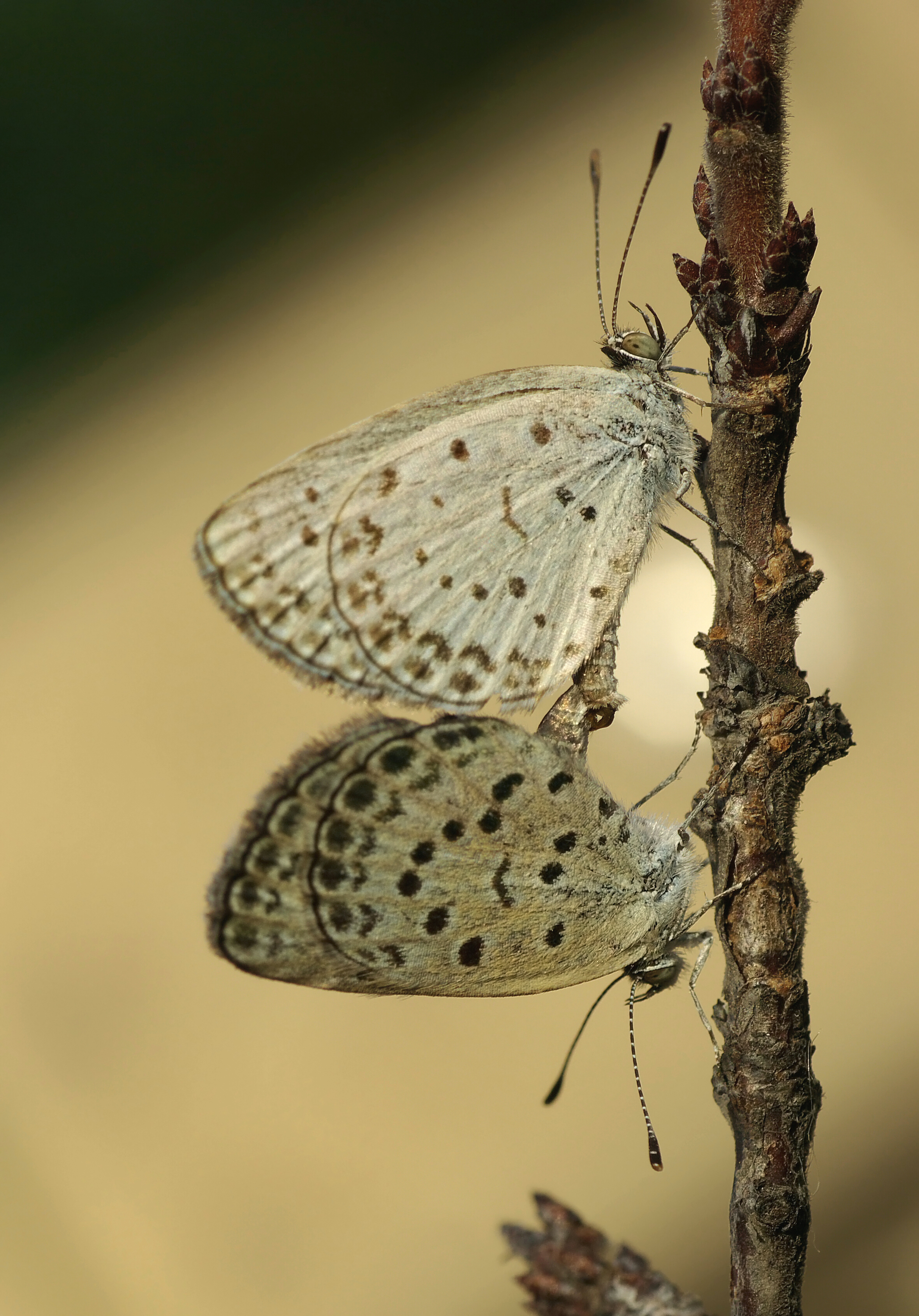
Mating in Osaka, Japan

Hindwing: the terminal black edging much narrower proportionately than in wet-season specimens, most often reduced to a slender black anteciliary line with a series of black spots on the inner side, bordering and sometimes coalescing with the line. Underside: as in the wet-season brood but the ground colour paler, in some specimens much paler, the markings on both forewings and hindwings similar, with frequently the terminal markings obsolescent, sometimes entirely absent or only indicated anteriorly on each wing. Cilia whitish. Antennae, head, thorax, and abdomen as in the wet-season specimens.

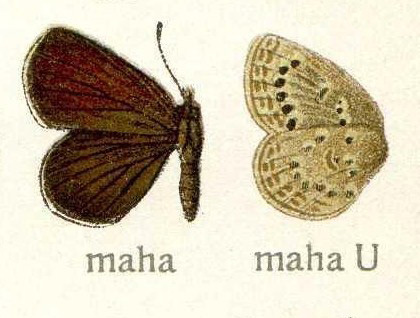
Upperside left, underside right, illustration from Adalbert Seitz's work

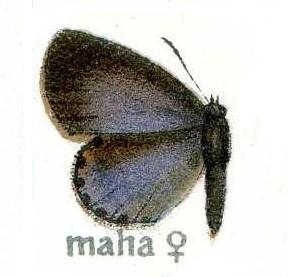
Female upperside, illustration from Seitz's work

Female similar to the female of the wet-season brood, but more like the male, with the light silvery-blue suffusion very irregular, but generally extended much further outwards from the base. Underside: as in the male, the ground colour slightly darker. Other variations exist:

In a female from Poona, now before me, the fore wing on the upper-side has the basal half silvery blue, the outer half black; on the hind wing, however, the blue colour extends almost to the termen which is only narrowly edged with diffuse dusky black.

— Charles Thomas Bingham

Antenna, head, thorax and abdomen similar to those of the male.

== Food plants ==
The eggs are laid on the host plants and the larvae hatch to feed on them. The plants include members of the Oxalidaceae including Oxalis corniculata, some Leguminosae and Acanthaceae.

== Other studies ==
A study in Japan used this species to detect the side-effects of transgenic Bt corn, particularly by way of pollen falling onto leaves of the Oxalis host plants. No significant effect was found in that study.

Other Japanese studies showed increased abnormalities in individuals of this species subjected to radiation following the Fukushima Daiichi nuclear disaster. Additionally, there are different studies on the recent migrations of the species to northern climates, where cold habitat leads to the increase of modifications of wing color pattern, found in northern margin populations of Japan.

== Gallery ==
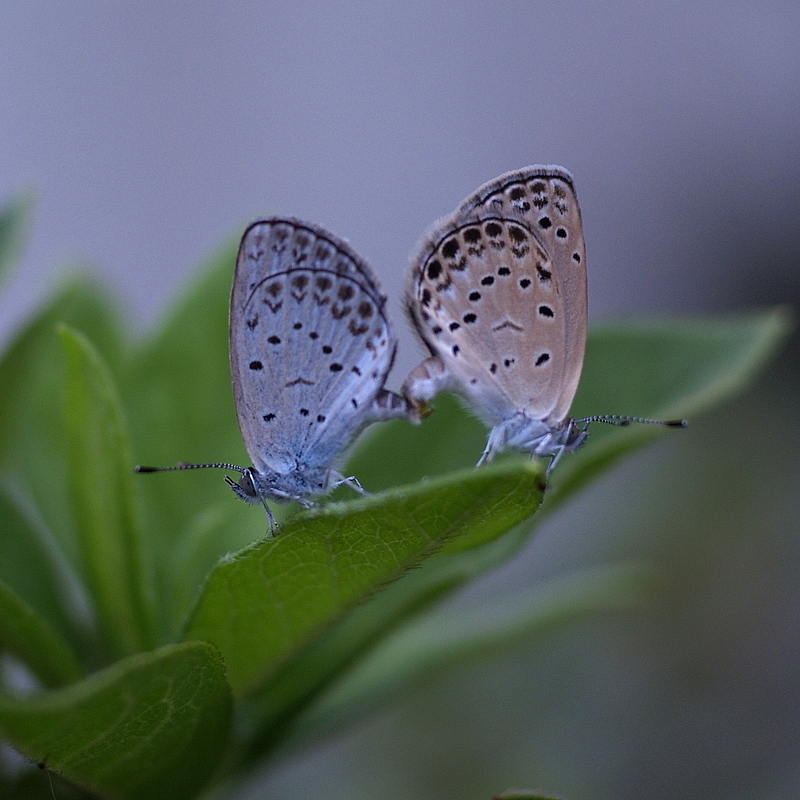
Mating

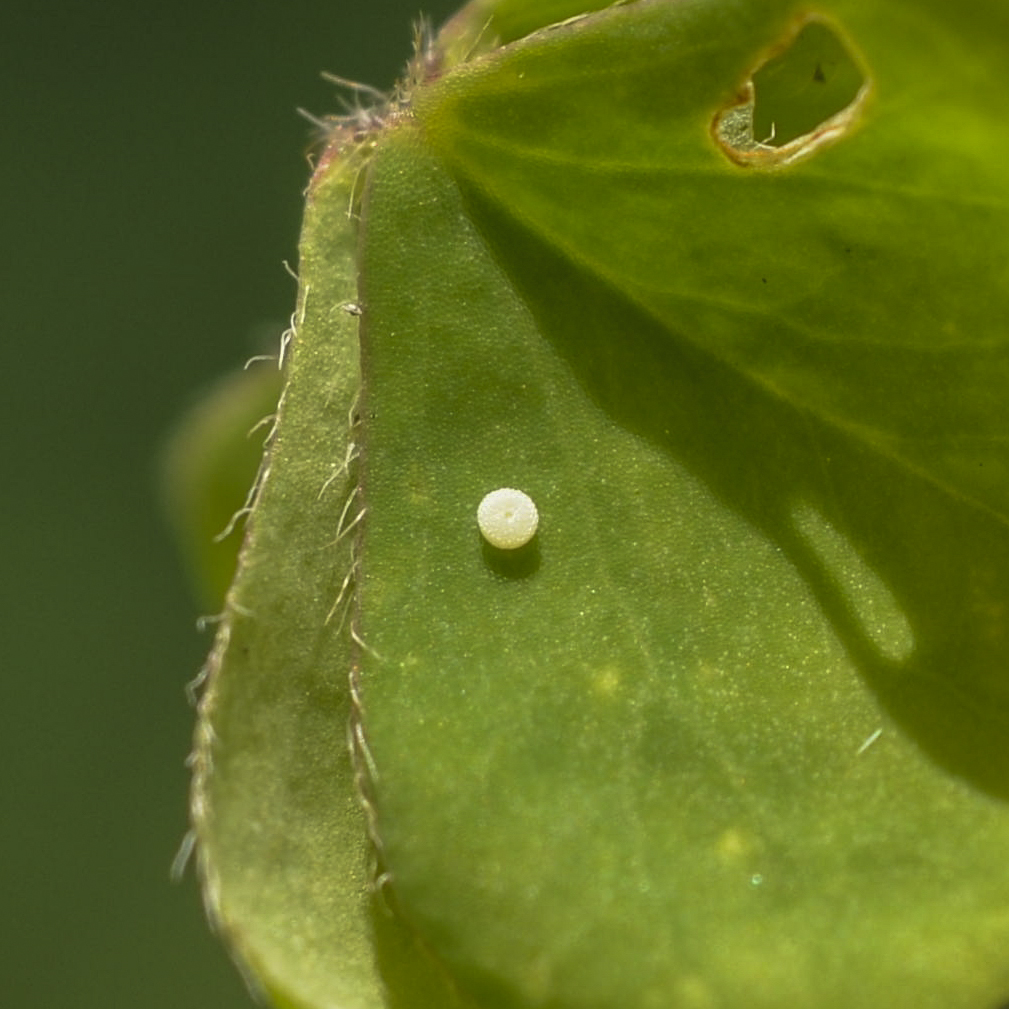
Egg

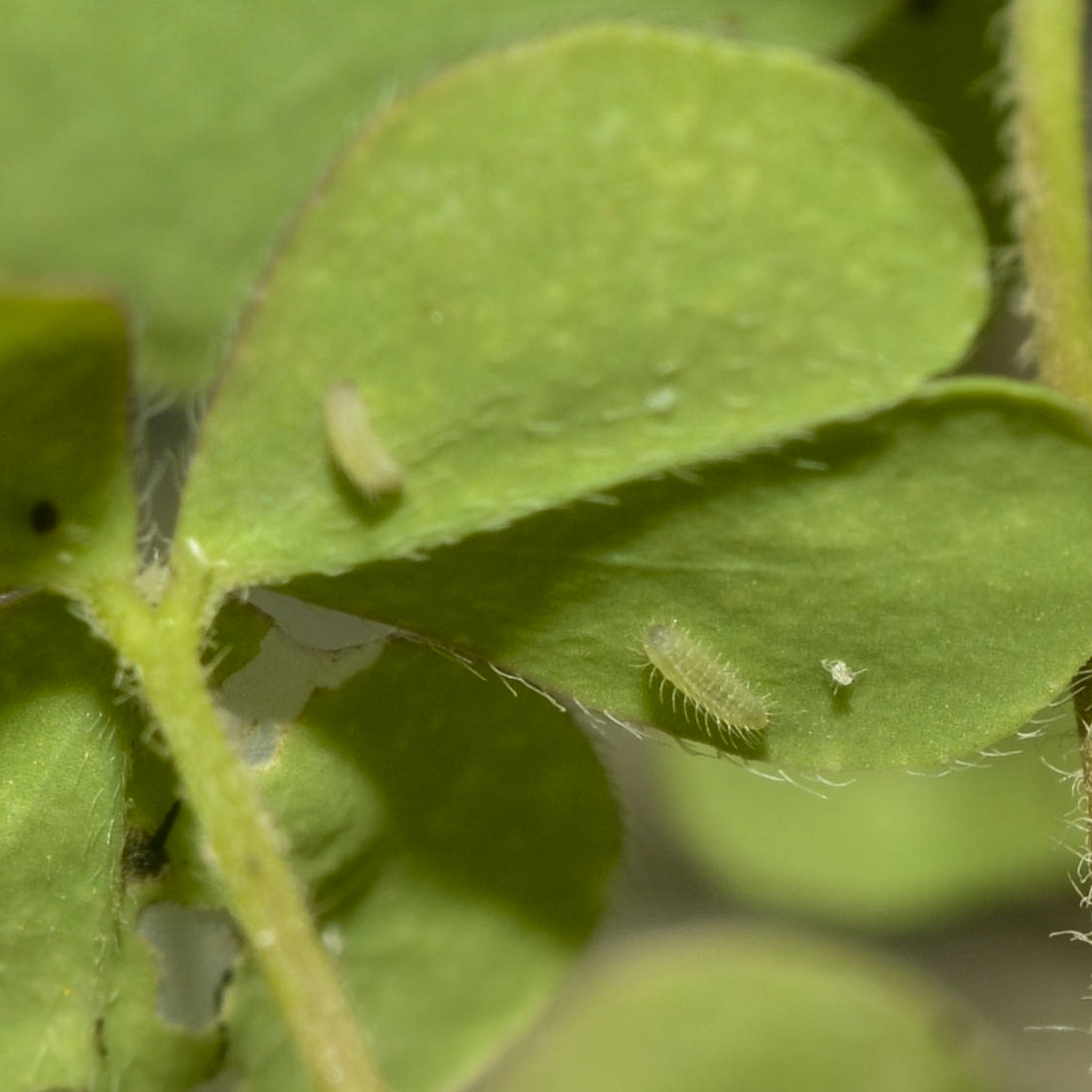
1st instar caterpillar

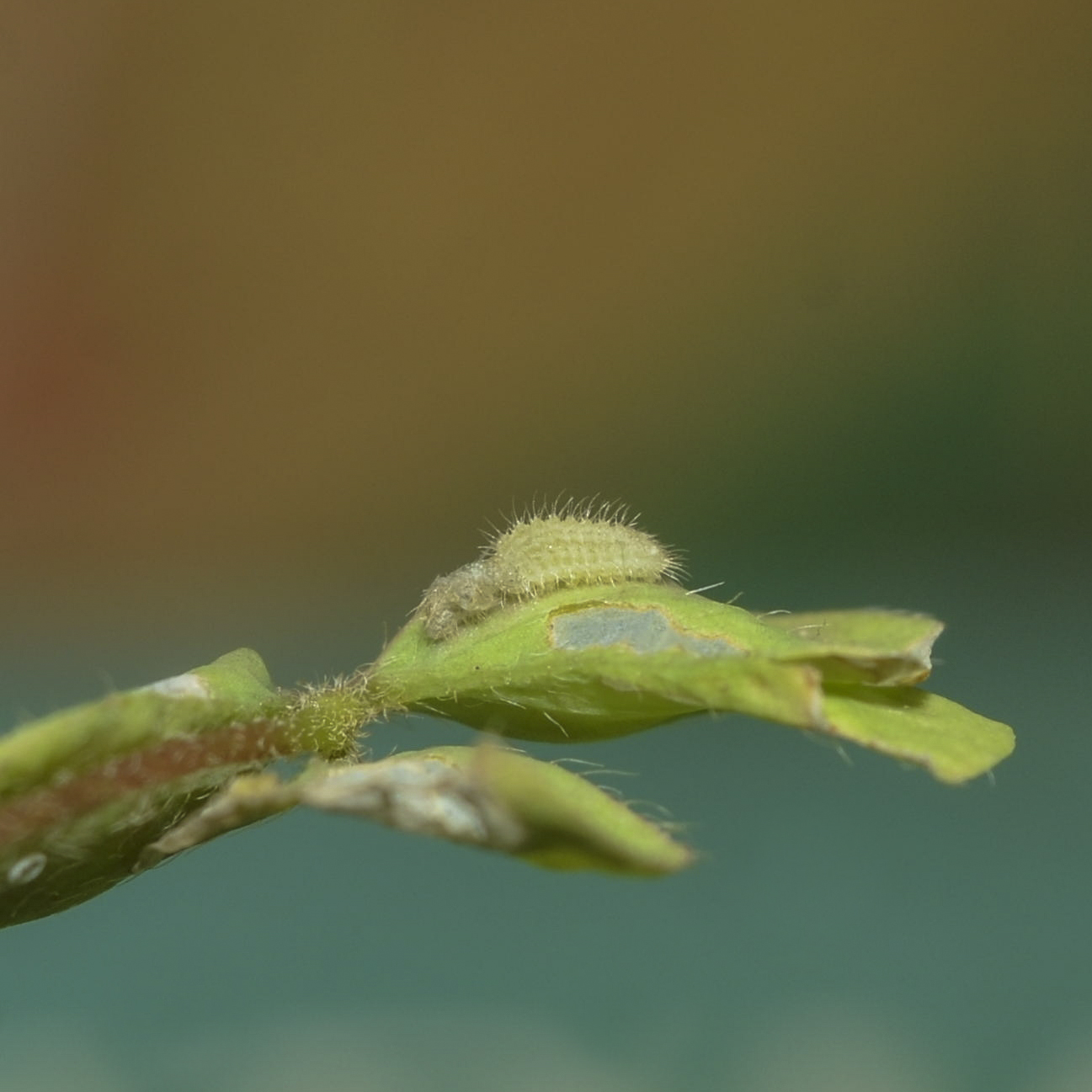
2nd instar caterpillar

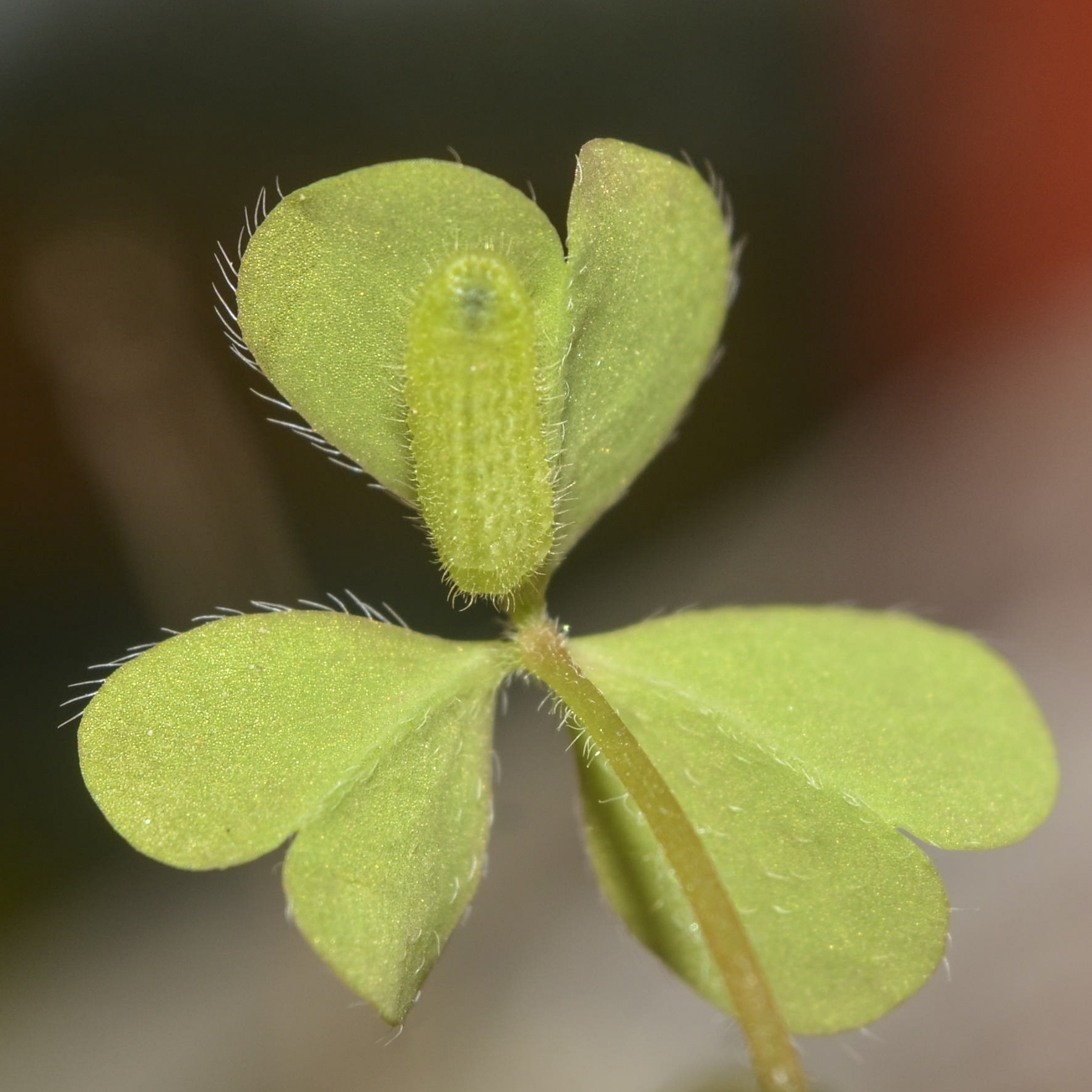
3rd instar caterpillar

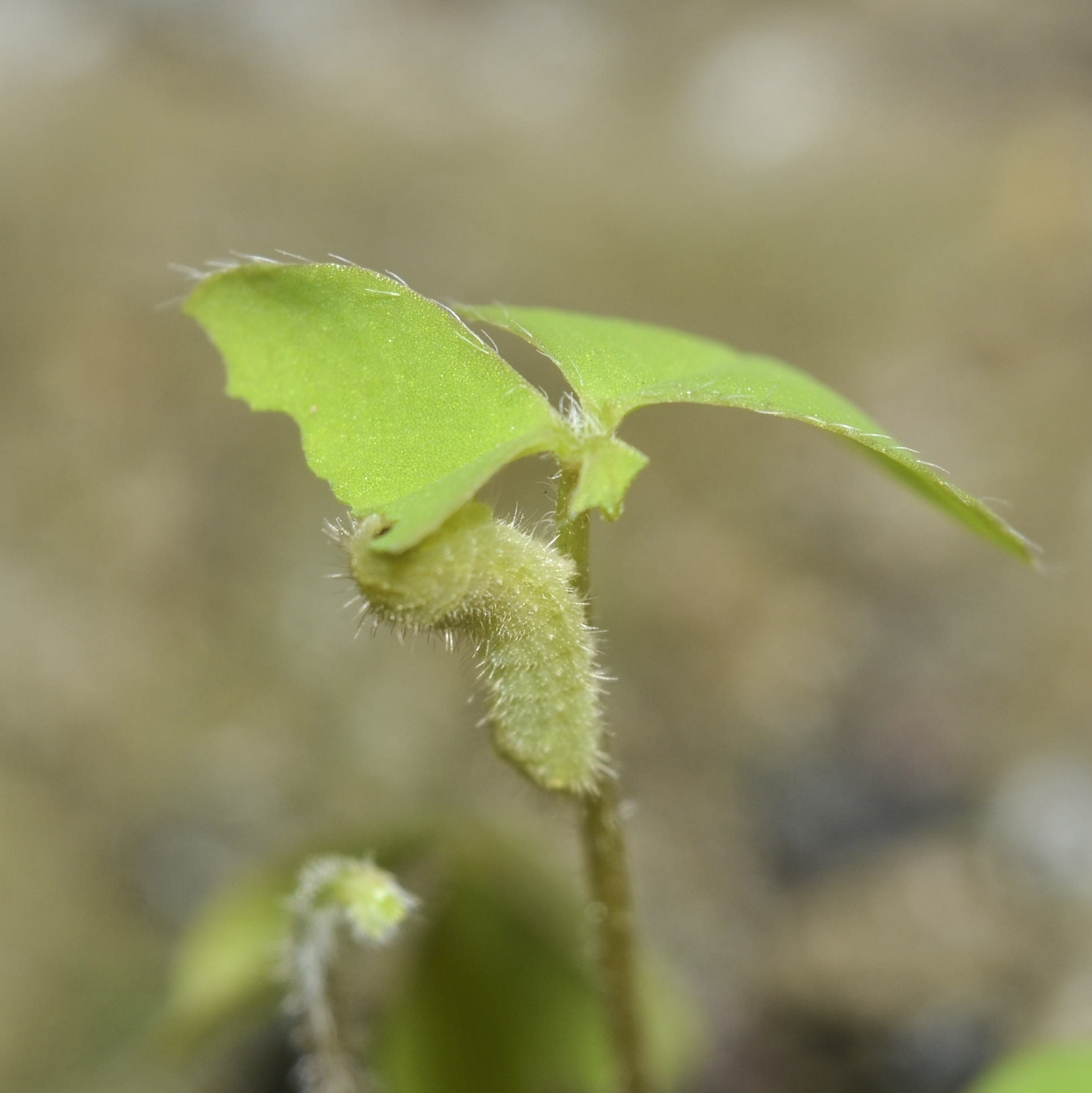
4th instar caterpillar

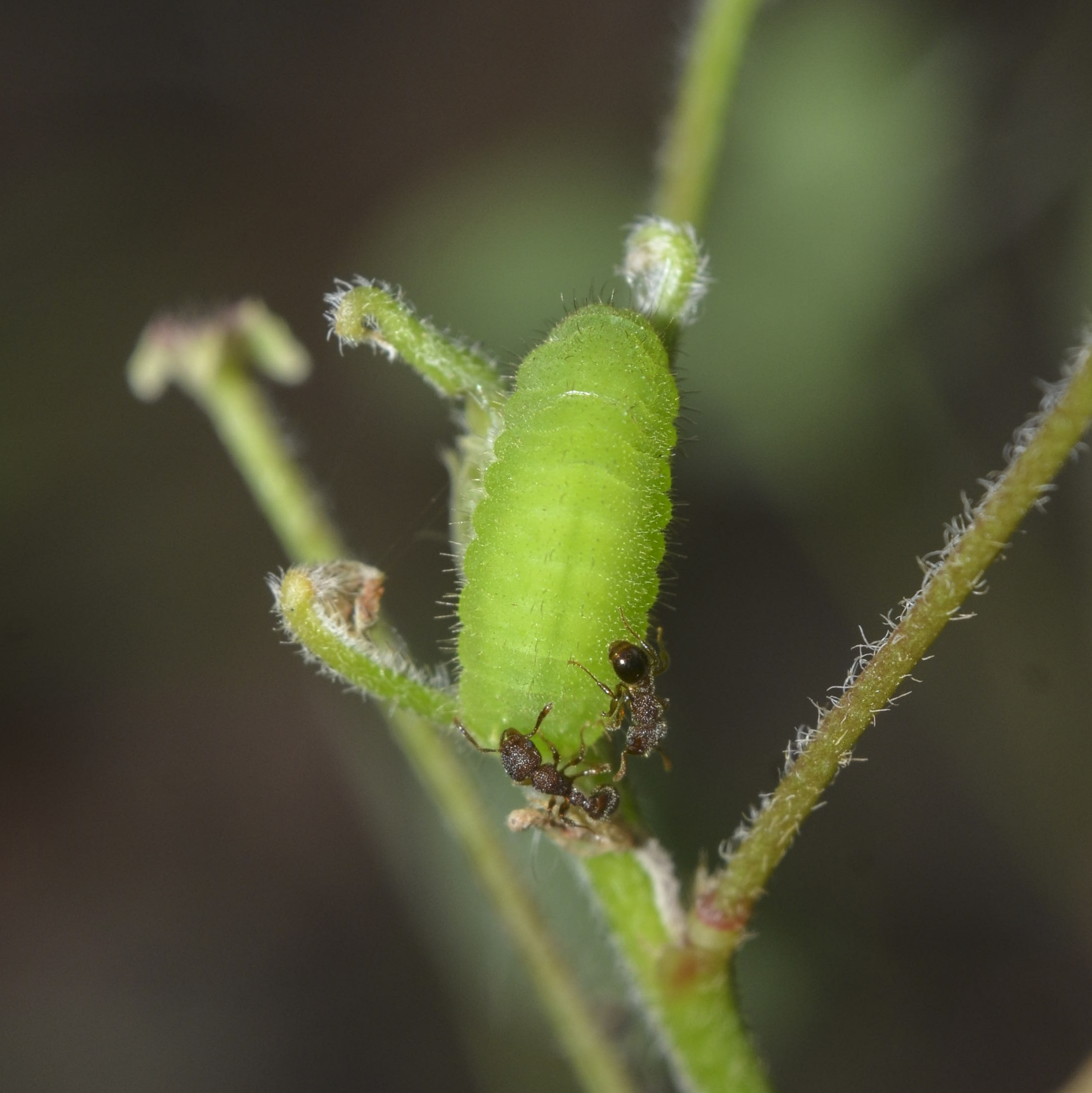
5th instar caterpillar

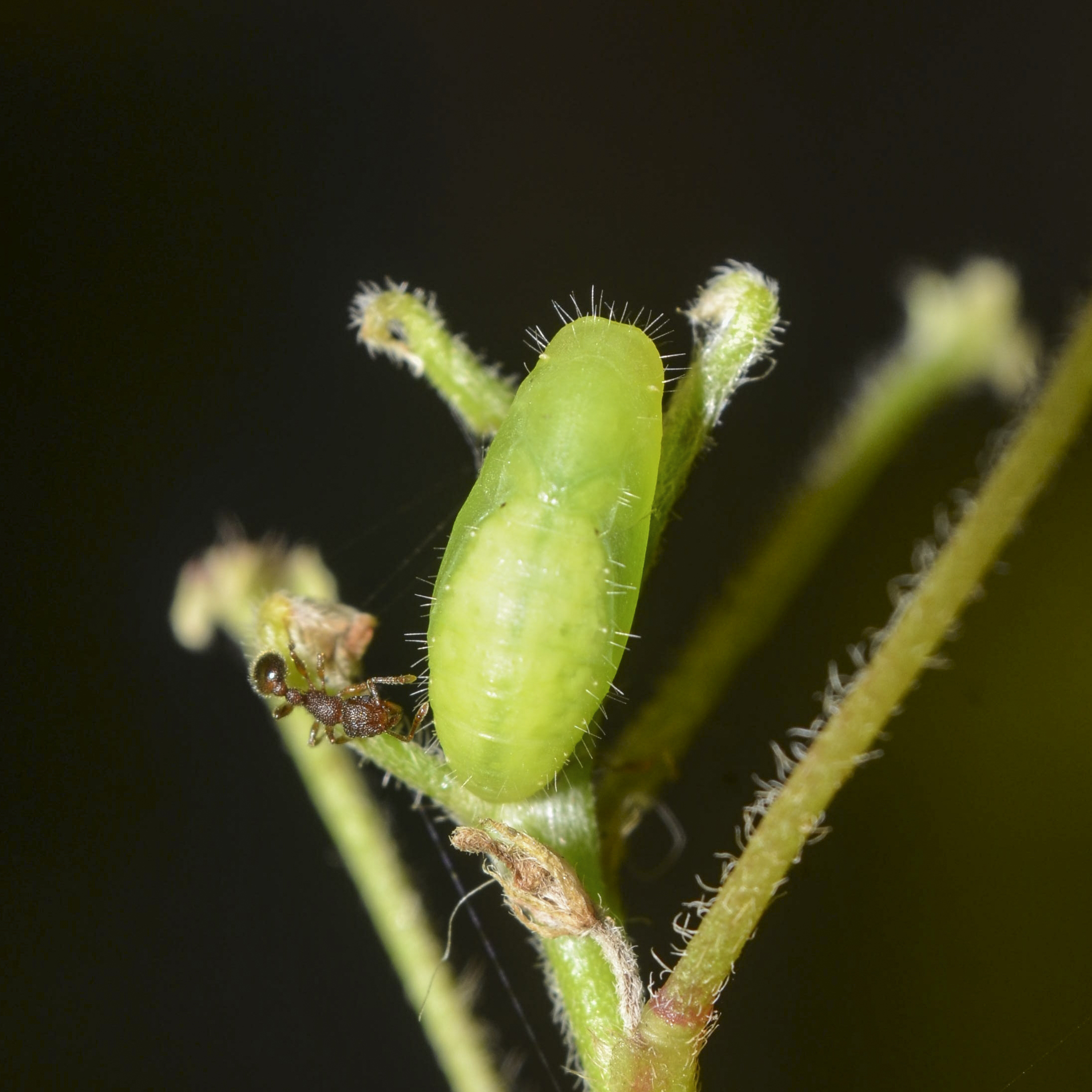
Pupa

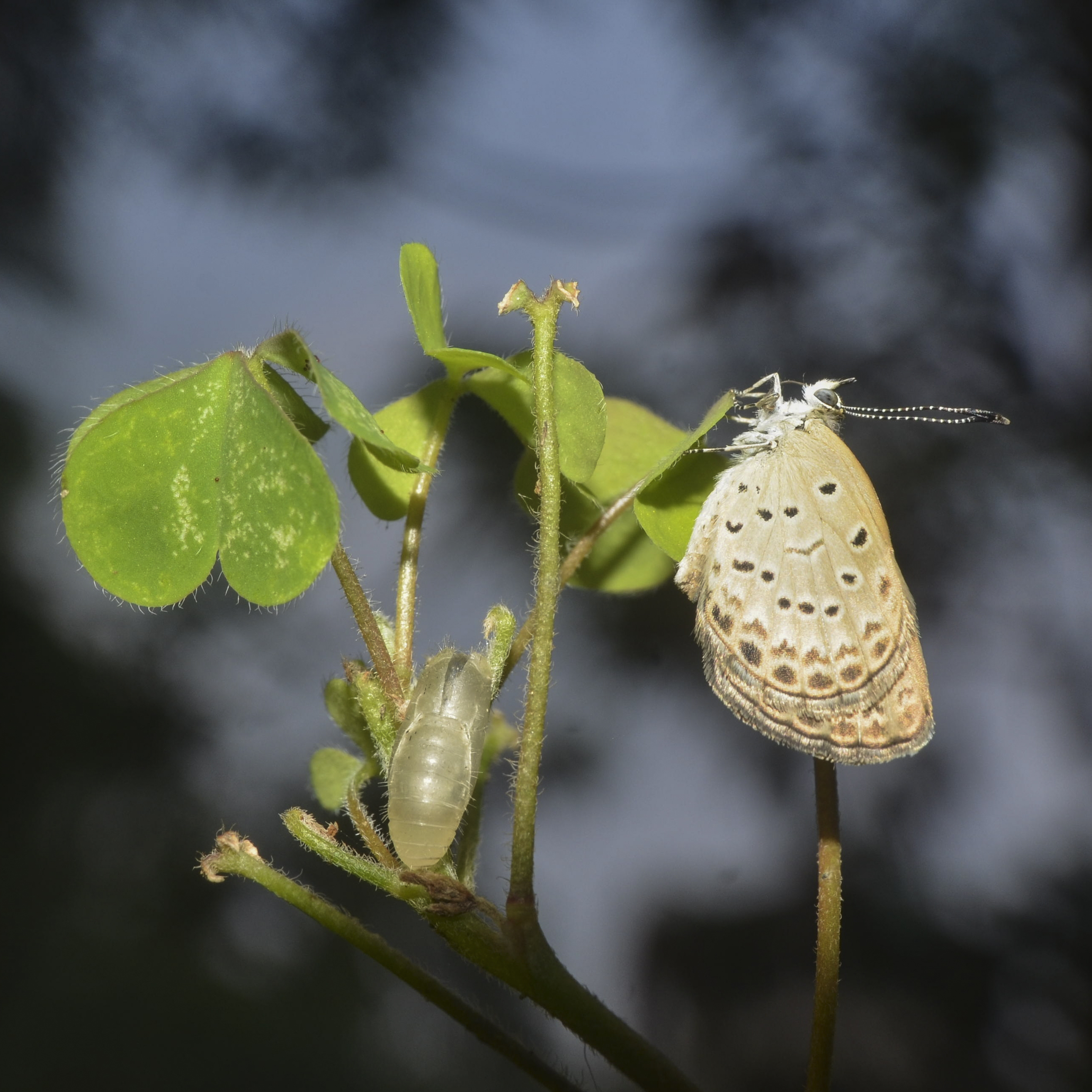
Freshly emerged

== See also ==
- List of butterflies of India (Lycaenidae)

== General reading ==
- Evans, W.H. (1932). The Identification of Indian Butterflies (2nd ed.). Mumbai, India: Bombay Natural History Society.
- Gaonkar, Harish (1996). Butterflies of the Western Ghats, India (including Sri Lanka) - A Biodiversity Assessment of a Threatened Mountain System. Bangalore, India: Centre for Ecological Sciences.
- Gay, Thomas; Kehimkar, Isaac David; Punetha, Jagdish Chandra (1992). Common Butterflies of India. Nature Guides. Bombay, India: World Wide Fund for Nature-India by Oxford University Press. ISBN 978-0195631647.
- Haribal, Meena (1992). The Butterflies of Sikkim Himalaya and Their Natural History. Gangtok, Sikkim, India: Sikkim Nature Conservation Foundation.
- Kunte, Krushnamegh (2000). Butterflies of Peninsular India. India, A Lifescape. Hyderabad, India: Universities Press. ISBN 978-8173713545.
- Wynter-Blyth, Mark Alexander (1957). Butterflies of the Indian Region. Bombay, India: Bombay Natural History Society. ISBN 978-8170192329.
