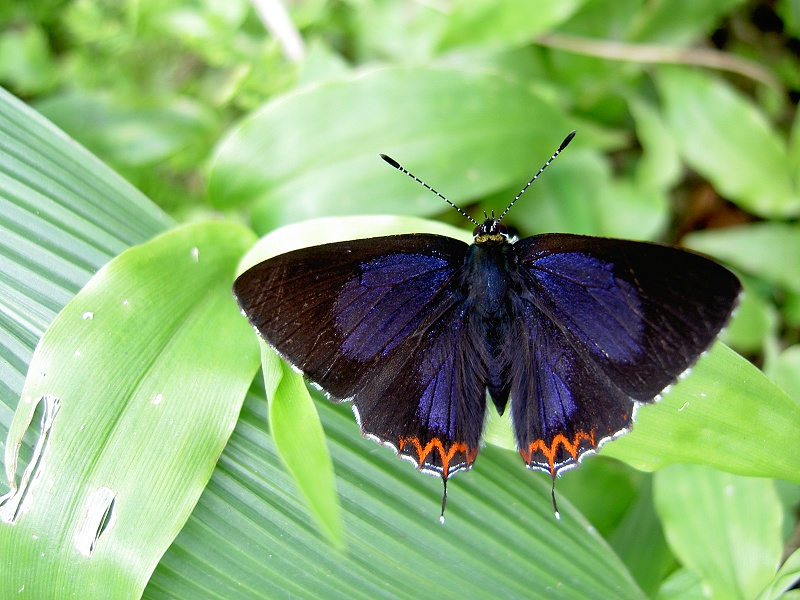
- Male Heliophorus ila matsumurae

Scientific classification
- Kingdom: Animalia
- Phylum: Arthropoda
- Class: Insecta
- Order: Lepidoptera
- Superfamily: Papilionoidea
- Family: Lycaenidae
- Subfamily: Lycaeninae; Leach, 1815

Tribes
- Heliophorini; Lycaenini

= Lycaeninae =

Subfamily of butterflies

Lycaeninae, the coppers, are a subfamily of the gossamer-winged butterflies (Lycaenidae).

The relationships of the Lycaenidae are not fully resolved. Sometimes the Polyommatinae and Theclinae are included in the Lycaeninae; in particular the Theclinae tribe Eumaeini contains many similar taxa. Consequently, the delimitation of the Lycaeninae is by no means definitely resolved; many genera await conformation of placement. Regardless, it is today generally considered better to restrict the Lycaeninae to the immediate relatives of the type genus Lycaena, and one or two clades close to that group.

== Taxonomy ==
The Lycaeninae sensu stricto can be divided into two tribes:

- Heliophorini
  - Heliophorus – sapphires
  - Iophanus
  - Melanolycaena
- Lycaenini
  - Athamanthia
  - Gaeides (often included in Lycaena)
  - Hyrcanana
  - Lycaena – typical coppers
  - Phoenicurusia

A few genera included in the Lycaeninae in the most extensive circumscriptions are now placed in subfamilies as distinct as the Poritiinae. Finally, there are some genera of uncertain status as regards their systematics and taxonomic validity. They might, if valid, be members of the monophyletic Lycaeninae, but this requires confirmation:

- Alciphronia
- Apangea
- Kulua
- Mirzakhania
- Nesa
