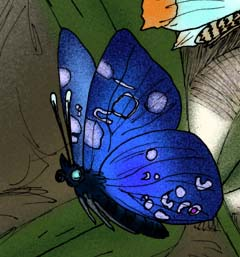
- L. styx

Scientific classification
- Kingdom: Animalia
- Phylum: Arthropoda
- Class: Insecta
- Order: Lepidoptera
- Family: Lycaenidae
- Genus: †Lithodryas; Cockerell, 1909
- Species: †L. stix

Binomial name
- †Lithodryas stix (Scudder, 1889)

Synonyms
- Genus-level: Lithopsyche Scudder, 1889 (non Butler, 1889: preoccupied); Species-level: Lithopsyche styx Scudder, 1889

= Lithodryas =

Lithodryas stix Temporal range: Chadronian

Extinct genus of butterflies

Lithodryas is a prehistoric genus of butterflies in the family Lycaenidae. It was introduced as a replacement for Samuel Hubbard Scudder's genus Lithopsyche, which is invalid as a homonym, as another fossil lepidopteran genus had been described under the same name shortly before Scudder established his genus.

The type species was found in Latest Eocene-aged deposits at Florissant.
