= List of lycaenid genera =

This is an index to lists of genera in the family Lycaenidae.
