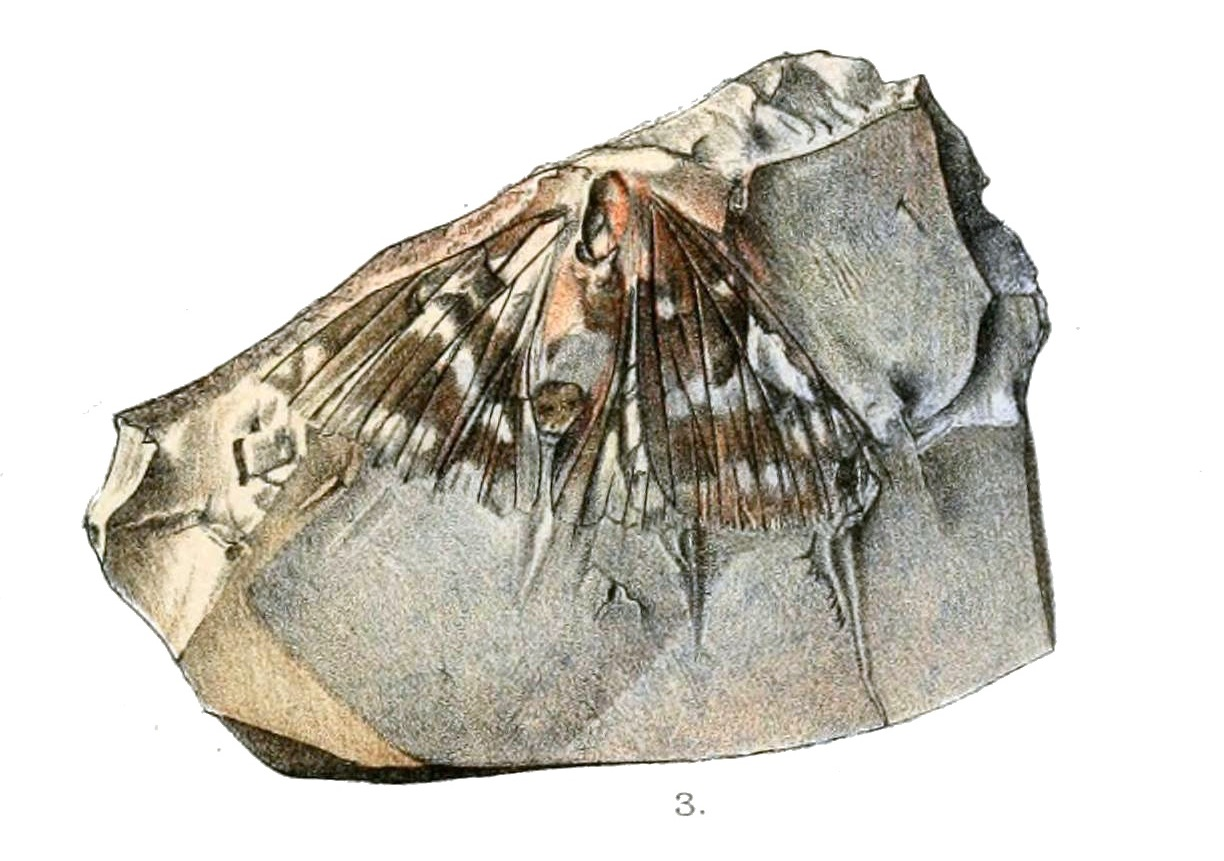
- Illustration by Frederick William Frohawk

Scientific classification
- Kingdom: Animalia
- Phylum: Arthropoda
- Clade: Pancrustacea
- Class: Insecta
- Order: Lepidoptera
- Superfamily: Papilionoidea
- Family: incertae sedis
- Genus: †Lithopsyche; Butler, 1889
- Species: †L. antiqua

Binomial name
- †Lithopsyche antiqua Butler, 1889

= Lithopsyche =

Lithopsyche Temporal range: Oligocene

Extinct genus of butterflies

Lithopsyche is a genus of fossil butterflies known from Oligocene-aged strata of the Isle of Wight, England. The sole specimen is too incomplete to allow a certain assignment of a family, but it was placed on its description as a geometrid and more recently in the Riodininae.

The late Eocene-aged Lithodryas styx, of Colorado, was originally described with the same genus name.
