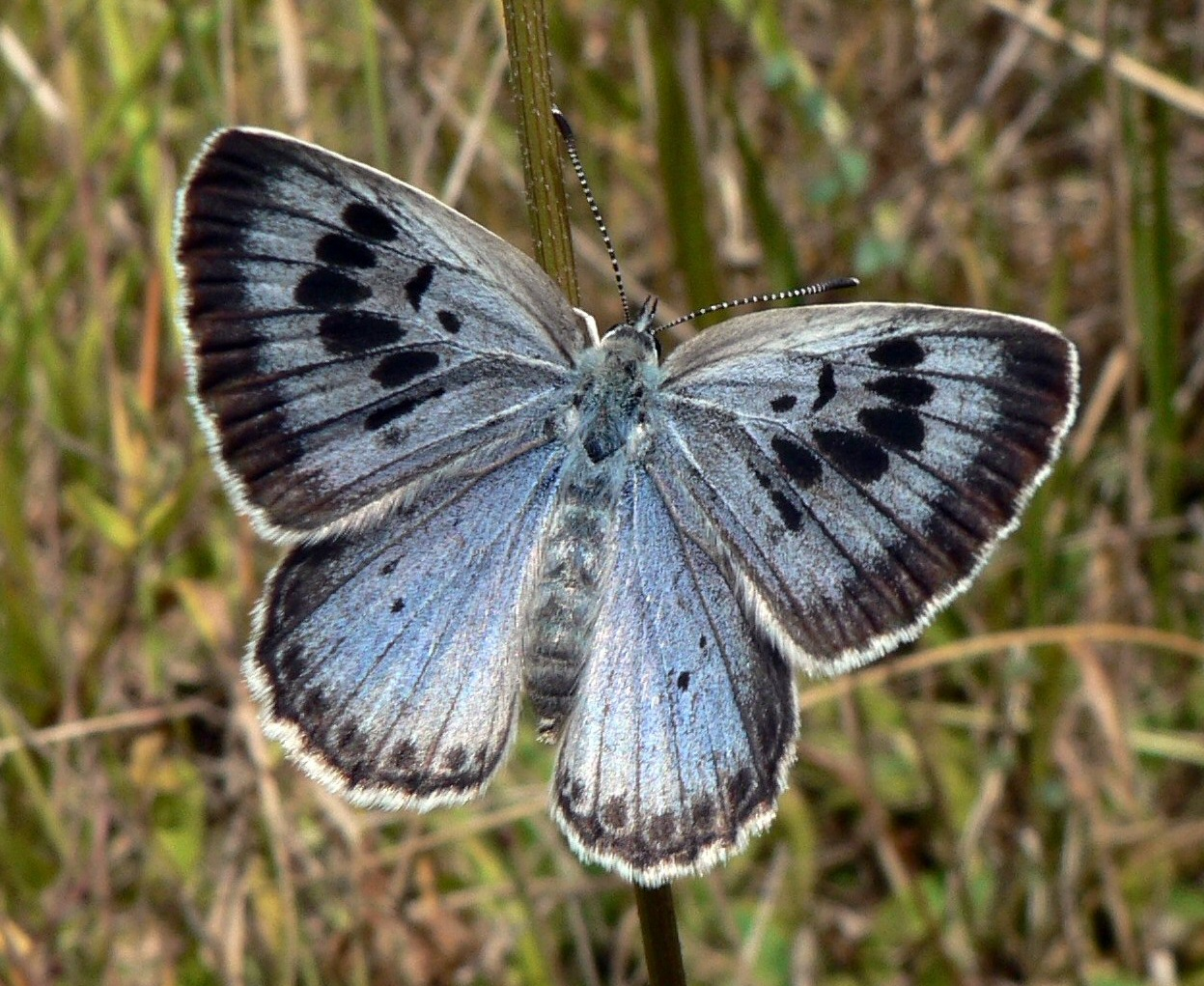
- The large blue, a lycaenid butterfly

Scientific classification
- Kingdom: Animalia
- Phylum: Arthropoda
- Clade: Pancrustacea
- Class: Insecta
- Order: Lepidoptera
- Superfamily: Papilionoidea
- Family: Lycaenidae; Leach, 1815

Subfamilies
- Aphnaeinae; Eumaeine; Curetinae – sunbeams; Lycaeninae – coppers; Miletinae – harvesters; Polyommatinae – blues; Poritiinae; Theclinae – hairstreaks, elfins; and see text or List of lycaenid genera

= Lycaenidae =

Family of butterflies

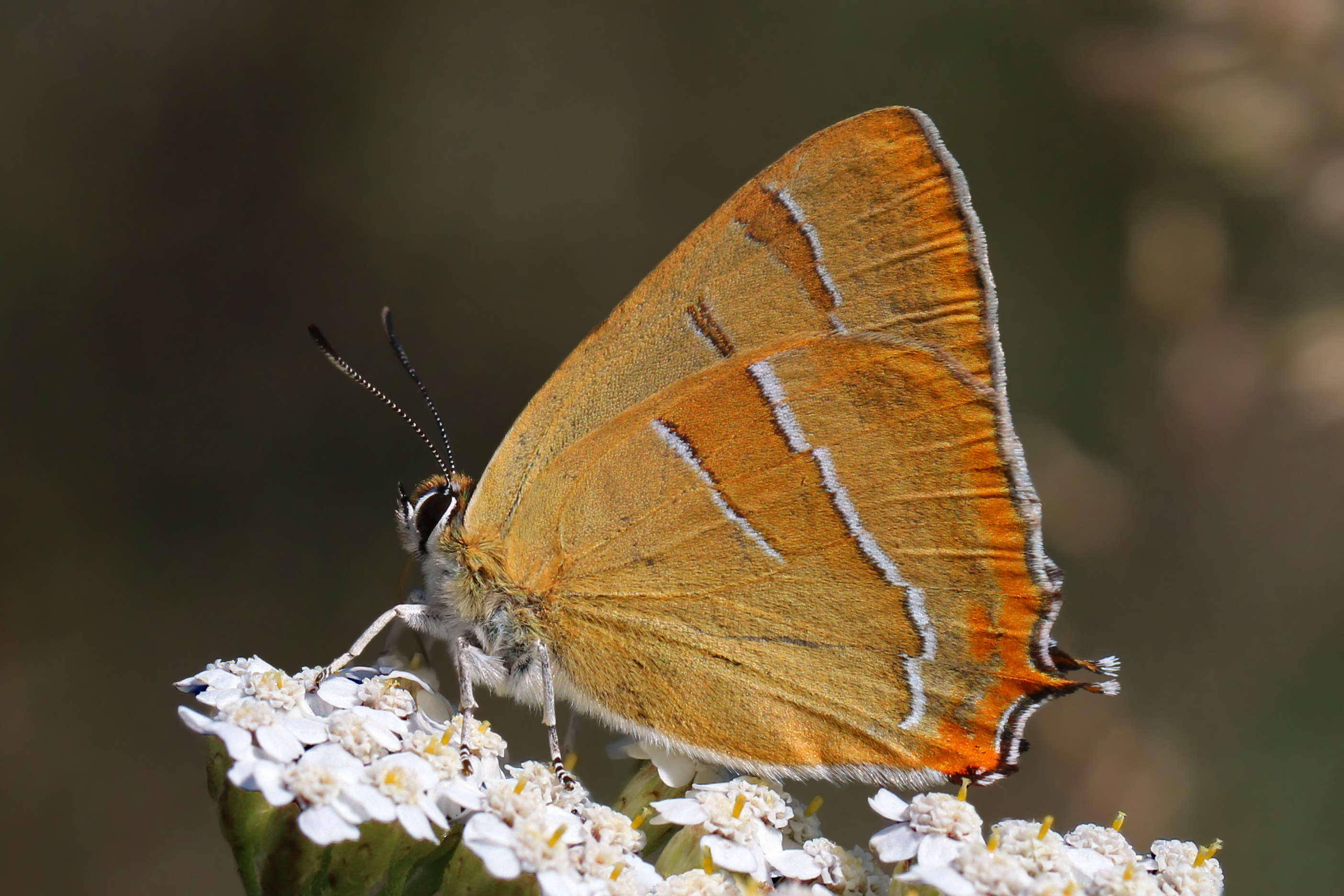
Brown hairstreak (Thecla betulae)

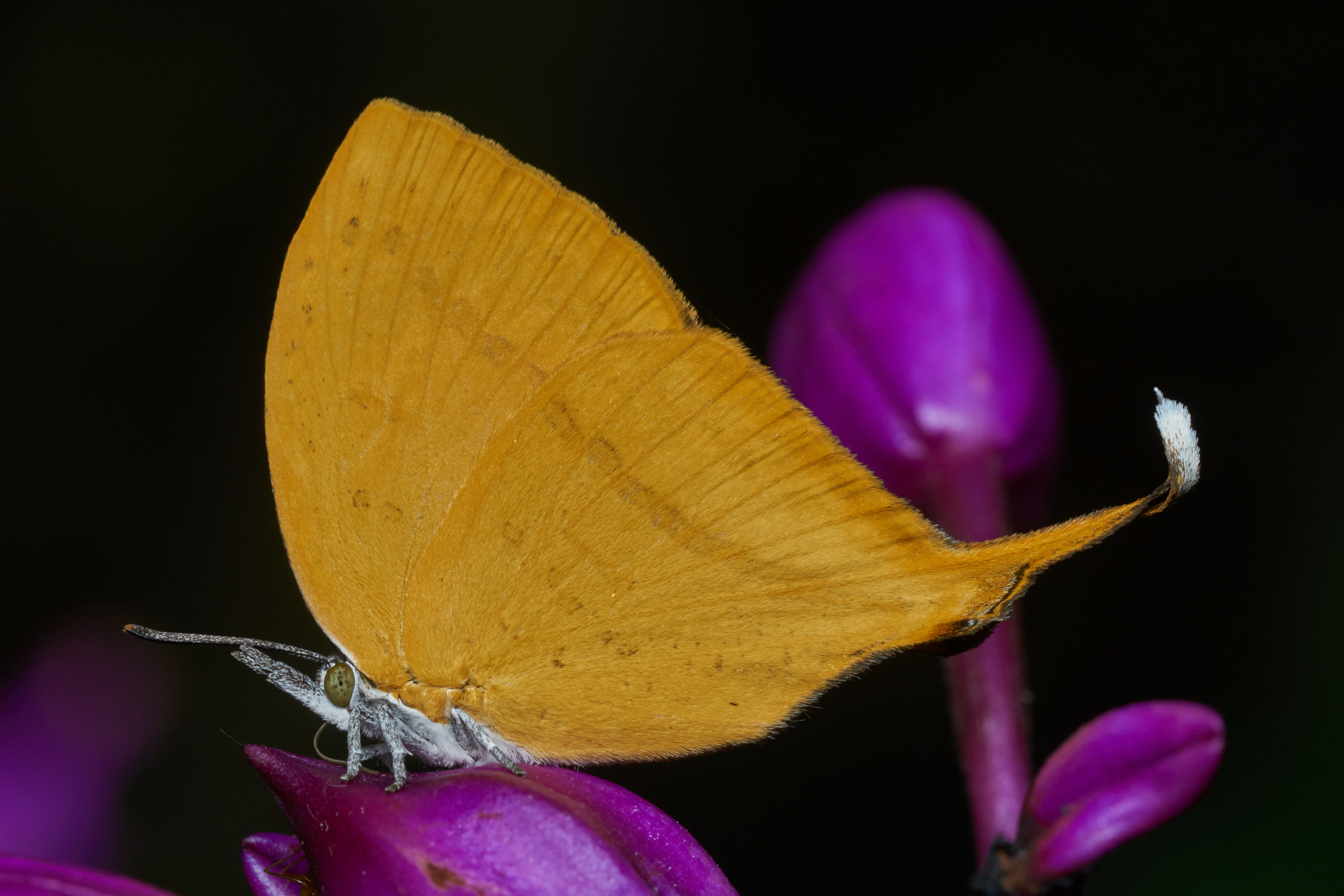
Loxura atymnus

Lycaenidae is a family of butterflies with over 6,000 species worldwide; its members are also called gossamer-winged butterflies. It is the second-largest butterfly family (behind Nymphalidae, the brush-footed butterflies), constituting about 30% of the known butterfly species.

The family comprises eight subfamilies, including the blues (Polyommatinae), the coppers (Lycaeninae), the hairstreaks (Theclinae), and the harvesters (Miletinae).

== Description, food, and life cycle ==
Adults are small, usually under 5 cm (2 in), and are brightly coloured, sometimes with a metallic gloss. Lycaenidae wings are generally blue or green. More than half of these butterflies depend on ants in some way.

Larvae are often flattened rather than cylindrical, with glands that may produce secretions that attract and subdue ants. Their cuticles tend to be thickened. Some larvae are capable of producing vibrations and low sounds that are transmitted through the substrates they inhabit. They use these sounds to communicate with ants.

Adult individuals often have hairy antenna-like tails complete with black and white annulated (ringed) appearance. Many species also have a spot at the base of the tail and some turn around upon landing to confuse potential predators from recognizing the true head orientation. This causes predators to approach from the true head end resulting in early visual detection or to attack the false head ending up with a beak of dusty scales.

Lycaenid caterpillars are diverse in their food habits and apart from phytophagy, some are entomophagous, feeding on aphids, scale insects, and ant larvae. Some lycaenids even exploit their association with ants by inducing ants to feed them by regurgitation, a process called trophallaxis. Not all lycaenid butterflies need ants, but about 75% of species associate with ants, a relationship called myrmecophily. These associations can be mutualistic, parasitic, or predatory depending on the species.

In some species, larvae are attended and protected by ants while feeding on the host plant, and the ants receive sugar-rich honeydew from them, throughout the larval life, and in some species during the pupal stage. In other species, only the first few instars are spent on the plant, and the remainder of the larval lifespan is spent as a predator within the ant nest. It becomes a parasite, feeding on ant regurgitations, or a predator on the ant larvae. The caterpillars pupate inside the ants' nest and the ants continue to look after the pupae. Just before the adults emerge, the wings of the butterfly inside the pupal case detach from it, and the pupa becomes silvery. The adult butterfly emerges from the pupa after three to four weeks, still inside the ant nest. The butterfly must crawl out of the ant nest before it can expand its wings.

Several evolutionary adaptations enable these associations, including small glands on the skin of the caterpillars called "pore cupola organs". Caterpillars of many species have a gland on the seventh abdominal segment that produces honeydew and is called the "dorsal nectary gland" (also called "Newcomer's gland"). An eversible organ called the "tentacular organ" is present on the eighth abdominal segment and this is cylindrical and topped with a ring of spikes and emits chemical signals which are believed to help in communicating with ants.

== Subfamilies ==
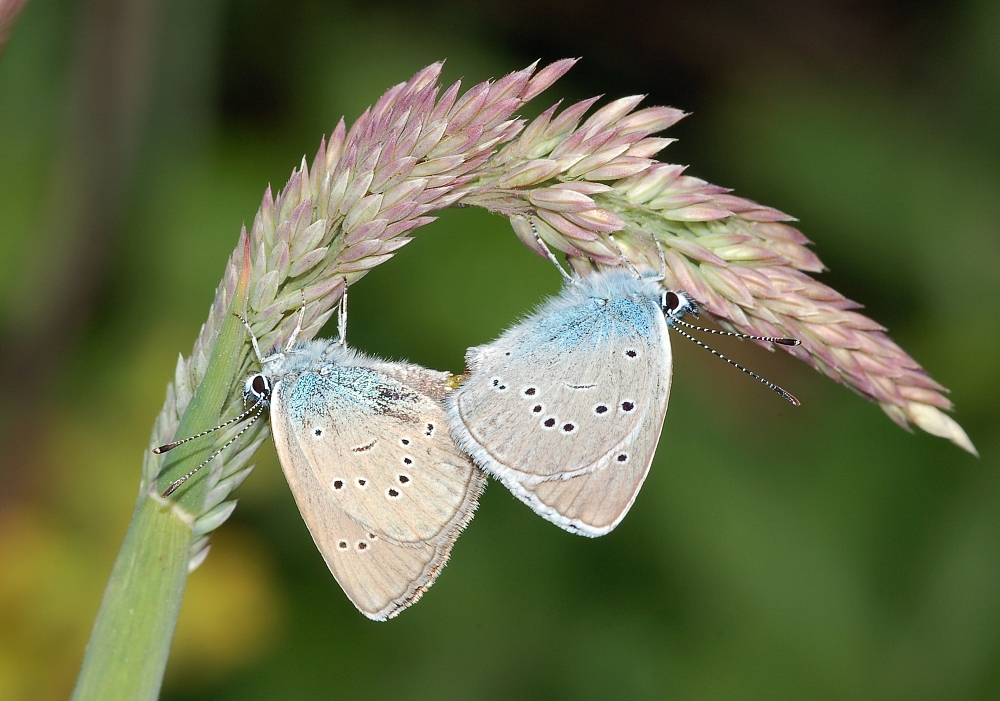
Mating Cyaniris semiargus

Many taxonomists only include the Lycaeninae, Theclinae, Polyommatinae, Poritiinae, Miletinae, and Curetinae under the Lycaenidae. The Aphnaeinae, which used to be a tribe (Aphnaeini) within the Theclinae, were recently given subfamily rank too.

- Curetinae – sunbeams (Oriental or Palaearctic). Selected species:
  - Curetis thetis – Indian sunbeam
- Miletinae – harvesters (mostly African, or Oriental, one Nearctic), probably all feed on aphids or their secretions. Selected species:
  - Liphyra brassolis – moth butterfly (largest lycaenid)
- Poritiinae (Oriental and Afrotropical)
- Aphnaeinae (Afrotropical and Oriental)
- Theclinae – hairstreaks (usually tailed) and elfins (not tailed) (global). Selected species:
  - Arhopala – oakblues
  - Atlides halesus – great purple hairstreak
  - Eumaeus atala – Atala
  - Satyrium pruni – black hairstreak
- Lycaeninae – coppers (Holarctic). Selected species:
  - Iophanus pyrrhias – Guatemalan copper
  - Lycaena boldenarum – boulder copper
  - Lycaena epixanthe – bog copper
  - Lycaena rauparaha – Rauparaha's copper
  - Lycaena dispar – large copper
  - Lycaena phlaeas – small copper
  - Lycaena heteronea – blue copper
- Polyommatinae – blues (global). Selected species:
  - Celastrina ladon – spring azure
  - Chilades – jewel blues
  - Cupido comyntas – eastern tailed-blue
  - Cupido minimus – small blue
  - Cyaniris semiargus – mazarine blue
  - Euphilotes battoides allyni – El Segundo blue
  - Euphilotes pallescens arenamontana – Sand Mountain blue
  - Glaucopsyche lygdamus – silvery blue
  - Glaucopsyche lygdamus palosverdesensis – Palos Verdes blue
  - Glaucopsyche xerces (extinct) – Xerces blue
  - Icaricia icarioides fenderi – Fender's blue
  - Phengaris arion – large blue
  - Phengaris alcon – Alcon blue
  - Polyommatus icarus – common blue
  - Pseudozizeeria maha – pale grass blue
  - Plebejus argus – silver-studded blue
  - Talicada nyseus – red Pierrot

Some older classifications used to include other subfamilies such as Liphyrinae (now Liphyrini, a tribe within Miletinae), Lipteninae (now Liptenini, a tribe within Poritiinae), or Riodininae (now a separate family: Riodinidae).

The fossil genus Lithodryas is usually (but not unequivocally) placed here; Lithopsyche is sometimes placed here, but sometimes in the Riodininae.

== See also ==
- List of lycaenid genera
