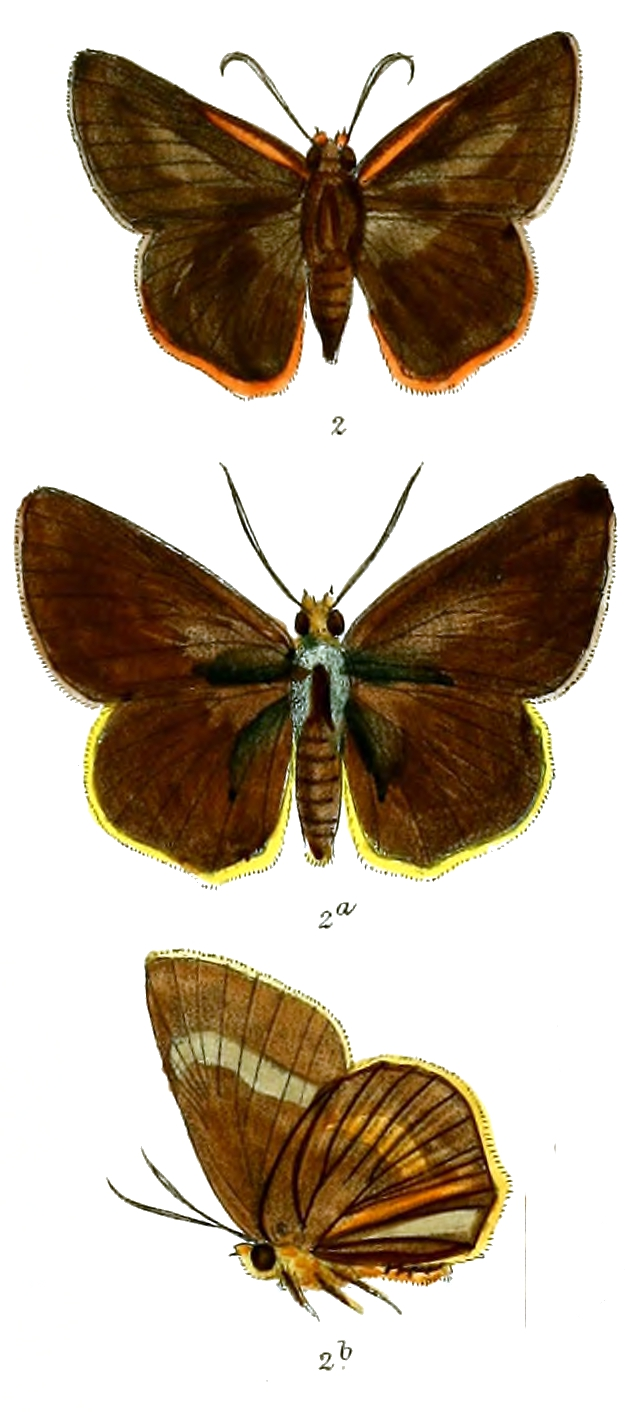
- Male (top), female and male underwing

Scientific classification
- Domain: Eukaryota
- Kingdom: Animalia
- Phylum: Arthropoda
- Class: Insecta
- Order: Lepidoptera
- Family: Hesperiidae
- Genus: Burara
- Species: B. anadi

Binomial name
- Burara anadi (de Niceville, 1883)

Synonyms
- Choaspes anadi de Niceville, 1883

= Burara anadi =

Species of butterfly

Burara anadi, the plain orange awlet, is a species of hesperid butterfly found in India and Southeast Asia. The butterfly has been reassigned by Vane-Wright and de Jong (2003) to the genus Burara and is considered by them Burara anadi. Some treatments place them in the genus Bibasis.

== Range ==
The plain orange awlet ranges from India, (Mussoorie, Sikkim eastwards through Assam), to the Karen Hills in Myanmar, northern Thailand and Laos.

== Status ==
The species is considered rare.

== Description ==
The butterfly has a wingspan of 50 to 55 mm.

Edward Yerbury Watson (1891) gives a detailed description:

Male. Upperside dark vinaceous brown distinctly glossed with purple, slightly paler in the middle of the disc. Forewing with a costal streak from the base to beyond the middle of the wing rich orange; cilia cinereous. Hindwing with the costa broadly pale ochreous; the cilia rich orange. Base of both wings and thorax clothed with long pale green iridescent hairs. Underside paler brown washed with ochreous, which colour assumes indistinct streaks between the veins on the hindwing. Forewing with the outer margin broadly washed with deep purple, the inner margin broadly pale ochreous; some pale streaks between the veins beyond the end of the cell; a round black spot at the extreme base of the wing with a spot of bright orange above it; hindwing with a similar but larger black spot. Antennae dark brown above, ochreous below; palpi with the third joint dark brown, the second and first with the outer edge brown, the rest orange, which is the colour of the legs, the underside of the body and the anal tuft. The female differs from the male only in being larger and darker, the upperside of the hindwing concolorous with the rest of the wing, not broadly pale ochreous as in the male. The male of this species closely resembles that sex of Bibasis harisa, Moore, but differs in the forewing being much narrower, and on the hindwing in having the costal pale patch more restricted; on the underside the markings are less prominent.

— Watson

== Habits ==
This butterfly is crepuscular.
