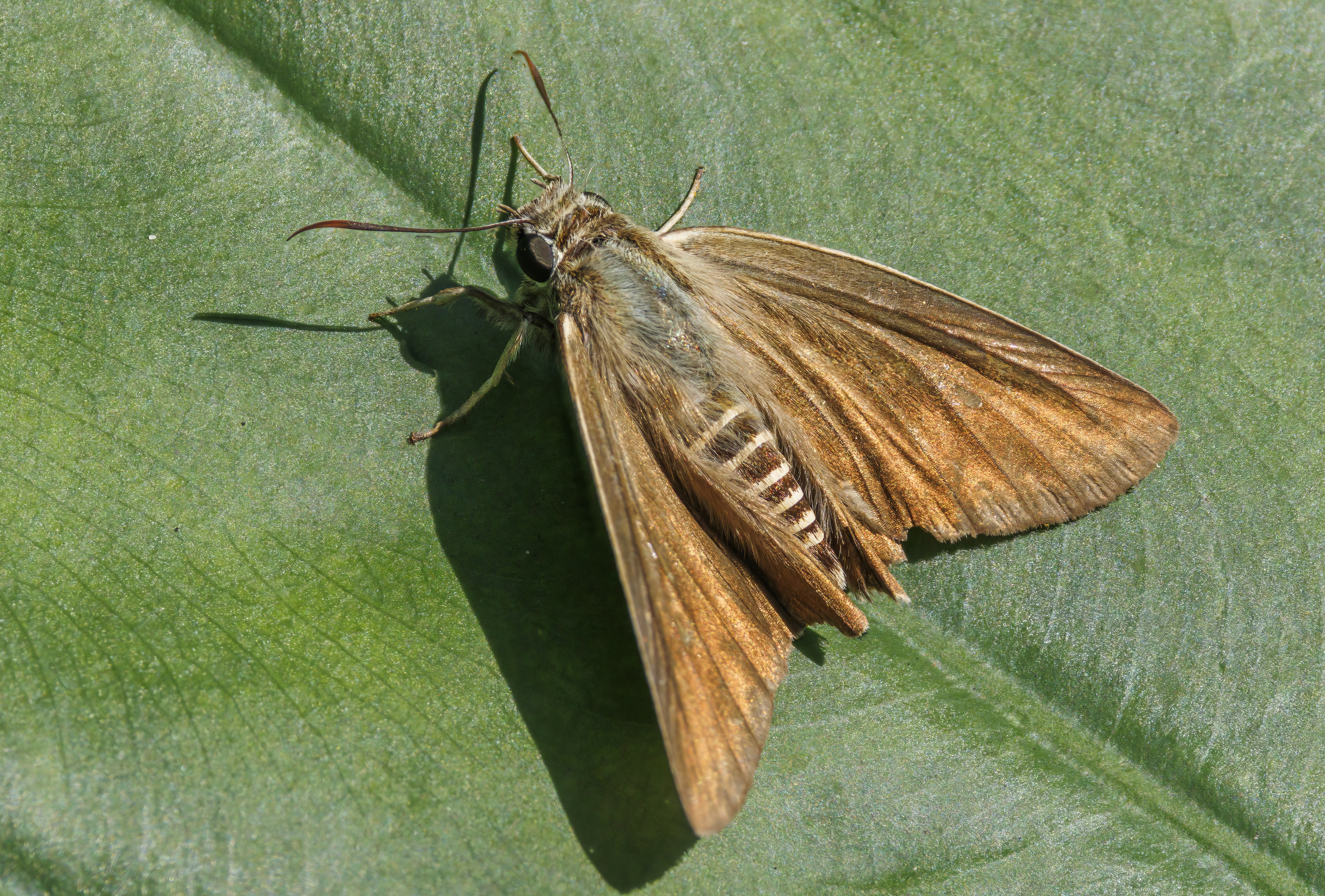

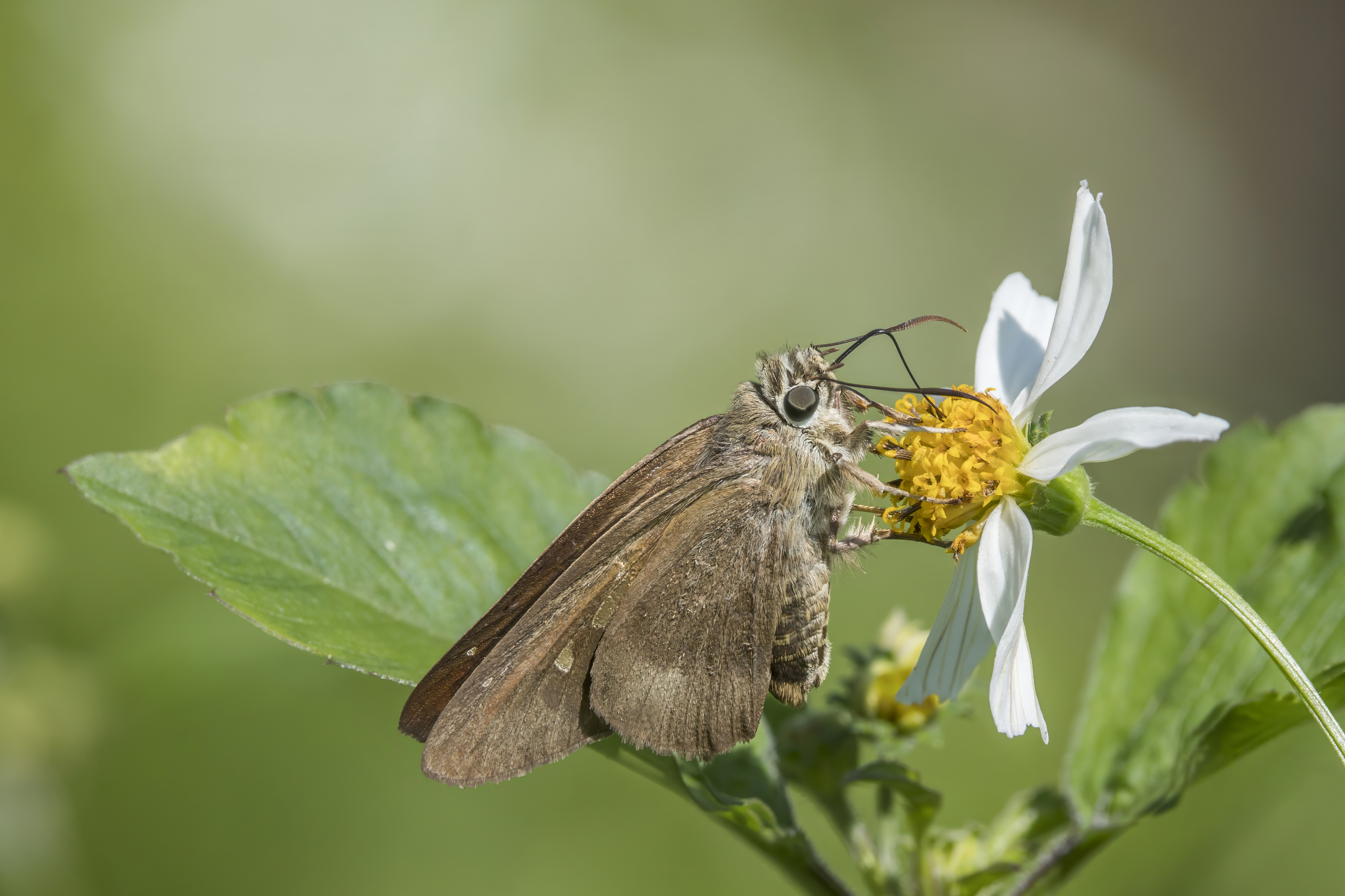
- Both in Taiwan

Scientific classification
- Kingdom: Animalia
- Phylum: Arthropoda
- Clade: Pancrustacea
- Class: Insecta
- Order: Lepidoptera
- Family: Hesperiidae
- Genus: Badamia
- Species: B. exclamationis

Binomial name
- Badamia exclamationis (Fabricius, 1775)

Synonyms
- Papilio exclamationis Fabricius, 1775; Papilio ladon Cramer, [1780] (preocc.); Hesperia ericus Fabricius, 1798; Calpodes forulus Hübner, [1819]; Ismene thymbron Felder, 1860

= Badamia exclamationis =

Species of butterfly

Badamia exclamationis, commonly known as the brown awl or narrow-winged awl, is a butterfly belonging to the family Hesperiidae. It is found in south and southeast Asia, Australia, and Oceania.

== Range ==
The brown awl is found in Sri Lanka, India, Myanmar, Cambodia, South Yunnan, Australia and Japan. This butterfly is found throughout the Indian subcontinent and in the Andaman Islands. The type locality is South India.

== Status ==
As per William Harry Evans (1932), the butterfly is common in India and rare in the Andaman Islands. Mark Alexander Wynter-Blyth (1957) records it as "Not Rare" and "Locally Common". Krushnamegh Kunte (2000) reports it as common in deciduous forests during the monsoon months and the evergreen forests in the following months.

== Habits ==
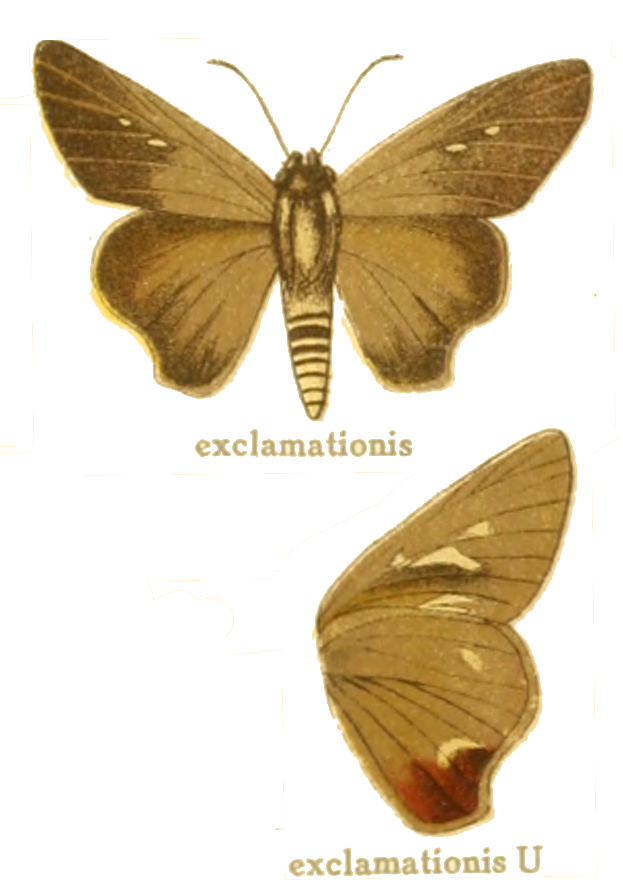
Characteristic wing shape

A forest butterfly, the brown awl favours openings and edges of deciduous and evergreen forests while its caterpillars are to be found in moist deciduous and semi-evergreen forests. It flies about either late or early in the morning in the shade of the jungles. It can be sometimes seen in bright sunlight visiting flowers, such as Glycosmis, Buddleia, Chromolaena and Lantana, but is very wary and energetic at such times, moving jerkily and rapidly between flowers or across inflorescences. It can also be seen mud-puddling or at bird droppings.

During a population explosion, like those of the common banded awl (Hasora chromus), the caterpillars of the brown awl may strip away all their food supply forcing the butterflies to migrate to other places where a fresh supply of host plants is available and even to other habitats such as shrubs, grasslands and gardens.

The brown awl flies as low as 6 feet over the bushes or as high as 60 to 75 feet in the canopy. The adults feed at lower levels on flowers of shrubs and small trees, but ascend to higher reaches of the vegetation to lay eggs or to bask, which it does very occasionally, holding its wings flat with the forewings covering the hindwings thus giving an arrowhead effect. The flight of the butterfly is fast and bounding with an audible wing beat.

When inactive, it rests on the undersides of leaves in shady forest spots, with the head pointing downwards. If disturbed it will generally buzz around energetically before returning to the same spot to rest.

== Description ==
The brown awl is a non-descript brown butterfly, darker above and lighter below. The sexes are alike, except for three to four semi-transparent spots on the forewing which cannot be differentiated in the field. The skipper has a light-brown abdomen with black bands across it. The dry-season form is usually smaller, paler, and may not have the forewing spots.

This skipper is unmistakable because of its long and narrow wings. It has the longest wings in proportion to breadth of all Indian butterflies.

=== Detailed description ===
Edward Yerbury Watson (1891) gives a detailed description:

Genus characters

Forewing, narrow, elongated; costa slightly arched at base, exterior margin very oblique and slightly convex below the apex; cell very long and narrow, extending three-fourths the wing; first subcostal branch emitted at two-fifths, second at one-fifth, third at one-seventh, fourth close to and fifth at end of the cell; disco-cellulars very slender, inwardly oblique, of nearly equal length, upper bent inward close to subcostal; upper radial from the angle, lower from their middle; median branches curved at their base, middle branch emitted at about one-fourth, and lower at three-fourths before end of the cell; submedian curved in the middle; hindwing short; apex very convex, angularly lobed at anal angle, abdominal margin short; precostal projecting inward; costal vein arched upward from the base; second subcostal emitted at one-third from the base; cell broad throughout; disco-cellulars very slender, scarcely visible, of equal length; radial from their angle, very slender; middle median at about one-third, and lower at one-fifth from the base; submedian straight, internal slightly curved. Thorax stout; abdomen rather long, attenuated; head broad; palpi broad and flattened in front, bristly on outer edge, third joint long, projected forward, cylindrical; fore-tibiae tufted beneath, femora slightly pilose beneath; antennae with a lengthened club and long pointed tip.

— Watson

Species description

Upperside dark purplish brown, the base of both wings greyish olive brown.

Male. Forewing with three transparent slender yellow spots disposed longitudinally on the upper disc, the inner spot ending within the cell.

Female. Forewing with the spots larger, the middle spot oblique and irregularly angulated; a less distinct spot also above the middle of sub-median vein. Underside pale greyish brown: forewing with discal area darker brown, the spots as above, and pale ochreous posterior border: hindwing with a dark brown anal area bordered above by a short pale ochreous streak. Thorax greyish olive brown; abdomen dark brown with pale ochreous segmental bands; head and palpi in front pale ochreous with brown streaks; third joint of palpi brown; legs brown above, pale beneath.

— Watson

== Similar species ==
Unlike the other awls, the brown awl lacks the narrow white wing bands on the hindwings. The very distinctive characteristics of the brown awl are the characteristic shape of the body and the narrower wings than the other awls.

== Life cycle ==
=== Eggs ===
The brown awl lays many eggs on a single plant, one at a time, on the tips of fresh shoots. The dome-shaped egg is pale green with longitudinal ridges having fine beadings; a total 13 ridges in all.

=== Larva ===
The larva is a pale violaceous (violet) yellow, with numerous black transverse dorsal lines; the prolegs are whitish encircled with black. The head is yellow, approximately heart shaped, with a black band and many tiny black spots.

On hatching the larva webs the edges of leaves together with silk to form a roomy cell from a leaf in which it resides throughout the larval stage. When disturbed, it can move quite briskly and even drop off. The caterpillars of the brown awl grow faster than most of those of other families, and have moist, sticky droppings.

At the time of pupation they descend close to the ground, looking for suitable spots to pupate. The caterpillar constructs a tubular cell from a leaf by drawing the edges together with thick strands of silk. In this cell, the caterpillar prepares an extensive silk bed on which it sits awaiting pupation. The freshly formed pupa clings onto the silken pad almost immediately.

=== Pupa ===
The pupa is stubby, with protruding eyes and a prominent projection on the head in between them. The pupa may be light brown or violaceous. The body tapers away from the shoulders towards the rear. The abdomen is creamish with a row of four black spots on each side. The pupa is shiny, but plastered with a white powder.

=== Host plants ===
The caterpillars have been recorded on the following deciduous and semi-evergreen forest plants, mostly from the family Combretaceae:

- Large climbing shrubs of Combretum such as Combretum albidum, Combretum latifolium and Combretum ovalifolium.
- Large forest trees of genus Terminalia such as Terminalia bellerica, Terminalia catappa and Terminalia oblongata.
- Anogeissus acuminata and Chionanthus purpureus.
- Hiptage benghalensis (Malpighiaceae)
- Linociera purpurea.
- Ficus spp.

== Gallery ==
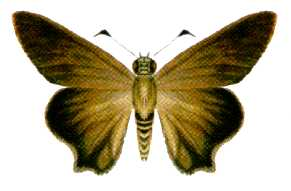
Brown awl

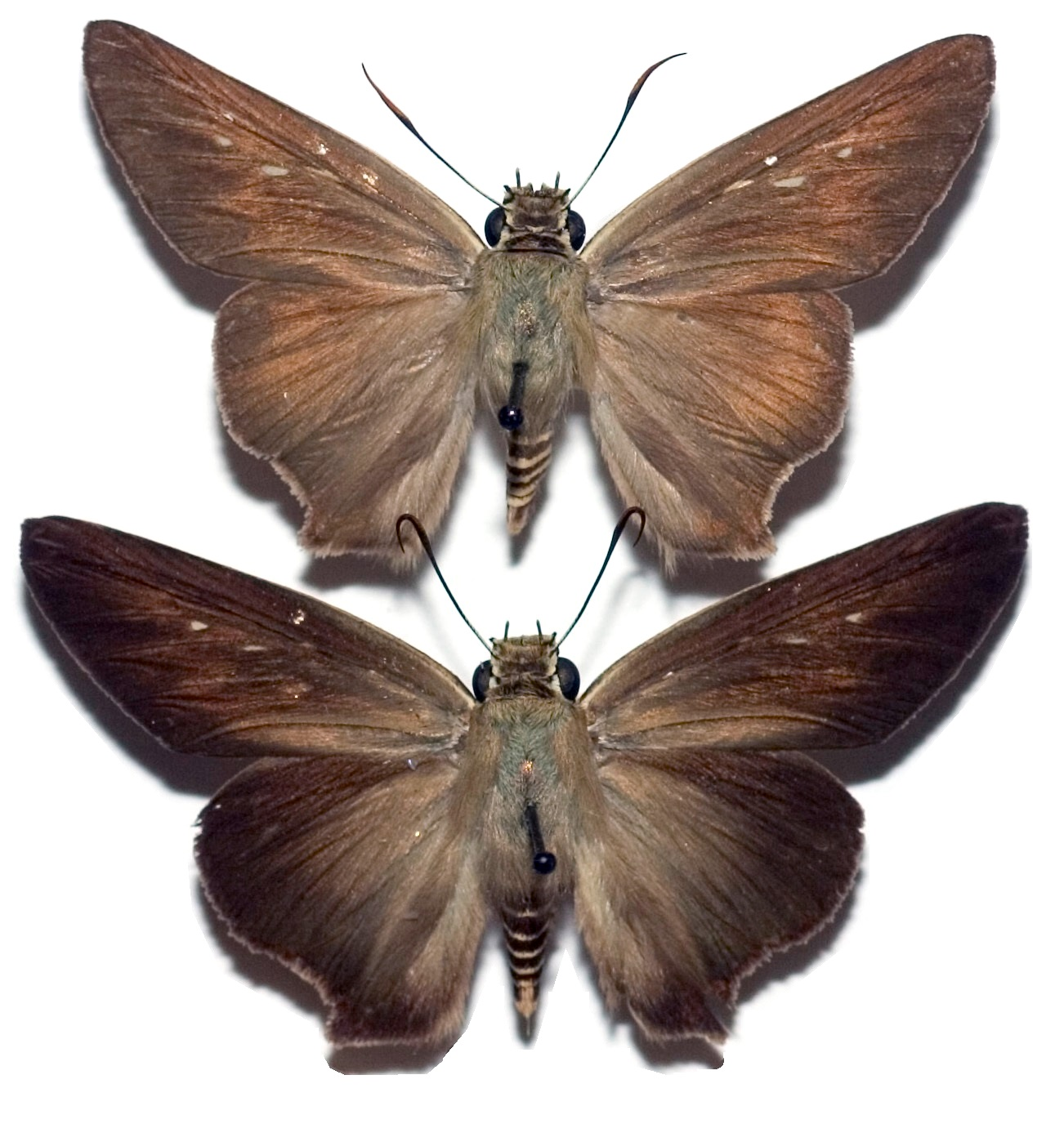
Museum specimens

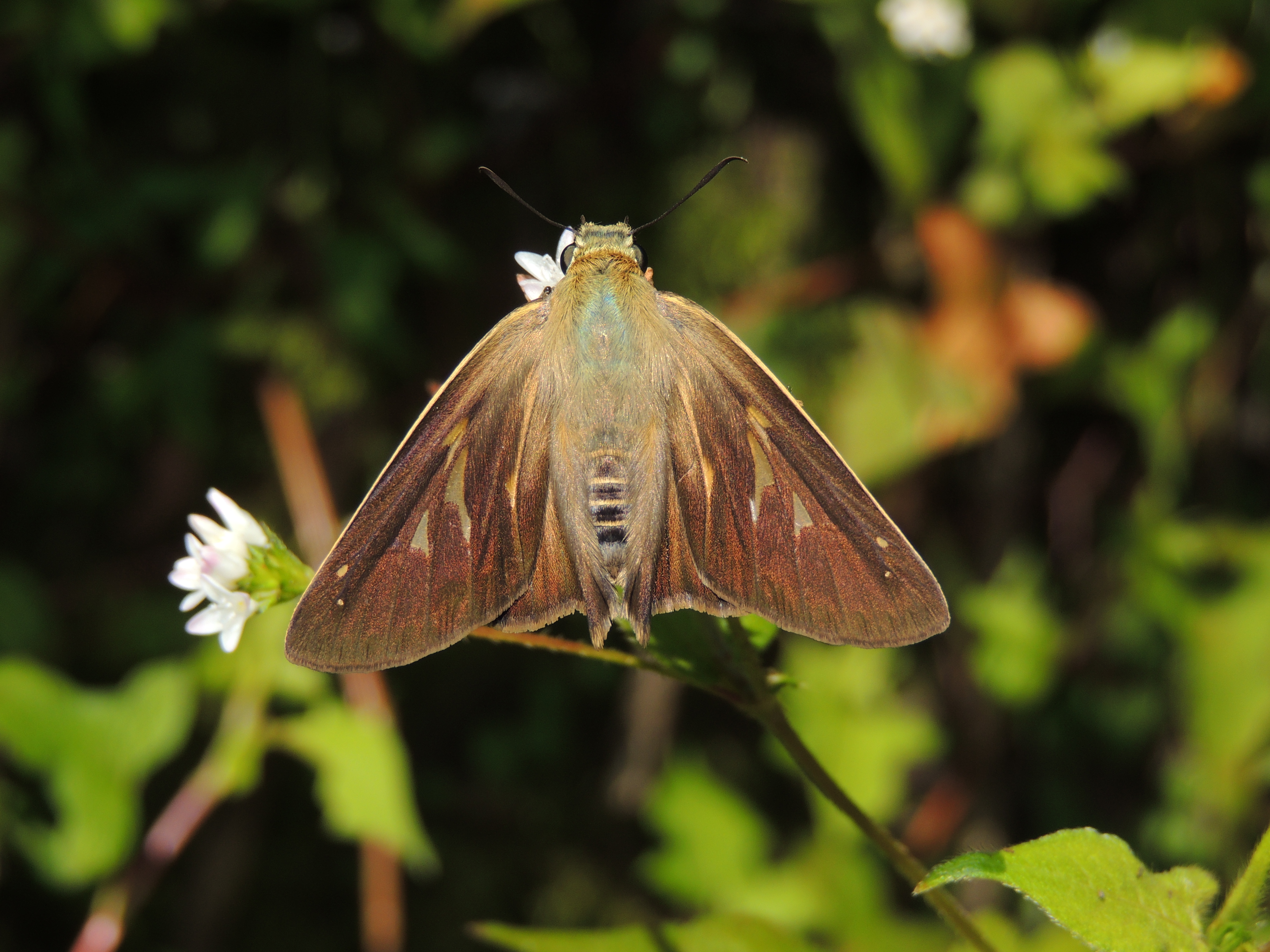
Dorsal view

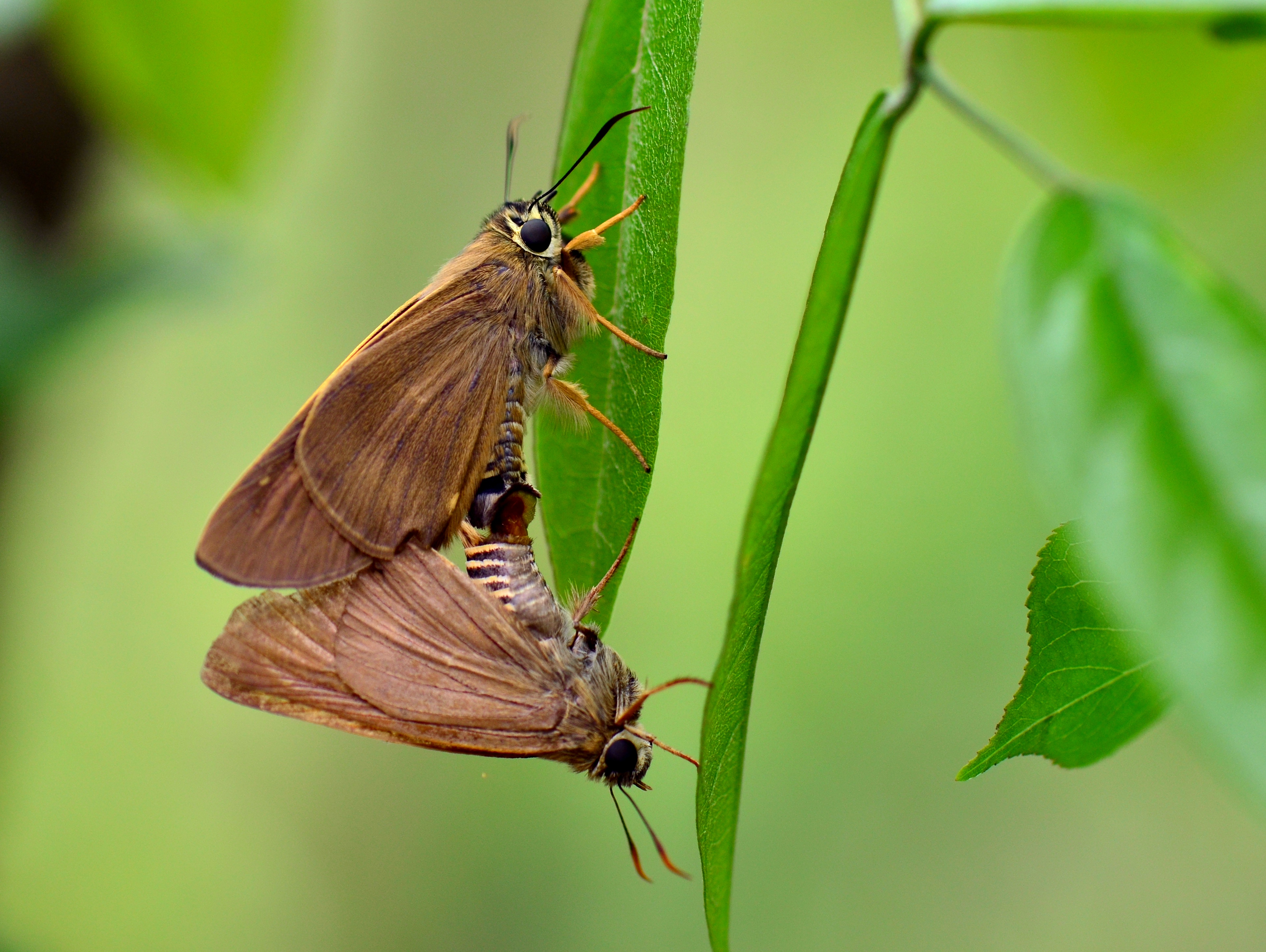
Mating pair

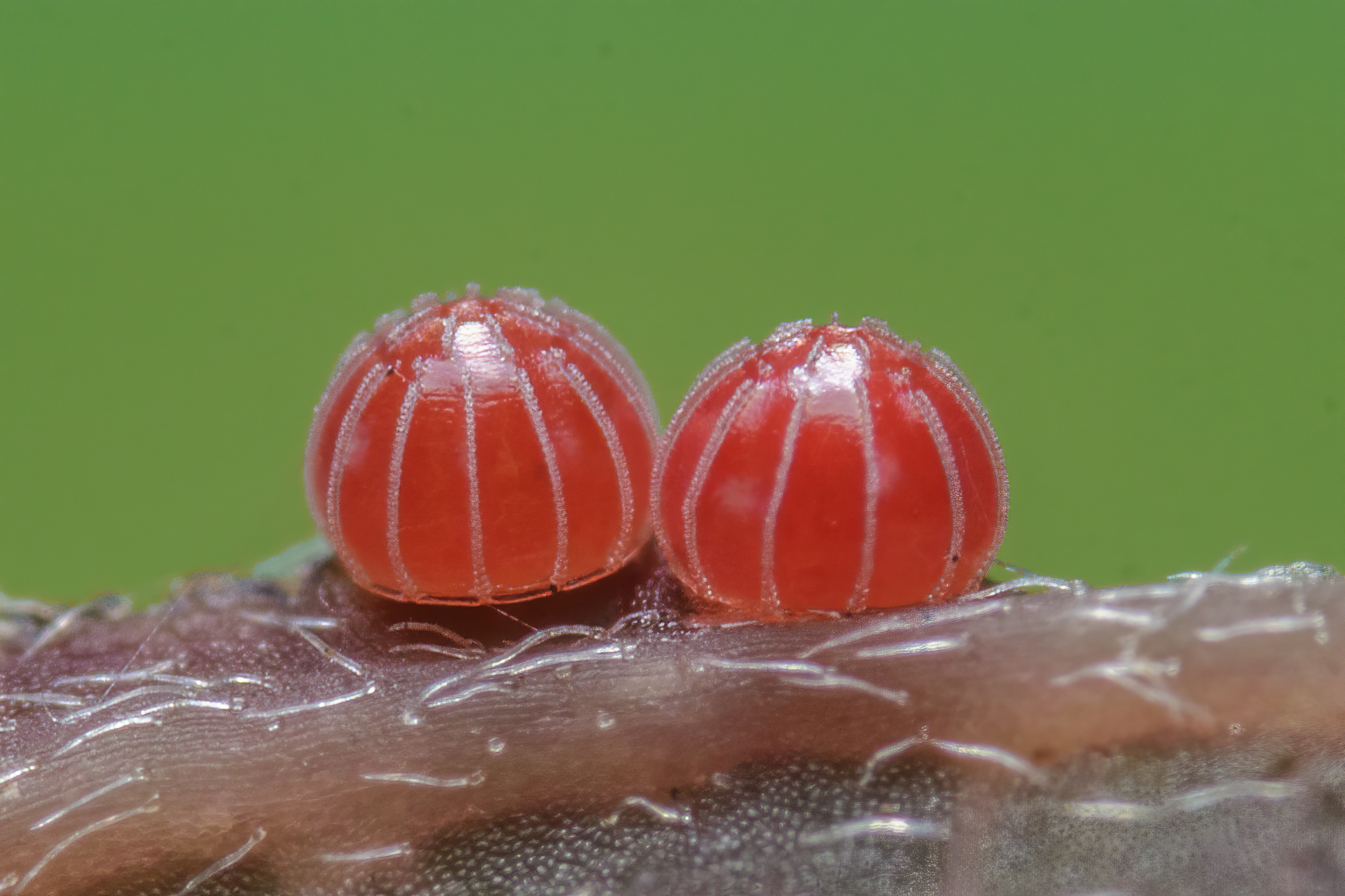
Mature eggs

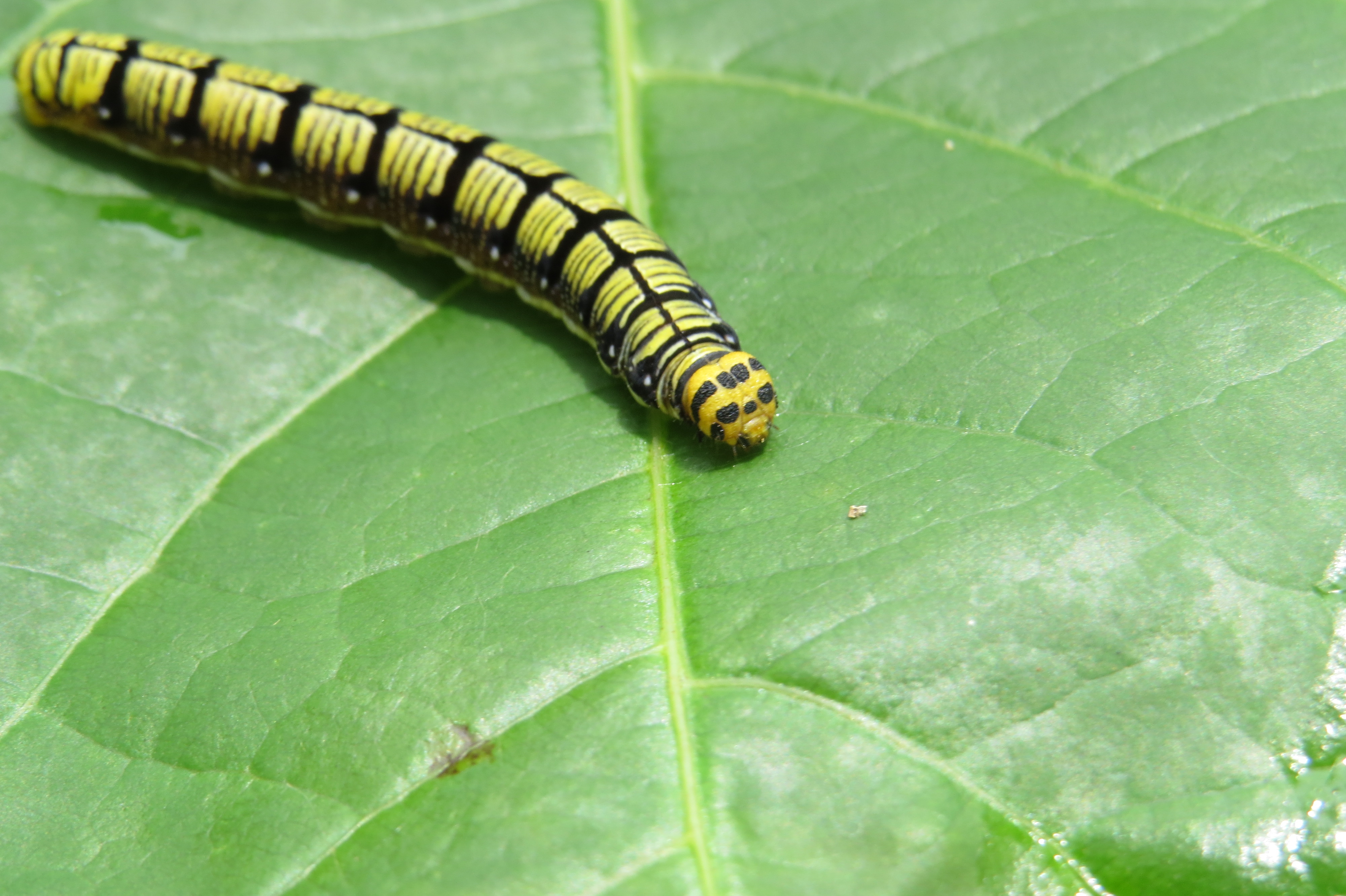
Caterpillar. Mayyil, India.

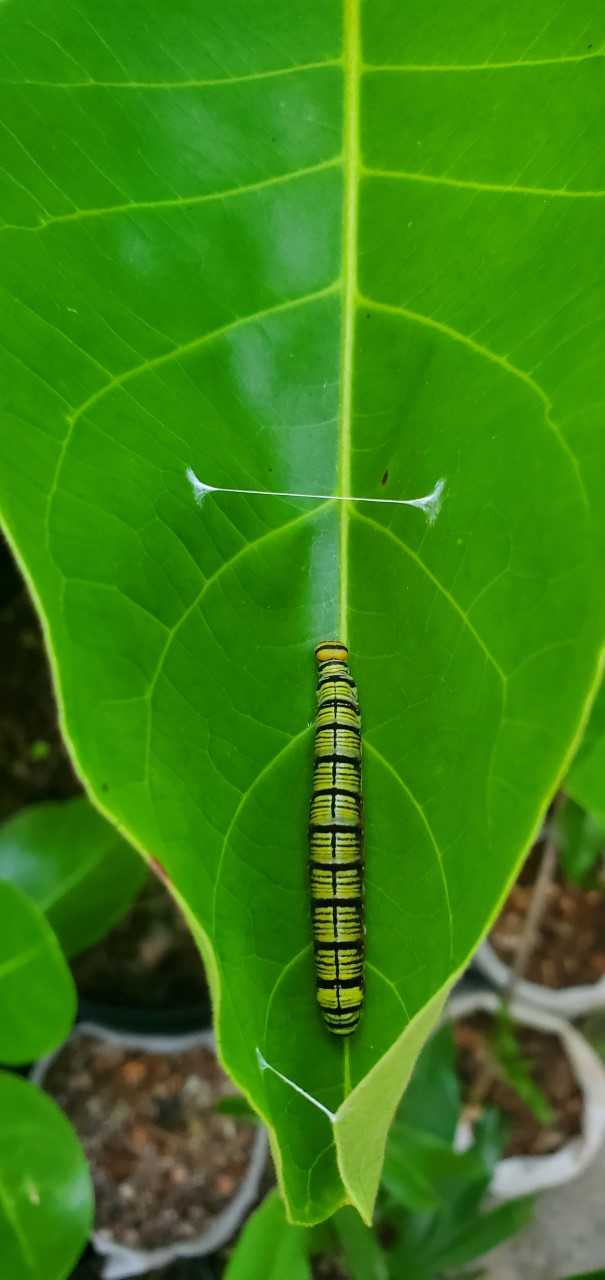
Beginning its encasing with silk strands on Terminalia catappa leaf. Dededo, Guam

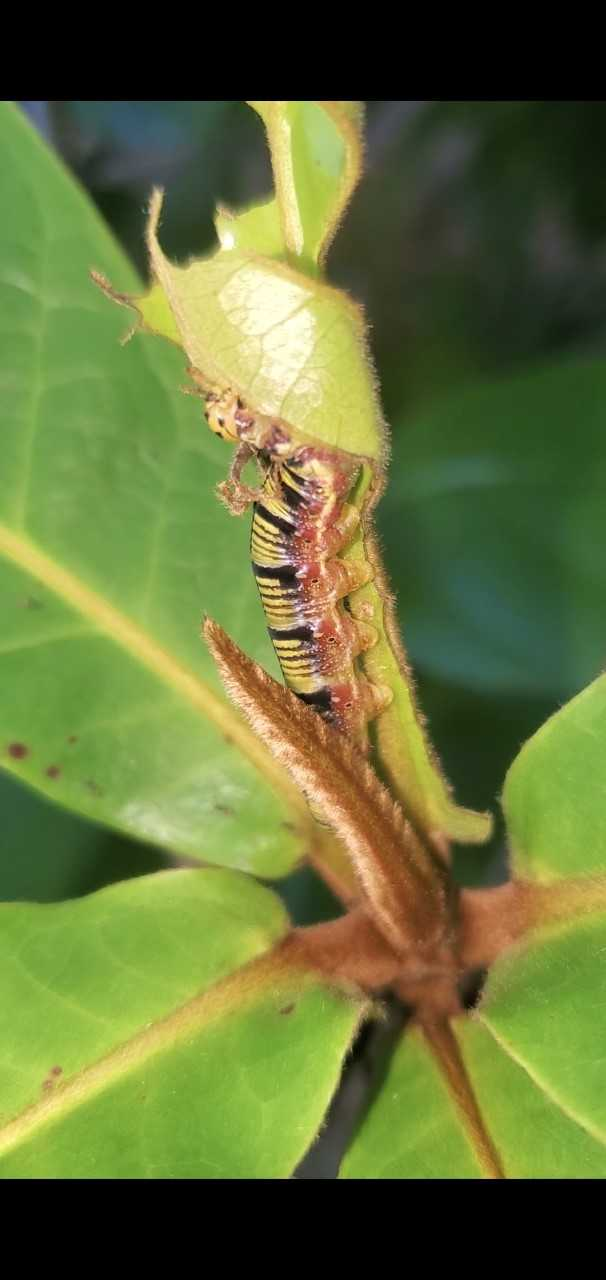
Caterpillar eating Terminalia catappa leaf, lateral view. Dededo, Guam

== See also ==
- Coeliadinae
- List of butterflies of India (Coeliadinae)
- List of butterflies of India (Hesperiidae)

== Bibliography ==
- Beccaloni, George; Scoble, Malcolm; Kitching, Ian; Simonsen, Thomas; Robinson, Gaden; Pitkin, Brian; Hine, Adrian; Lyal, Chris. "The Global Lepidoptera Names Index (LepIndex)". Natural History Museum, London.
- Brower, Andrew V. Z. and Warren, Andrew, (2007). Coeliadinae Evans 1937. Version 21 February 2007 (temporary). http://tolweb.org/Coeliadinae/12150/2007.02.21 in The Tree of Life Web Project, http://tolweb.org/
- Evans, W.H. (1932). The Identification of Indian Butterflies (2nd ed.). Mumbai, India: Bombay Natural History Society.
- Kunte, Krushnamegh (2000). Butterflies of Peninsular India. India, A Lifescape. Hyderabad, India: Universities Press. ISBN 978-8173713545.
- "Markku Savela's website on Lepidoptera".
- Watson, E. Y. (1891) Hesperiidae indicae. Vest and Co. Madras.
- Wynter-Blyth, Mark Alexander (1957). Butterflies of the Indian Region. Bombay, India: Bombay Natural History Society. ISBN 978-8170192329.
