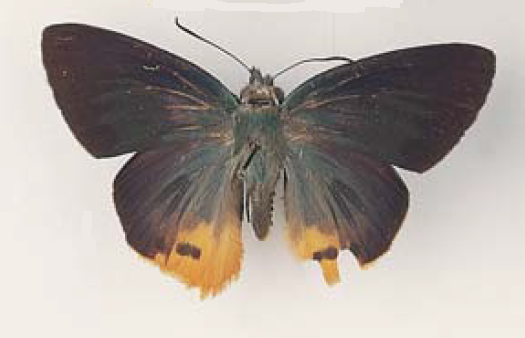

Scientific classification
- Kingdom: Animalia
- Phylum: Arthropoda
- Clade: Pancrustacea
- Class: Insecta
- Order: Lepidoptera
- Family: Hesperiidae
- Genus: Choaspes
- Species: C. plateni

Binomial name
- Choaspes plateni (Staudinger, 1888)

= Choaspes plateni =

Branded awlking

Species of butterfly

Choaspes plateni, commonly known as the branded awlking, is a species of butterfly belonging to the family Hesperiidae. It is found in Asia. Known food plants include Meliosma (Meliosmaceae) and Pometia (Sapindaceae)

== Range ==
The branded awlking is found in India (Sikkim, Assam), southern Myanmar (including Mergui), Malaysia, the Indonesian archipelago (including Borneo, Sumatra, Nias, Bangka, Palawan), Thailand, Laos, Vietnam and Hainan, China.

== Status ==
Rare.

== See also ==
- Coeliadinae
- Hesperiidae
- List of butterflies of India (Coeliadinae)
- List of butterflies of India (Hesperiidae)
