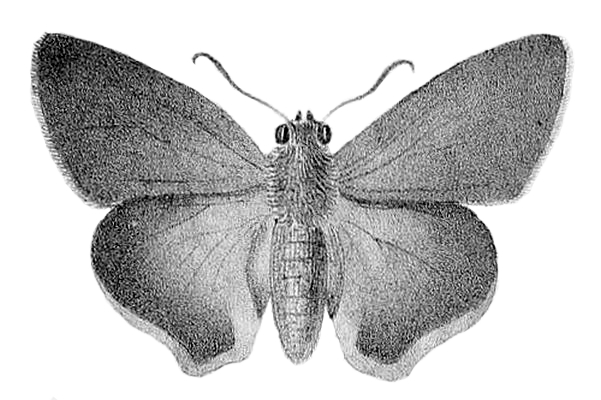
- Choanthes xanthopogon in Charles von Hügel's Reise durch Kaschmir und das Himaleygebirge gesammelten Insekten

Scientific classification
- Kingdom: Animalia
- Phylum: Arthropoda
- Clade: Pancrustacea
- Class: Insecta
- Order: Lepidoptera
- Family: Hesperiidae
- Genus: Choaspes
- Species: C. xanthopogon

Binomial name
- Choaspes xanthopogon (Kollar, 1844)

= Choaspes xanthopogon =

Similar awlking

Species of butterfly

Choaspes xanthopogon, the similar awlking, is a species of butterfly belonging to the family Hesperiidae.

== Range ==
The similar awlking is found in India along the Himalayas from Kashmir to Nepal, Sikkim and Assam, Myanmar, western China and possibly Borneo.

== Status ==
William Harry Evans wrote that the taxon similis is rare. Taxon similis is a synonym for xanthopogon, see previous notes.

== See also ==
- Coeliadinae
- Hesperiidae
- List of butterflies of India (Coeliadinae)
- List of butterflies of India (Hesperiidae)
