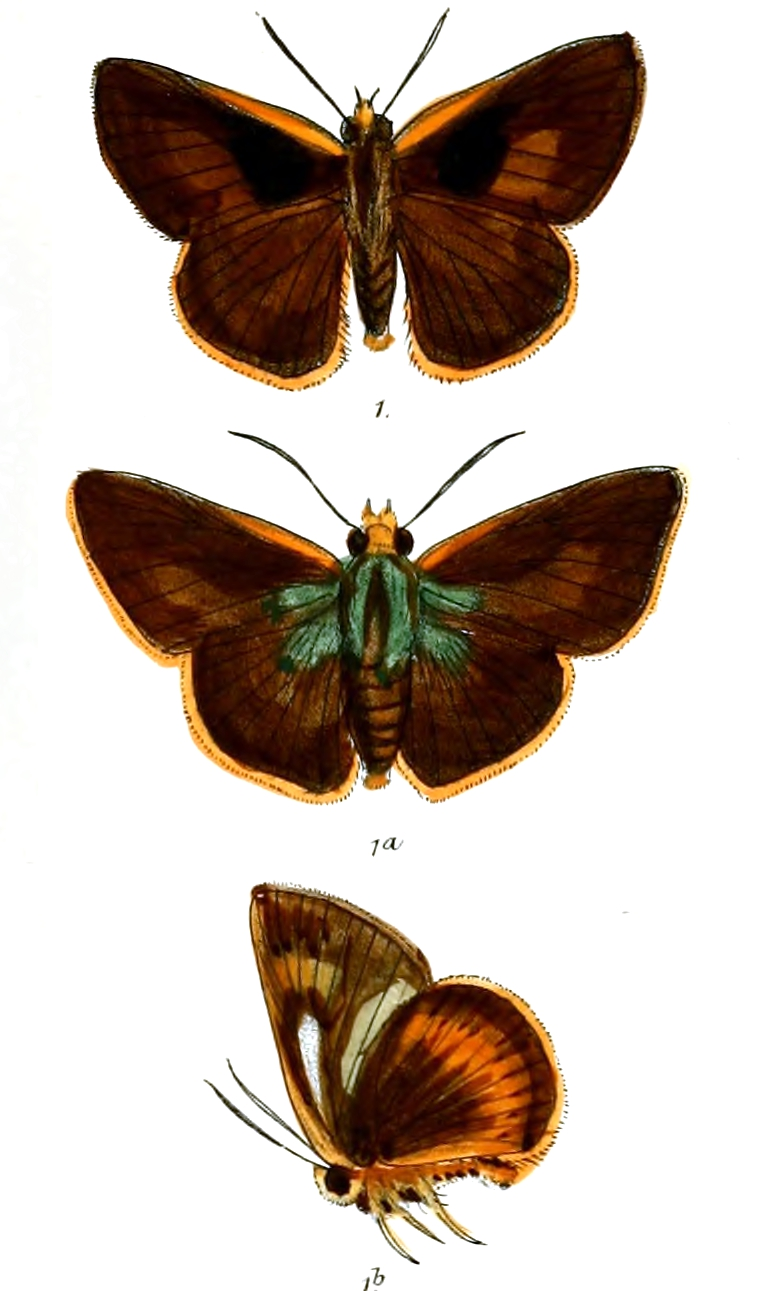
- From top: male, female, and male underside

Scientific classification
- Domain: Eukaryota
- Kingdom: Animalia
- Phylum: Arthropoda
- Class: Insecta
- Order: Lepidoptera
- Family: Hesperiidae
- Genus: Burara
- Species: B. oedipodea

Binomial name
- Burara oedipodea (Swainson, 1820)

Synonyms
- Ismene oedipodea Swainson, 1820; Bibasis oedipodea (Swainson, 1820)

= Burara oedipodea =

Species of butterfly

Burara oedipodea, the branded orange awlet, is a species of hesperid butterfly found in South Asia and Southeast Asia. The butterfly was reassigned to the genus Burara by Vane-Wright and de Jong (2003) and is considered by them to be Burara oedipodea.

== Range ==
The branded orange awlet is found in India, Sri Lanka, Myanmar, Malaysia, Java, Thailand and Vietnam. In India, the butterfly is found along the Himalayas from Mussoorie to Assam. The type locality is Java in Indonesia.

== Description ==
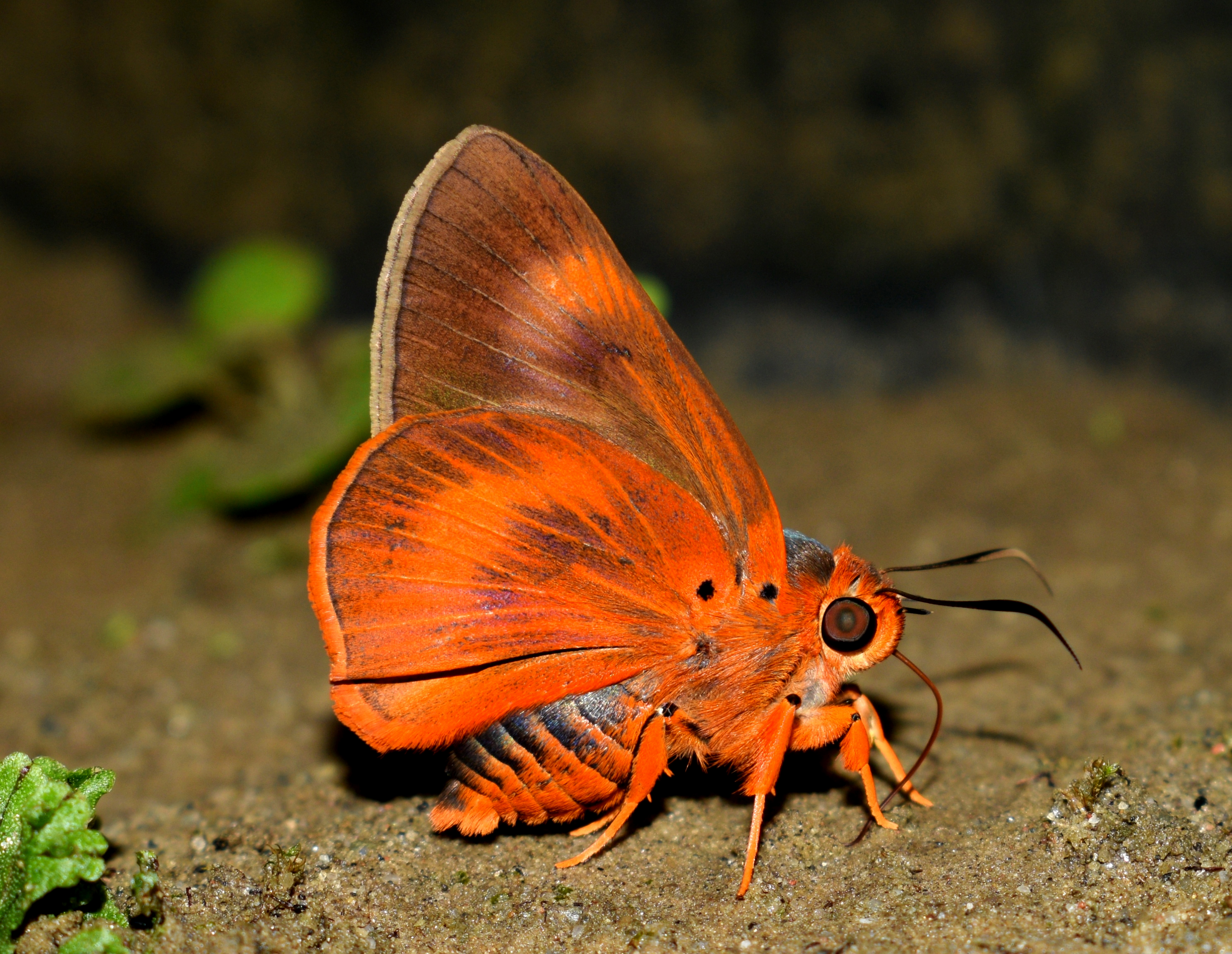
Close wing position of Burara oedipodea Swainson, 1820 – Branded Orange Awlet

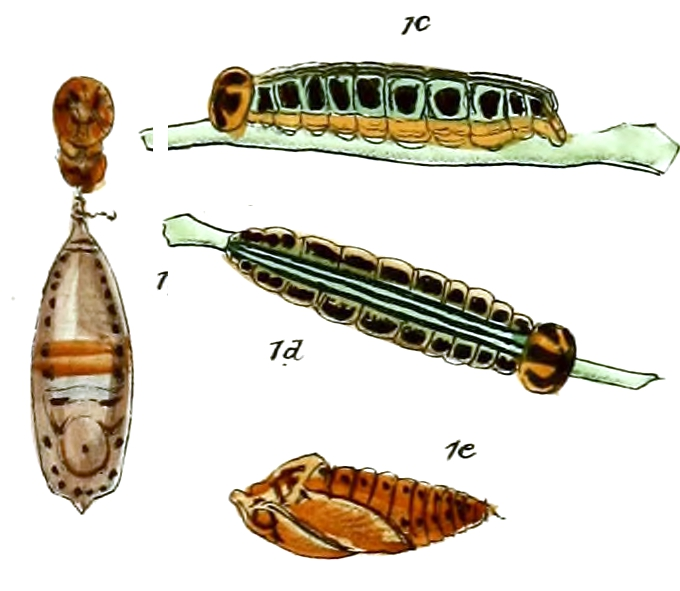
Larvae and pupae

The butterfly has a wingspan of 40 to 50 mm for subspecies ataphus found in Sri Lanka, and of 65 to 70 mm in subspecies excellens found in Sulawesi.

Edward Yerbury Watson (1891) gives a detailed description:

Male. Upperside ochreous olive brown; forewing with an ochreous-red costal band which also extends across base of the cell; a large black basal patch below the cell. Cilia of forewing pale brownish grey, of hindwing ochreous-red.

Female. It differs above only in the absence of the basal black patch, and beneath it in the less prominent white posterior marginal band. Underside ochreous-brown: forewing with a paler ochreous subapical and a marginal fascia, and a broad whitish posterior band: hindwing with bright ochreous red longitudinal streak between the veins, broadest between the median and submedian veins and abdominal margin; a small black spot at the base above the costal vein. Thorax in front, head, palpi, body beneath, and legs ochreous-red; terminal joint of palpi brown.

== Biology ==
This butterfly is crepuscular. The larva have been recorded on Hiptage benghalensis and Combretum latifolium.
