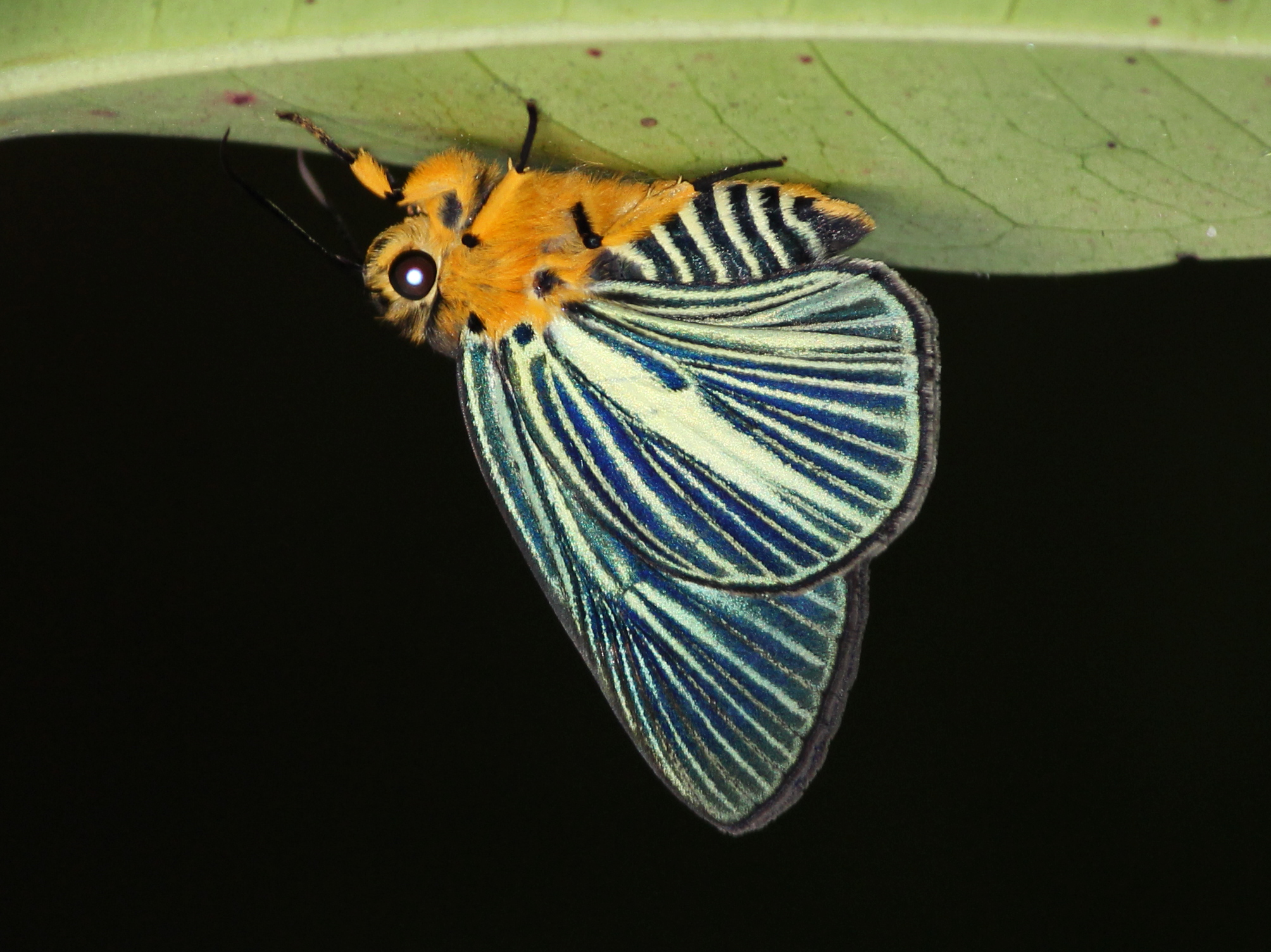

Scientific classification
- Kingdom: Animalia
- Phylum: Arthropoda
- Clade: Pancrustacea
- Class: Insecta
- Order: Lepidoptera
- Family: Hesperiidae
- Genus: Burara
- Species: B. gomata

Binomial name
- Burara gomata (Moore, 1866)

Synonyms
- Ismene gomata Moore, 1866; Bibasis gomata (Moore, 1866); Burara gomata (Moore, 1866)

= Burara gomata =

Pale green awlet

Species of butterfly

Burara gomata, commonly known as the pale green awlet, is a butterfly belonging to the family Hesperiidae. It is found in Northeast India, the Western Ghats and parts of Southeast Asia. The butterfly was reassigned to genus Burara by Vane-Wright and de Jong (2003) and is considered by them to be Burara gomata (Moore, 1865). This revised scheme was reflected by review of morphology in Chiba, 2009, and genomic data in Toussaint et al. 2020.

== Range ==
The pale green awlet ranges from India, Myanmar, the Malay Peninsula, the Philippines, and the Indonesian archipelago. In India, the butterfly is found in South India up to North Kanara, and along the Himalayas from Sikkim to Assam and eastwards to Myanmar.

The type locality is Darjeeling in the north of West Bengal.

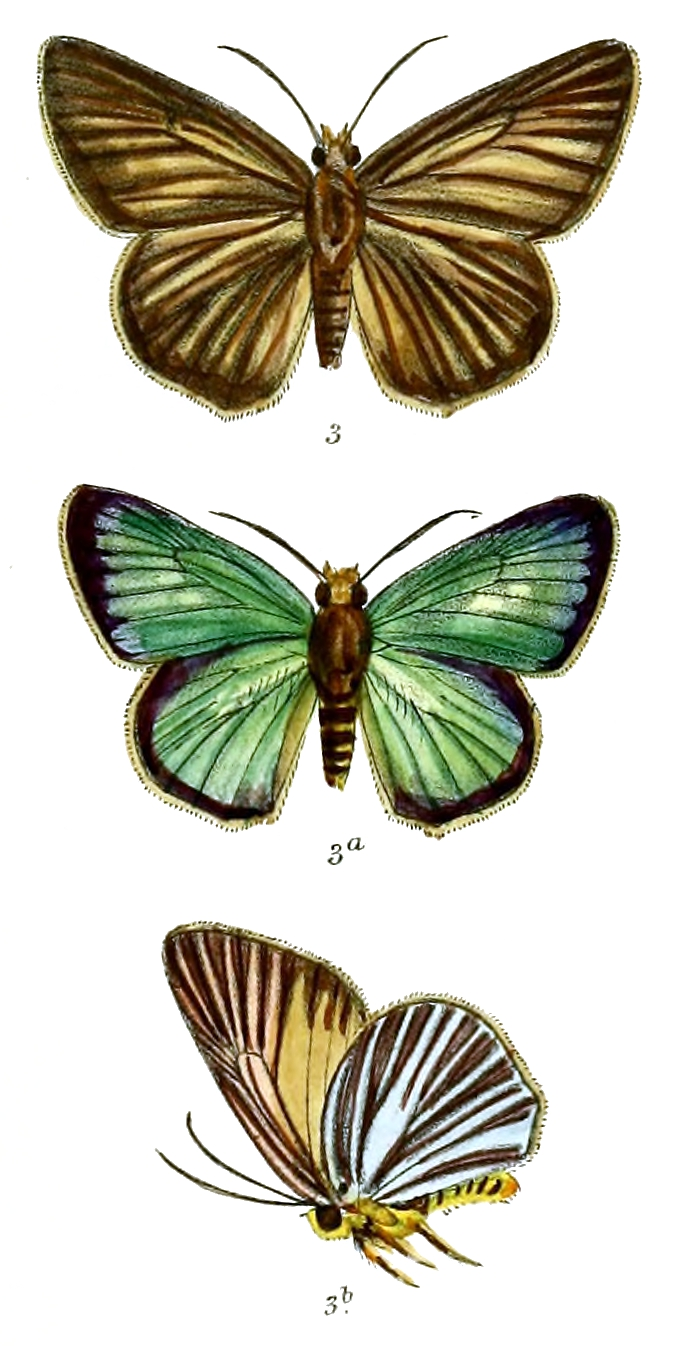
Male (top), female, male underside

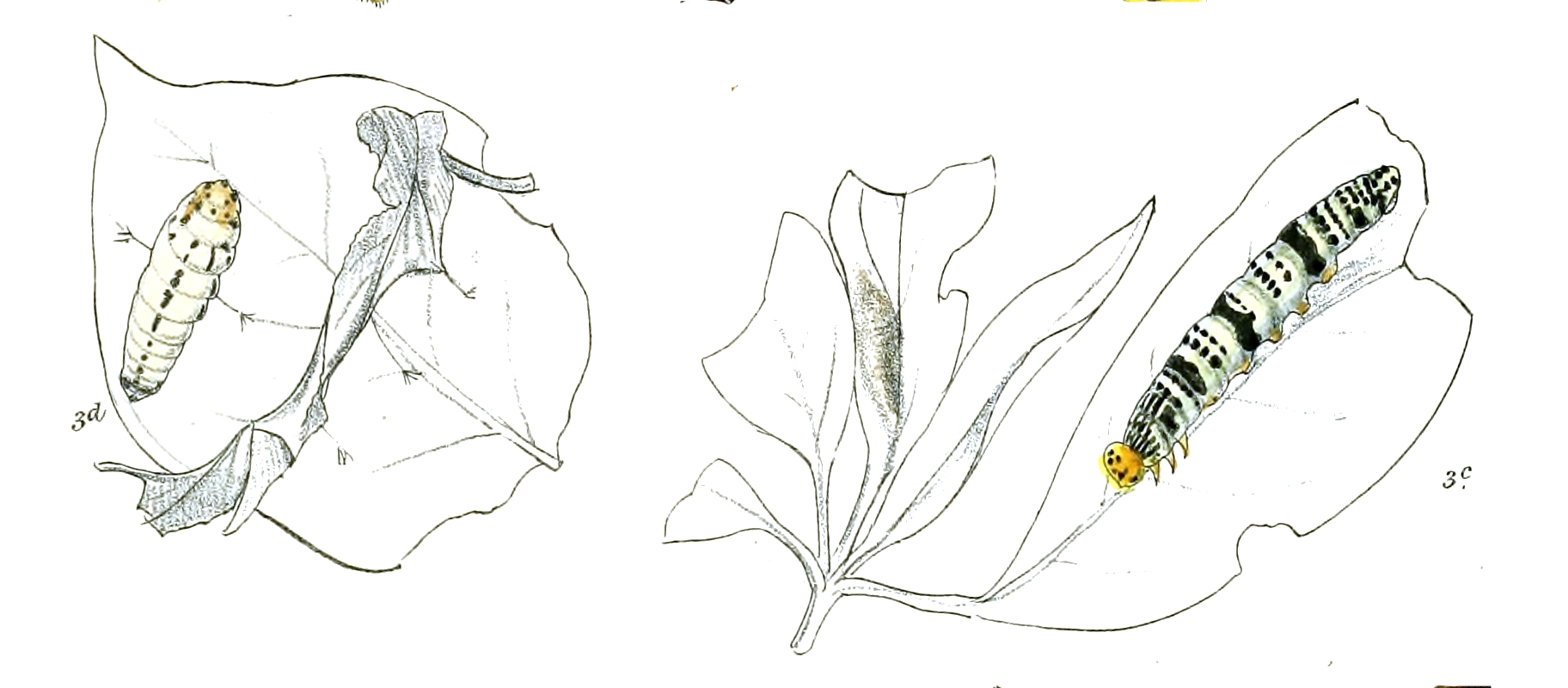
Larva and pupa

== Status ==
This species is rare in South India but not rare in the Himalayas.

== Description ==
The butterfly has a wingspan of 50 to 55 mm.

Edward Yerbury Watson (1891) gives a detailed description:

Male. Upperside pale vinaceous brown; both wings with pale brownish yellow streaks longitudinally between the veins. Abdomen blackish brown with yellowish bands. Cilia yellowish. Underside dark brown, with the veins and longitudinal streaks between them greyish green, the brown showing only along each side of the veins; posterior margin of forewing broadly pale vinaceous; exterior margin of both wings defined by a brown line. Third joint of palpi and edge of sides brown, the rest yellow. Thorax, legs and abdomen beneath orange yellow.

Female. Expanse 2.3 inches. Upperside very dark glossy bronzygreen, shading off into glossy indigo-blue at the apex and outer margin. Underside with the markings and ground-colour darker than in Sikkim males; forewing with a pale green spot in the second median interspace, with a larger one in the interspace below it, in the male these spots are merged in a large patch of the ochreous ground-colour from the inner margin. The green markings everywhere more restricted and of a darker shade than in the male.

— Watson

== Life history ==
The adult butterfly is crepuscular in activity. The larva has been recorded on Heptapleurum venulosum, Heptapleurum wallichianum, Embelia ribes var. ribes, Heptapleurum luridum, Heptapleurum heptaphyllum, Trevesia sundaica, and Horsfieldia species.

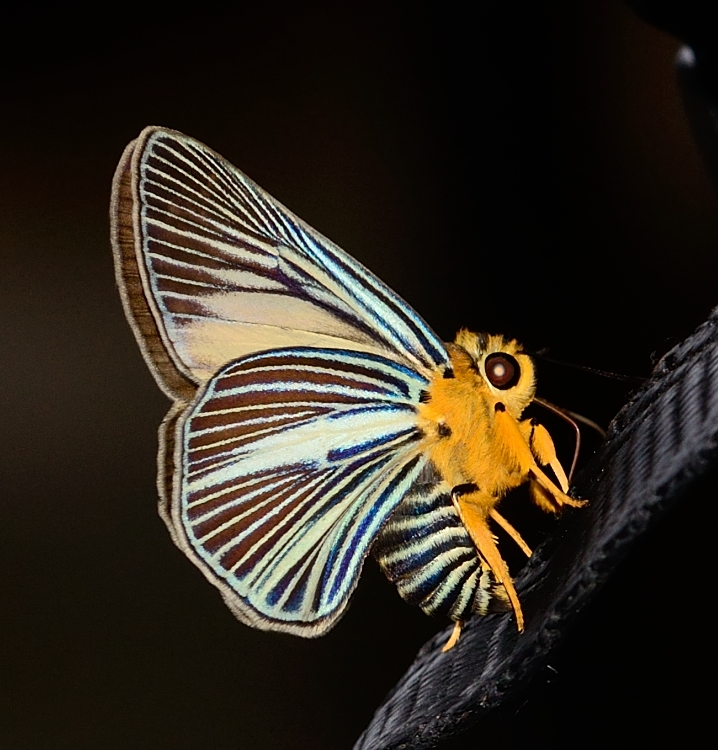
Picture taken at Gua Tempurung, Malaysia

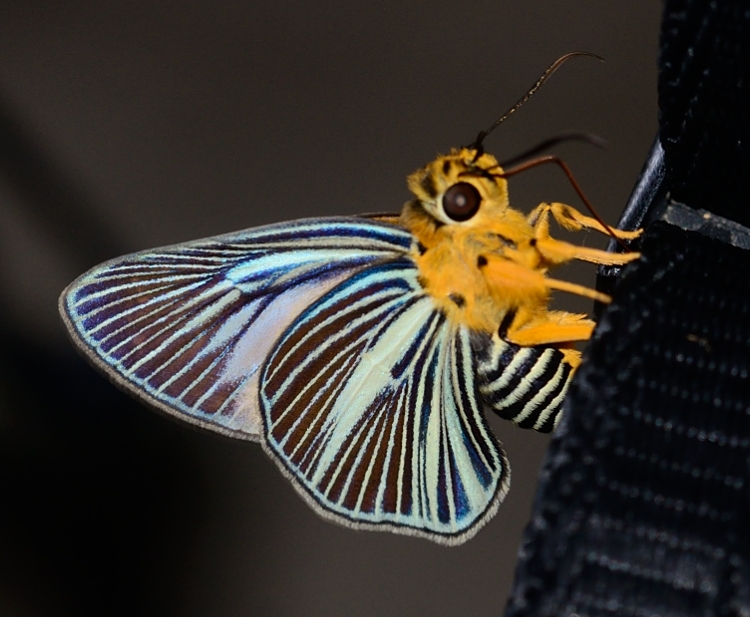
Picture taken at Gua Tempurung, Malaysia
