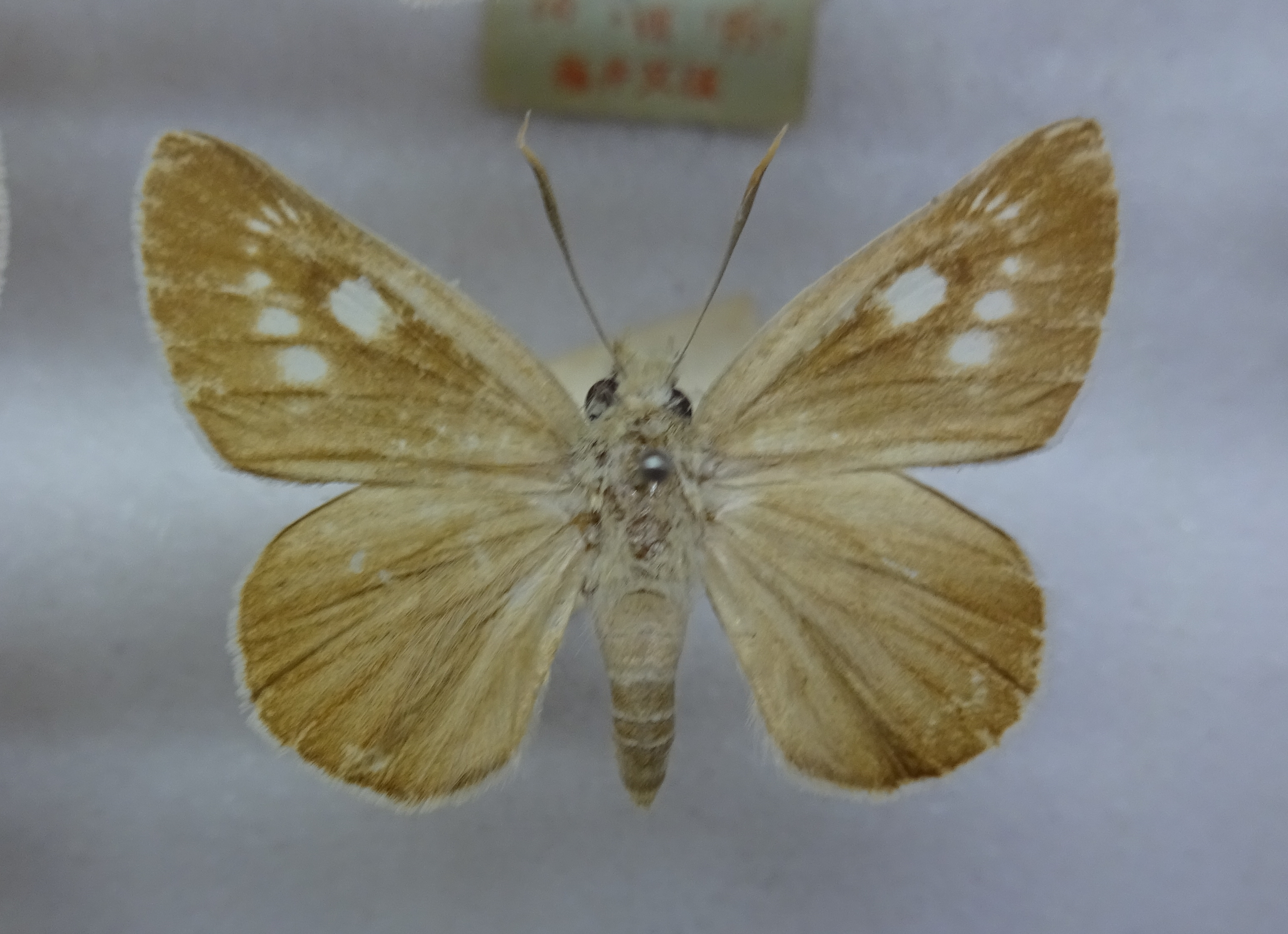

Scientific classification
- Kingdom: Animalia
- Phylum: Arthropoda
- Clade: Pancrustacea
- Class: Insecta
- Order: Lepidoptera
- Family: Hesperiidae
- Genus: Burara
- Species: B. aquilina

Binomial name
- Burara aquilina (Speyer, 1879)

Synonyms
- Ismene aquilina Speyer, 1879; Bibasis aquilina (Speyer, 1879); Proteides chrysaeglia Butler, [1882] Ismene jankowskii Oberthür, 1880

= Burara aquilina =

Species of butterfly

Burara aquilina is a Palearctic butterfly in the family Hesperiidae and the subfamily Coeliadinae. It is found in China, Amur and Japan.

The larva feeds on Kalopanax septemlobus.

== Subspecies ==
- B. a. aquilina (Speyer, 1879) (Russia)
- B. a. chrysaeglia (Butler, [1882]) (Japan)
- B. a. siola Evans, 1934 (China)
