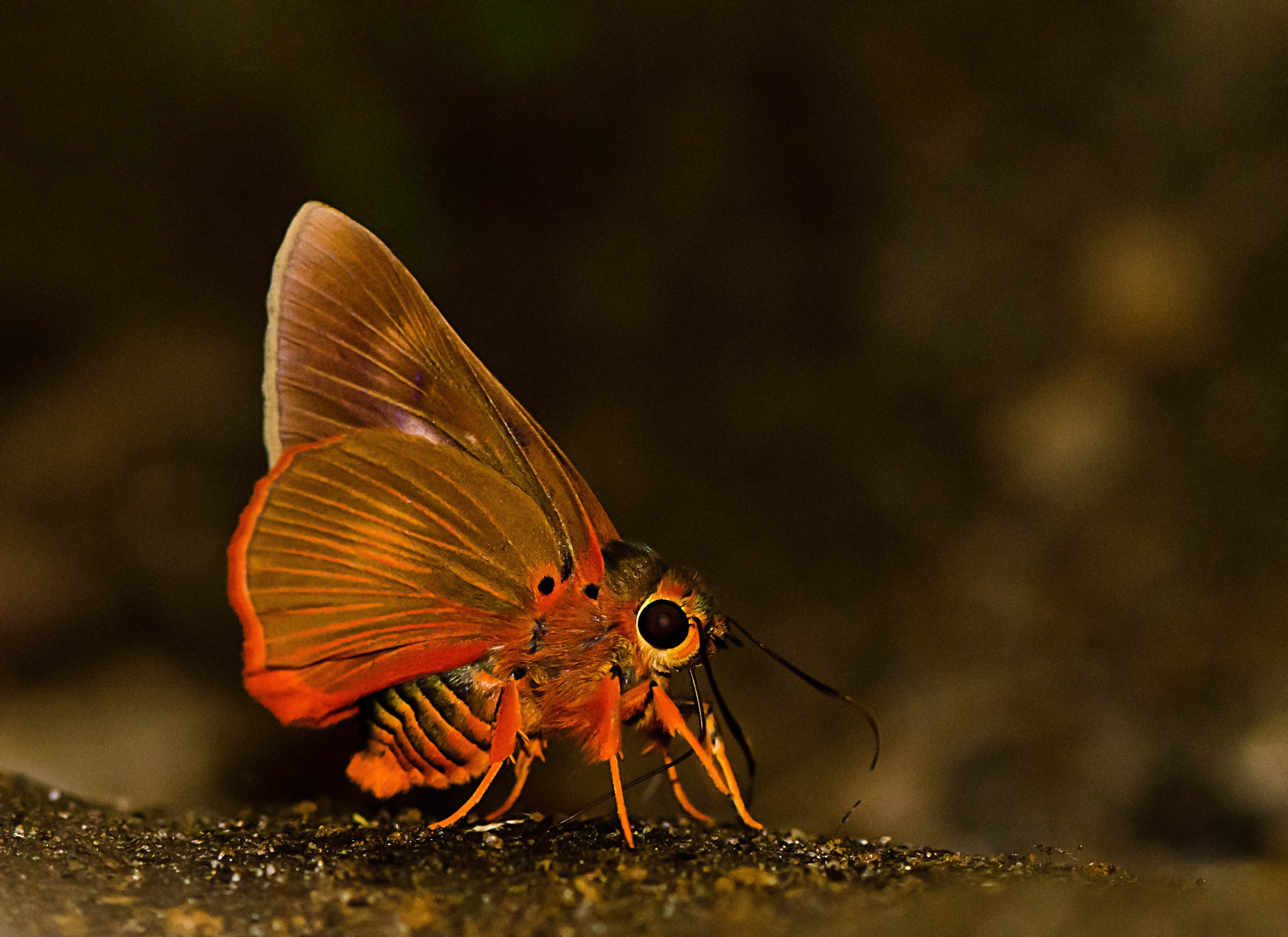

Scientific classification
- Kingdom: Animalia
- Phylum: Arthropoda
- Clade: Pancrustacea
- Class: Insecta
- Order: Lepidoptera
- Family: Hesperiidae
- Genus: Burara
- Species: B. jaina

Binomial name
- Burara jaina (Moore, [1866])

Synonyms
- Ismene jaina Moore, 1866; Bibasis jaina (Moore, 1866)

= Burara jaina =

Orange Awlet

Species of butterfly

Burara jaina, the orange awlet, is a species of hesperid butterfly found in Asia. The butterfly was reassigned to the genus Burara by Vane-Wright and de Jong (2003), and is considered Burara jaina by them.

== Range ==
The orange awlet is found in India, Myanmar, Thailand and Vietnam.

In India, this butterfly is found in the Western Ghats and the Himalayas from Garhwal (Mussoorie) to Sikkim and Assam eastwards to Myanmar.

The type locality is Darjeeling in West Bengal, India.

== Status ==
It is fairly common in Kodagu and Thenmala but rare elsewhere in India.

== Description ==
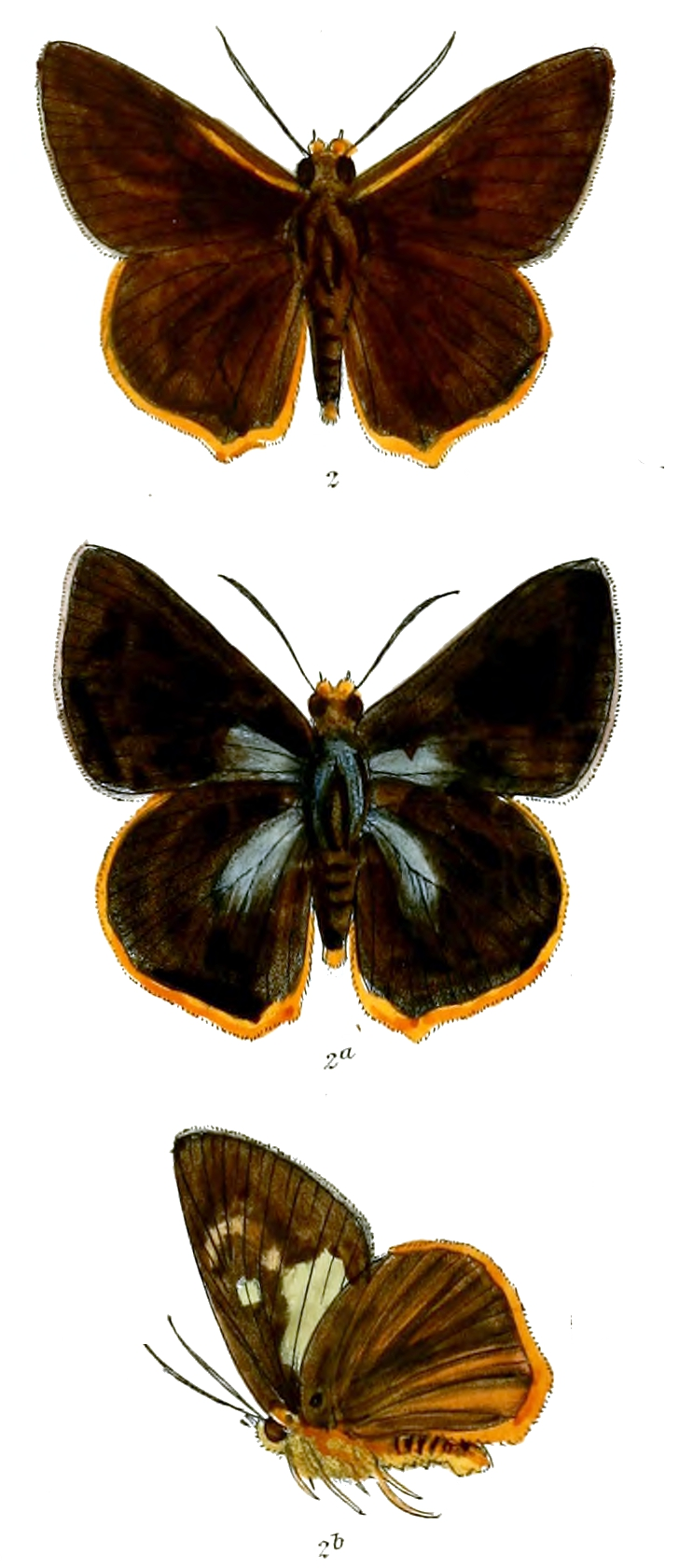
From top: male, female and male underside

Both sexes: The butterfly, which has a wingspan of 60 to 70 mm, is a dark vinaceous (colour of red wine) brown above. The forewing has an orange costal streak from the base above the cell to about halfway along the wing, while the hindwing has an orange fringe. The butterfly is paler below and has orange bands along the veins of the hindwing.

Male: The male may have an indistinct dark brand placed centrally on the forewing above, between mid 1b to vein 3.

Edward Yerbury Watson (1891) gives a detailed description, shown below:

Male. Upperside forewing with an orange red subcostal basal streak and an indistinct blackish patch beneath the cell; front of thorax, anal tuft, and cilia of hindwing bright orange red; thorax and base of abdomen clothed with bluish grey hairs. Underside paler brown; both wings with a small black orange red bordered basal spot: forewing with a well-defined purplish white spot within the cell; and a curved discal series of narrow less defined spots; posterior margin broadly yellow: hindwing with the veins towards the abdominal margin and cilia orange red; a curved ill-defined series of narrow purplish white discal streaks. Third joint of palpi brown; thorax beneath greyish; middle of abdomen beneath and sides of the bands and legs orange red. Female similar, but with darker bluish grey hairs without the orange red subcostal streak and black discal patch.

Life cycle

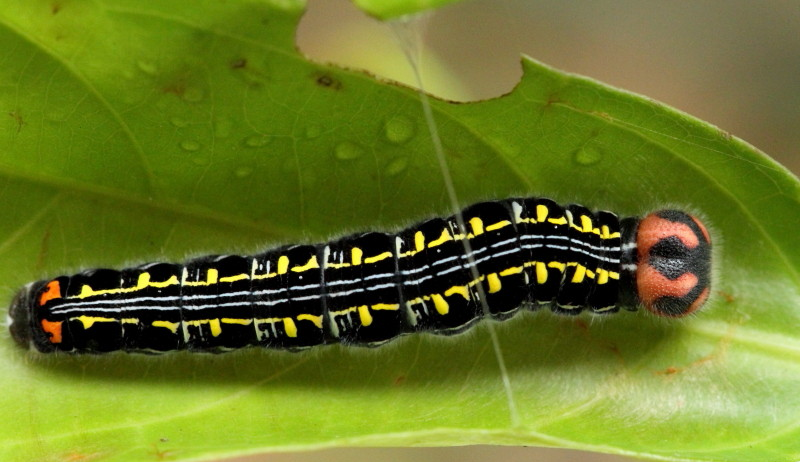
Larva

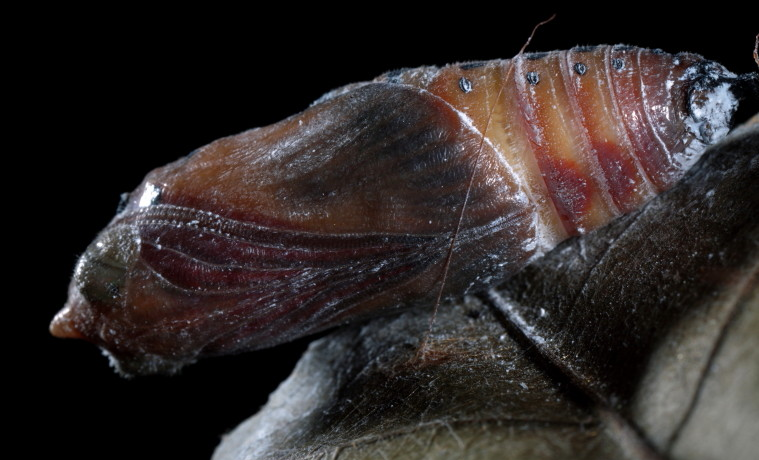
Chrysalis

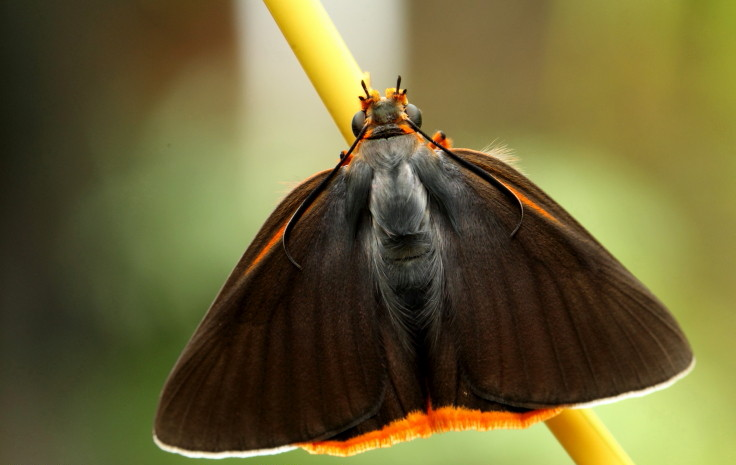
Imago (dorsal view)

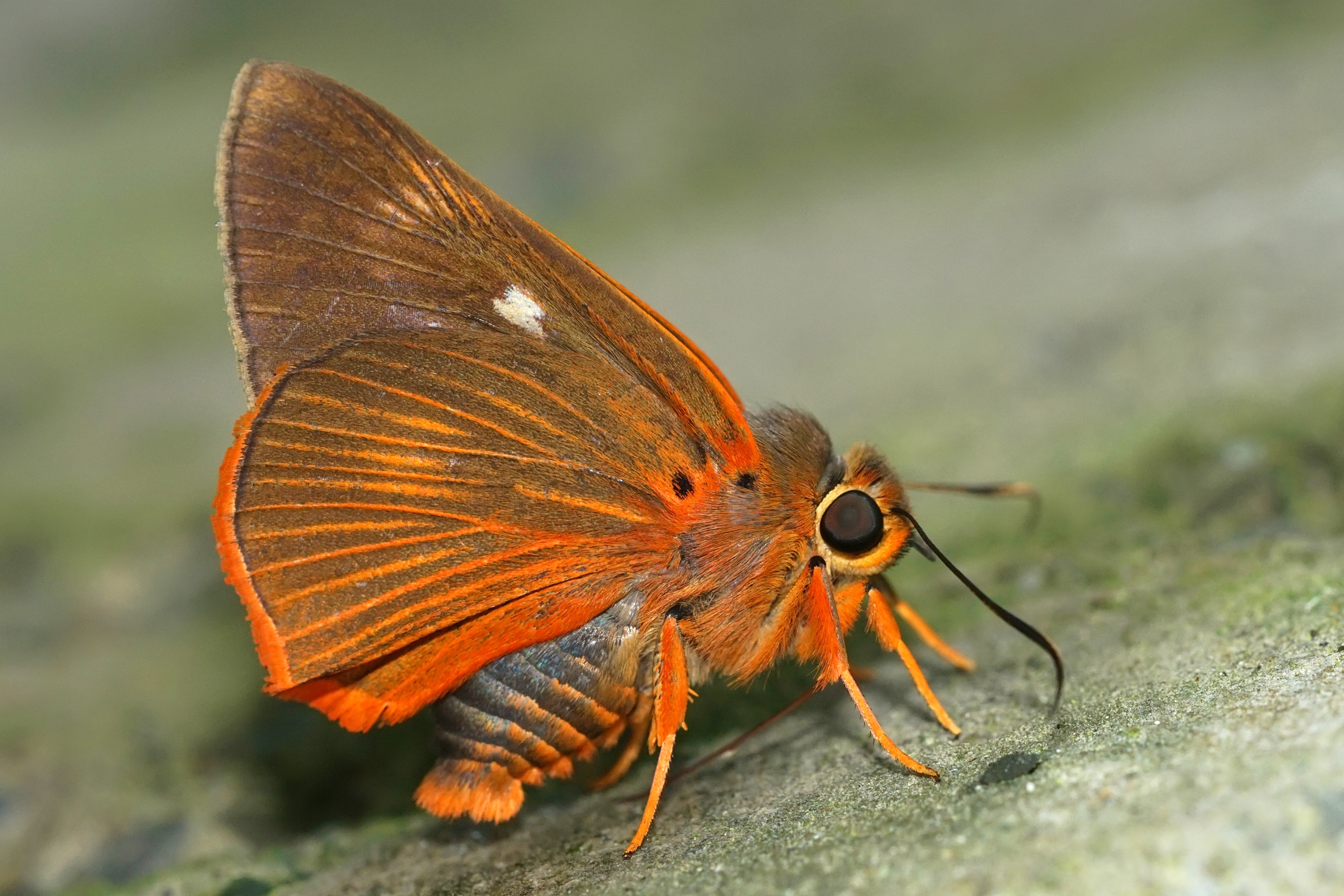
Imago (lateral view)

== Habits ==
The orange-striped awl is an insect of the low foothills with dense jungles and heavy rainfall. It is rarely seen out of such terrain. Crepuscular in nature, it flies early in the mornings or late in the evenings. It has strong, fast and straight flight. It is best seen in ravines and nullahs. It hovers at leaves and visits Lantana and other attractive flowers.

== Life history ==
The larva of Burara jaina fergusonii de Nicéville, 1893 has been recorded on Hiptage benghalensis (Malpighiaceae) and Combretum latifolium (Combretaceae).
