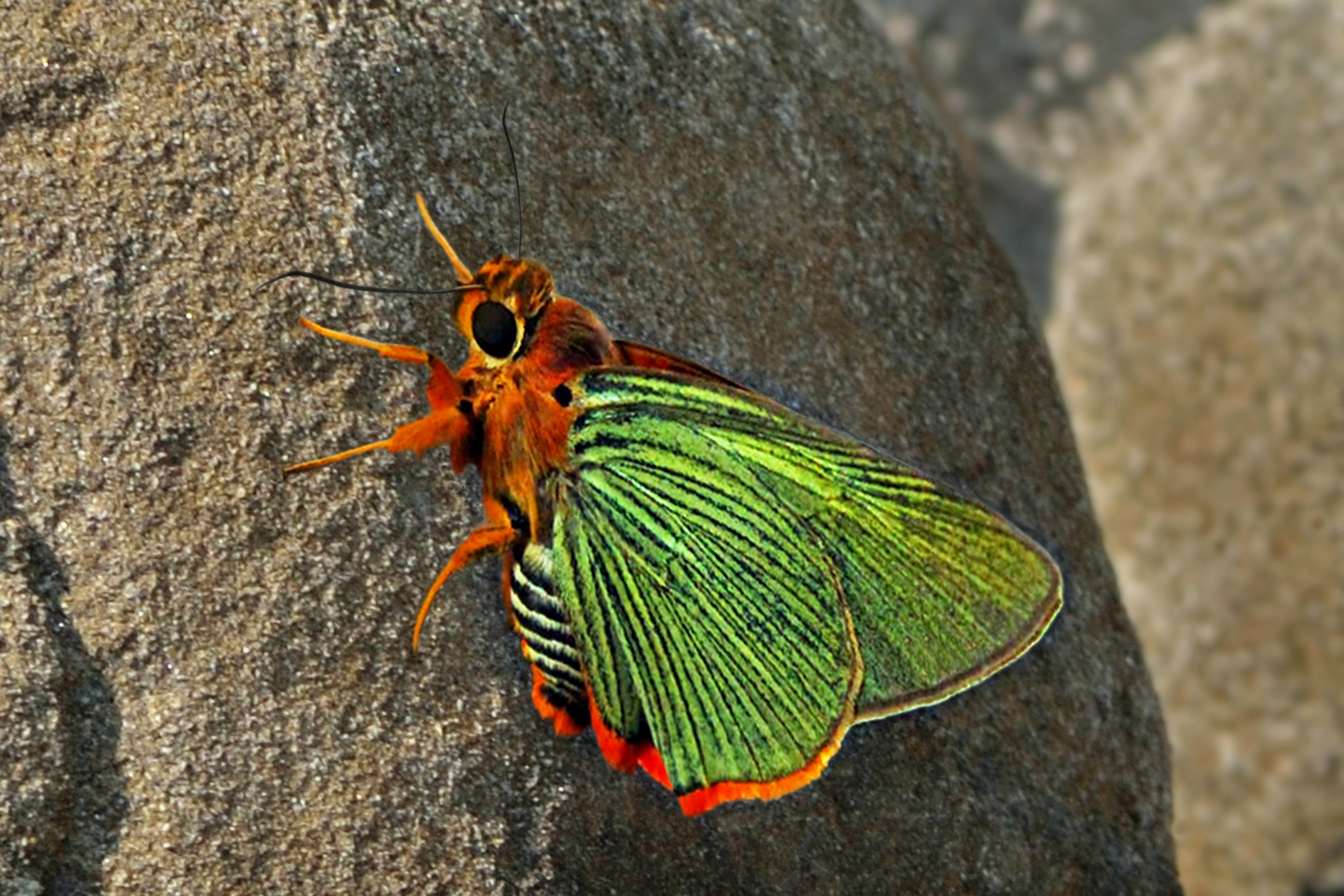

Scientific classification
- Kingdom: Animalia
- Phylum: Arthropoda
- Clade: Pancrustacea
- Class: Insecta
- Order: Lepidoptera
- Family: Hesperiidae
- Genus: Burara
- Species: B. vasutana

Binomial name
- Burara vasutana (Moore, 1866)

Synonyms
- Ismene vasutana Moore, 1866; Bibasis vasutana (Moore, 1866)

= Burara vasutana =

Green awlet

Species of butterfly

Burara vasutana, the green awlet, is a species of hesperid butterfly found in Asia. The butterfly was reassigned to genus Burara by Vane-Wright and de Jong (2003) and is considered by them to be Burara vasutana.

== Range ==
The green awlet is found in Nepal, the Indian Himalayas, Myanmar, Thailand and Laos.

In India, the butterfly ranges from Kumaon, across Nepal along the Himalayas to Sikkim and Assam and eastwards towards Myanmar. The type locality is Darjeeling in northern West Bengal.

== Status ==
William Harry Evans described it is being not rare in the Himalayas.

== Description ==
The butterfly has a wingspan of 55 to 65 mm.

Edward Yerbury Watson (1891) gives a detailed description:

Male. Upperside deep purple brown, paler on the base of the wings; forewing with orange yellow costal basal streak. Cilia of hindwing broad and bright orange yellow. Underside glossy greyish green, the veins and narrow intermediate parallel lines blackish; a patch on posterior half of forewing brown bordered above with blue. Third joint of palpi brown, the rest orange yellow. Head, thorax in front and beneath, legs, middle of abdomen beneath, and anal tuft bright orange yellow.

Female. Upperside darker brown, the base of the wings greyish blue; forewing with two small semitransparent spots obliquely beneath the extremity.

== Habits ==
This butterfly is crepuscular.
