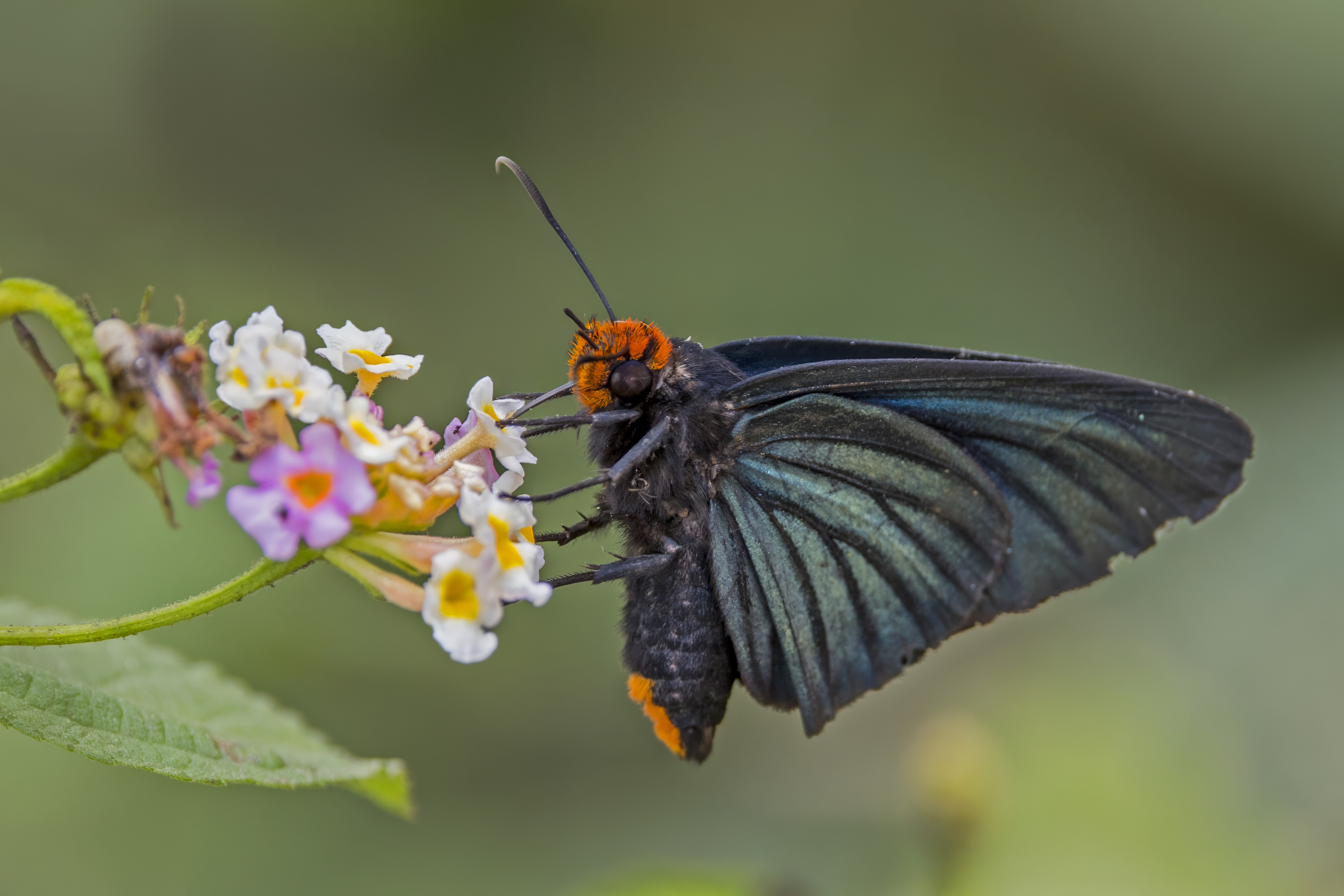
- male in Ghana

Scientific classification
- Kingdom: Animalia
- Phylum: Arthropoda
- Clade: Pancrustacea
- Class: Insecta
- Order: Lepidoptera
- Family: Hesperiidae
- Subfamily: Coeliadinae
- Genus: Pyrrhochalcia; Mabille, 1904
- Species: P. iphis

Binomial name
- Pyrrhochalcia iphis (Drury, 1773)

Synonyms
- Papilio iphis Drury, 1773; Papilio phidias Cramer, 1779; Papilio jupiter Fabricius, 1787

= Pyrrhochalcia =

Genus of butterflies

Pyrrhochalcia is a genus of butterflies in the family Hesperiidae. It contains only one species, Pyrrhochalcia iphis, the African giant skipper, which is found in Guinea, Sierra Leone, Liberia, Ivory Coast, Ghana, Togo, Nigeria, Cameroon, Gabon, the Republic of the Congo and Angola. It was first described by Dru Drury in 1773.

The habitat consists of forests, including dry coastal forests. Adults of both sexes are attracted to flowers, including coral creeper. Males are also attracted to bird droppings and are known to mud-puddle.

The larvae feed on Psychotria calva, Acridocarpus smeathmanni, Dissotis, Anacardia and Ancistrophyllum species.

== Description ==
Upper side: Antennae thickest in the middle. Head scarlet. Thorax and abdomen black. All the wings green brassy coloured, the nerves black, those parts that surround the body being of a raven black. The tips of the anterior wings orange coloured.

Under side: Palpi scarlet and hairy, the extremities being small and black. Breast, legs, sides, and abdomen black. Anus scarlet. Wings of a yellower brassy hue than on the upper side. Superior wings tipped with orange, but next the body greenish black; the same colour occupying the external edges of the posterior wings.

Wingspan 4 inches (100 mm).

Torben Larsen developed a species numbering system for his 2005 publication Butterflies of West Africa. This species is #1211. The 'Larsen' numbers have since been used with permission in A Sharp Eye on Butterflies of Ghana.
