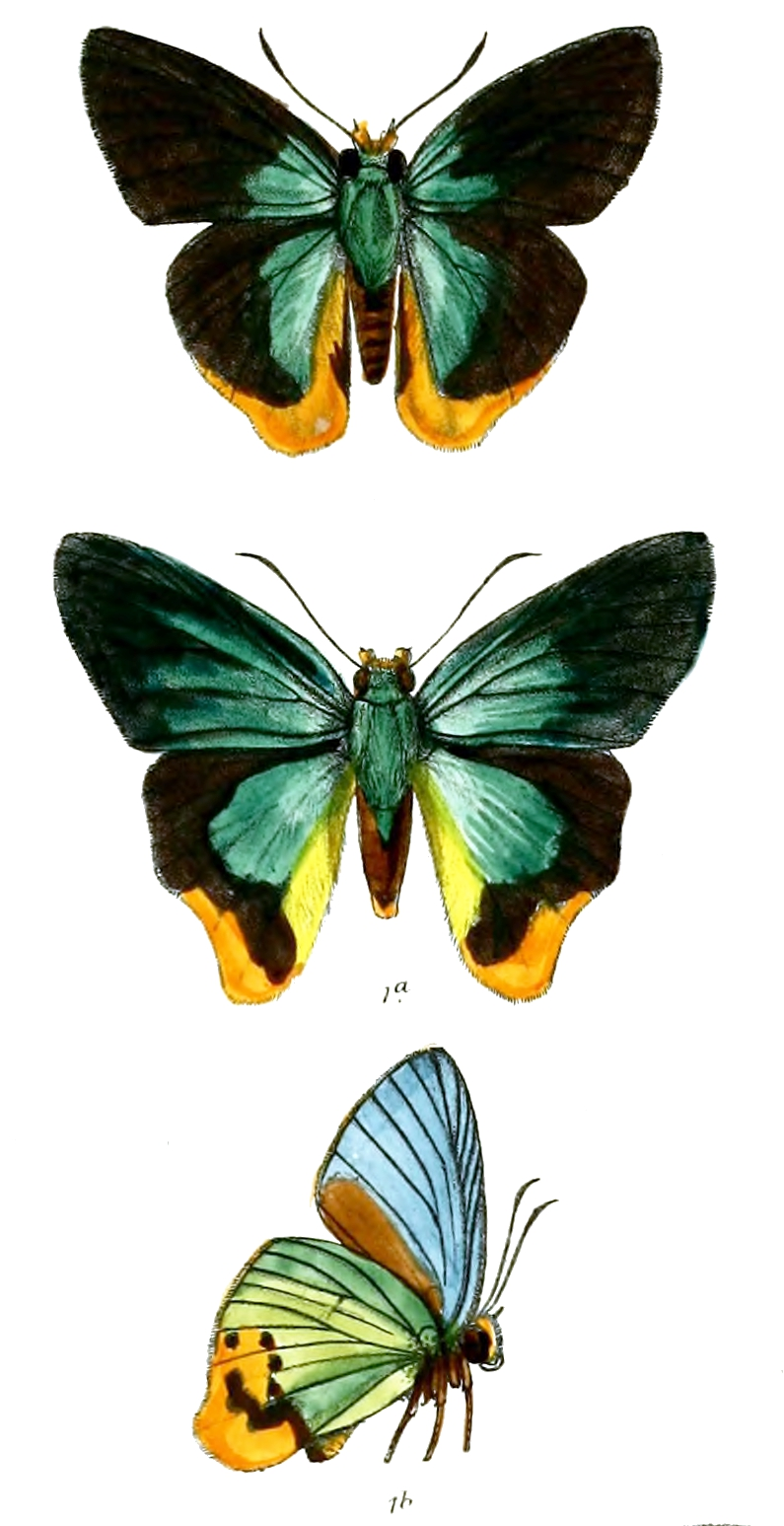
- Choaspes subcaudata

Scientific classification
- Kingdom: Animalia
- Phylum: Arthropoda
- Class: Insecta
- Order: Lepidoptera
- Family: Hesperiidae
- Subfamily: Coeliadinae
- Genus: Choaspes; Moore, [1881]

= Choaspes (butterfly) =

Genus of butterflies

Choaspes is an Indomalayan realm and Australasian realm genus of skippers in the family Hesperiidae. They are the only skippers with strongly hairy eyes.

== Species ==
- Choaspes adhara Fruhstorfer, 1911
- Choaspes benjaminii (Guérin-Méneville, 1843)
- Choaspes estrella de Jong, 1980 Philippines
- Choaspes hemixanthus Rothschild & Jordan, 1903 Sulawesi, Halamahera, New Guinea
- Choaspes illuensis (Ribbe, 1900) New Guinea
- Choaspes plateni (Staudinger, 1888)
- Choaspes stigmata Evans, 1932
- Choaspes subcaudata (C. & R. Felder, [1867])
- Choaspes xanthopogon (Kollar, [1844])

== Etymology ==
Presumably from Greek choaspes (Χοάσπης [=Khoáspēs]), masculine proper noun, from the river Karkheh or Karkhen in Khūzestān Province Andimeshk city, Iran (ancient Susiana). It is mentioned as Choaspes by Pliny.
