= Pyrrhiades =

- male Pyrrhiades lucagus, Ghana

Scientific classification
- Kingdom: Animalia
- Phylum: Arthropoda
- Clade: Pancrustacea
- Class: Insecta
- Order: Lepidoptera
- Family: Hesperiidae
- Subfamily: Coeliadinae
- Genus: Pyrrhiades; Lindsey & Miller, 1965
- Species: P. lucagus

Binomial name
- Pyrrhiades lucagus (Cramer, [1777])

Synonyms
- Papilio lucagus Cramer, 1777; Ismene juno Plötz, 1879

Genus of butterflies

Pyrrhiades is a genus of butterflies in the family Hesperiidae. It contains only one species, Pyrrhiades lucagus, the western blue policeman, which is found in Liberia, Ivory Coast and Ghana. The habitat consists of coastal forests.

Adults are attracted to flowers, bird droppings and mud patches.

The larvae feed on Acridocarpus smeathmanni.

Torben Larsen developed a species numbering system for his 2005 publication Butterflies of West Africa. This species is #1210. The 'Larsen' numbers have since been used with permission in A Sharp Eye on Butterflies of Ghana.
