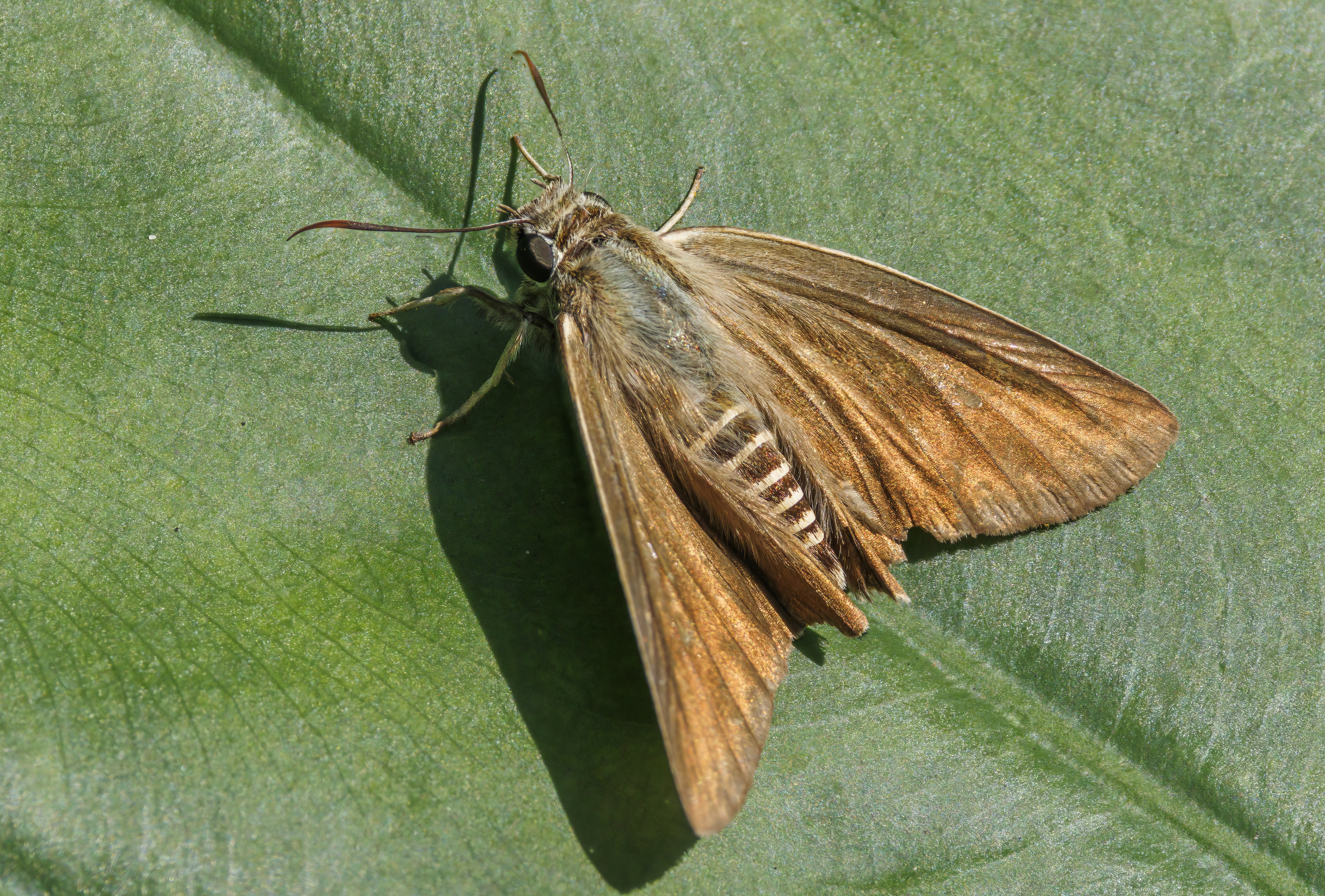

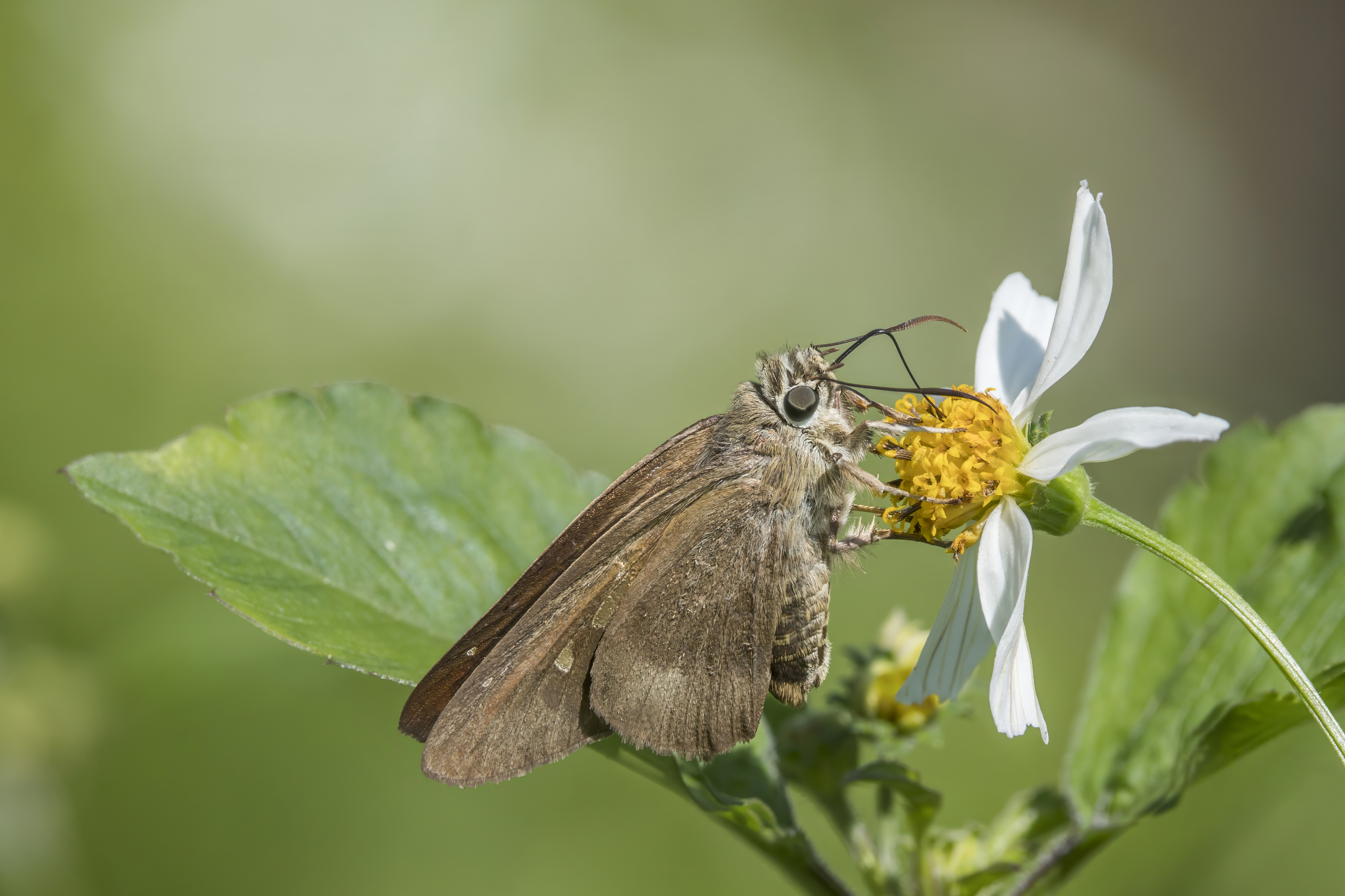
- both in Taiwan

Scientific classification
- Kingdom: Animalia
- Phylum: Arthropoda
- Class: Insecta
- Order: Lepidoptera
- Family: Hesperiidae
- Subfamily: Coeliadinae
- Genus: Badamia; Moore, 1881

Species
- See text

= Badamia =

Genus of butterflies

Badamia is an Indoaustralian genus of skipper butterflies containing two species. The larvae feed on Terminalia (Combretaceae).

== Species ==
The genus includes the following species:

- Badamia atrox (Butler, 1877) (Fiji)
- Badamia exclamationis (Fabricius, 1775)
