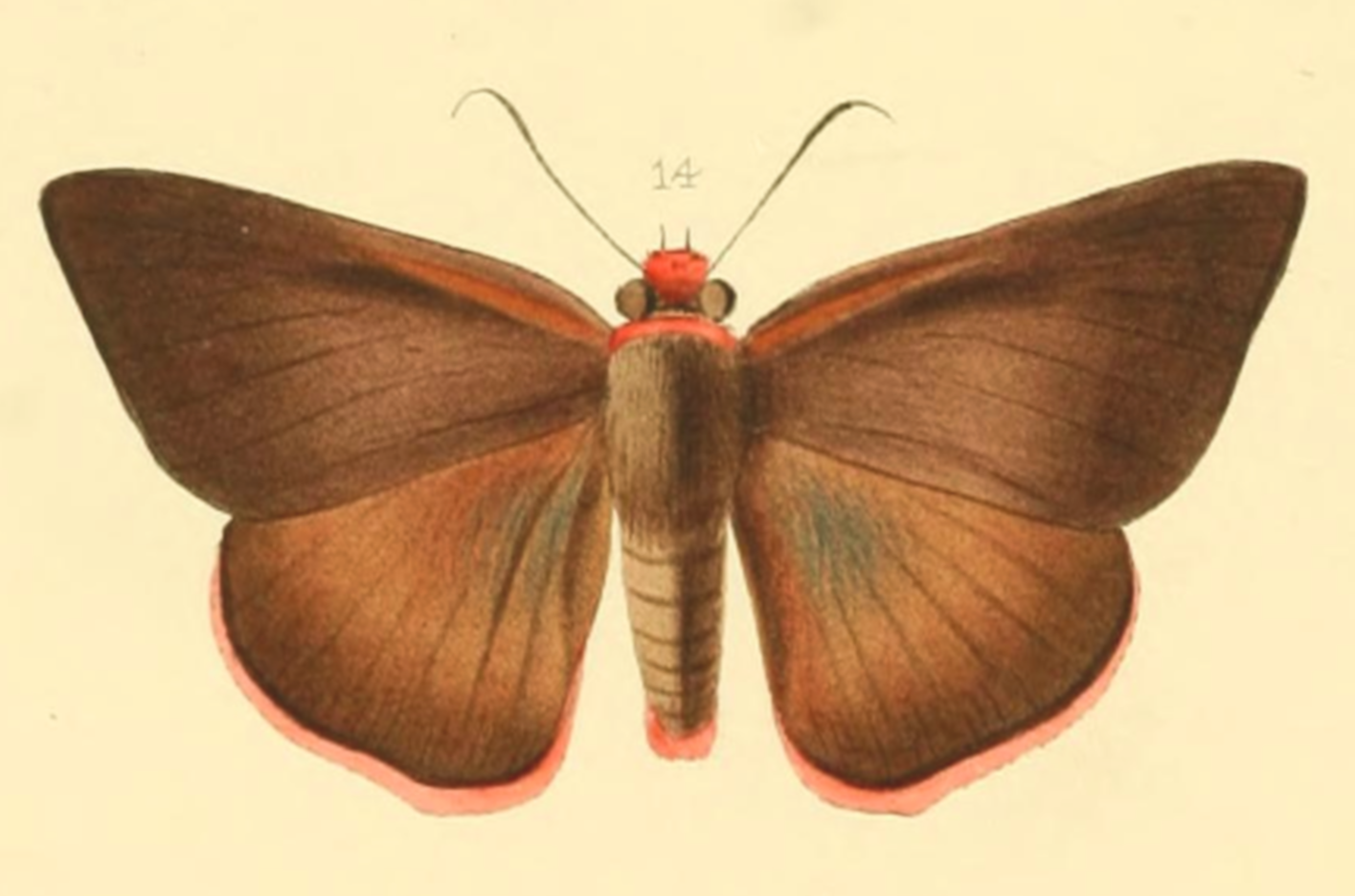

Scientific classification
- Domain: Eukaryota
- Kingdom: Animalia
- Phylum: Arthropoda
- Class: Insecta
- Order: Lepidoptera
- Family: Hesperiidae
- Genus: Burara
- Species: B. etelka

Binomial name
- Burara etelka (Hewitson, 1871)

Synonyms
- Ismene etelka Hewitson, 1871; Bibasis etelka (Hewitson, 1871)

= Burara etelka =

Species of butterfly

Burara etelka, the great orange awlet, is a species of skipper described by William Chapman Hewitson in 1871. In some schemes it is treated as Bibasis etelka. However, it was instead listed as Burara etelka in Maruyama & Otsuka, 1991, then again by Bridges, 1994. The genus Burara was further treated as valid by Vane-Wright & de Jong 2003 when they distinguished multiple species as divergent from Bibasis. Later, Chiba, 2009 detailed the comparative morphology of the species as Burara etelka, and the status as Burura was strongly supported in genomic analyses by Toussaint, 2020.

== Distribution ==
The distribution of Burara etelka is mostly Southeast Asia.
