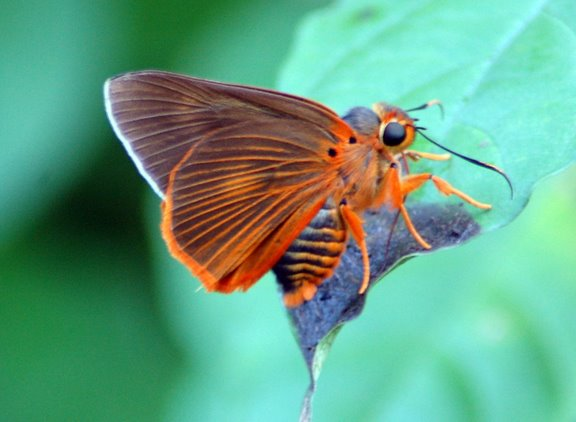
- Orange-striped awl Burara jaina

Scientific classification
- Kingdom: Animalia
- Phylum: Arthropoda
- Class: Insecta
- Order: Lepidoptera
- Family: Hesperiidae
- Subfamily: Coeliadinae
- Genus: Burara; Swinhoe, 1893

= Burara =

Genus of butterflies

Burara is a genus of skipper butterflies. Its species were previously considered part of Bibasis. They were treated Burara by Vane-Wright and de Jong in 2003. Its species are crepuscular.

== Species ==
Burara contains fourteen species, according to Hideyuki Chiba's 2009 revision of subfamily Coeliadinae.

- Burara amara (Moore, 1866)
- Burara anadi (De Nicéville, 1884)
- Burara aquilina (Speyer, 1879)
- Burara etelka (Hewitson, 1867)
- Burara gomata (Moore, 1866)
- Burara harisa (Moore, 1866)
- Burara jaina (Moore, 1866)
- Burara miracula Evans, 1949
- Burara nishiyamai Chiba & Tsukiyama, 2009
- Burara oedipodea (Swainson, 1820)
- Burara phul (Mabille, 1876)
- Burara striata (Hewitson, 1867)
- Burara tuckeri (Elwes & Edwards, 1897)
- Burara vasutana (Moore, 1866)
