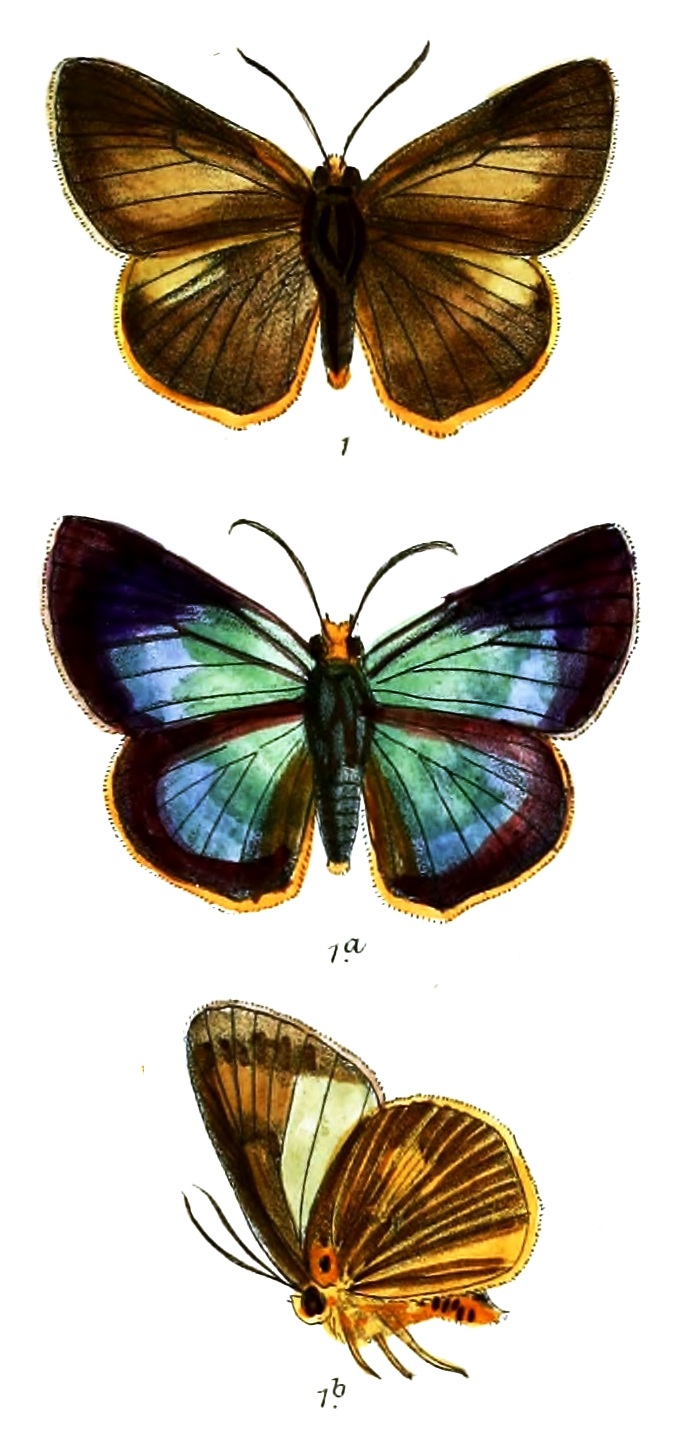
- Male (top), female and male underwing

Scientific classification
- Kingdom: Animalia
- Phylum: Arthropoda
- Clade: Pancrustacea
- Class: Insecta
- Order: Lepidoptera
- Family: Hesperiidae
- Genus: Burara
- Species: B. harisa

Binomial name
- Burara harisa (de Niceville, 1883)

Synonyms
- Ismene harisa de Niceville, 1883; Burara harisa Vane-Wright & de Jong, 2003; Bibasis harisade Niceville, 1883

= Burara harisa =

Orange awlet

Species of butterfly

Burara harisa, the orange awlet, is a species of hesperid found in Asia. The butterfly was reassigned to genus Burara by Vane-Wright and de Jong (2003) and is considered by them to be Burara harisa.

== Range ==
The orange awlet is found in India, Myanmar, Malaysia, Java, Singapore, Hong Kong and north Vietnam.

In India, the butterfly is found along the Himalayas from Sikkim to Assam and eastwards to south Myanmar. It also has been recorded from the Andaman Islands.

The type locality is Bengal.

== Status ==
It is considered by William Harry Evans to be very rare in Hong Kong, rare in South India, but not rare in the Himalayas.

== Description ==
The butterfly has a wingspan of 45 to 55 mm.

Edward Yerbury Watson (1891) gives a detailed description:

Male and female brown.

Male. Upperside dull vinaceous brown, palest on the disk; forewing with an orange yellow costal streak; hindwing broadly along anterior margin pale buff yellow. Body greyish. Cilia of hindwing orange yellow. Underside paler suffused with orange yellow; forewing with a curved series of pale purple narrow streaks between the veins before the apex, and a broad pale buff patch along the posterior margin; hindwing with the veins and lines between them and cilia orange yellow: a black orange yellow encircled basal spot on both wings; a discal series of pale purplish streaks. Third joint of palpi brown; palpi beneath, front and sides of thorax, legs and streak alongside of abdomen orange yellow; middle of thorax and abdomen and anal tuft orange yellow.

Female. Upperside dark purple brown; the base of wings greyish, with steel blue gloss. Body greyish. Cilia of hindwing pale orange yellow. Underside as in male; posterior margin of forewing with a less defined pale patch.

— Watson

== Habits ==
This butterfly is crepuscular.

== Host plants ==
The larva has been recorded on Zingiber zerumbet (Zingiberaceae).
