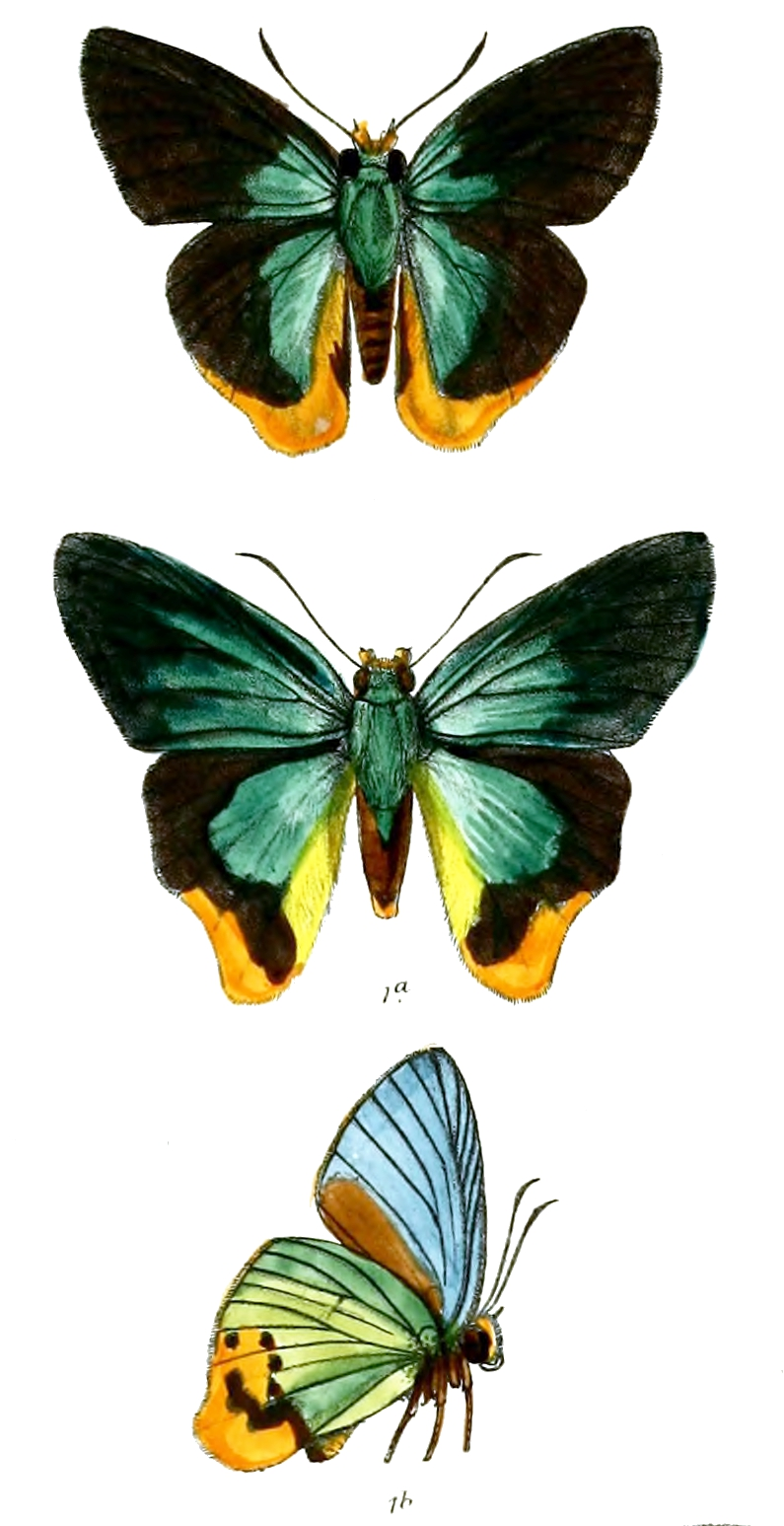
- From top: male, female and male underside

Scientific classification
- Kingdom: Animalia
- Phylum: Arthropoda
- Clade: Pancrustacea
- Class: Insecta
- Order: Lepidoptera
- Family: Hesperiidae
- Genus: Choaspes
- Species: C. subcaudata

Binomial name
- Choaspes subcaudata (Felder & Felder, 1867)

Synonyms
- Ismene subcaudata C. & R. Felder, [1867]; Ismene crawfurdi Distant, 1882

= Choaspes subcaudata =

Species of butterfly

Choaspes subcaudata, commonly known as the blue awlking, is a species of butterfly belonging to the family Hesperiidae. It is found in Asia, Malaysia and Borneo. The species was first described by Baron Cajetan von Felder and Rudolf Felder in 1867.

== Subspecies ==
- Choaspes subcaudata subcaudata
- Choaspes subcaudata crawfurdi (Distant, 1882) (southern Burma, Thailand, Laos, Peninsular Malaysia, Singapore, Borneo, Sumatra, Nias)
