= William Frederick Evans =

English entomologist and civil servant

William Frederick Evans (18 September 1813 – 17 October 1867) was an English entomologist and civil servant who worked on Odonata and Orthoptera. He resided at the Admiralty House in Whitehall.

Evans wrote British Libellulinae or Dragonflies (1845) which has 12 coloured plates. This seems to be a rare work of entomology. He also described a species of grasshopper from New South Wales.

In 1848, he was Secretary of the Entomological Society of London. Between 1845 and 1847 he gave four gifts of Coleoptera to the British Museum (Natural History) (1845.132; 1846.113; 1847.45; 1847.85). Other insects were given at different times from various countries including North Africa and in 1870 and 1875 he sold a collection of British and foreign insects, and his library through James Francis Stephens.

Evans was born in Lambeth, Surrey, to James Evans, a clerk in the Admiralty, and Sarah Evans. He died in Kensington, aged 64.

Taxa described by Evans include:

- Brachytron (1845)
- Ephippithyta maculata (1847)
