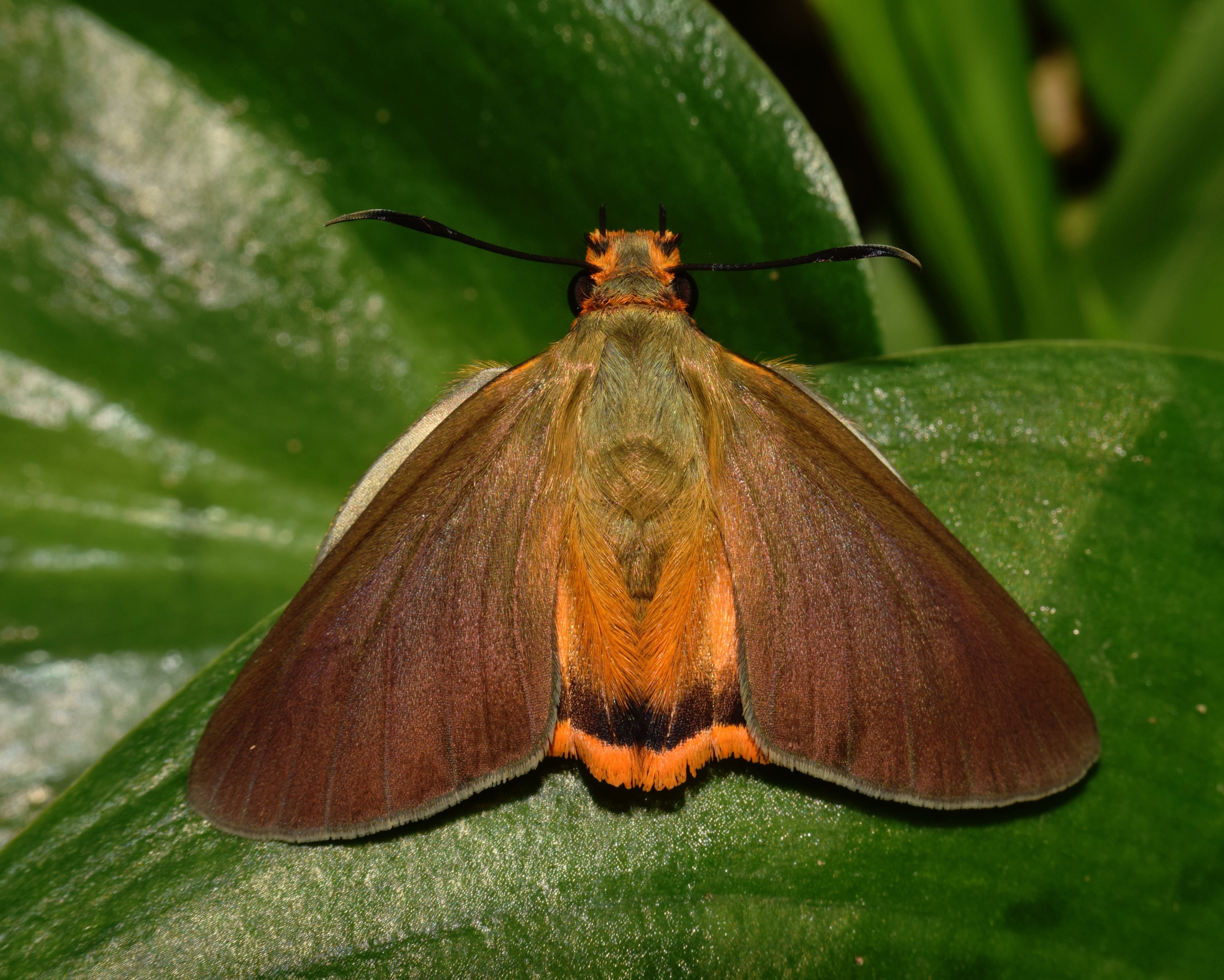
- Coeliades keithloa

Scientific classification
- Kingdom: Animalia
- Phylum: Arthropoda
- Clade: Pancrustacea
- Class: Insecta
- Order: Lepidoptera
- Family: Hesperiidae
- Subfamily: Coeliadinae; Evans, [1937]

Diversity
- About 8 genera

Synonyms
- Rhopalocamptinae Evans, [1937]

= Coeliadinae =

Subfamily of butterflies

Coeliadinae is a subfamily of the skipper butterfly family (Hesperiidae). With about 150 described species, this is one of several smallish skipper butterfly subfamilies. It was first proposed by William Frederick Evans in 1937.

The subfamily is restricted to the Old World tropics. It is the sister group to all other living lineages of skippers. In Coeliadinae the second segment of the palpi is erect and densely scaled, and the third segment is perpendicular to it, long, slender and without scales.

== Genera ==
This subfamily was revised in 2009 by Hideyuki Chiba. According to his revision, the subfamily includes nine genera.

- Allora Waterhouse & Lyell, 1914 – 2 spp.
- Badamia Moore, 1881 – 2 spp.
- Bibasis Moore, 1881 – awlets; 5 spp.
- Burara Swinhoe, 1893 – 14 spp.
- Choaspes Moore, 1881 – 9 spp.
- Coeliades Hübner, 1818 – policemen; 21 spp.
- Hasora Moore, 1881 – awls; around 30 spp.
- Tekliades Grishin, 2019 – 1 sp.

Former genera:

- Pyrrhiades Mabille, 1904
- Pyrrhochalcia Lindsey & Miller, 1965
