= Edward Yerbury Watson =

English entomologist (1864–1897)

Edward Yerbury Watson (27 July 1864 – 8 November 1897) was an English entomologist who specialised in Lepidoptera most notably Hesperiidae.

Yerbury Watson was born in British India to Joanna and George Edward Watson. He joined the North Lancashire regiment as Lieutenant in 1884 later joining the Madras Staff Corps (6 Feb 1884) and rising to become Deputy Assistant Commissary General on the Indian Staff Corps. He died from a shot fired during the Tirah Campaign.

He was a Member of the Bombay Natural History Society, a Fellow of the Zoological Society of London and from 1891 of the Entomological Society of London. His India collections are conserved by the Natural History Museum, London.

== Works ==
- E. Y., Watson (1891). Hesperiidae Indicae : being a reprint of descriptions of the Hesperiidae of India, Burma, and Ceylon. Madras: Vest and Company.
- A proposed classification of the Hesperiidae, with a revision of the genera. (1893). Proceedings of the Zoological Society of London 1893: pages 3–132
- A key to the Asiatic genera of the Hesperiidae. (1895). The Journal of the Bombay Natural History Society. 9(4): pages: 411–437
