= List of butterflies of the Andaman and Nicobar Islands =

This article lists the butterfly species of the Andaman and Nicobar Islands. 219 species are found on the islands. This article uses British English throughout.

== Swallowtails (Family: Papilionidae) ==
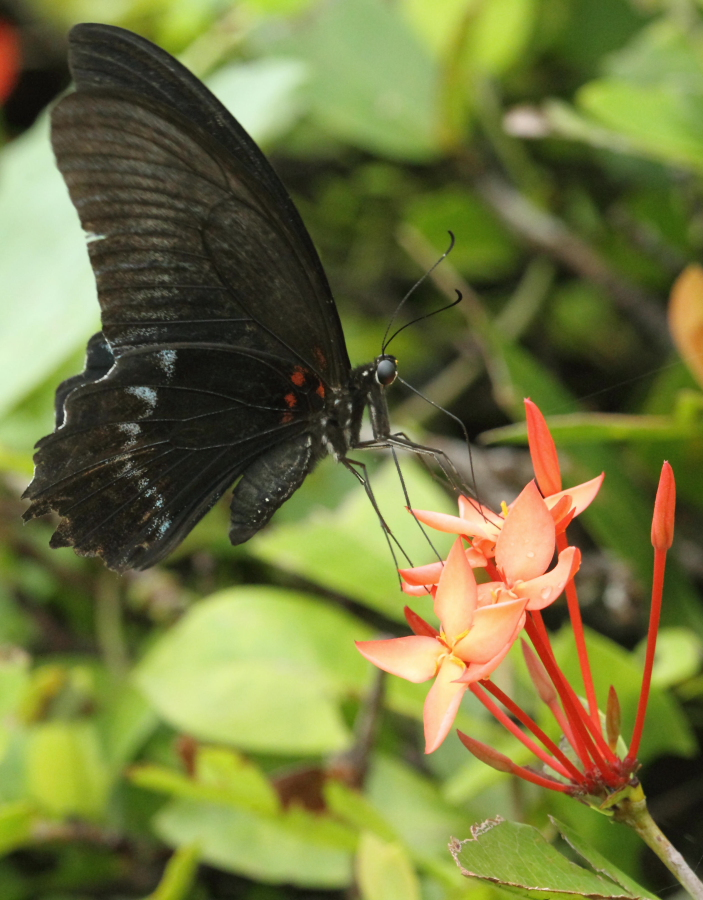
Andaman mormon

Fourteen species of swallowtails are found on the islands.

- Common clubtail (Losaria coon)
- Andaman clubtail (Losaria rhodifer)
- Common rose (Pachliopta aristolochiae)
- Crimson rose (Pachliopta hector)
- Common birdwing (Troides helena)
- Common mime (Papilio clytia)
- Andaman mormon (Papilio mayo)
- Common mormon (Papilio polytes)
- Lime butterfly (Papilio demoleus)
- Great mormon (Papilio memnon)
- Andaman helen (Papilio prexaspes)
- Andaman swordtail (Graphium epaminondas)
- Tailed jay (Graphium agamemnon)
- Great jay (Graphium eurypylus)

== Skippers (Family: Hesperiidae) ==
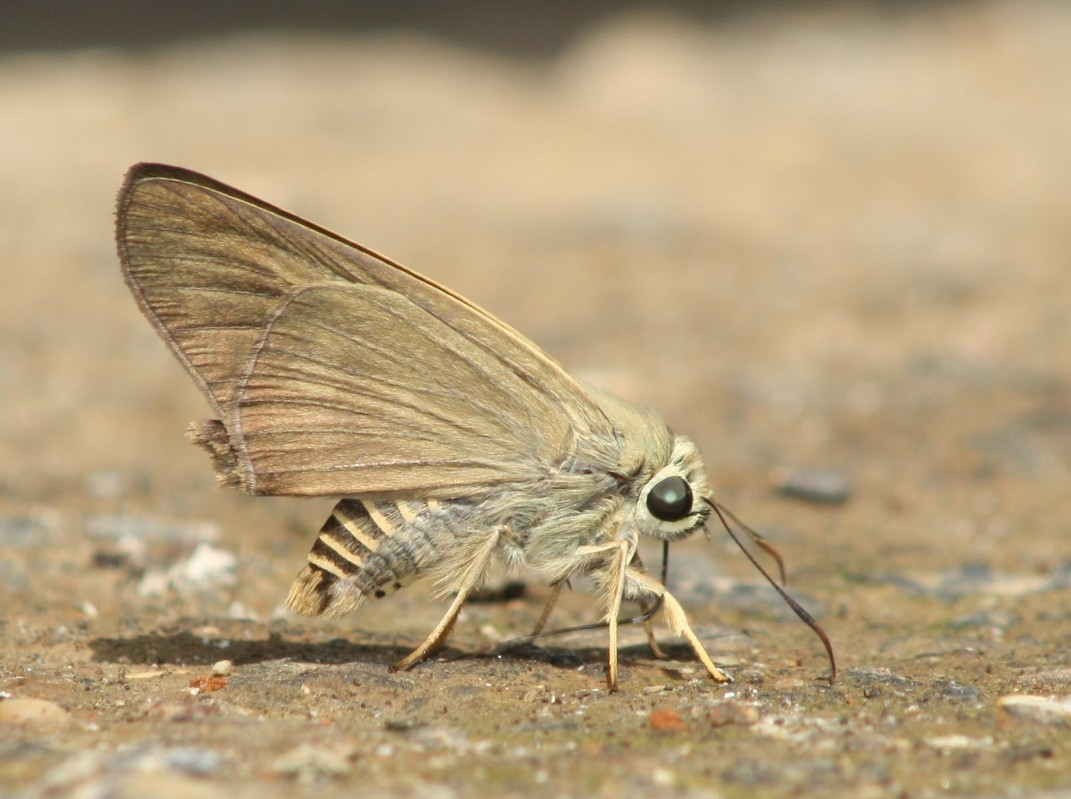
Brown awl

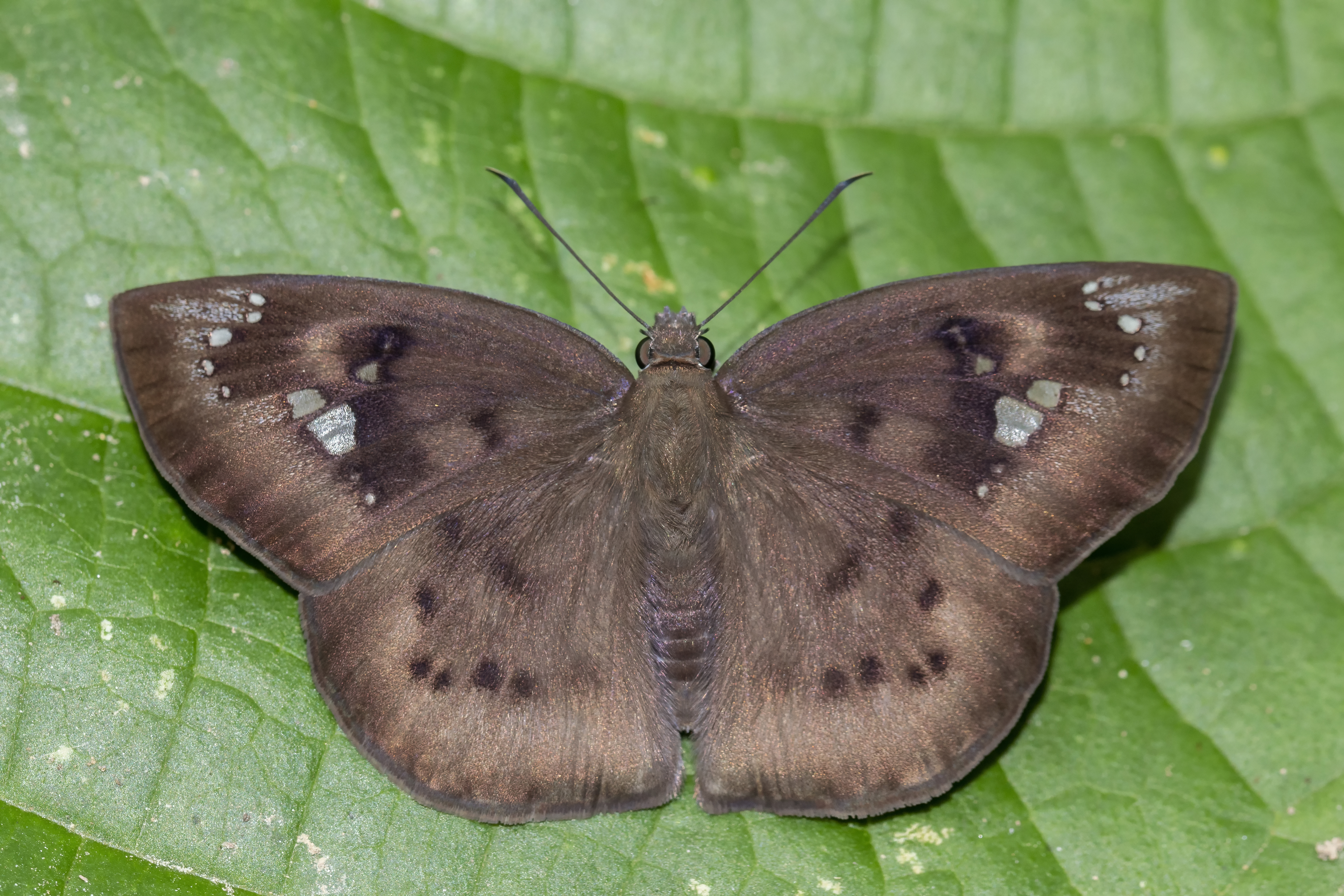
Pied flat

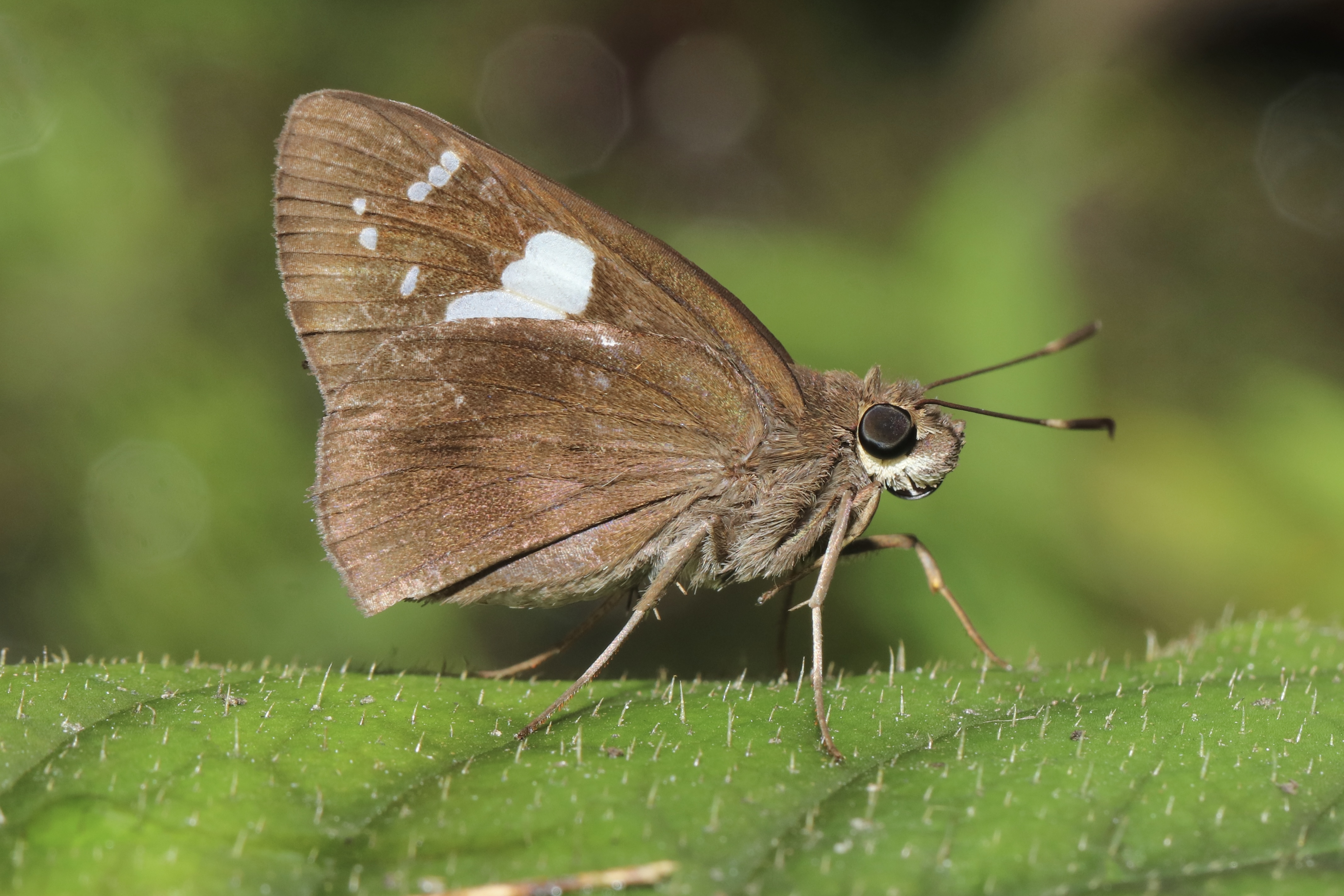
Restricted demon

Forty-two species of skippers are found on the islands.

- Brown awl (Badamia exclamationis)
- Orange-tailed awlet (Bibasis sena)
- Small green awlet (Burara amara)
- Orange-striped awlet (Burara harisa)
- Orange awlet (Burara jaina)
- Common awl (Hasora badra)
- Common banded awl (Hasora chromus)
- Violet awl (Hasora leucospila)
- White banded awl (Hasora taminatus)
- Plain banded awl (Hasora vitta)
- Common yellow-breasted flat (Gerosis bhagava)
- Large snow flat (Tagiades gana)
- Pied flat (Tagiades japetus)
- Water snow flat (Tagiades litigiosa)
- Andaman yellow-banded flat (Celaenorrhinus andamanicus)
- Dark yellow-banded flat (Celaenorrhinus aurivittatus)
- Common spotted flat (Celaenorrhinus leucocera)
- Common small flat (Sarangesa dasahara)
- Moore's ace (Halpe porus)
- Forest hopper (Astictopterus jama)
- Restricted demon (Notocrypta curvifascia)
- Common banded demon (Notocrypta paralysos)
- Small palm bob (Suastus minutus)
- Tree flitter (Hyarotis adrastus)
- Banded redeye (Gangara lebadea)
- Giant redeye (Gangara thyrsis)
- Andaman redeye (Erionota hiraca)
- Dark-brand redeye (Matapa cresta)
- Grey-brand redeye (Matapa druna)
- Obscure-branded swift (Pelopidas agna)
- Conjoined swift (Pelopidas conjuncta)
- Variable swift (Pelopidas mathias)
- Contiguous swift (Polytremis lubricans)
- Paintbrush swift (Baoris farri)
- Colon swift (Caltoris cahira)
- Common dartlet (Oriens gola)
- Malay dartlet (Oriens paragola)
- Chinese dart (Potanthus confucius)
- Large dart (Potanthus serina)
- Broad bi-dent dart (Potanthus trachala)
- Common palm dart (Telicota colon)
- Plain palm dart (Cephrenes acalle)

== Whites (Family: Pieridae) ==
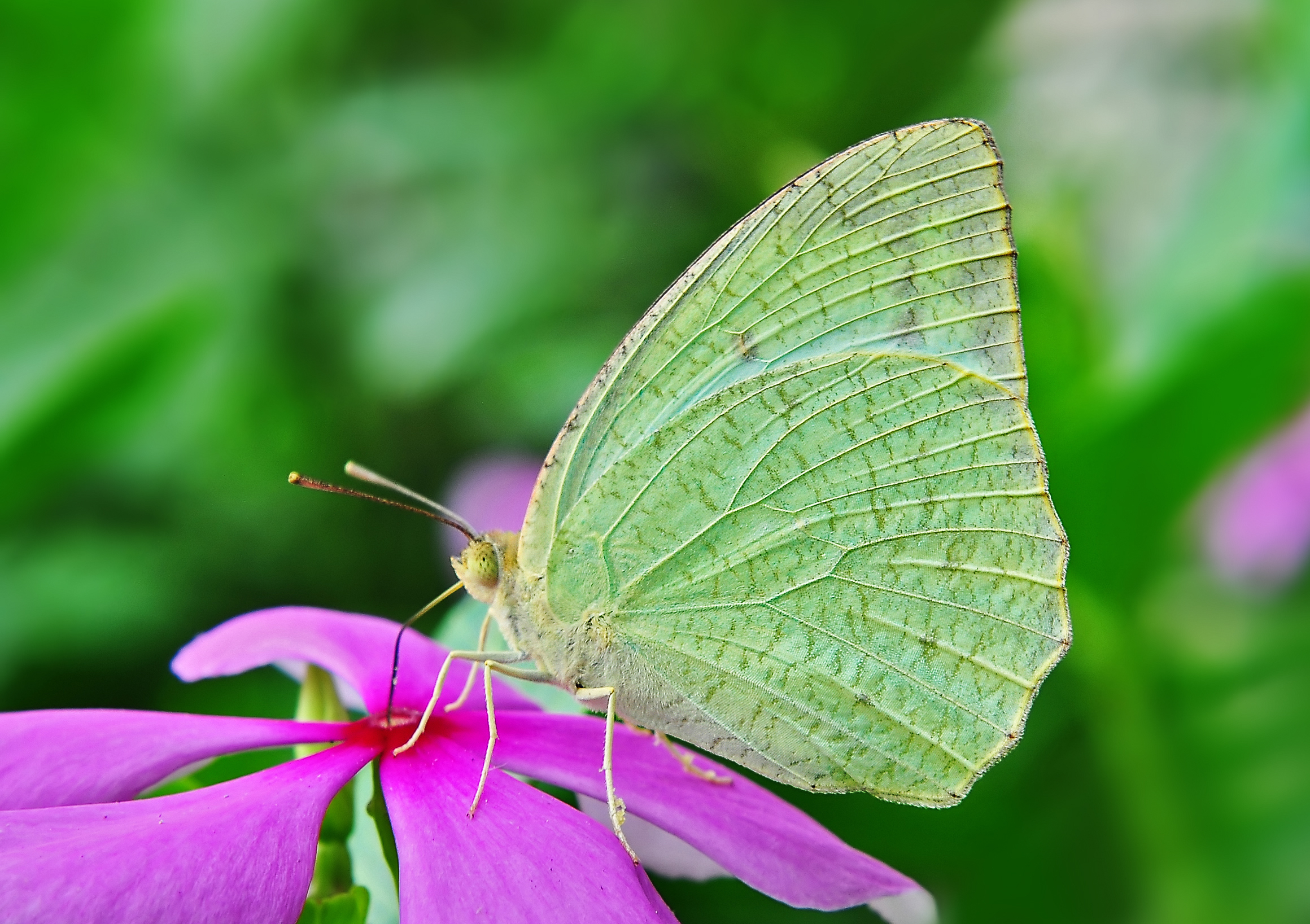
Mottled emigrant

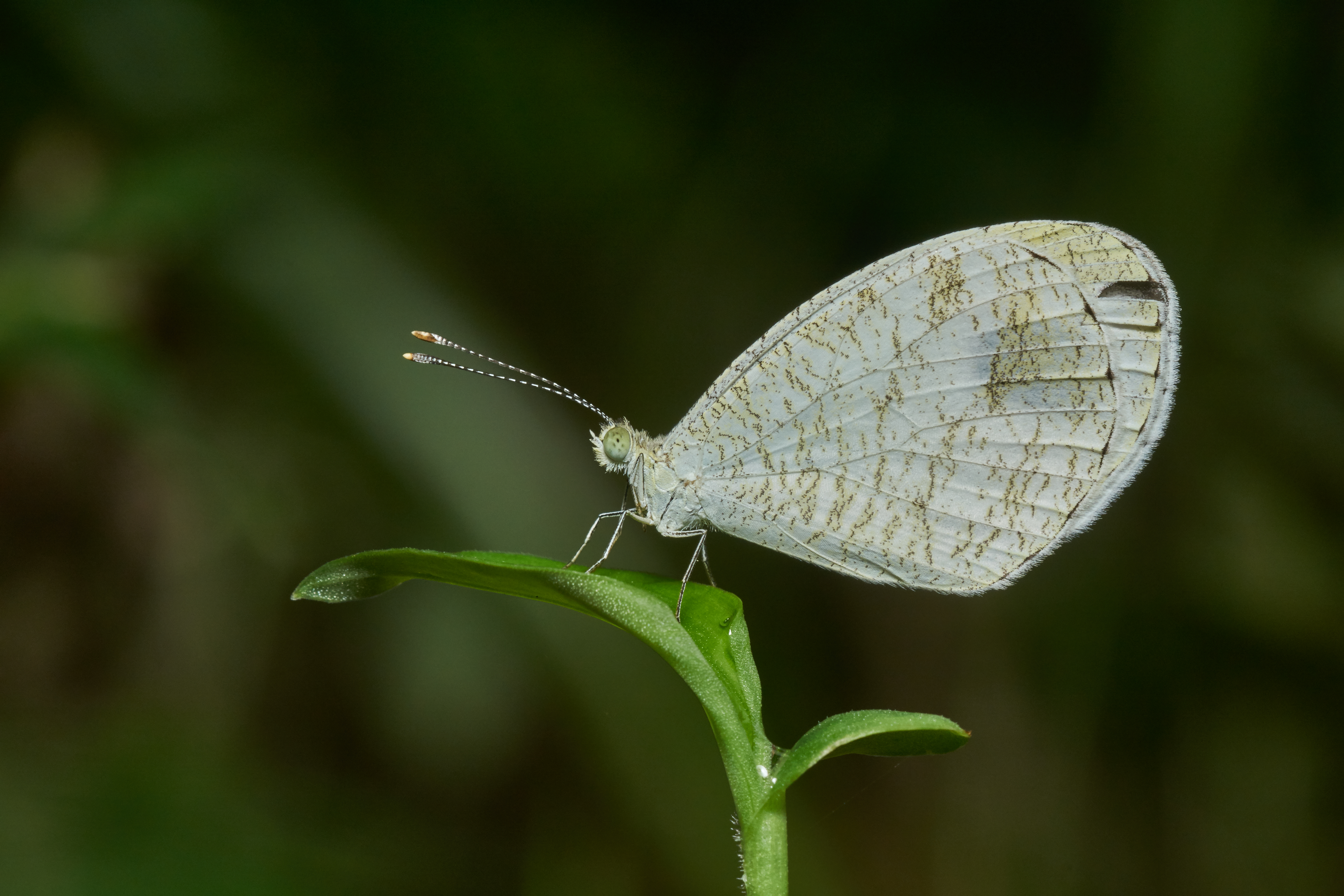
Pysche

Twenty-one species are found on the islands.

- Common emigrant (Catopsilia pomona)
- Mottled emigrant (Catopsilia pyranthe)
- Orange emigrant (Catopsilia scylla)
- Tree yellow (Gandaca harina)
- One-spot grass yellow (Eurema andersonii)
- Three-spotted grass yellow (Eurema blanda)
- Small grass yellow (Eurema brigitta)
- Common grass yellow (Eurema hecabe)
- Psyche (Leptosia nina)
- Yellow orange-tip (Ixias pyrene)
- Common albatross (Appias albina)
- Striped albatross (Appias libythea)
- Chocolate albatross (Appias lyncida)
- Lesser albatross (Appias paulina)
- Nicobar albatross (Appias panda)
- Lesser gull (Cepora nadina)
- Common gull (Cepora nerissa)
- Painted jezebel (Delias hyparete)
- Dark wanderer (Pareronia ceylanica)
- Indian wanderer (Pareronia hippia)
- Great orange-tip (Hebomoia glaucippe)

== Metalmarks (Family: Riodinidae) ==
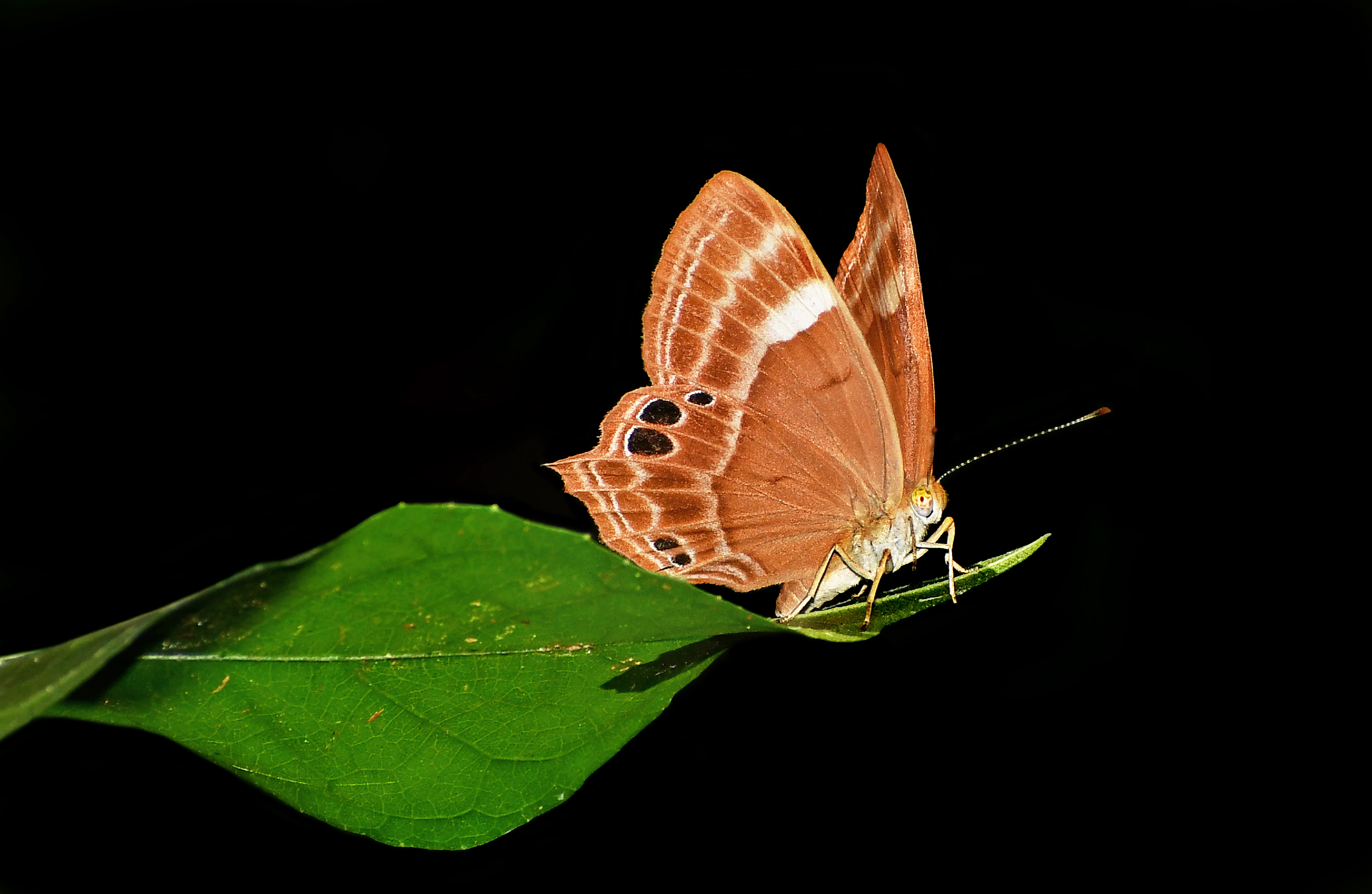
Two-spot plum judy

One species of metalmark is found on the islands.

- Two-spot plum judy (Abisara bifasciata)

== Blues (Family: Lycaenidae) ==
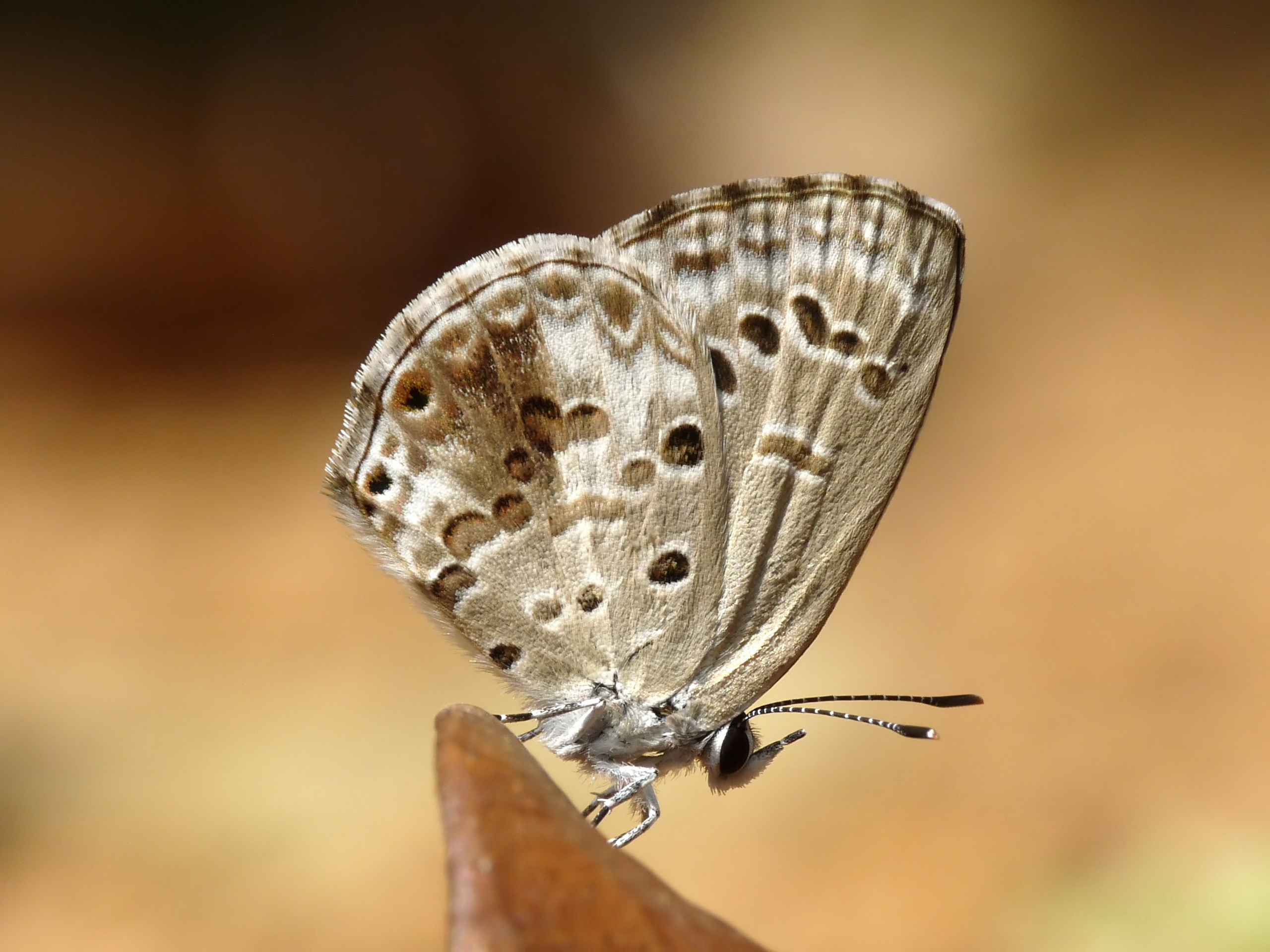
Lime blue

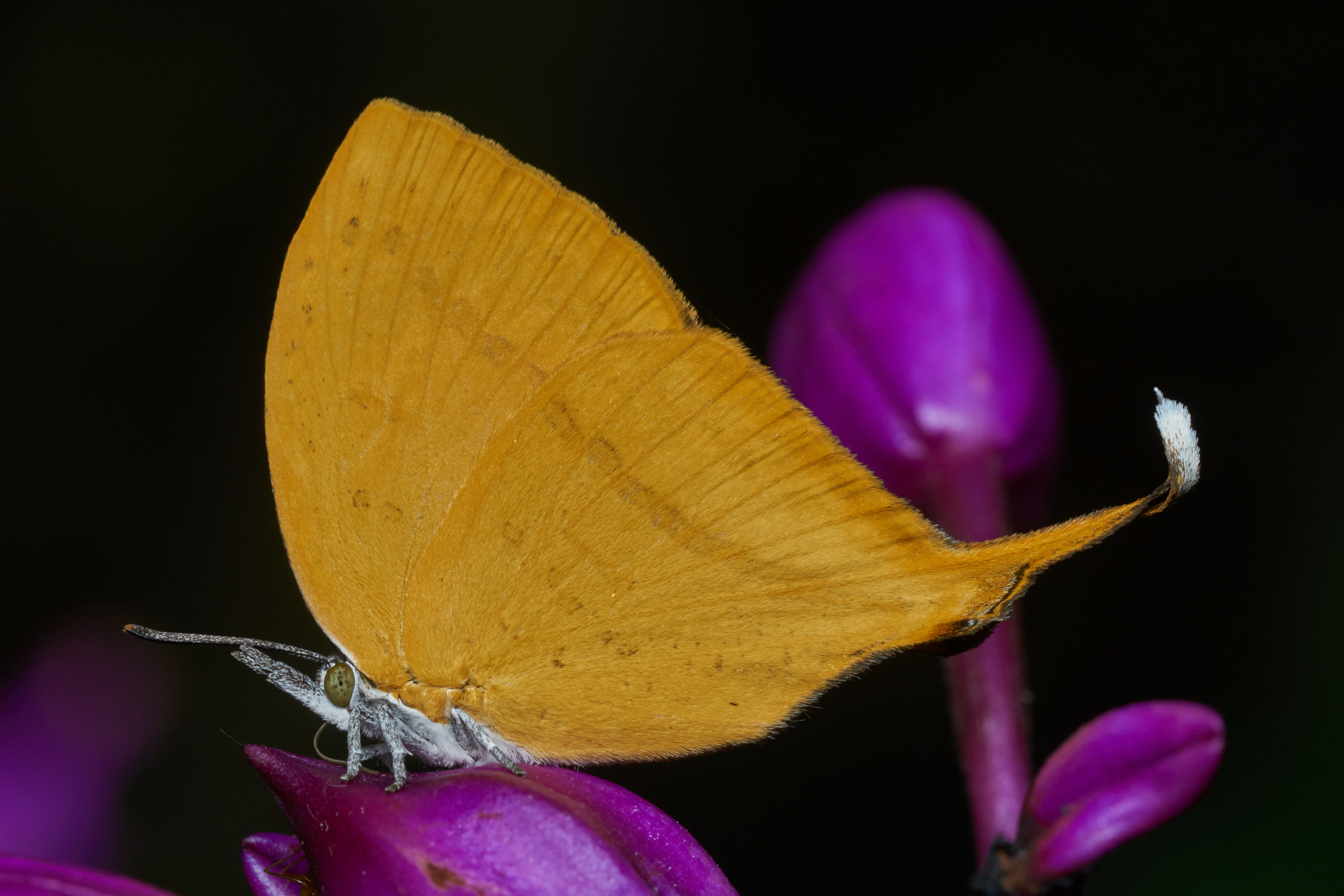
Yamfly

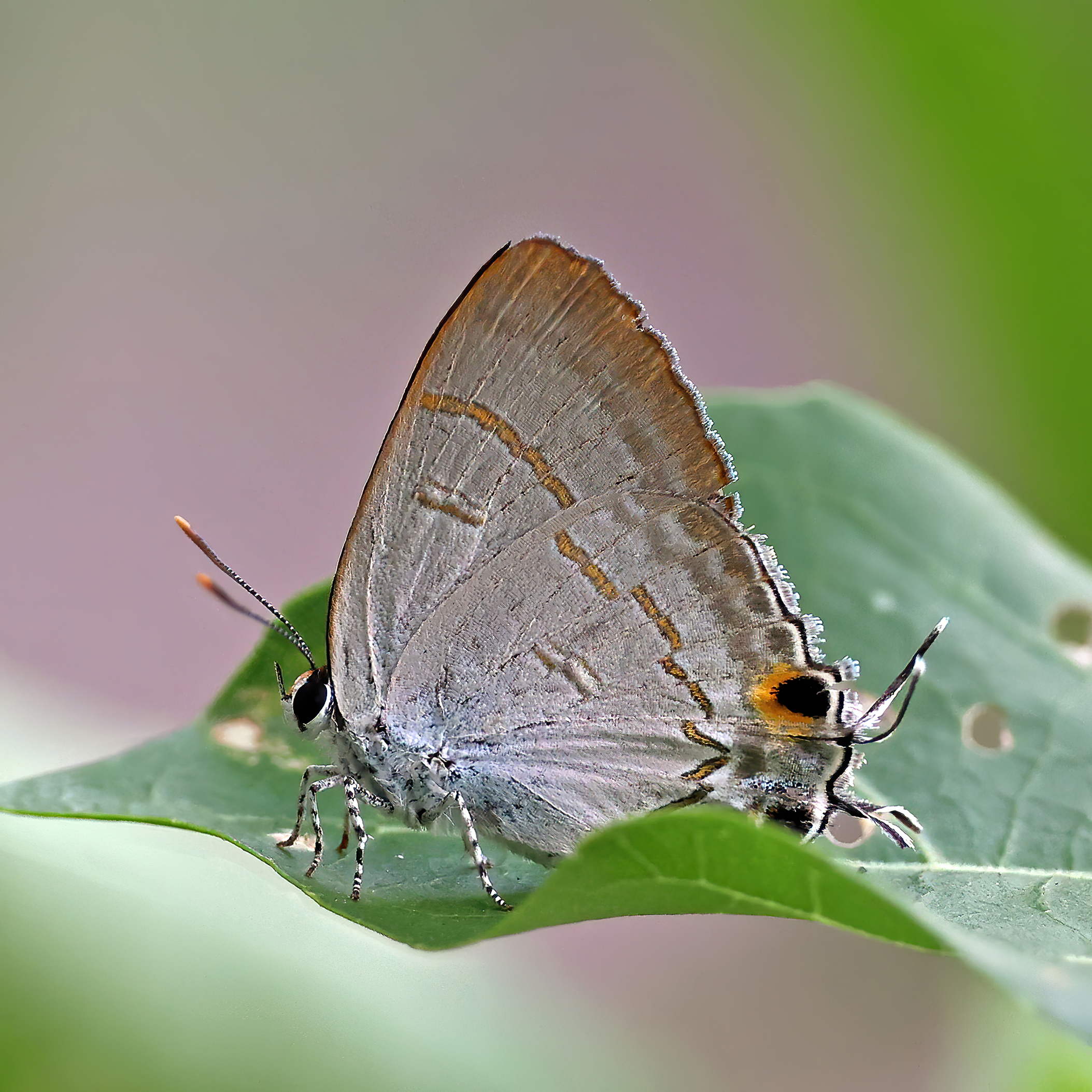
Common tit

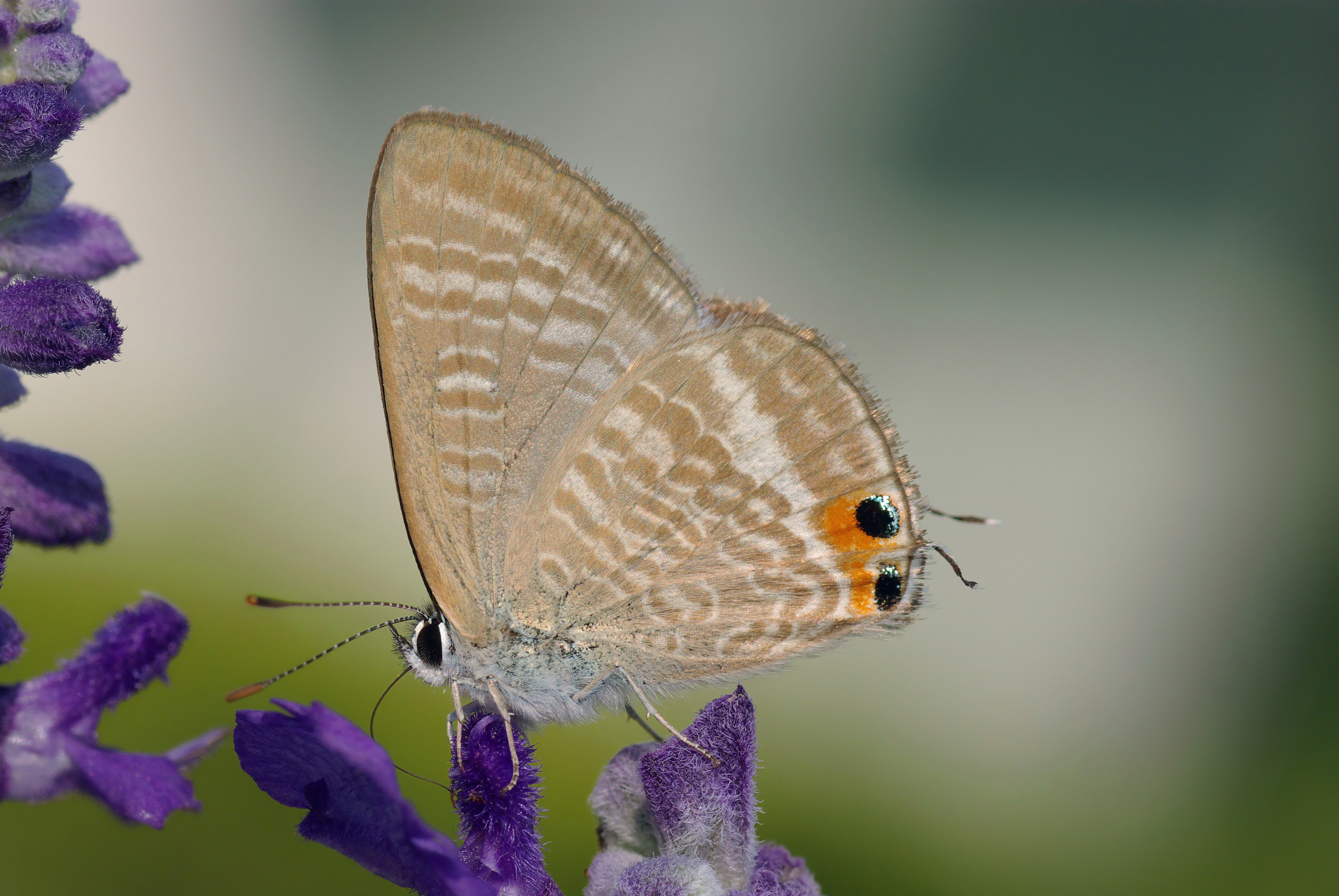
Peablue

Sixty-seven species of blues are found in the islands.

- Burmese sunbeam (Curetis saronis)
- Indian sunbeam (Curetis thetis)
- Apefly (Spalgis epius)
- Long-banded silverline (Cigaritis lohita)
- Pallid oakblue (Arhopala alesia)
- Broad-banded oakblue (Arhopala asinarus)
- Centaur oakblue (Arhopala centaurus)
- Spotless oakblue (Arhopala fulla)
- Rosy oakblue (Arhopala alea)
- Andaman tailless oakblue (Arhopala zeta)
- Purple leaf blue (Amblypodia anita)
- Acacia blue (Surendra vivarna)
- Silverstreak blue (Iraota timoleon)
- Yamfly (Loxura atymnus)
- Violet onyx (Horaga albimacula)
- Common onyx (Horaga onyx)
- White royal (Pratapa deva)
- Peacock royal (Tajuria cippus)
- Banded royal (Rachana jalindra)
- Chocolate royal (Remelana jangala)
- Common tit (Hypolycaena erylus)
- Brown tit (Hypolycaena thecloides)
- Orchid tit (Chliaria othona)
- Cornelian (Deudorix epijarbas)
- Scarce guava blue (Deudorix smilis)
- Plane (Bindahara phocides)
- Malay red flash (Rapala damona)
- Scarlet flash (Rapala dieneces)
- Slate flash (Rapala manea)
- Suffused flash (Rapala suffusa)
- Indigo flash (Rapala varuna)
- Ciliate blue (Anthene emolus)
- Dingy lineblue (Petrelaea dana)
- Rounded six-line blue (Nacaduba berenice)
- Pale four-line blue (Nacaduba hermus)
- Small four-line blue (Nacaduba pavana)
- Large four-line blue (Nacaduba pactolus)
- Jewel four-line blue (Nacaduba sanaya)
- Violet four-line blue (Nacaduba pavana)
- Banded lineblue (Prosotas aluta)
- Tailless lineblue (Prosotas dubiosa)
- Common lineblue (Prosotas nora)
- Pointed lineblue (Ionolyce helicon)
- Felder's lineblue (Catopyrops ancyra)
- Elbowed pierrot (Caleta elna)
- Straight pierrot (Caleta roxus)
- Banded blue pierrot (Discolampa ethion)
- Metallic cerulean (Jamides alecto)
- Dark cerulean (Jamides bochus)
- Common cerulean (Jamides celeno)
- Glistening cerulean (Jamides elpis)
- Ferrar's cerulean (Jamides ferrari)
- Frosted cerulean (Jamides kankena)
- Silver forget-me-not (Catochrysops panormus)
- Forget-me-not (Catochrysops strabo)
- Peablue (Lampides boeticus)
- Common pierrot (Castalius rosimon)
- Dark grass blue (Zizeeria karsandra)
- Lesser grass blue (Zizina otis)
- Tiny grass blue (Zizula hylax)
- Indian cupid (Chilades parrhasius)
- Quaker (Neopithecops zalmora)
- Malayan (Megisba malaya)
- Common hedge blue (Acytolepis puspa)
- Gram blue (Euchrysops cnejus)
- Lime blue (Chilades lajus)

== Brush-footed butterflies (Family: Nymphalidae) ==
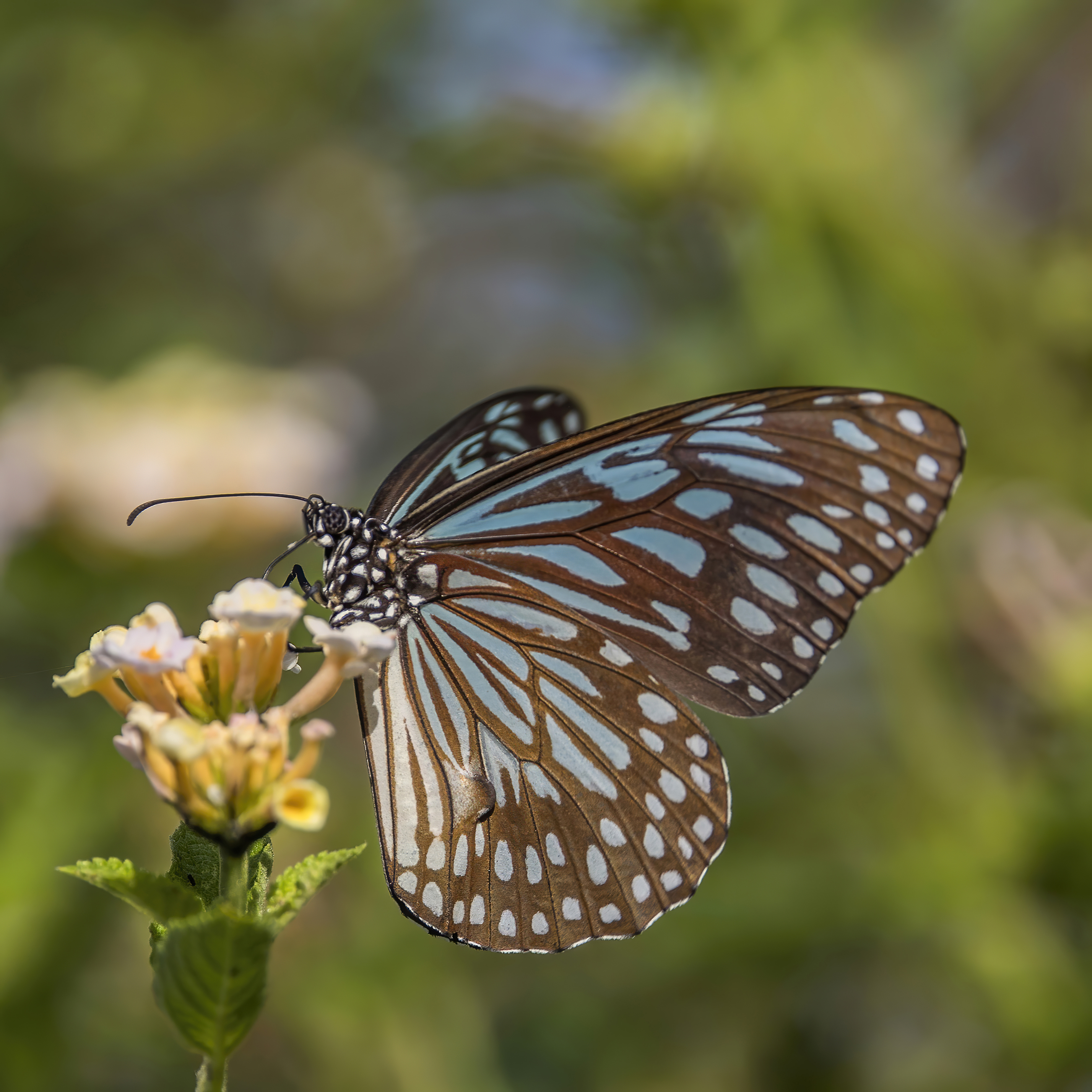
Scarce blue tiger

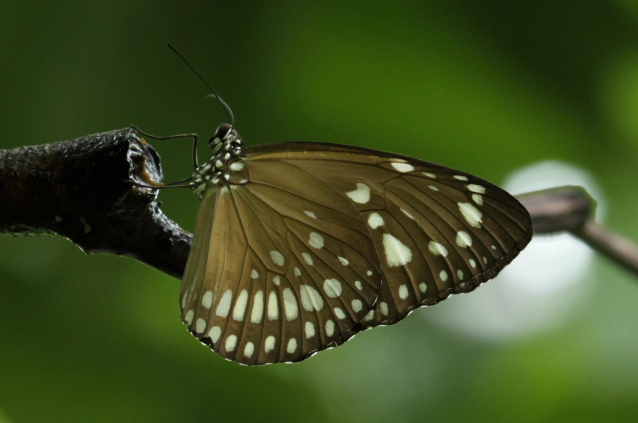
Andaman crow

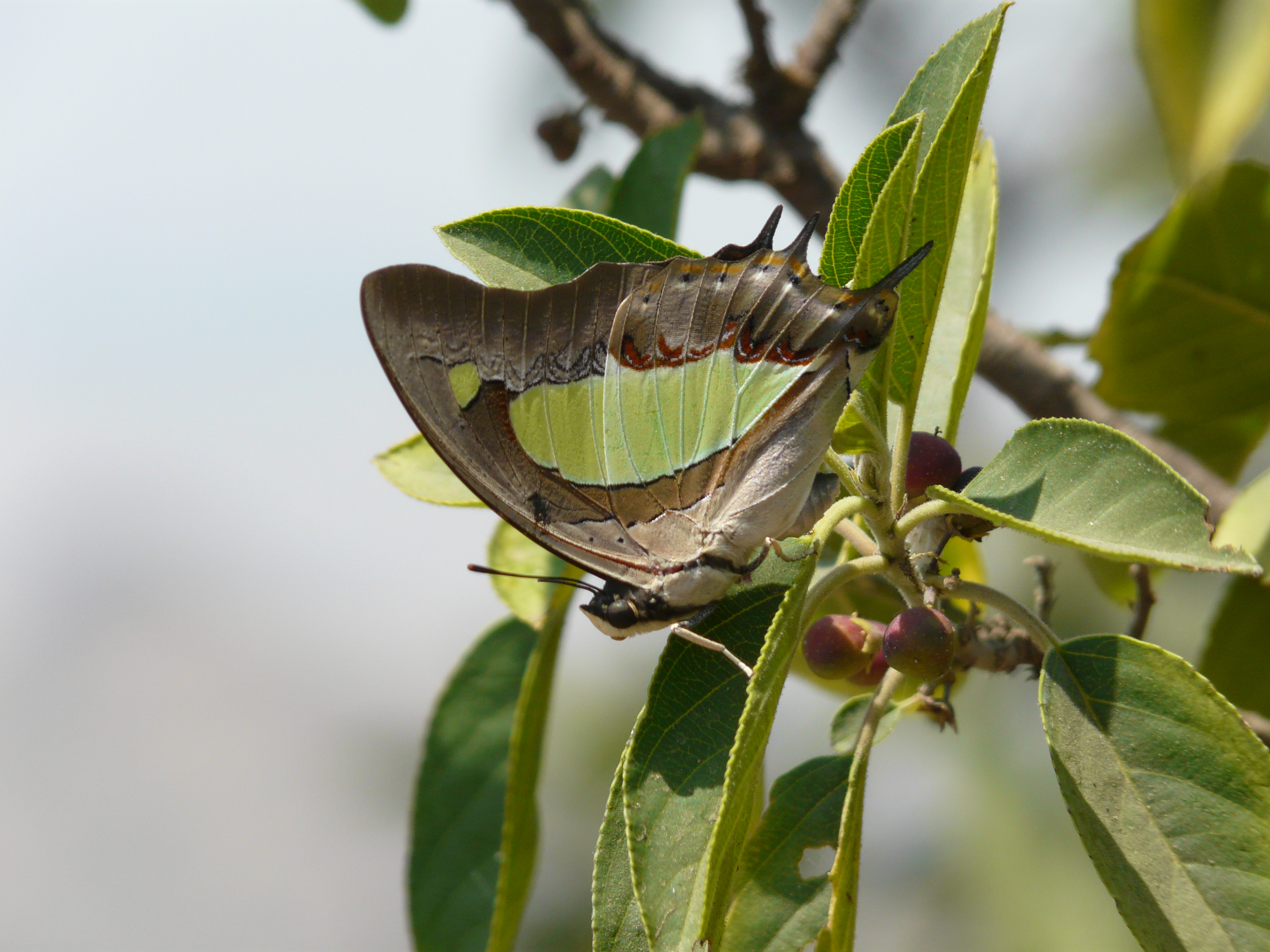
Common nawab

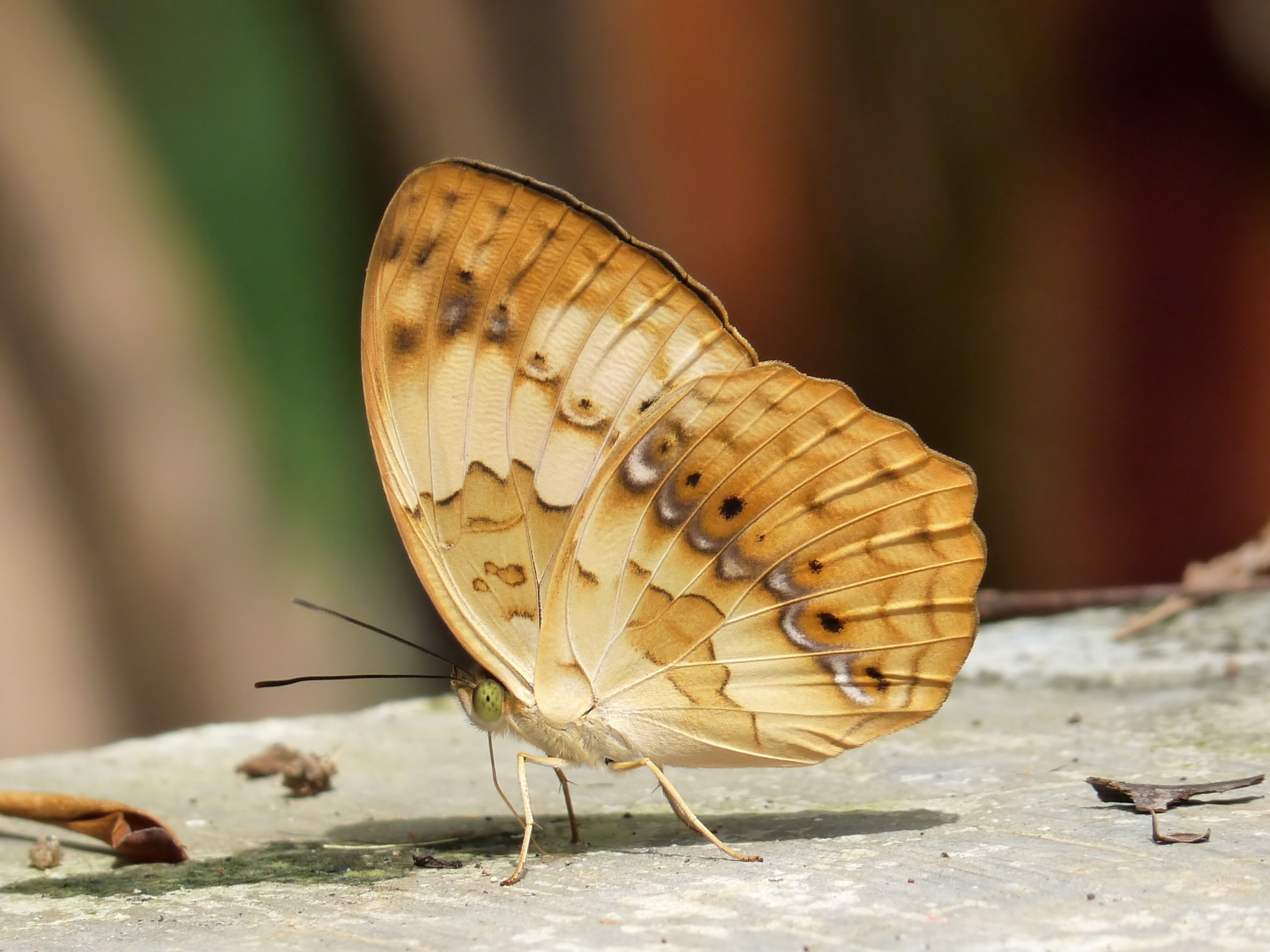
Rustic

Seventy-three species of brush-footed butterflies are found on the islands.

- Malay tiger (Danaus affinis)
- Glassy tiger (Parantica aglea)
- Dark glassy tiger (Parantica agleoides)
- White tiger (Danaus melanippus)
- Grey glassy tiger (Ideopsis juventa)
- Chocolate tiger (Parantica melaneus)
- Scarce blue tiger (Tirumala gautama)
- Blue tiger (Tirumala limniace)
- Dark blue tiger (Tirumala septentrionis)
- Andaman tree nymph (Idea agamarschana)
- Andaman crow (Euploea andamanensis)
- Blue-banded king crow (Euploea eunice)
- Spotted black crow (Euploea crameri)
- Blue-spotted crow (Euploea midamus)
- Great crow (Euploea phaenareta)
- Striped blue crow (Euploea mulciber)
- Double-branded crow (Euploea sylvester)
- Common nawab (Polyura athamas)
- Blue nawab (Polyura schreiber)
- Tawny rajah (Charaxes bernardus)
- Andaman palmking (Amathusia andamanensis)
- Great duffer (Discophora timora)
- Andaman palmfly (Elymnias cottonis)
- Nicobar palmfly (Elymnias panthera)
- Common evening brown (Melanitis leda)
- Great evening brown (Melanitis zitenius)
- Bamboo treebrown (Lethe europa)
- Dark brand bushbrown (Mycalesis mineus)
- Andaman bushbrown (Mycalesis radza)
- Nicobar bushbrown (Mycalesis manii)
- Long-brand bushbrown (Mycalesis visala)
- Dingy bushbrown (Mycalesis perseus)
- Smooth-eyed bushbrown (Orsotriaena medus)
- Clear sailer (Neptis clinia)
- Common sailer (Neptis hylas)
- Chestnut-streaked sailer (Neptis jumbah)
- Yellowjack sailer (Lasippa viraja)
- Short banded sailer (Neptis columella)
- Common lascar (Pantoporia hordonia)
- Extra lascar (Pantoporia sandaka)
- Andaman sergeant (Athyma rufula)
- Commander (Moduza procris)
- Clipper (Parthenos sylvia)
- Andaman viscount (Tanaecia cibaritis)
- Common baron (Euthalia aconthea)
- Banded marquis (Bassarona teuta)
- Small leopard (Phalanta alcippe)
- Rustic (Cupha erymanthis)
- Cruiser (Vindula erota)
- Banded yeoman (Cirrochroa orissa)
- Nicobar yeoman (Cirrochroa nicobarica)
- Common yeoman (Cirrochroa tyche)
- Large yeoman (Cirrochroa aoris)
- Angled castor (Ariadne ariadne)
- Banded dandy (Laringa horsfieldii)
- Yellow pasha (Herona marathus)
- Tawny coster (Acraea terpsicore)
- Painted courtesan (Euripus consimilis)
- Marbled map (Cyrestis cocles)
- Common map (Cyrestis thyodamas)
- Nicobar map (Cyrestis tabula)
- Painted lady (Vanessa cardui)
- Grey pansy (Junonia atlites)
- Yellow pansy (Junonia hierta)
- Peacock pansy (Junonia almana)
- Blue pansy (Junonia orithya)
- Malayan eggfly (Hypolimnas anomala)
- Great eggfly (Hypolimnas bolina)
- Danaid eggfly (Hypolimnas misippus)
- Andaman oakleaf (Kallima albofasciata)
- Autumn leaf (Doleschallia bisaltide)
- Lurcher (Yoma sabina)
- Red lacewing (Cethosia biblis)
- Leopard lacewing (Cethosia cyane)
