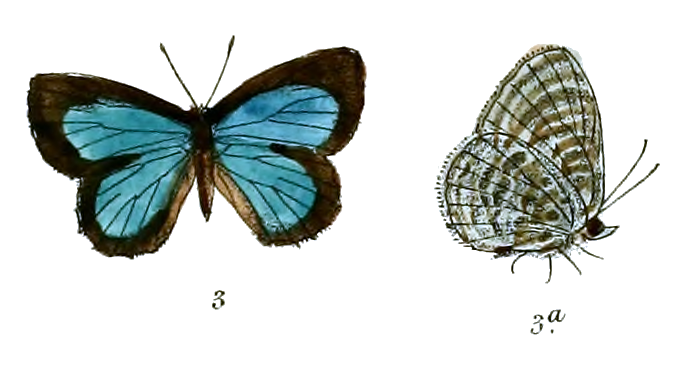
- From Lepidoptera Indica, Volume 8

Scientific classification
- Kingdom: Animalia
- Phylum: Arthropoda
- Class: Insecta
- Order: Lepidoptera
- Family: Lycaenidae
- Subfamily: Theclinae
- Tribe: Arhopalini
- Genus: Arhopala
- Species: A. zeta

Binomial name
- Arhopala zeta Moore, 1877

Synonyms
- Narathura zeta Amblypodia zeta

= Arhopala zeta =

Andaman tailless oakblue

Species of butterfly

Arhopala zeta, the Andaman tailless oakblue, is a species of butterfly in the family Lycaenidae. It was discovered by Frederic Moore in 1877. It is found in the Andaman and Nicobar Islands in India.

== Description ==
The female is a brilliant pale cobalt-blue on the upper side with the borders black in color. The underside is light cinnamon brown. It has a wingspan of 2.8 centimeters.

This species was once separate from Arhopala roona, which has now been merged into zeta. It differentiates from Arhopala aeeta by having a grey-brown underside and also being much lighter.
