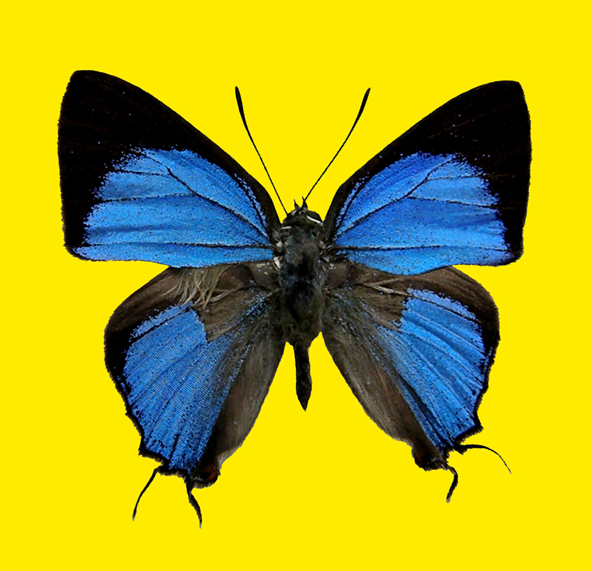
- Male upperside
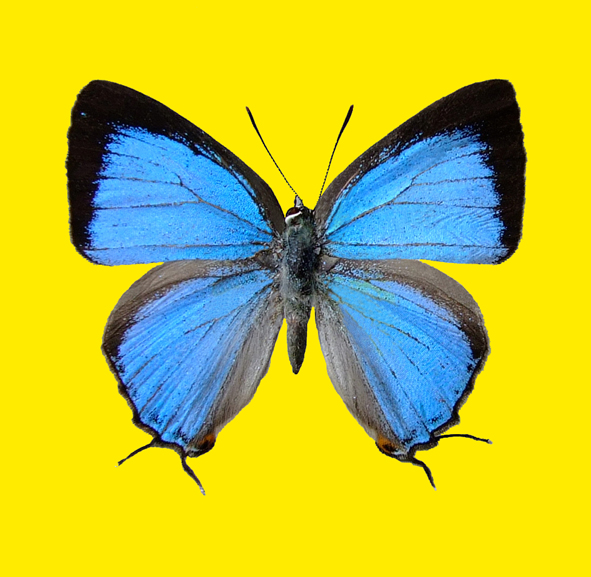
- Female upperside

Scientific classification
- Kingdom: Animalia
- Phylum: Arthropoda
- Class: Insecta
- Order: Lepidoptera
- Family: Lycaenidae
- Genus: Pratapa
- Species: P. tyotaroi

Binomial name
- Pratapa tyotaroi H. Hayashi, 1981

= Pratapa tyotaroi =

Species of butterfly

Pratapa tyotaroi is a butterfly of the family Lycaenidae first described by Hisakazu Hayashi in 1981. It is endemic to the Philippines. On Mindanao island it is distributed on Mount Apo, Mount Kitanglad and Mount Masara.

Its forewing length is 13–18 mm.

Etymology: The specific name is dedicated to the nickname of Yasusuke Nishiyama, a Japanese lepidopterist.

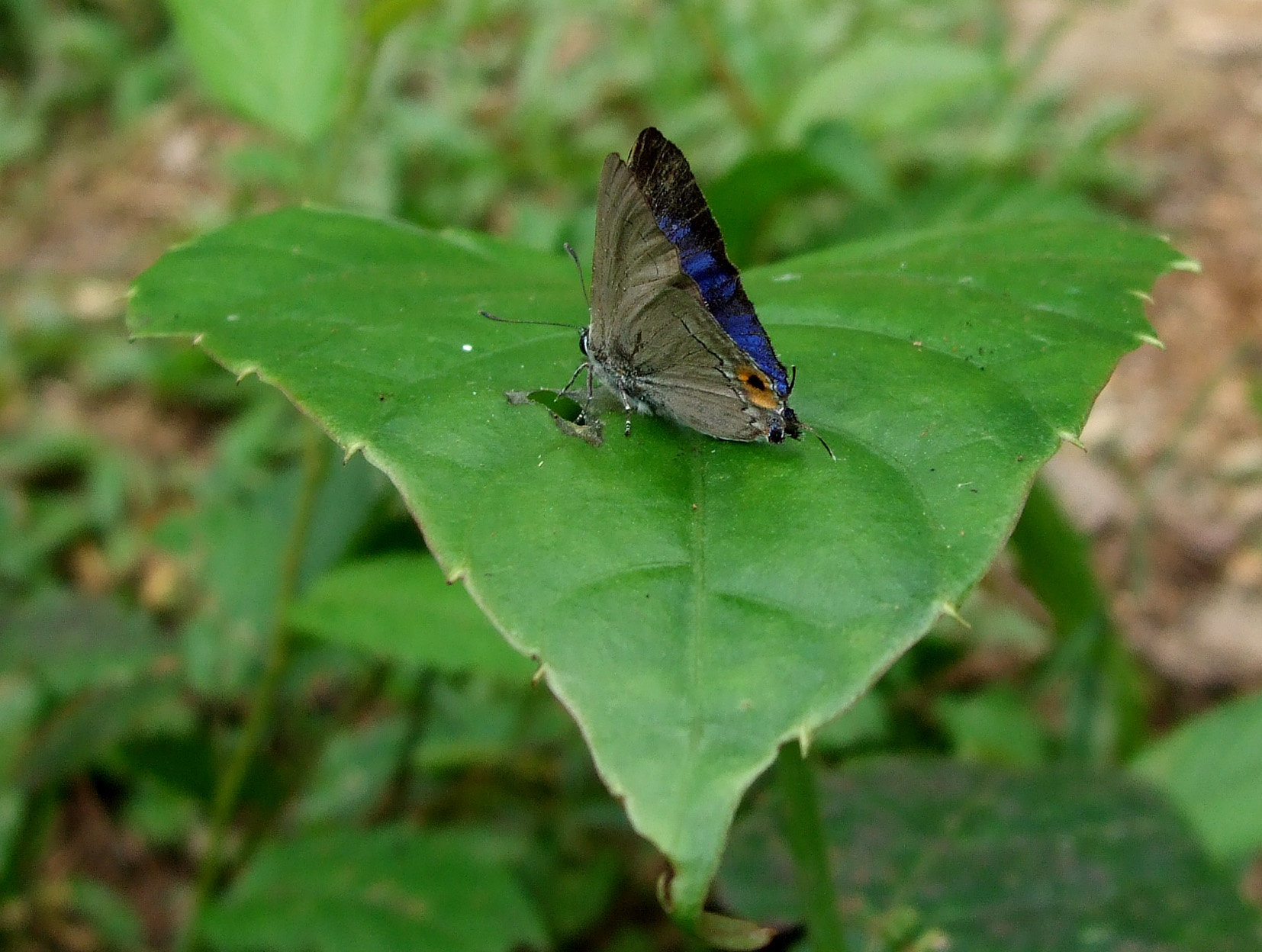
Male, Mount Apo, Mindanao

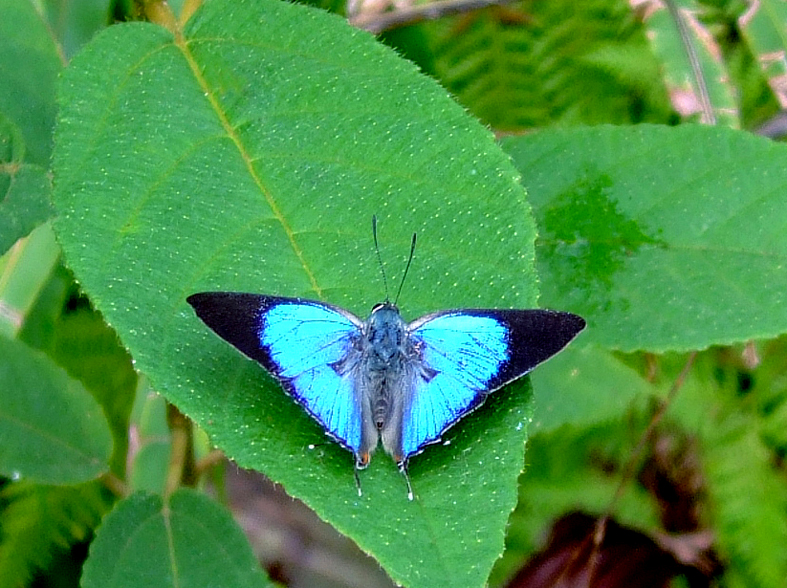
Male, Mount Apo

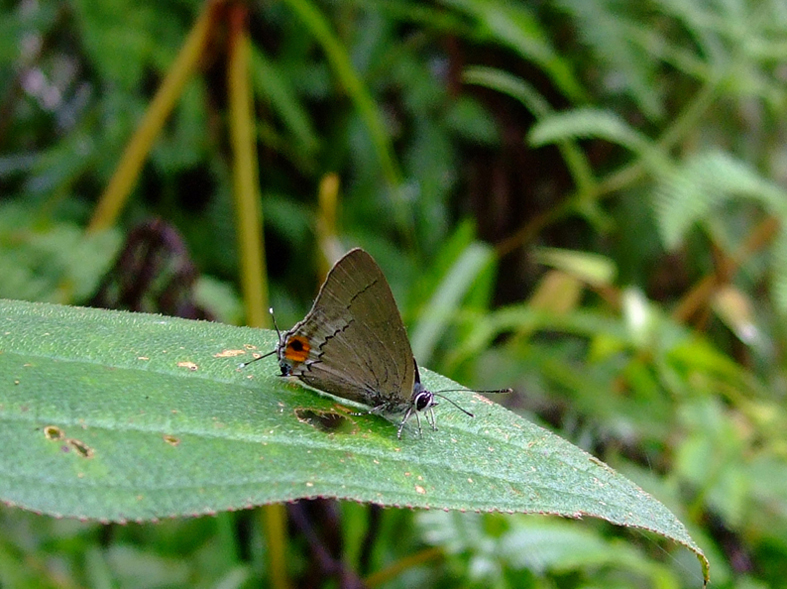
Male, Mount Apo

== Subspecies ==
F. Danielsen and Colin G. Treadaway (2004) categorized subspecies P. t. cadohaana as vulnerable and subspecies P. t. ismaeli as lower risk, conservation dependent. There are four subspecies:

- Pratapa tyotaroi tyotaroi H. Hayashi,[1981] (Marinduque and Luzon)
- Pratapa tyotaroi ismaeli H. Hayashi, Schrőder & Treadaway, [1983] (Mindanao)
- Pratapa tyotaroi mindorensis Treadaway & Nuyda,[1998] (Mindoro)
- Pratapa tyotaroi cadohaana Seki,[1997] (Leyte)
