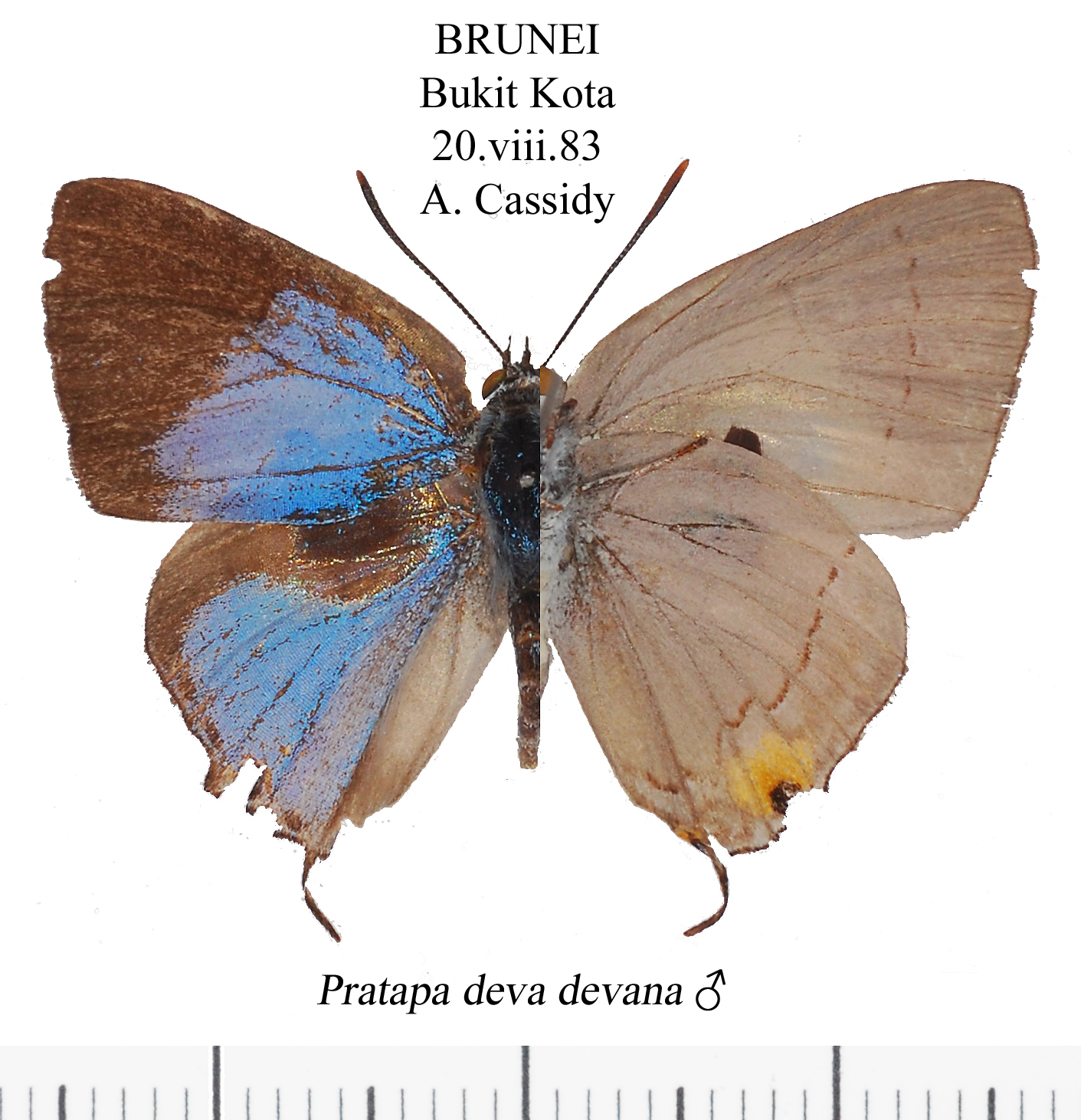
- Pratapa deva

Scientific classification
- Domain: Eukaryota
- Kingdom: Animalia
- Phylum: Arthropoda
- Class: Insecta
- Order: Lepidoptera
- Family: Lycaenidae
- Tribe: Iolaini
- Genus: Pratapa; Moore, 1881

= Pratapa =

Butterfly genus in family Lycaenidae

Pratapa is a genus of butterflies in the family Lycaenidae. The species of this genus are found in the far eastern Palearctic realm (China) and in the Indomalayan realm.

== Species ==
- Pratapa cameria de Nicéville Sulawesi
- Pratapa deva (Moore, 1858)
- Pratapa icetas (Hewitson, 1865)
- Pratapa icetoides (Elwes, 1893)
- Pratapa ismaeli Hayashi, Schröder & Treadaway, 1983 may be Pratapa tyotaroi ssp. ismaeli Hayashi, Schröder & Treadaway, 1983 Philippines (Mindanao)
- Pratapa tyotaroi Hayashi, 1981
