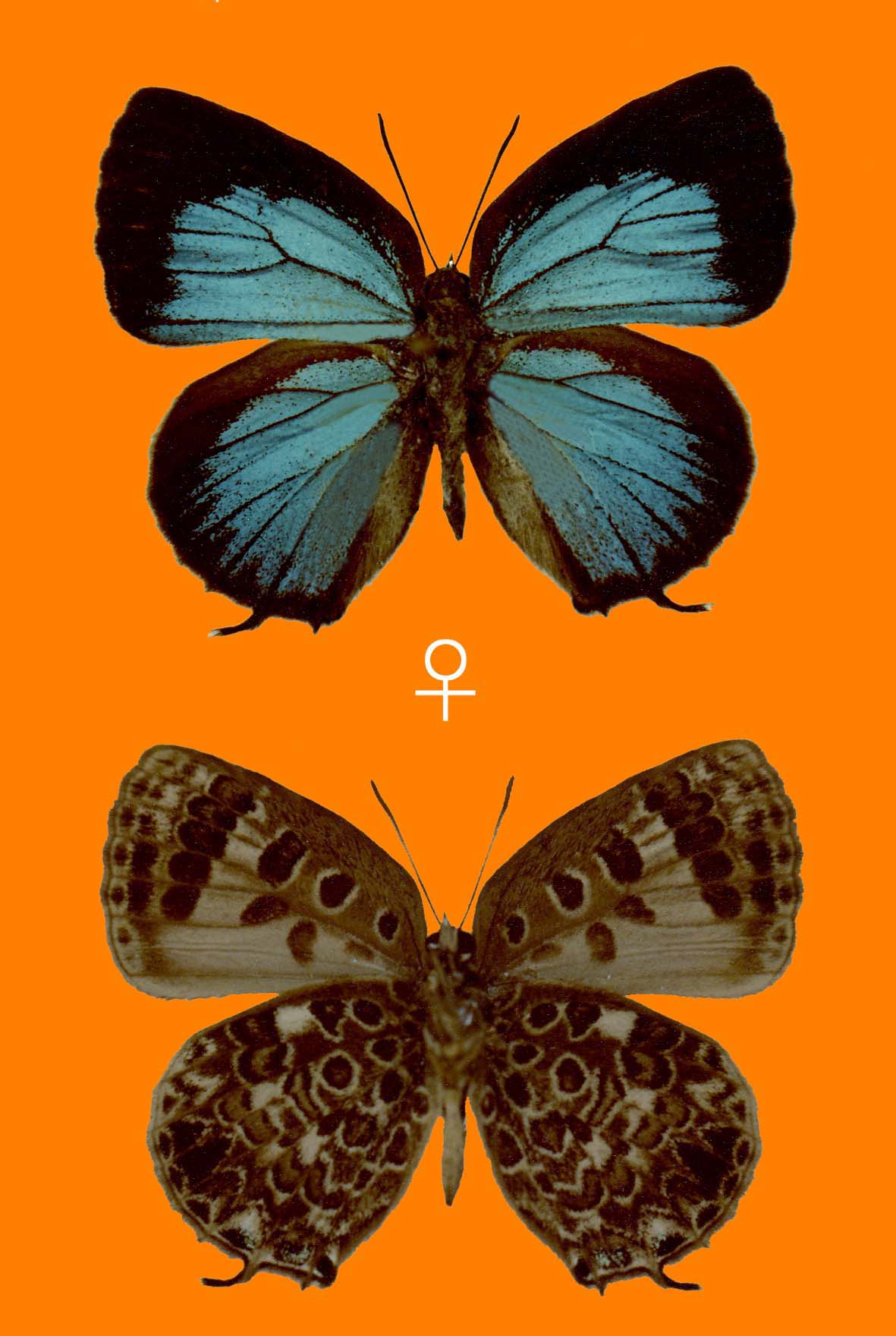
- Arhopala alesia mio, female

Scientific classification
- Kingdom: Animalia
- Phylum: Arthropoda
- Clade: Pancrustacea
- Class: Insecta
- Order: Lepidoptera
- Family: Lycaenidae
- Genus: Arhopala
- Species: A. alesia

Binomial name
- Arhopala alesia (C. & R. Felder, [1865])

Synonyms
- Amblypodia alesia C. & R. Felder, [1865]

= Arhopala alesia =

Pallid oakblue

Species of butterfly

Arhopala alesia, the pallid oakblue, (sometimes in Amblypodia) is a small butterfly found in India that belongs to the lycaenids or blues family.

== Description ==
The forewing length is about 18mm.Beneath quite similar to oberthuri, but with a long tail on the hindwing. The female is above light greenish-blue.

== Subspecies ==
At least 5 subspecies are listed:

- A. a. alesia
- A. a. wimberleyi (de Nicéville, 1887)
- A. a. sacharja Fruhstorfer, 1914
- A. a. mio (Hayashi, 1981)
- A. a. soloni M. & T. Okano, 1995

== Range ==
The butterfly occurs in India in the Andamans and from Dawnas to southern Myanmar.

The nominotypical subspecies is distributed on Bohol, Luzon, Marinduque, Mindoro, Mindanao & Tawitawi Islands. The subspecies soloni is on Leyte Island. The subspecies mio is found on Negros Island.

== Status ==
William Harry Evans described the species as rare in 1932.

== See also ==
- List of butterflies of India (Lycaenidae)
