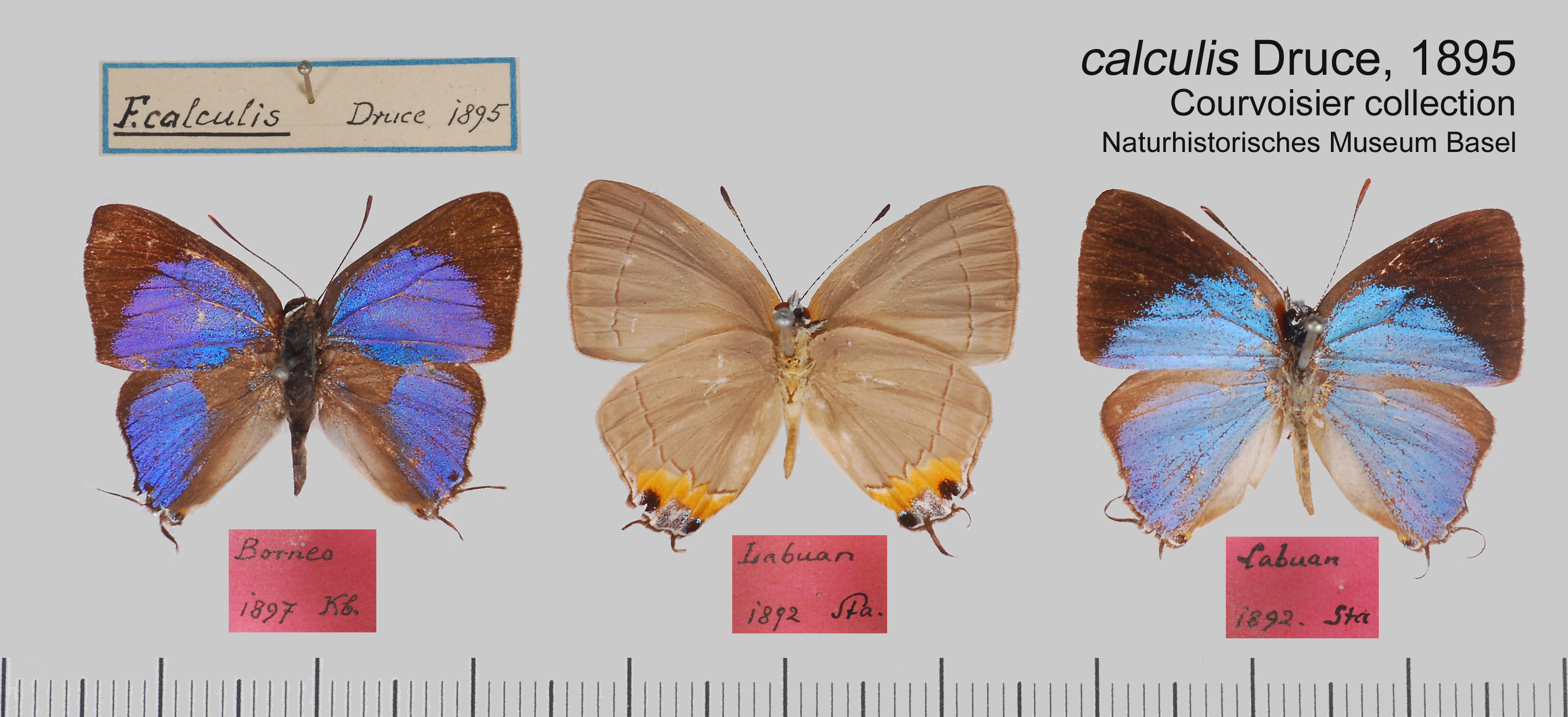
- P. i. calculis
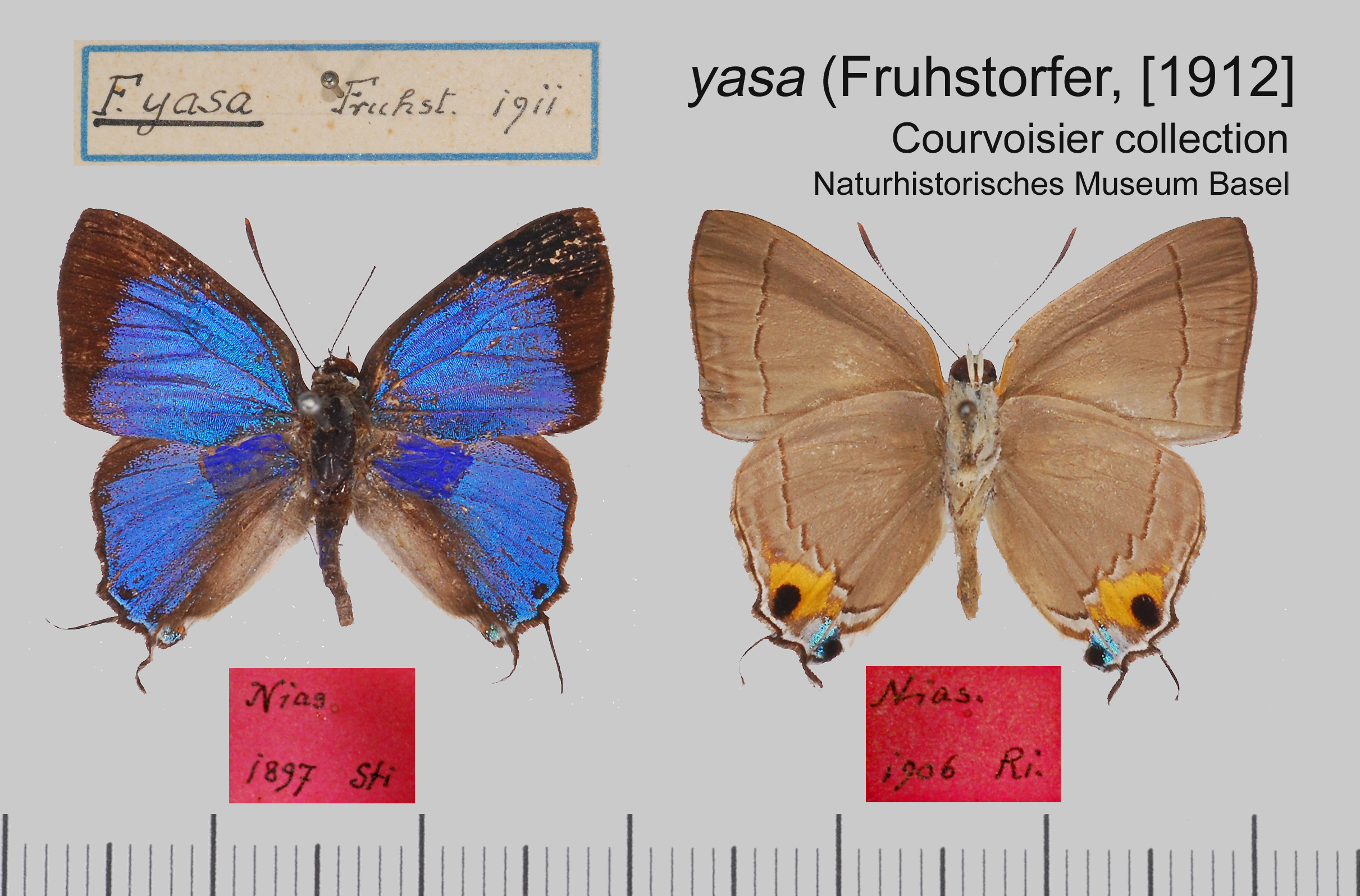
- P. i. yasa From the Courvoisier Collection, Basel, Switzerland

Scientific classification
- Domain: Eukaryota
- Kingdom: Animalia
- Phylum: Arthropoda
- Class: Insecta
- Order: Lepidoptera
- Family: Lycaenidae
- Genus: Pratapa
- Species: P. icetoides

Binomial name
- Pratapa icetoides (Elwes, 1892)

= Pratapa icetoides =

Blue royal

Species of butterfly

Pratapa icetoides, the blue royal, is a species of blue butterfly (Lycaenidae) found in the Indomalayan realm.

== Range ==
The butterfly occurs in India from Assam, the Khasi Hills, eastwards and across to north and south Myanmar, Thailand, Peninsular Malaysia, Singapore, Java, Borneo, Sumatra, Sulawesi and Nias.

== Subspecies ==
- P. i. icetoides North India, Burma, North Thailand, Assam, Burma
- P. i. cretheus (de Nicéville, 1895) Sumatra, W.Java
- P. i. carmentalis (de Nicéville, [1893]) Khasia Hills
- P. i. yasa (Fruhstorfer, 1912) Nias
- P. i. ecphanathus (Fruhstorfer, 1912) East Java
- P. i. calculis Druce, 1895 South Thailand, Peninsular Malaya, Singapore, Borneo
- P. i. marikit Schröder & Treadaway, 1986 Philippines, Palawan

== Taxonomy ==
The butterfly was previously classified as Camena icetoides and Ancema icetoides.

== Status ==
William Harry Evans in 1932 and Mark Alexander Wynter-Blyth in 1957 both describe the species as not being rare.

== Description ==
The butterfly has a wingspan of 30 to 32 mm.

The male white-banded royal above is a shining bright blue up to base of 4 in the forewing. On the hindwing is a mid-costal white patch. The male has a large but inconspicuous brand on the upperside of the hindwing. The female is a pale dull powdery blue with a broad black border on both wings. The underside is pale brown with no bars end cell. The forewing has an outwardly white-edged discal line curved inwards.

== See also ==
- List of butterflies of India (Lycaenidae)
