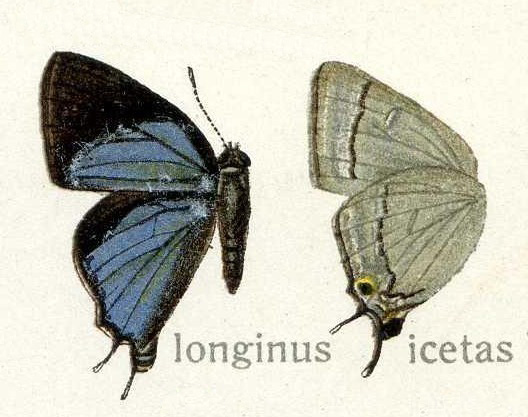
- Underside right. On the left is an image of the upperside of the very similar longinus

Scientific classification
- Kingdom: Animalia
- Phylum: Arthropoda
- Class: Insecta
- Order: Lepidoptera
- Family: Lycaenidae
- Genus: Pratapa
- Species: P. icetas

Binomial name
- Pratapa icetas (Hewitson, 1865)

= Pratapa icetas =

Dark blue royal

Species of butterfly

Pratapa icetas, the dark blue royal, is a species of lycaenid or blue butterfly found in Pakistan and India.
