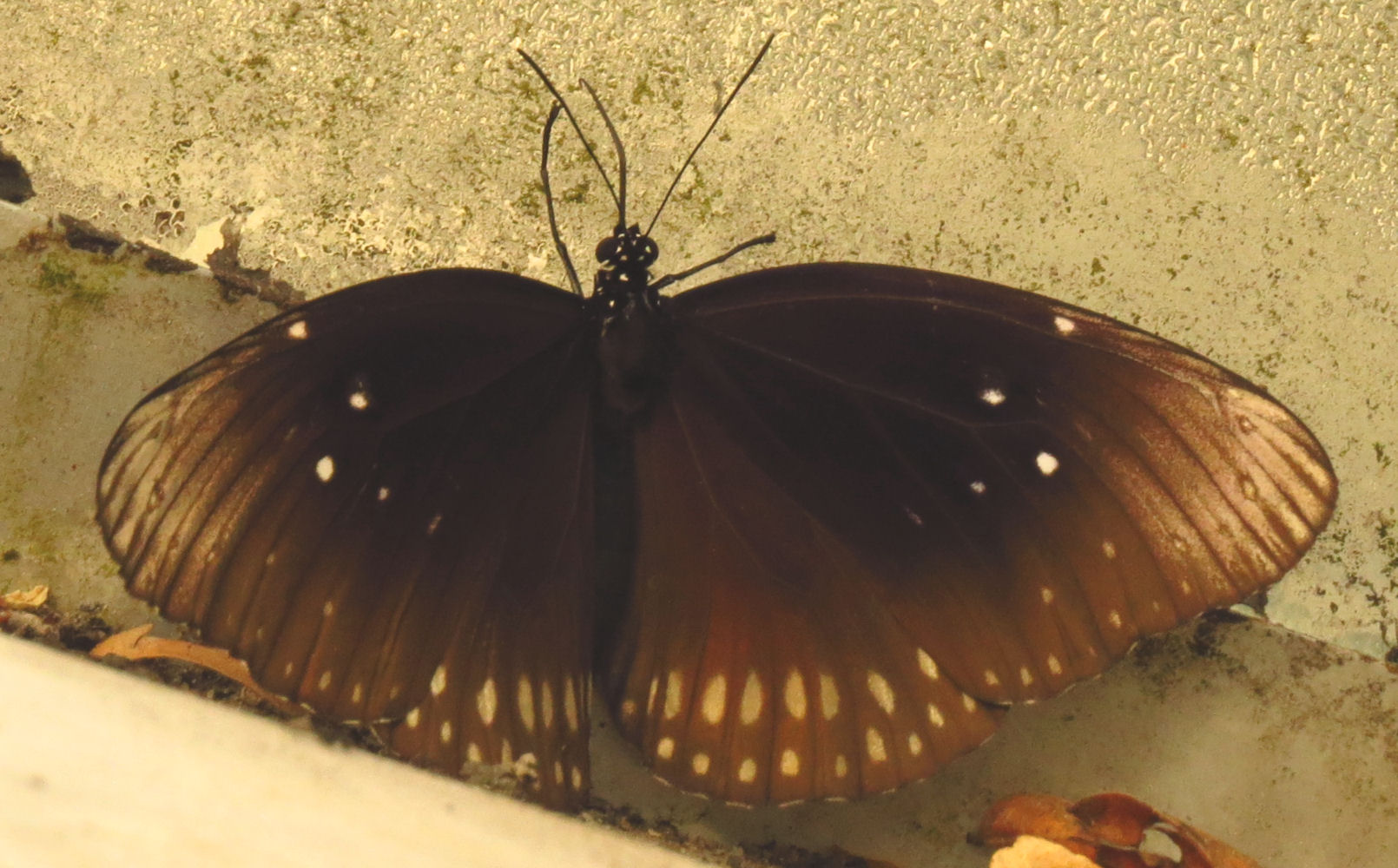

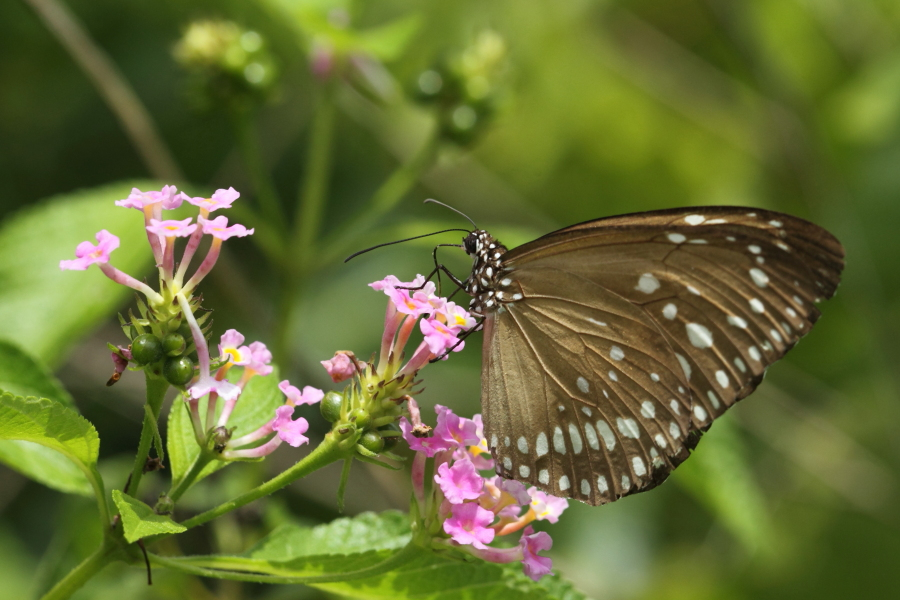

Conservation status
- Vulnerable (IUCN 2.3)

Scientific classification
- Kingdom: Animalia
- Phylum: Arthropoda
- Clade: Pancrustacea
- Class: Insecta
- Order: Lepidoptera
- Family: Nymphalidae
- Genus: Euploea
- Species: E. andamanensis

Binomial name
- Euploea andamanensis Atkinson, 1874

= Andaman crow =

Species of butterfly

The Andaman crow (Euploea andamanensis) is a species of nymphalid butterfly in the Danainae subfamily. It is found in India and Burma.

== Description ==
Males have the termen of the forewing slightly concave in the middle. Hindwing broadly ovate. Upperside very pale Van Dyke brown, darkening outwardly. Forewings and hindwings with subterminal and terminal series of white spots. In the forewing, in addition, a spot in apex of cell and two discal spots; in the subterminal series the lower three spots diamond-shaped, very much larger than the upper spots, which latter are curved inwards opposite apex of wing. On the hindwing the spots in both series are elongate, the spots in the subterminal longer than the spots in the terminal series. Underside very similar, the white spots larger, the discal series on the forewing often complete. On the hindwing some additional spots near base, a spot at apex of cell and a discal series of five or six small spots. Antennae dark brown; head, thorax and abdomen pale silky brown, spotted, chiefly beneath, with white.
