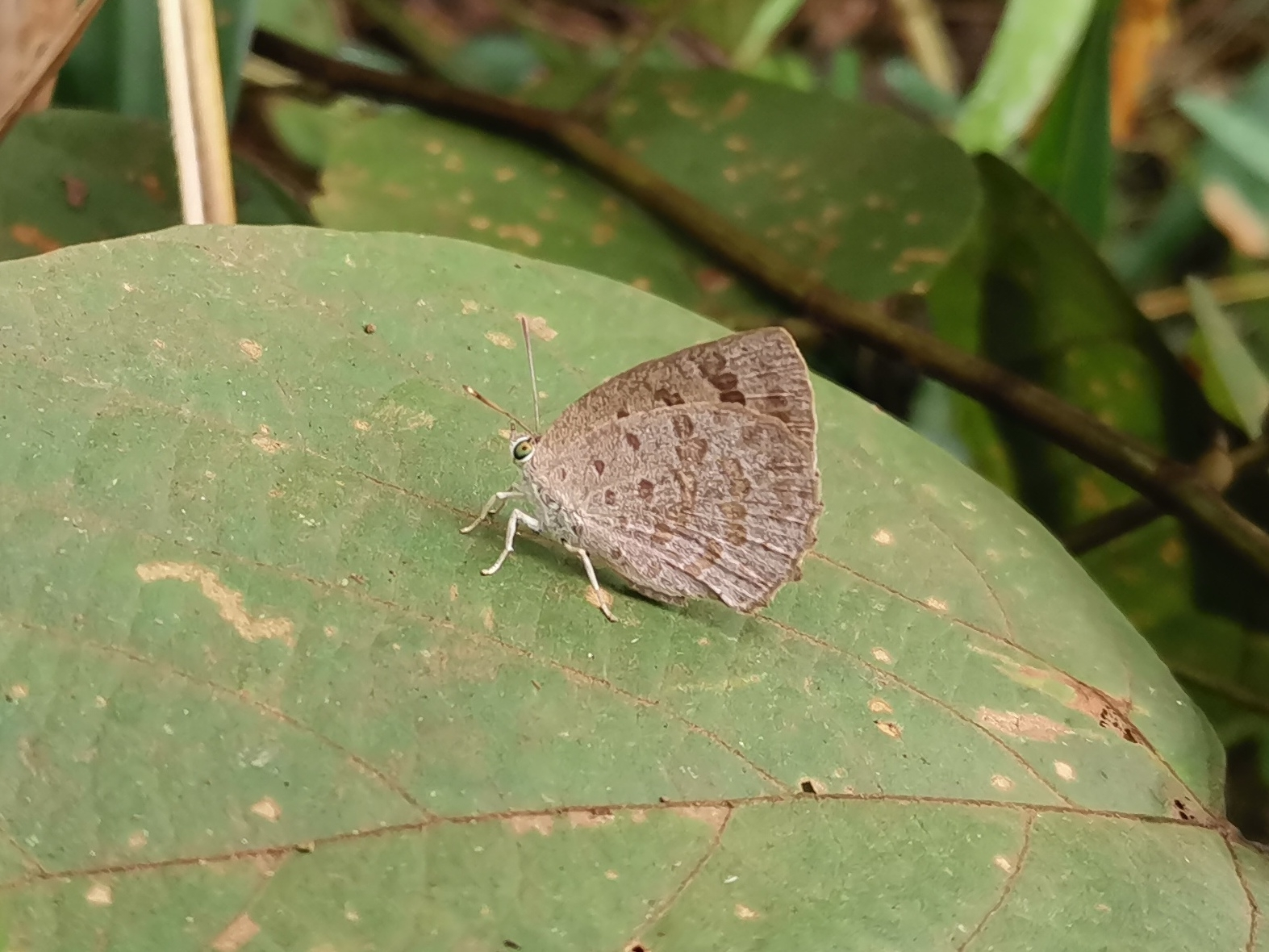

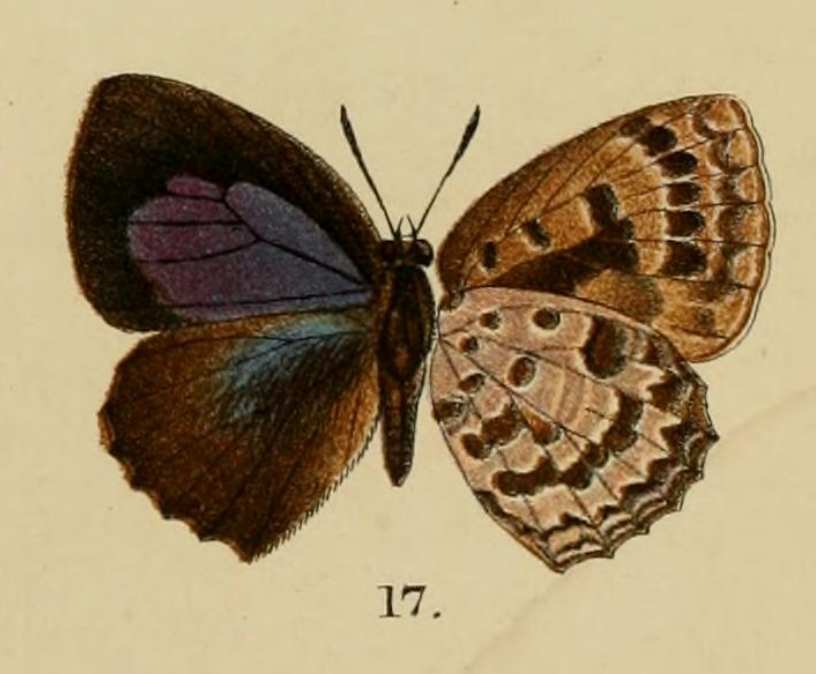
- From Journal of the Bombay Natural History Society, 1886

Scientific classification
- Kingdom: Animalia
- Phylum: Arthropoda
- Clade: Pancrustacea
- Class: Insecta
- Order: Lepidoptera
- Family: Lycaenidae
- Genus: Arhopala
- Species: A. aeeta

Binomial name
- Arhopala aeeta de Nicéville, 1893

Synonyms
- Narathura aeeta

= Arhopala aeeta =

Species of butterfly

Arhopala aeeta is a butterfly in the family Lycaenidae. It was described by Lionel de Nicéville in 1893. It is found in Myanmar and northern Thailand.

== Description ==
Both the wings of the female are bluish-purple on top, and the underside is pinkish-grey with the markings in a dark brown color.

It is differentiated from the similar Arhopala rama by the absence of tail, and from Arhopala dodonaea by being more whitish and more prominent hindwing markings.

It has a wingspan of roughly 4.0–4.3 centimeters. It is not rare in semi-dried forests at low to moderate elevation.
