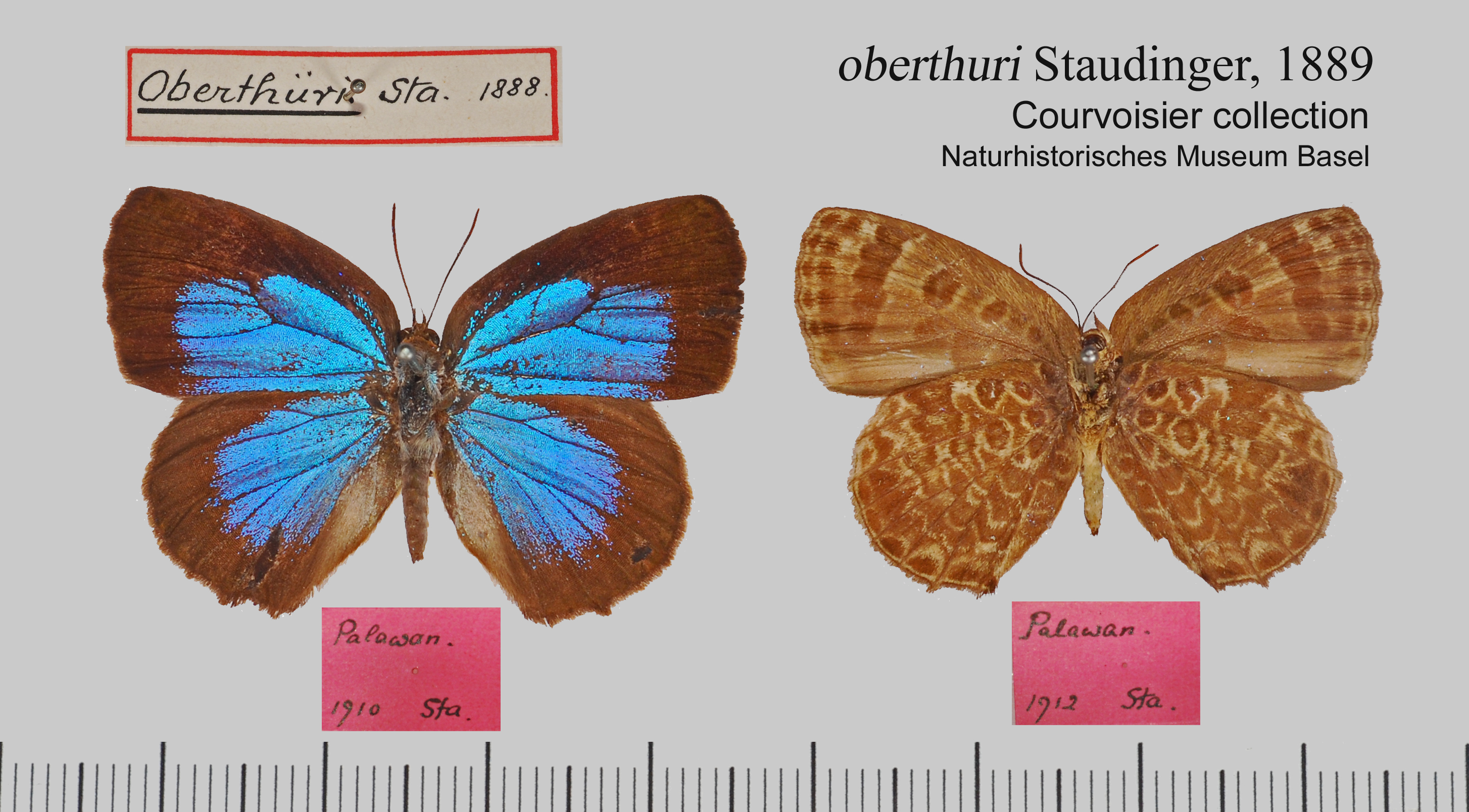
- Arhopala alaconia oberthuri female Courvoisier Collection, Basel

Scientific classification
- Kingdom: Animalia
- Phylum: Arthropoda
- Clade: Pancrustacea
- Class: Insecta
- Order: Lepidoptera
- Family: Lycaenidae
- Genus: Arhopala
- Species: A. alaconia

Binomial name
- Arhopala alaconia (Hewitson, 1869)

Synonyms
- Amblypodia alaconia Hewitson, 1869; Arhopala aloana Corbet, 1941; Narathura alaconia media Evans, 1957; Narathura alaconia media f. kempi Eliot, 1959; Amblypodia oberthuri Staudinger, 1889

= Arhopala alaconia =

Species of butterfly

Arhopala alaconia is a species of butterfly belonging to the lycaenid family described by William Chapman Hewitson in 1869. It is found in Southeast Asia (Borneo, Burma, Thailand, Peninsular Malaya and Palawan).

== Description ==
At once recognisable by the very broad (as much as 5 mm) black distal band (also in the male). Beneath the postmedian band of the hindwing is irregular and interrupted. A. oberthuri Stgr. [now subspecies] also has a very broad marginal band above; but the under surface is muchmore irregularly marked. Besides separated from alaconia by a distinct anal lobe of the hindwing; it has, however, no tails.

== Subspecies ==
- Arhopala alaconia alaconia (Borneo)
- Arhopala alaconia aloana Corbet, 1941 (central Burma)
- Arhopala alaconia media (Evans, 1957) (Mergui, southern Thailand, Peninsular Malaysia)
- Arhopala alaconia oberthuri (Staudinger, 1889) (Palawan)
