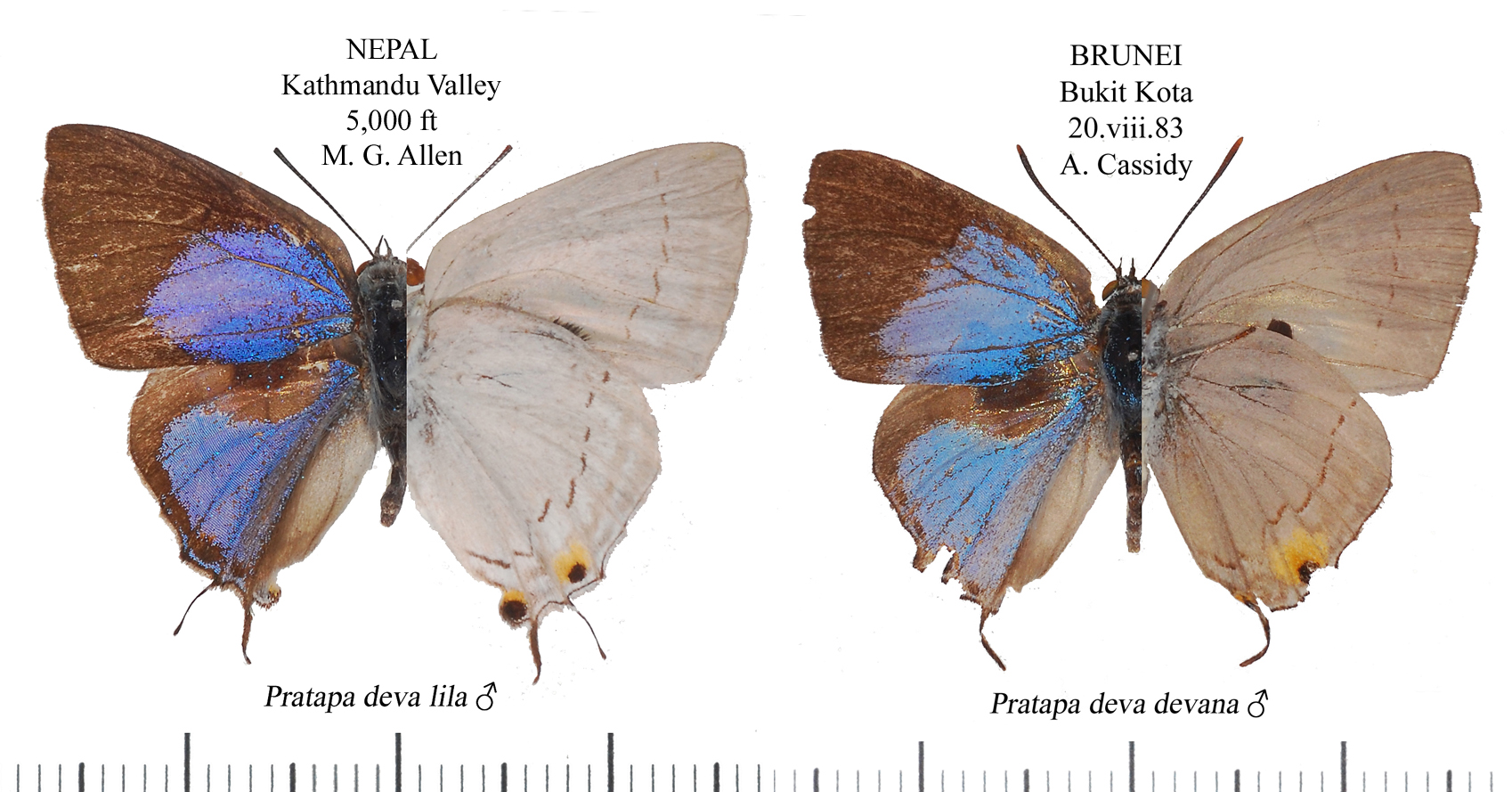

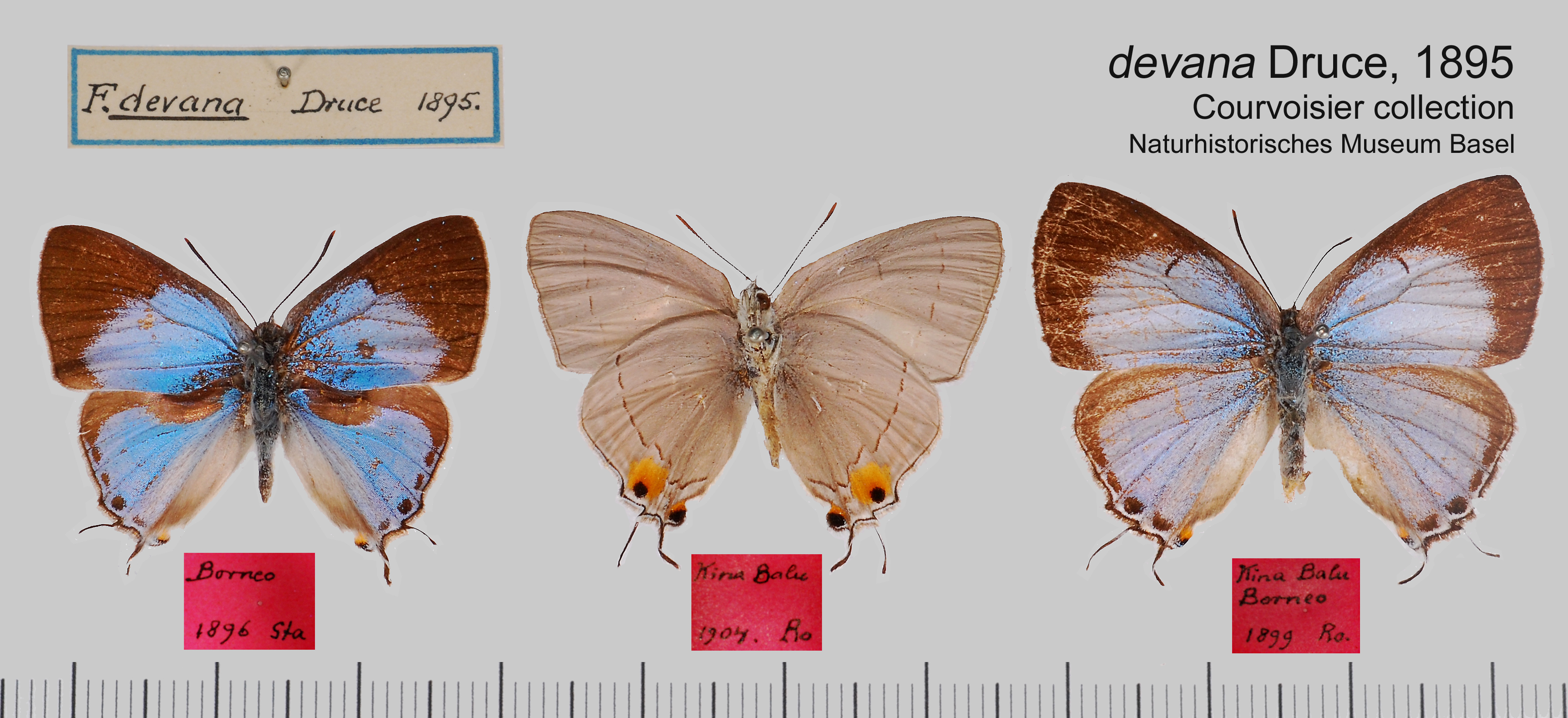

Scientific classification
- Kingdom: Animalia
- Phylum: Arthropoda
- Class: Insecta
- Order: Lepidoptera
- Family: Lycaenidae
- Genus: Pratapa
- Species: P. deva

Binomial name
- Pratapa deva (Moore, 1857)

Synonyms
- Amblypodia deva Moore, [1858]

= Pratapa deva =

White royal

Species of butterfly

Pratapa deva, the white royal, is a lycaenid or blue butterfly found in the Indomalayan realm. The species was first described by Frederic Moore in 1857.

== Description ==
Male. Upperside blue, with a mauve tint. Forewing with the median, the basal part of vein 3 and the sub-medians black, the apical black baud very broad, occupying more than a third of the wing, its inner margin rounded, narrowing gradually on the outer margin, the band near the hinder angle being fairly broad, on the costa it rapidly narrows, the basal third quite narrow. Hindwing with the costa broadly black, bulging hindwards below the glandular patch of scales; a narrow outer marginal black band; some blackish suffusion along the abdominal area, the fold grey; the marginal band ending in black spots in the three anal interspaces; tails black, tipped with white. Cilia black, with pale tips. Underside cream colour; a series of very thin discal, disconnected, brown linear marks across both wings, generally obsolescent on the forewing, curving round to the abdominal margin a little above the anal angle on the hindwing, the tuft of hairs attached to that portion of the inner margin of the forewing which is strongly bowed outwardly, is black, and very long and thick. Hindwing with a black anal spot, another in the first interspace, both capped with very pale orange; a sub-marginal series of pale grey lunules, and indications of another series close to the margin. Antennae black, ringed with white, club with a red tip; frons white, with two brown lines in it; head and body above and below eoncolorous with the wings. Female. Upperside paler and duller in colour than the male, the marginal black bands similar, without the bulge on the costal band of the hindwing, there being of course no sex mark, the outer portion of the blue area on the forewing often very much paler than the rest of the wing, all the veins on both wings fairly black. Underside as in the male, the discal and sub-marginal bands more prominent.

— Charles Swinhoe, Lepidoptera Indica. Vol. IX

== Subspecies ==
There are nine subspecies:

- P. d. deva – southern India, Sri Lanka
- P. d. relata (Distant, 1884) – Peninsular Malaya, Singapore
- P. d. lila Moore, [1884] – northern India, Assam, Myanmar, Thailand
- P. d. devana H. H. Druce, 1895 – northern Borneo
- P. d. devadatta (Fruhstorfer, 1912) – southern Borneo
- P. d. cartena (Fruhstorfer, 1912) – western Java
- P. d. methara (Fruhstorfer, 1912) – eastern Java
- P. d. devula Corbet, 1942 – Hong Kong
- P. d. christina Schröder & Treadaway, 1998 – Philippines: Luzon
