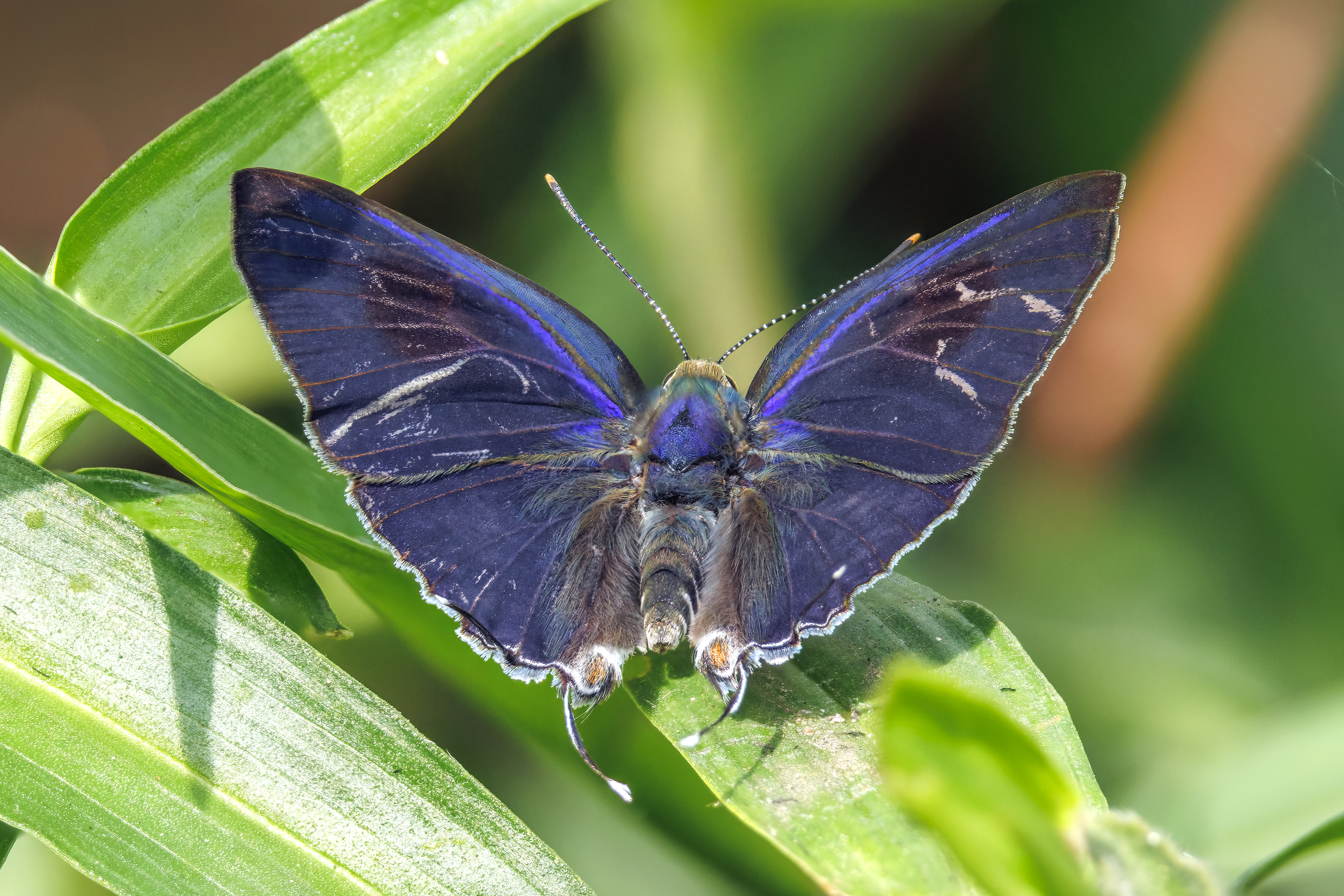

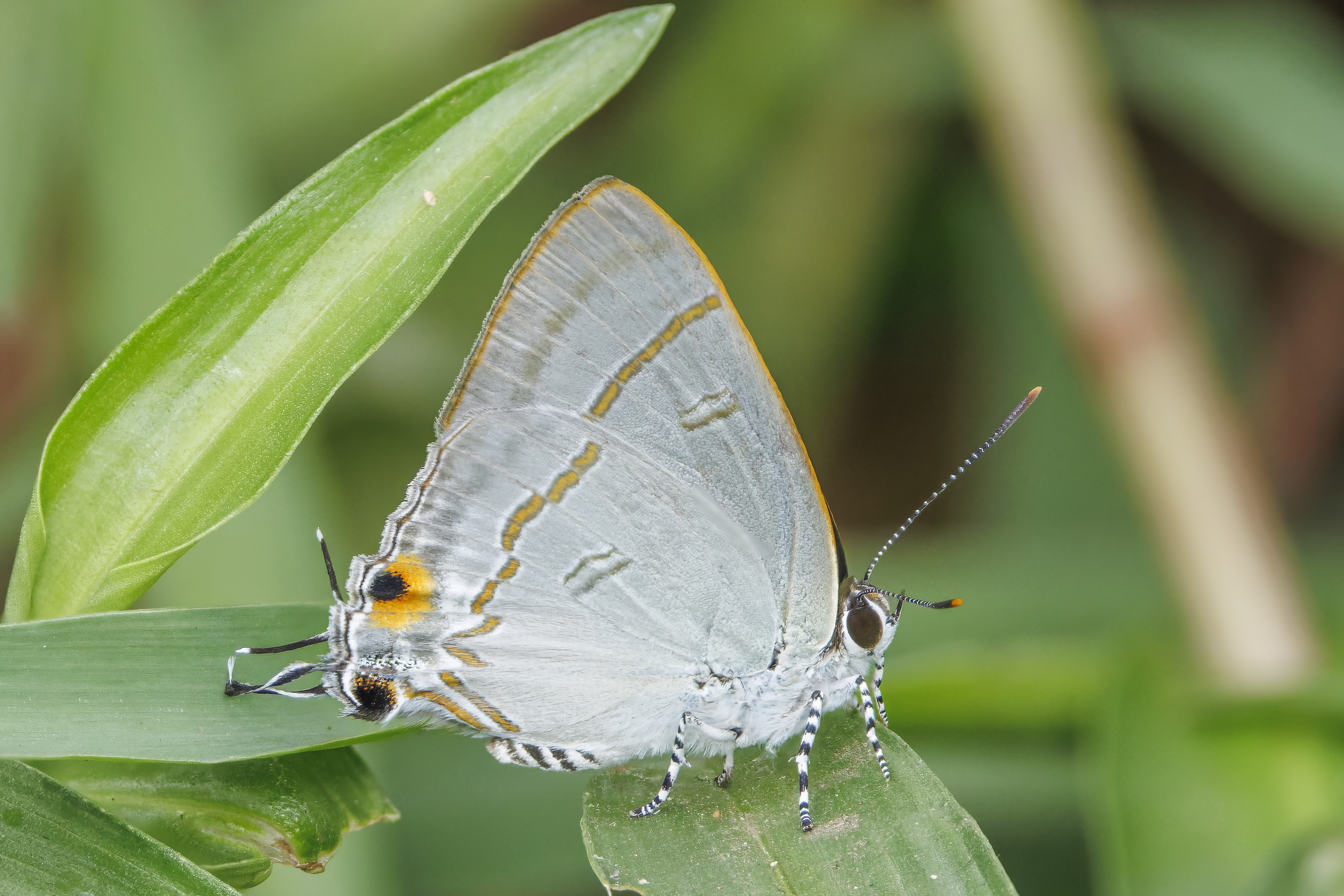
- both males H. e. himavantus, Cambodia

Scientific classification
- Kingdom: Animalia
- Phylum: Arthropoda
- Clade: Pancrustacea
- Class: Insecta
- Order: Lepidoptera
- Family: Lycaenidae
- Genus: Hypolycaena
- Species: H. erylus

Binomial name
- Hypolycaena erylus (Godart, 1823)

Subspecies
- Many, see text

Synonyms
- Polyommatus erylus Godart, [1824]; Hypolycaena teatus Fruhstorfer, 1912

= Hypolycaena erylus =

Common tit

Species of butterfly

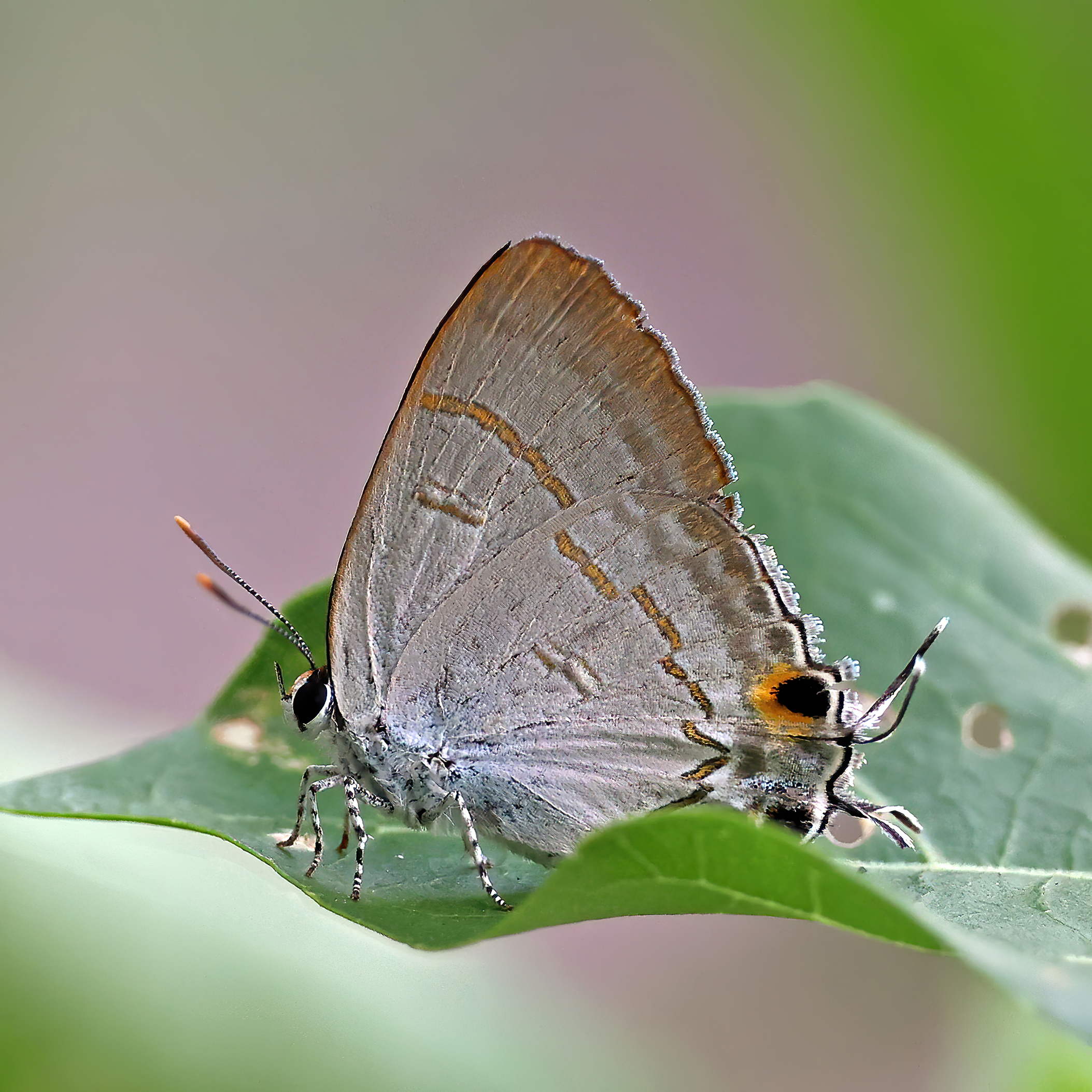
H. e. teatus, Thailand

Hypolycaena erylus, the common tit, is a small but striking butterfly found in India and South-East Asia that belongs to the lycaenids or blues family. The species was first described by Jean-Baptiste Godart in 1823.

== Range ==
Bangladesh, Nepal, Sikkim, Myanmar, Cambodia, Thailand, Laos, Vietnam, southern Yunnan, Java, Lombok, Peninsular Malaysia, Sumatra, Borneo, Andamans, Nias, Sulawesi, Philippines, Sula, Bachan, Halmahera, Obi, Bismarck Archipelago and Waigeu.

== Status ==
Common. Not rare as per Haribal.

== Description ==
The underside of both sexes is pale greyish brown. The underside hindwing does not have a spot in the basal area of 7. The butterfly has two tails – a 6 mm long one at V1 and a 5 mm long tail at V2. The markings include:

- a double bar at end-cell
- a regular discal line on the forewing
- a broken, less regular line on the hindwing

The male butterfly is pale blue to dark brown above, dark shining purple depending on the light. It has a black border with the upper forewing having a large black discal area of modified scales.

The female butterfly is dark brown and its hindwing has a white disconnected discal band above the tornus. The butterfly also has a white-edged tornal black spot in 2.

== Subspecies ==
The butterfly has a number of subspecies of which one, H. e. himavantus (Fruhstorfer), is found in mainland India while another H. e. andamana Moore is found in the Andamans. All subspecies are:

- H. e. erylus (Java)
- H. e. pupienus Fruhstorfer, 1912 (Lombok)
- H. e. teatus Fruhstorfer, 1912 (southern Thailand, Peninsular Malaya, Sumatra, Borneo)
- H. e. himavantus Fruhstorfer, 1912 (Nepal, Sikkim to Myanmar, Thailand, Laos, Vietnam, southern Yunnan)
- H. e. andamana Moore, 1877 (Andamans)
- H. e. syphax Fruhstorfer, 1912 (Nias)
- H. e. gamatius Fruhstorfer, 1912 (Sulawesi) (= H. e. pigres Fruhstorfer, 1912 (Obi))
- H. e. tmolus C. Felder & R. Felder, 1862 (Philippines)
- H. e. orsiphantus Fruhstorfer, 1912 (Philippines: Basilan)
- H. e. aimnestus Fruhstorfer, 1912 (Palawan)
- H. e. georgius Fruhstorfer, 1912 (Sula)
- H. e. thyrius Fruhstorfer, 1912 (Bachan, Halmahera)
- H. e. moutoni Ribbe
- H. e. figulus Fruhstorfer, 1912 (Waigeu)
- H. e. erna Kalis, 1933 (Bismarck Archipelago)

== Habits ==
The butterfly is abundant at low elevations. Males are known to cluster at damp patches while the females are rarely seen.

== Food plants ==
Recorded on Meyna pubescens in India.

== Gallery ==
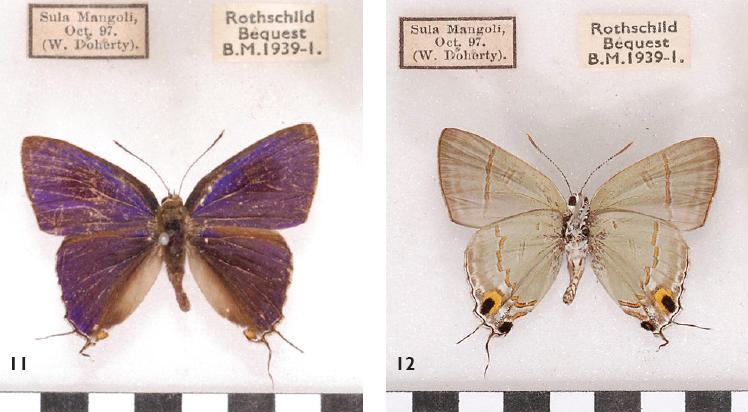
H. e. gamatius male

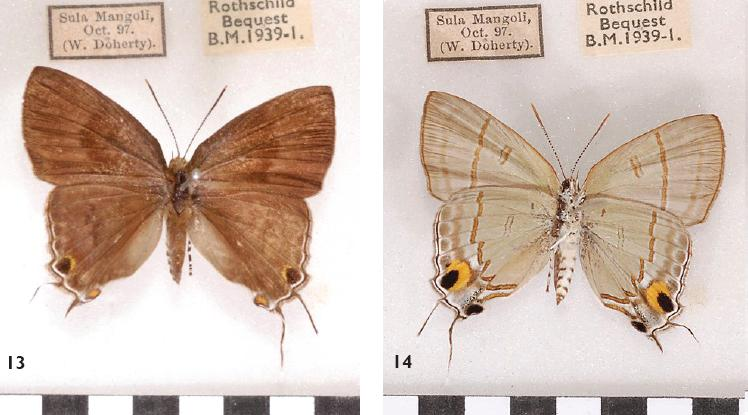
H. e. gamatius female

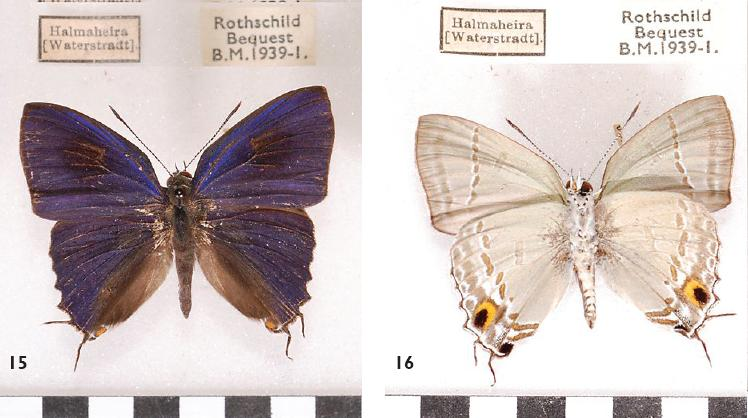
H. e. thyrius male

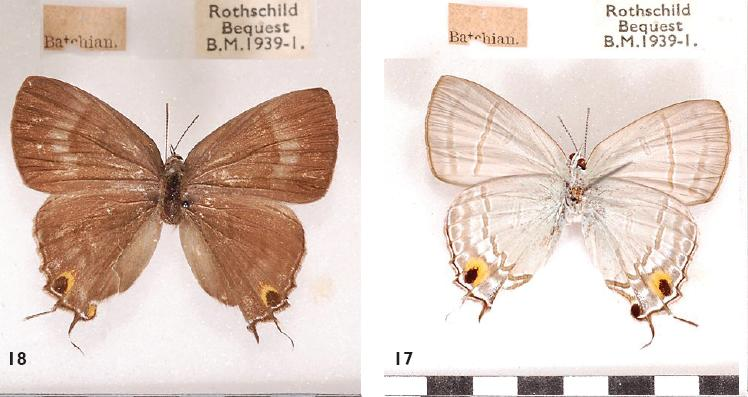
H. e. thyrius female

== See also ==
- List of butterflies of India
- List of butterflies of India (Lycaenidae)
