= List of butterflies of Tamil Nadu =

This is a list of butterfly species found in the Indian state of Tamil Nadu. In this state 329 species of butterflies are expected to be found.

- Papilionidae—swallowtail butterflies (19 species)
- Pieridae—yellow-white butterflies (32 species)
- Nymphalidae—brush-footed butterflies (97 species)
- Lycaenidae—blues butterflies (96 species)
- Riodinidae—Judies butterflies (2 species)
- Hesperiidae—skipper butterflies (83 species)

== Family Papilionidae ==
There are 19 species recorded.

=== Subfamily Papilioninae ===
==== Genus Graphium (Pathysa)—swordtails, zebras ====
- Spot swordtail, Pathysa nomius (Esper, 1798)
- Fivebar swordtail, Pathysa antiphates (Cramer, 1775)

==== Genus Graphium (Graphium)—bluebottles and jays ====
- Common jay, Graphium doson (C. & R. Felder, 1864)
- Tailed jay, Graphium agamemnon (Linnaeus, 1758)
- Southern/ Narrow-banded bluebottle, Graphium teredon (Felder & Felder, 1864)

==== Genus Atrophaneura (Pachliopta)—roses ====
- Common rose, Pachliopta aristolochiae (Fabricius, 1775)
- Crimson rose, Pachliopta hector (Linnaeus, 1758)
- Malabar rose, Pachliopta pandiyana (Moore, 1881)

==== Genus Troides—birdwings ====
- Southern birdwing, Troides minos (Cramer, 1779)

==== Genus Papilio (Chilasa)—mimes ====
- Common mime, Papilio (Chilasa) clytia, Linnaeus, 1758

==== Genus Papilio (Papilio)—swallowtails ====
- Malabar banded swallowtail, Papilio liomedon (Moore, 1874)
- Blue Mormon, Papilio polymnestor (Cramer, 1775)
- Red Helen, Papilio helenus (Linnaeus, 1758)
- Common Mormon, Papilio polytes (Linnaeus, 1758)
- Malabar raven, Papilio dravidarum (Wood-Mason, 1880)
- Lime butterfly, Papilio demoleus (Linnaeus, 1758)
- Common banded peacock, Papilio crino (Fabricius, 1792)
- Malabar banded peacock, Papilio buddha (Westwood, 1872)
- Paris peacock, Papilio paris (Linnaeus, 1758)

== Family Pieridae ==
There are 32 species recorded.

=== Subfamily Pierinae—whites ===
==== Genus Pieris—whites ====
- Indian cabbage white, Pieris canidia Linnaeus, 1768

==== Genus Anaphaeis—pioneers ====
- Pioneer (caper white), Anaphaeis aurota Fabricius, 1793

==== Genus Cepora—gulls ====
- Common gull, Cepora nerissa Fabricius, 1775
- Lesser gull, Cepora nadina Lucas, 1852

==== Genus Ixias—Indian orange tips ====
- White orange tip, Ixias marianne Cramer, 1779
- Yellow orange tip, Ixias pyrene Linnaeus, 1764

==== Genus Delias—Jezebels ====
- Common Jezebel, Delias eucharis Drury, 1773

==== Genus Prioneris—sawtooths ====
- Painted sawtooth, Prioneris sita C. Felder, 1865

==== Genus Appias—puffins and albatrosses ====
- Spot puffin, Appias lalage (Doubleday, 1842)
- Plain puffin, Appias indra Moore, 1857
- Striped albatross, Appias libythea Fabricius, 1775
- Chocolate albatross, Appias lyncida Cramer, 1777
- Common albatross, Appias albina Felder
- Lesser albatross, Appias wardii (Moore, 1884)

==== Genus Leptosia—Psyche ====
- Psyche, Leptosia nina Fabricius, 1793

==== Genus Hebomoia—great orange tip ====
- Great orange-tip, Hebomoia glaucippe Linnaeus, 1758

==== Genus Colotis—Arabs ====
- Small salmon Arab, Colotis amata Fabricius, 1775
- Large salmon Arab, Colotis fausta (Olivier, 1804)
- Small orange-tip, Colotis etrida Boisduval, 1836
- Plain orange-tip, Colotis aurora (Cramer, 1780)
- Crimson-tip, Colotis danae (Fabricius, 1775)

==== Genus Pareronia—wanderers ====
- Dark wanderer, Pareronia ceylanica (C. & R. Felder, 1865)
- Common wanderer, Pareronia valeria (Cramer, 1776)

=== Subfamily Coliadinae—yellows ===
==== Genus Catopsilia—emigrants ====
- Common emigrant, Catopsilia pomona Fabricius, 1775
- Mottled emigrant, Catopsilia pyranthe Latreille, 1758

==== Genus Eurema—grass yellows ====
- Small grass yellow, Eurema brigitta Cramer, 1780
- Spotless grass yellow, Eurema laeta Boisduval, 1836
- One-spot grass yellow, Eurema andersonii Moore
- Common grass yellow, Eurema hecabe Linnaeus, 1758
- Three-spot grass yellow, Eurema blanda Boisduval, 1836
- Nilgiri grass yellow, Eurema nilgiriensis

==== Genus Colias—clouded yellows ====
- Nilgiri clouded yellow, Colias nilgiriensis

== Family Nymphalidae ==
=== Subfamily Libytheinae ===
==== Genus Libythea—beaks ====
- Lobed beak, Libythea laius lepitoides (Moore, 1903)
- Club beak, Libythea myrrha, (Godart, 1819)

=== Subfamily Danainae ===
==== Genus Parantica—glassy tigers ====
- Glassy tiger, Parantica aglea (Stoll, 1782)
- Nilgiri tiger, Parantica nilgiriensis (Moore, 1877)

==== Genus Tirumala—blue tigers ====
- Dark blue tiger, Tirumala septentrionis (Butler, 1874)
- Blue tiger, Tirumala limniace Cramer, 1775

==== Genus Danaus—tigers ====
- Plain tiger, Danaus chrysippus Linnaeus, 1758
- Common or striped tiger, Danaus genutia Cramer, 1779

==== Genus Euploea—crows ====
- Common Indian crow, Euploea core (Cramer, 1780)
- Double-branded crow, Euploea sylvester (Fabricius, 1793)
- Blue king crow, Euploea klugii Moore, 1858

==== Genus Idea—tree nymphs ====
- Malabar tree nymph, Idea malabarica Moore, 1877

=== Subfamily Charaxinae ===
==== Genus Charaxes—rajahs ====
- Tawny rajah, Charaxes bernardus (Fabricius, 1793)
- Black rajah, Charaxes solon (Fabricius, 1793)

==== Genus Polyura—nawabs ====
- Blue nawab, Polyura schreiberi (Godart, 1819)
- Common nawab, Polyura athamas (Drury, 1773)
- Anomalous nawab, Polyura agraria

=== Subfamily Morphinae ===
==== Genus Discophora—duffers ====
- Southern duffer, Discophora lepida (Moore, 1857)

=== Subfamily Satyrinae ===
==== Genus Mycalesis—bushbrowns ====
- Whitebar bushbrown, Mycalesis anaxias Hewitson, 1862
- Small longbrand bushbrown, Mycalesis igilia Fruhstorfer, 1909
- Long-brand bushbrown, Mycalesis visala Moore, 1858
- Palebrand bushbrown, Mycalesis khasia Evans, 1920
- Redeye bushbrown, Mycalesis adolphei (Guérin-Ménéville, 1843)
- Palni bushbrown, Mycalesis mamerata davisoni
- Red-disc bushbrown, Mycalesis oculus Marshall, 1880
- Gladeye bushbrown, Mycalesis patnia Moore, 1857
- Tamil bushbrown, Mycalesis subdita Moore
- Common bushbrown, Mycalesis perseus (Fabricius, 1775)
- Dark branded bushbrown, Mycalesis mineus (Linnaeus, 1758)

==== Genus Lethe—treebrowns ====
- Common treebrown, Lethe rohria (Fabricius, 1787)
- Tamil treebrown, Lethe drypetis (Hewitson, ?1868)
- Bamboo treebrown, Lethe europa (Fabricius, 1775)

==== Genus Ypthima—rings ====
- Common threering, Ypthima asterope
- Jewel fourring, Ypthima avanta Moore, 1875
- Common fivering, Ypthima baldus (Fabricius, 1775)
- White fourring, Ypthima ceylonica Hewitson, 1865
- Nilgiri fourring, Ypthima chenui (Guérin-Méneville, 1843)
- Common fourring, Ypthima huebneri Kirby, 1871
- Baby fivering, Ypthima philomela (Linnaeus, 1763)
- Palni fourring, Ypthima ypthimoides Moore, 1881

==== Genus Zipaetis—catseyes ====
- Tamil catseye, Zipaetis saitis Hewitson, 1863

==== Genus Orsotriaena—nigger ====
- Nigger, Orsotriaena medus (Fabricius, 1775)

==== Genus Melanitis—evening browns ====
- Common evening brown, Melanitis leda (Linnaeus, 1758)
- Dark evening brown, Melanitis phedima (Cramer, 1780)
- Great evening brown, Melanitis zitenius (Herbst, 1796)

==== Genus Elymnias—palmflies ====
- Common palmfly, Elymnias hypermnestra (Linnaeus, 1763)
- Tailed palmfly, Elymnias hypermnestra (Butler, 1871)

=== Subfamily Heliconiinae ===
==== Genus Vindula—cruiser ====
- Cruiser, Vindula erota Fabricius, 1793

==== Genus Cirrochroa—yeomen ====
- Tamil yeoman, Cirrochroa thais (Fabricius, 1787)

==== Genus Cupha—rustic ====
- Rustic, Cupha erymanthis (Drury, 1773)

==== Genus Phalanta—leopards ====
- Small leopard, Phalanta alcippe Stoll, 1782
- Leopard, Phalanta phalantha Drury, 1773

==== Genus Argynnis—fritillaries ====
- Indian fritillary, Argynnis hyperbius Linnaeus, 1763

==== Genus Cethosia—lacewings ====
- Tamil lacewing, Cethosia nietneri Felder & Felder, 1867

=== Subfamily Acraeinae ===
==== Genus Acraea—tawny coster ====
- Tawny coster, Acraea terpsicore (Linnaeus, 1758)

=== Subfamily Limenitidinae ===
==== Genus Limenitis—admirals ====
- Commander, Limenitis procris (Cramer, 1777)

==== Genus Athyma—sergeants ====
- Common sergeant, Athyma perius (Linnaeus, 1758)
- Blackvein sergeant, Athyma ranga Moore, 1857
- Staff sergeant, Athyma selenophora (Kollar, 1844)
- Colour sergeant, Athyma nefte (Cramer, 1780)

==== Genus Pantoporia—lascars ====
- Common lascar, Pantoporia hordonia (Stoll, 1790)
- Extra lascar, Pantoporia sandaka (Butler, 1892)

==== Genus Neptis—sailers ====
- Common sailer, Neptis hylas Linnaeus, 1758
- Shortbanded sailer, Neptis columella
- Chestnut-streaked sailer, Neptis jumbah Moore, 1857
- Yellowback sailer, Neptis viraja
- Sullied sailer, Neptis soma
- Clear sailer, Neptis nata
- Southern sullied sailer, Neptis clinia

==== Genus Parthenos—clipper ====
- Clipper, Parthenos sylvia (Cramer, 1775)

==== Genus Euthalia—barons ====
- Common baron, Euthalia aconthea (Cramer, 1777)
- Gaudy baron, Euthalia lubentina (Cramer, 1777)
- Baronet, Euthalia nais (Forster, 1771)
- Blue baron, Euthalia telchinia (Ménétriés, 1857)

==== Genus Tanaecia—counts ====
- Grey count, Tanaecia lepidea (Butler, 1868)

==== Genus Dophla—dukes ====
- Redspot duke, Dophla evelina (Stoll, 1790)

=== Subfamily Cyrestinae ===
==== Genus Cyrestis—map butterflies ====
- Common map, Cyrestis thyodamas Boisduval, 1836

=== Subfamily Biblidinae ===
==== Genus Ariadne—castors ====
- Angled castor, Ariadne ariadne Linnaeus, 1763
- Common castor, Ariadne merione

==== Genus Byblia—joker ====
- Joker, Byblia ilithyia (Drury, 1773)

=== Subfamily Apaturinae ===
==== Genus Rohana ====
- Black prince, Rohana parisatis (Westwood, 1850)

==== Genus Euripus—courtesans ====
- Painted courtesan, Euripus consimilis (Westwood, 1850)

=== Subfamily Nymphalinae ===
==== Genus Vanessa—admirals, painted lady ====
- Indian red admiral, Vanessa indica (Herbst, 1794)
- Painted lady, Vanessa cardui

==== Genus Kaniska ====
- Blue admiral, Kaniska canace (Linnaeus, 1763)

==== Genus Junonia—pansies ====
- Gray pansy, Junonia atlites (Linnaeus, 1763)
- Peacock pansy, Junonia (Precis) almana (Linnaeus, 1758)
- Yellow pansy, Junonia (Precis) hierta (Fabricius, 1798)
- Chocolate pansy, Junonia (Precis) iphita (Cramer, 1779)
- Lemon pansy, Junonia (Precis) lemonias (Linnaeus, 1758)
- Blue pansy, Junonia orithya (Linnaeus, 1758)

==== Genus Hypolimnas—eggflies ====
- Great eggfly, Hypolimnas bolina (Linnaeus, 1758)
- Danaid eggfly, Hypolimnas misippus (Linnaeus, 1764)

==== Genus Kallima—oakleafs ====
- South Indian blue oakleaf, Kallima horsfieldii Kollar, 1844

==== Genus Doleschallia—autumn leaf ====
- Autumn leaf, Doleschallia bisaltide malabarica (Cramer, 1777)

== Family Riodinidae ==
=== Subfamily Nemeobiinae ===
==== Genus Abisara—Judies ====
- Plum Judy, Abisara echerius (Moore, 1901)

== Family Lycaenidae ==
=== Subfamily Curetinae ===
==== Genus Curetis—sunbeams ====
- Indian sunbeam, Curetis thetis (Drury, 1773) (L40.1)
- Shiva's sunbeam, Curetis siva Evans, 1954
- Toothed sunbeam, Curetis dentata Moore, 1879

=== Subfamily Miletinae ===
==== Genus Spalgis—apefly ====
- Apefly, Spalgis epius (Westwood, 1851) (L6.1)

=== Subfamily Polyommatinae ===
==== Genus Talicada—red Pierrot ====
- Red Pierrot, Talicada nyseus Guérin, 1843. (L8.1)

==== Genus Castalius—common Pierrot ====
- Common Pierrot, Castalius rosimon Fabricius, 1775. (L9.1)
- Dark Pierrot, Castalius ananda de Nicéville, 1884 previously Tarucus ananda de Nicéville (L10.1)

==== Genus Caleta—angled Pierrot ====
- Angled Pierrot, Caleta caleta Hewitson, 1876 earlier Castalius caleta Moore (L9.2)

==== Genus Discolampa—banded blue Pierrot ====
- Banded blue Pierrot, Discolampa ethion Westwood, 1851 earlier Castalius ethion Doubleday & Hewitson (L9.3)

==== Genus Tarucus—blue Pierrots ====
- Spotted Pierrot, Tarucus callinara Butler, 1886 (L10.4)
- Striped Pierrot, Tarucus nara Kollar, 1848 (L10.9)
- Indian Pierrot, Tarucus indica Evans, 1932

==== Genus Syntarucus—zebra blue ====
- Zebra blue, Syntarucus plinius (Fabricius, 1793) (L11.1) (synonyms Leptotus plinius, Tarucus plinius)

==== Genus Azanus—babul blues ====
- Bright babul blue, Azanus ubaldus Cramer, 1782 (L12.1)
- Dull babul blue, Azanus uranus Butler, 1886 (L12.2)
- African babul blue, Azanus jesous Guérin-Meneville, 1847 (L12.4)

==== Genus Neopithecops—Quaker ====
- Quaker, Neopithecops zalmora Butler 1870 (L15.1)

==== Genus Megisba—Malayan ====
- Malayan, Megisba malaya (Horsfield, 1828) (H20.1, p. 220)

==== Genus Celastrina—hedge blues ====
- Plain hedge blue, Celastrina lavendularis (Moore, 1877) previously Lycaenopsis lavendularis Moore (L19.15)

==== Genus Acytolepis—hedge blues ====
- Common hedge blue, Acytolepis puspa (Horsfield, 1828) previously Lycaenopsis puspa (Toxopeus) (L19.1)
- Hampson's hedge blue, Acytolepis lilacea (Hampson, 1889) Lycaenopsis lilacea Hampson (L19.2)

==== Genus Akasinula—white hedge blue ====
- White hedge blue, Akasinula akasa (Horsfield, 1828) previously Lycaenopsis akasa Frühstorfer (L19.10)

==== Genus Cyaniris—hedge blues ====
- Whitedisc hedge blue, Cyaniris albidisca Moore, 1883 previously Lycaenopsis albidisca Moore (L19.6)

==== Genus Polyommatus—meadow blues ====
- Singhalese hedge blue, Polyommatus singalensis Moore, 1877 previously Lycaenopsis singalensis Felder (L19.13)

==== Genus Chilades—lime blue ====
- Lime blue, Chilades lajus (Stoll, [1780]) (L21.1)
- Indian Cupid, Chilades parrhasius (Fabricius, 1793) previously Everes parrhasius Fabricius (L16.4)

==== Genus Luthrodes—Cupids ====
- Small Cupid, Luthrodes contracta (Butler, 1880) previously Euchrysops contracta Butler (L23.2)?
- Plains Cupid, Luthrodes pandava (Horsfield, 1829) previously Euchrysops pandava Horsfield (L23.3)

==== Genus Zizeeria—grass blues ====
- Dark grass blue, Zizeeria lysimon (Hübner, 1798–1803) (L22.3)
- Lesser grass blue, Zizeeria otis (Fabricius, 1787) (L22.5)

==== Genus Pseudozizeeria—pale grass blue ====
- Pale grass blue, Pseudozizeeria maha (Kollar, 1848) previously Zizeeria maha Kollar (L22.2)

==== Genus Zizula—tiny grass blue ====
- Tiny grass blue, Zizula gaika (Trimen, 1862) synonym Zizula hylax (Fabricius 1775) (now suppressed) (L22.4)

==== Genus Freyeria—grass jewel ====
- Grass jewel, Freyeria trochylus (Freyer, 1845) previously Zizeeria trochilus Freyer (L22.1)

==== Genus Euchrysops—gram blues ====
- Gram blue, Euchrysops cnejus (Fabricius, 1798) (L23.1)

==== Genus Anthene—ciliate blues ====
- Ciliate blue, Anthene emolus (Godart, 1823) previously Lycaenesthes emolus Godart (L24.1)
- Pointed ciliate blue, Anthene lycaenina (C. Felder, 1868) previously Lycaenesthes lycaenina Felder (L24.2)

==== Genus Catochrysops—forget-me-nots ====
- Forget-me-not, Catochrysops strabo (Fabricius, 1793) (L25.1)
- Silver forget-me-not, Catochrysops panormus (C. Felder, 1860)

==== Genus Lampides—ceruleans and the peablue ====
- Peablue, Lampides boeticus (Linnaeus, 1767) (L26.1)

==== Genus Jamides—ceruleans ====
- Dark cerulean, Jamides bochus Stoll, 1782 (L27.1)
- Common cerulean, Jamides celeno (Cramer, 1775) (L27.3)
- Metallic cerulean, Jamides alecto (Felder, 1860) (L27.7)

==== Genus Nacaduba—lineblues ====
- Large four-line blue, Nacaduba pactolus (Felder, 1860) (L30.2)
- Pale four-line blue, Nacaduba hermus (Felder, 1860) (L30.3)
- Pointed lineblue, Nacaduba helicon Felder,? (L30.7)
- Transparent six-line blue, Nacaduba kurava (Moore, 1857) (L30.8)
- Opaque six-line blue, Nacaduba beroe (Felder & Felder, 1865) (L30.9)
- Rounded six-line blue, Nacaduba berenice (Herrich-Schäffer, 1869) (L30.10)
- Dark Ceylon six-line blue, Nacaduba calauria (C. Felder, 1860)

==== Genus Prosotas—lineblues ====
- Common lineblue, Prosotas nora (Felder, 1860) previously Nacaduba nora Felder (L30.13)
- Tailless lineblue, Prosotas dubiosa (Semper, 1879) previously Nacaduba dubiosa Evans (L30.14)
- White-tipped lineblue, Prosotas noreia (Felder, 1868) previously Nacaduba noreia Felder (L30.15)

==== Genus Petrelea—dingy lineblue ====
- Dingy lineblue, Petrelea dana (de Nicéville, 1884) previously Nacaduba dana de Nicéville (L30.16)

=== Subfamily Theclinae ===
==== Genus Iraota—silverstreak blues ====
- Silverstreak blue, Iraota timoleon Stoll, 1790 (L41.1)

==== Genus Horsfieldia—leaf blue ====
- Leaf blue, Horsfieldia anita Moore

==== Genus Thaduka—many-tailed oak-blue ====
- Many-tailed oak-blue, Thaduka multicaudata Moore, 1878 (L43.1)

==== Genus Arhopala—oakblues ====
- Large oakblue, Arhopala amantes (Hewitson, 1862) previously Amblypodia amantes Hewitson (L45.18)
- Aberrant bushblue, Arhopala abseus (Hewitson, 1862) previously Amblypodia abseus (L45.39)
- Dark broken-band oakblue, Arhopala atrax (Hewitson, 1862)

==== Genus Nilasera—oakblues ====
- Centaur oakblue, Nilasera centaurus (Fabricius, 1775) previously Amblypodia centaurus Moore (L45.16)

==== Genus Panchala—oakblues ====
- Rosy oakblue, Panchala alea (Hewitson, 1862) previously Amblypodia alea Hewitson (L45.11)

==== Genus Narathura—Tamil oakblue ====
- Tamil oakblue, Narathura bazaloides (Hewitson, 1878) previously Amblypodia bazaloides Hewitson (L45.23)

==== Genus Surendra—acacia blue ====
- Common acacia blue, Surendra quercetorum (Moore, 1857) (L46.1)

==== Genus Zinaspa—silver streaked acacia blue ====
- Silver streaked acacia blue, Zinaspa todara (Moore, 1883) previously Surendra todara Moore (L46.2)

==== Genus Loxura—yamfly ====
- Yamfly, Loxura atymnus (Cramer, 1782) (L48.1)

==== Genus Zesius—redspot ====
- Redspot, Zesius chrysomallus Hübner, 1819/21 (L53.1)

==== Genus Pratapa—tufted royals ====
- White royal, Pratapa deva (Moore, 1857) (L54.5)

==== Genus Ancema—royals ====
- Silver royal, Ancema blanka (de Nicéville, 1895) previously Pratapa blanka Evans (L54.4)

==== Genus Creon—broadtail royal ====
- Broadtail royal, Creon cleobis (Godart, 1823) previously Pratapa cleobis Godart (L54.8)

==== Genus Tajuria—royals ====
- Plains blue royal, Tajuria jehana Moore, 1883 (L55.12)
- Peacock royal, Tajuria cippus (Fabricius, 1798) (L55.13)
- Spotted royal, Tajuria maculata Hewitson, ? (L55.17)

==== Genus Ops—branded royal ====
- Branded royal, Ops melastigma (de Nicéville, 1887) previously Tajuria melastigma de Nicéville (L55.4)

==== Genus Charana—mandarin blues ====
- Banded royal, Charana jalindra Moore (L56.1)

==== Genus Cheritra—common imperial ====
- Common imperial, Cheritra freja (Fabricius, 1793) (L60.1)

==== Genus Rathinda—monkeypuzzle ====
- Monkeypuzzle, Rathinda amor (Fabricius, 1775) (L63.1)

==== Genus Horaga—onyxs ====
- Common onyx, Horaga onyx (Moore, 1857) (L64.1)
- Brown onyx, Horaga viola Moore, 1882 (L64.4)

==== Genus Catapaecilma—common tinsel ====
- Common tinsel, Catapaecilma elegans Druce, 1873 (L64.1)

==== Genus Chliaria—tits ====
- Orchid tit, Chliaria othona (Hewitson, 1865) (L66.1)
- Nilgiri tit, Chliaria nilgirica (Moore, 1883) previously Hypolycaena nilgirica Moore (L67.1)

==== Genus Zeltus—fluffy tit ====
- Fluffy tit, Zeltus etolus (Fabricius, 1787) (L68.1)

==== Genus Deudorix—cornelians ====
- Cornelian, Deudorix epijarbas (Moore, 1857) (L70.1)

==== Genus Virachola—guava blues ====
- Common guava blue, Virachola isocrates (Fabricius, 1793) (L71.1)
- Large guava blue, Virachola perse (Hewitson, 1863) (L71.2)

==== Genus Rapala—flashes ====
- Indigo flash, Rapala varuna (Hewitson, 1863) (L72.7)
- Slate flash, Rapala schistacea (Moore, 1879) (L72.8)
- Common red flash, Rapala iarbus (Fabricius, 1787) previously Rapala jarbas Fabricius (L72.13)

==== Genus Vadebra—Malabar flash ====
- Malabar flash, Vadebra lankana (Moore, 1879) previously Rapala lankana Moore (L72.3)

==== Genus Bindahara—plane ====
- Plane, Bindahara phocides (Fabricius, 1793) (L74.1)

=== Subfamily Aphnaeinae ===
==== Genus Cigaritis—silverlines ====
- Common silverline, Cigaritis vulcanus (Fabricius, 1775) (L52.1)
- Long-banded silverline, Cigaritis lohita (Horsfield, [1829]) (L52.11)
- Plumbeous silverline, Cigaritis schistacea (Moore, [1881]) (L52.2)
- Abnormal silverline, Cigaritis abnormis (Moore, [1884]) (L52.4)
- Common shot silverline, Cigaritis ictis (Hewitson, [1865]) (L52.5)
- Scarce shot silverline, Cigaritis elima (Moore, 1877) (L52.6)
- Cloud forest silverline, Cigaritis meghamalaiensis Sadasivan & Naicker, 2023 (L52.7)

== Family Hesperiidae ==
=== Subfamily Coeliadinae ===
==== Genus Badamia—brown awl ====
- Brown awl, Badamia exclamationis (Fabricius, 1775)

==== Genus Bibasis—orange tailed awl ====
- Pale green awlet, Bibasis gomata (Moore, 1865)
- Orange-striped awl/orange awlet, Bibasis jaina (Moore, 1865)
- Orangetail awl/pale green awlet, Bibasis sena (Moore, 1865)

==== Genus Choaspes—awlkings ====
- Indian awlking, Choaspes benjaminii (Guérin-Meneville, 1843)

==== Genus Hasora—awls ====
- Common awl, Hasora badra (Moore, 1857)
- Common banded awl, Hasora chromus (Cramer, 1780)
- White banded awl, Hasora taminatus (Hübner, 1818)

=== Subfamily Hesperiinae ===
==== Genus Aeromachus—scrub hoppers ====
- Dingy scrub-hopper, Aeromachus dubius (Elwes & Edwards, 1897)
- Pygmy grass/scrub-hopper, Aeromachus pygmaeus (Fabricius, 1775)

==== Genus Ampittia—bush hoppers ====
- Bush hopper, Ampittia dioscorides (Fabricius, 1793)

==== Genus Arnetta—bobs ====
- Coorg forest hopper, Arnetta mercara (Evans, 1932)
- Vindhyan bob, Arnetta vindhiana (Moore, 1883)

==== Genus Baoris—swifts ====
- Paintbrush swift, Baoris farri (Moore, 1878)

==== Genus Baracus—hedge hoppers ====
- Hedge/Hampson's hedge-hopper, Baracus vittatus (Felder, 1862)

==== Genus Pseudoborbo—Bevan's swift ====
- Beavan's swift, Pseudoborbo bevani (Moore, 1878) ?

==== Genus Borbo—swifts ====
- Rice swift, Borbo cinnara (Wallace, 1866)

==== Genus Caltoris—swifts ====
- Kanara swift, Caltoris canaraica (Moore, 1883)
- Blank swift, Caltoris kumara (Moore, 1878)
- Philippine swift, Caltoris philippina (Herrich-Schäffer, 1869)

==== Genus Cupitha—wax dart ====
- Wax dart, Cupitha purreea (Moore, 1877)

==== Genus Gangara—giant redeye ====
- Giant redeye, Gangara thyrsis (Fabricius, 1775)

==== Genus Halpe—aces ====
- Indian/Ceylon ace, Halpe homolea (Hewitson, 1868)
- Moore's ace, Halpe porus (Mabille, 1876)
- Chestnut bob, Iambrix salsala (Moore, 1865)

==== Genus Matapa—branded redeye ====
- Common redeye, Matapa aria (Moore, 1865)

==== Genus Notocrypta—demons ====
- Restricted demon, Notocrypta curvifascia (Felder & Felder, 1862)
- Common banded demon, Notocrypta paralysos (Wood-Mason & de Nicéville, 1881)

==== Genus Parnara ====
- Variable swift, Parnara bada (Moore, 1878)
- Continental swift, Parnara ganga (Evans, 1937)

==== Genus Pelopidas—branded swifts ====
- Dark branded swift, Pelopidas agna (Moore, 1865)
- Conjoined swift, Pelopidas conjuncta (Herrich-Schäffer, 1869)
- Dark small-branded swift, Pelopidas mathias (Fabricius, 1798)
- Large branded swift, Pelopidas subochracea (Moore, 1878)

==== Genus Polytremis ====
- Contiguous swift, Polytremis lubricans (Herrich–Schäffer, 1869)

==== Genus Potanthus—darts ====
- Confucian/Chinese dart, Potanthus confucius (Felder & Felder, 1862)
- Pallied dart, Potanthus pallida (Evans, 1932)
- Palni dart, Potanthus palnia (Evans, 1914)
- Pava dart, Potanthus pava (Fruhstorfer, 1911)
- Pseudomaesa/common dart, Potanthus pseudomaesa (Moore, 1881)

==== Genus Psolos—coon ====
- Coon, Psolos fuligo (Mabille, 1876)

==== Genus Quedara ====
- Yellow–base/golden tree flitter, Quedara basiflava (de Nicéville, 1888)

==== Genus Sovia ====
- Bicolour ace, Sovia hyrtacus (de Nicéville, 1897)

==== Genus Suastus—palm bob ====
- Indian palm bob, Suastus gremius (fabricius, 1798)
- Small palm bob, Suastus minuta (Moore, 1877)

==== Genus Taractrocera—grass darts ====
- Tamil grass dart, Taractrocera ceramas (Hewitson, 1868)
- Common grass dart, Taractrocera maevius (Fabricius, 1793)

==== Genus Telicota—palm darts ====
- Dark palm dart, Telicota ancilla (Herrich–Schäffer, 1869)
- Pale palm dart, Telicota colon (Fabricius, 1775)

==== Genus Cephrenes ====
- Plain palm dart, Cephrenes chrysozona (Plötz, 1883)

==== Genus Thoressa—aces ====
- Southern spotted ace or unbranded ace, Thoressa astigmata (Swinhoe, 1890)
- Evershed's ace, Thoressa evershedi (Evans, 1910)
- Madras ace, Thoressa honorei (de Nicéville, 1887)
- Tamil ace or Sitala ace, Thoressa sitala (de Nicéville, 1885)

==== Genus Udaspes—grass demon ====
- Grass demon, Udaspes folus (Cramer, 1775)

==== Genus Hyarotis—flitters ====
- Tree flitter, Hyarotis adrastus (Stoll, 1782)
- Brush flitter, Hyarotis microstrictum (Wood–Mason & de Nicéville, 1887)

==== Genus Oriens—dartlets ====
- Tamil dartlet, Oriens concinna (Elwes & Edwards, 1897)
- Common dartlet, Oriens goloides (Moore, 1881)

=== Subfamily Pyrginae ===
==== Genus Caprona —angles ====
- Golden angle, Caprona ransonnetti (Felder, 1868)
- Spotted angle, Caprona agama (Moore, 1857 )
- Spotted angle, Caprona alida (de Nicéville, 1891)

==== Genus Celaenorrhinus—flat ====
- Malabar spotted flat, Celaenorrhinus ambareesa (Moore, 1865)
- Common spotted flat, Celaenorrhinus leucocera (Kollar, 1848)
- Tamil spotted flat, Celaenorrhinus ruficornis (Mabille, 1878)

==== Genus Cogia ====
- Tricolour flat, Cogia indrani (Moore, 1865)

==== Genus Coladenia—pied flats ====
- Fulvous pied flat, Coladenia dan (Fabricius, 1787)

==== Genus Gerosis—white flat ====
- Common yellowbreasted flat, Gerosis bhagava (Moore, 1865) ?

==== Genus Gomalia ====
- African mallow/marbled skipper, Gomalia elma (Trimen, 1862)

==== Genus Odontoptilum—angles ====
- Chestnut/banded angle, Odontoptilum angulatum (Felder, 1862)

==== Genus Sarangesa—small flats ====
- Common small flat, Sarangesa dasahara (Moore, 1865)
- Spotted small flat, Sarangesa purendra (Moore, 1882)

==== Genus Spialia —grizzled skippers ====
- Indian grizzled/Indian skipper, Spialia galba (Fabricius, 1793)

==== Genus Tagiades—snow flats ====
- Immaculate/large/suffused snow flat, Tagiades gana (Moore, 1865)
- Common/Ceylon snow flat, Tagiades jepetus (Stoll, 1782)
- Water snow flat, Tagiades litigiosa (Möschler, 1878)

==== Genus Tapena—angles ====
- Angled flat/black angle, Tapena thwaitesi (Moore, 1881)

== See also ==
- Butterfly
- List of butterflies of India
- Western Ghats butterflies
- Fauna of India
