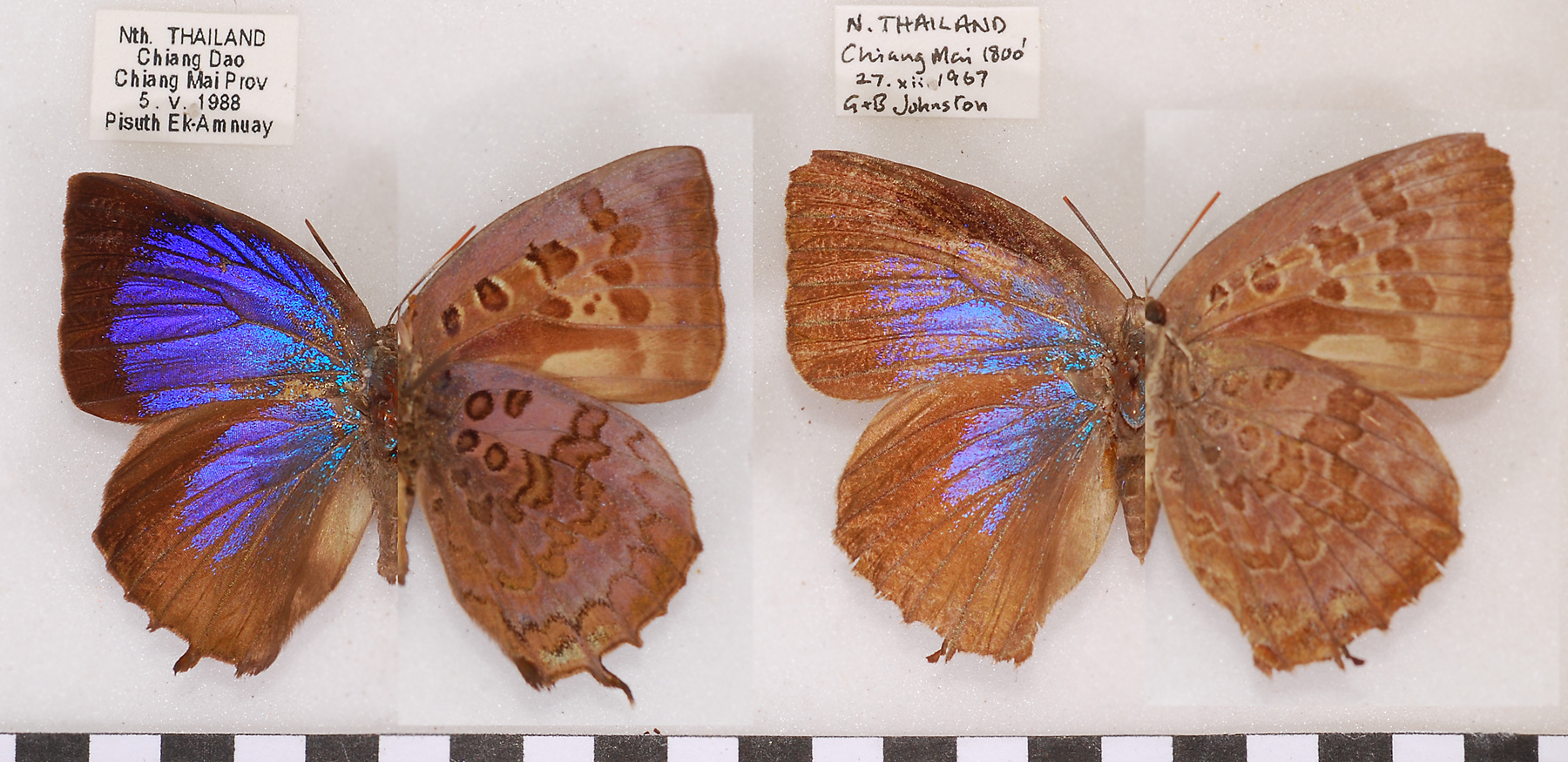
- Arhopala amantes amatrix
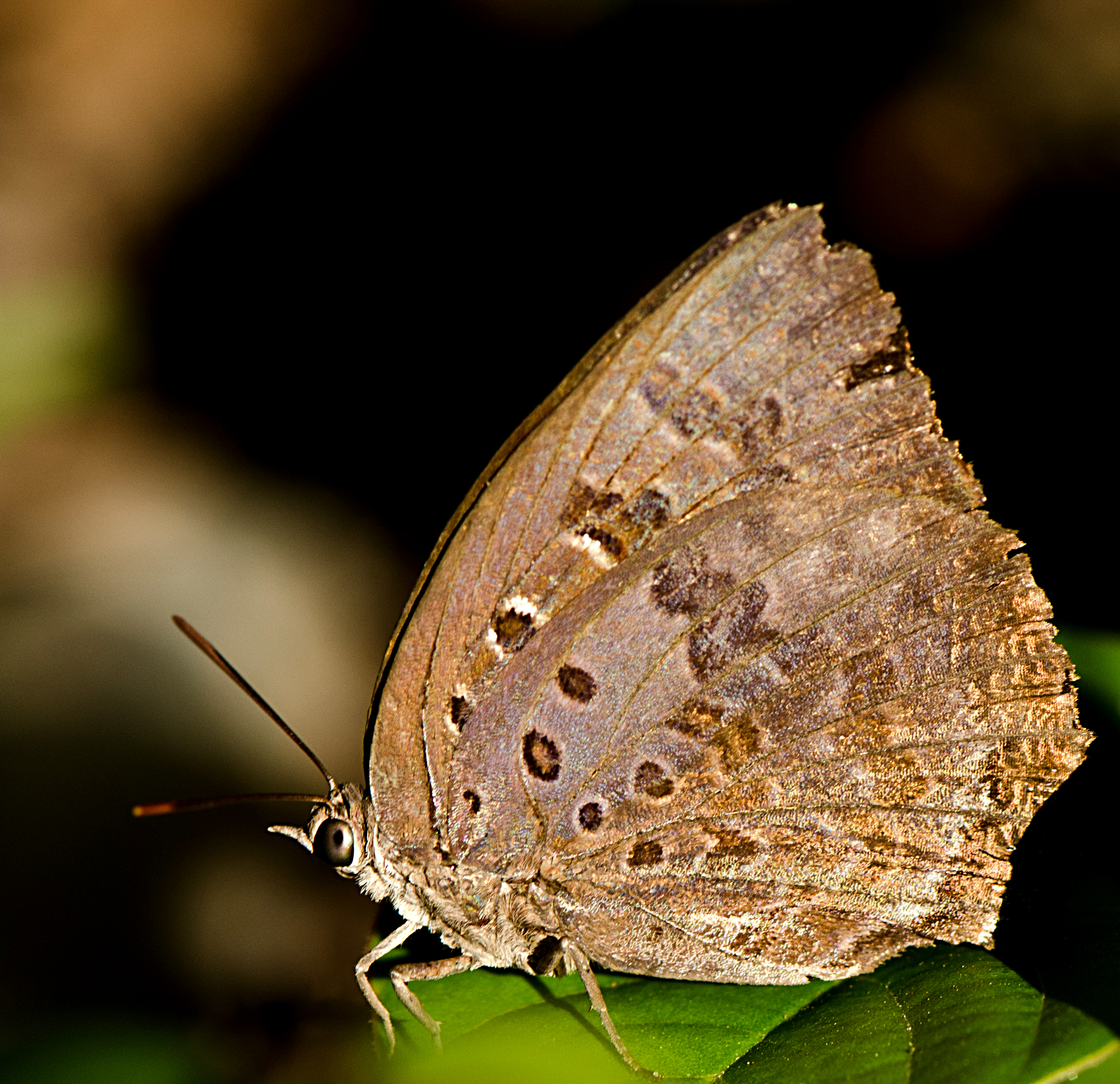
- At Bangalore, Karnataka, India

Scientific classification
- Kingdom: Animalia
- Phylum: Arthropoda
- Clade: Pancrustacea
- Class: Insecta
- Order: Lepidoptera
- Family: Lycaenidae
- Genus: Arhopala
- Species: A. amantes

Binomial name
- Arhopala amantes (Hewitson, 1862)

Synonyms
- Amblypodia amantes

= Arhopala amantes =

Large oakblue

Species of butterfly

Arhopala amantes, the large oakblue, is a species of lycaenid or blue butterfly found in Asia.(India, Ceylon, Burma, Thailand)

Arhopala amantes is the largest lycaenid. It is surprisingly inconspicuous on the wing despite the brilliant metallic blue markings on its upperside. In the female, the blue scales are restricted to the centre and basal part of both wings; the outer margins are marked by a wide black band.

== Description ==
Male. Upperside dark purple-blue, shining in certain lights, coloured somewhat like Arhopala centaurus pirithous, but brighter blue, costal and outer marginal line black. Cilia black, tails black, a rather long tail at the end of vein 2, slight projections at the ends of all the other veins of the hindwing, more pronounced at the ends of veins 1 and 3 than at the ends of the others. Underside grey suffused with pinkish-brown, the lower portion of forewing pale, the hindwing darker than the forewing, but varying much in shade of colour, spots and bands chocolate-brown. Forewing with a small spot in the cell near the base, a larger one in the middle, four conjoined spots at the end, the third from the upper end minute and sometimes absent, a discal band of conjoined spots from the costa to vein 2, increasing in size hind wards, the band slightly outwardly curved, sometimes very nearly straight down, but the middle spot is always a little outside the others, all these spots and bands edged with bluish-white; a sub-terminal indistinct brown band and still more indistinct terminal band. Hindwing with four sub-basal spots, three in a row, the fourth near the abdominal margin, followed by two spots, an outwardly curved bar at the end of the cell, with dark brown edges, with two spots in an inward curve below it, a discal outwardly curved irregular band of spots and curves, commencing on the costa with a large brown patch composed of two squarish spots joined together, a sub-marginal lunular thick brown line and an anteciliary thinner line, both more or less lunular, the latter edged outwardly with bluish-white near the anal angle where there is a black spot in the lobe capped with bluish-white, the bands with indications of very indistinct similar bands between them, a black terminal line. Antennae black; palpi black above, whitish beneath; head and body blackish-brown above, grey beneath. Female. Upperside paler and brighter blue merging into black on the outer parts, forming broad costal and outer marginal bands on the Forewing, with generally a black spot at the upper end of the cell; the Hindwing with similar costal and marginal bands, narrowing much in the middle of the outer margin, then broadening hindwards with some blackish suffusion running up near the abdominal space, which is pale. Underside as in the male.

— Charles Swinhoe, Lepidoptera Indica. Vol. VIII

== Ecology ==
It is a butterfly of the canopy of small trees, occasionally coming down to settle on shrubs and low bushes. It flies about a great deal during the day but often with long periods of resting in between flights. To rest, it usually selects a leaf exposed to full sun at a considerable height above ground.

The eggs are laid on the leaves of Syzygium, Terminalia and Hopea species. The larvae and pupae are always attended by red ants.

It is not endangered.

== Gallery ==
Egg

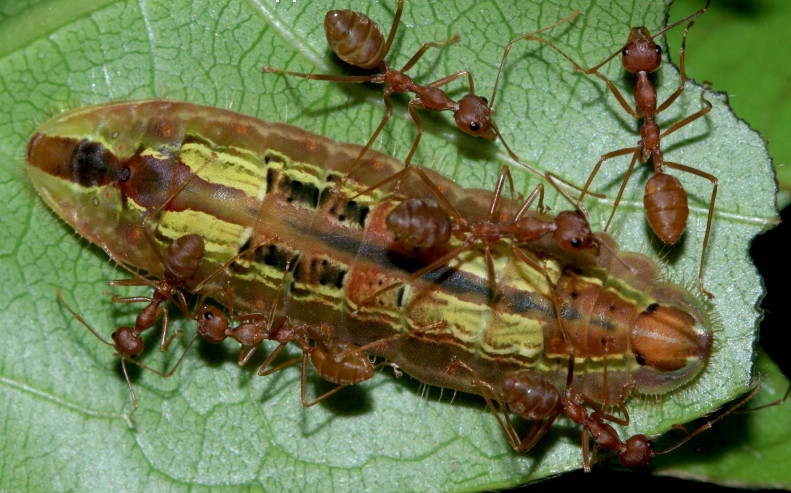
Larva

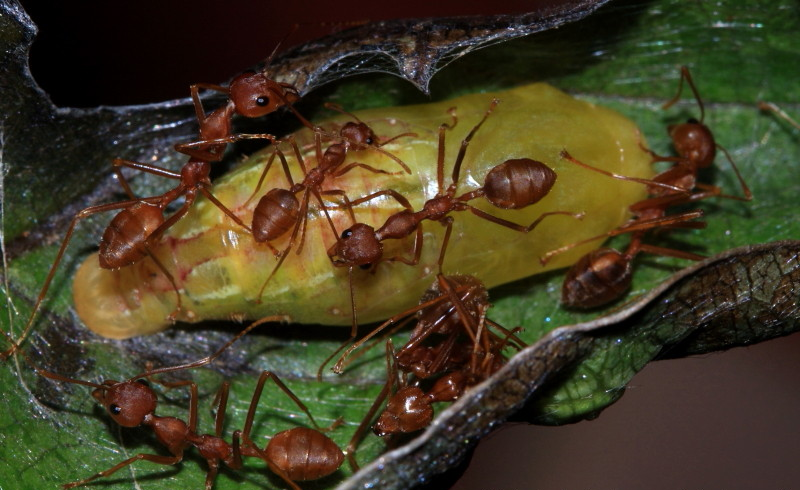
Pupation

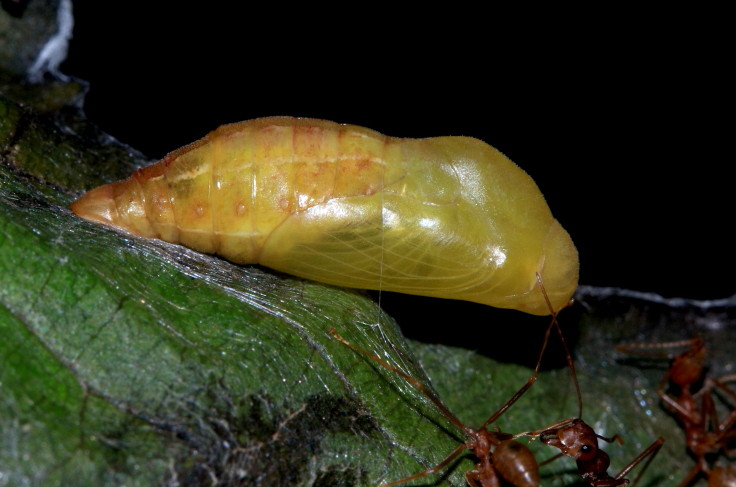
Chrysalis

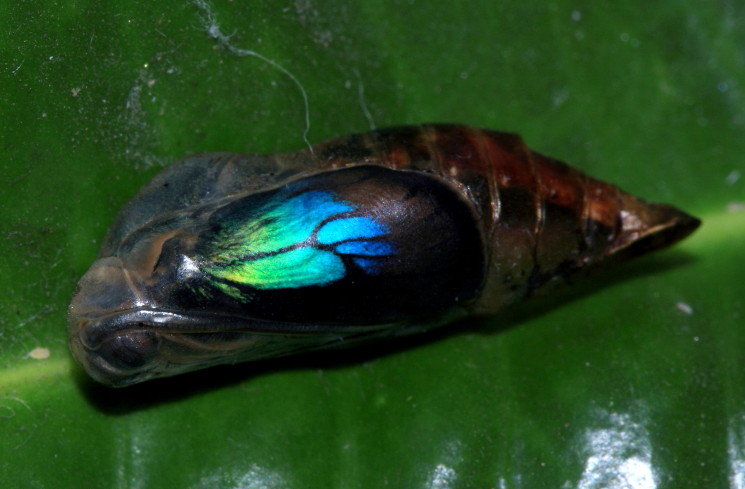
Chrysalis (final stage)

Imago (dorsal view)

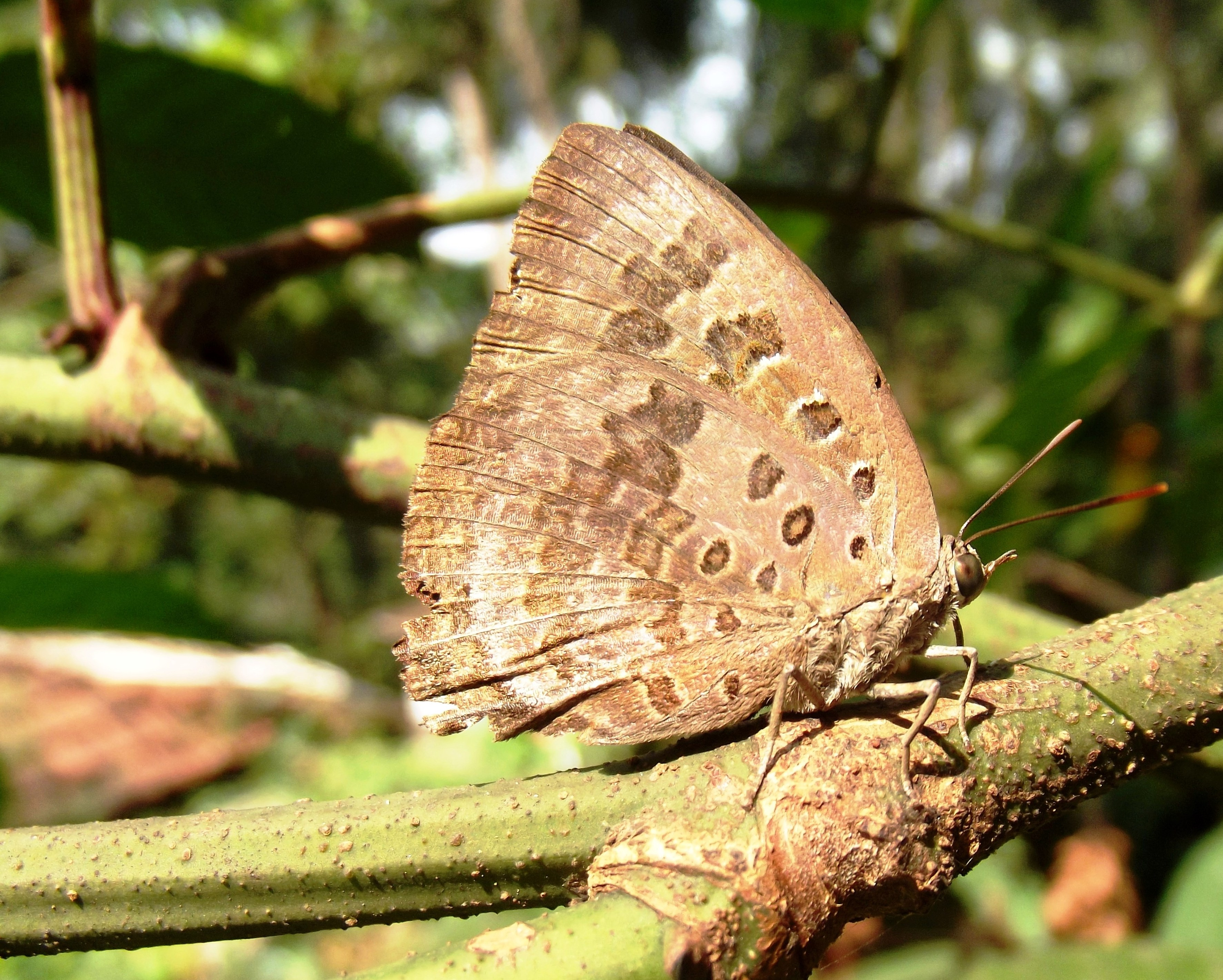
Imago (lateral view)

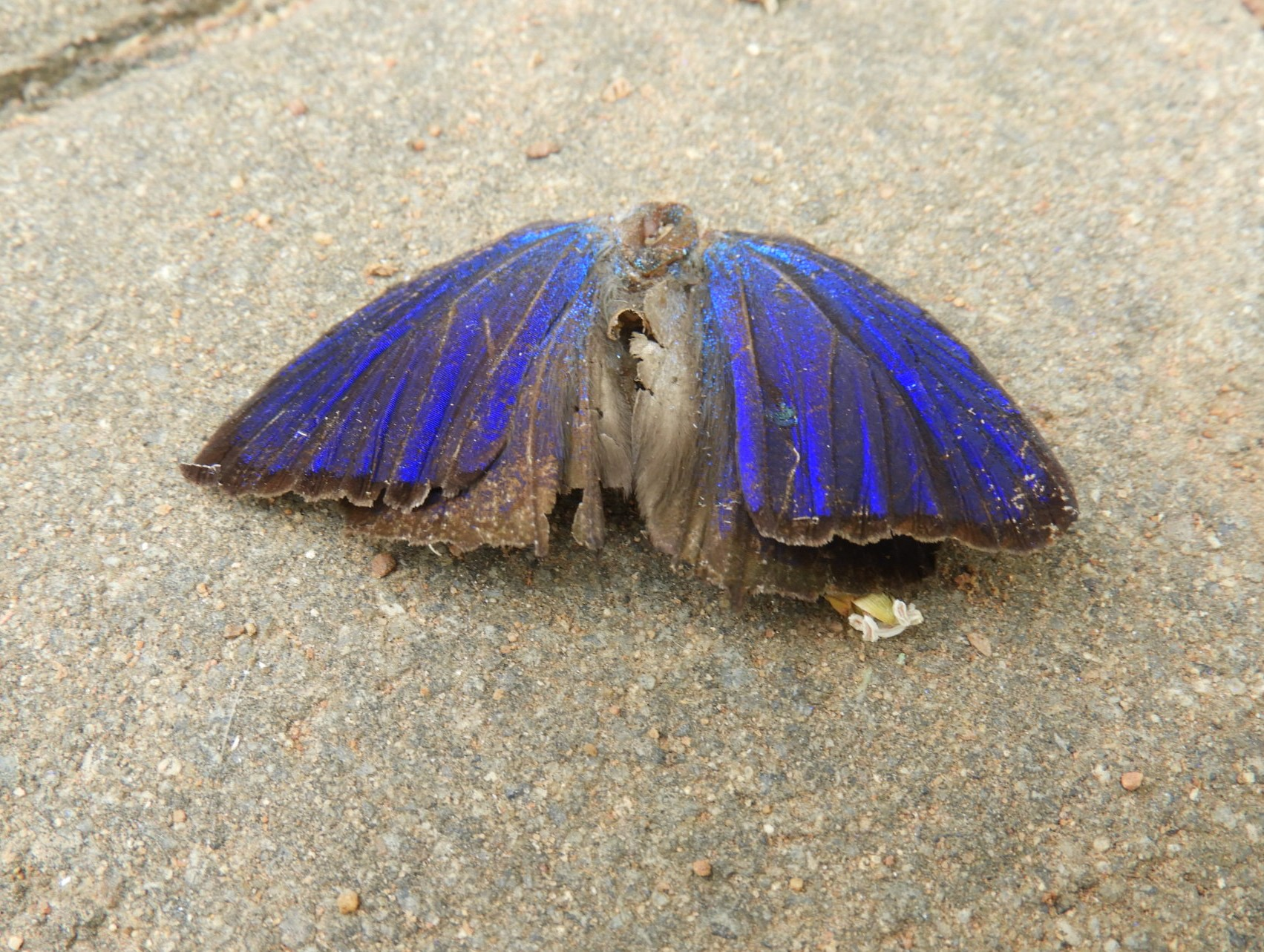
Dead (Dorsal view)

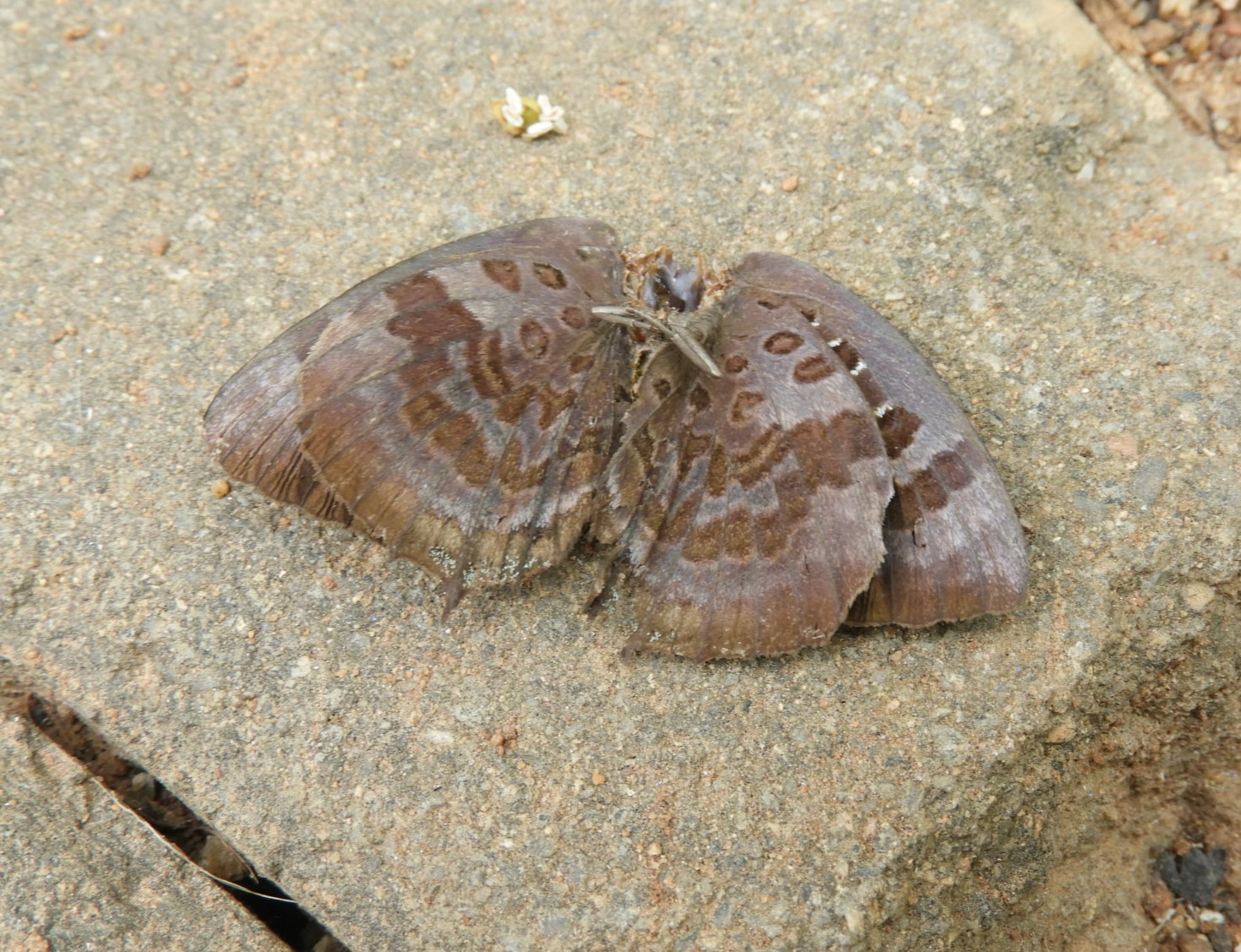
Dead (Lateral view)
