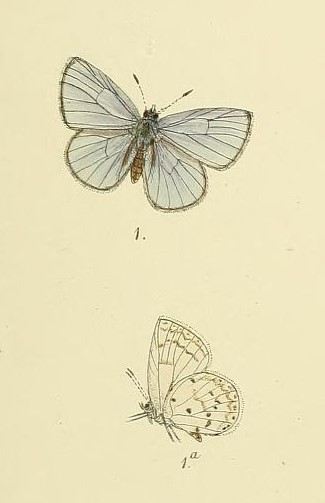

Scientific classification
- Kingdom: Animalia
- Phylum: Arthropoda
- Class: Insecta
- Order: Lepidoptera
- Family: Lycaenidae
- Genus: Udara
- Species: U. singalensis

Binomial name
- Udara singalensis (R. Felder, 1868)

Synonyms
- Lycaena singalensis R. Felder, 1868; Polyommatus singalensis (R. Felder, 1868); Cyaniris singalensis (R. Felder, 1868); Lycaenopsis singalensis (R. Felder, 1868); Celastrina singalensis (R. Felder, 1868)

= Udara singalensis =

Species of butterfly

Udara singalensis, the Singalese hedge blue, is a species of Lycaenidae butterfly. It is endemic to Sri Lanka.

== Description ==
Race singalensis, Felder. Male upperside: purplish blue with in certain lights a refulgent (resplendent) silvery iridescence, most conspicuous along the costa of the forewing, forewings and hindwings: a very narrow black edging to the terminal margins narrower on the hindwing than on the forewing, not dilated towards the apex of the latter. Cilia conspicuously white. Underside: silvery white with a slight tinge of blue; both forewings and hindwings with the usual Cyaniris markings. Forewing: the postdiscal series of abbreviated lines or elongate spots pale brown, very regular, placed almost end to end, the series slightly curved and not closer lo the termen posteriorly than anteriorly. Hindwing: the markings are pale brown, regular but small, the subbasal transverse series of three spots and the subcostal spot in interspace 7 black, the latter not larger than the others. Both forewings and hindwings: with the spots of the subterminal series very small, mere black dots; the inner subterminal series of markings lunular and generally somewhat blurred, the posterior lunules on the forewing distinctly broadened as in the typical form but not so prominently; finally, the anteciliary black line very slender and clearly defined. Antenna, head, thorax and abdomen blackish, the antenna ringed with white, the thorax clothed with purplish-blue pubescence (fine hairs); beneath: palpi, thorax and abdomen white.

Female upperside, forewing: costa and termen very broadly blackish brown; the remainder of the wing purplish blue, paling almost to white towards the anterior, outer portion. Hindwing: costa broadly, termen and dorsum more narrowly blackish brown, the rest of the wing pale purplish blue, the colour getting still paler on the anterior and outer portion as on the forewing: the blackish-brown edging on the terminal margin reduced posteriorly to an anteciliary black line within which there is a transverse series of subterminal black spots enclosed further inwards by an obscure series of dark lunules. Underside: ground colour and markings as in the male. Antenna, head, thorax and abdomen similar but darker.

== Range ==
It is found in Sri Lanka.

== See also ==
- List of butterflies of India (Lycaenidae)
