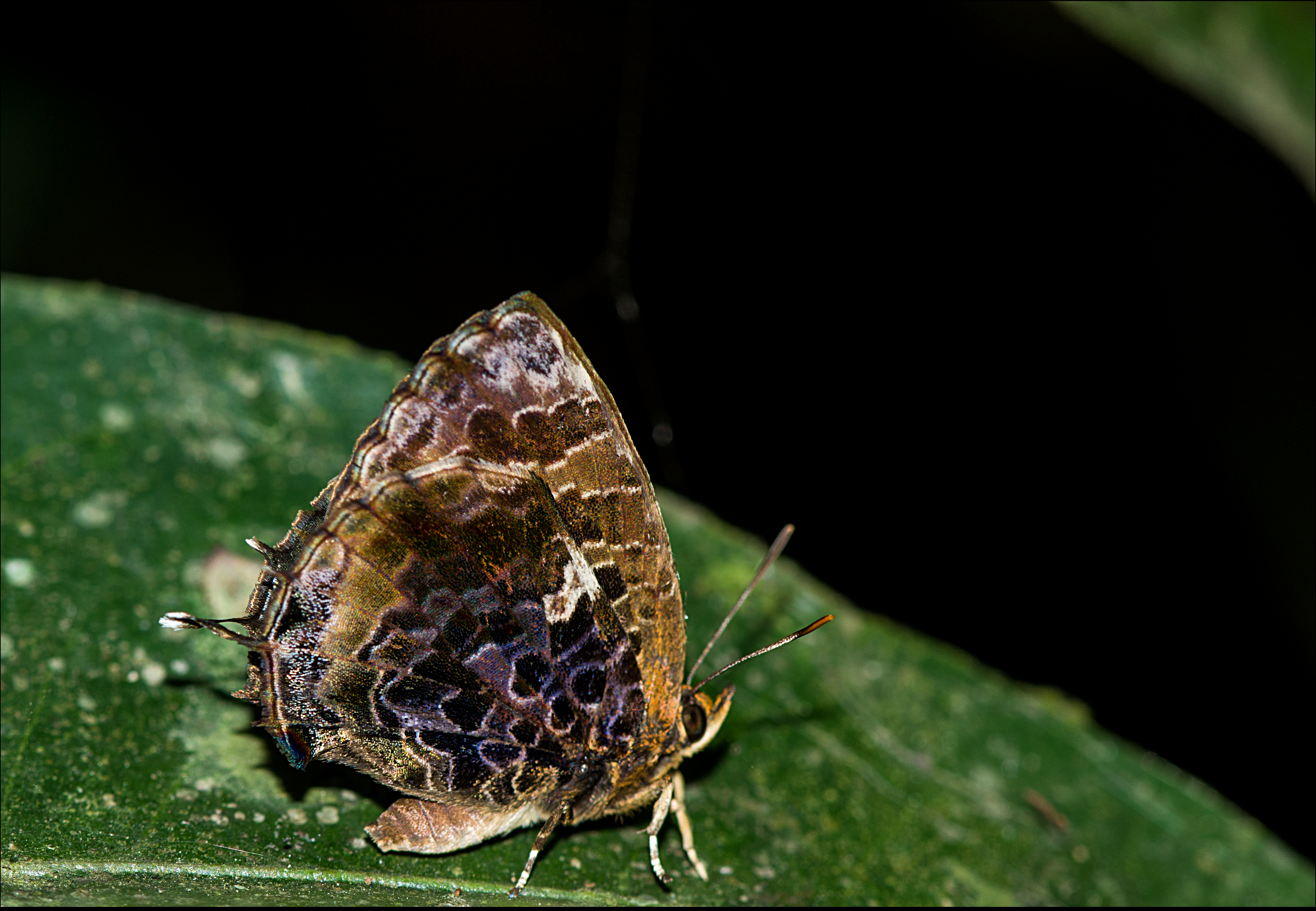

Scientific classification
- Kingdom: Animalia
- Phylum: Arthropoda
- Clade: Pancrustacea
- Class: Insecta
- Order: Lepidoptera
- Family: Lycaenidae
- Genus: Arhopala
- Species: A. abseus

Binomial name
- Arhopala abseus (Hewitson, 1862)

Synonyms
- Amblypodia abseus Hewitson, 1862

= Arhopala abseus =

Aberrant oakblue

Species of butterfly

Arhopala abseus, the aberrant oakblue or aberrant bushblue, is a species of lycaenid or blue butterfly found in Asia.

== Description ==
Male. Upperside dark bright blue, veins more or less black. Forewing with broad black borders, gradually widening from the base of the costa to the apex of the wing, down the outer margin curving and broadening slightly at the hinder angle. Hiidwing with the costal and outer marginal black band also broad and of a fairly uniform breadth, the black colour running as broadly up the abdominal margin; a rather long filamentous tail, black tipped with white, at the end of vein 2, and short black projections at the ends of veins 1 and 3. Costa highly arched at base, then nearly straight to the apex, which is sub-acute, outer margin evenly rounded, except for the projections mentioned. Cilia black, with white tips towards the apices of both wings. Underside. Forewing with the ground colour shining pinkish-grey, the basal and upper half of the wing suffused with dark pinkish-brown, paling somewhat outwardly, markings darker brown, edged with whitish, two round spots of nearly equal size inside the cell, and two paler ones below them, a band of conjoined square spots from the costa, increasing in size hindwards, crossing the end of the cell to vein 2, the band containing two or three small projections on each side, a discal similar band of five conjoined spots from the costa to vein 3, the fourth spot the largest, its outer end projecting a little outwards, the band continued by two paler and narrower brown marks in the next two interspaces; terminal line blackish, a sub-terminal series of blackish lunules, the three middle ones most prominent, and between the line and the sub-terminal series is a darker line of conjoined hinular marks. Hindwing nearly entirely suffused with dark pinkish-brown, a whitish mark on the middle of the costa, a sub-basal row of five conjoined spots, the four lower ones round, closely followed by a row of four round spots, the last one touching the fourth spot of the first row, an irregular, outwardly curved discal band, dislocated hindwards and obscured upwards by the white mark on the middle of the costa, followed by an irregular extra discal narrow band; terminal line blackish, a sub-terminal series of indistinct pale brown lunular marks, a large narrow sub-terminal black spot in interspace 3, and a round one at the anal angle, both capped with metallic blue-green scales. Antenna3 black; palpi black above, grey beneath; head and body blackish above, with dark blue pubescence, thorax brown beneath, abdomen grey.

— Charles Swinhoe, Lepidoptera Indica. Vol. VIII

== Subspecies ==
- A. a. abseus Peninsular Malaya, Sumatra, Singapore, Borneo, Palawan
- A. a. mackwoodi (Riley, 1923) Ceylon
- A. a. ophiala Corbet, 1941 South Thailand, South Burma
- A. a. indicus Riley, 1923 Sikkim - North Burma, North Thailand
- A. a. amphea C. & R. Felder, [1865] Philippines
