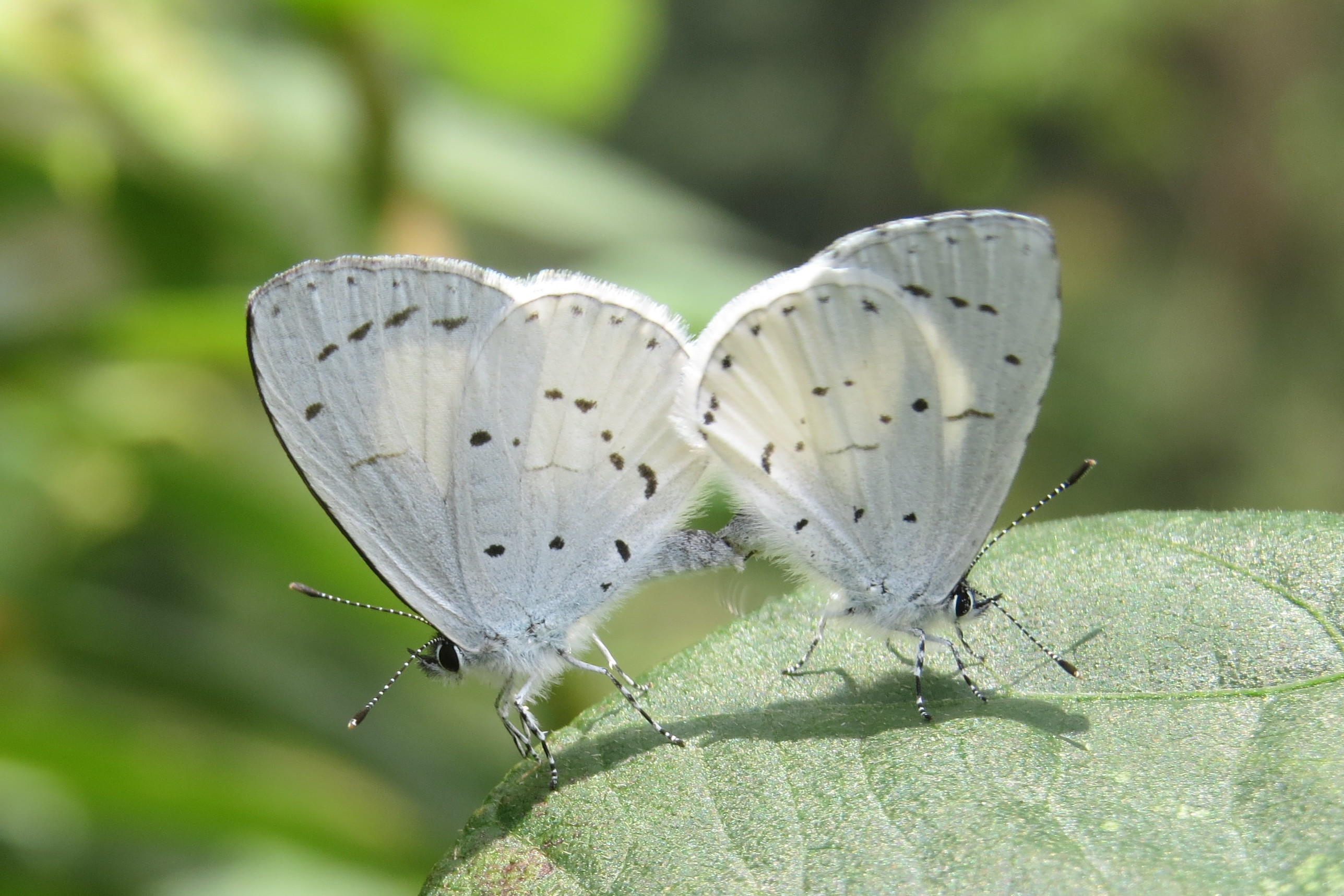

Scientific classification
- Domain: Eukaryota
- Kingdom: Animalia
- Phylum: Arthropoda
- Class: Insecta
- Order: Lepidoptera
- Family: Lycaenidae
- Genus: Udara
- Species: U. akasa

Binomial name
- Udara akasa (Horsfield, 1828)

Synonyms
- Akasinula akasa Cyaniris akasa Lycaenopsis akasa

= Udara akasa =

White hedge blue

Species of butterfly

Udara akasa, the white hedge blue, is a small butterfly found in India that belongs to the lycaenids or blues family.

== Description ==
Male upperside, forewing: black; a medial triangular area that extends from base outwards to the disc white, suffused at base and anteriorly with iridescent blue that spreads upwards on to the black of the costa; along the dorsum the black ground colour is much paler, in most specimens diffuse fuscous. Hindwing: white, basal third and costal margin broadly suffused with fuscous, the fuscous at base posteriorly overlaid with iridescent blue; a subterminal series of fuscous-black dots and a distinct but very slender black anteciliary line. Underside: white very slightly tinged with bluish; markings all fuscous black, minute and very slender. Forewing: a short discocellular line followed by on anteriorly, strongly curved, discal series of very short detached lines and a more or less obsolescent transverse series of subterminal dots. Hindwing: three subbasal dots in transverse order; a short line on the discocellulars; a spot below the middle of the costa with a smaller spot below it; a posterior discal irregular sinuous series of five or six minute spots and a perfectly regular subterminal series of similar spots. Cilia of both forewings and hindwings white. Antennae, head, thorax and abdomen blackish, the antennae ringed with white; beneath: the palpi, thorax and abdomen snow-white.

Female: Very similar. Upperside: the white area much more extended on both forewings and hindwings. On the former it spreads well into the cell, the latter three-fourths of the wing are white; the dusky basal and costal areas much more restricted than in the male. The iridescent blue suffusion is in many specimens entirely absent, in a few very faintly indicated; the subterminal series of black dots so distinct in the male are generally faint and obsolescent. Underside: as in the male but the markings less distinct. Antennae, head, thorax and abdomen as in the male.

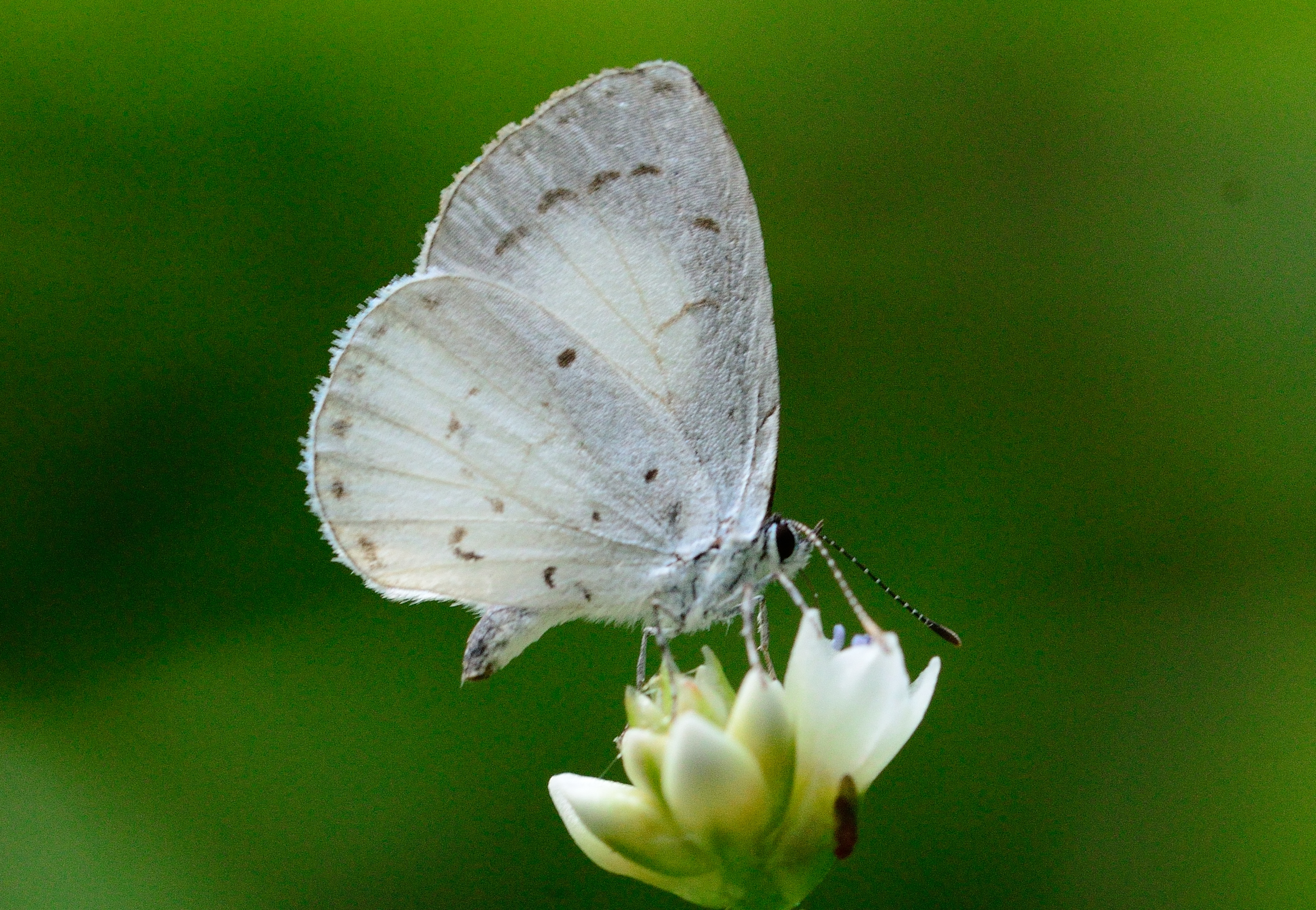
at Coorg, Karnataka

== Range ==
It is found in Sri Lanka, Western Ghats and Malaya.

== See also ==
- List of butterflies of India (Lycaenidae)
