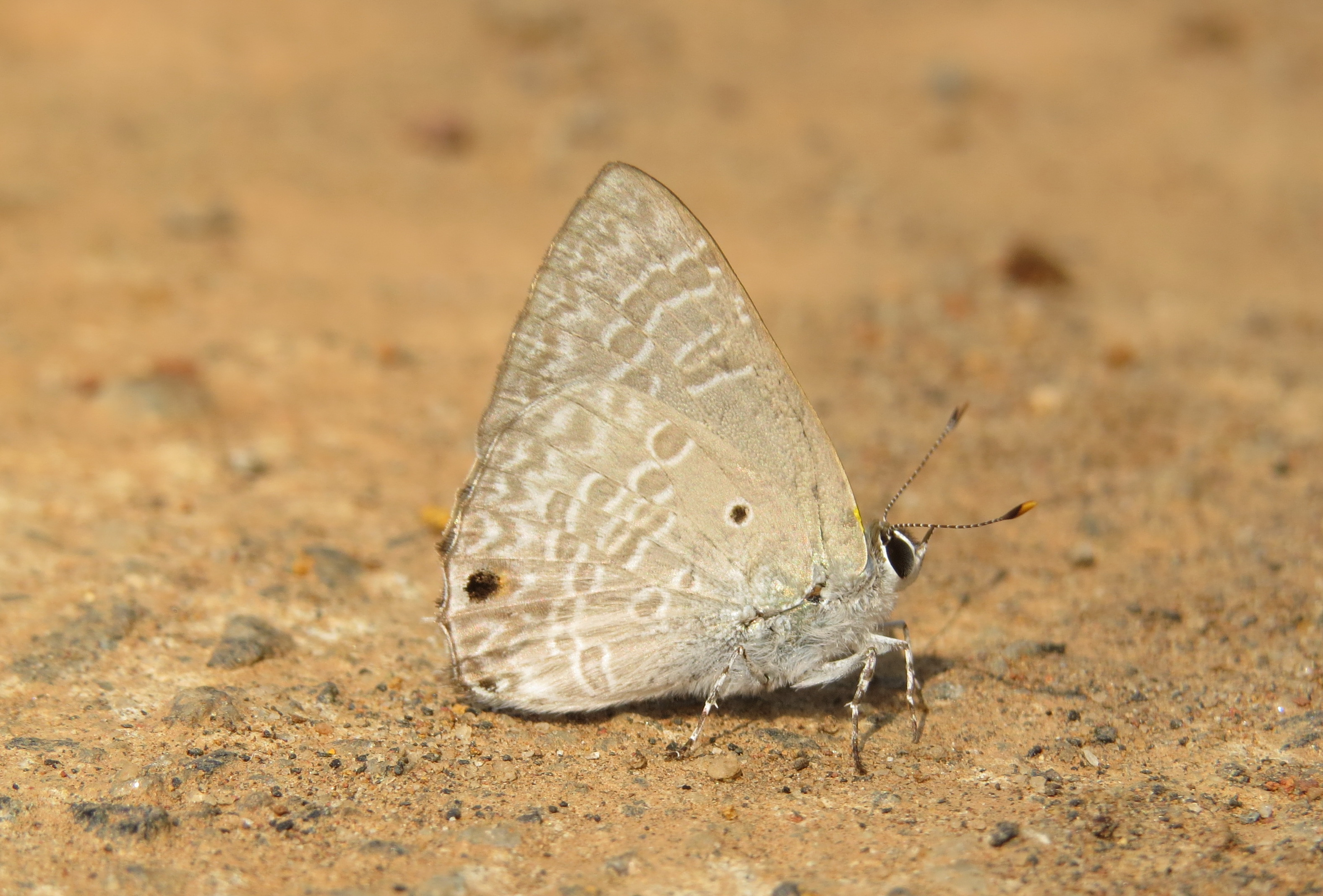

Scientific classification
- Domain: Eukaryota
- Kingdom: Animalia
- Phylum: Arthropoda
- Class: Insecta
- Order: Lepidoptera
- Family: Lycaenidae
- Genus: Anthene
- Species: A. lycaenina

Binomial name
- Anthene lycaenina (C. Felder 1868)

Synonyms
- Pseudodipsas lycaenina Felder, 1868; Lycaenesthes lycaenina; Lycaenesthes orissica Moore, 1884; Lycaenesthes lycambes Hewitson, 1878; Lycaenesthes lycaenina togata Fruhstorfer, 1916; Lycaenesthes lycaenoides bogorensis Toxopeus, 1929; Lycaenesthes lycaenina villosina Fruhstorfer, 1923; Lycaenesthes lycaenina miya Fruhstorfer, 1916

= Anthene lycaenina =

Pointed ciliate blue

Species of butterfly

Anthene lycaenina, the pointed ciliate blue, is a small butterfly found in India that belongs to the lycaenids or blues family found in Indomalayan realm. The species was first described by Cajetan Felder in 1868.

== Description ==
It closely resembles Anthene emolus. In both sexes however, but especially in the male, the forewing is distinctly narrower and more acute at apex and the hindwing more acutely angulated at the tornus. In markings on the upperside the two forms are closely alike; on the underside they differ as follows: Ground colour similar but a shade darker. Forewing: the transverse discal band dislocated below vein 3 and shifted inwards so that the short band on the discocellulars and the anterior portion of the discal band form the two branches, the lower portion of the discal band the stem, of a rough Y-shaped figure. Hindwing: a large black or dark brown white-encircled spot touching vein 7 near its base (in A. emolus there is never any trace of such spot). The discal and terminal transverse bands with their pale or white edgings much more broken, irregular and confused. Antennae, head, thorax and abdomen as in the female of A. emolus, but on the underside the palpi, thorax and abdomen whiter with a slight bluish tint.

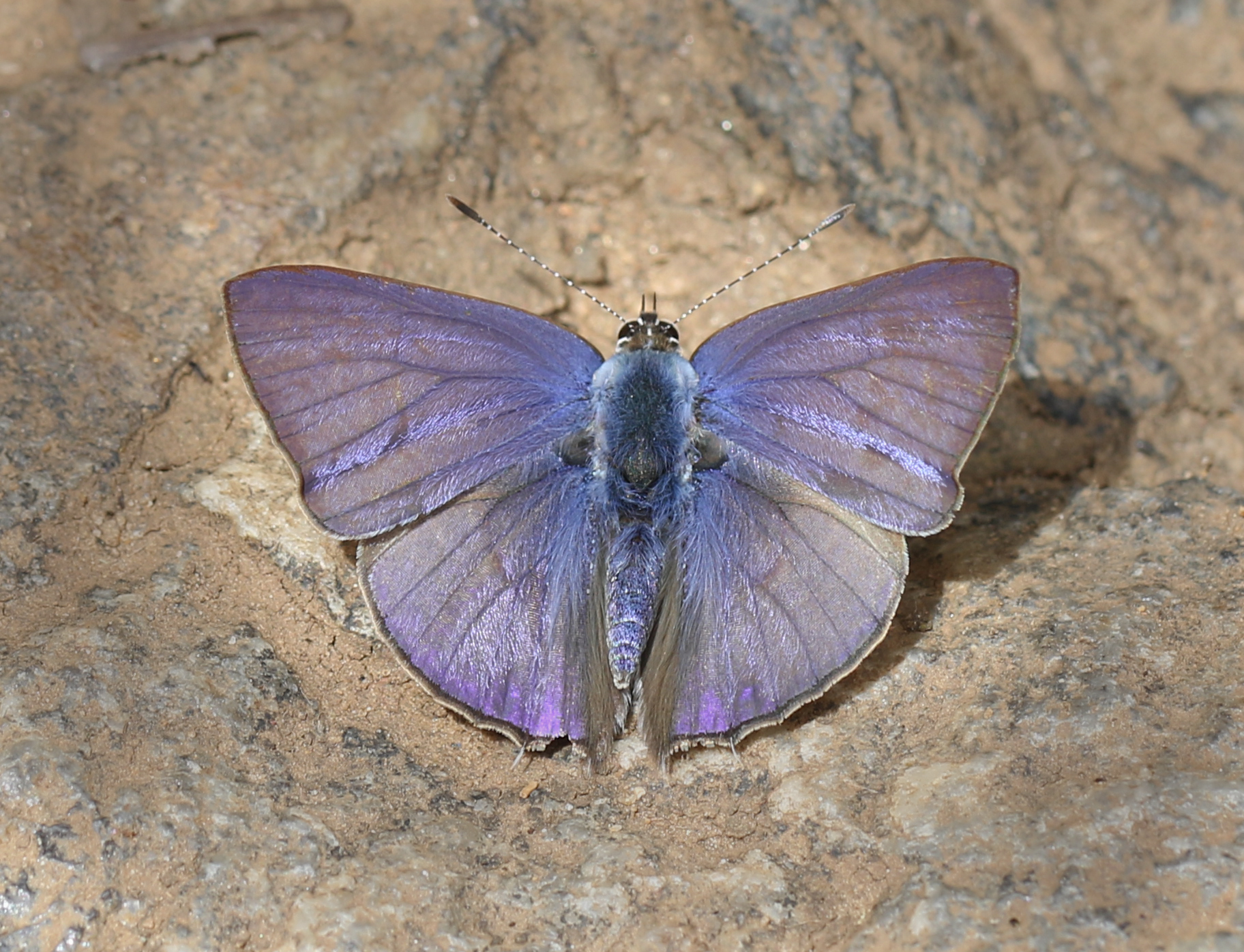
Upperside (male)

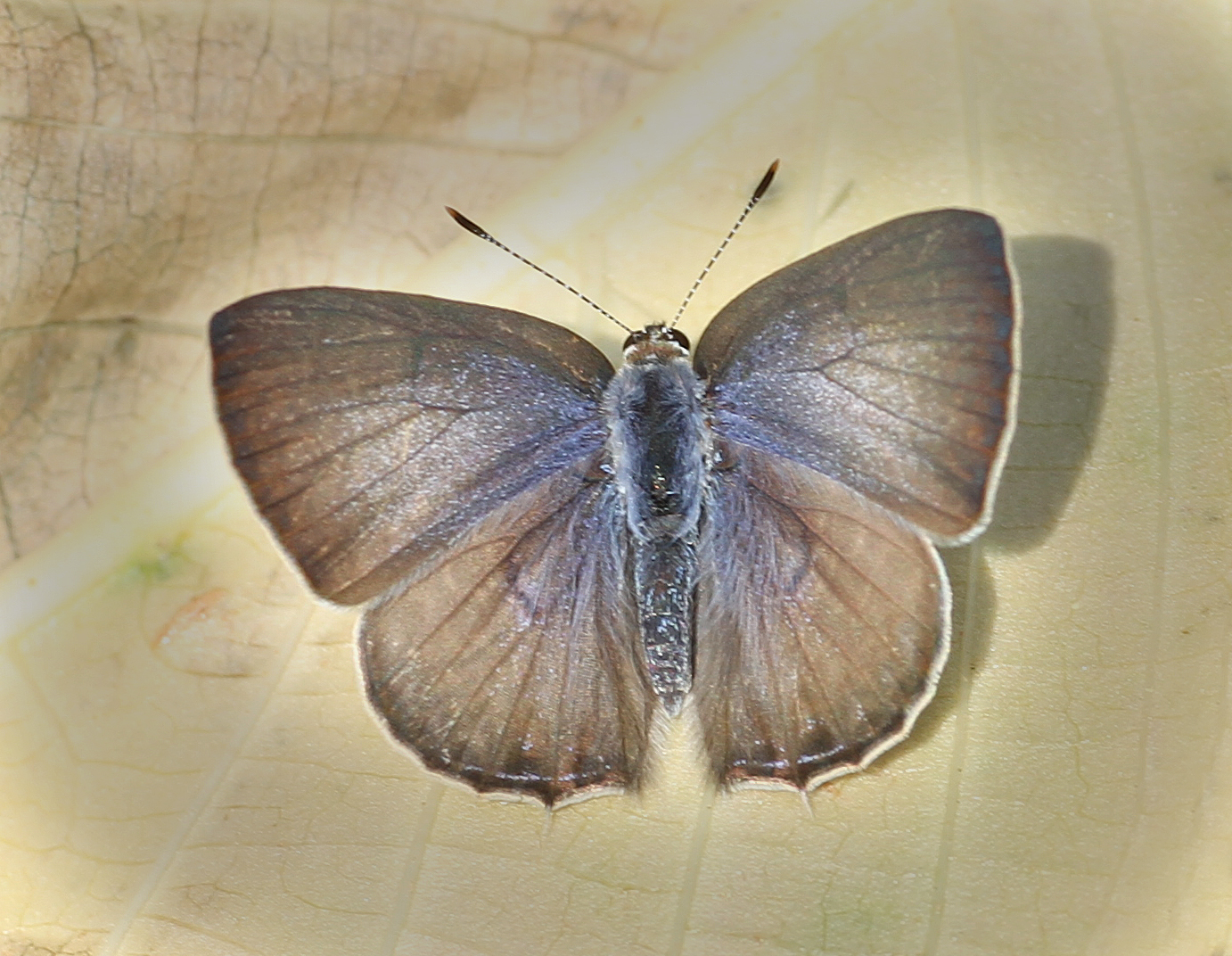
Upperside (female)

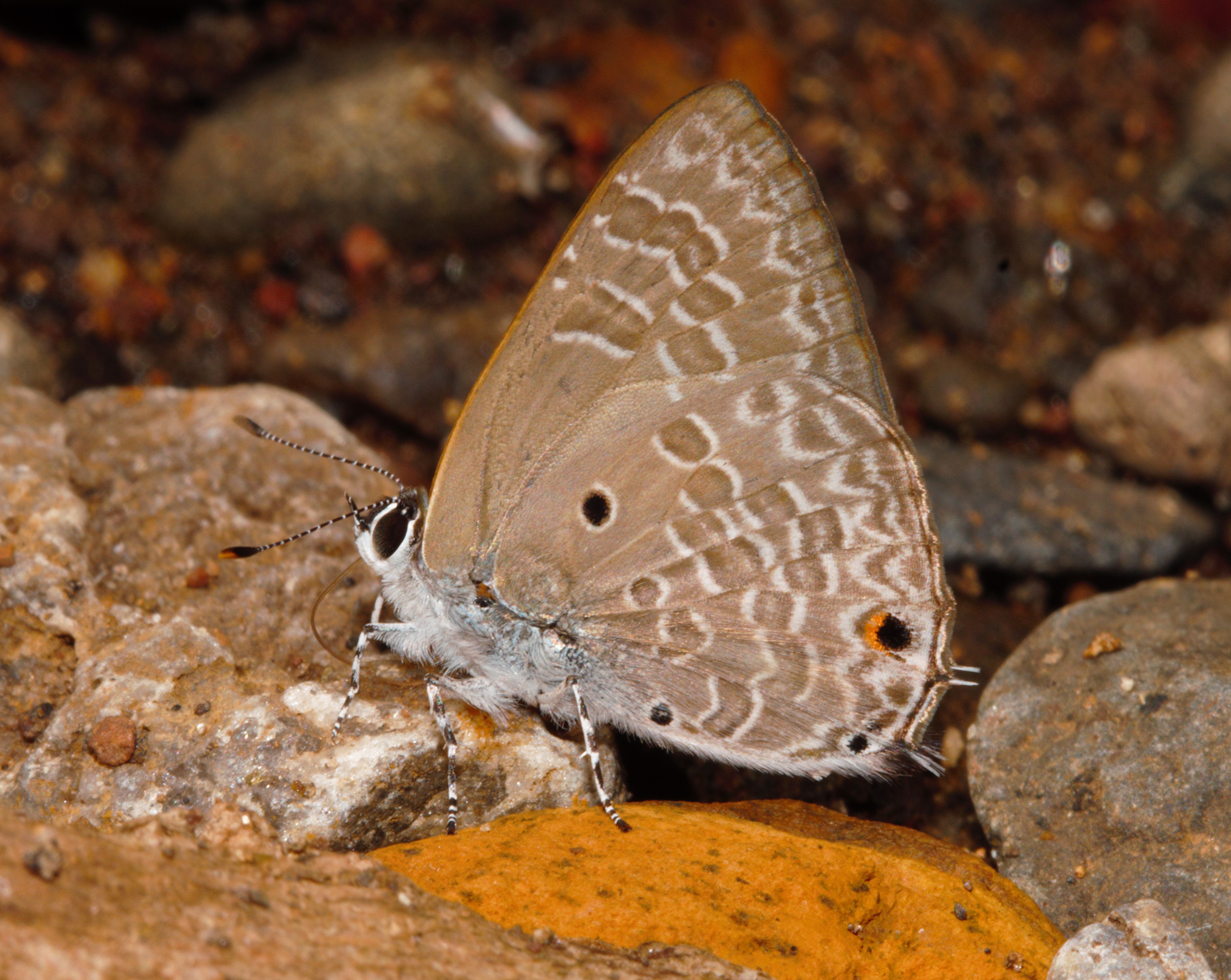
Underside (male)

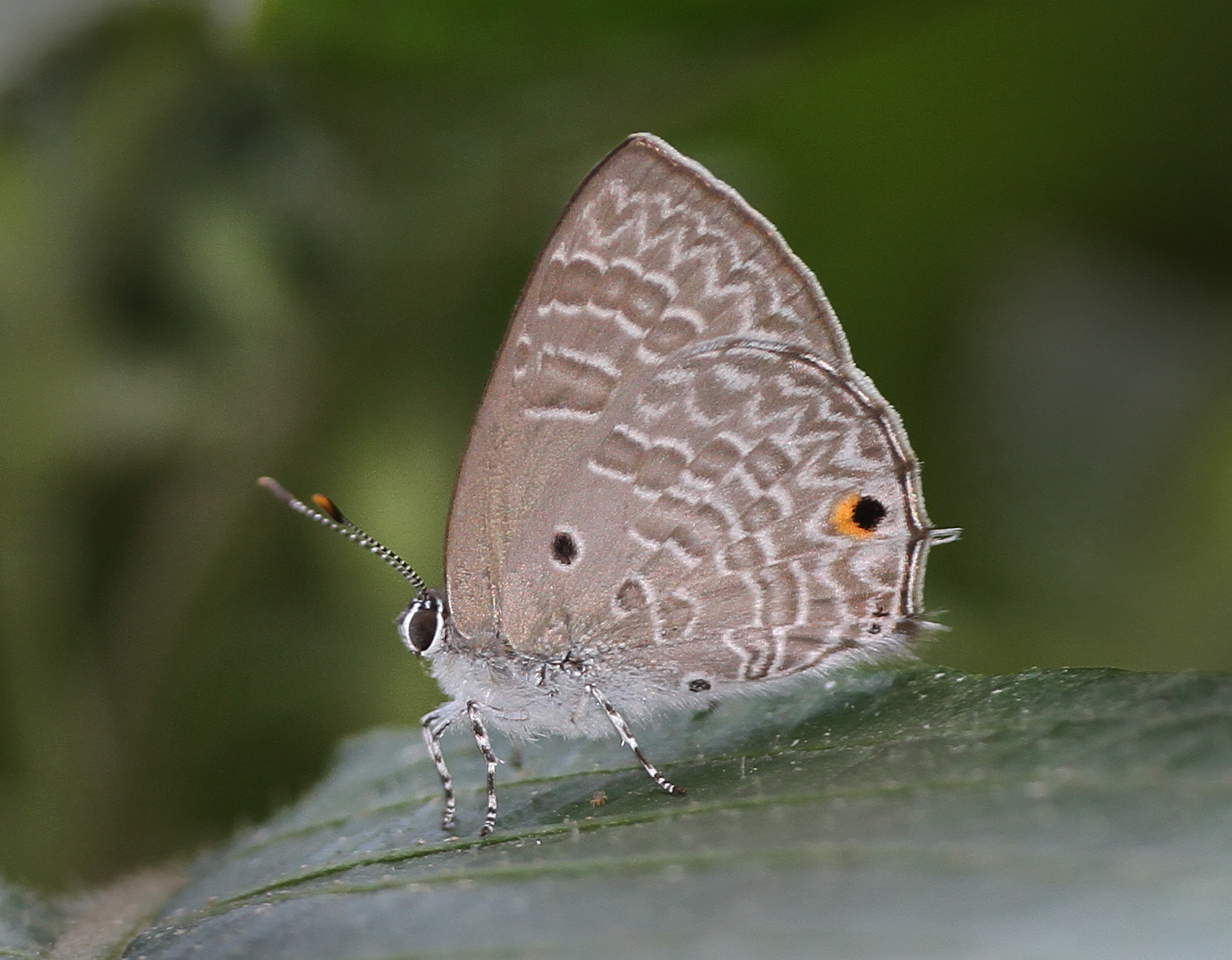
Underside (female)

== Subspecies ==
- A. l. lycaenina (Sri Lanka, southern India)
- A. l. lycambes (Hewitson, 1878) (north-western India to Indo China, Hainan, southern Yunnan)
- A. l. togata (Fruhstorfer, 1916) (Java, Lombok, Sumbawa)
- A. l. villosina (Fruhstorfer, 1923) (Philippines: Luzon)
- A. l. miya (Fruhstorfer, 1916) (Thailand, Malay Peninsula, Singapore, Borneo, Sumatra, Simeulue)

== See also ==
- Lycaenidae
- List of butterflies of India
- List of butterflies of India (Lycaenidae)
