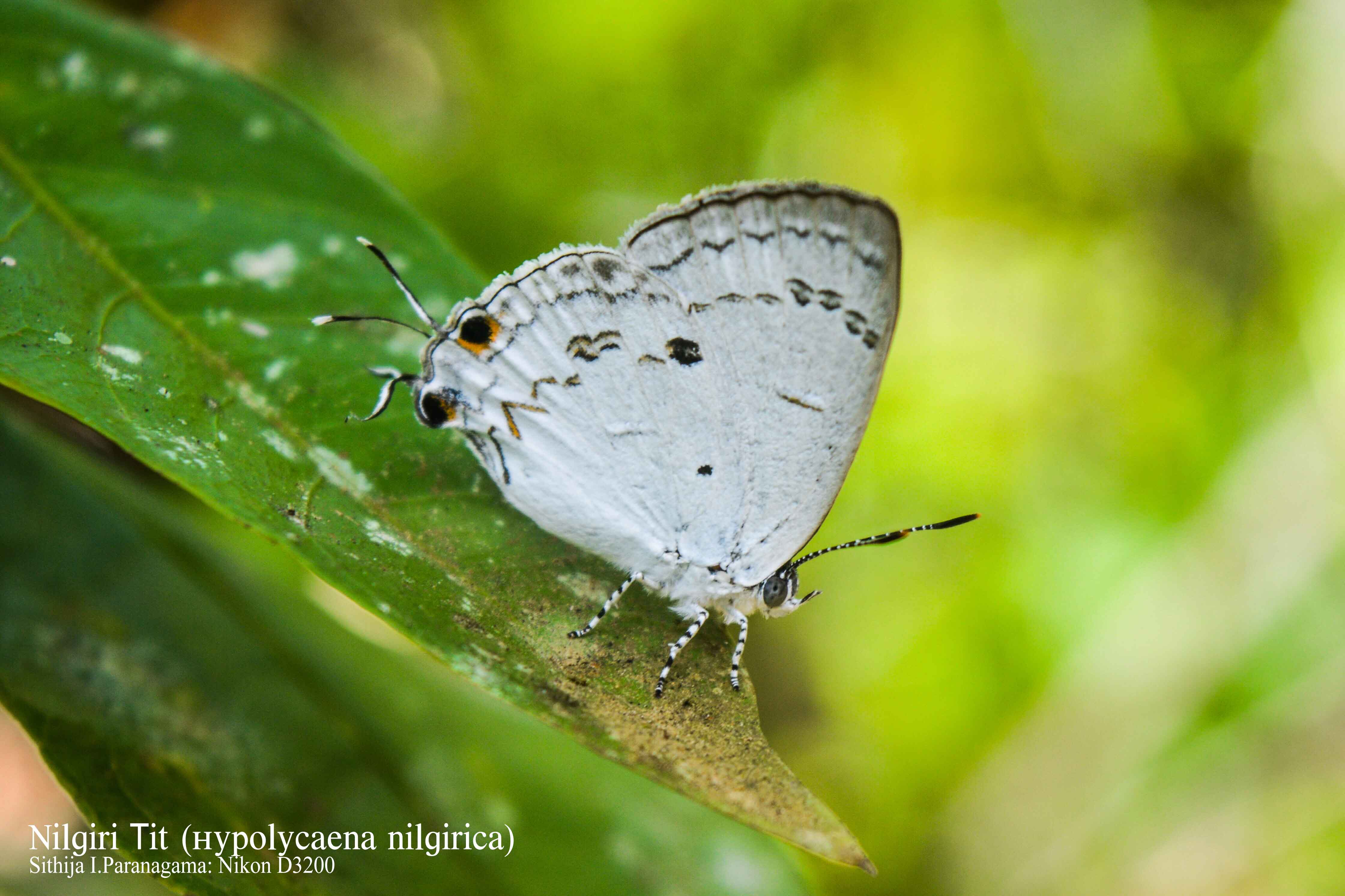
- Ventral view
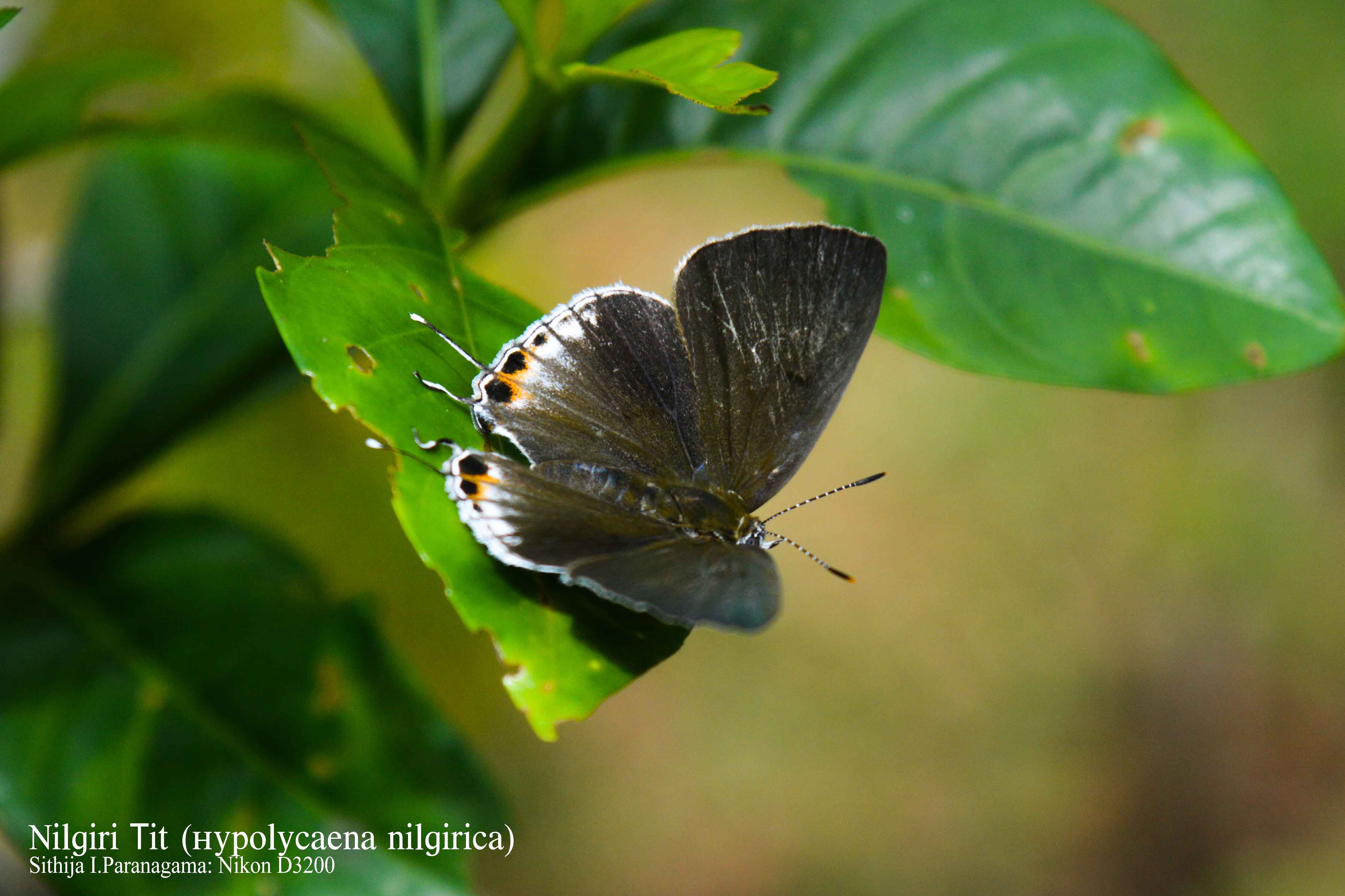
- Dorsal view

Scientific classification
- Kingdom: Animalia
- Phylum: Arthropoda
- Clade: Pancrustacea
- Class: Insecta
- Order: Lepidoptera
- Family: Lycaenidae
- Genus: Hypolycaena
- Species: H. nilgirica

Binomial name
- Hypolycaena nilgirica Moore, [1884]

Synonyms
- Chliaria nilgirica (Moore, [1884])

= Hypolycaena nilgirica =

Nilgiri tit

Species of butterfly

Hypolycaena nilgirica, the Nilgiri tit, is an uncommon species of lycaenid or blue butterfly found in Asia, especially in the lowland regions to mid-hills of India and Sri Lanka.

== Description ==
Male. Upperside brown. Forewing without markings, but shading darker at the costa and outer margin. Hindwing with the abdominal fold grey, with a white cilia, a small black spot on the inner side of the anal lobe, and a still smaller and indistinct black spot in each of the next two interspaces, the two latter capped with dull orange, and all three outwardly edged with white; tails black, tipped and ciliated with white. Cilia brown, with white tips. Underside creamy-white, markings dull orange. Forewing with a thin line at the end of the cell; a discal band, commencing at the costa, with four thin annular marks, the first three spots outwardly oblique, the fourth straight below the third, the band continued in very thin lunules almost straight down to the sub-median vein, a sub-marginal lunular thin line. Hindming with a black, rather prominent sub-basal spot below the costa, another, somewhat larger, outside, also below the costa, with the discal series running down from it in one disconnected thin line, then two annular thin marks in the middle, followed by a thin sinuous line which curves in the form of the letter W on to the abdominal margin one-fourth above the anal angle, a small black anal spot, another in the first median interspace, both faintly crowned with dull orange, and a sub-marginal lunular line as in the forewing. Antennae black, ringed with white, club with a dull orange tip; head and body above and below concolorous with the wings. Female. Upperside blackish-brown. Forewing without markings. Hindwing with a small black anal spot, a larger black, sub-terminal spot in each of the next two inter.spaces, and a small spot in each of the next two, the last four prominently capped with white lunules; terminal line black, with an inner white thread. Underside as in the male.

— Charles Swinhoe, Lepidoptera Indica. Vol. IX

The wingspan of both males and females ranges from 22 to 30 mm. The male is quite plain on the upperside and is brown, except for two orange tornal spots. The underside is silvery gray with lightly marked lines and speckles. Each hindwing of this butterfly has two tails. The markings of female are similar as the male but the tone is lighter.

== Behavior ==
It flies close to the ground and flight similar to much the common white fourring (Ypthima ceylonica). So it can be often mistaken for it.

== Food plants ==
Its larval host plants are orchid species such as Arundina graminifolia, Spathoglottis plicata, Vanda tesssellata, etc.

== See also ==
- List of butterflies of India (Lycaenidae)
