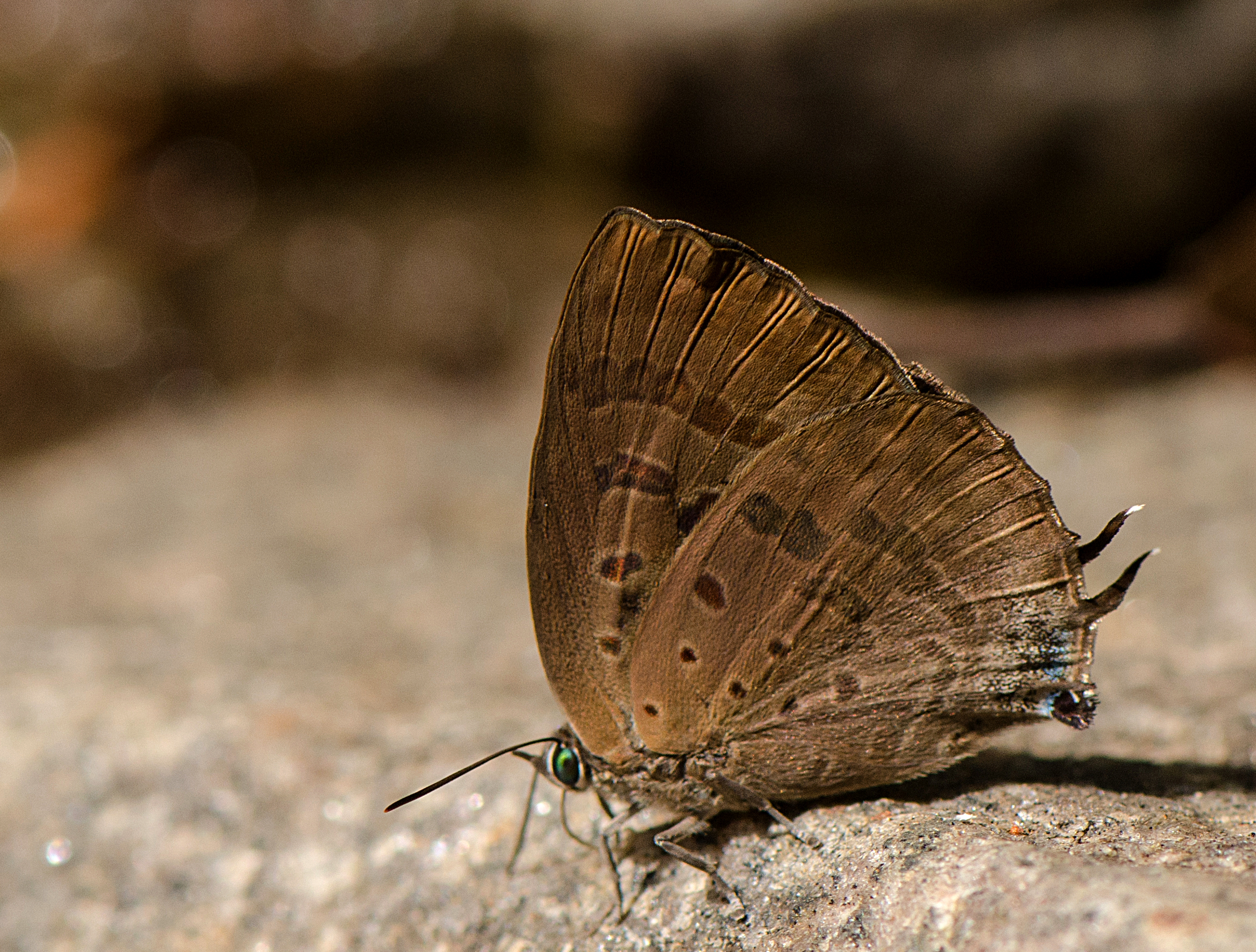

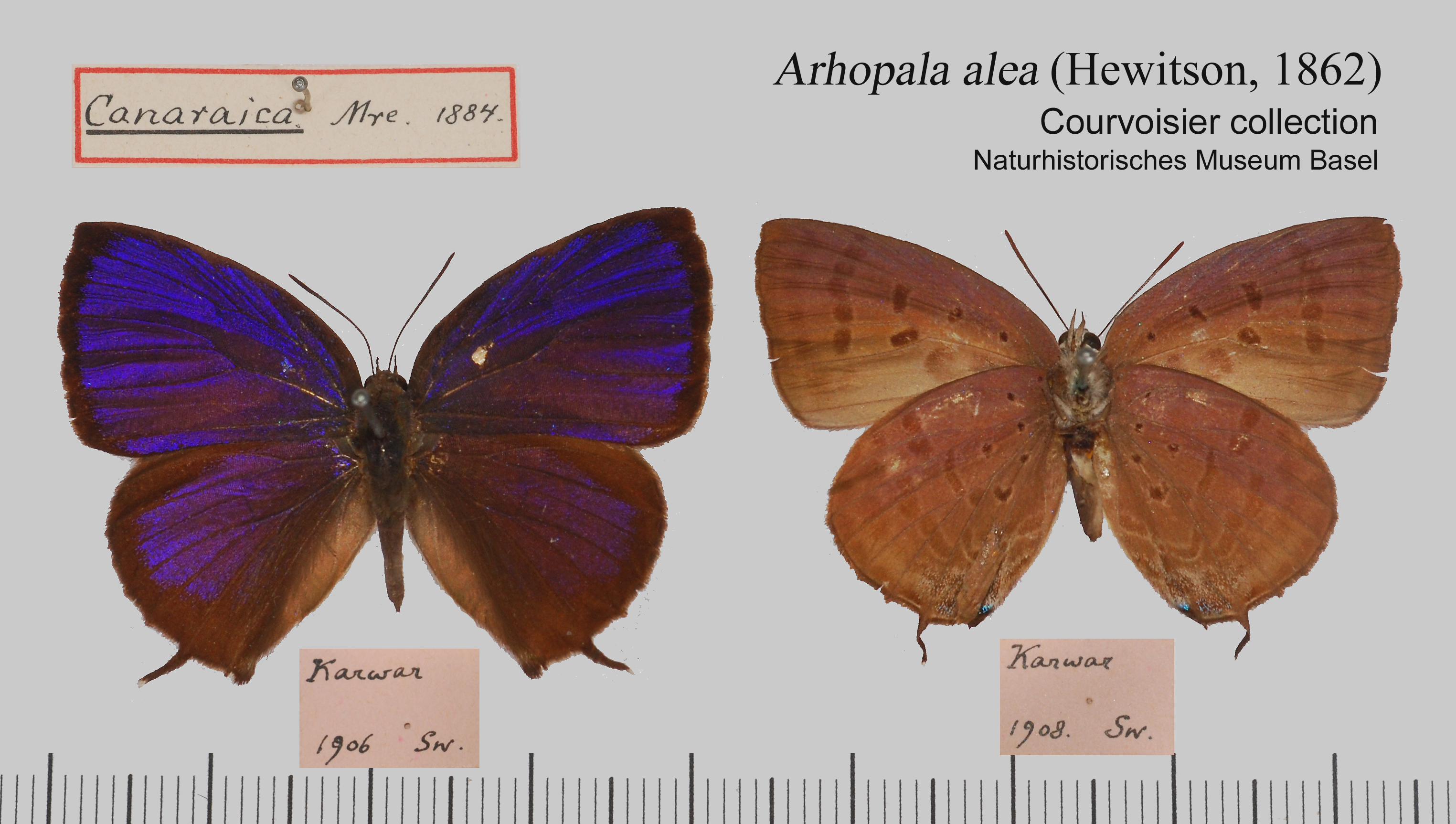

Scientific classification
- Kingdom: Animalia
- Phylum: Arthropoda
- Clade: Pancrustacea
- Class: Insecta
- Order: Lepidoptera
- Family: Lycaenidae
- Genus: Arhopala
- Species: A. alea

Binomial name
- Arhopala alea (Hewitson, 1862)
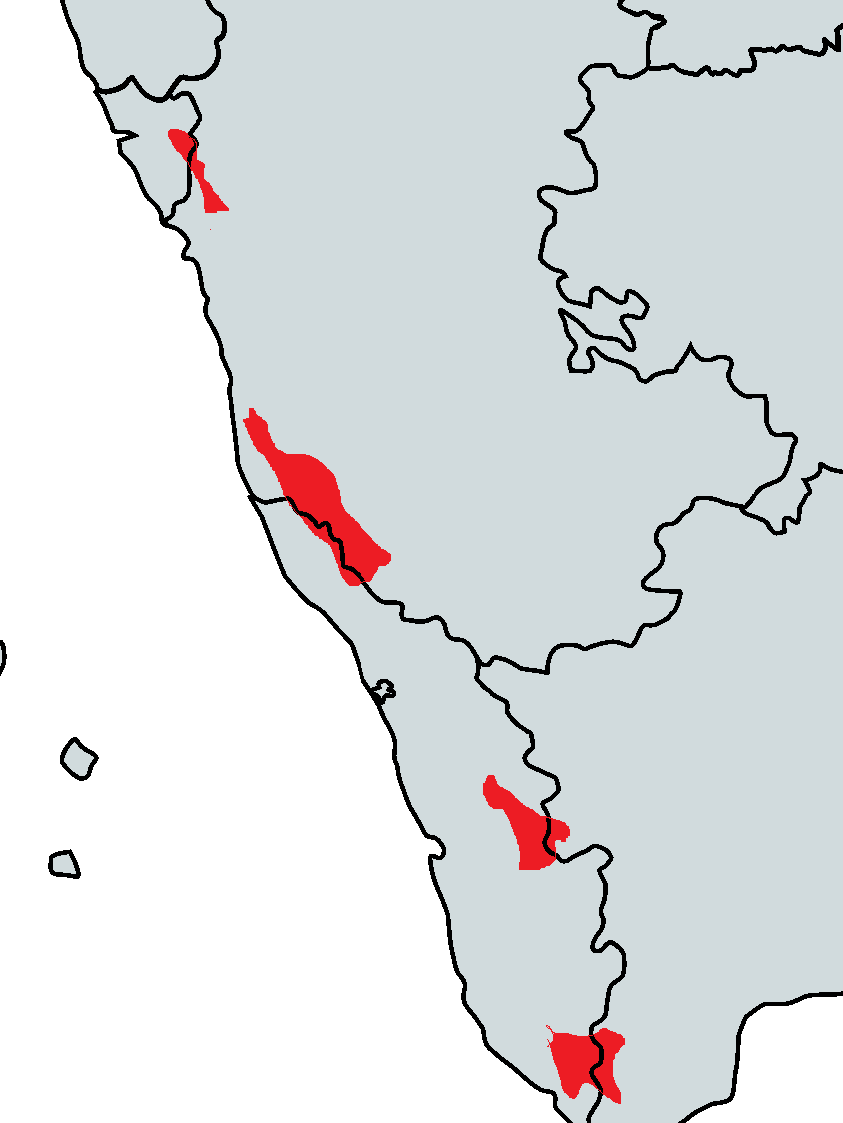

Synonyms
- Amblypodia alea Hewitson, 1862; Panchala alea (Hewitson, 1862)

= Arhopala alea =

Rosy oakblue

Species of butterfly

Arhopala alea, the Kanara oakblue or rosy oakblue, is a species of lycaenid or blue butterfly. It is endemic to India. The species was first described by William Chapman Hewitson in 1862.

== Description ==
Male. Upperside, both wings violet-blue. Forewing with the outer margin rather broad. Hindwing with the margins as broad as in the females of other species. Underside, both wings brown tinted with lilac. Forewing with the transverse band long and narrow, slightly curved. Hindwing with the band broken, ill-defined; the anal angle irrorated with white.

— Hewitson, Specimen of a Catalogue of Lycaenidae in the British Museum
