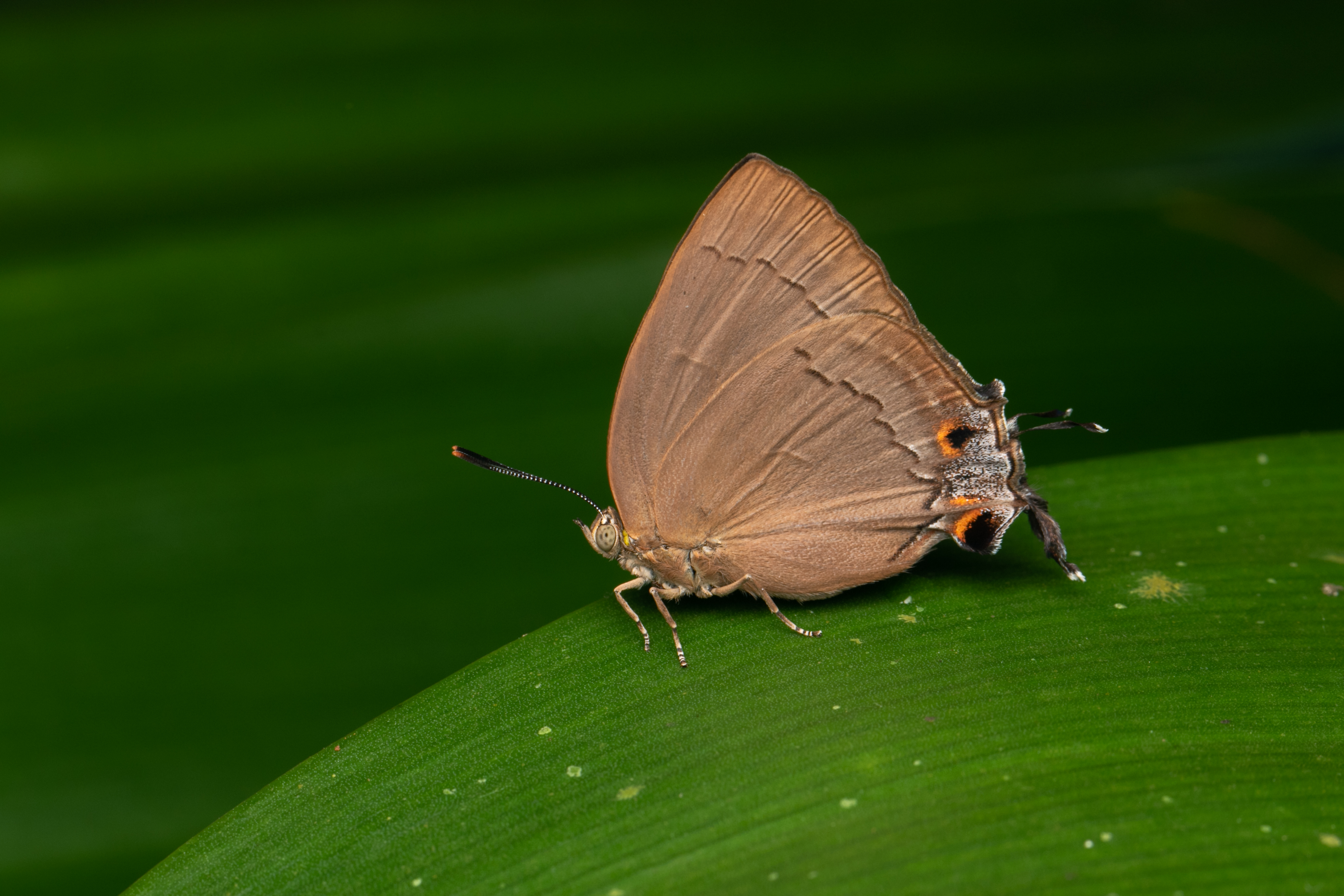
- From north India
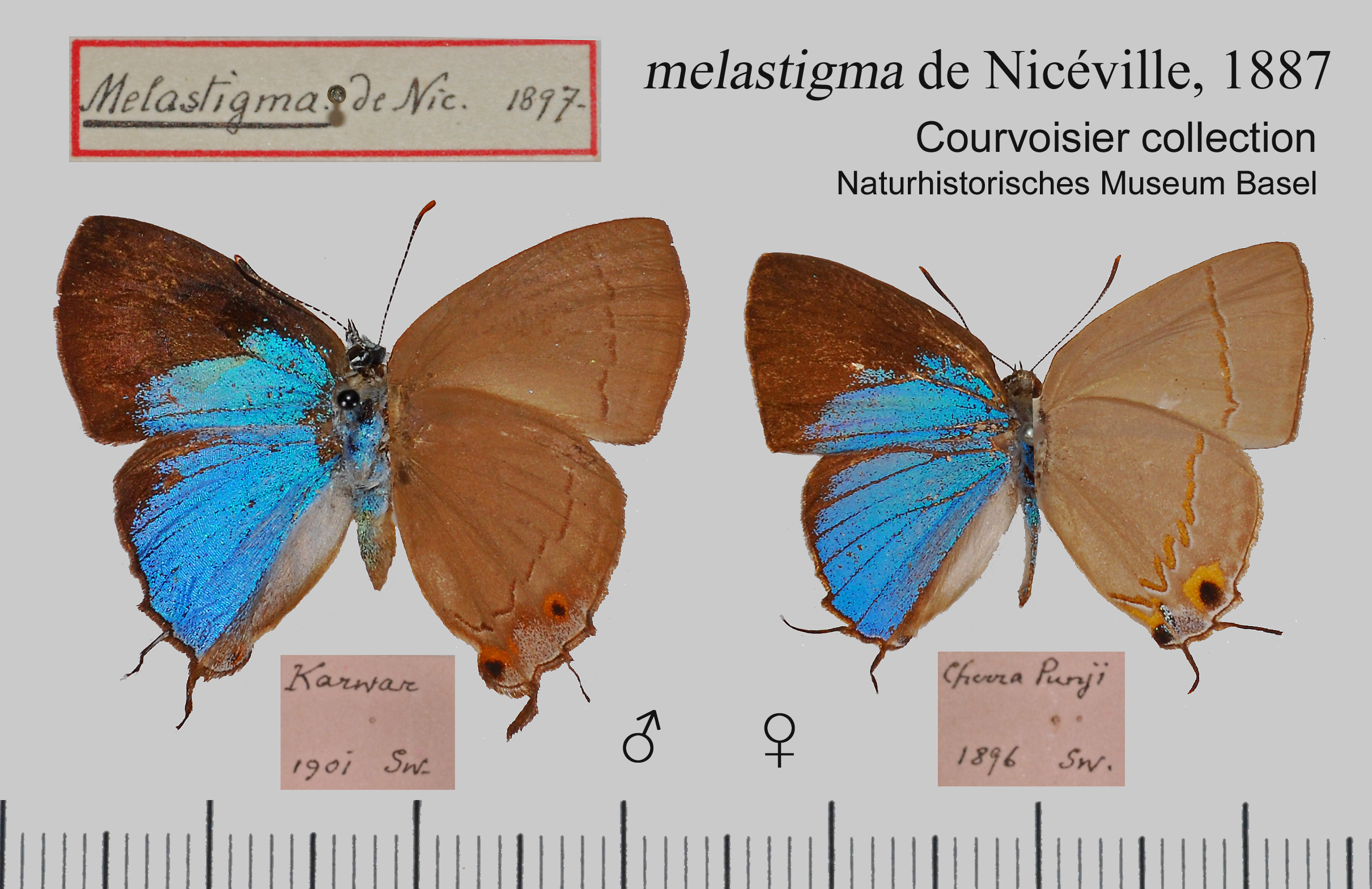
- From the Courvoisier Collection, Basel, Switzerland

Scientific classification
- Domain: Eukaryota
- Kingdom: Animalia
- Phylum: Arthropoda
- Class: Insecta
- Order: Lepidoptera
- Family: Lycaenidae
- Genus: Tajuria
- Species: T. melastigma

Binomial name
- Tajuria melastigma de Nicéville, 1887

Synonyms
- Ops melastigma (de Nicéville, 1887)

= Tajuria melastigma =

Species of butterfly

Tajuria melastigma, the branded royal, is a species of lycaenid or blue butterfly found in the Indomalayan realm (in India, Assam, Burma, Thailand).

== Description ==
Male. Upperside cerulean-blue, of a very bright and beautiful shade of colour. Forewing with a large quadrate shining sexual mark at the end of the cell, limited hindwards by vein 2, and upwards by vein 6, a black costal band, its lower edge running slightly into the cell, and heavily round the cell end, then upwards over the sexual mark and round it down to vein 2, then in a much narrower form to the hinder angle, the sexual patch in some lights has a coppery tint. Hindwing with the costal space and abdominal fold grey, a narrow black band on the outer margin which slightly thickens round the apex of the wing; anal lobe and inner tail greyish-red, outer tail black, both tipped with white. Underside dull, pale, pinkish-grey, markings darker, fine and somewhat indistinct. Forewing with a nearly straight discal line of disconnected, linear marks, one in each interspace, from above vein 6 to the sub-median nervure, the series rather closer to the outer margin than is usual. Hindwing with a similar but somewhat irregular outwardly curved series, very sinuous below its middle and bent inwards in a W-shape to the abdominal margin, both wings with indications of a sub-marginal series; anal lobe with a dull red spot, crowned with pale orange, a smaller very indistinct spot in the first median interspace, with some white scales in the interspace between them, a terminal dark line. Cilia of both wings blackish-brown. Antennae black, ringed with white, club with a red tip; frons red; head and body above and below concolorous with the wings. Female. Upperside of a duller shade of blue than in the male. Forewing with the black borders broader, and, in consequence of the absence of the sex mark, more even. Hindwing with the costal and outer marginal bands rather broad and of a dull blackish-brown. Underside as in the male.

— Charles Swinhoe, Lepidoptera Indica. Vol. IX
