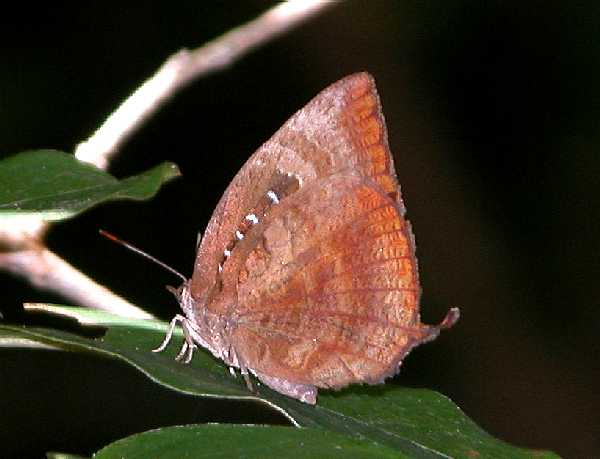

Scientific classification
- Kingdom: Animalia
- Phylum: Arthropoda
- Clade: Pancrustacea
- Class: Insecta
- Order: Lepidoptera
- Family: Lycaenidae
- Genus: Arhopala
- Species: A. centaurus

Binomial name
- Arhopala centaurus (Fabricius, 1775)

Synonyms
- Amblypodia centaurus (Fabricius, 1775); Nilasera centaurus (Fabricius, 1775); Papilio centaurus Fabricius, 1775

= Arhopala centaurus =

Centaur oakblue

Species of butterfly

Arhopala centaurus, the centaur oakblue or dull oakblue, is a species of lycaenid or blue butterfly found in India and southeast Asia to the Philippines.

== Description ==
Male. Upperside very dark blue with a violaceous tint, with black outer marginal fine border and black cilia, a rather broad black tail at the end of vein 2, a slight angular, black projection at the end of vein 1, abdominal space pale. Underside. Forewing with the basal half above the median vein dark violet-brown, the outer portion above that vein somewhat paler, the lower portion of the wing pale ochreous brown; a large round spot inside the cell near the base, a large bar in the middle, and another, larger still, at the end, very slightly darker than the ground colour, formed by their very prominent pale blue edgings, a small pale ringed spot on the costa, above the outer bar, an oblique angled spot below it on its inner side, a round spot below the middle bar, both edged with pale blue, a discal band of large conjoined more or less square spots increasing in size hindwards to vein 2, where it is joined on its inner edge to a large square spot in the next interspace, all edged on both sides with whitish; a sub-terminal series of pale brown, somewhat indistinct spots and some terminal brown suffusion. Hindwing uniformly ochreous-brown with a violet tint, all the brown markings (which are somewhat darker than the ground colour) edged with pale whitish, three spots near the base in a straight row, followed by two in a row, with three small spots in a curve towards the abdominal margin; two large square spots joined together from the middle of the costa, and the rest of the wing covered with five bands of disconnected spots at equal distances apart, the sub-terminal series having the three spots near the anal angle black, capped with metallic blue-green scales, edged outwardly by a fine white line.

Female. Upperside paler than the male and more violaceous-blue. Forewing with a very broad, inconspicuous black costal border, and with the outer margin also blackish, but to a lesser extent. Underside as in the male, but paler. Antennge black; palpi black, white beneath; head and body concolorous with the wings above and below.

— Charles Swinhoe, Lepidoptera Indica. Vol. VIII

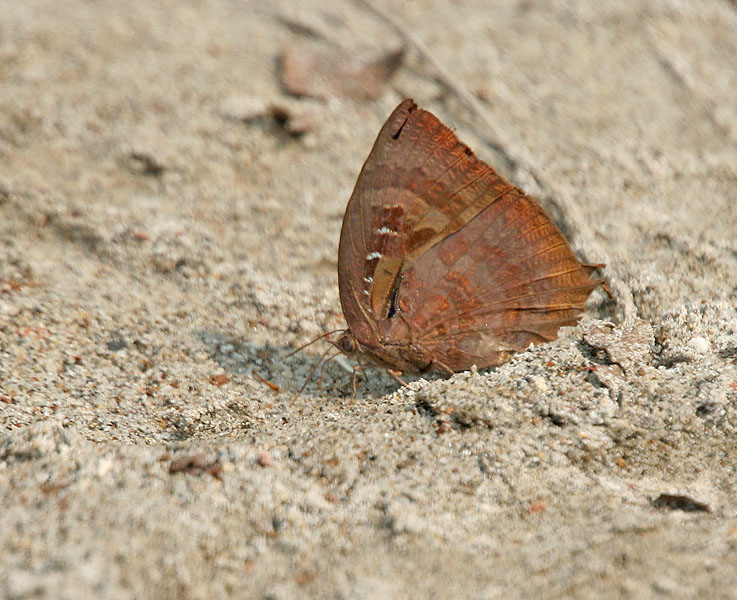
At Jayanti in Buxa Tiger Reserve in Jalpaiguri district of West Bengal, India

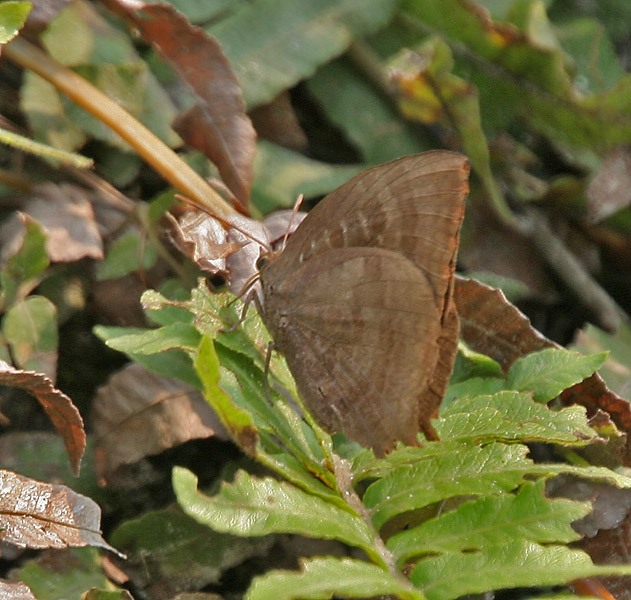
At Jayanti

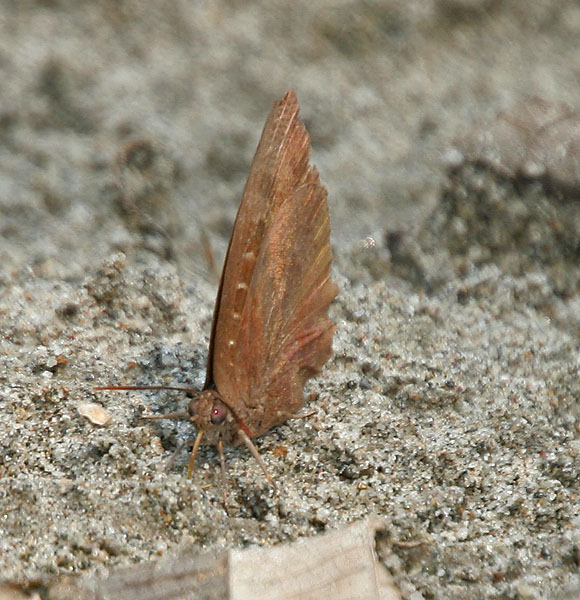
At Jayanti

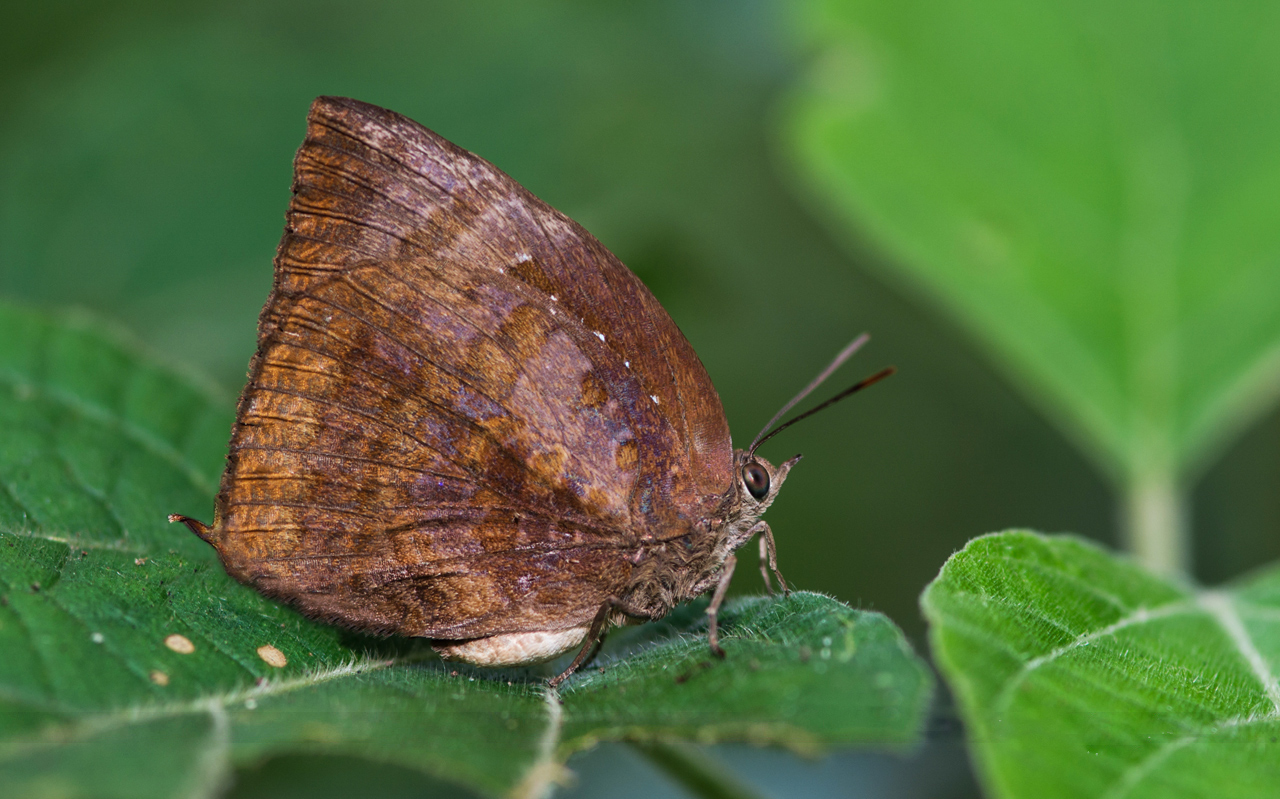
In Kerala, India

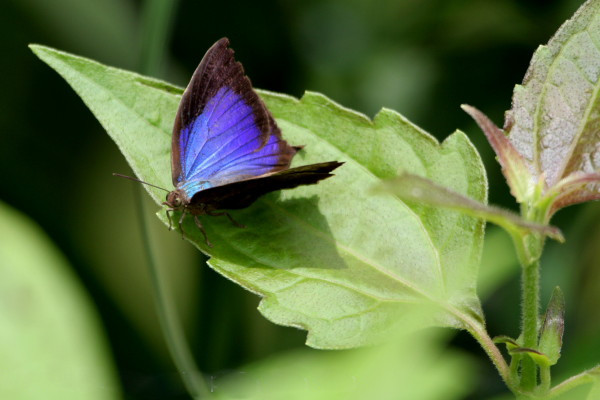

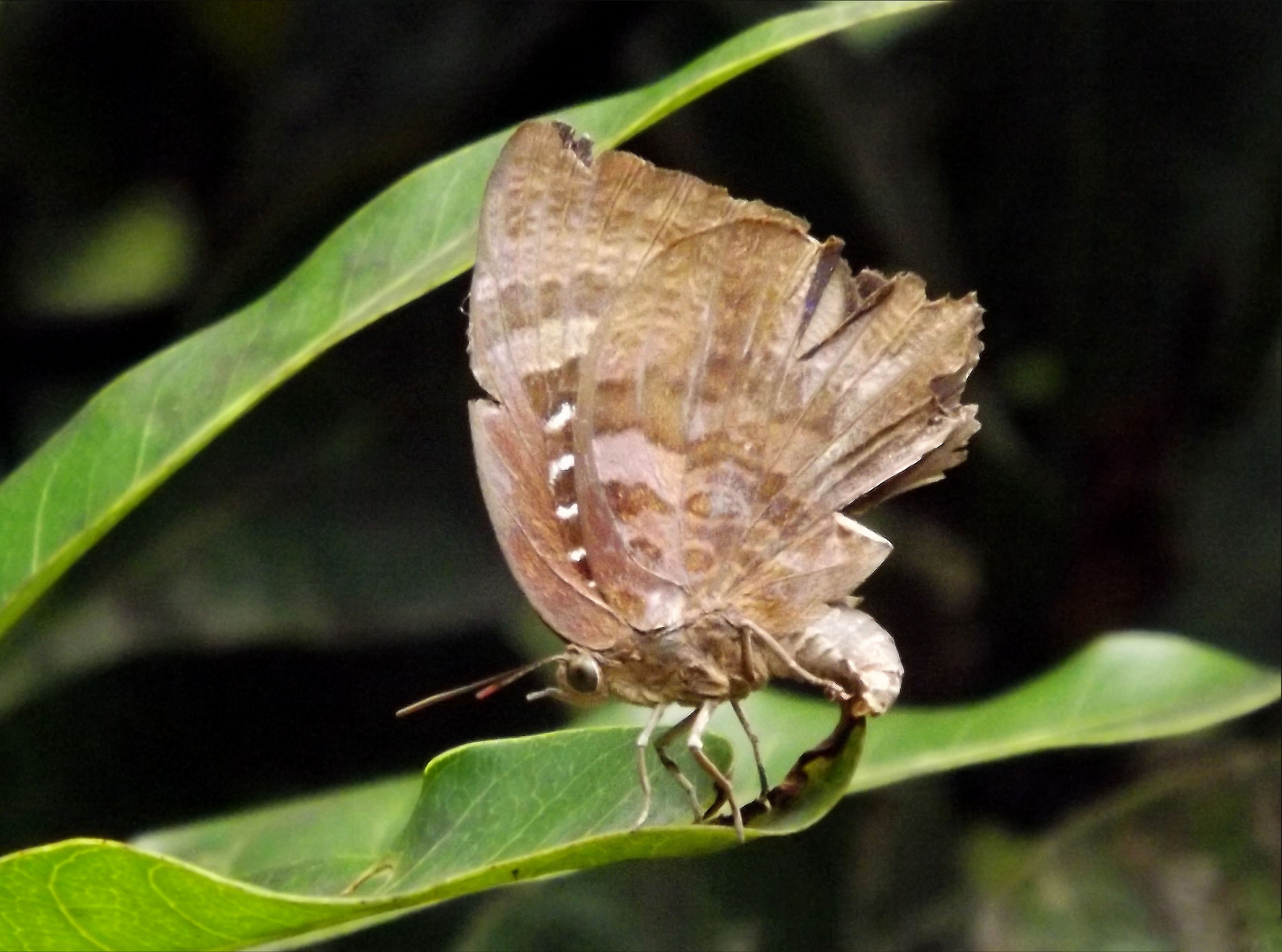
female laying eggs

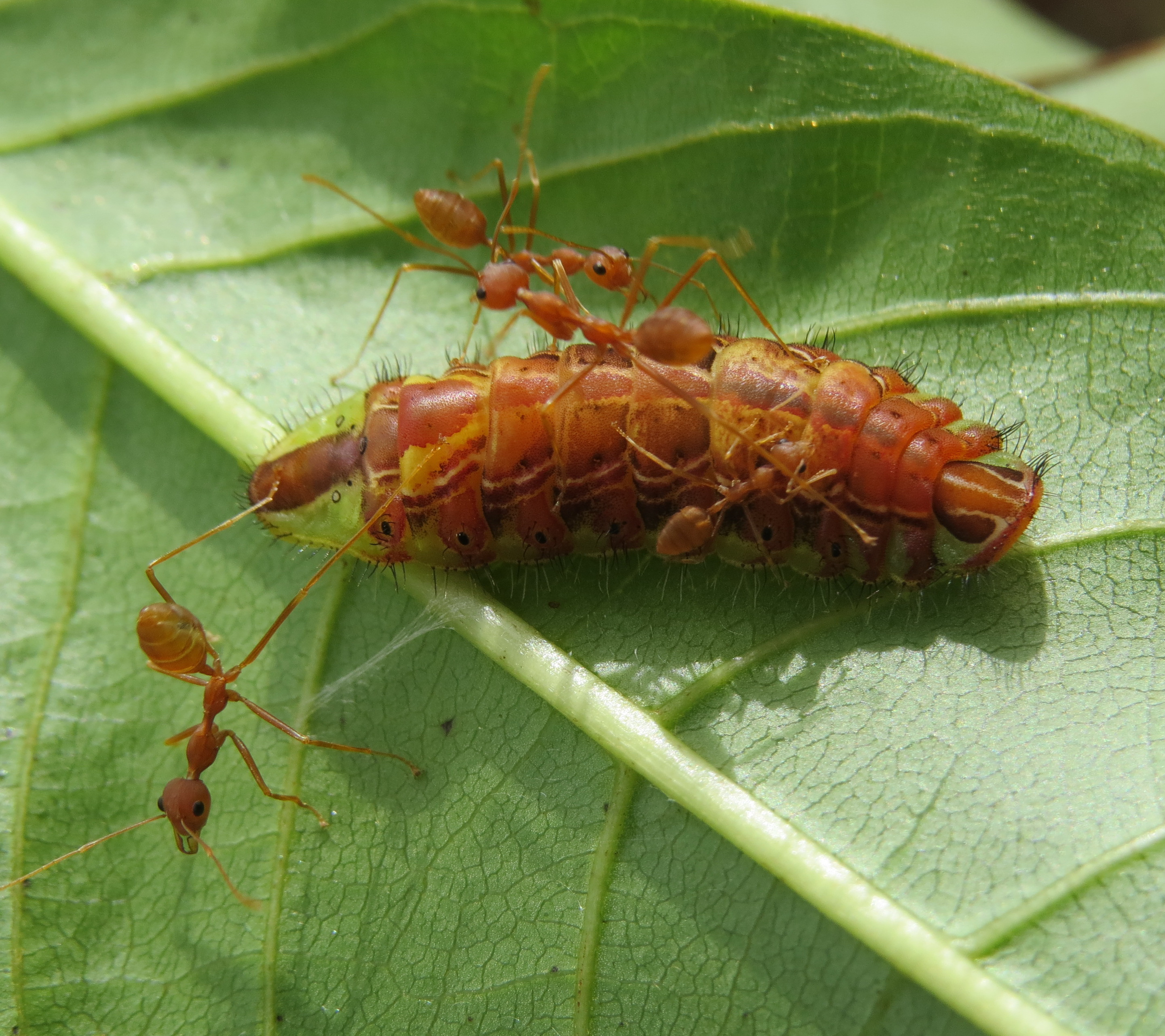
caterpillar with ants

== Subspecies ==
- A. c. centaurus Kangean, Java, Bali, Lombok, Sumbawa, Sumatra, mainland New Guinea, Torres Strait islands, northern Australia (QLD), Moa Is.
- A. c. asopus Waterhouse & Lyell, [1914] northern & northwestern Australia (NT), Koolan Is.
- A. c. nakula (C. & R. Felder, 1860) Thailand, Laos, Vietnam, Hainan, S.Yunnan, Malay Peninsula, Singapore, Borneo, Singkep, Sumatra, Belitung, Bangka
- A. c. aglais C. & R. Felder, [1865] Philippines (Luzon, Mindoro, Mindanao)
- A. c. coruscans Wood-Mason & de Nicéville, 1881 Andamans
- A. c. pirama (Moore, [1881]) Ceylon, South India
- A. c. pirithous ( Moore, [1884]) North India, Assam, Sikkim, S.China, Hainan
- A. c. centenitus Fruhstorfer, 1914 Batu, Pagi
- A. c. dixoni Eliot, 1978 Malaysia
- A. c. cuyoensis Schröder & Treadaway, 1999 Philippines (Cuyo)
- A. c. babuyana Schröder & Treadaway, 1999 Philippines (Babuyanes)
- A. c. decimarie Schröder & Treadaway, 1999 Philippines (Homonhon)
- A. c. dinacola Schröder & Treadaway, 1999 Philippines (Dinagat)

== Biology ==
The larva feeds on Terminalia tomentosa, Terminalia paniculata, Lagerstroemia microcarpa, Mangifera indica and Xylia dolabriformis
