= List of butterflies of Gujarat =

Gujarat is a state in the western part of India. It has very rich butterfly diversity as it is situated at the geographical meeting point of many types of habitats. Northern Gujarat meets the deserts and semi-arid parts of Pakistan, Saurashtra peninsula has dry scrublands and savannah habitats, Gir has dry deciduous forests, central Gujarat has wetlands and scrublands while south Gujarat touches the Western Ghats and hence it has evergreen and bamboo forests.

According to Butterflies of Gujarat, there are over 193 butterfly species found in Gujarat. Total 79 of them are seen in South Gujarat.

Gujarat has six families of butterflies:

- Papilionidae
- Pieridae
- Nymphalidae
- Lycaenidae
- Hesperiidae
- Riodinidae

== Papilionidae ==
- Graphium agamemnon - tailed jay Linnaeus, 1758
- Graphium doson - common jay Felder & Felder, 1864
- Graphium nomius - spot swordtail Esper, 1785
- Papilio demoleus - lime swallowtail Linnaeus, 1758
- Papilio polymnestor - blue Mormon Cramer, 1775
- Papilio polytes - common Mormon Linnaeus, 1758
- Pachliopta aristolochiae - common rose Fabricius, 1775
- Pachliopta hector - crimson rose
- Papilio helenus - red Helen

== Pieridae ==
- Catopsilia pomona - lemon emigrant Fabricius, 1775
- Catopsilia pyranthe - mottled emigrant Linnaeus, 1758
- Eurema hecabe - common grass yellow Linnaeus, 1758
- Eurema laeta - spotless grass yellow Boisduval, 1836
- Eurema brigitta - small grass yellow
- Leptosia nina - Psyche Fabricius, 1793
- Pareronia hippia - Indian wanderer Fabricius, 1787
- Appias libythea - western striped albatross Fabricius, 1775
- Belenois aurota - pioneer Fabricius, 1793
- Cepora nerissa - common gull Fabricius, 1775
- Delias eucharis - Indian Jezebel Drury, 1773
- Colotis amata - small salmon Arab Fabricius, 1775
- Colotis aurora - plain orange-tip
- Colotis danae - crimson-tip
- Colotis etrida - little orange-tip
- Colotis fausta - large salmon Arab
- Colotis protractus - blue-spotted Arab
- Colotis vestalis - white Arab
- Ixias marianne - white orange-tip
- Ixias pyrene - yellow orange-tip

== Nymphalidae ==
- Ariadne ariadne - angled castor
- Ariadne merione - common castor
- Byblia ilithyia - Joker
- Polyura athamas – common nawab
- Polyura agrarius – anomalous nawab
- Charaxes psaphon - plain tawny rajah
- Charaxes solon - black rajah
- Danaus chrysippus - plain tiger
- Danaus genutia - striped tiger
- Euploea core - common crow
- Euploea klugii - brown king crow
- Tirumala limniace - blue tiger
- Parantica aglea - glassy tiger
- Acraea terpsicore - tawny coster
- Phalanta phalantha - common leopard
- Euthalia aconthea - baron
- Euthalia lubentina - gaudy baron
- Euthalia nais - baronet
- Neptis hylas - common sailer
- Phaedyma columella - short-banded sailer
- Moduza procris - commander
- Hypolimnas bolina - great eggfly
- Hypolimnas misippus - Danaid eggfly
- Junonia almana - peacock pansy
- Junonia atlites - grey pansy
- Junonia hierta - yellow pansy
- Junonia iphita - chocolate pansy
- Junonia lemonias - lemon pansy
- Junonia orithya - blue pansy
- Argynis hyperbius - Indian fritillary
- Kallima horsfieldii - Sahyadri blue oakleaf
- Vanessa cardui - painted lady
- Melanitis leda - common evening brown
- Mycalesis perseus - common bushbrown
- Ypthima asterope - common three-ring
- Ypthima huebneri - common four-ring
- Ypthima baldus - common five-ring
- Lethe europa - bamboo treebrown

== Lycaenidae ==
- Curetis thetis - Indian sunbeam
- Curetis acuta – angled sunbeam
- Spalgis epius - apefly
- Acytolepis puspa - common hedge blue
- Azanus jesous - African babul blue
- Azanus ubaldus - bright babul blue
- Caleta decidia - angled Pierrot
- Castalius rosimon - common Pierrot
- Megisba malaya - Malayan
- Talicada nyseus - red Pierrot
- Catochrysops strabo - forget-me-not
- Anthene lycaenina - pointed ciliate blue
- Chilades lajus - lime blue
- Chilades parrhasius - small Cupid
- Luthrodes pandava - plains Cupid
- Everes lacturnus - Indian Cupid
- Euchrysops cnejus - gram blue
- Freyeria putli - Oriental grass jewel
- Freyeria trochylus - orange-spotted grass jewel
- Jamides celeno - common cerulean
- Jamides bochus - dark cerulean
- Lampides boeticus - pea blue
- Leptotes plinius - zebra blue
- Prosotas dubiosa - tailless lineblue
- Prosotas nora - common lineblue
- Petrelaea dana - dingy lineblue
- Tarucus nara - striped Pierrot
- Tarucus balkanicus - little tiger Pierrot (Balkan Pierrot)
- Tarucus indica - Indian Pierrot
- Zizeeria karsandra - dark grass blue
- Pseudozizeeria maha - pale grass blue
- Zizina otis - lesser grass blue
- Zizula hylax - tiny grass blue
- Cigaritis ictis - common shot silverline
- Cigaritis vulcanus - common silverline
- Cigaritis schistacea - plumbeous silverline
- Cigaritis acamas - tawny silverline
- Arhopala amantes - large oakblue
- Rapala iarbus - common red flash
- Virachola isocrates - common guava blue
- Rathinda amor - monkey puzzle
- Tajuria cippus - peacock royal
- Tajuria jehana - plains blue royal

== Riodinidae ==
- Abisara bifasciata - double-banded Judy

== Gallery ==
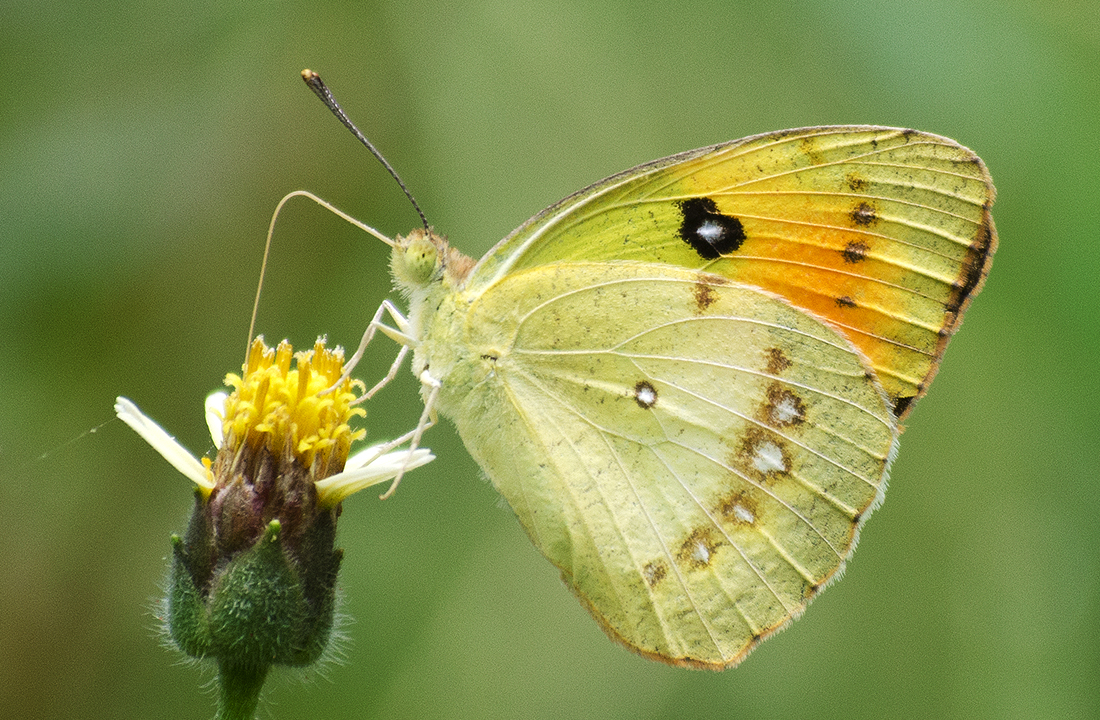
White orange-tip (Ixias marianne) on Tridax flower

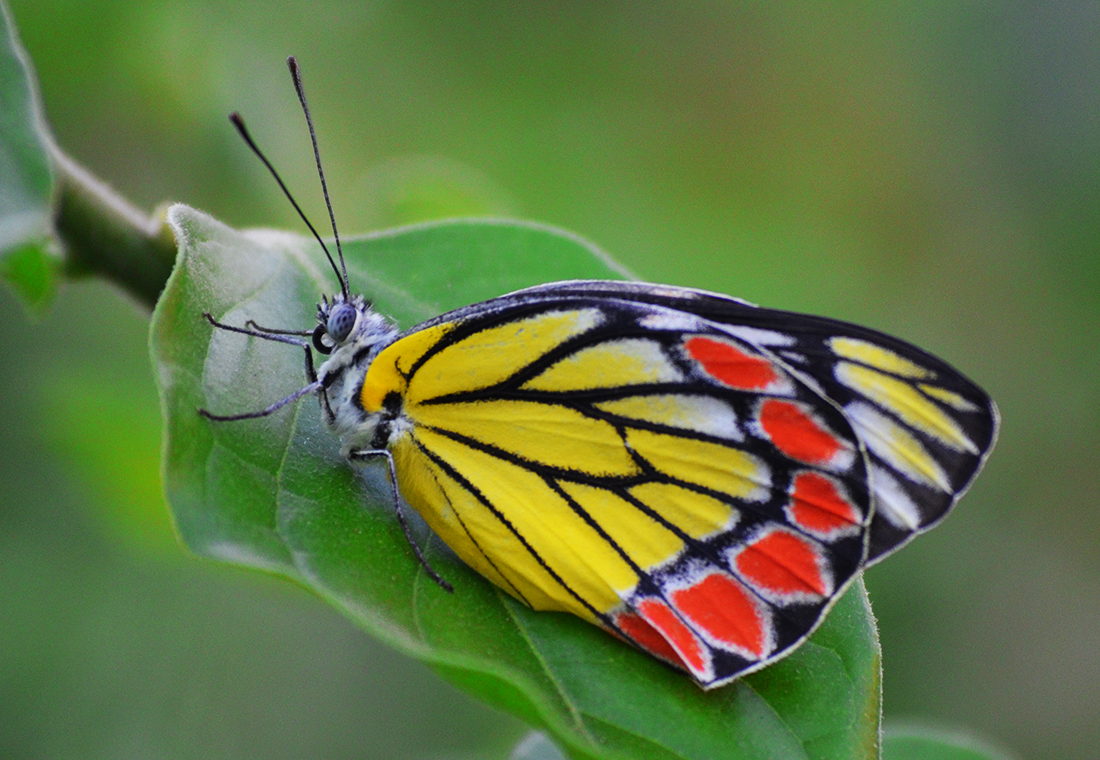
Indian Jezebel (Delias eucharis) in Gandhinagar

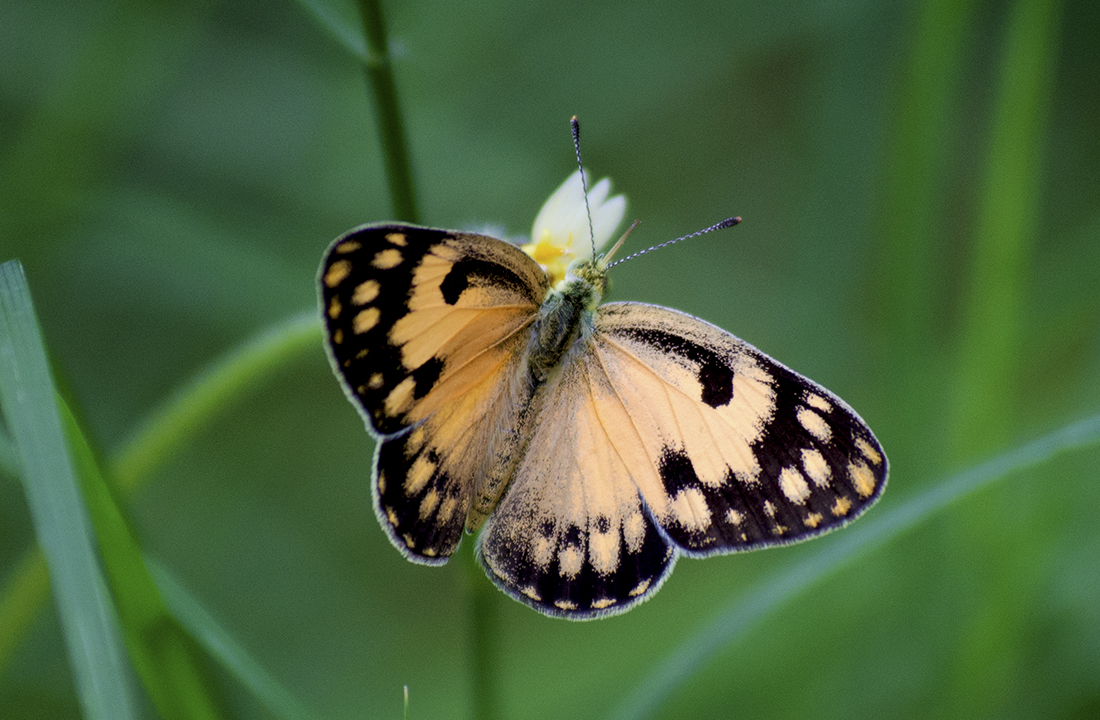
Small salmon Arab (Colotis amata)

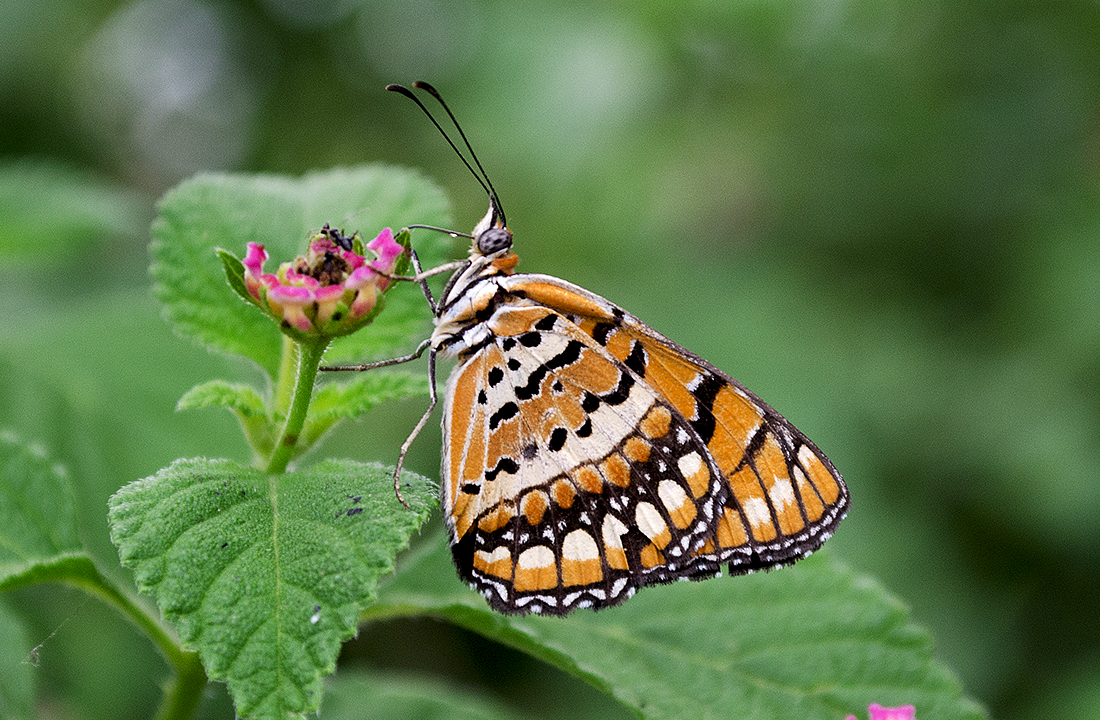
Joker (Byblia ilithyia) near Rajkot

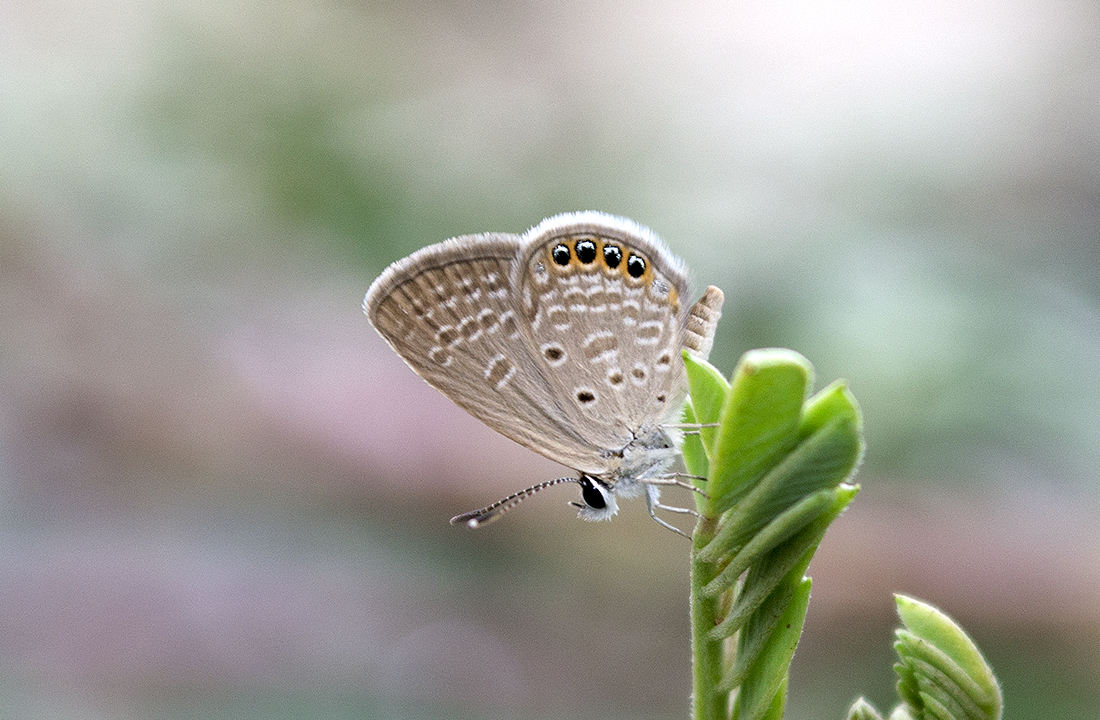
Oriental grass jewel (Freyeria putli) in Gandhinagar

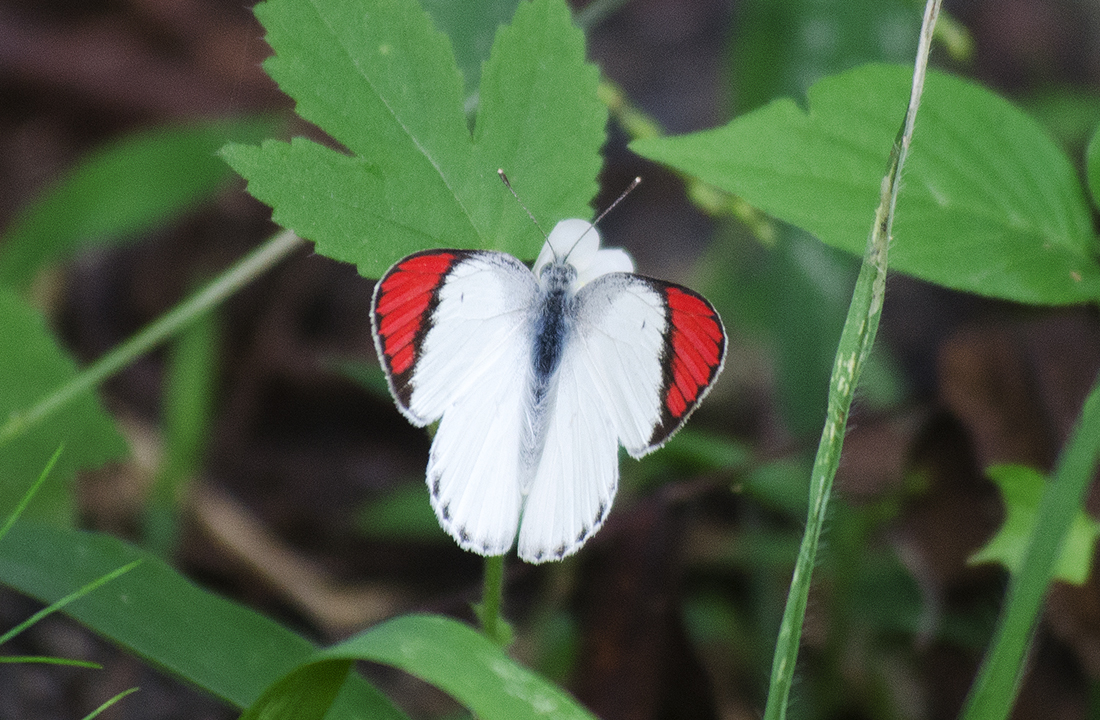
Crimson-tip (Colotis danae) in Hingolgadh Nature Education Sanctuary, Rajkot

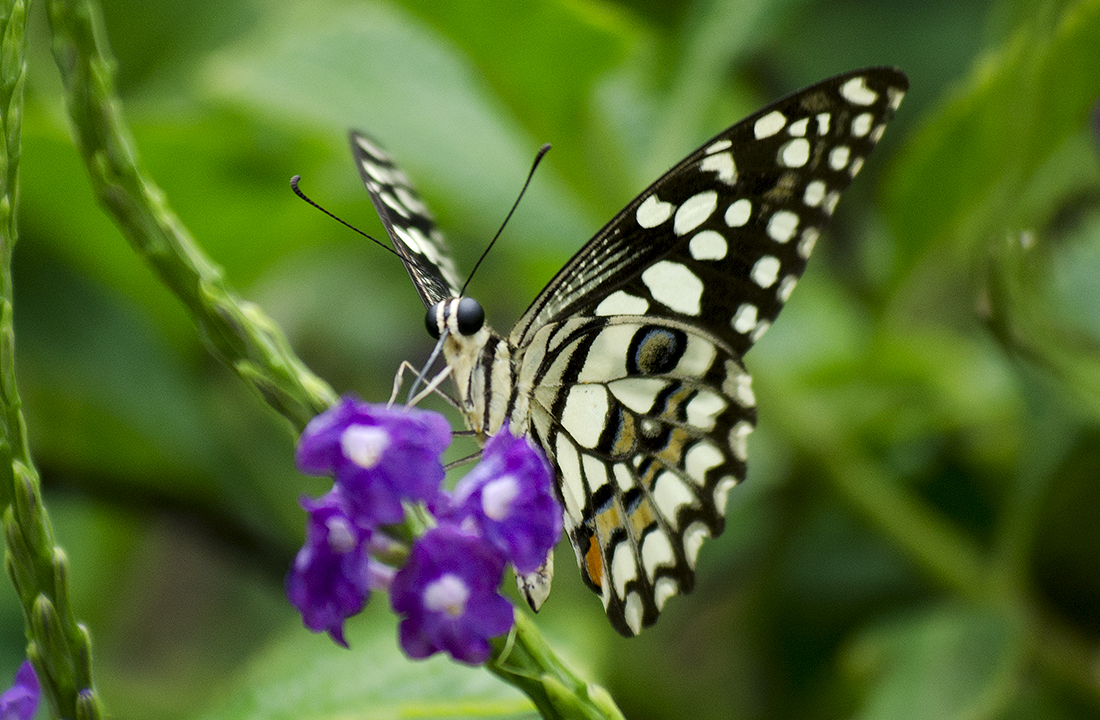
Lime swallowtail (Papilio demoleus) on snakeweed flowers
