= List of butterflies of Odisha =

This is a tentative list of butterflies found in Odisha, a state in India.

== Family Lycaenidae ==
- Common Pierrot (Castalius rosimon)
- Rounded Pierrot (Tarucus extricatus) Butler, 1886

== Family Nymphalidae ==
- Tawny coaster (Acraea terpsicore) Linnaeus, 1758
- Plain tiger (Danaus chrysippus) Linnaeus, 1758
- White tiger (Danaus melanippus) Cramer, 1777
- Common crow (Euploea core) Cramer, 1780
- Peacock pansy (Junonia almana) Linnaeus, 1758
- Yellow pansy (Junonia hierta)
- Blue pansy (Junonia orithya) Linnaeus, 1758
- Common leopard (Phalanta phalantha) Drury, 1773

== Family Pieridae ==
- Mottled emigrant (Catopsilia pyranthe) Linnaeus, 1758
- White Arab (Colotis vestalis) Butler, 1876
- Common grass yellow (Eurema hecabe) Linnaeus, 1758
- Cabbage white (Pieris rapae) (Linnaeus, 1758)

== Family Papilionidae ==
- Crimson rose (Pachliopta hector) (Linnaeus, 1758)

== See also ==
- Butterfly
- List of butterflies of India
- Fauna of India
- Flora of India
