= T. nigra =

T. nigra may refer to:

- Tandonia nigra, an air-breathing land slug species
- Tarucus nigra, a small butterfly species found in India
- Tetraponera nigra, an ant species
- Trithemis nigra, a dragonfly species

== See also ==
- Nigra (disambiguation)
