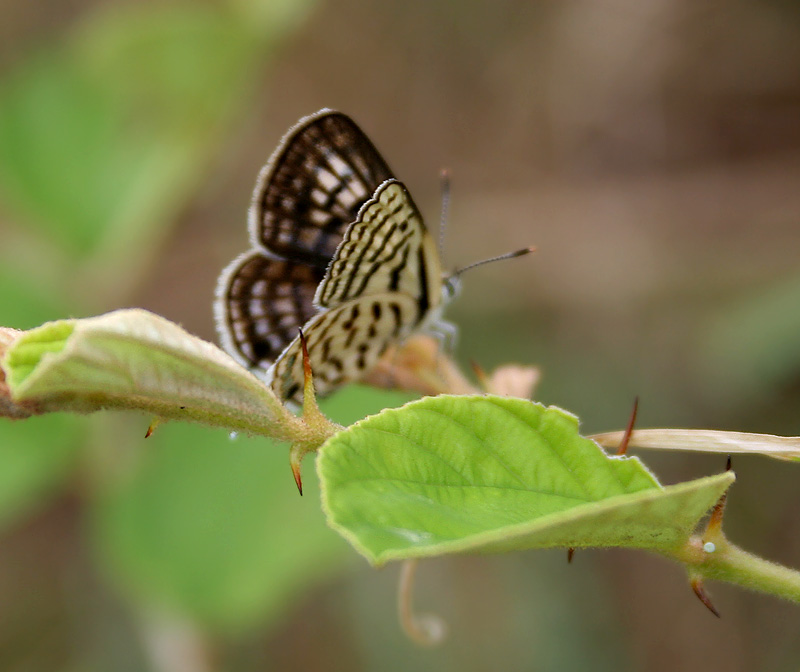
- Rounded Pierrot (Tarucus nara) female on a Ziziphus species

Scientific classification
- Kingdom: Animalia
- Phylum: Arthropoda
- Clade: Pancrustacea
- Class: Insecta
- Order: Lepidoptera
- Family: Lycaenidae
- Subfamily: Polyommatinae
- Tribe: Polyommatini
- Genus: Tarucus; Moore, 1881

Type species
- Hesperia theophrastus Fabricius, 1793

Diversity
- About 20 species (but see text)

= Tarucus =

Butterfly genus in family Lycaenidae

Tarucus is a butterfly genus in the family Lycaenidae. They are commonly known as blue Pierrots or simply Pierrots. The latter name is often used for the closely related genus Castalius. The delimitation of Castalius versus Tarucus is not yet fully resolved, with some species, such as the dark Pierrot (T. ananda), having been moved between the two genera repeatedly. It may even be that they are eventually regarded as synonymous, and in that case the older name Castalius would supersede Tarucus by the Principle of Priority.

Several species formerly in Tarucus were moved to Leptotes, another closely related lineage (though not quite as close as Castalius).

The caterpillars of this genus typically feed on Ziziphus and are attended by ants.

== Species ==
The genus can be divided in two distinct groups. These are generally separated geographically, but some taxa (such as the black-spotted Pierrot, T. balkanicus nigra), though assigned to one group, occur in the range of the other. Consequently, it is not quite clear whether the groups are clades or merely convenient but paraphyletic assemblages:

Afrotropical group:

- Tarucus balkanicus – Balkan Pierrot, little tiger blue
  - Tarucus balkanicus nigra – black-spotted Pierrot
- Tarucus bowkeri (Trimen, 1883) – Bowker's blue
- Tarucus grammicus (Grose-Smith & Kirby, 1893) – black Pierrot
- Tarucus kiki Larsen, 1976 – Kiki's Pierrot
- Tarucus kulala Evans, 1955 – Turkana Pierrot
- Tarucus legrasi Stempffer, 1944 – Le Gras' Pierrot
- Tarucus quadratus Ogilvie-Grant, 1899
- Tarucus rosacea (Austaut, 1885) – Mediterranean tiger blue, Mediterranean Pierrot
- Tarucus sybaris (Hopffer, 1855) – Dotted blue
- Tarucus theophrastus – pointed Pierrot, African Pierrot, common tiger blue
- Tarucus thespis (Linnaeus, 1764) – Vivid blue
- Tarucus ungemachi Stempffer, 1944 – Ungemach's Pierrot

South Asian group:

- Tarucus ananda – dark Pierrot
- Tarucus callinara – spotted Pierrot
- Tarucus indica – Indian Pierrot
- Tarucus nara – striped Pierrot
- Tarucus venosus – veined Pierrot, Himalayan Pierrot
- Tarucus waterstradti Druce, 1895
  - Tarucus waterstradti dharta – Assam Pierrot

Others:

- Tarucus alteratus
- Tarucus extricatus
