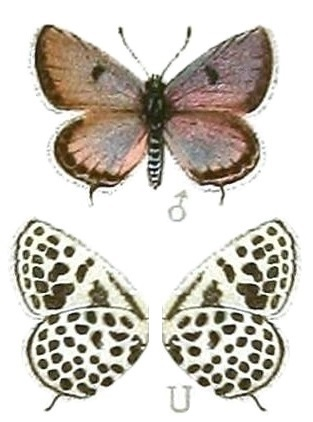

Scientific classification
- Domain: Eukaryota
- Kingdom: Animalia
- Phylum: Arthropoda
- Class: Insecta
- Order: Lepidoptera
- Family: Lycaenidae
- Genus: Tarucus
- Species: T. sybaris

Binomial name
- Tarucus sybaris (Hopffer, 1855)

Synonyms
- Lycaena sybaris Hopffer, 1855; Cupido linearis Aurivillius, 1925; Tarucus sybaris f. vreuricki Dufrane, 1954

= Tarucus sybaris =

Dotted blue

Species of butterfly

Tarucus sybaris, the dotted blue, is a butterfly of the family Lycaenidae. It is found in southern Africa.

The wingspan is 22–26 mm for males and 20–27 mm for females. Adults are on wing year-round, with a peak from November to March.

The larvae feed on Ziziphus species, including Z. zeyheriana and Z. mucronata.

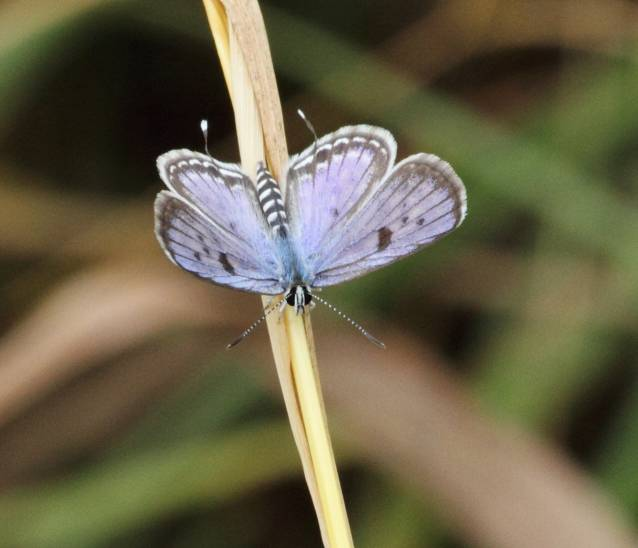
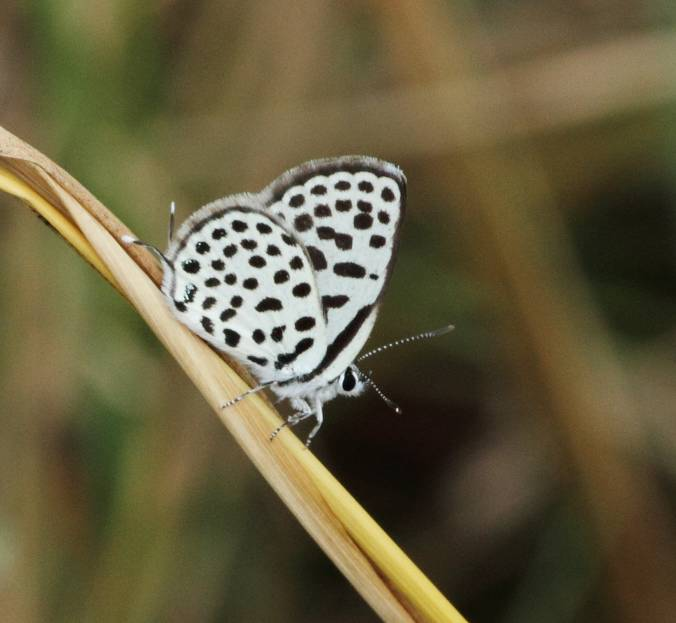
Tarucus sybaris sybaris in Spioenkop Dam N. R., South Africa

== Subspecies ==
- Tarucus sybaris sybaris – South Africa (East Cape, KwaZulu-Natal, eastern Orange Free State, Gauteng, Mpumalanga, Limpopo Province and North West Province), Mozambique, Zimbabwe, Zambia, Malawi
- Tarucus sybaris linearis (Aurivillius, 1924) – North Cape, western Orange Free State, Namibia, Angola, Botswana
