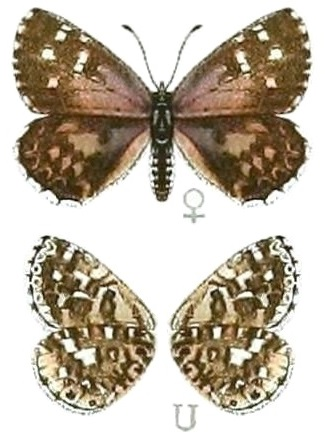

Scientific classification
- Kingdom: Animalia
- Phylum: Arthropoda
- Class: Insecta
- Order: Lepidoptera
- Family: Lycaenidae
- Genus: Tarucus
- Species: T. thespis

Binomial name
- Tarucus thespis (Linnaeus, 1764)

Synonyms
- Papilio thespis Linnaeus, 1764; Papilio pitho Linnaeus, 1764

= Tarucus thespis =

Fynbos blue

Species of butterfly

Tarucus thespis, the fynbos blue or vivid blue, is a butterfly of the family Lycaenidae. It is found in South Africa, from the Northern Cape, south to fynbos in the West Cape and east to the Amathole Mountains in the Eastern Cape.

The wingspan is 20–25 mm for males and 20–27 mm for females. Adults are on wing year-round, with peaks from September to November and from February to March.

The larvae feed on Phylica imberbis and Saxifraga species.
