= Tarucus grammicus =

Scientific classification
- Kingdom: Animalia
- Phylum: Arthropoda
- Clade: Pancrustacea
- Class: Insecta
- Order: Lepidoptera
- Family: Lycaenidae
- Genus: Tarucus
- Species: T. grammicus

Binomial name
- Tarucus grammicus (Grose-Smith & Kirby, 1893)

Synonyms
- Lycaenesthes grammicus Grose-Smith & Kirby, 1893; Tarucus louisae Sharpe, 1898

Species of butterfly

Tarucus grammicus, the dark Pierrot or black Pierrot, is a butterfly in the family Lycaenidae. It is found in Yemen, southern Ethiopia, Somalia, eastern and northern Kenya and northern Tanzania. The habitat consists of savanna.

The larvae feed on Ziziphus abysinnica.
