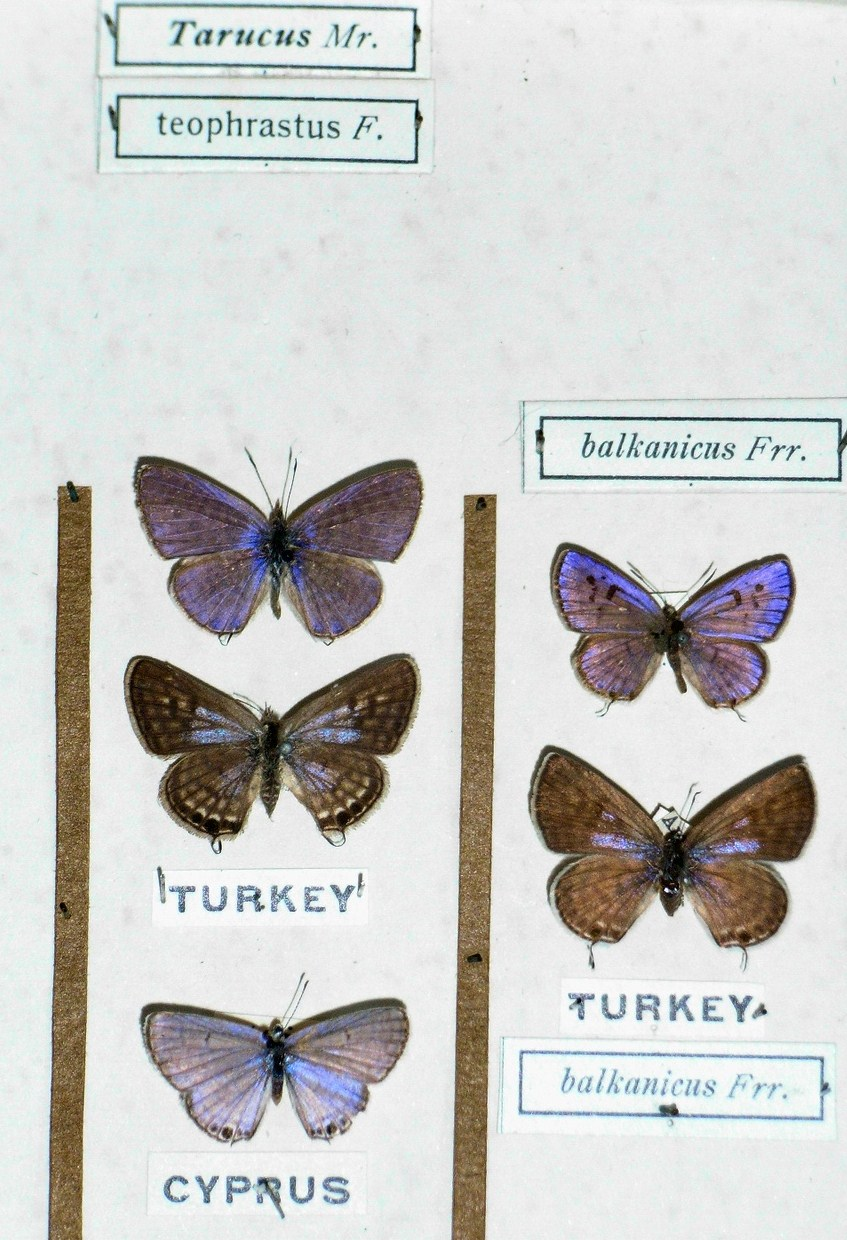
- Museum specimens

Scientific classification
- Kingdom: Animalia
- Phylum: Arthropoda
- Class: Insecta
- Order: Lepidoptera
- Family: Lycaenidae
- Genus: Tarucus
- Species: T. theophrastus

Binomial name
- Tarucus theophrastus (Fabricius, 1793)

Synonyms
- Hesperia theophrastus Fabricius, 1793

= Tarucus theophrastus =

Pointed Pierrot

Species of butterfly

Tarucus theophrastus, the common tiger blue, pointed Pierrot or African Pierrot, is a small butterfly found in the Old World tropics. It belongs to the lycaenids or blues family.

This is the type species of the genus Tarucus.

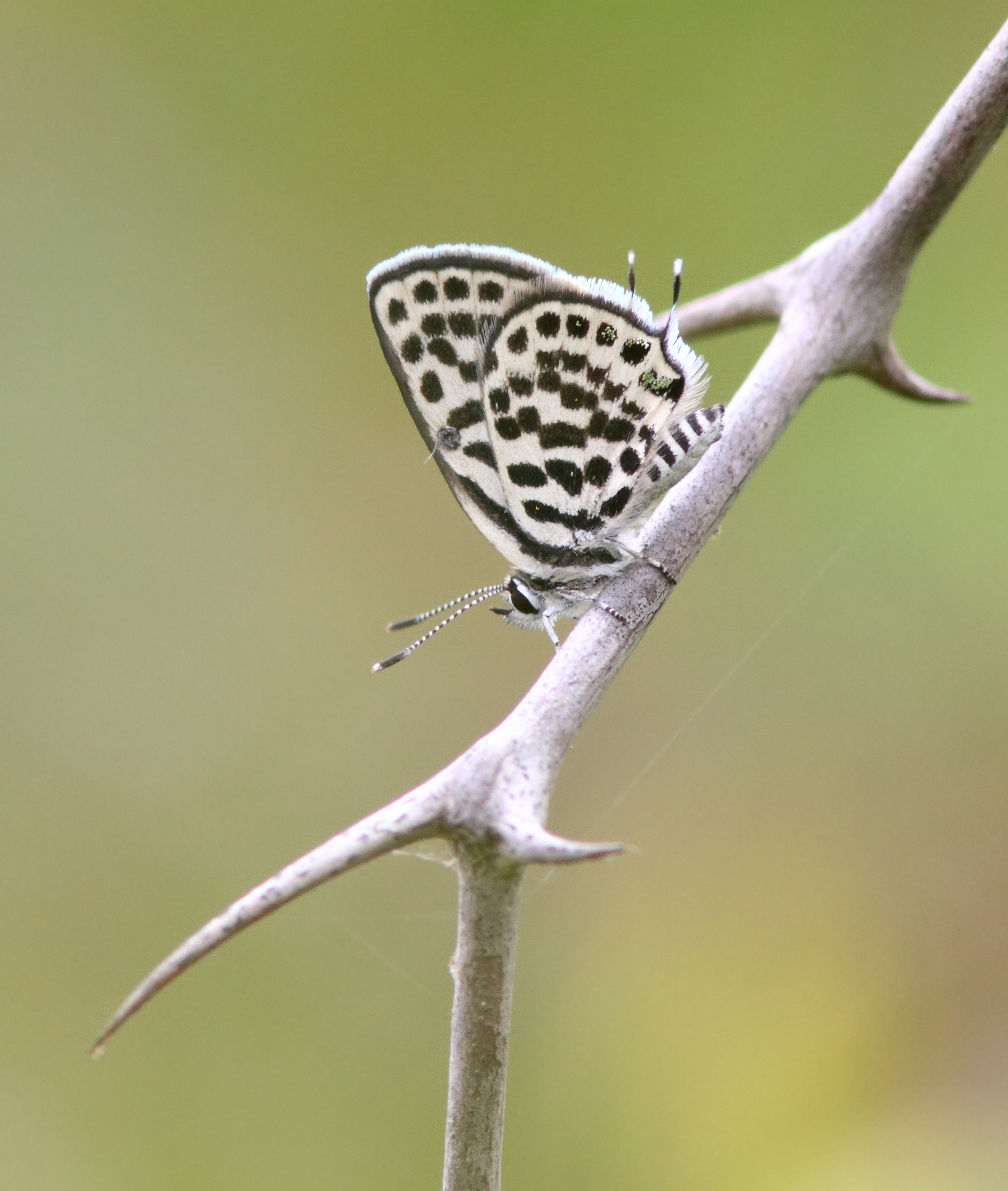
Tarucus theophrastus in southern Spain.

== Description ==
Male upperside pale purple to violet with in certain lights a blue suffusion, the markings of the underside apparent through transparency. Forewing: costal margin above vein 12 suffused strongly with blue; discocellulars with a transverse elongate blackish spot; a slender anteciliary black line. Hindwing: immaculate except for an anteciliary black line as on the forewing. Cilia of both forewings and hindwings dull sullied white with a brownish-black band along their bases. Underside: white with the following black markings: Forewing: an anteciliary line continued along the costa but not up to the base; a streak from base passing obliquely to the costa; an obliquely-placed irregular mark across the cell with a spot below it in interspace 1; a curved interrupted band beyond, that consists of a spot in interspace 9 joined to a transverse bar across the discocellulars and detached from it a spot in interspace 2 that coalesces with another in interspace 1; following this are four upper discal spots two and two placed obliquely, the lower two often coalescent, a transverse postdiscal more or less macular curved band, and a subterminal transverse series of six round equal-sized spots. Hindwing: an obliquely placed basal streak, a row of three spots across the cell, the upper two spots much elongated, a short bar on the discocellulars and an elongate, transverse, subcostal spot above it; four discal spots, the upper four placed obliquely two and two, the lower two transverse, coalescent; postdiscal band, subterminal transverse series of spots and anteciliary line as on the forewing; the postdiscal band lunular, all or some of the spots of the subterminal series with shining bluish metallic scales. Cilia as on the upperside; tail black tipped with white. Antenna, head, thorax and abdomen black, the shafts of the antennae ringed with white, the thorax with a little bluish pubescence; beneath: the palpi, thorax and abdomen white.

Female upperside: dark brown; bases of the wings suffused with bluish scales. Forewing: the transverse discocellular spot as in the 6 but continued posteriorly by a black spot in interspace 2 coalescent with a similar spot in interspace 1 (in some specimens the latter two spots are only seen by transparency from the underside); a medial area beyond apex of cell white, crossed by an upper discal, macular, short black band that extends from vein 3 to vein 6; the ground colour over the rest uniform; on the costal margin there are some pale lines between veins 10, 11 and 12, and on the broad terminal margin of ground colour an obscure transverse macular white line. Hindwing: basal, cellular and discal markings of the underside more or less apparent through transparency; a postdiscal and a subterminal transverse series of white somewhat quadrate spots, the two series converge and meet anteriorly in interspace 6, the outer of the two is margined by the series of black subterminal spots of the underside which show through more or less plainly. Cilia of both forewings and hindwings and tail at apex of vein 2 of the hindwing as in the male. Underside: similar to that of the male, the ground colour slightly yellowish, the markings more clearly defined. Antennae, head, thorax and abdomen as in the male.

== Distribution ==
Northern and western Africa; Arabia; Persia; Baluchistan; north-western Himalayas; the Punjab; western, central and southern India; Ceylon; Assam; Upper Burma.

== Larva ==
"Just half an inch in length when full grown, much flattened, the head pale ochreous and completely hidden under the second segment which is somewhat wide, the third and fourth segments progressively a little wider, whence the body gradually tapers to the last segment which is about as wide as the second. Colour pale green, the whole upper surface covered with a shagreening of small white tubercles which under a magnifying-glass give it a frosted appearance; along the lateral edge of the body and round the anal segment there are numerous somewhat long whitish hairs. Prom the third to the anal segment there is a somewhat broad (slightly decreasing in width posteriorly) yellowish-green dorsal stripe, which bears a red stripe in its middle, decreasingly on the first four segments on which it appears; in some specimens the dorsal stripe is marked with reddish on both sides, which colour is very conspicuous on the twelfth and thirteenth segments. There is also a subdorsal series of small spots from the third to the eleventh segments inclusive which are quite inconspicuous in some specimens. The extensile organs on the twelfth segment are small. The constrictions between the segments slight and inconspicuous .... The larvae feed on the young leaves and flower-buds of Ziziphus lotus and Ziziphus jujuba. Dr. A. Forel of Geneva identifies the ants which attend these larvae as Camponotus rubripes, Drury (sylvaticus, Fabr. subspecies compressus, Fabr.) and Pheidole latinoda, Roger." (de Niceville.)

== Pupa ==
"Of the usual Lycaenid shape; head, thorax and wing-cases green speckled thickly with black, abdomen green. There is an indistinct blackish line extending down the whole length of the body, with a double subdorsal series of indistinct black specks; the head is rounded, the thorax slightly humped; the pupa throughout quite smooth."(de Niceville.)

== See also ==
- List of butterflies of India
- List of butterflies of India (Lycaenidae)
