= Tarucus kiki =

Scientific classification
- Domain: Eukaryota
- Kingdom: Animalia
- Phylum: Arthropoda
- Class: Insecta
- Order: Lepidoptera
- Family: Lycaenidae
- Genus: Tarucus
- Species: T. kiki

Binomial name
- Tarucus kiki Larsen, 1976

Species of butterfly

Tarucus kiki, the Kiki's Pierrot, is a butterfly in the family Lycaenidae. It is found in Burkina Faso, northern Ivory Coast and Nigeria. The habitat consists of savanna.

The larvae feed on Ziziphus species.
