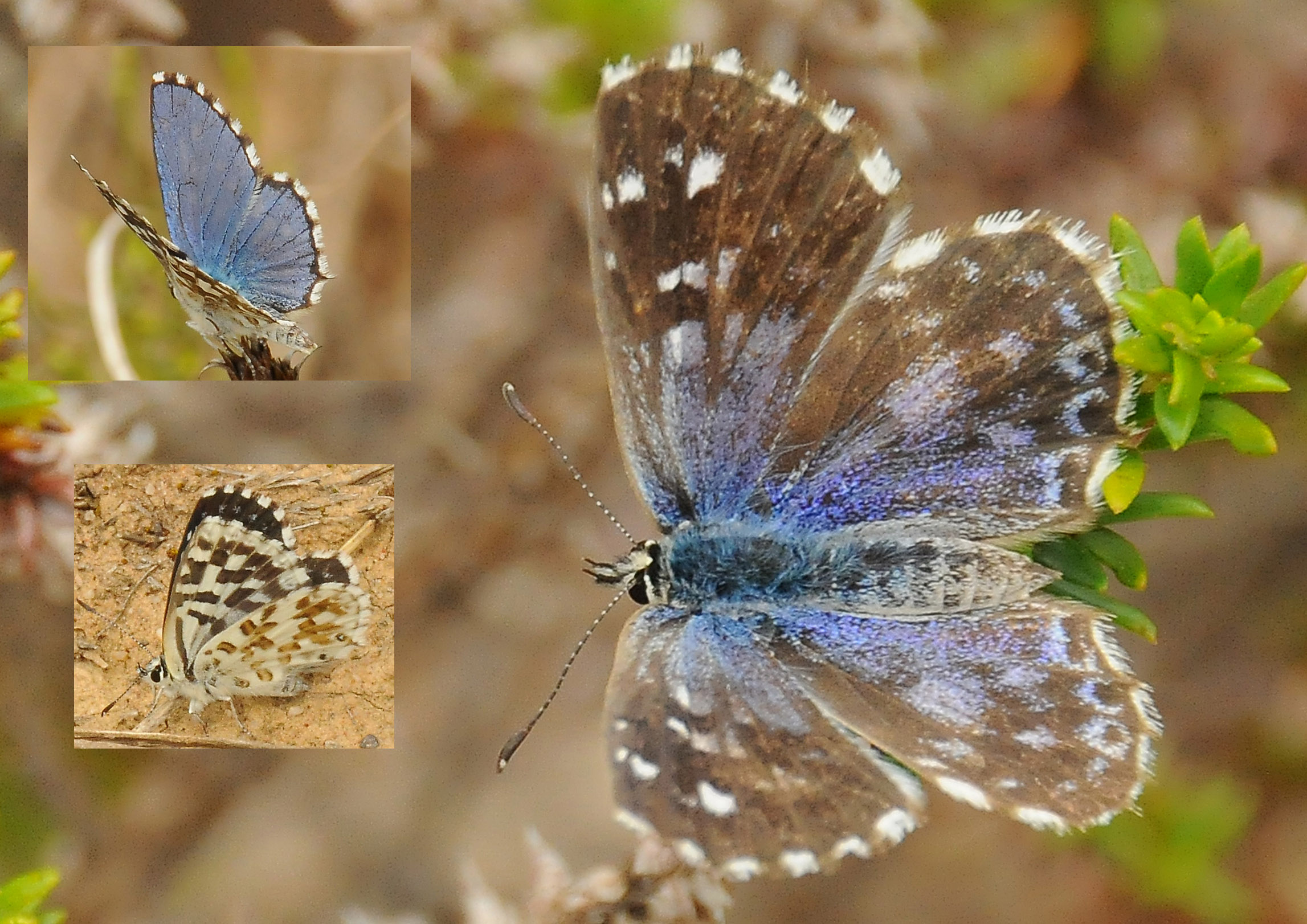

Scientific classification
- Kingdom: Animalia
- Phylum: Arthropoda
- Class: Insecta
- Order: Lepidoptera
- Family: Lycaenidae
- Genus: Tarucus
- Species: T. bowkeri

Binomial name
- Tarucus bowkeri (Trimen, 1883)

Synonyms
- Lycaena bowkeri Trimen, 1883

= Tarucus bowkeri =

Species of butterfly

Tarucus bowkeri, or Bowker's blue, is a butterfly of the family Lycaenidae. It is found in South Africa, from the Northern Cape, south to fynbos in the West Cape and east to the Amathole Mountains in the Eastern Cape.

The wingspan is 23–27 mm for males and 26–29 mm for females. Adults are on wing from October to March, but is most common in early summer and sometimes also on wing in winter. There are multiple generations per year.

The larvae feed on Phylica paniculata.

== Subspecies ==
- Tarucus bowkeri bowkeri (from Eastern Cape along escarpment to KwaZulu-Natal and along the Drakensberg foothills)
- Tarucus bowkeri transvaalensis Quickelberge, 1972 (from Mpumalanga and the Limpopo province along the Drakensberg escarpment)
