= Tarucus alteratus =

Rusty Pierrot

Scientific classification
- Domain: Eukaryota
- Kingdom: Animalia
- Phylum: Arthropoda
- Class: Insecta
- Order: Lepidoptera
- Family: Lycaenidae
- Genus: Tarucus
- Species: T. alteratus

Binomial name
- Tarucus alteratus Moore, 1882

Species of butterfly

Tarucus alteratus, the rusty Pierrot, is a small butterfly found in India that belongs to the lycaenids or blues family. The species was first described by Frederic Moore in 1882.

== See also ==
- List of butterflies of India
- List of butterflies of India (Lycaenidae)
