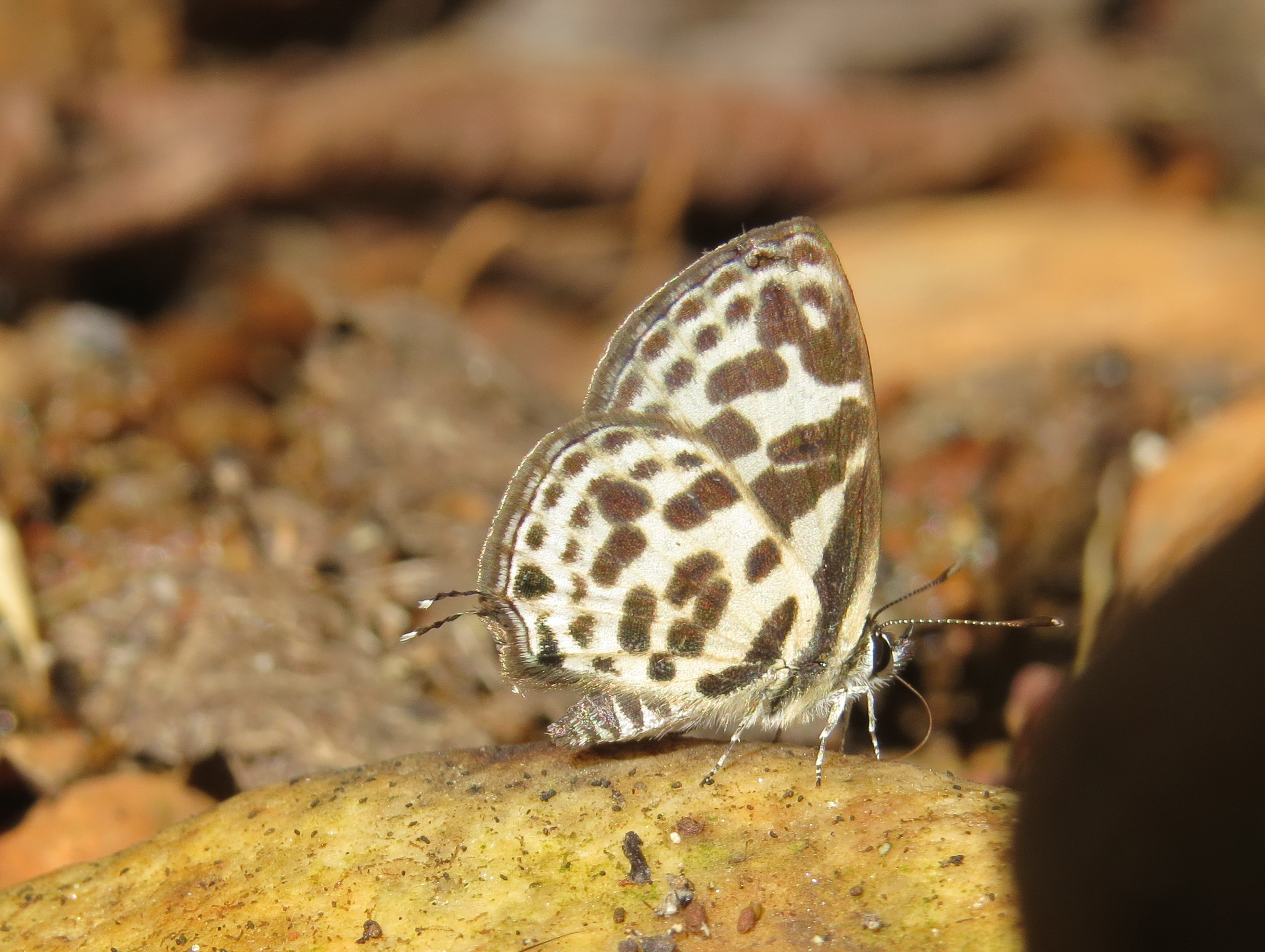

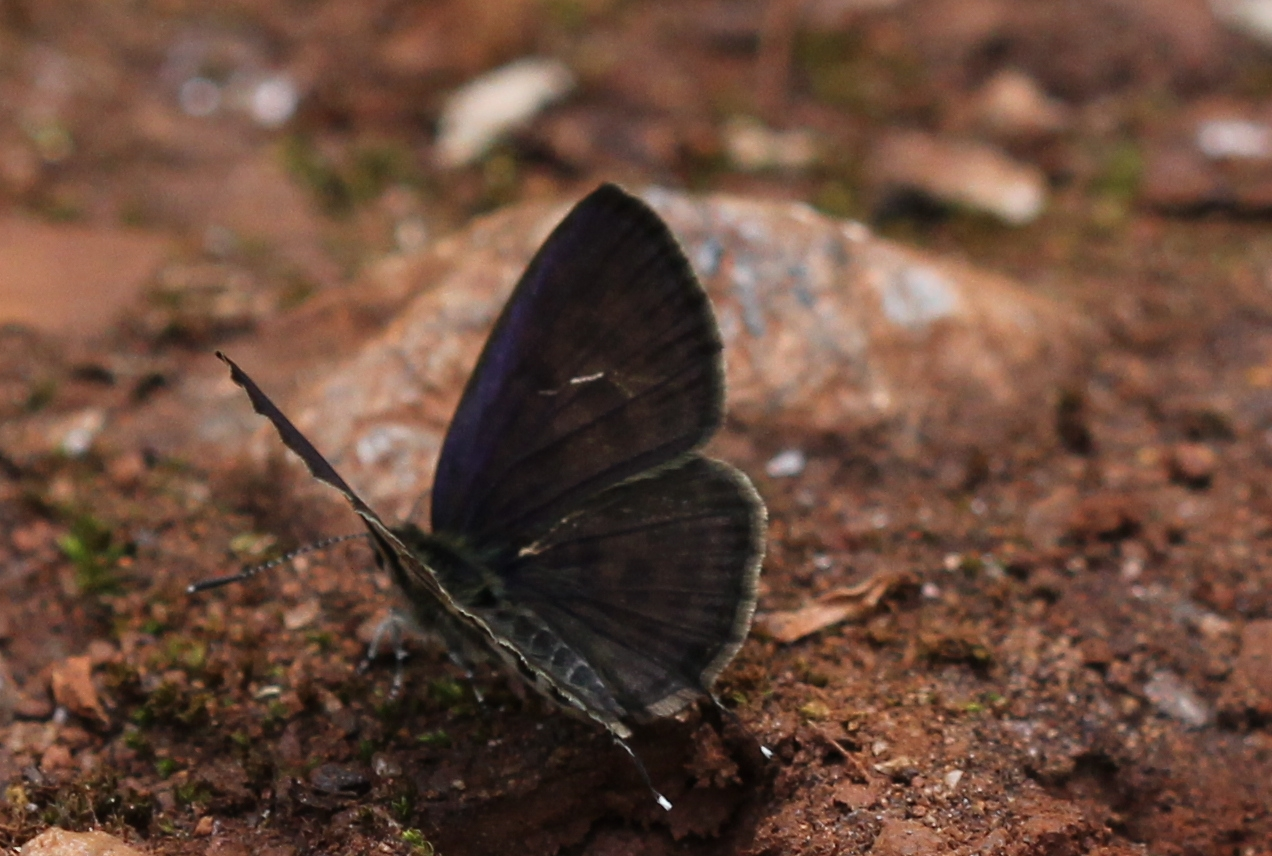

Scientific classification
- Kingdom: Animalia
- Phylum: Arthropoda
- Class: Insecta
- Order: Lepidoptera
- Family: Lycaenidae
- Genus: Tarucus
- Species: T. ananda

Binomial name
- Tarucus ananda (de Nicéville, [1884])

Synonyms
- Castalius ananda

= Tarucus ananda =

Dark Pierrot

Species of butterfly

Tarucus ananda, the dark Pierrot, is a small butterfly found in India that belongs to the lycaenids or blues family. It was formerly placed in the genus Castalius, and with the delimitation of Castalius versus Tarucus being not fully resolved this may well be correct.

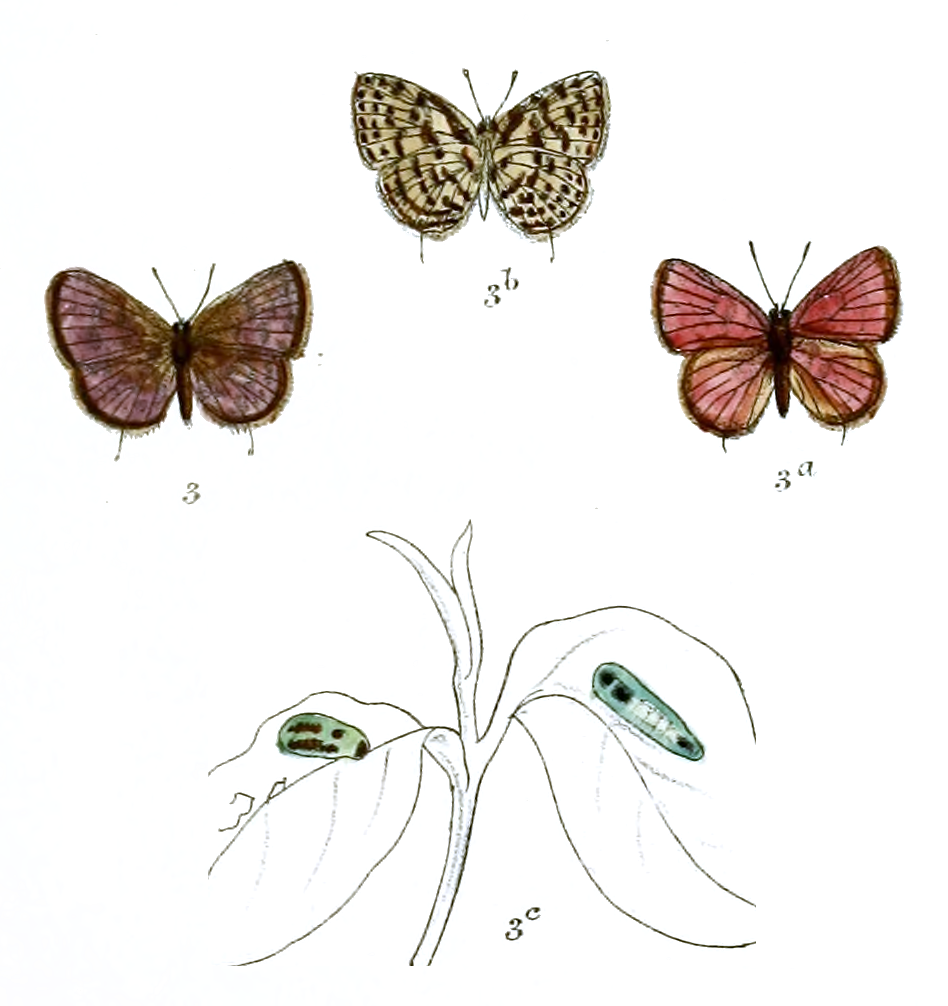

== Distribution ==
Peninsular and southern India up to Mumbai; Sikkim, Assam and Khasi Hills onto Myanmar and Dawnas; Orissa. In southern India the butterfly occurs in Kanara, Nilgiris and Anaimalai Hills, and possibly Thailand.

== Status ==
William Harry Evans described the species as not being rare.

== Description ==
=== Male ===
Upperside: dark purple, sometimes fuliginous, sometimes bright and shining. Forewings and hindwings: terminal margins edged with fuscous brownish black and an anteciliary jet-black line; cilia brown; tail black tipped with white. Underside: more or less dingy white. Forewing: a broad oblique brownish-black band from base to just before the middle of the costa; from the latter a dark brownish-black bar proceeds vertically down to middle of interspace 3, on the inner side of this and touching it in the middle is a large brownish-black irregular spot that extends posteriorly to vein 1; beyond this a broad discal transverse brownish-black band twice interrupted, the posterior portion slightly narrowed below is shifted obliquely inwards and ends on vein 1; this is followed by a postdiscal transverse series of brownish-black spots that anteriorly nearly coalesces with the discal band, a transverse subterminal line of similar but smaller spots and a well-marked anteciliary black line. Hindwing: a basal short, brownish-black, anteriorly attenuate bar placed obliquely, a transverse subbasal band of four large coalescent black spots, a transverse curved discal band twice broken as on the forewing and similar postdiscal subterminal and terminal markings. Antennae black, shafts ringed with white, head, thorax and abdomen dark brownish black; beneath: the palpi black, thorax and abdomen down the middle white.

=== Female ===
Upperside: fuscous black. Forewings and hindwings: in most specimens the markings of the underside show (sometimes very conspicuously) through. Underside: as in the male. Antenna, head, thorax and abdomen similar to those of the male.

=== Larva ===
"Like that of Castalius ananda feeds only on the parenchyma of the leaf .... It is of the usual woodlouse form, slightly flattened head concealed in the second segment; surface more or less rough; a fringe of long white bristles all round with an erected ridge of similar bristles along the back from the second segment; those on the 3rd and 7th segments and the last two much longer than the others; those on the 2nd segment very few, short and black. It has a conspicuous gland on the 12th segment, and is attended by small species of ants of the genus Crematogaster. Its colour is pale green, the dorsal portion of the 2nd, 4th, 5th, 6th and last two segments being dark brown, while the centre segments are almost yellow with a darker dorsal line. We found it feeding on Zizyphus xylopyrus and also on Loranthus, where it was attended by Crematogaster ants."

=== Pupa ===
"Of the usual Castalius form but narrow and slightly flattened. It is intensely glossy as if covered with gum. It varies in colour, being sometimes black, at others green with inconstant black markings." (Davidson, Bell & Aitken)

=== Food plants ===
Larvae feed on Loranthus and Zizyphus.

=== Ant association ===
Tarucus ananda is associated with Crematogaster.

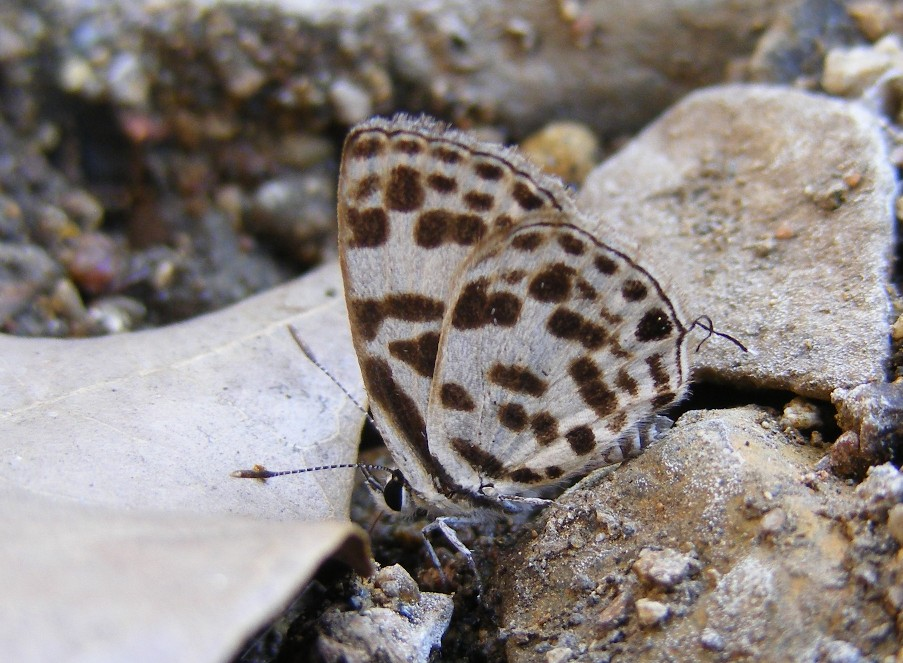

== See also ==
- List of butterflies of India (Lycaenidae)
