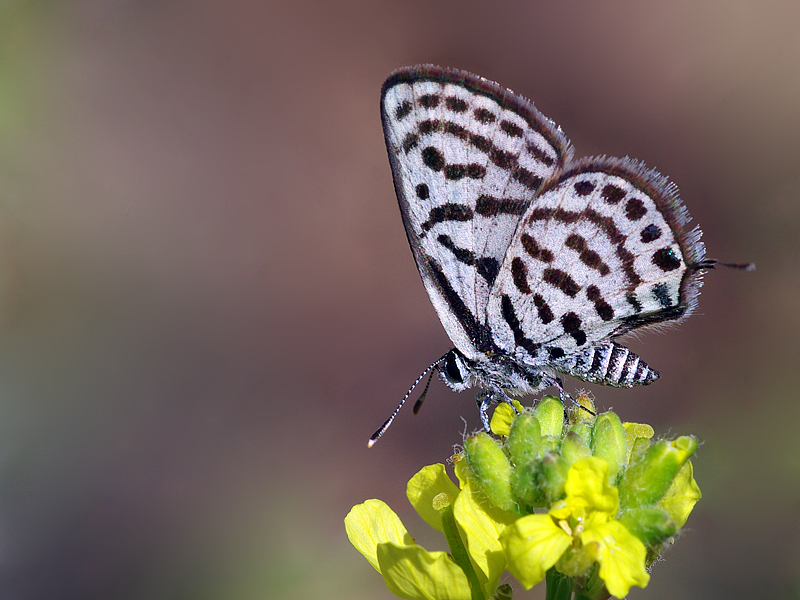
- From Mersin, Turkey

Conservation status
- Least Concern (IUCN 3.1)

Scientific classification
- Kingdom: Animalia
- Phylum: Arthropoda
- Clade: Pancrustacea
- Class: Insecta
- Order: Lepidoptera
- Family: Lycaenidae
- Genus: Tarucus
- Species: T. balkanicus

Binomial name
- Tarucus balkanicus (Freyer, 1885)

Synonyms
- Lycaena balkanica Freyer, 1843; Tarucus balkanica var. areshana Bethune-Baker, [1918]; Tarucus callinara f. nigra Bethune-Baker, [1918]; Tarucus frivaldszkyi Aigner-Abafi, 1906; Tarucus clorinda Verity, 1938

= Tarucus balkanicus =

Balkan Pierrot

Species of butterfly

Tarucus balkanicus, the Balkan Pierrot or little tiger blue, is a small butterfly that belongs to the lycaenids or blues family. They inhabit parts of West Africa, East Africa, the Middle East, North Africa, the Balkans, western and parts of central Asia, and arid savanna.

Their larvae feed on the Jerusalem thorn trees and on Ziziphus lotus.

== Subspecies ==
- T. b. balkanicus (Mauritania, Niger: Aïr region, Sudan, Uganda, Saudi Arabia, United Arab Emirates, Oman, Algeria, South East Europe, Asia Minor, Middle East, Syria, Iran, North Africa)
- T. b. areshana Bethune-Baker, [1918] (Kopet-Dagh)
- T. b. alternatus Moore, 1882 (Ghissar, Darvaz)
- T. b. nigra Bethune-Baker, 1918- Black-spotted pierrot (Baluchistan, Saurasthtra, Delhi, Peshawar, Simla Hills, C.India)

== Description ==
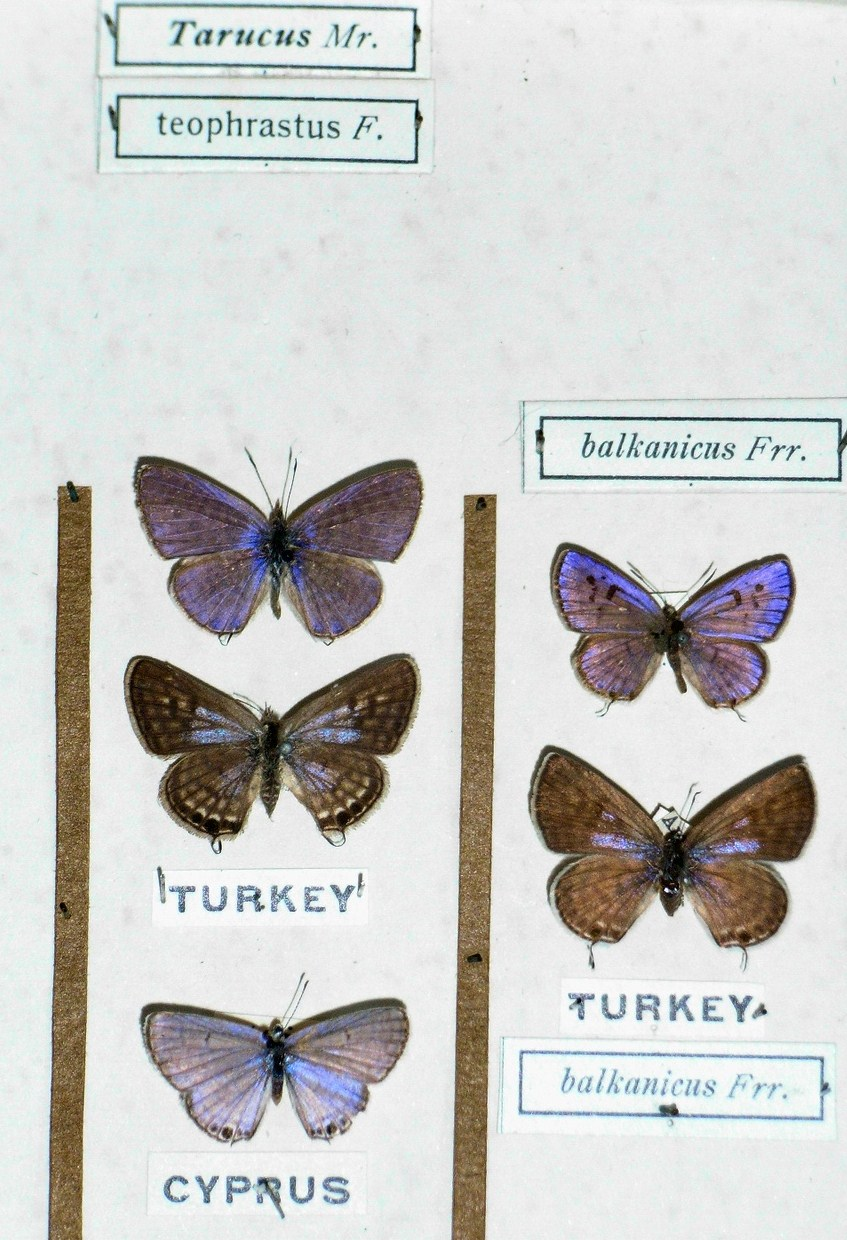
Tarucus balkanicus male (top) and female (bottom)

=== Underside ===
- Tailed.
- White with a prominent black streak from the base of both wings.
- Markings normally black.
- Continuous sub-marginal bands of connected black streaks.

=== Topside ===
- Male: discal spots and spot at cell-end on forewing.
- Mostly dark blue with a narrow border.
- Female: Brownish grey with dark markings.

== See also ==
- Lycaenidae
- List of butterflies of India
- List of butterflies of India (Lycaenidae)
