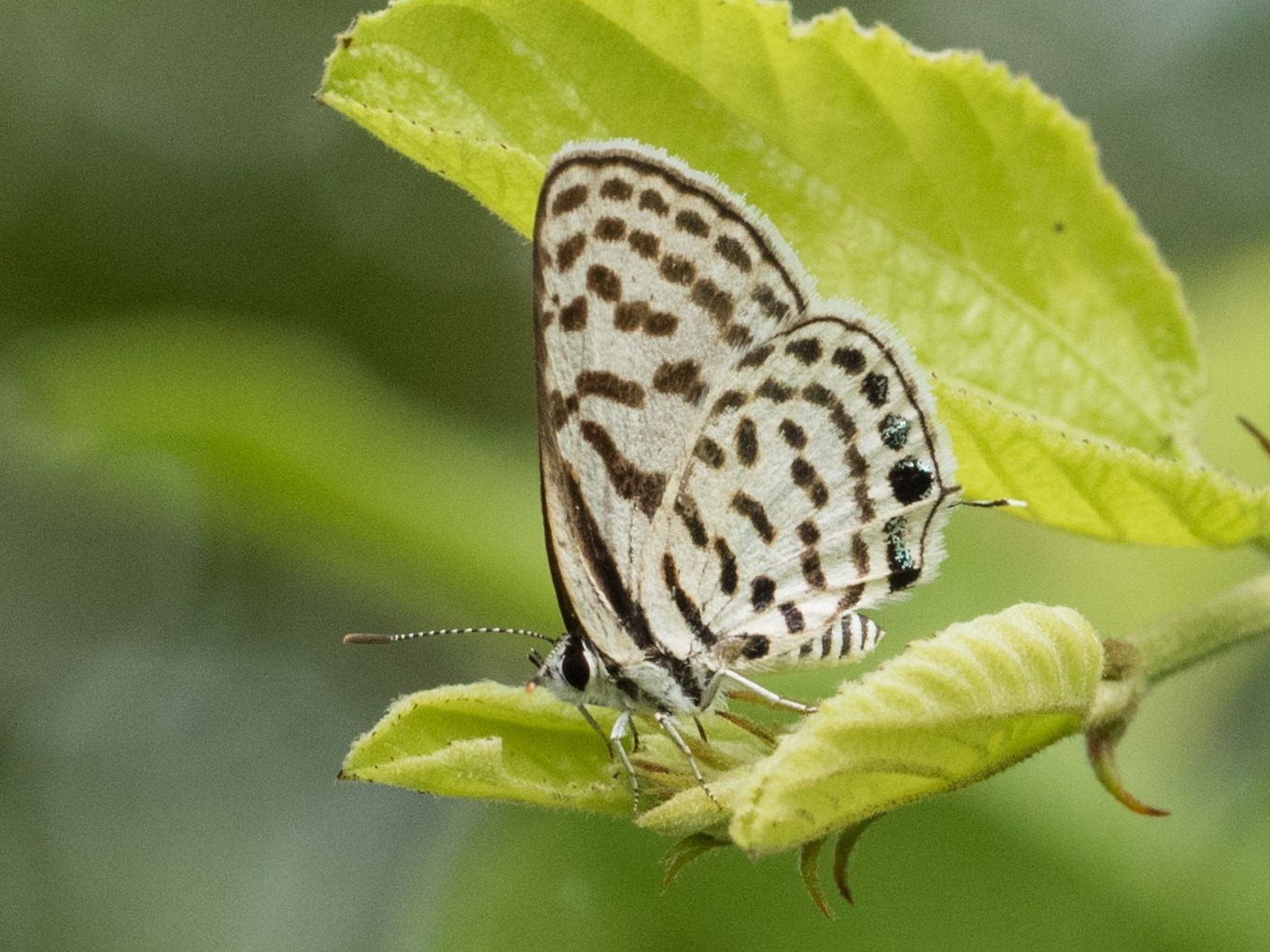

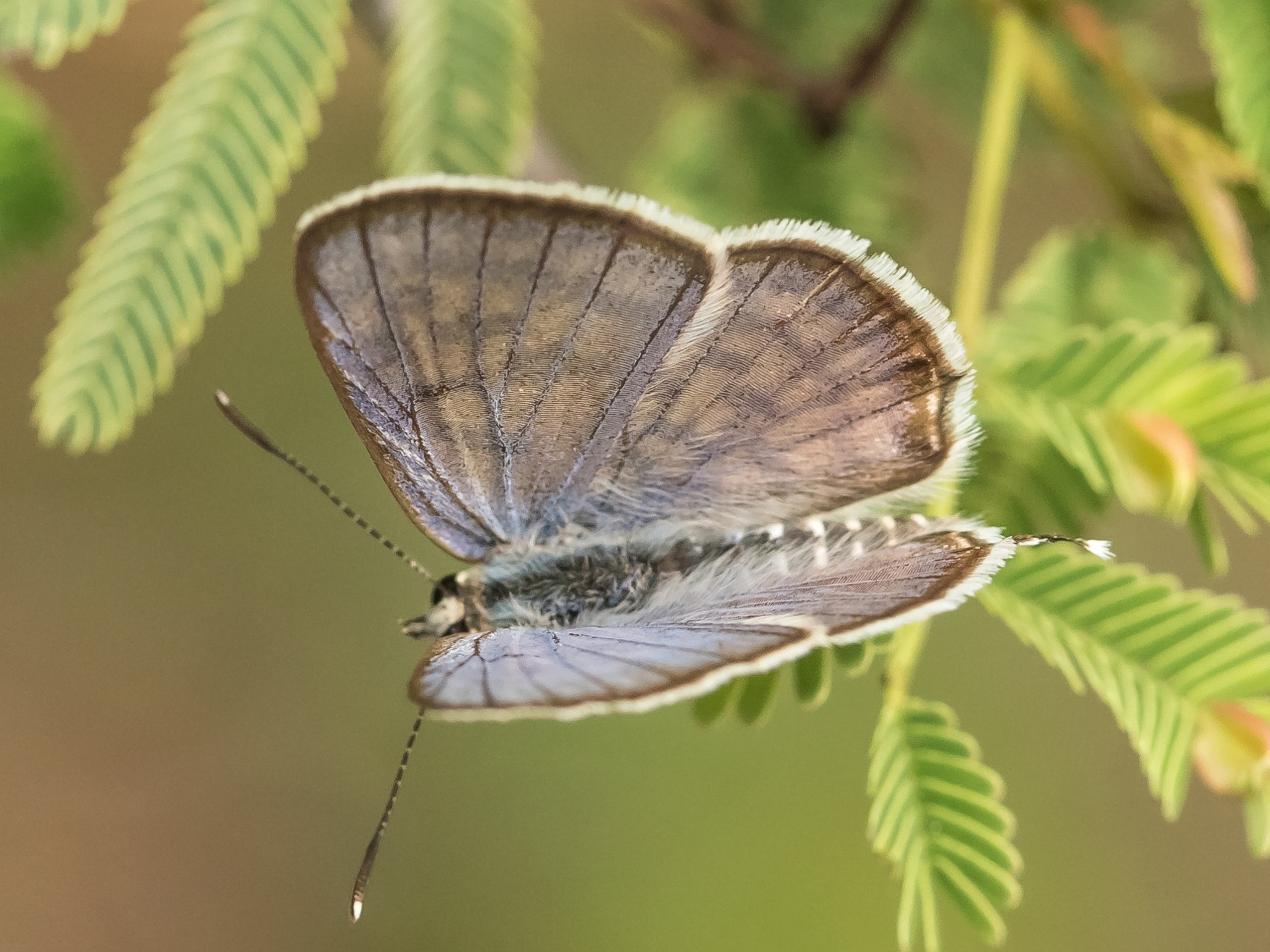
- Dorsel view

Scientific classification
- Kingdom: Animalia
- Phylum: Arthropoda
- Clade: Pancrustacea
- Class: Insecta
- Order: Lepidoptera
- Family: Lycaenidae
- Genus: Tarucus
- Species: T. indica

Binomial name
- Tarucus indica Evans, 1932

= Tarucus indica =

Indian Pierrot

Species of butterfly

Tarucus indica, the Indian Pierrot, is a small butterfly found in India that belongs to the lycaenids or blues family.

== See also ==
- List of butterflies of India
- List of butterflies of India (Lycaenidae)
