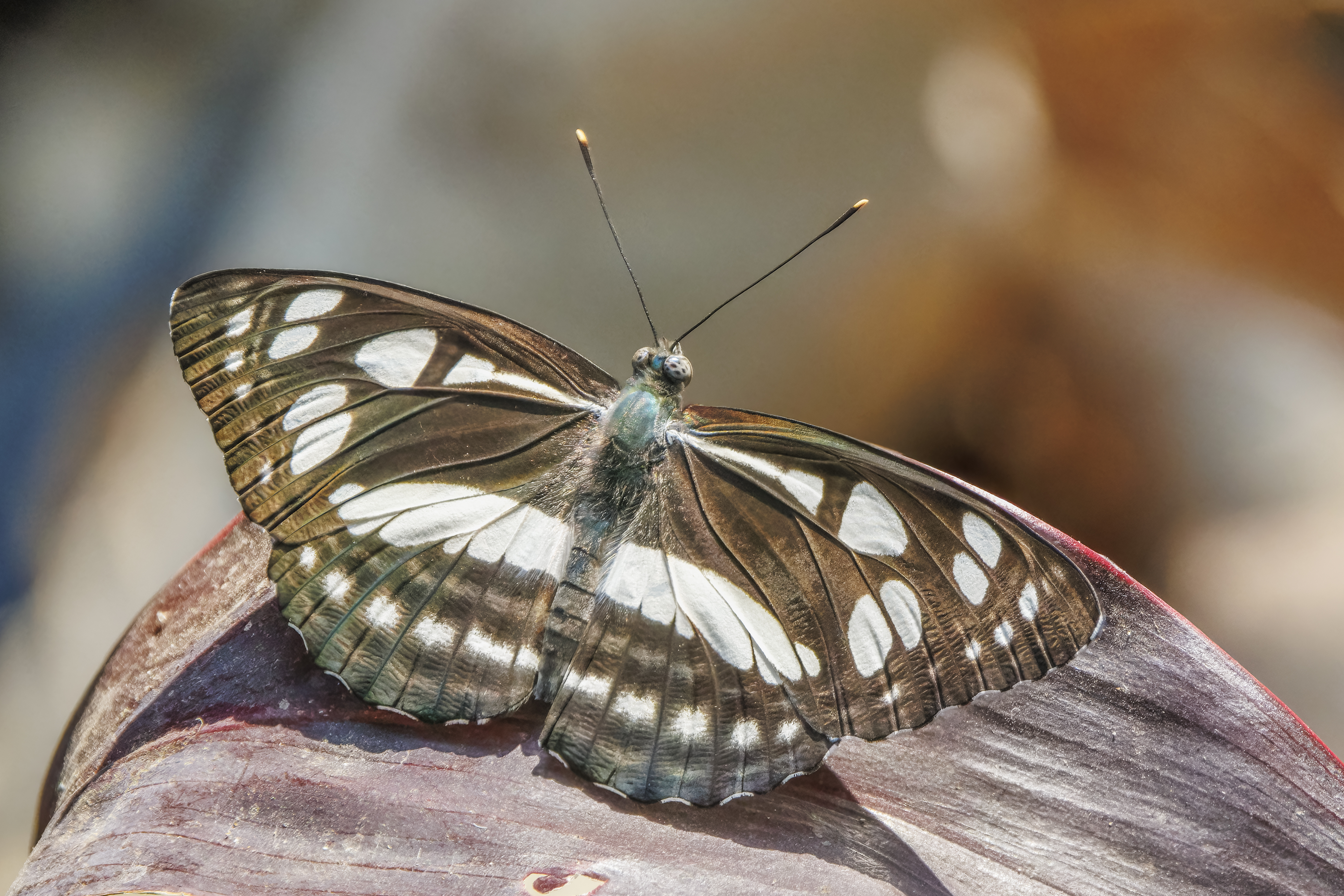
- N. c. martabana, from Laos
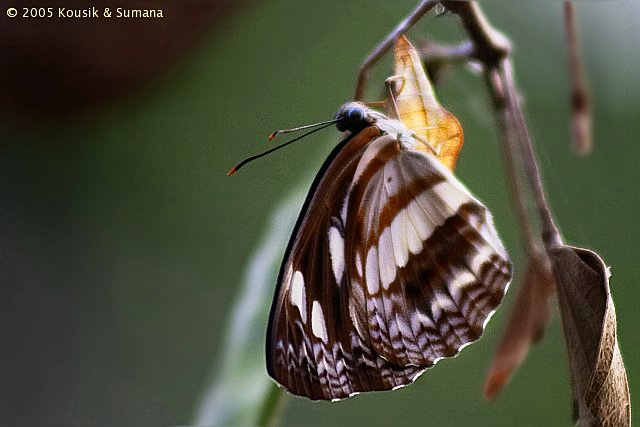
- from Kolkata

Scientific classification
- Kingdom: Animalia
- Phylum: Arthropoda
- Clade: Pancrustacea
- Class: Insecta
- Order: Lepidoptera
- Family: Nymphalidae
- Genus: Neptis
- Species: N. columella

Binomial name
- Neptis columella (Cramer, 1780)

Synonyms
- Phaedyma columella (Cramer, [1780])

= Neptis columella =

Short banded sailer

Species of butterfly

Neptis columella, the short banded sailer, is a species of nymphalid butterfly found in South and Southeast Asia.

== Description ==
Upperside black, with white markings. Forewing: discoidal streak widening towards apex, notched pre-apically on the anterior margin and obliquely truncate at apex; spot beyond large, broadly triangular, well separated; discal spots in pairs varying in size, spot of this series in interspace 1 always an elongate; spots in transverse postdiscal series obscure, not all well defined, margined on both sides with deeper black than that of the ground colour; the space between the series and the discal spots and also the terminal margin beyond it with obscure transverse pale markings. Hindwing: costal margin broadly greyish brown; subbasal band not extending to the costa, of varying width; discal and subterminal pale transverse lines, the space between them darker than the ground colour, traversed by a prominent series of postdiscal spots of varying size. Cilia white alternating with black. Underside ferruginous brown; white markings as on the upperside but broader; the pale markings between the discal and postdiscal series of spots, the subterminal markings on the upperside of the forewing, and the discal and subterminal pale lines on the upperside of the hindwing represented by pale lunular transverse whitish markings. The costal margin of the hindwing above vein 8 very broad, especially in the female. Antennae dark brown to black; head, thorax and abdomen dark brownish black; beneath white.

== Distribution ==
Western and southern India, recorded from Our Panjal range Nowshera, Rajouri Jammu and Kashmir UT Mahabaleshwar near Mumbai, and the Nilgiris; Sikkim, Bhutan, through the hills of Assam, Myanmar and Tenasserim to the Malay Peninsula, Thailand and Sumatra.

== Subspecies ==
- P. c. columella S.China, Hong Kong, Hainan, Tonkin
- P. c. eremita C. & R. Felder, [1867] Luzon
- P. c. ophiana (Moore, 1872) Sikkim, Assam, N.Burma
- P. c. martabana (Moore, 1881) S.Yunnan, Burma, Siam, South Vietnam
- P. c. bataviana (Moore, 1898) Java, Bali
- P. c. nilgirica (Moore, 1889) S.India
- P. c. ophianella (Staudinger, 1889) Palawan
- P. c. soror Semper, 1889 Layte, Camotes
- P. c. angara Semper, 1889 SE.Mindanao
- P. c. singa (Fruhstorfer, 1899) Malaya, Sumatra
- P. c. lombokiana (Fruhstorfer, 1899) Lombok, Sumbawa
- P. c. kangeana Fruhstorfer, 1905 Kangean Island
- P. c. baweana Fruhstorfer, 1905 Bawean
- P. c. sumbana Fruhstorfer, 1905 Sumba
- P. c. guimarensis (Fruhstorfer, 1913) Guimarens
- P. c. binghami Fruhstorfer, 1905 Nicobars
- P. c. eumeneia (Fruhstorfer, 1913) Mindoro
- P. c. mesogaia (Fruhstorfer, 1913) Mindanao
- P. c. parvimacula (Pendlebury, 1933) Pulau Tioman
- P. c. karimondjawae (van Eecke, 1933) Karimundjawa
- P. c. adonara Eliot, 1969 Flores, Adonara

== Gallery ==
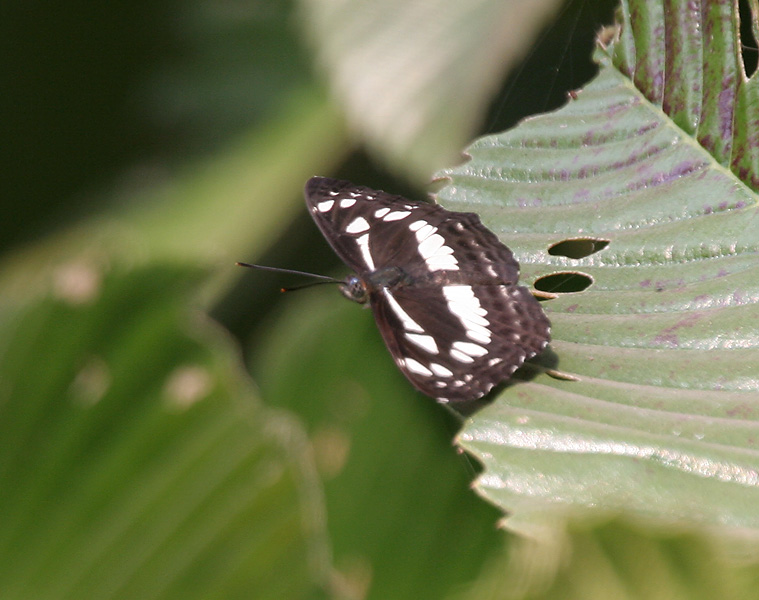
On a chalta (Dillenia indica) leaf in Kolkata, West Bengal, India

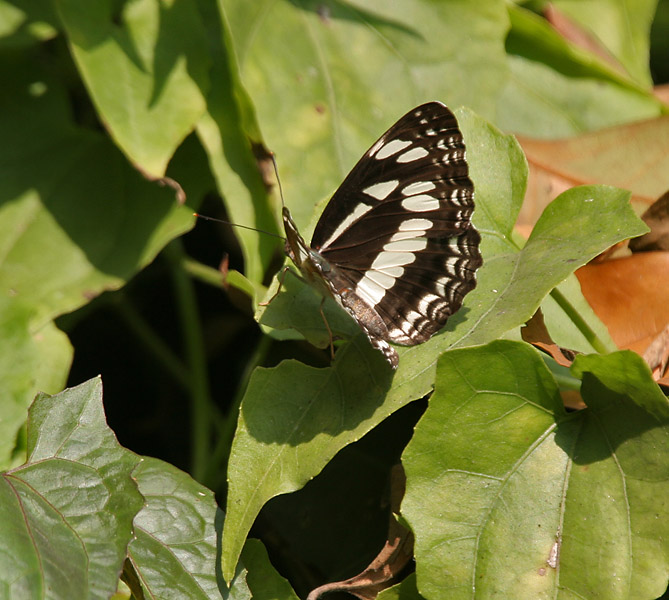
In Kolkata, West Bengal
