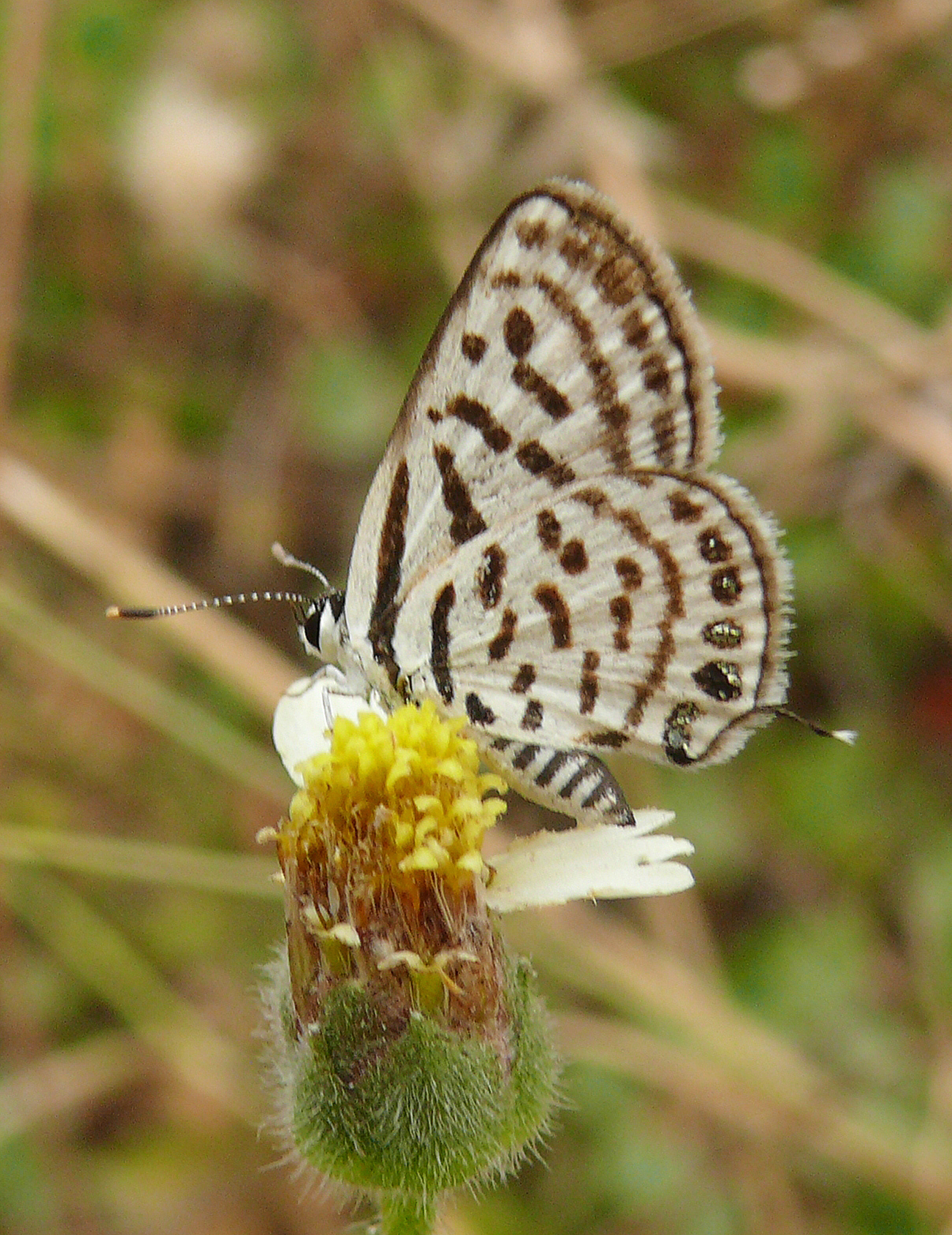
- From Delhi, India

Scientific classification
- Kingdom: Animalia
- Phylum: Arthropoda
- Clade: Pancrustacea
- Class: Insecta
- Order: Lepidoptera
- Family: Lycaenidae
- Genus: Tarucus
- Species: T. nara

Binomial name
- Tarucus nara Kollar 1848

= Tarucus nara =

Striped Pierrot

Species of butterfly

Tarucus nara, the striped Pierrot, is a small butterfly found in Sri Lanka and south India that belongs to the lycaenids or blues family.

== Gallery ==
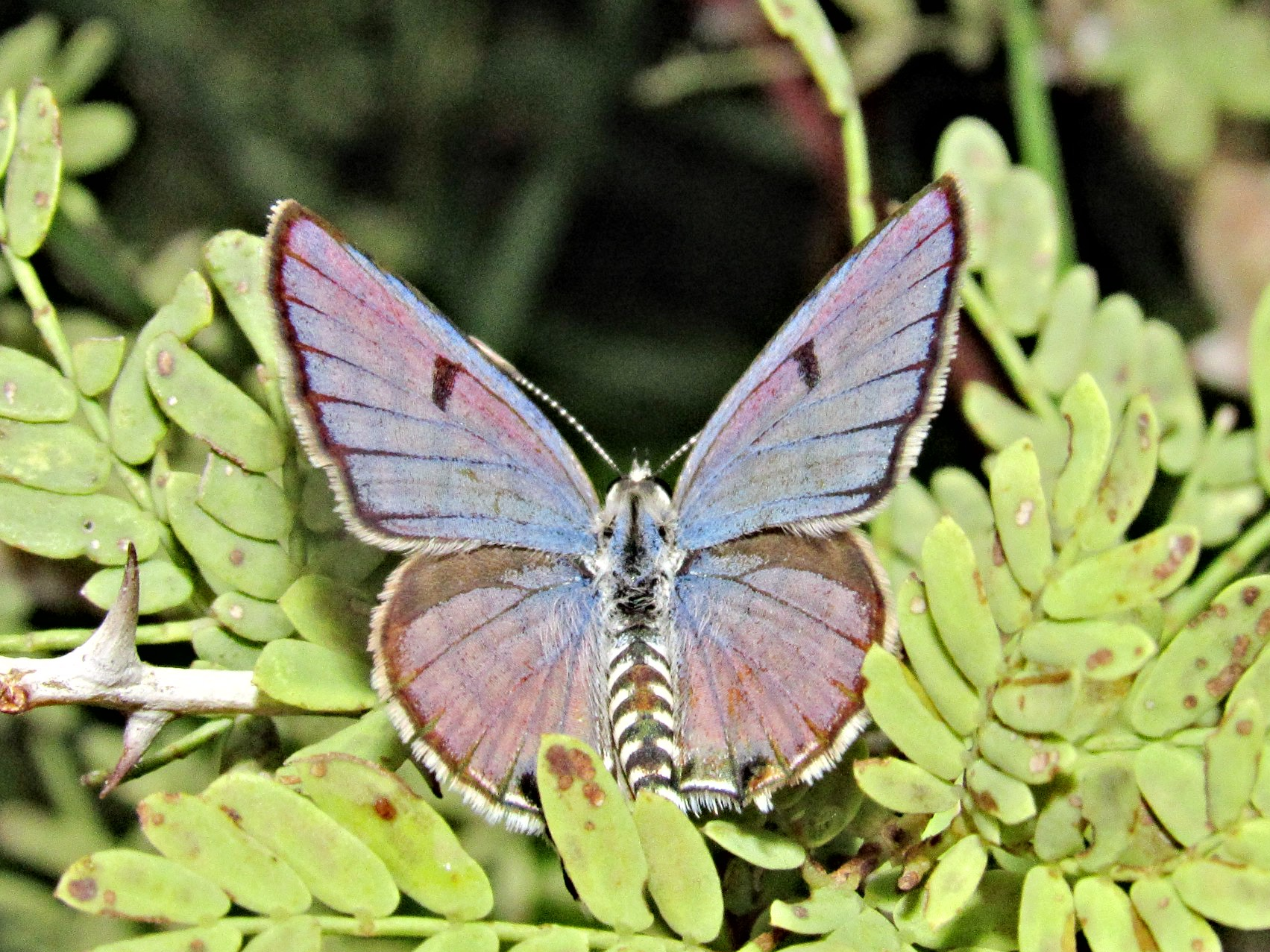
Dorsal view (male)

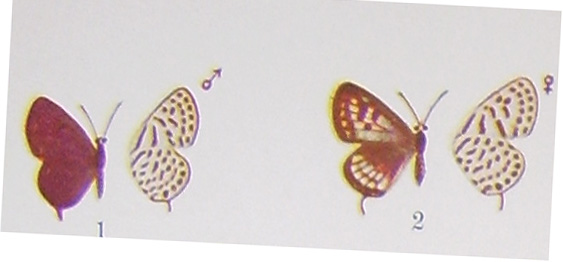
Image from Adalbert Seitz

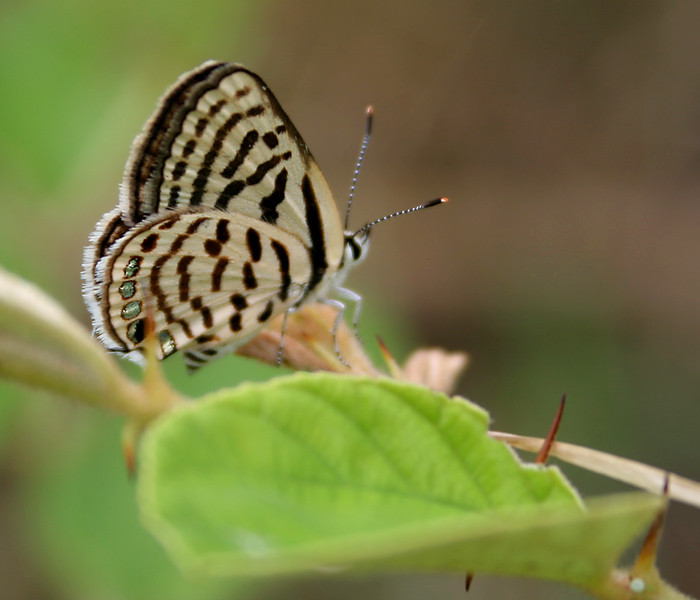
Female on Zizyphus species in Hyderabad, India

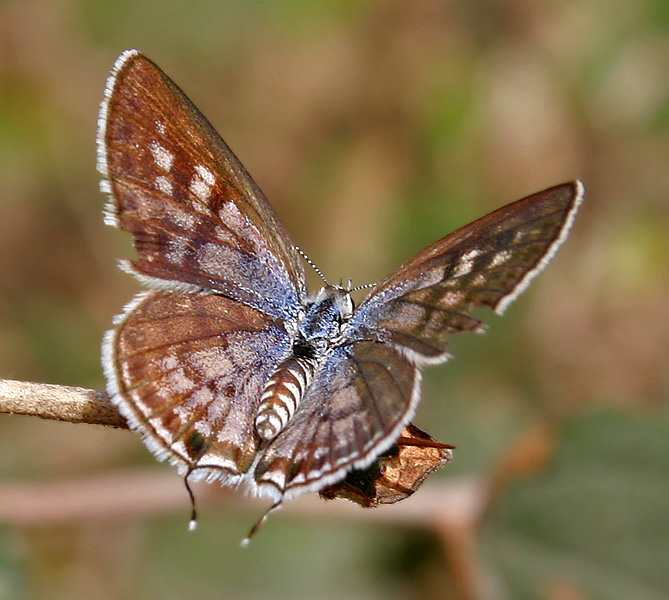
Female in Hyderabad

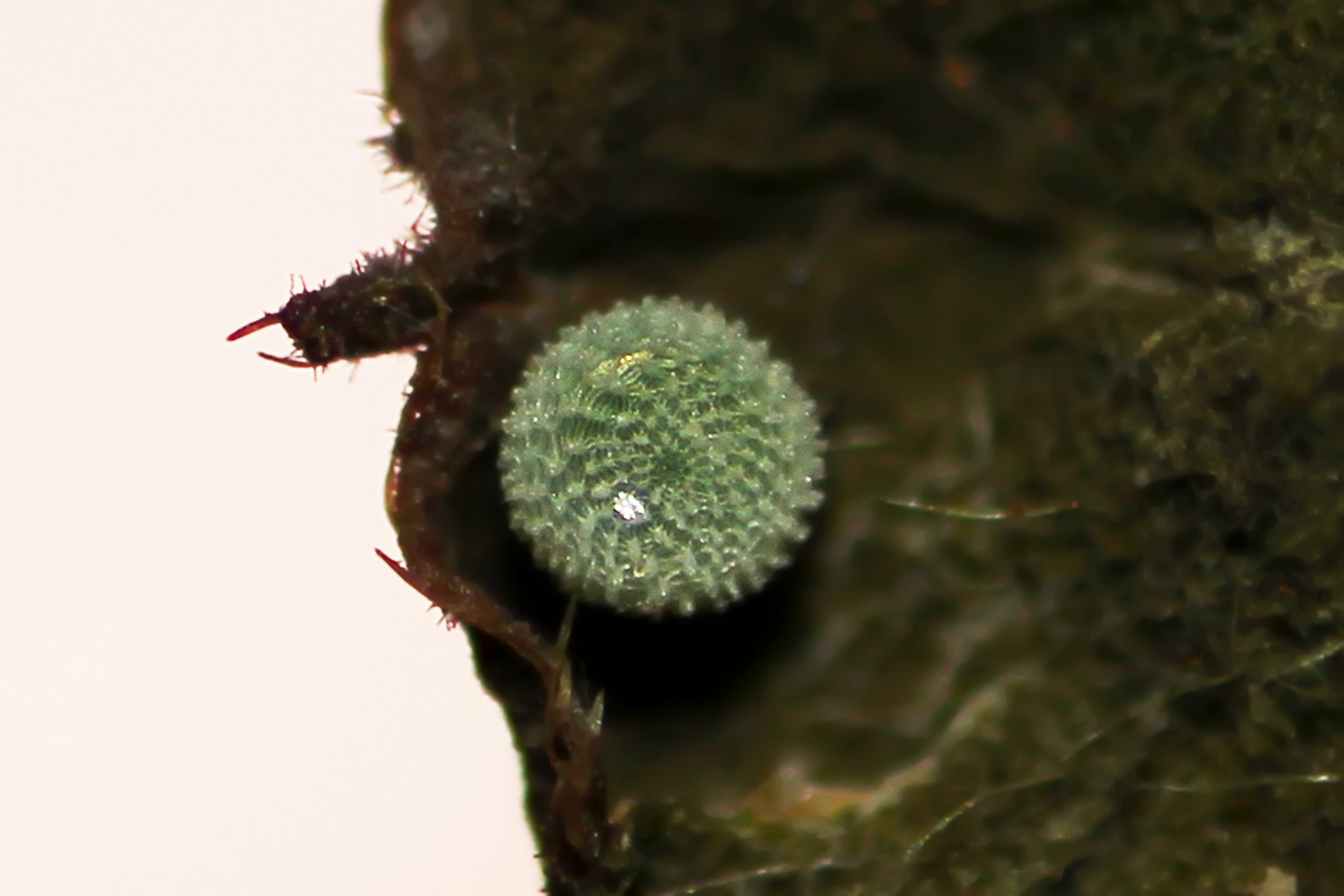
Egg

== See also ==
- List of butterflies of India
- List of butterflies of India (Lycaenidae)
