= Tarucus balkanicus nigra =

Black-spotted Pierrot

Scientific classification
- Domain: Eukaryota
- Kingdom: Animalia
- Phylum: Arthropoda
- Class: Insecta
- Order: Lepidoptera
- Family: Lycaenidae
- Genus: Tarucus
- Species: T. balkanicus
- Subspecies: T. b. nigra

Trinomial name
- Tarucus balkanicus nigra Bethune-Baker, 1918

Synonyms
- Tarucus nigra Bethune-Baker, 1918

Subspecies of butterfly

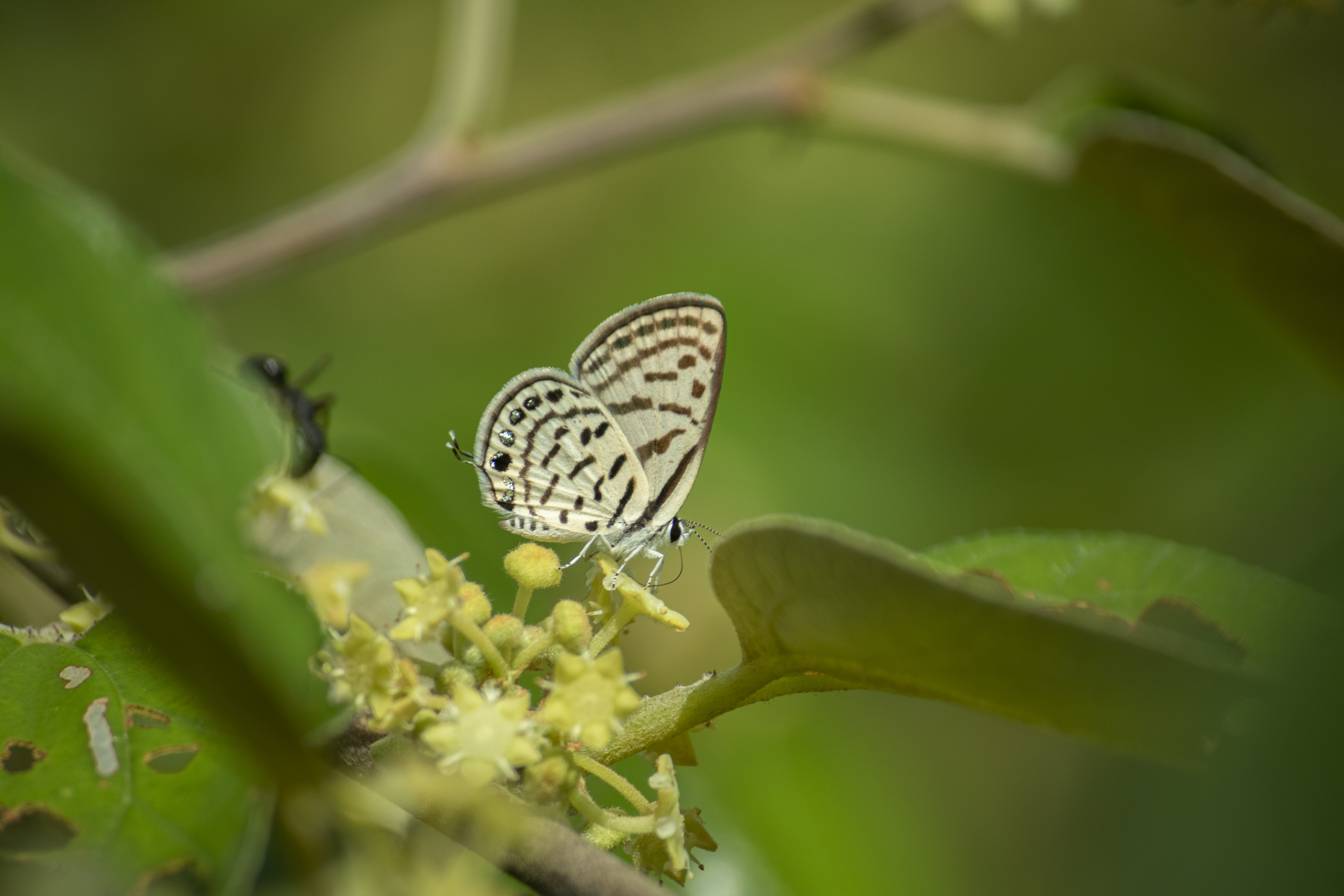
Nectaring position of the Tarucus balkanica

Tarucus balcanicus nigra, the black-spotted Pierrot, is a small butterfly found in India that belongs to the lycaenids or blues family.

Formerly regarded as a distinct species, it is nowadays considered to be a well-marked eastern subspecies of the Balkan Pierrot (T. balkanicus).

== See also ==
- List of butterflies of India (Lycaenidae)
