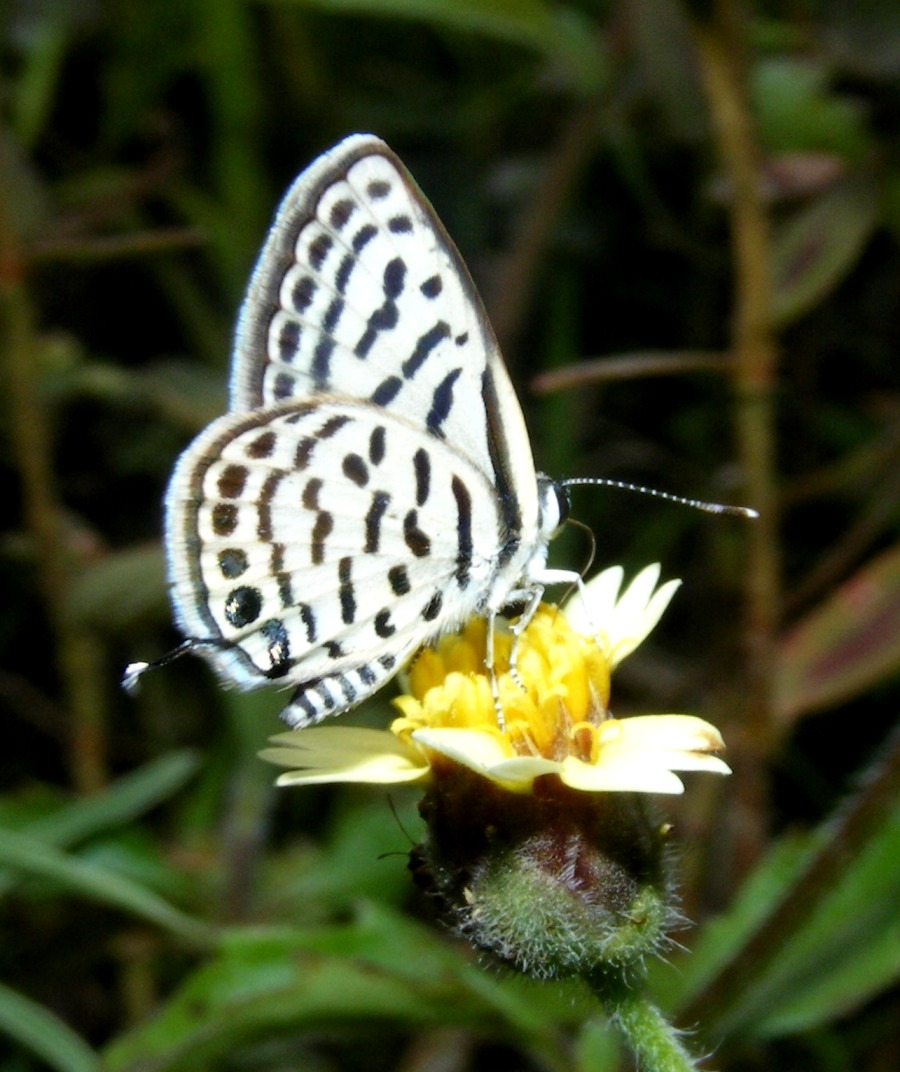

Scientific classification
- Kingdom: Animalia
- Phylum: Arthropoda
- Class: Insecta
- Order: Lepidoptera
- Family: Lycaenidae
- Genus: Tarucus
- Species: T. extricatus

Binomial name
- Tarucus extricatus Butler 1886

= Tarucus extricatus =

Rounded Pierrot

Species of butterfly

Tarucus extricatus, the rounded Pierrot, is a small butterfly found in India that belongs to the lycaenids or blues family.

== See also ==
- List of butterflies of India
- List of butterflies of India (Lycaenidae)
