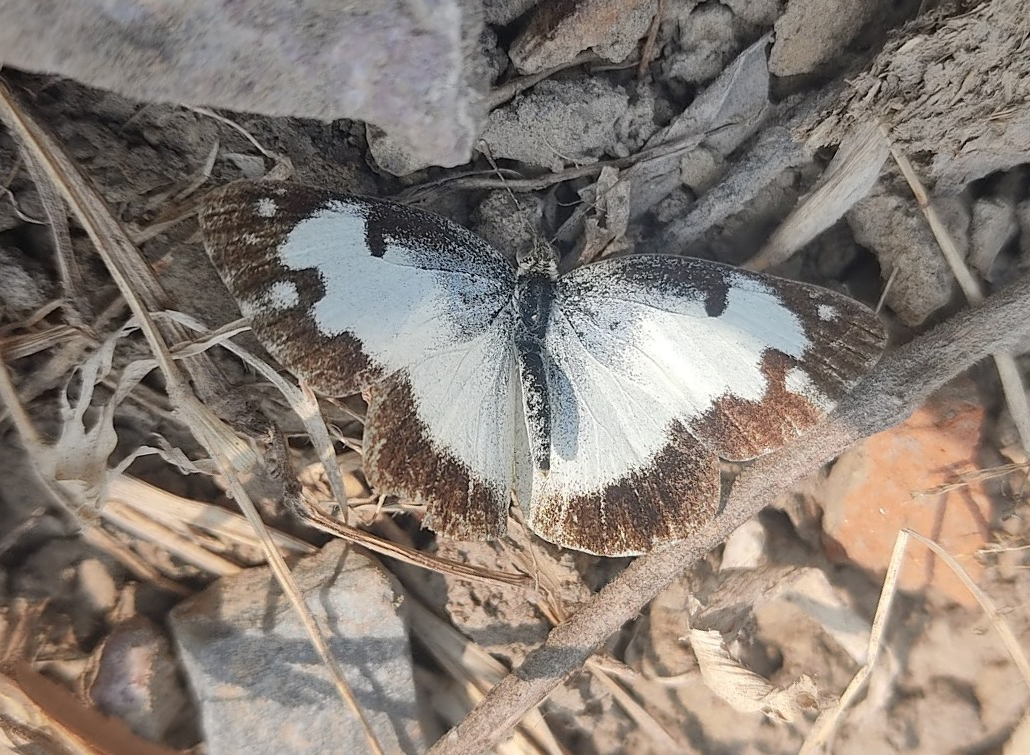
- Upperside
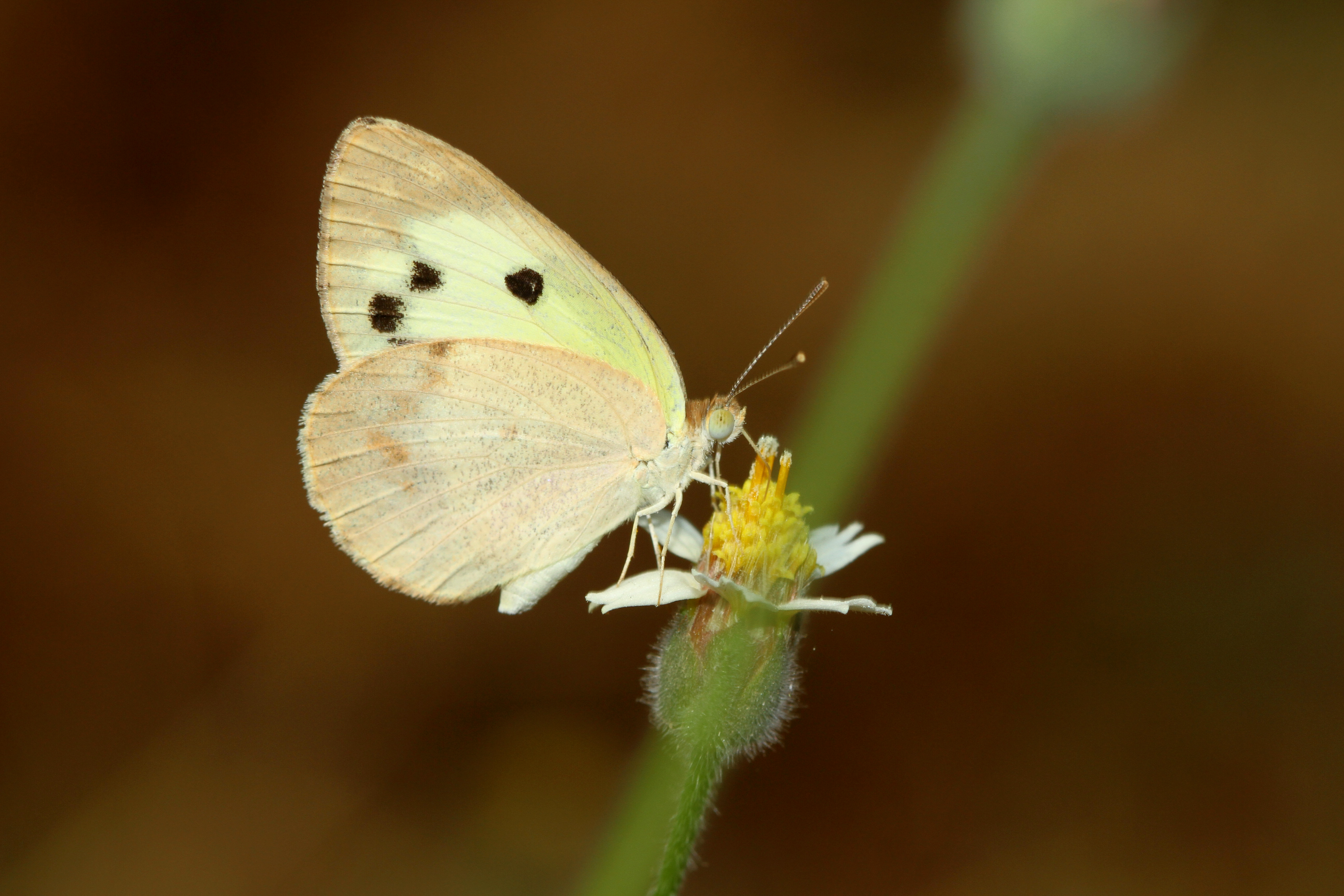
- Underside

Scientific classification
- Kingdom: Animalia
- Phylum: Arthropoda
- Clade: Pancrustacea
- Class: Insecta
- Order: Lepidoptera
- Family: Pieridae
- Genus: Colotis
- Species: C. vestalis

Binomial name
- Colotis vestalis (Butler, 1876)

Synonyms
- Teracolus vestalis Butler, 1876; Colotis (Colotis) vestalis; Idmais castalis Staudinger, 1884; Teracolus vestalis castalis f. nigricans Aurivillius, 1910; Teracolus castalis f. pallida Niepelt, 1937; Colotis vestalis castalis f. diminuta Talbot, 1939; Colotis vestalis castalis f. sabulosa Talbot, 1939; Teracolus puellaris Butler, 1876; Teracolus ochreipennis Butler, 1876; Teracolus intermissus Butler, 1883; Teracolus rorus Swinhoe, 1884; Teracolus peelus Swinhoe, 1884; Teracolus dubius Swinhoe, 1884

= Colotis vestalis =

Species of butterfly

Colotis vestalis, the white Arab, is a small butterfly of the family Pieridae, that is, the yellows and whites, which is found in India, Pakistan, Iran, Somalia, Ethiopia, Sudan, Kenya and Tanzania. It has a wingspan of 4–5 cm.

== Description ==
=== Wet-season brood ===
The male has a white ground colour on the upperside, and the forewings and hindwings have broad terminal black bands. The forewing base, costal margin broadly and discoidal cell except at its lower apical area are heavily irrorated (speckled) with dusky-grey scales with a short streak at upper apex of cell joined to a large spot on the discocellulars, black; superposed on the black terminal area are two small preapical spots and a much larger subterminal spot in interspace 3, all of the white ground colour; minute white terminal specks also, often more or less obsolescent, in the interspaces. Hindwing more uniform, very slightly irrorated with grey scales at base, the black terminal band immaculate. Underside: greenish yellow sparsely sprinkled with black scales, the yellow very pale on the disc of the forewing, fading to white along its dorsal margin; discocellular spot and three subterminal posterior spots, that are placed in a curve, black; the lowest spot of the three sometimes extended to the dorsal margin (var. puellaris). Hindwing: uniform, with a very small annular spot on the discocellulars. Cilia white. Antennae, head, thorax and abdomen black, the antennae speckled and tipped with white, the thorax clothed with long bluish-grey hairs; beneath: palpi, thorax and abdomen white.

The female upperside is very similar to that of the male, with her terminal bands broader and brownish rather than black. The female's underside base and cellular area on forewing white are suffused with greenish yellow, while the costa and apex of forewing and the whole surface of the hindwing are pale ochraceous. The forewing has black spots as in the male, while the hindwing in a few specimens has an anterior, discal, somewhat obscure, macular, incomplete band. Antennae, head, thorax and abdomen are the same as in the male.

=== Dry-season brood ===
Similar to the wet-season brood, but on the upperside the black markings are duller in tint and narrower, while on the underside in both sexes the costal and apical areas on the forewing and the whole surface of the hindwing vary from pale ochraceous to dark reddish ochraceous.

Variety peelus, Swinhoe, has the ground colour on the upperside pale canary yellow.

== Distribution ==
It is recorded from Baluchistan, the Punjab and western India (Kutch; Rajasthan; Sindh and Madhya Pradesh, south to parts of Northern Karnataka and Telangana). It is also found in the provinces around the Persian Gulf.

== Subspecies ==
- Colotis vestalis vestalis
- Colotis vestalis castalis (Staudinger, 1884) (Somalia, southern Ethiopia, Sudan, Kenya, north-eastern Tanzania)
- Colotis vestalis nadir Gross & Ebert, 1975

== See also ==
- List of butterflies of India (Pieridae)
