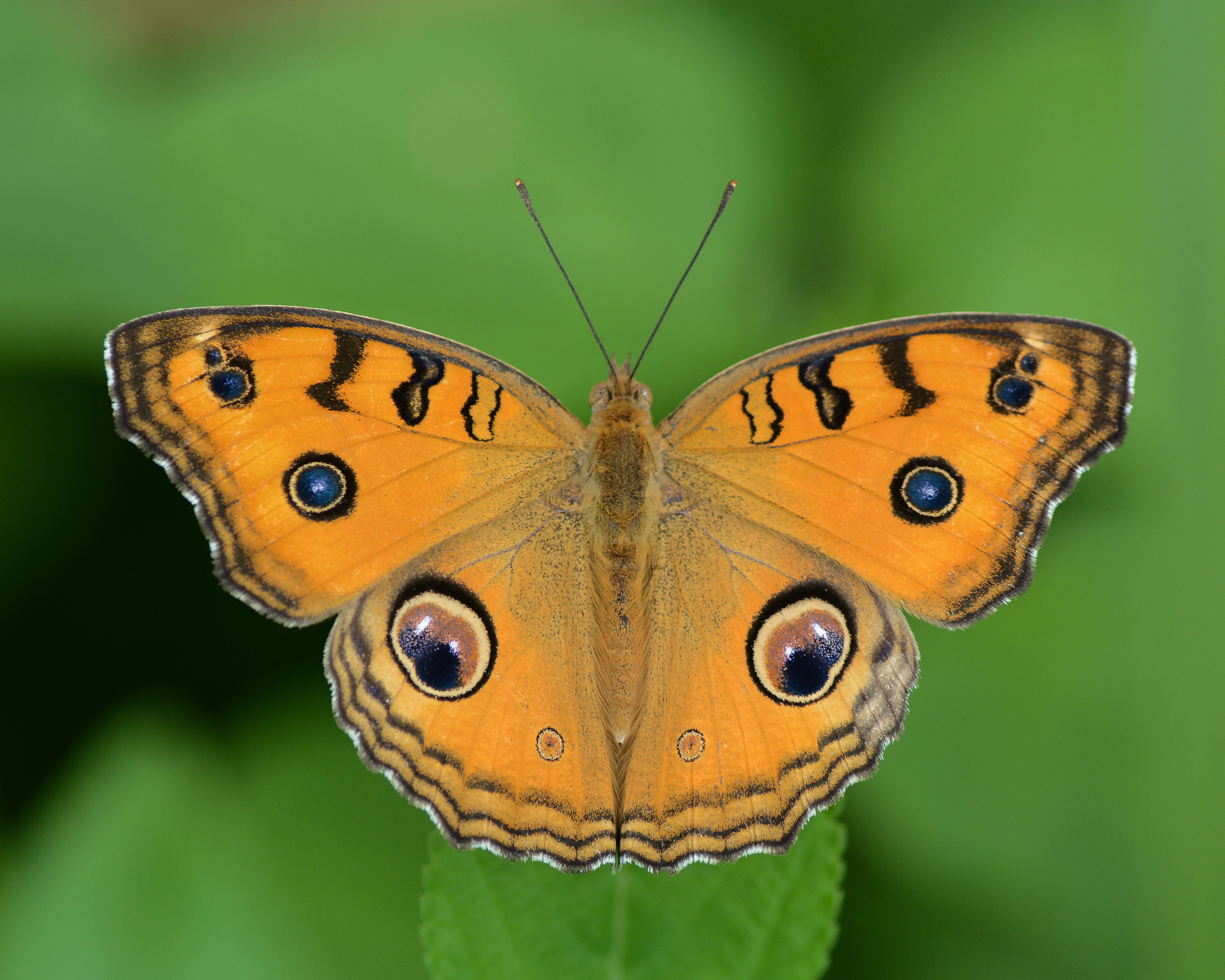

Conservation status
- Least Concern (IUCN 3.1)

Scientific classification
- Kingdom: Animalia
- Phylum: Arthropoda
- Class: Insecta
- Order: Lepidoptera
- Family: Nymphalidae
- Genus: Junonia
- Species: J. almana

Binomial name
- Junonia almana (Linnaeus, 1758)

Synonyms
- Papilio almana Linnaeus, 1758; Papilio asterie Linnaeus, 1758; Junonia asterie var. nikobariensis Felder, 1862

= Junonia almana =

Peacock pansy

Species of nymphalid butterfly found in South Asia

Junonia almana, the peacock pansy, is a species of nymphalid butterfly found in Cambodia and South Asia. It exists in two distinct adult forms, which differ chiefly in the patterns on the underside of the wings; the dry-season form has few markings, while the wet-season form has additional eyespots and lines. It is listed as Least Concern in the IUCN Red List.

== Description ==
The adult butterfly has a wingspan of 54–62 mm (2.1–2.4 in), and exhibits seasonal polyphenism.

=== Dry-season form ===
"Upperside rich orange-yellow. Fore wing with a pale dusky and a much darker short transverse bar with lateral jet-black marginal lines across cell, another somewhat similar bar defining the discocellulars; costal margin, an inner and an outer subterminal line, and a terminal line dusky black; a large minutely white-centred ocellus with an inner slender and outer black ring on disc in interspace 2; two similar but smaller geminate subapical ocelli with an obscure pale spot above them and a short oblique bar connecting them to the black on the costa. Hind wing: a small minutely white-centred and very slenderly black-ringed discal ocellus in interspace 2, with a very much larger pale yellow and black-ringed ocellus above it spreading over interspaces 4, 5 and 6, the centre of this ocellus inwardly brownish orange, outwardly bluish black, with two minute white spots in vertical order between the two colours; finally postdiscal subterminal and terminal black sinuous lines.

"Underside ochraceous brown, very variable. In most specimens the cell of the fore wing is crossed by three dark sinuous bands, the outermost along the discocellulars; these are very faint in some; both fore and hind wings crossed by a basal and a discal pale sinuous line, the latter margined outwardly by a dark shade, which is traversed by an obscure somewhat obsolescent row of dark spots, and outwardly bounded by a subterminal sinuous line, the dark shade in many cases spreading on the fore wing to the terminal edge of the wing; on the hind wing the subterminal line meets the discal in an acute angle at the tornus. Antennae dark brown; head, thorax and abdomen more or less orange-brown; paler beneath."

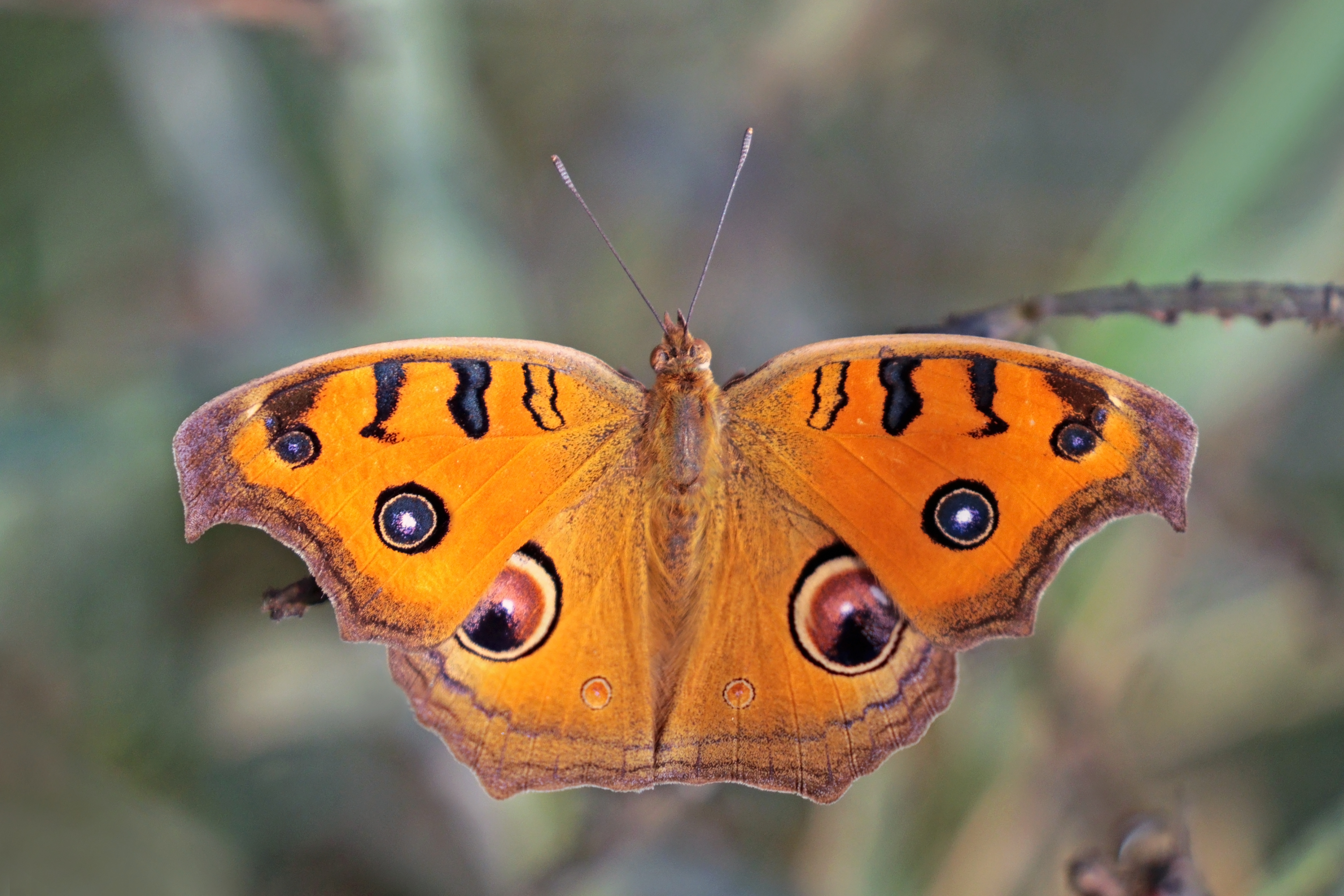
Dry season form

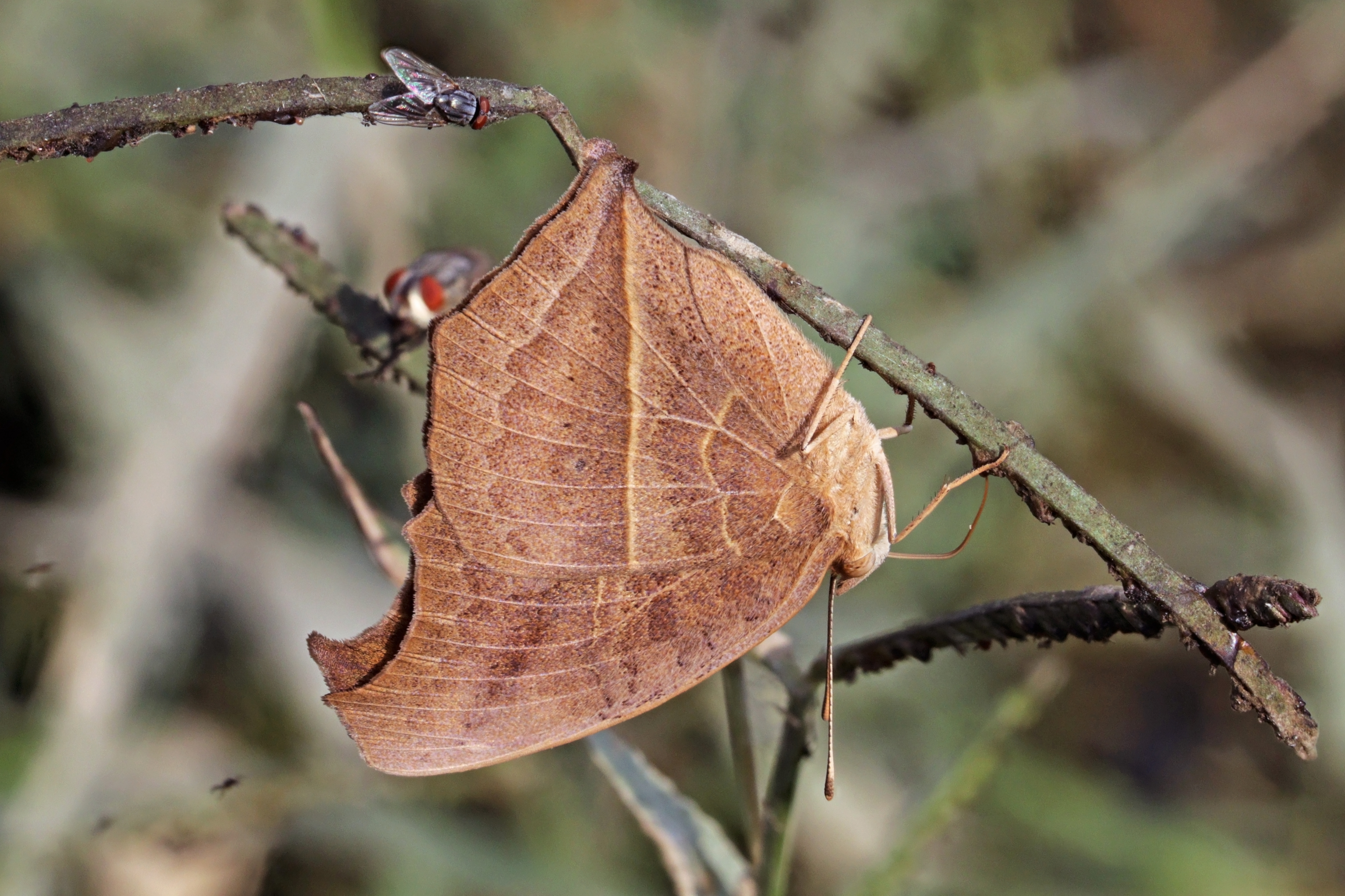
Underside, dry season form

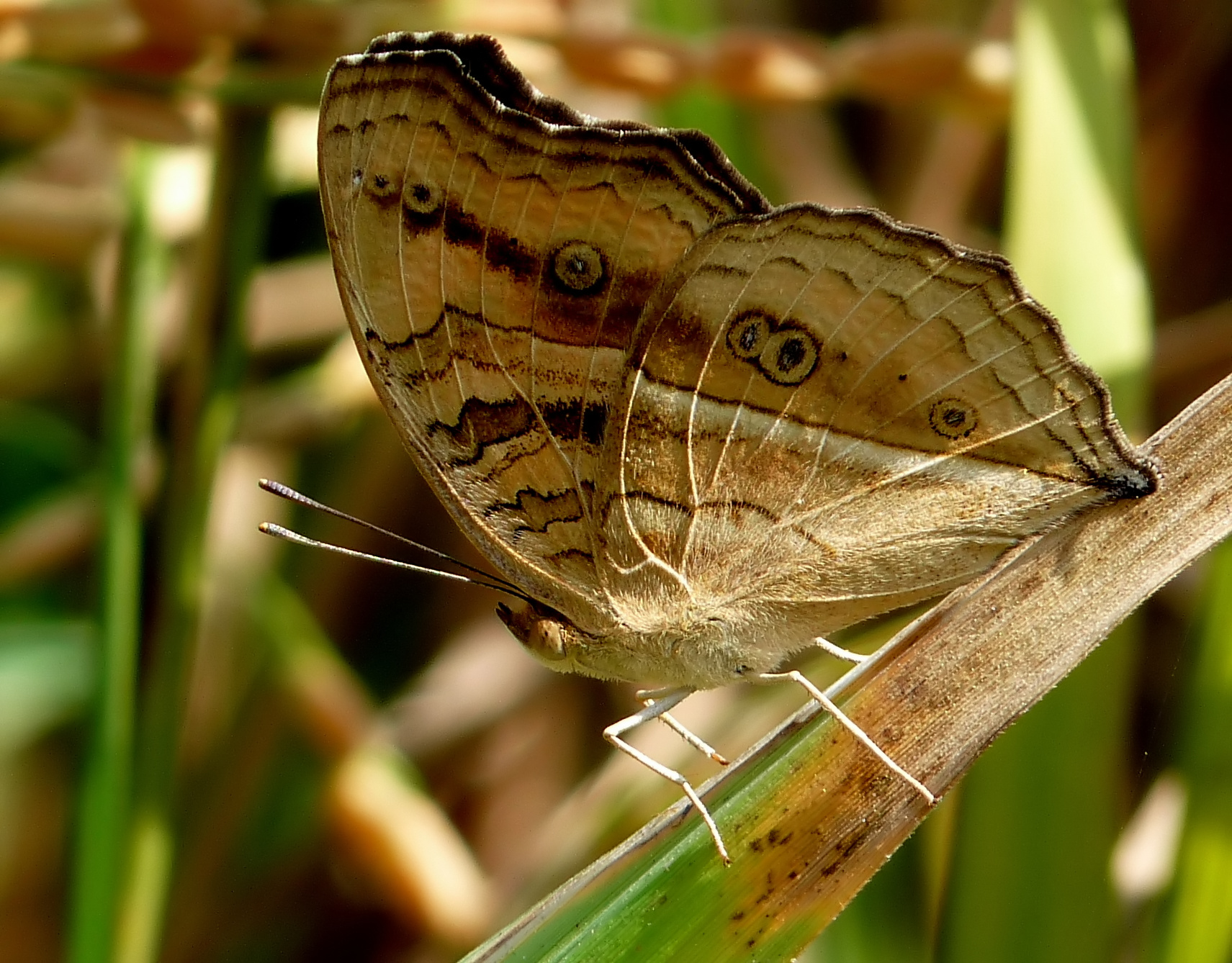
Underside, wet season form

=== Wet-season form ===
"Upperside similar, the black markings deeper in colour and heavier, the subterminal and terminal lines more clearly defined.

"Underside pale ochraceous. Fore wing: cell crossed by live short sinuous dark brown lines, a similar line on the discocellulars and another beyond it, both bent inwards at an angle and continued to the dorsum, the space between them forming a discal broad fascia, which pales to whitish posteriorly; the postdiscal ocelli, subterminal and terminal lines as on the upperside but paler. Hind wing: a slender transverse subbasal dark line, a discal whitish straight fascia in continuation of the one on the fore wing; the postdiscal ocelli, the subterminal and terminal lines much as on the upperside but paler; the anterior ocellus with a double iris and centre. Antennae dark brown; head, thorax and abdomen slightly darker than in the dry-season form."

== Distribution ==
J. almana is found in India, Sri Lanka and South East Asia, and eastwards to China and Japan.

== Larva ==
The caterpillars of Junonia almana feed on a variety of plants, including Hygrophila auriculata, Phyla nodiflora and species in the genera Acanthus, Barleria and Gloxinia.

"Cylindrical. Head blackish, slightly hairy. Body pale ochreous-brown, with a dorsal, subdorsal and lateral blackish line, and a row of small-ringed spots below the latter; second segment anteriorly with a transverse reddish stripe; second, third and fourth segments posteriorly with a transverse blackish stripe; second to last segment armed with a dorsal, subdorsal, and two lateral rows of short, fine-branched spines." (Frederic Moore quoted by C. T. Bingham)

== Pupa ==
"Rather short and thick; head and thorax broad, headpiece pointed beneath; thorax and abdomen dorsally with short tubercular points; colour brownish-ochraceous." (Frederic Moore quoted by C. T. Bingham)
