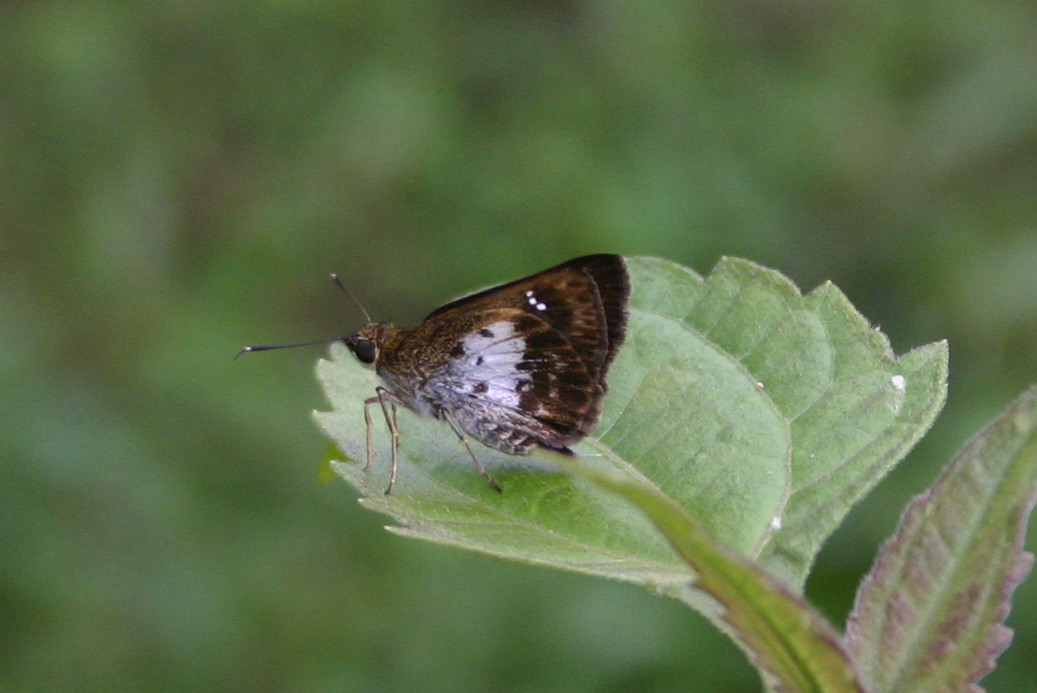
- Sovia hyrtacus

Scientific classification
- Kingdom: Animalia
- Phylum: Arthropoda
- Class: Insecta
- Order: Lepidoptera
- Family: Hesperiidae
- Subfamily: Hesperiinae
- Tribe: Aeromachini
- Genus: Sovia; Evans, 1949

= Sovia =

Genus of butterflies

Sovia is a genus of grass skipper butterflies in the family Hesperiidae. The species are found in the Indomalayan realm The genus was erected by William Harry Evans in 1949

== Species ==
- Sovia fangi Huang & Wu, 2003 – China (Yunnan)
- Sovia grahami (Evans, 1926)
  - Sovia grahami grahami Tibet, India (Assam)
  - Sovia grahami miliaohuae Huang, 2003 – China (Northwest Yunnan)
- Sovia lii Xue, 2013 - China (Shaanxi)
- Sovia liuzihaoi Huang, Wang & Fan, 2020 - China (Yunnan)
- Sovia lucasii (Mabille, 1876) – India (Sikkim), China
  - Sovia lucasii magna Evans, 1932
- Sovia malta Evans, 1949 - India (Manipur)
- Sovia separata (Moore, 1882) – India (Sikkim), Tibet
- Sovia subflava (Leech, 1894) – China (West Sichuan, Northwest Yunnan)
- Sovia wenhaoi Huang, 2019 – China (Xizang)

Transferred species:

- Sovia albipectus (de Nicéville, 1891) -> Halpemorpha albipectus in Huang et al. 2019.
- Sovia eminens Devyatkin, 1996 Vietnam. -> Halpemorpha eminens in Huang et al. 2019.
- Sovia hyrtacus (de Nicéville, 1897) - bicolor ace -> Halpemorpha hyrtacus in Huang et al. 2019.

== Biology ==
The larvae feed on Gramineae and Hibisceae including Kydia calycina
