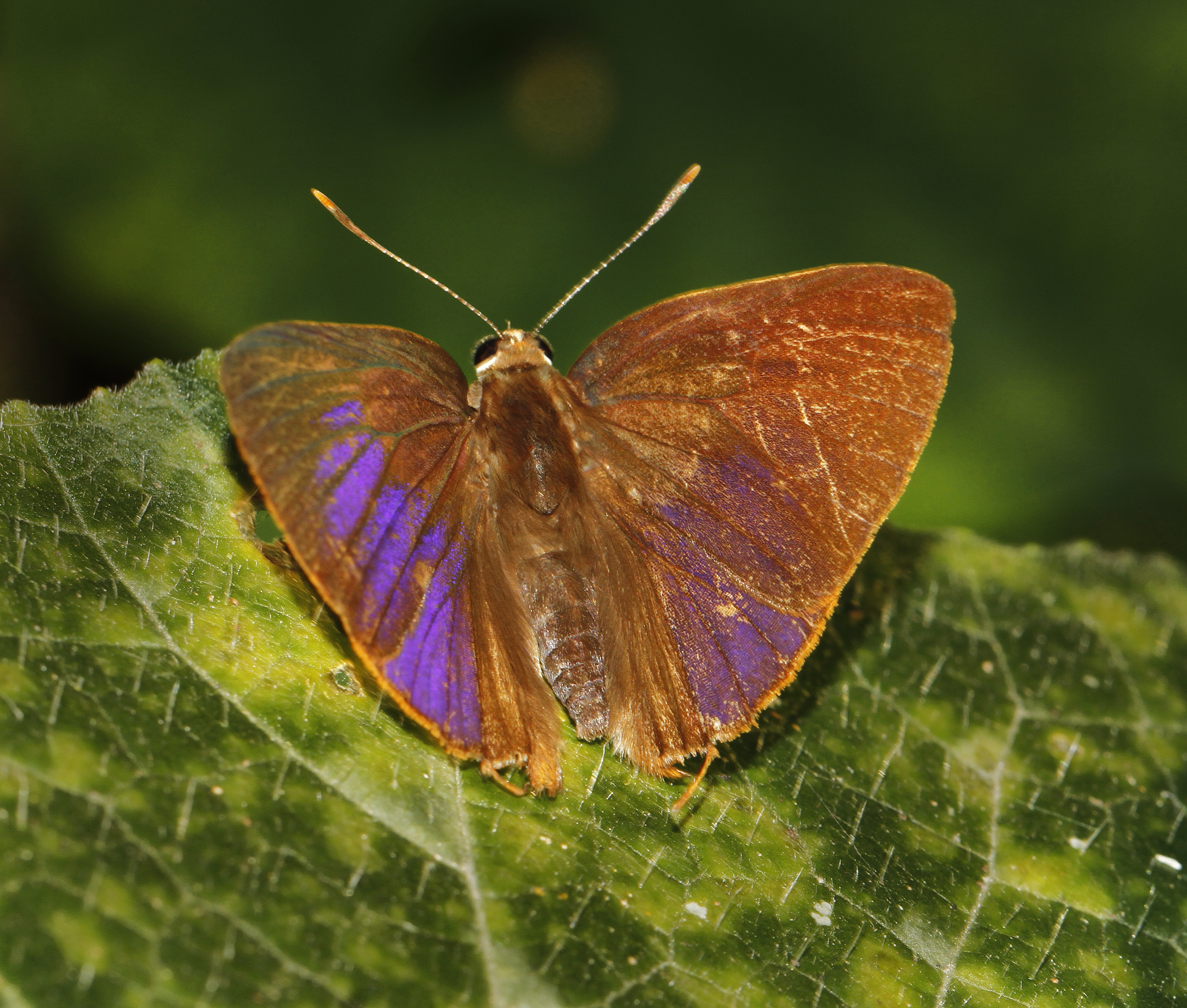
- Upper side
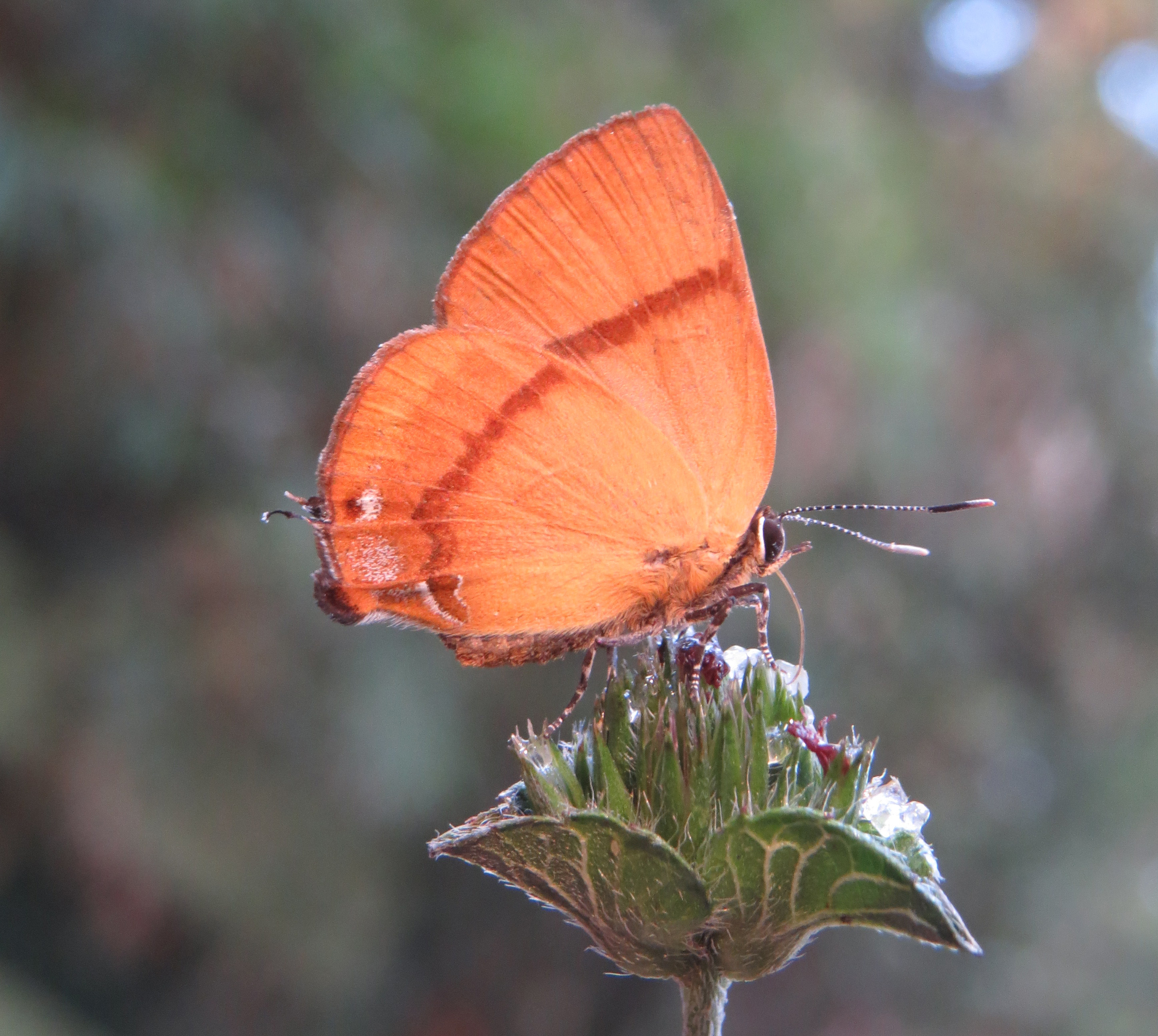
- Underside

Scientific classification
- Domain: Eukaryota
- Kingdom: Animalia
- Phylum: Arthropoda
- Class: Insecta
- Order: Lepidoptera
- Family: Lycaenidae
- Genus: Rapala
- Species: R. lankana

Binomial name
- Rapala lankana (Moore, 1879)

Synonyms
- Deudorix lankana Moore, 1879; Vadebra lankana (Moore, 1879)

= Rapala lankana =

Malabar flash

Species of butterfly

Rapala lankana, the Malabar flash, is a species of lycaenid or blue butterfly found in South India and Sri Lanka. It was first described by Frederic Moore in 1879.

== Description ==
Male: Upperside: Both wings deep purple, almost dull black, but in certain lights the whole of the hindwing and the lower discal area of the forewing glossed with magnificent rich purple. Hindwing with the anal lobe centred with ferruginous.

Underside: Both wings pale ferruginous towards the base, becoming gradually darker towards the margin. Forewing with a somewhat broad straight discal deep ferruginous band from the costa almost reaching the sub-median nervure, its outer edge very even, its inner edge a little irregular. Hindwing with a similar discal band, but posteriorly curved up to the abdominal margin; the anal lobe black, a deep ferruginous spot in the first median interspace on the margin, with some indistinct white speckles between, the discal band also bordered with white on both sides above the anal lobe.

Female: Upperside: Both wings pale violet-brown, marginal line black. Cilia pale ferruginous, at anal angle of hindwing and beyond the tail white. Hindwing with the anal lobe ferruginous, tail black.

Underside: both wings pale ferruginous, the margin darker; crossed by a narrow ferruginous-brown discal band. Hindwing with a black spot at the anal lobe and a speckled spot beyond, both of which and the end of the band are bordered with white speckles. Legs blackish, banded with white.

== See also ==
- List of butterflies of the Western Ghats
