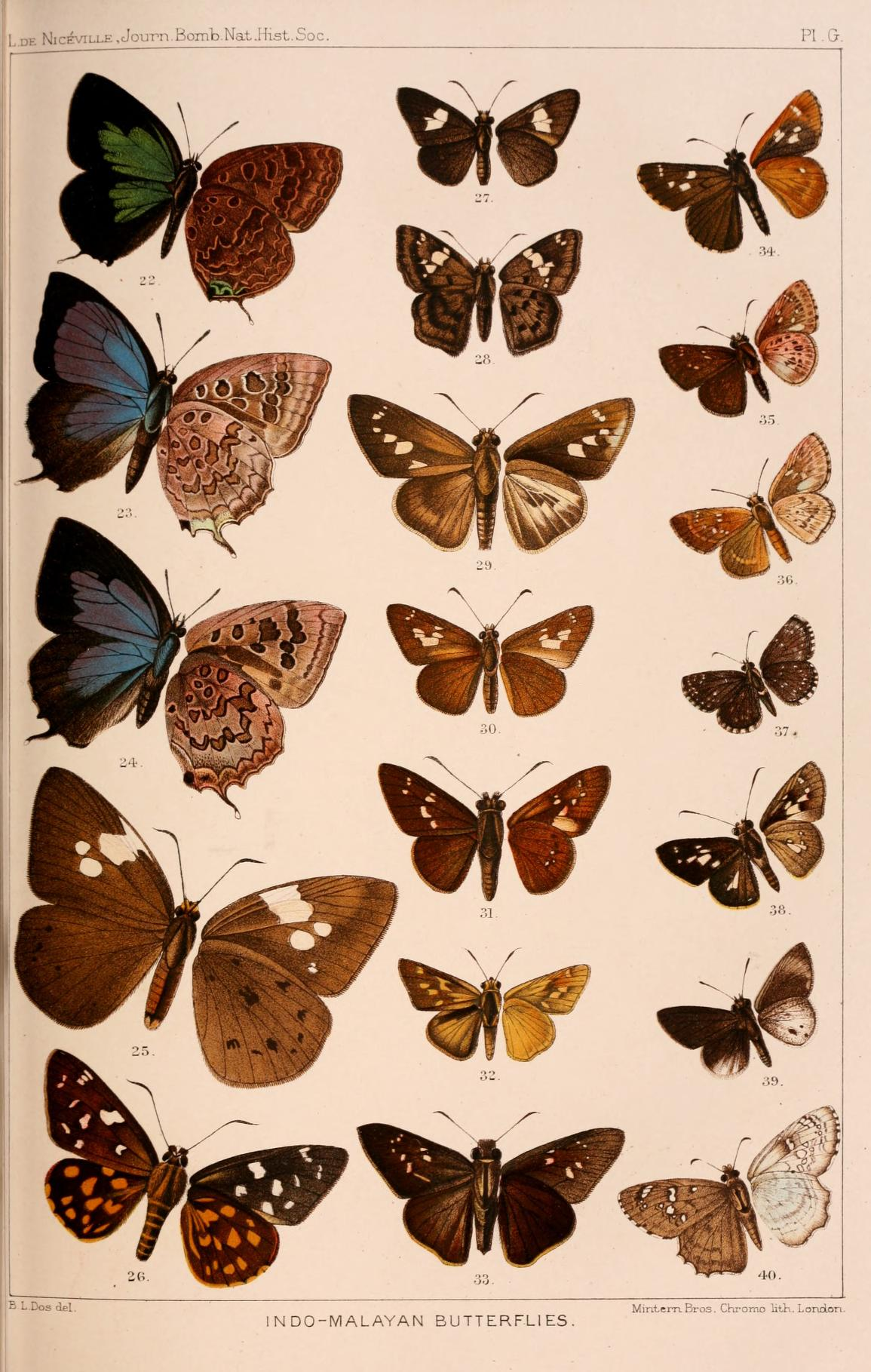
- Figures 35 and 36 from Lionel de Nicéville's 1891 "On New and Little-Known Butterflies from the Indo-Malayan Region"

Scientific classification
- Kingdom: Animalia
- Phylum: Arthropoda
- Class: Insecta
- Order: Lepidoptera
- Family: Hesperiidae
- Genus: Sovia
- Species: S. albipectus

Binomial name
- Sovia albipectus (de Nicéville, [1891])

Synonyms
- Halpe albipectus de Nicéville, 1891; Halpe albipectus prominens Evans, 1932

= Sovia albipectus =

Species of butterfly

Sovia albipectus is a butterfly in the family Hesperiidae. It was described by Lionel de Nicéville in 1891. It is found in the Indomalayan realm (Burma, Thailand, Laos and Yunnan).
