= Sovia malta =

Scientific classification
- Kingdom: Animalia
- Phylum: Arthropoda
- Class: Insecta
- Order: Lepidoptera
- Family: Hesperiidae
- Genus: Sovia
- Species: S. malta

Binomial name
- Sovia malta Evans, 1949

Species of butterfly

Sovia malta, also known as the Manipur ace, is a butterfly in the family Hesperiidae. It is found in Manipur in India. It was described by William Harry Evans in 1949. This species is monotypic.

== Description ==
The spot in the upperside forewing in space 2 is nearer to the cell spot than to the spot in space 3. The cell spot is narrowly rectangular. It is mostly ferruginous and unmarked on the underside, except the dorsum, which is paler. It is known from only 5 males and 13 females collected from Kabru, Manipur by Harry Tytler in July 1911.
