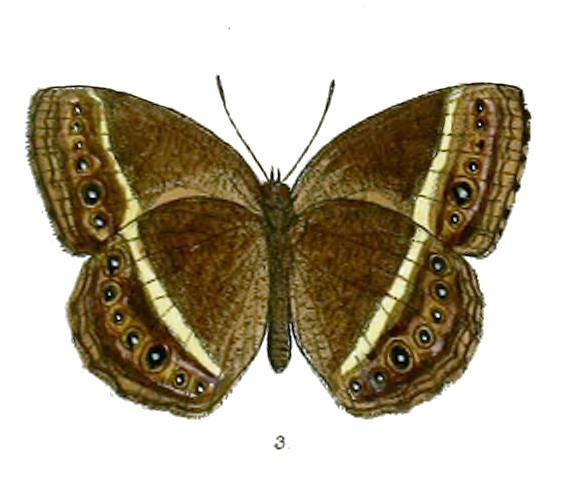
- as illustrated in Lepidoptera Indica
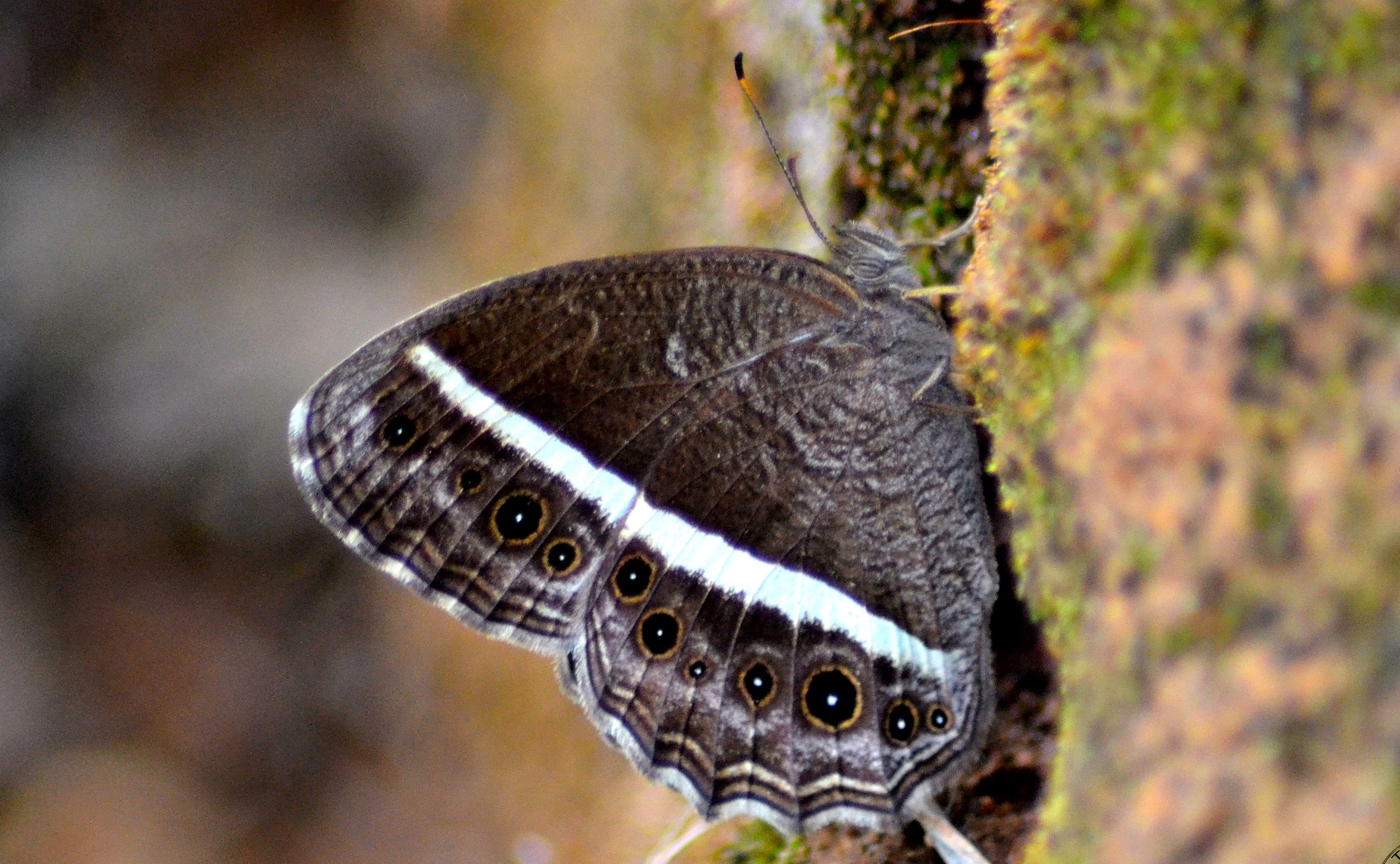
- from Kerala

Scientific classification
- Kingdom: Animalia
- Phylum: Arthropoda
- Class: Insecta
- Order: Lepidoptera
- Family: Nymphalidae
- Genus: Telinga
- Species: T. davisoni

Binomial name
- Telinga davisoni (Moore, [1891])

Synonyms
- Samanta davisoni Moore, [1891]; Mycalesis davisoni (Moore, [1891])

= Telinga davisoni =

Palni bushbrown

Species of butterfly

Telinga davisoni, the Palni bushbrown, is a species of satyrine butterfly found in southern India. Some authors consider this as a subspecies of Mycalesis mamerta or Telinga malsara or Telinga lepcha.
