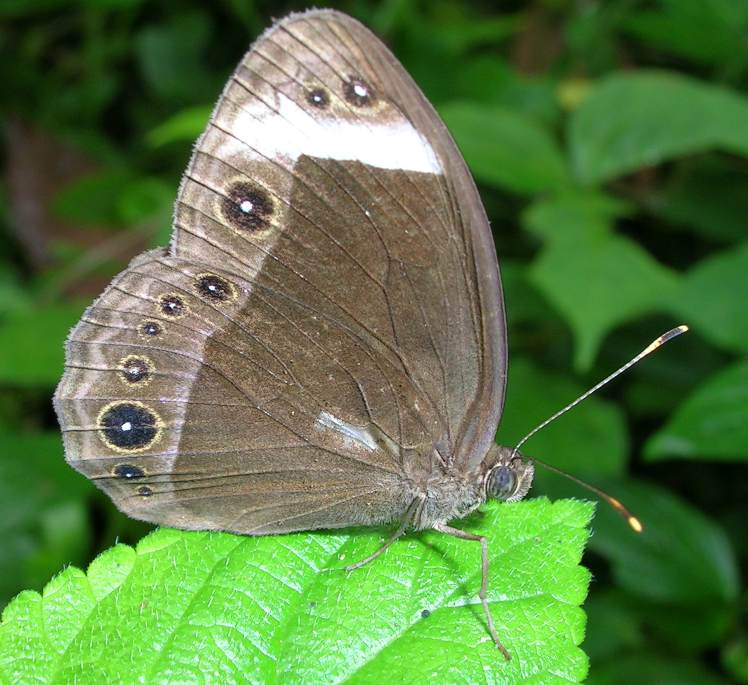
- Wet-season form

Scientific classification
- Kingdom: Animalia
- Phylum: Arthropoda
- Clade: Pancrustacea
- Class: Insecta
- Order: Lepidoptera
- Family: Nymphalidae
- Genus: Mycalesis
- Species: M. anaxias

Binomial name
- Mycalesis anaxias Hewitson, 1862

= Mycalesis anaxias =

White-bar bushbrown

Species of butterfly

Mycalesis anaxias, the white-bar bushbrown, is a species of satyrid butterfly found in South and Southeast Asia. In South Asia, it inhabits Sikkim, eastwards through the hill-ranges to Assam, Cachar, Myanmar and Tenasserim. Also in southern India, in the Nilgiris and Travancore.

== Description ==
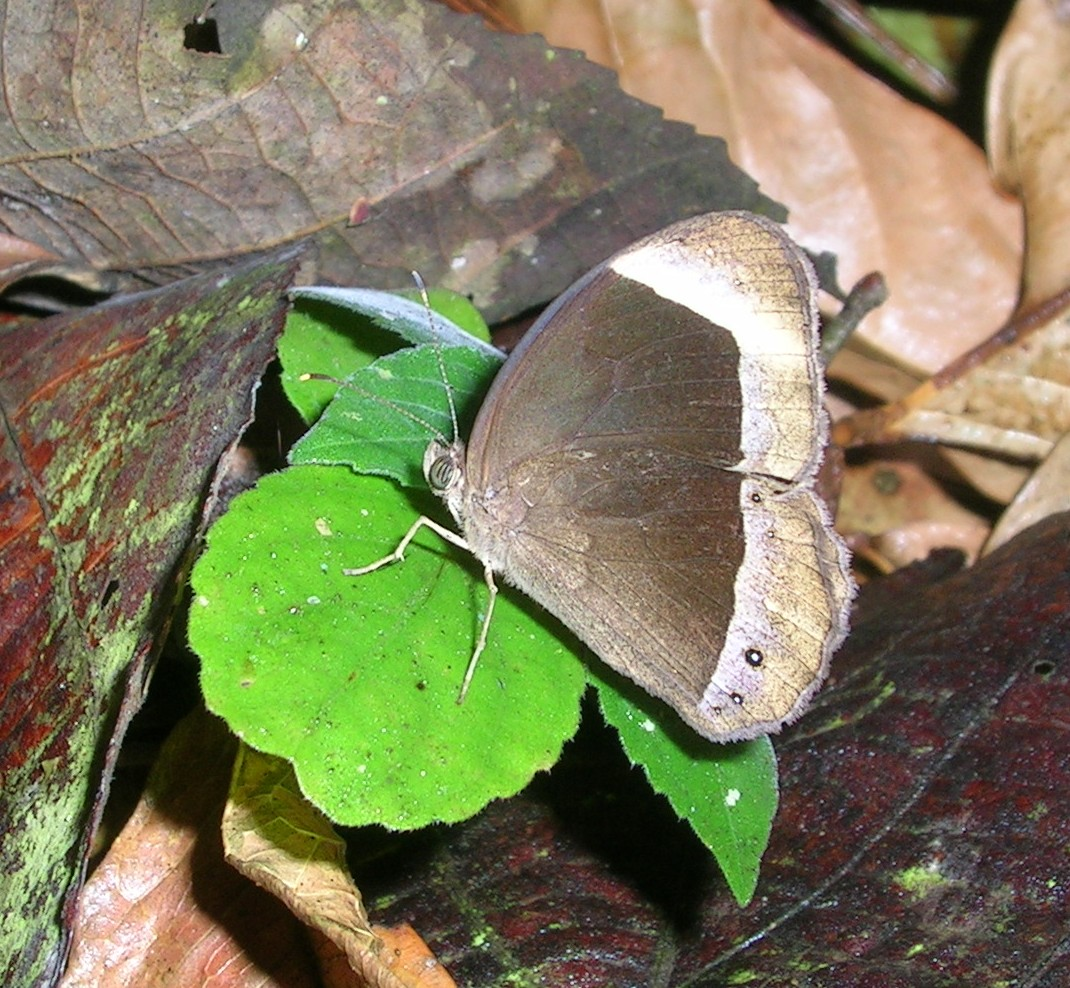
Dry-season form

Wet-season form: male and female: Upperside dull Vandyke brown, paler in the female; subterminal and terminal fine lines on both forewings and hindwings fulvescent (tawny): cilia brown. Forewing with an oblique white preapical short band not quite reaching either the costa or the termen. Underside: forewing: basal area up to the white band, and in a transverse line from lower end of band to dorsum, blackish brown; terminal margin beyond broadly paler brown; a white-centred fulvous-ringed black ocellus in interspace 2, and two preapical, smaller similar ocelli, followed by a very sinuous subterminal and a straighter terminal dark brown line. Hindwing: basal two-thirds blackish brown, terminal border broadly paler, bearing normally seven ocelli similar to those on the forewing, and subterminal and terminal dark brown lines.

Dry-season form: Upperside as in the wet-season form. Underside differs in the ocelli being indistinct or absent, and the subterminal and terminal dark lines on both forewing and hindwing absent or very faint; the terminal margins are broadly rufescent (reddish) brown, fading inwardly into lilacine, the oblique white bar on the forewing outwardly diffuse. Antennae, head, thorax and abdomen dark brown; the antennae ochraceous towards apex.

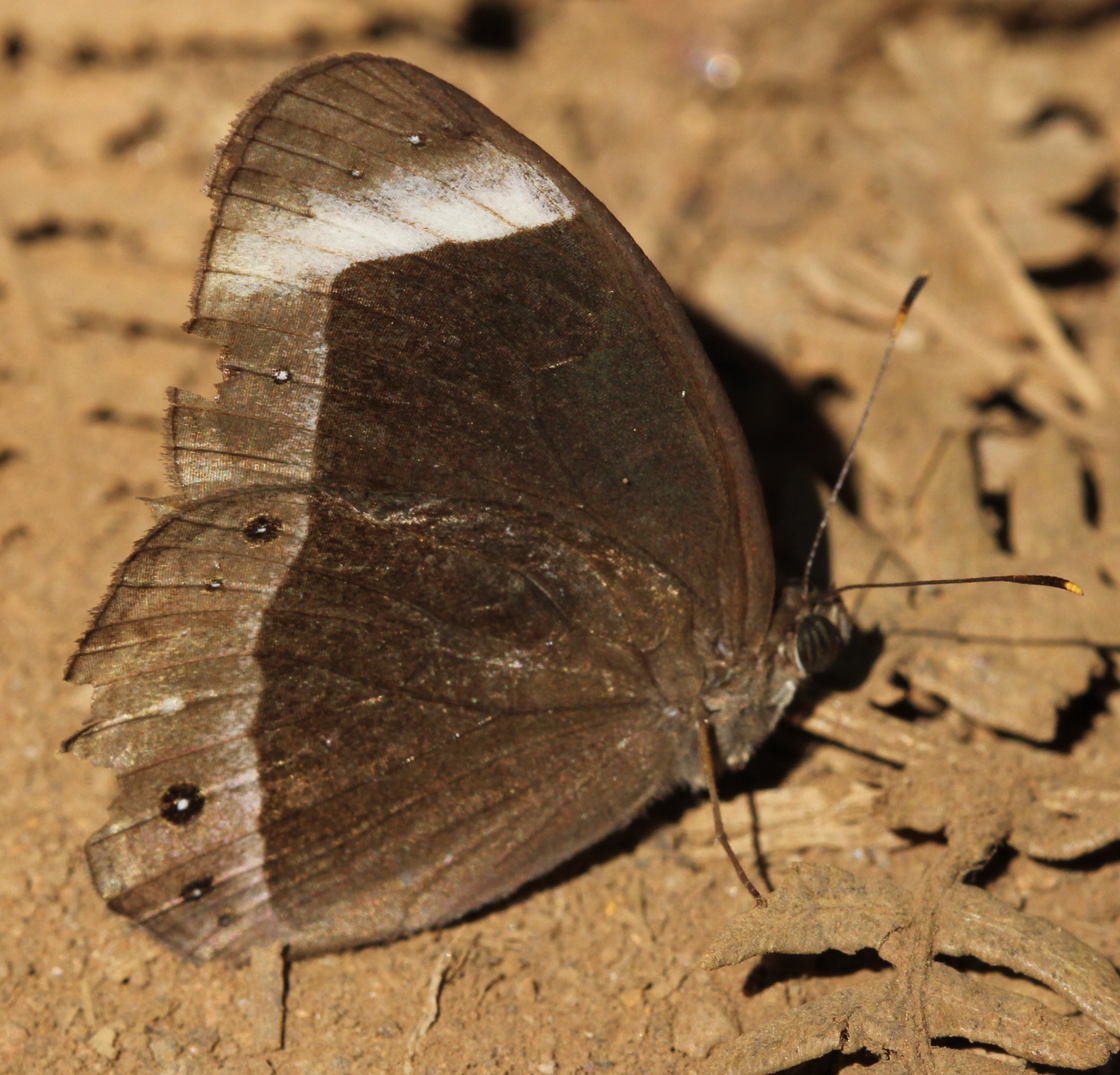
At Coorg

Wingspan: 51–60 mm. Male sex-mark in form 1.

== Gallery ==
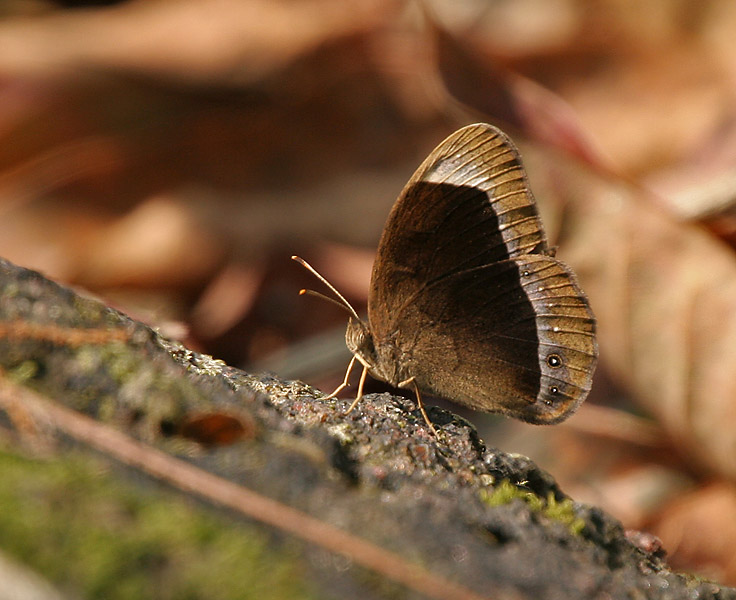
Dry-season form at Samsing in Darjeeling district of West Bengal, India

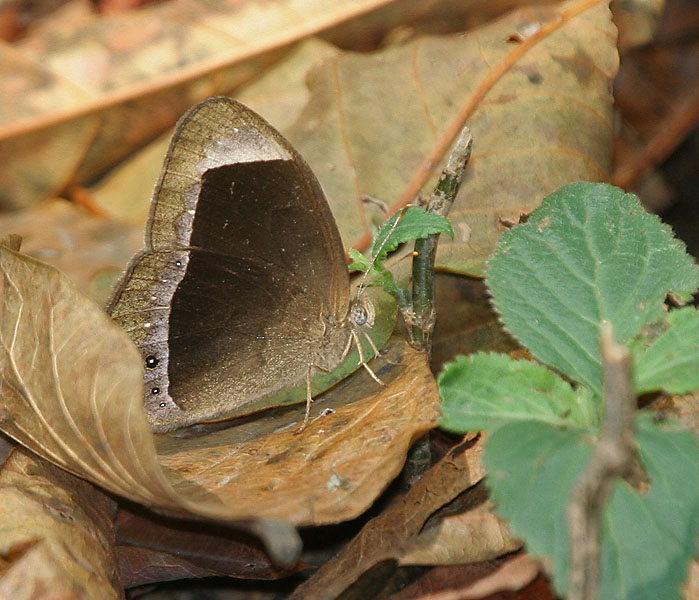
Dry-season form at Samsing in Darjeeling district of West Bengal, India
