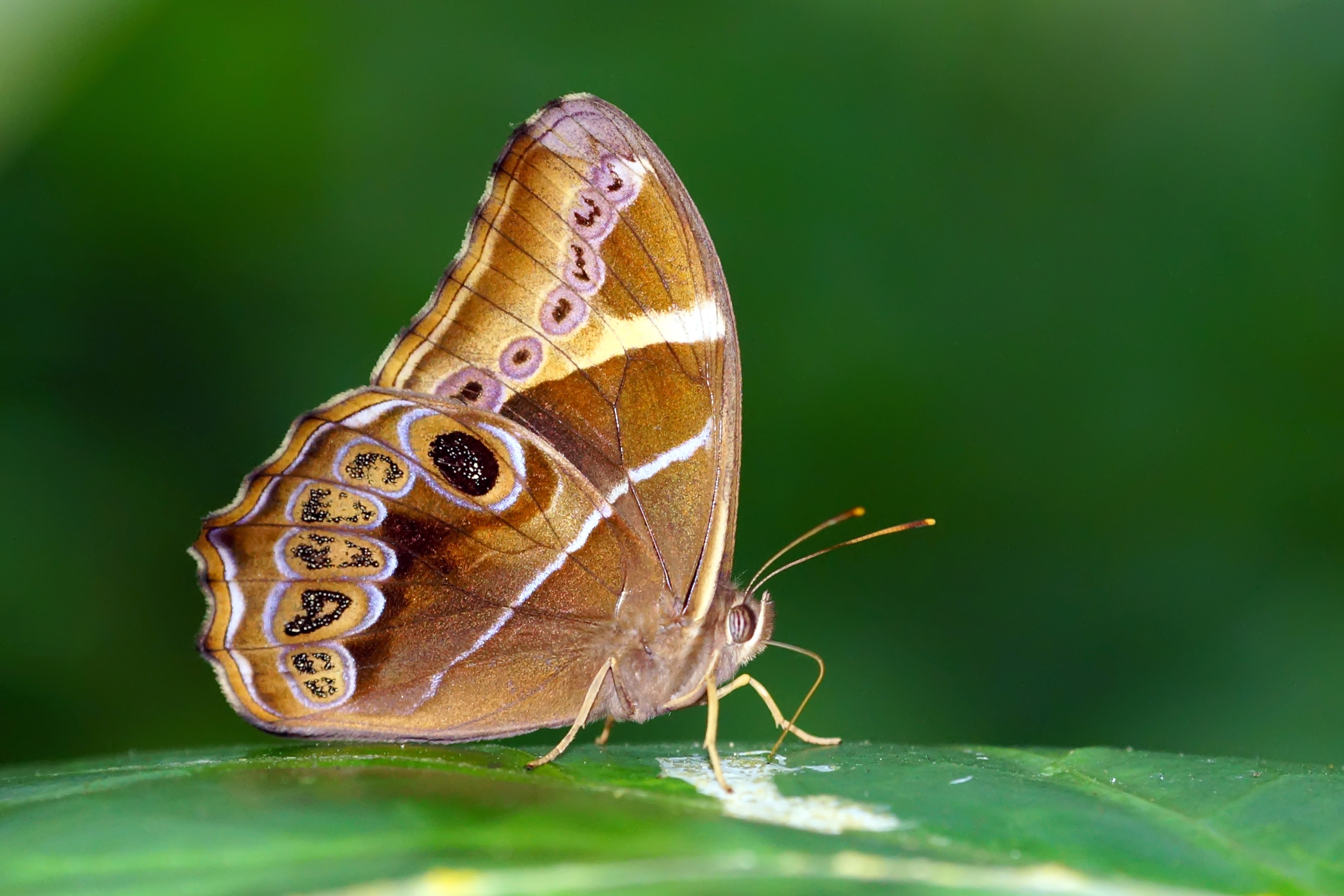

Scientific classification
- Kingdom: Animalia
- Phylum: Arthropoda
- Clade: Pancrustacea
- Class: Insecta
- Order: Lepidoptera
- Family: Nymphalidae
- Genus: Lethe
- Species: L. europa

Binomial name
- Lethe europa (Fabricius, 1787)

= Lethe europa =

Bamboo treebrown

Species of butterfly

Lethe europa, otherwise known as the bamboo treebrown, is a species of Satyrinae butterfly found in Asia.

== Description ==
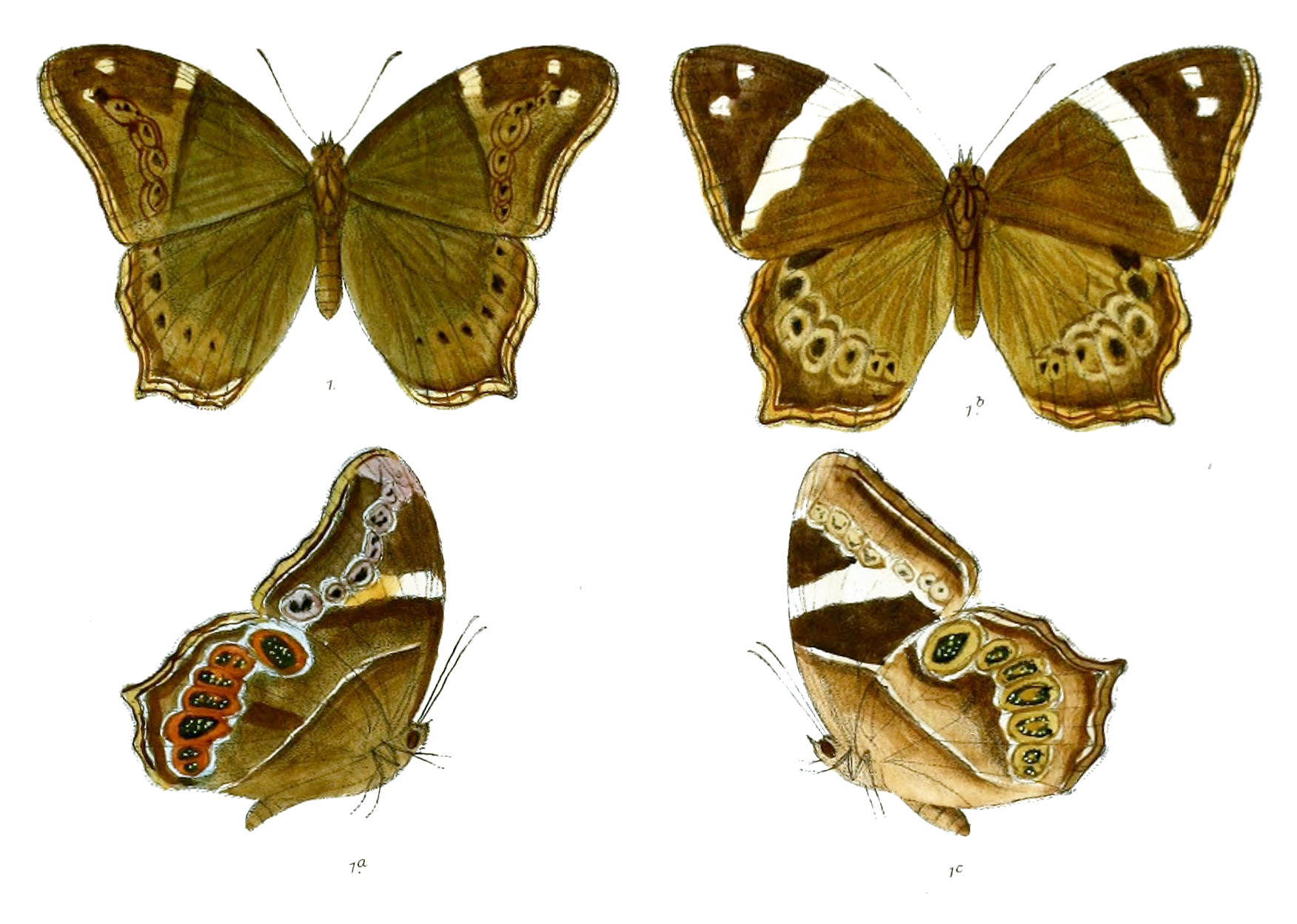
Male on the left and female on the right

=== Male ===
The inner third of the hindwing is covered with long brown hairs. The upper side is a rich dark brown, with the forewing showing through a short oblique white discal fascia from the underside. This is accompanied by two obscure black ocelli, followed by two prominent white spots, the upper of which is double. Black markings occur along the terminal margins of both forewing and hindwing, outwardly bordered with pale dusky brown, with an obscure subterminal pale line on the hindwing.

The underside is a very dark blackish brown. Both wings are crossed sub-basally by a slender lilacine-white straight line, followed on the forewing by an oblique short white discla fascia. A postdiscal series of large black ocelli is present on both wings, with a terminal narrow ochraceous band bordered internally by a silvery-purple line. These ocelli are further bordered by inwardly and outwardly curving silvery-purple lunular lines; on the forewing these curve inward, while on the hindwing they curve outward. The forewing ocelli are confluent, black, and without pupils, whereas those on the hindwing are black with irregular silvery-speckled, partially disintegrated centers on a brown background.

=== Female ===
The female is similar to the male but is distinguished by a broader oblique white discal band on the upper side of the forewing and an incomplete postdiscal series of black spots on the hindwing. The underside is similar to that of the male, but the markings and ocelli are generally larger.

=== Subspecies variation ===
Lethe europa tamuna was first described on Little Nicobar Island by Michael Lloyd Ferrar in 1931. Since then, it has also been recorded on the Campbell Bay area of Great Nicobar Island. Adults and larvae have been observed in disturbed forest habitats along roadsides. The larvae feed on bamboo (Dinochloa andamanica), with eggs laid within the interior of bamboo clumps, typically on leaves situated deep inside rather than on exposed outer foliage.

== Life history ==
=== Larva ===
Green, paler beneath, fusiform in shape. Head bearing a single short, erect horn. Body attenuated abruptly from the 11th segment.

=== Pupa ===
Uniform pale green, stout and smooth, with an otherwise regular form. The head case is semi-detached, broad, and angular, bearing two sharp anterior points (after Davidson & Aitken).

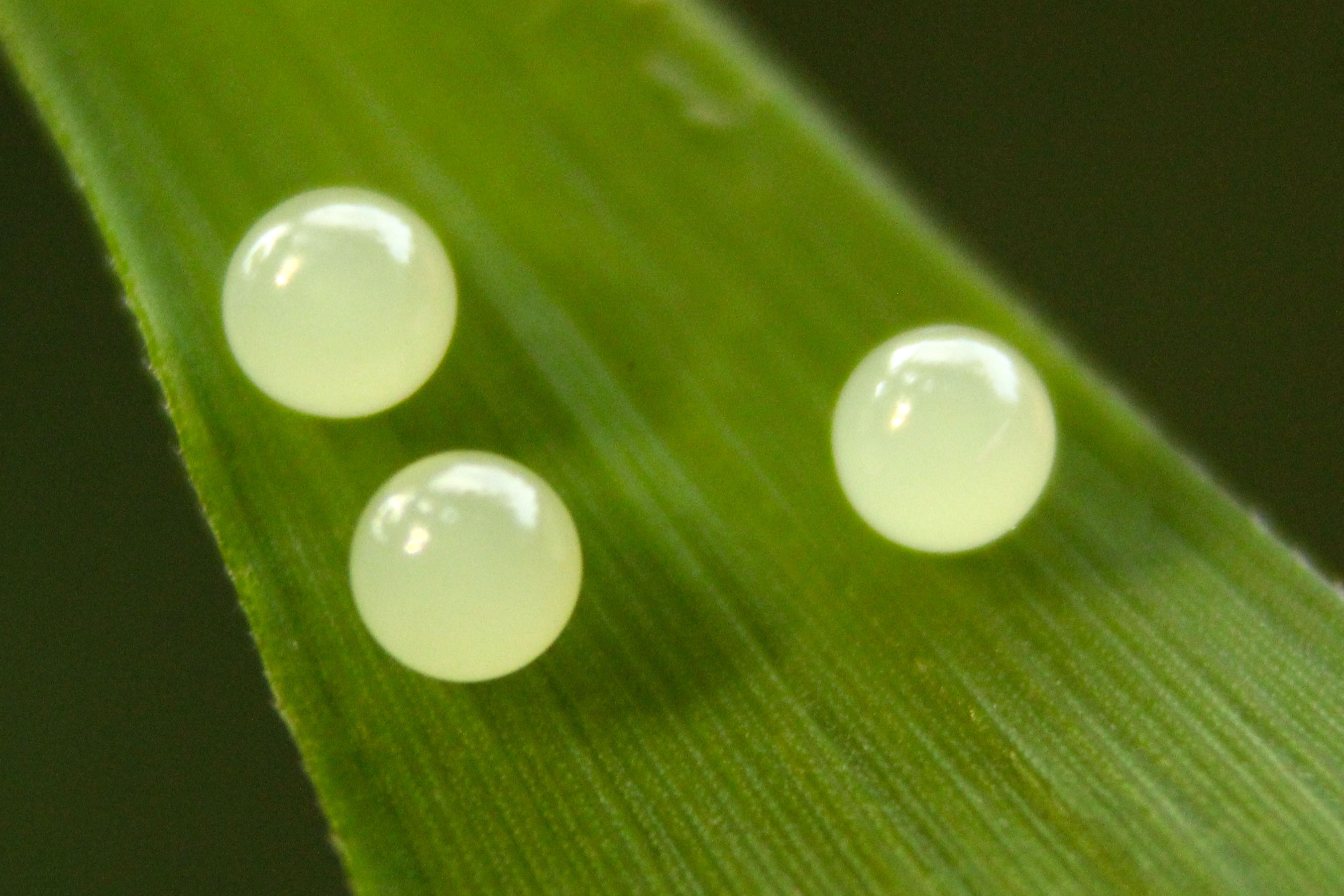
Eggs

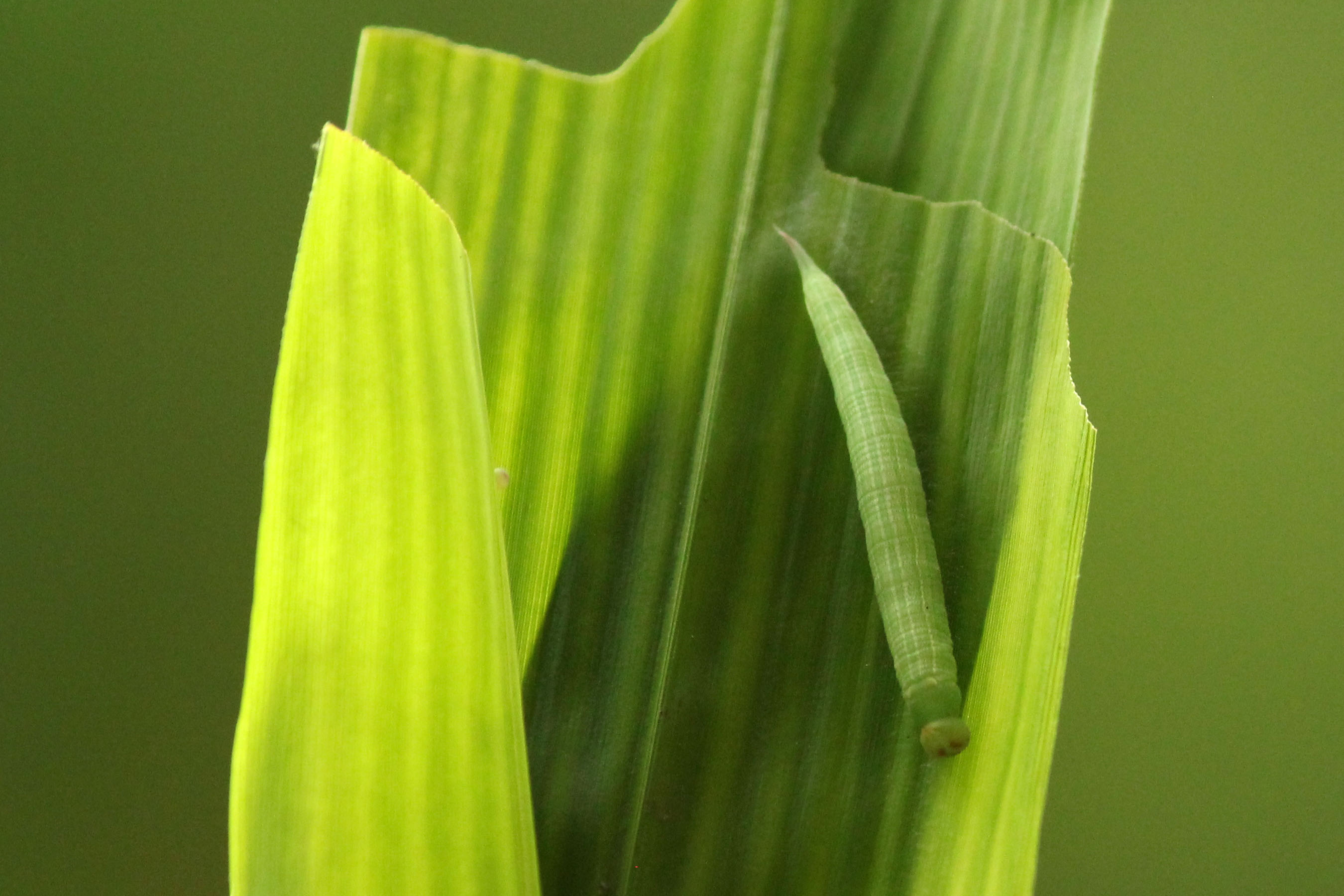
Larva

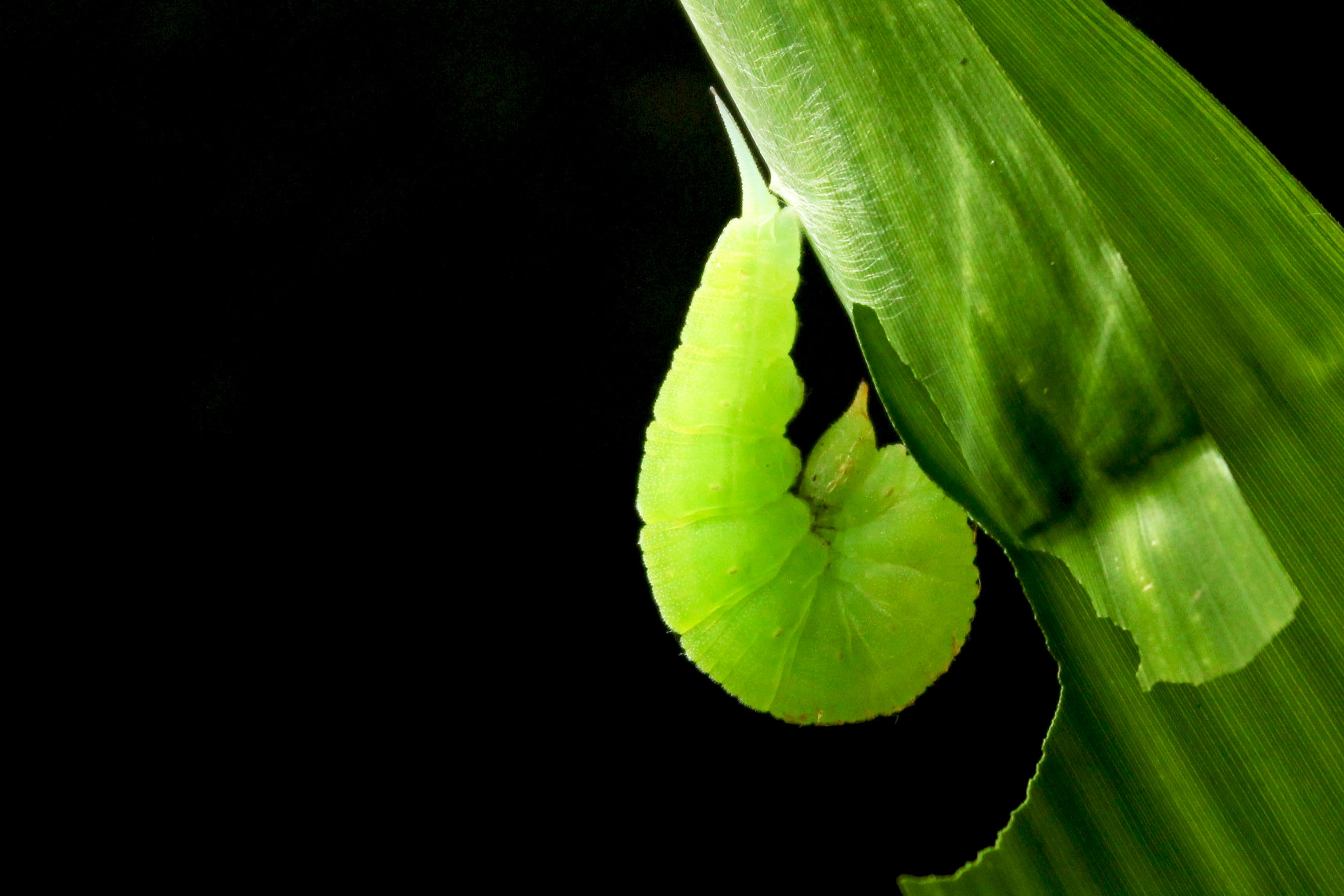
Pre-pupatory larva

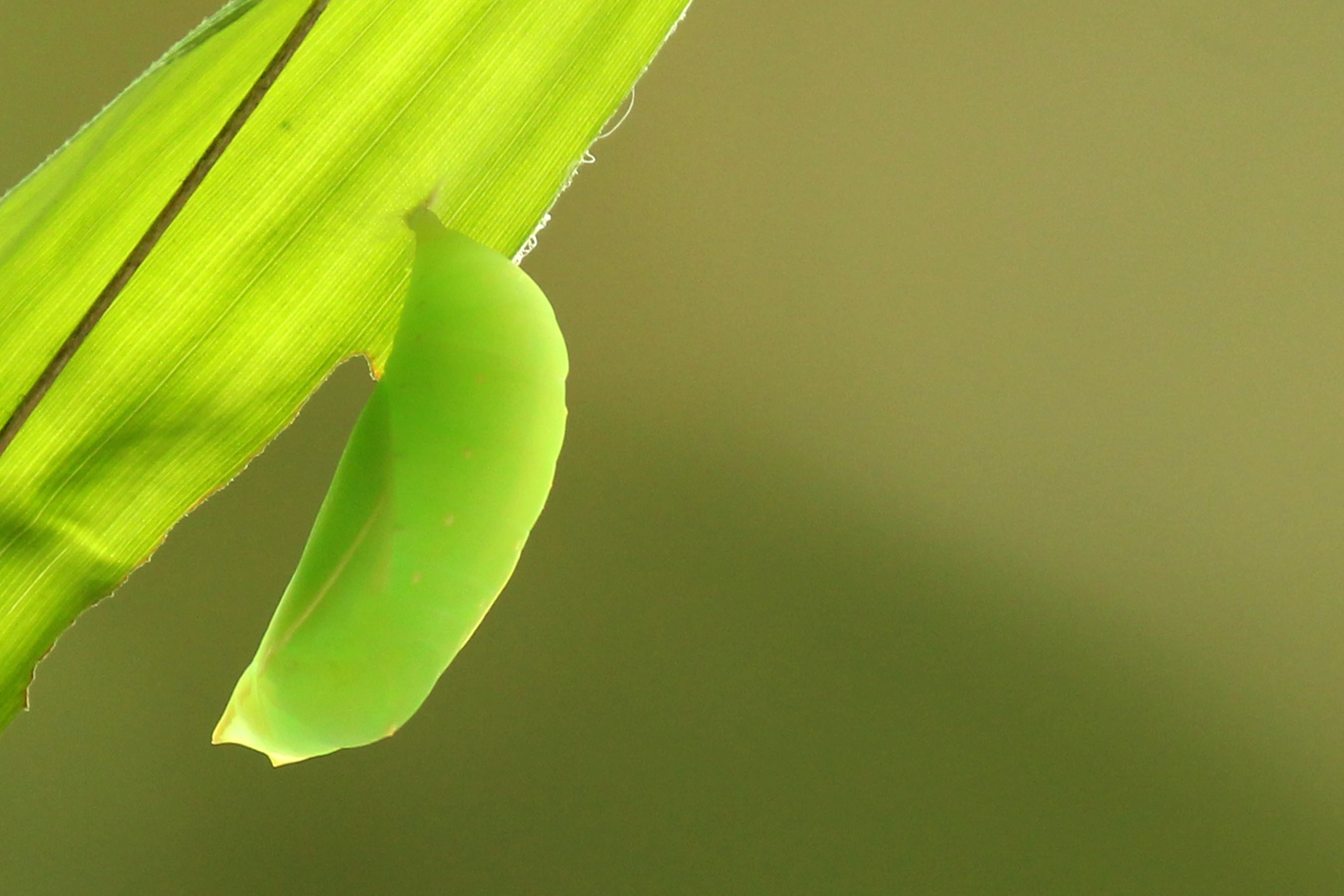
Pupa

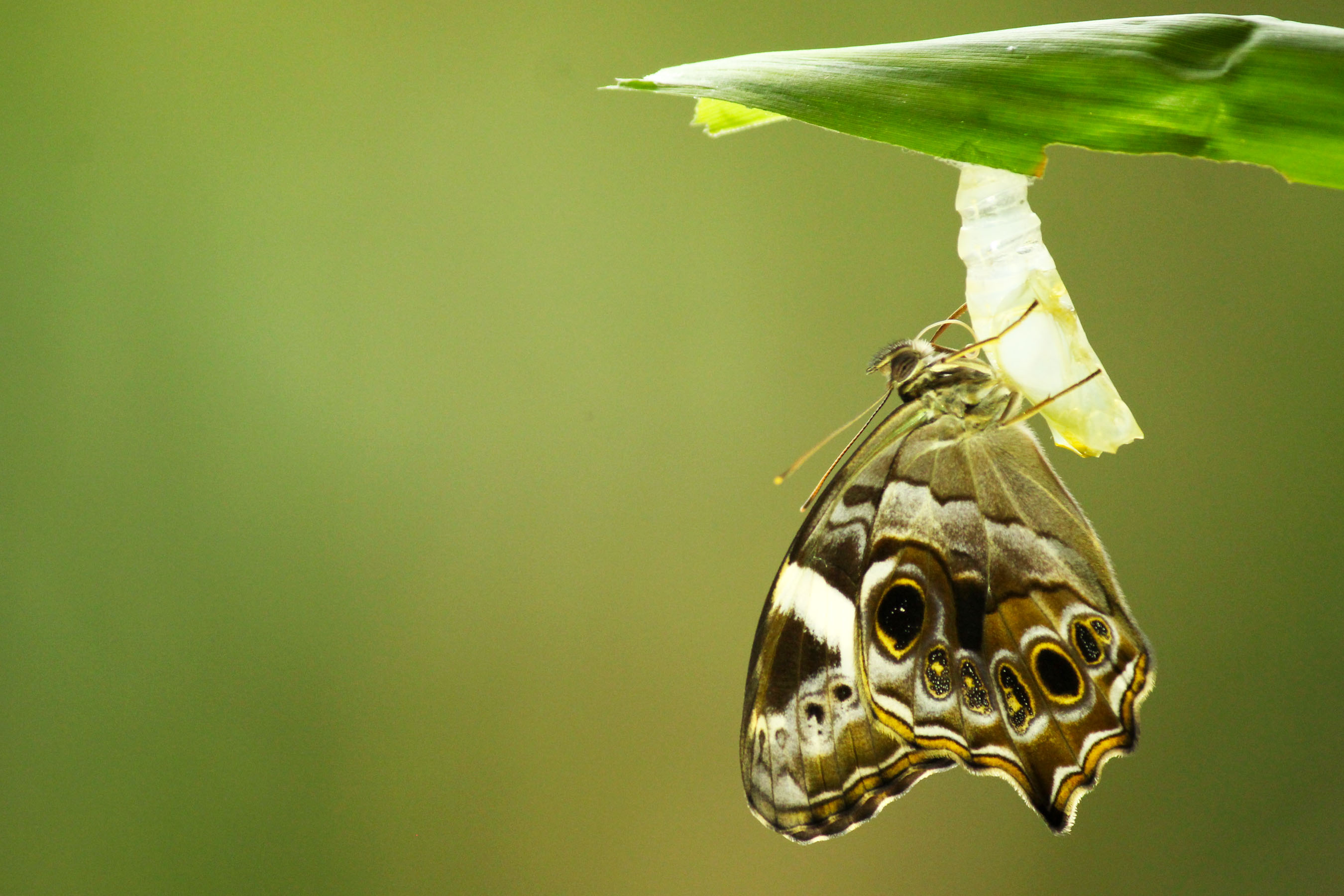
Newly eclosed adult

== Gallery ==
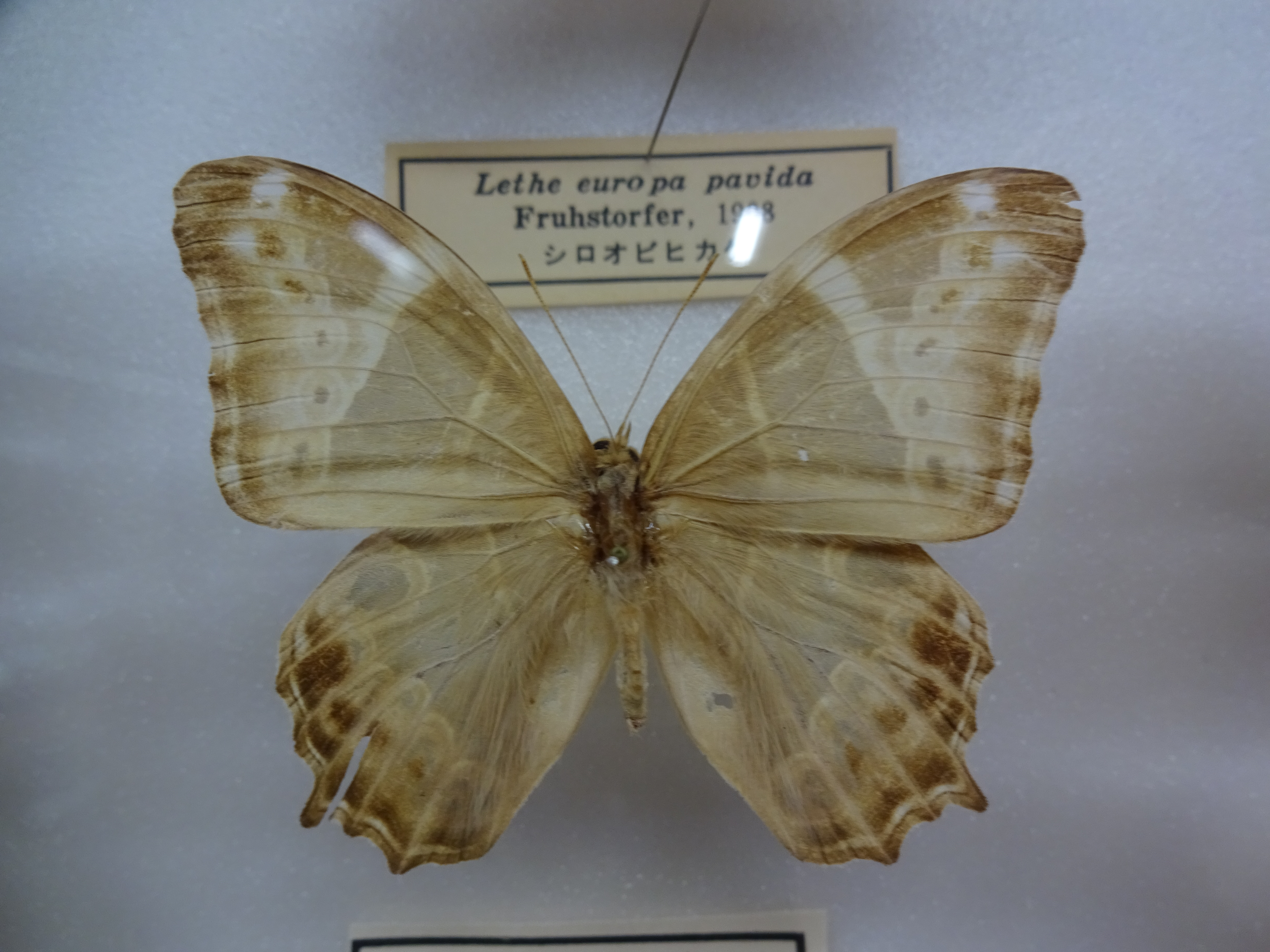
Dorsal view (male)

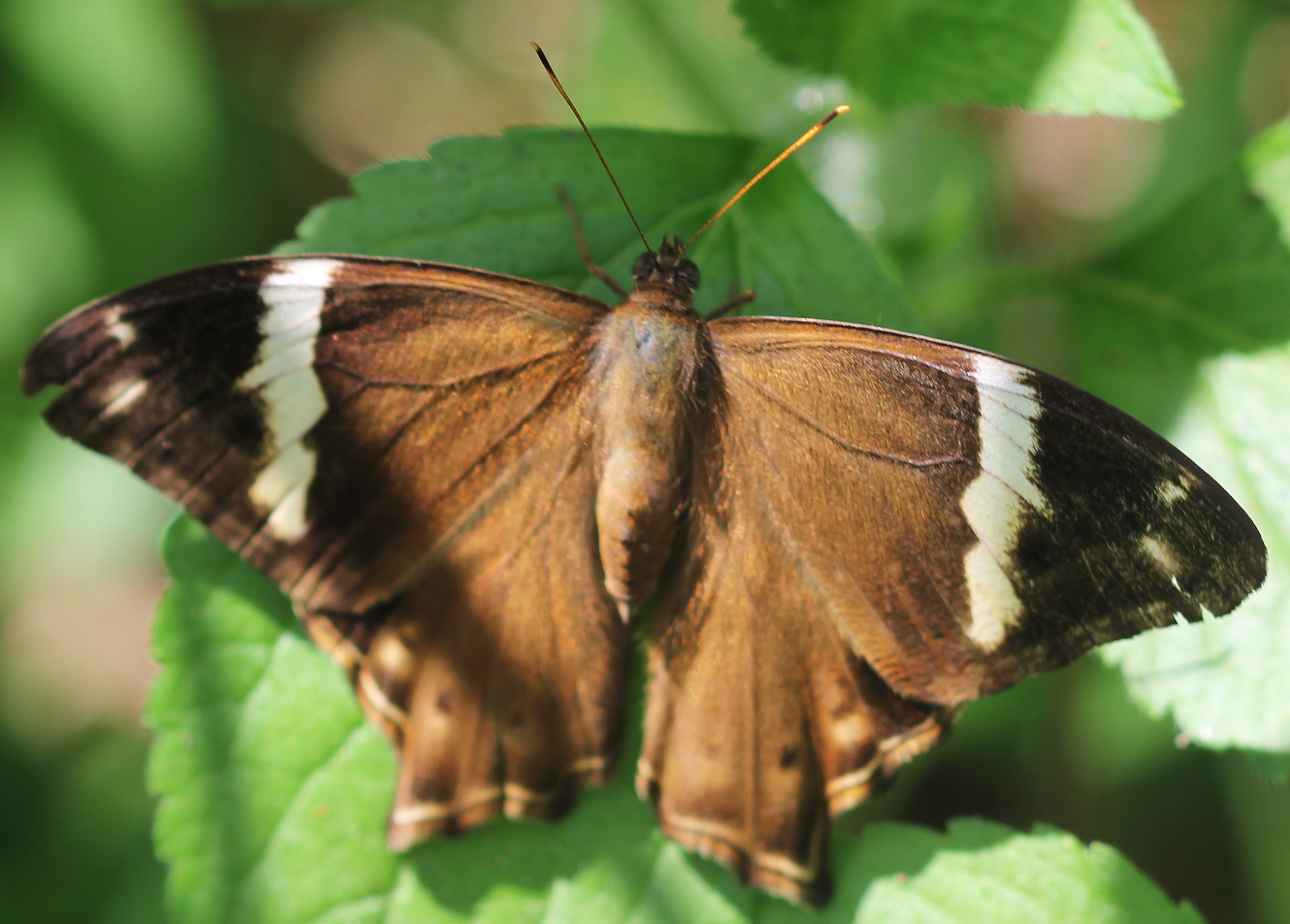
Dorsal view (female)

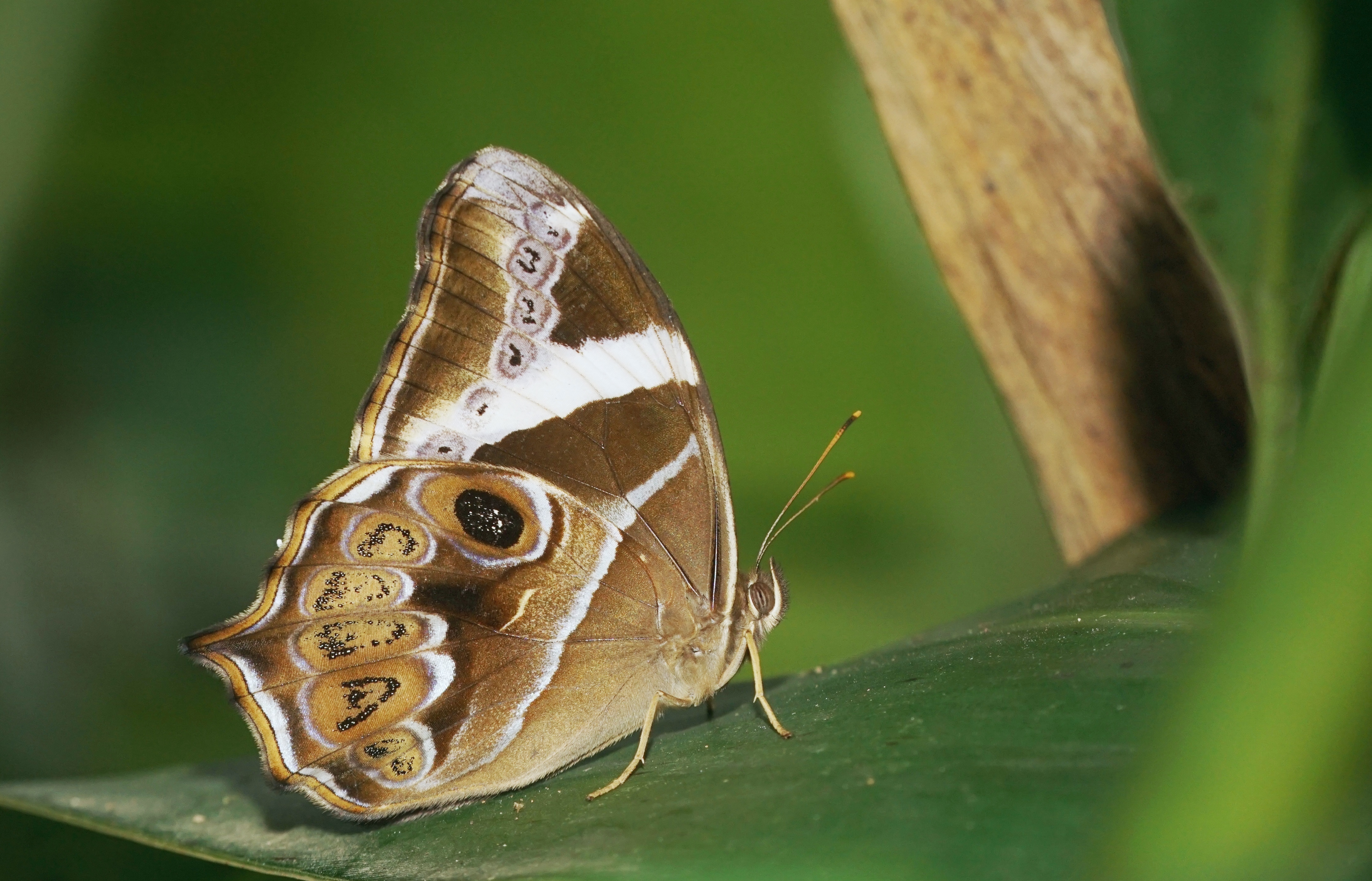
Side view (female)
