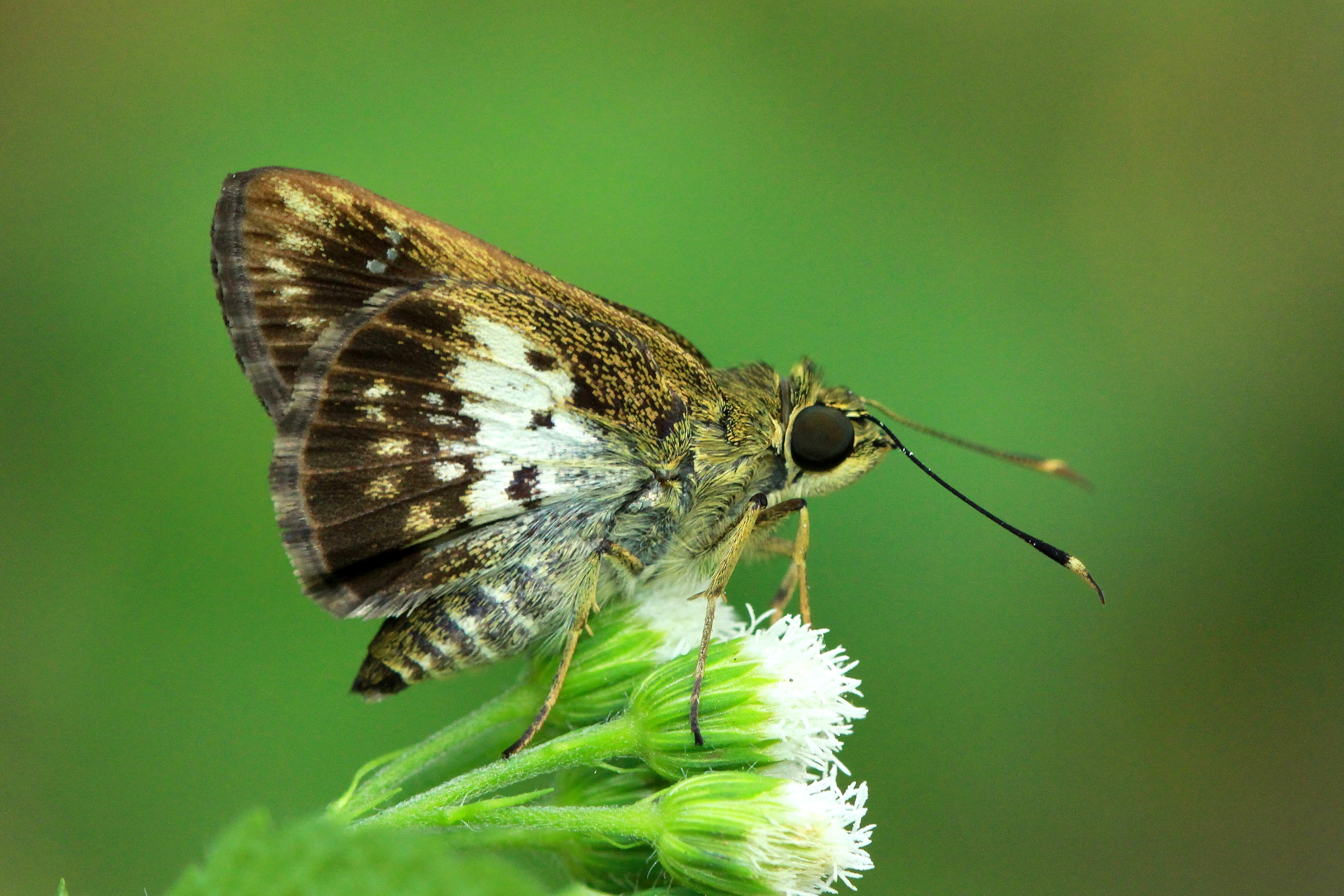

Scientific classification
- Kingdom: Animalia
- Phylum: Arthropoda
- Clade: Pancrustacea
- Class: Insecta
- Order: Lepidoptera
- Family: Hesperiidae
- Genus: Halpemorpha
- Species: H. hyrtacus

Binomial name
- Halpemorpha hyrtacus (de Nicéville, 1897)

Synonyms
- Sovia hyrtacus

= Halpemorpha hyrtacus =

Bicolour ace

Species of butterfly

Halpemorpha hyrtacus, the bicolour ace or white-branded ace, is a butterfly belonging to the family Hesperiidae. It is found in Western Ghats from Goa to Kerala.

The larvae feed on Ochlandra travancorica.

== Description ==
In 1897, Lionel de Nicéville described this butterfly as:

Male. Upperside, both wings and cilia shining dark hair-brown. Forewing with two dots placed obliquely outwards towards the end of the discoidal cell, one or both sometimes absent; three conjugated subapical dots, and two on the disc at the bases of the median interspaces, all these dots colourless and transparent; the "male-mark" shining deep black and narrow. Hindwing immaculate. Underside, both wings dull fuscous. Forewing with the transparent dots as on the upperside; the inner margin very broadly white crossed in the middle by the "male-mark;" the costa outwardly tinted with ochreous; the apex bearing some obscure elongated dark dashes outwardly bordered with ochreous. Hindwing bearing a broad discal pure white band, broadest on the abdominal margin, not reaching the costa, anteriorly marked with one or two dark brown dots, sometimes with two or three in the middle; the outer dark half of the wing bearing some obscure ochreous spots. Palpi above, thorax and abdomen concolorous with the wings, beneath and legs yellowish-white. Female. Upper-side, both wings as in the male, but the ground-colour paler. Forewing with no "male-mark" Underside, both wings as in the male.

— Lionel de Nicéville
