= Bondla Wildlife Sanctuary =

Wildlife sanctuary in Goa, India

- Bondla Zoo
- IUCN category IV (habitat/species management area)
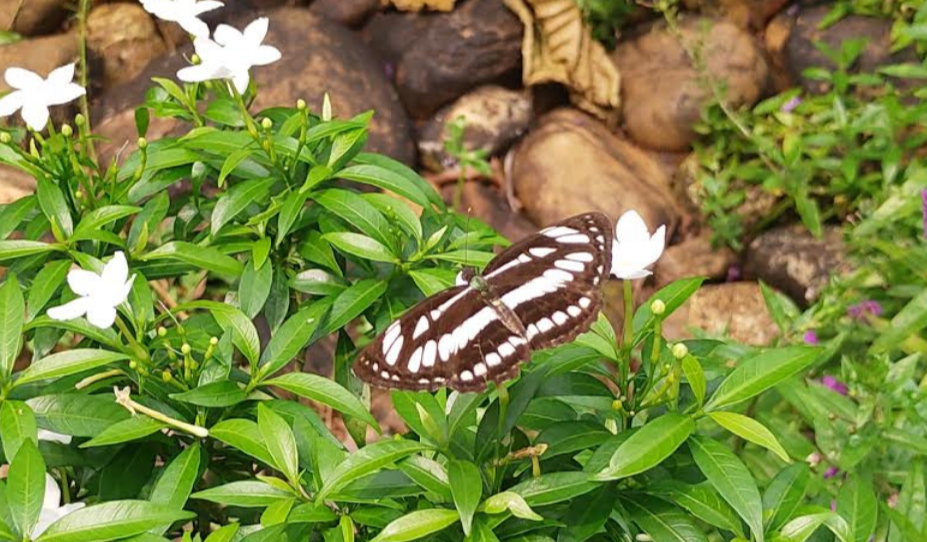
- Common sailor (Neptis hylas) in the park

- Location within Goa Location within India
- Interactive map of Bondla Wildlife Sanctuary
- Location: Goa, India
- Nearest city: Dharbandora
- Coordinates: 15°26′22.8″N 74°06′21.4″E
- Area: 7.98 km^{2} (1,970 acres)
- Elevation: 216 m (709 ft)
- Established: 1969 (57 years ago)
- Governing body: Government of Goa
- Website: https://forest.goa.gov.in/node/1189

Bondla Wildlife Sanctuary is located in northeastern Goa, India in Sattari, Ponda and Sanguem. The total area of the park is 7.98 km^{2}, making it the smallest of the wildlife sanctuaries in Goa. It is a popular destination for both tourists and schoolchildren, as it contains the only zoo in Goa.

Bondla Wildlife Sanctuary provides sanctuary to leopards who have been injured in human-wildlife conflict, as well as "dancing" bears and cobras who, along with their trainers, need a new life after this treatment of endangered wildlife. Bondla Zoo is known for its successful breeding of gaur. The zoo provides an excellent environment to breed and do research on animals.

== Geography ==
Bondla Wildlife Sanctuary is located 38 km from Madgaon and 46 km from Panaji. It is located next to Mhadei Wildlife Sanctuary, and Bhagwan Mahaveer Sanctuary and Mollem National Park.

The forest is a moist deciduous forest, filled with patches of semi-evergreen trees.

The best time to visit the sanctuary is from October to March, when the temperature is moderate.

== Fauna ==
=== Birds ===
Bondla Wildlife Sanctuary is home to over 275 species of birds, such as-

- Greater racket-tailed drongo
- Malabar trogon
- Grey-fronted green pigeon
- Flame-throated bulbul
- Crimson-backed sunbird
- Red-whiskered bulbul
- Black-hooded oriole
- Malabar grey hornbill
- Grey-headed bulbul
- Vernal hanging-parrot
- White-rumped shama
- Sri Lanka frogmouth

=== Mammals ===
The sanctuary is home to giant squirrels, jungle palm squirrels and malabar grey langurs. The zoo contains leopards, bears, gaurs and jungle cats as well as foxes and civets. It also has chitals and wild leopards roaming the forest.

=== Reptiles ===
Many species of reptiles such as the Roux's forest lizard and the Western Ghats flying lizard can be sighted inside the park. Several snake species can be sighted as well.

=== Amphibians ===
Bondla Wildlife Sanctuary is home to the Amboli bush frog, a critically endangered species. Other species include the Malabar gliding frog and the Asian common toad. A species of caecilian, Gegeneophis nadkarnii, was discovered in the sanctuary (see Discoveries).

=== Insects ===
A recent assessment of the butterfly species in the park sighted 91 species of butterflies, with forty species of nymphalids, 20 species of lycaenids, 13 species of papilionids, 12 pierids, 6 hesperids and one riodinid.

The list of butterflies are given here-

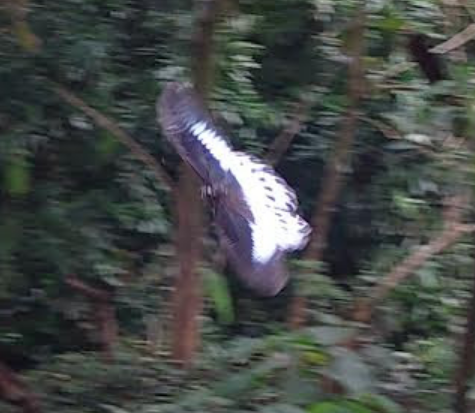
Indian blue mormon in the sanctuary

==== Papilionidae ====
- Spot swordtail
- Common bluebottle
- Narrow-banded bluebottle
- Tailed jay
- Common jay
- Common rose
- Crimson rose
- Southern birdwing
- Common mime
- Lime
- Indian blue mormon
- Common mormon
- Large-spotted helen
- Malabar banded-peacock

==== Pieridae ====
- Psyche
- Pioneer
- Chocolate albatross
- Common wanderer
- Dark wanderer
- Pale wanderer
- Common gull
- Common jezebel
- Common emigrant
- Mottled emigrant
- Small grass yellow
- Common grass yellow

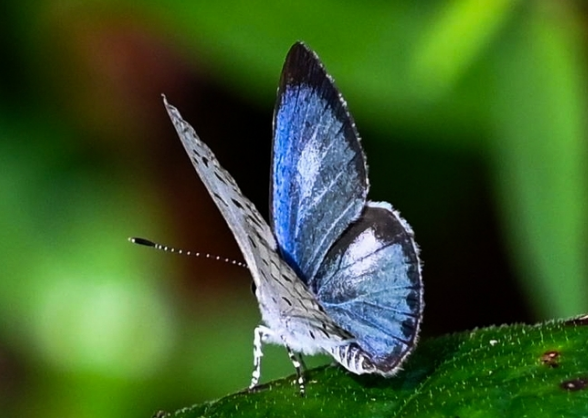
Common hedge blue in the sanctuary

==== Lycaenidae ====
- Angled sunbeam
- Large oakblue
- Yamfly
- Common acacia blue
- Monkey puzzle
- Common imperial
- Common silverline
- Club silverline
- Fluffy tit
- Gram blue
- Angled pierrot
- Common cerulean
- Dark cerulean
- Pea blue
- Dark pierrot
- Common pierrot
- Red pierrot
- Plains cupid
- Quaker
- Lesser grass blue
- Common hedge blue
- Common line blue
- Plain hedge-blue

==== Riodinidae ====
- Plum judy
- Double-banded judy

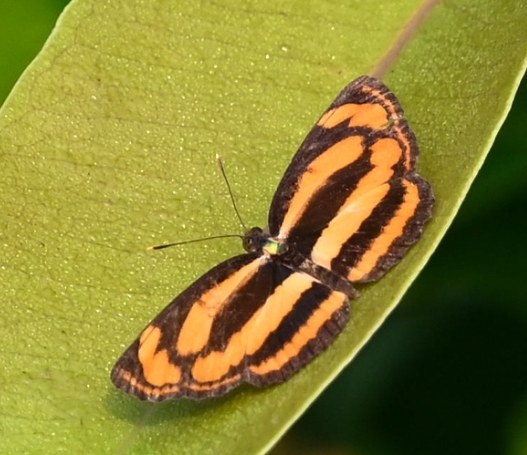
Common lascar in the sanctuary

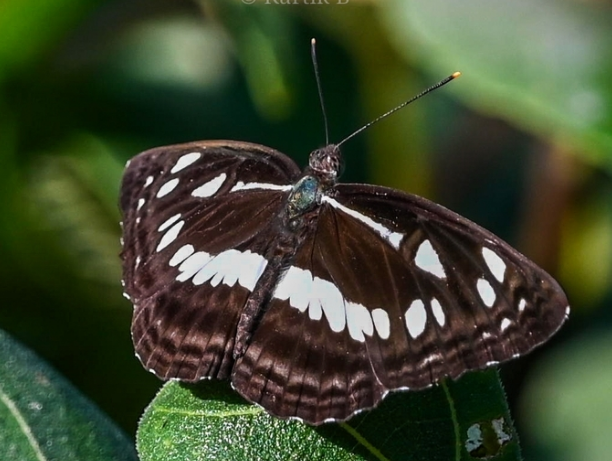
Chestnut-streaked sailer in the sanctuary

==== Nymphalidae ====
- Common evening-brown
- Common palmfly
- Bamboo tree-brown
- Dark tree-brown
- Tamil bushbrown
- Dark-branded bushbrown
- Common four-ring
- Common five-ring
- Common tree-brown
- Common nawab
- Common castor
- Angled castor
- Rustic
- Common leopard
- Tamil yeoman
- Yellow pansy
- Blue pansy
- Lemon pansy
- Peacock pansy
- Chocolate pansy
- Grey pansy
- Painted Lady
- Great eggfly
- Danaid eggfly
- Blue oakleaf
- Common sailer
- Chestnut-streaked sailer
- Color sergeant
- Commander
- Grey count
- Common baron
- Clipper
- Cruiser
- Tamil lacewing
- Tawny coster
- Glassy tiger
- Blue tiger
- Common tiger
- Plain tiger
- Common crow
- Malabar tree nymph
- Common lascar
- King crow

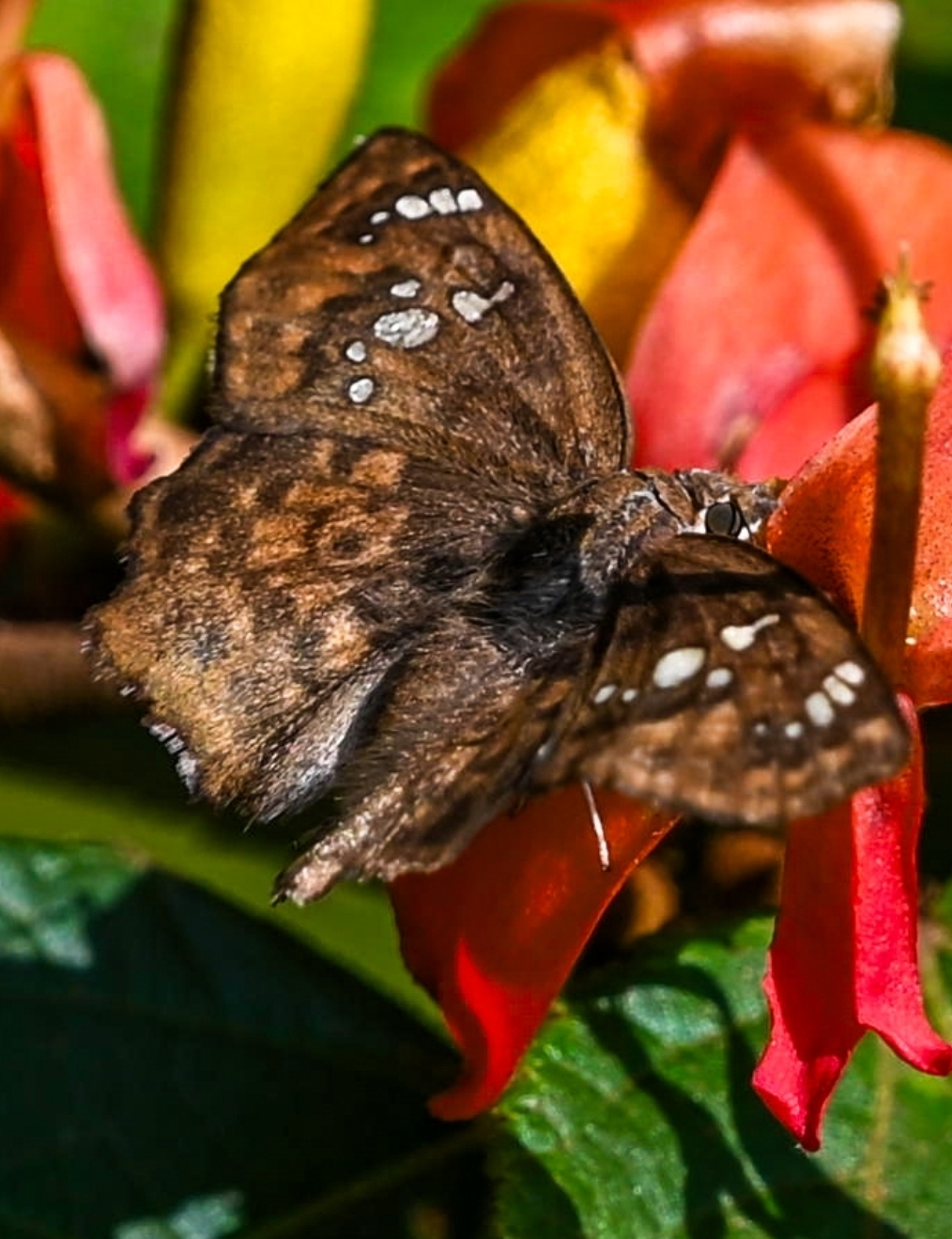
Golden angle in the sanctuary

==== Hesperiidae ====
- Grass demon
- Indian skipper
- Dark palm dart
- Common dart
- Formosan swift
- Tricolored pied flat
- Fulvous pied flat
- Chestnut bob
- Pygmy scrub-hopper
- Suffused snow-flat
- Common spotted-flat
- Golden angle

== Flora ==
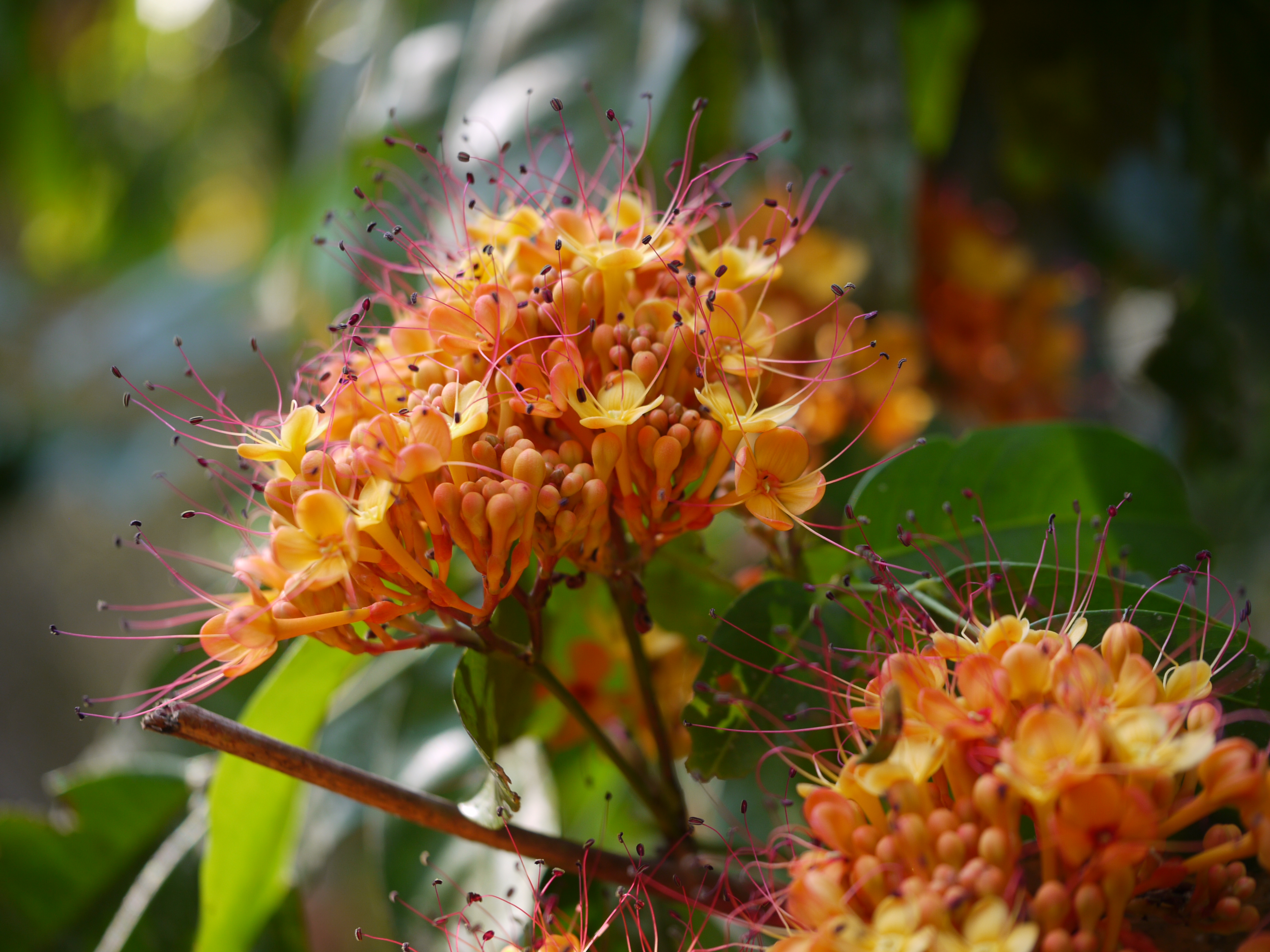
Asoka in the sanctuary

Bondla Wildlife Sanctuary is home to Matti, the state tree of Goa, and the Indian rosewood. Other common trees are the-

- Crape-mrytle
- Jamba
- Mimusops elengi
- Asoka
- Entada
- Bambusa bambos

Other exotic plants are also found in the gardens inside the park.

== Zoo ==
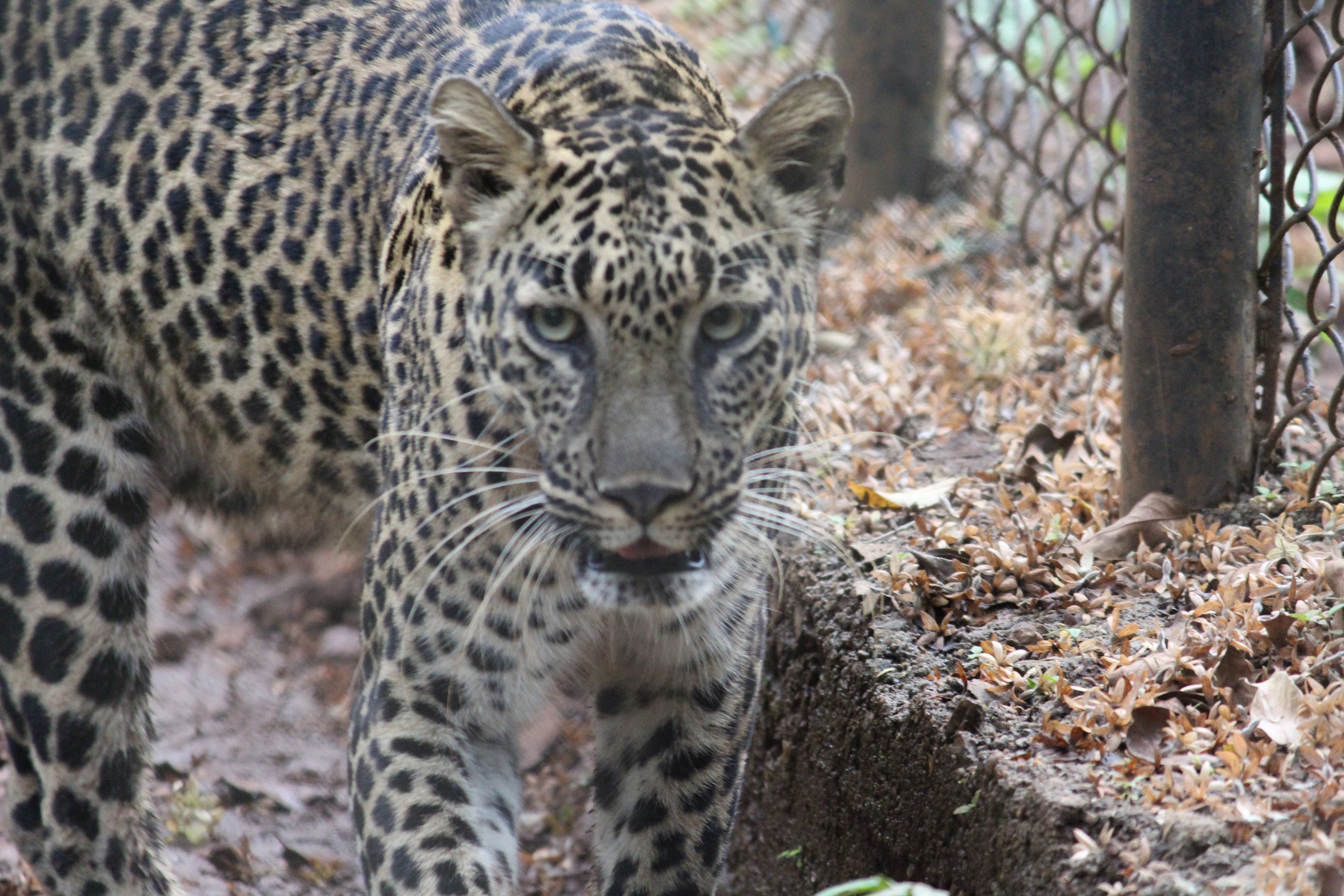
Leopard

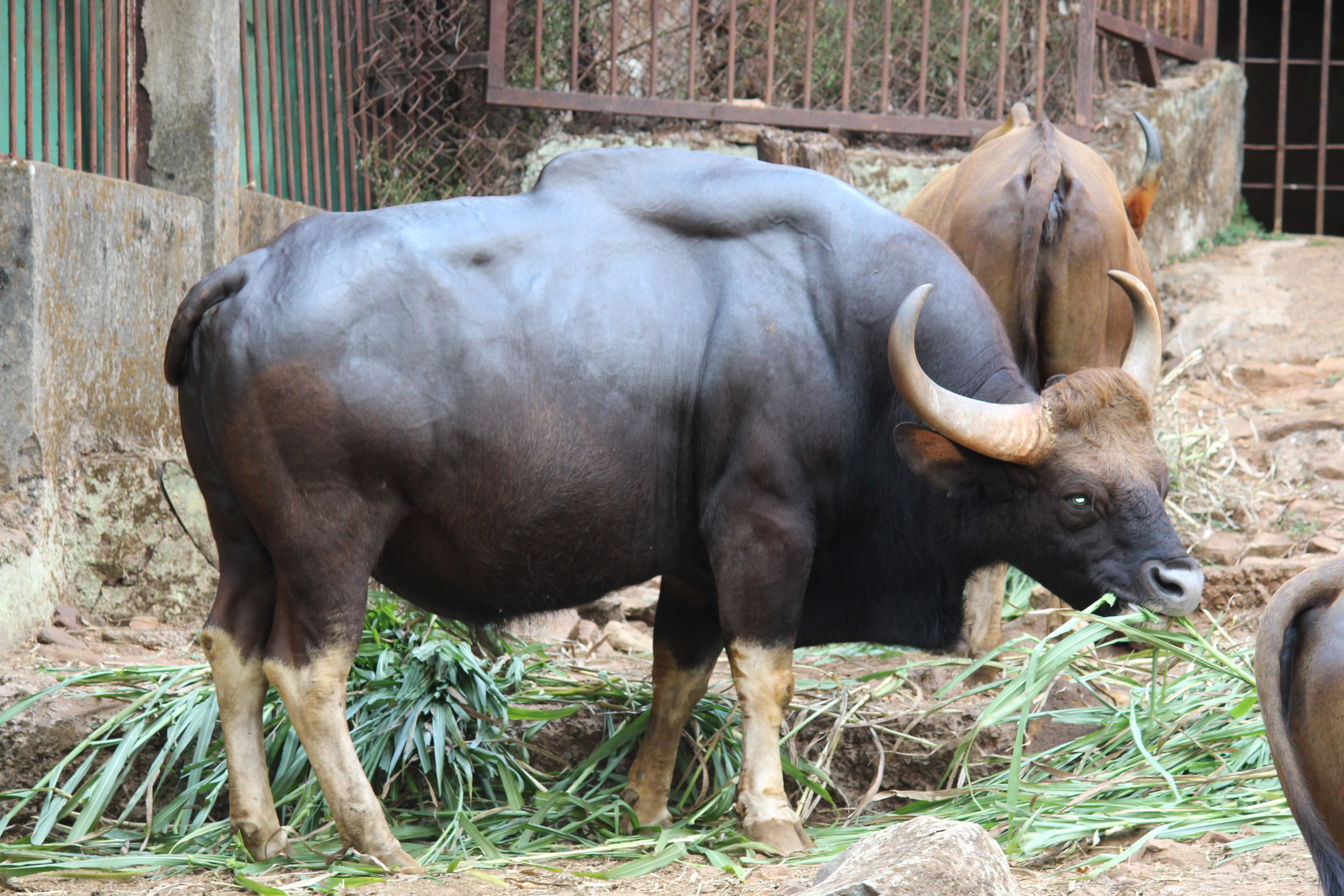
Gaur

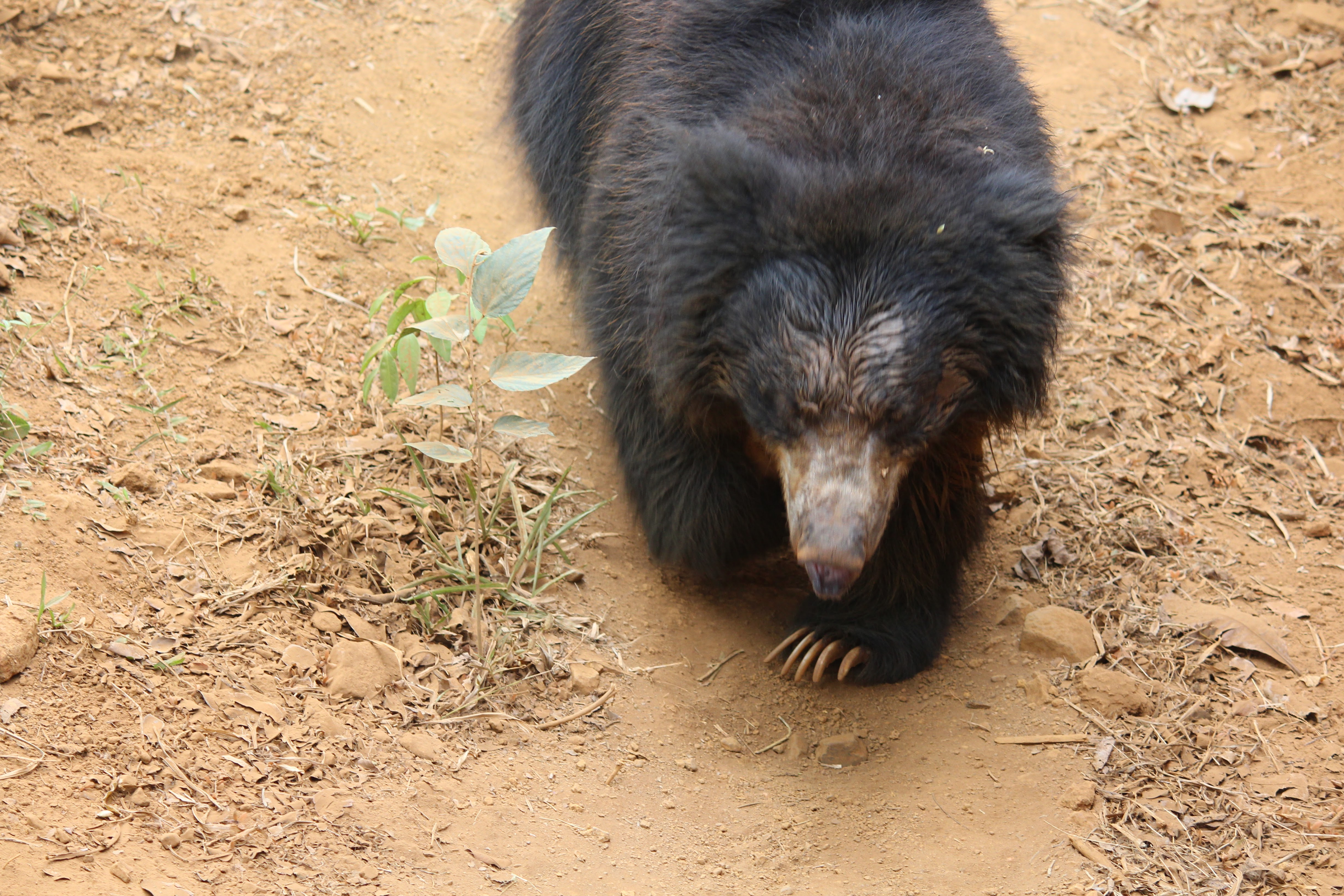
Sloth bear

Bondla Wildlife Sanctuary contains a zoo inside it, commonly called the Bondla zoo. It lies in the middle of the sanctuary. These are some of the animals that have been kept inside the zoo.

- Leopard
- Jackal
- Jungle cat
- Palm civet
- King cobra
- Rock python
- Mugger crocodile
- Spectacled caiman
- Wild boar
- Silver pheasant
- Cockatiel
- Sloth bear
- Blue-and-yellow macaw
- Indian peafowl
- Rose-ringed parakeet
- Alexandrine parakeet
- Plum-headed parakeet
- Geese
- Emu
- Porcupine
- Spotted deer
- Barking deer
- Four-horned antelope
- Sambar
- Blackbuck
- Indian elephant
- Common cobra
- Checkered keelback
- Russell's viper
- Indian flapshell turtle
- Ring-necked pheasant
- Lady Amherst's pheasant
- Hippopotamus
- Bronzeback tree snake
- Forsten's cat snake
- Indian black turtle

== Rehabilitation programs ==
Animals which have come into close proximity with human settlements are kept in the rehabilitation centers in the park.

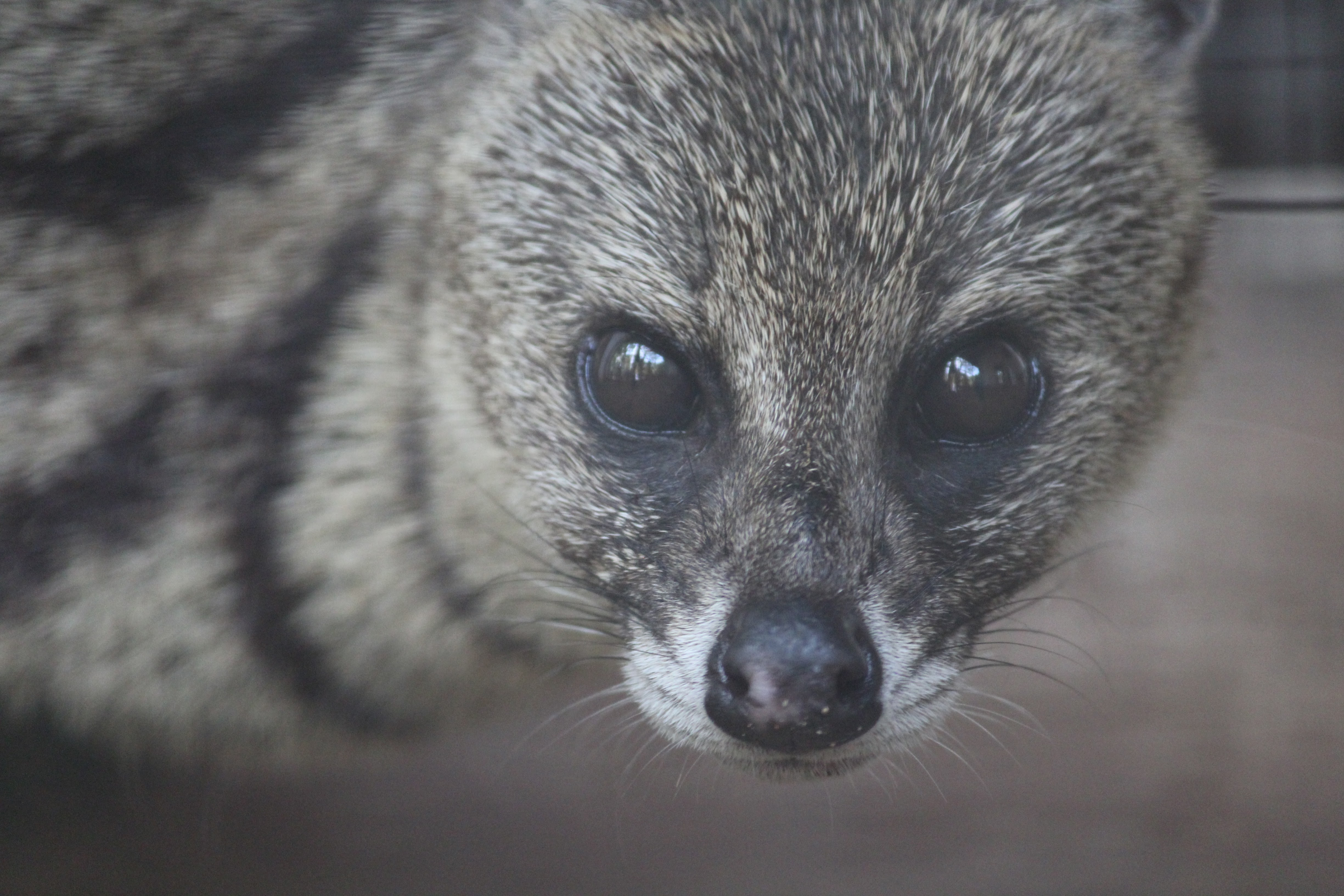
Palm civet

Some of the animals which have been successfully rehabilitated are listed below-

- Crocodile
- Indian rock python
- Sand boa
- Trinket snake
- Palm civet
- Jackal
- Indian rat snake
- Sambar
- Barn owl
- Brahminy kite
- Black-footed langur
- Cat snake
- Spectacled cobra

== Discoveries ==
In 2004, Gopalakrishna Bhatta and P. Prasanth described Gegeneophis nadkarnii, a species of caecilian, based on two specimens collected from Bondla Wildlife Sanctuary. This species was later merged with Gegeneophis danieli, which had been discovered a year earlier in Maharashtra.

== Park-specific information ==
The sanctuary contains a botanical garden, which contain exotic and rare types of plants. Nature trails are also found inside the park and trekking and hiking trails are present. These treks are conducted in the presence of a local guide.

A Nature Education Center along with a library is present in the park. Movies and documentaries can be screened on request.

The park was shut down for a few days in 2025 following a viral infection that killed three civets and two cats.

== Gallery ==
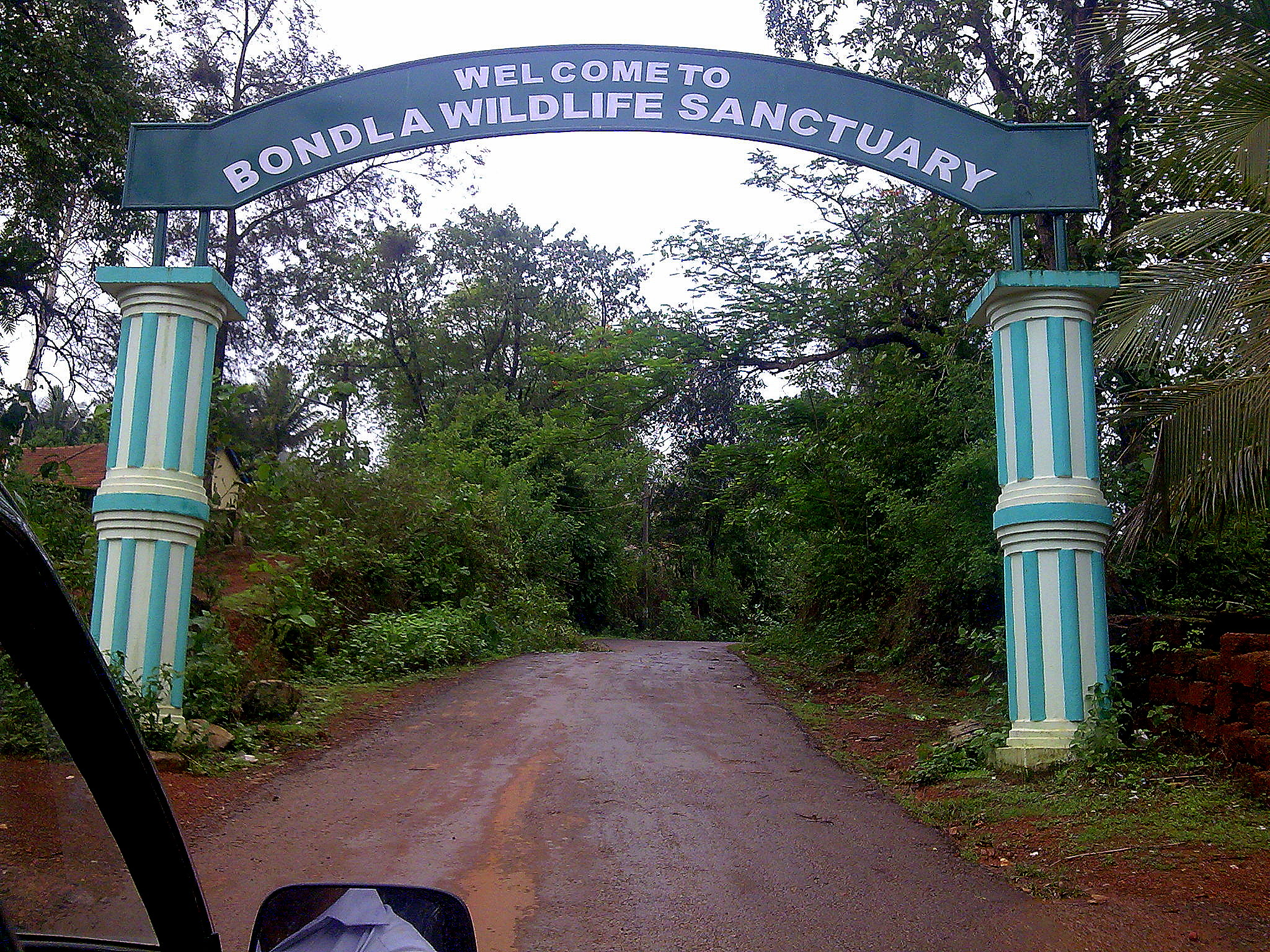
Entrance to the Sanctuary

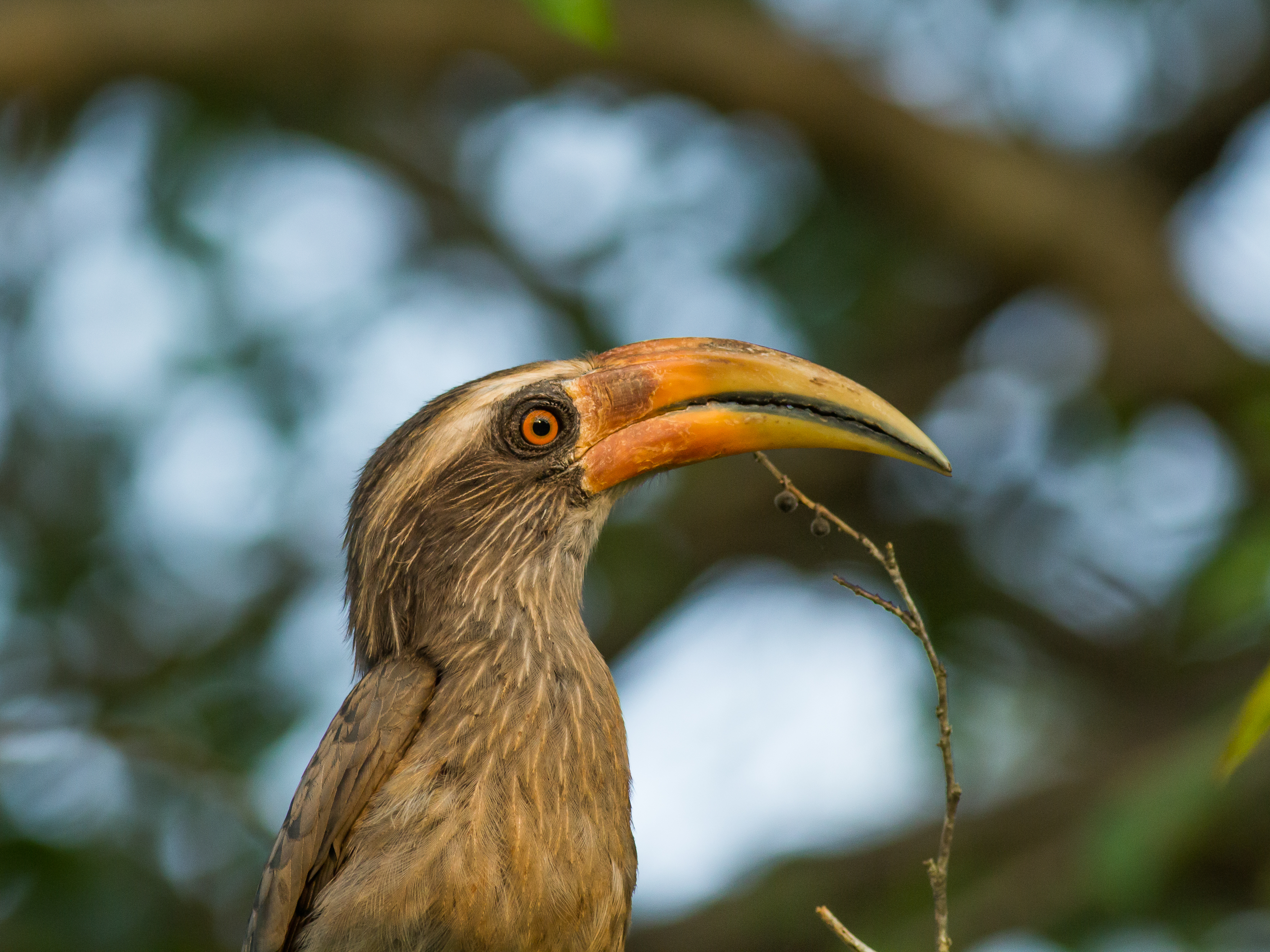
Malabar grey hornbill in the sanctuary

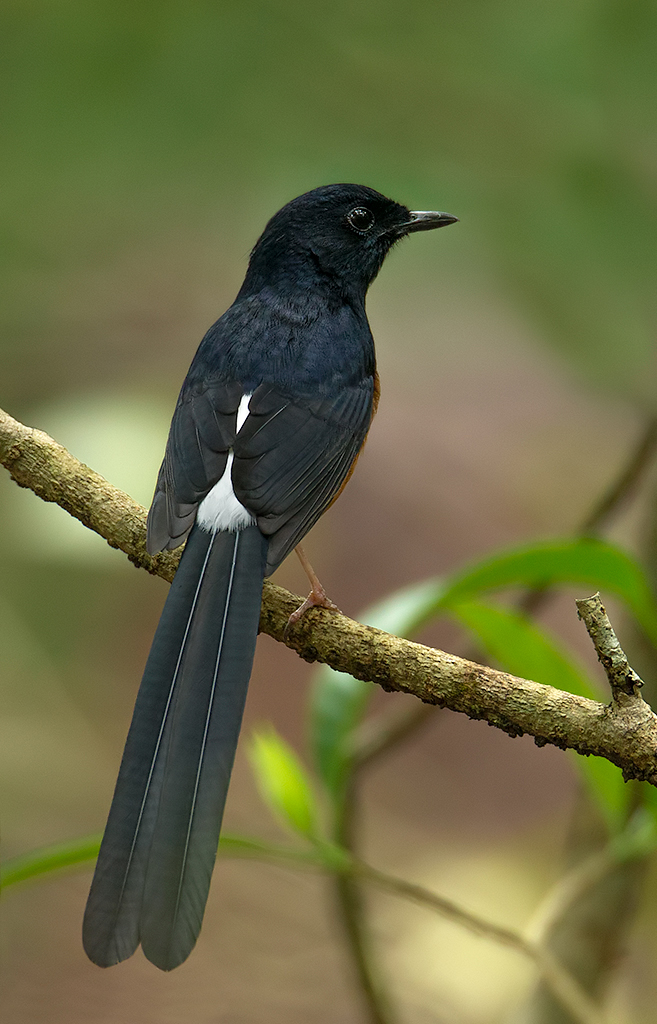
White-rumped shama in the sanctuary

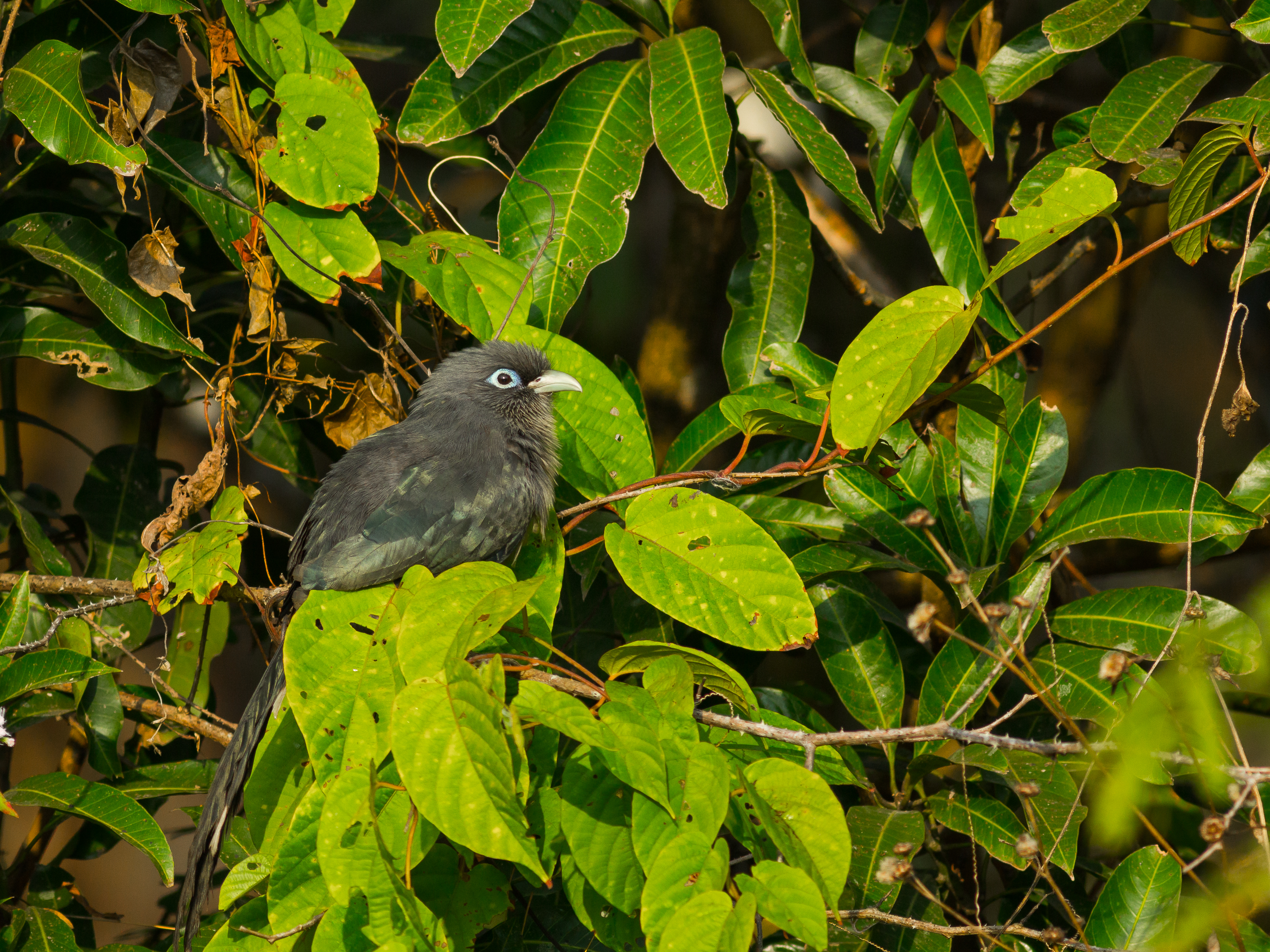
Blue-faced malkoha in the sanctuary

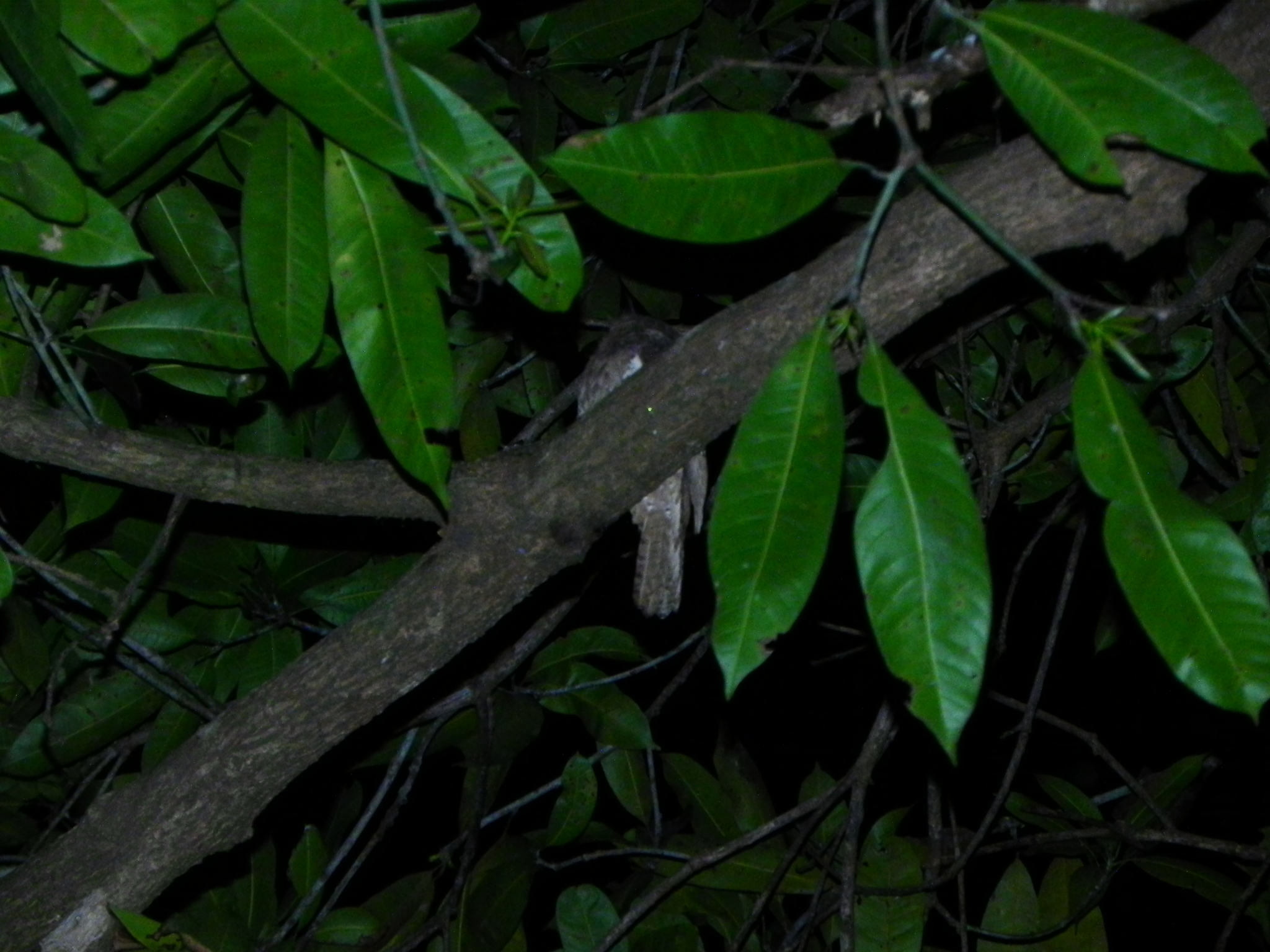
Sri Lanka frogmouth

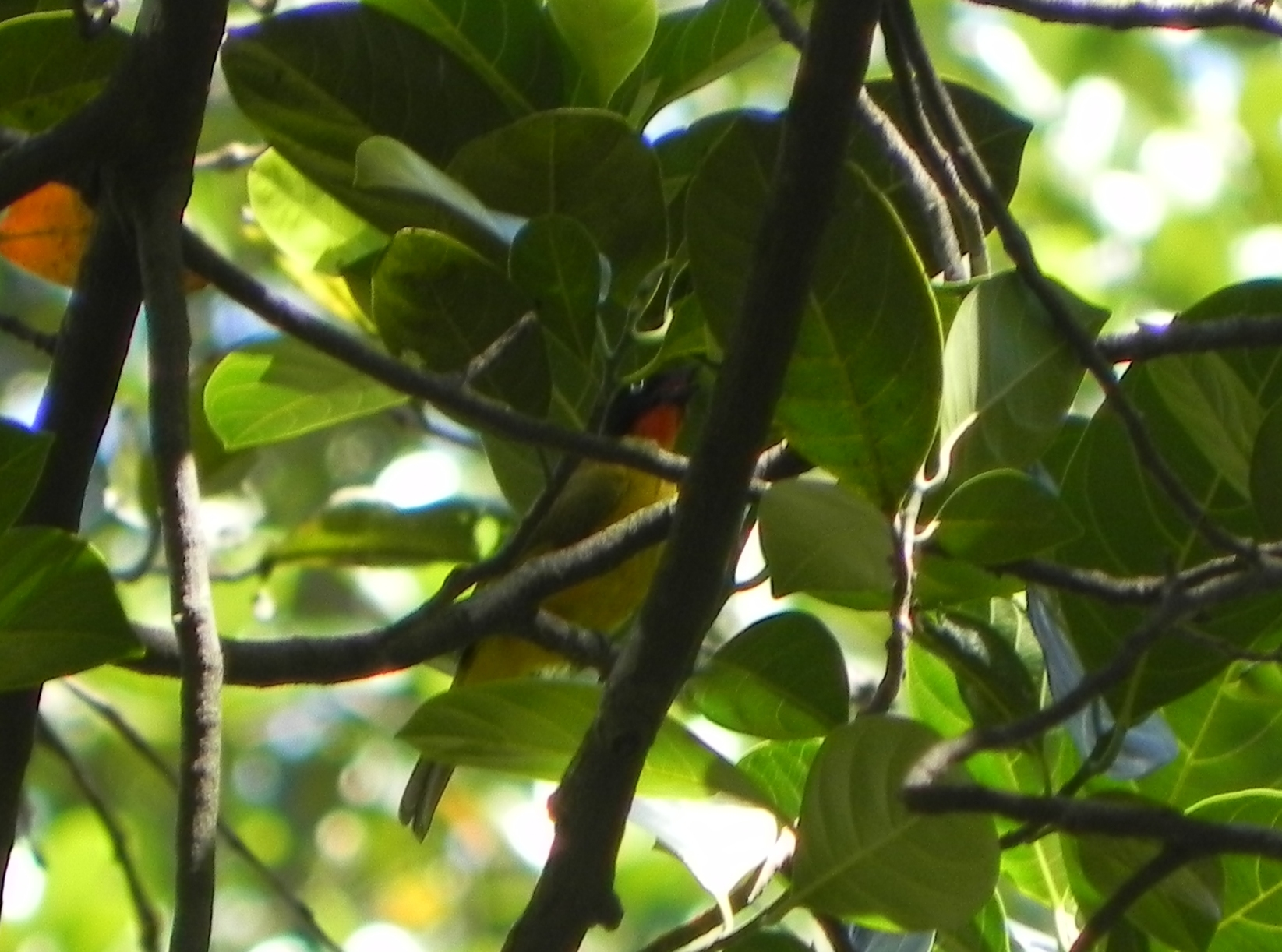
Flame-throated bulbul

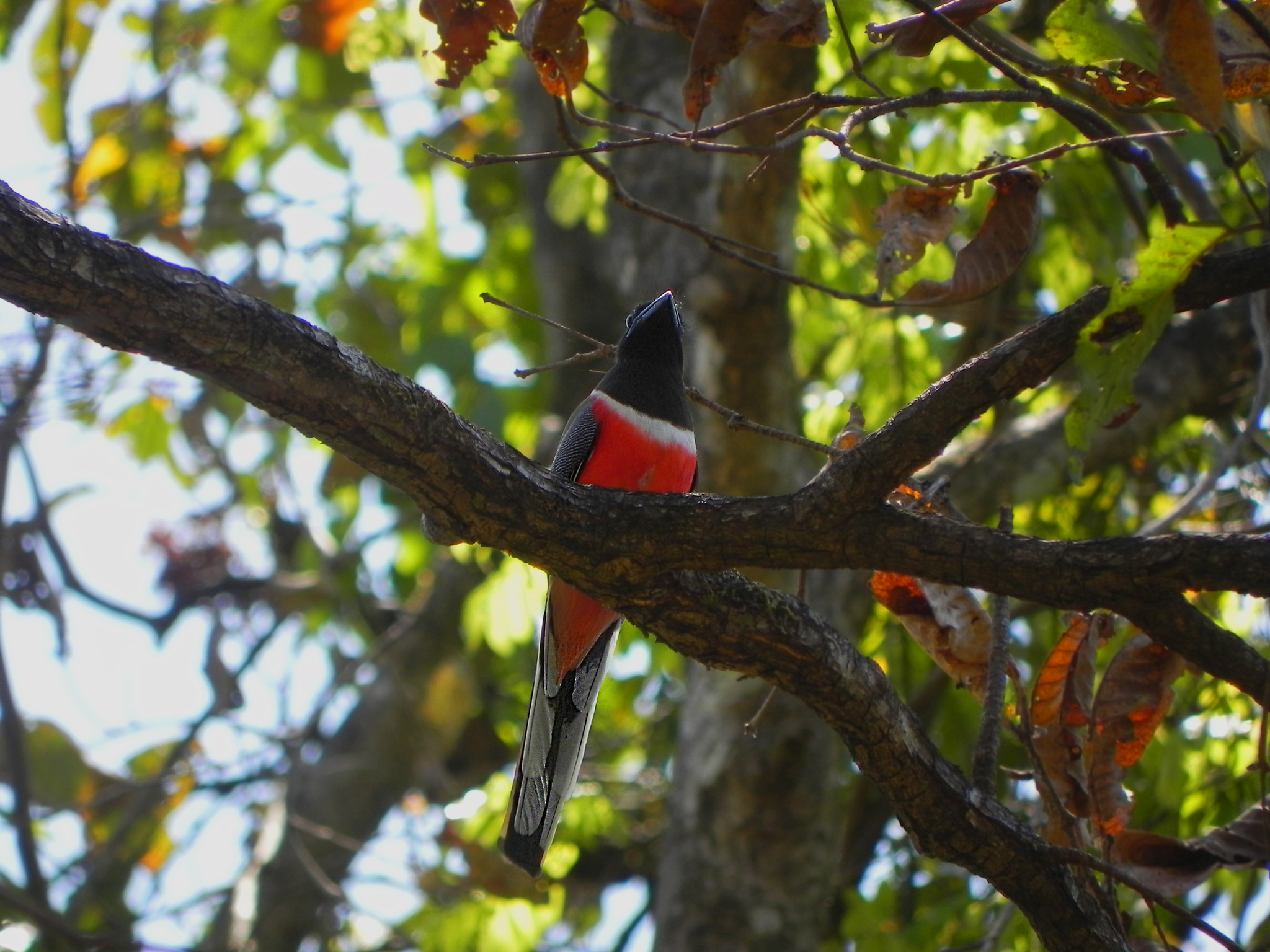
Malabar trogon male

== See also ==
- Bondla Wildlife Sanctuary travel guide from Wikivoyage
- Bhagwan Mahaveer Sanctuary and Mollem National Park
- Cotigao Wildlife Sanctuary
- Mhadei Wildlife Sanctuary
- Netravali Wildlife Sanctuary
- Salim Ali Bird Sanctuary
