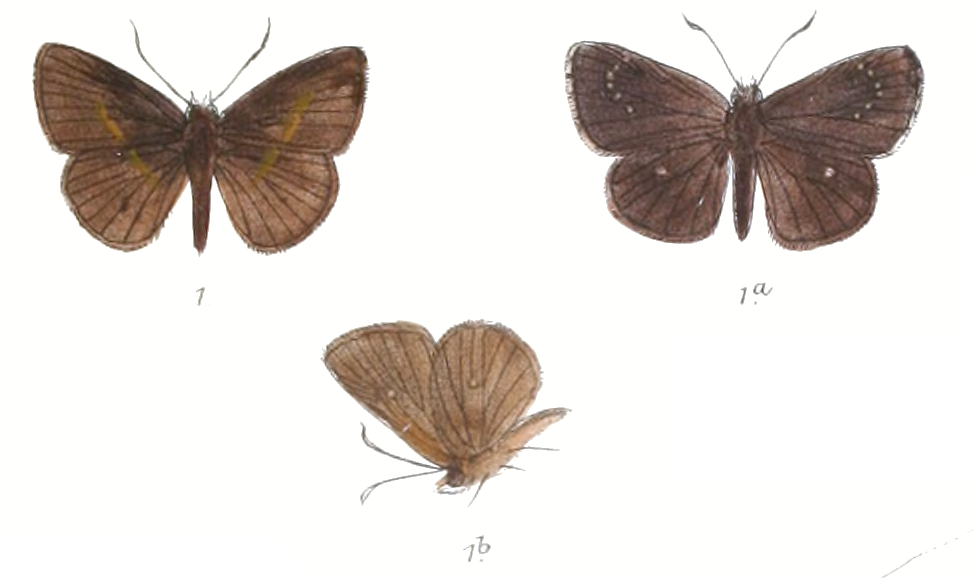

Scientific classification
- Kingdom: Animalia
- Phylum: Arthropoda
- Class: Insecta
- Order: Lepidoptera
- Family: Hesperiidae
- Genus: Iambrix
- Species: I. stellifer

Binomial name
- Iambrix stellifer (Butler, 1879)

Synonyms
- Astictopterus stellifer Butler, 1879; Jambrix stellifer niasicus Fruhstorfer, 1910

= Iambrix stellifer =

Species of butterfly

Iambrix stellifer, the starry bob or Malay chestnut bob, is a butterfly of the family Hesperiidae. It is found in southern Burma, Laos, Thailand, Malaysia and Singapore, as well as on Borneo, Sumatra, Nias, Java, Batoe and Mentawi. The habitat consists of forested lowland areas.

The wingspan is about 25 mm.It is very similar to salsala, above blacker owing to its being less coated with golden brown, the dots on the forewing fine though distinct and so arranged that one is situate above the sub median area, one in the cell-end, and a third before the centre of the distal margin. Beneath there are behind the white spots of the hindwing some more small orange spots.

The larvae feed on bamboo species. They are pale green with a yellow head.
