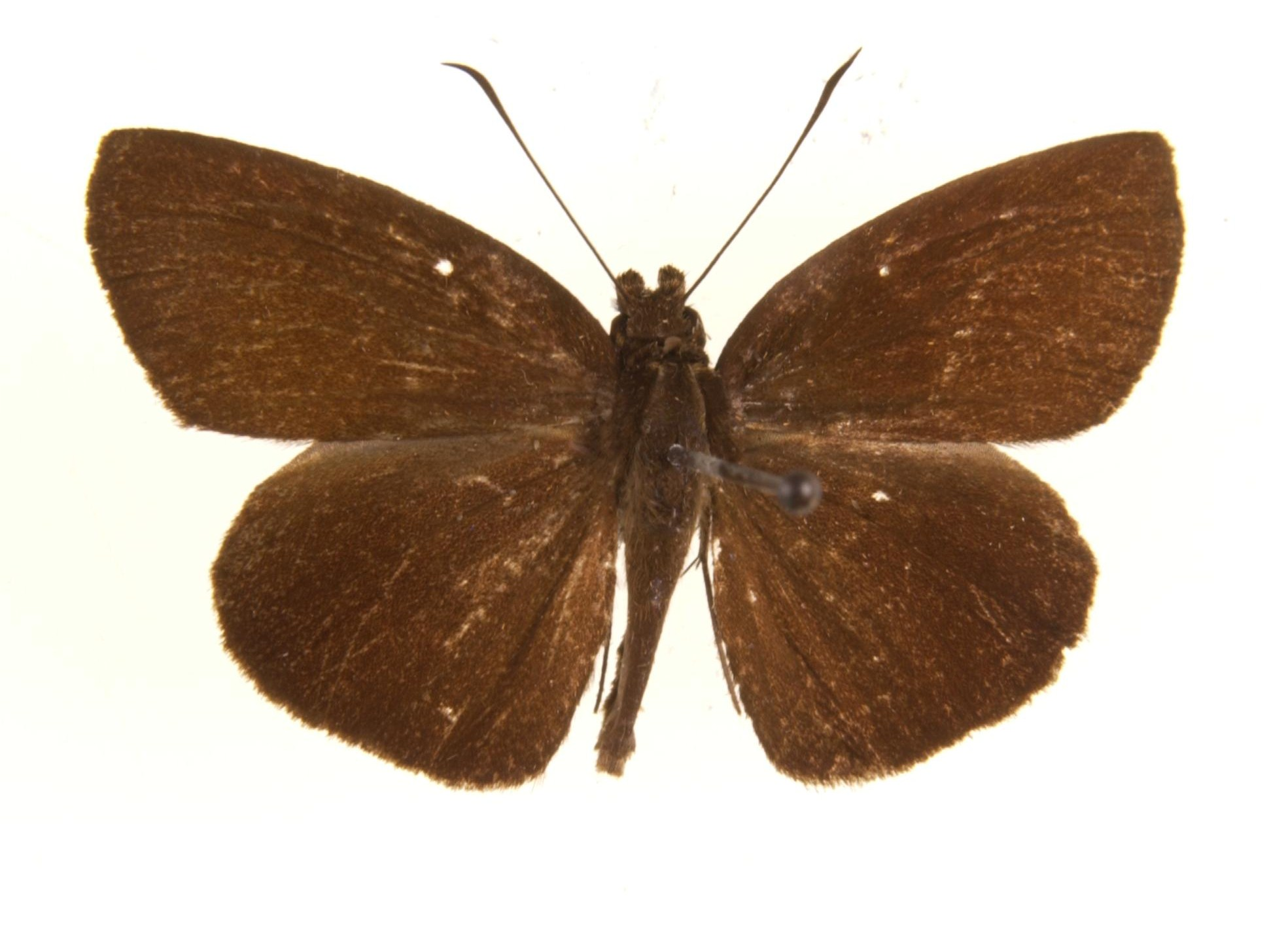
- Iambrix salsala

Scientific classification
- Kingdom: Animalia
- Phylum: Arthropoda
- Class: Insecta
- Order: Lepidoptera
- Family: Hesperiidae
- Tribe: Ancistroidini
- Genus: Iambrix; Watson, 1893

Species
- Iambrix salsala; Iambrix stellifer

= Iambrix =

Genus of butterflies

Iambrix is an Indomalayan genus of grass skippers in the family Hesperiidae.

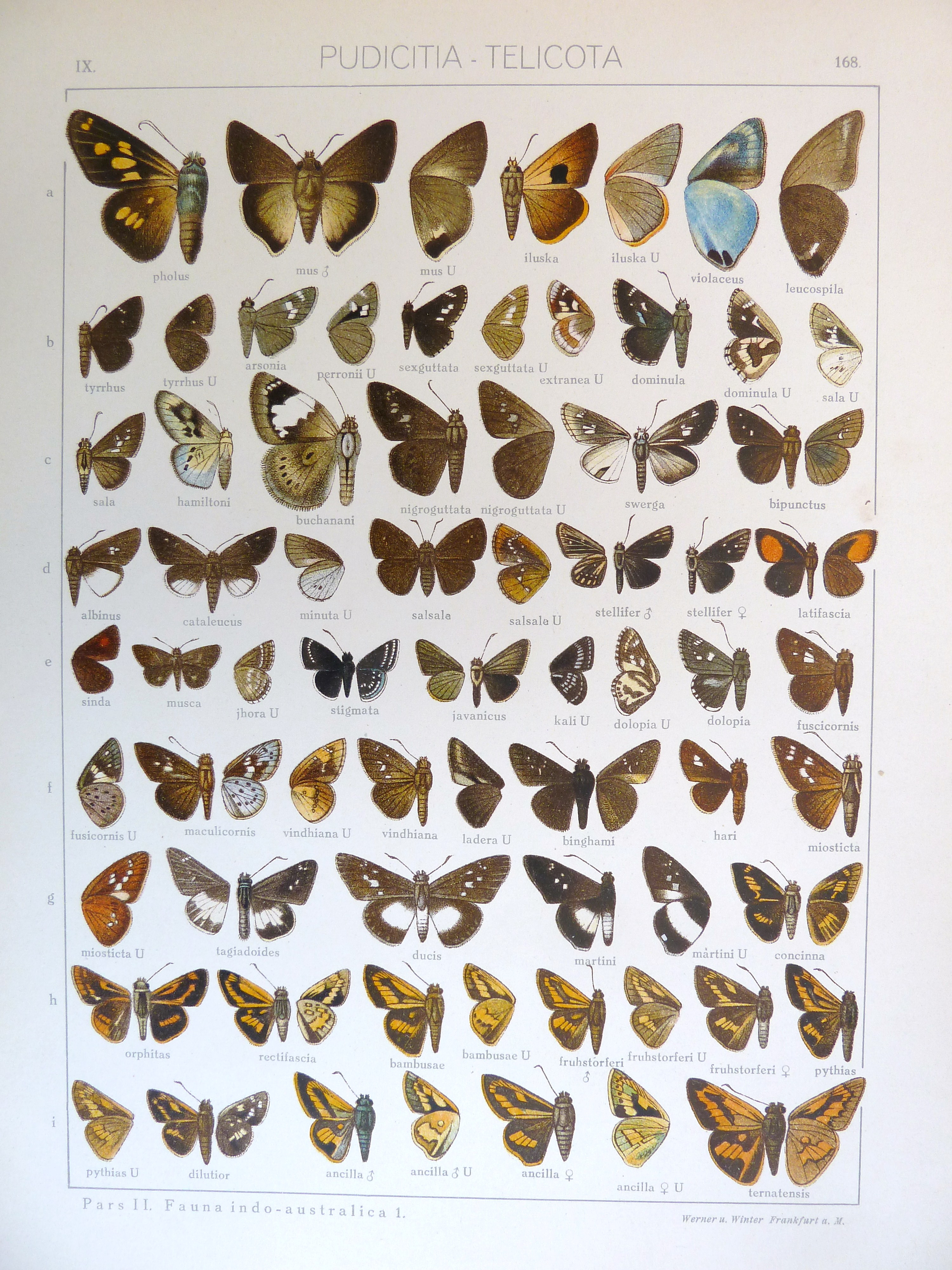
Iambrix salsala Moore, 1865 and Iambrix stellifer Butler, 1877 in Seitz

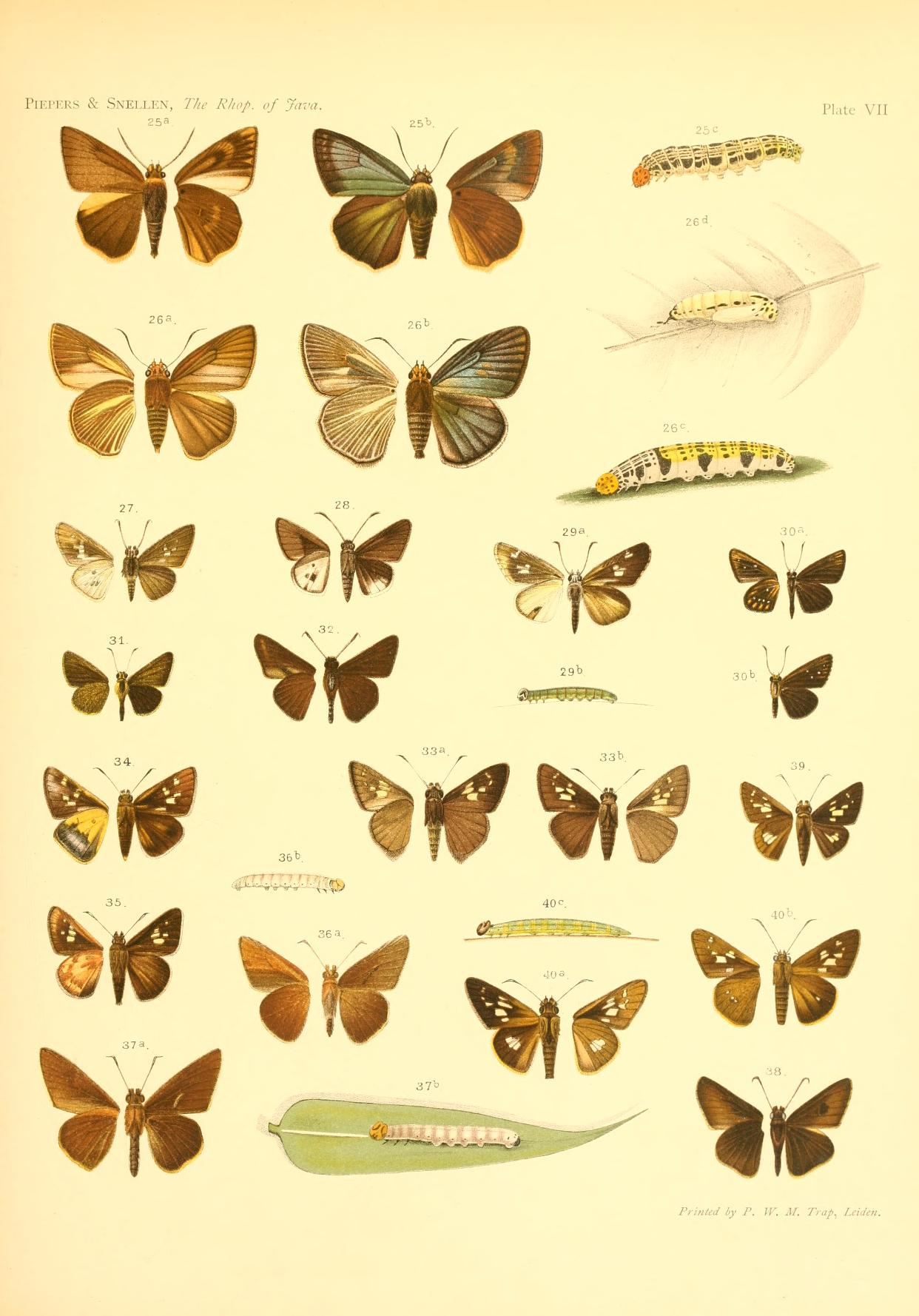
Iambrix stellifer Butler, 1877 in Piepers and Snellen The Rhopalocera of Java
