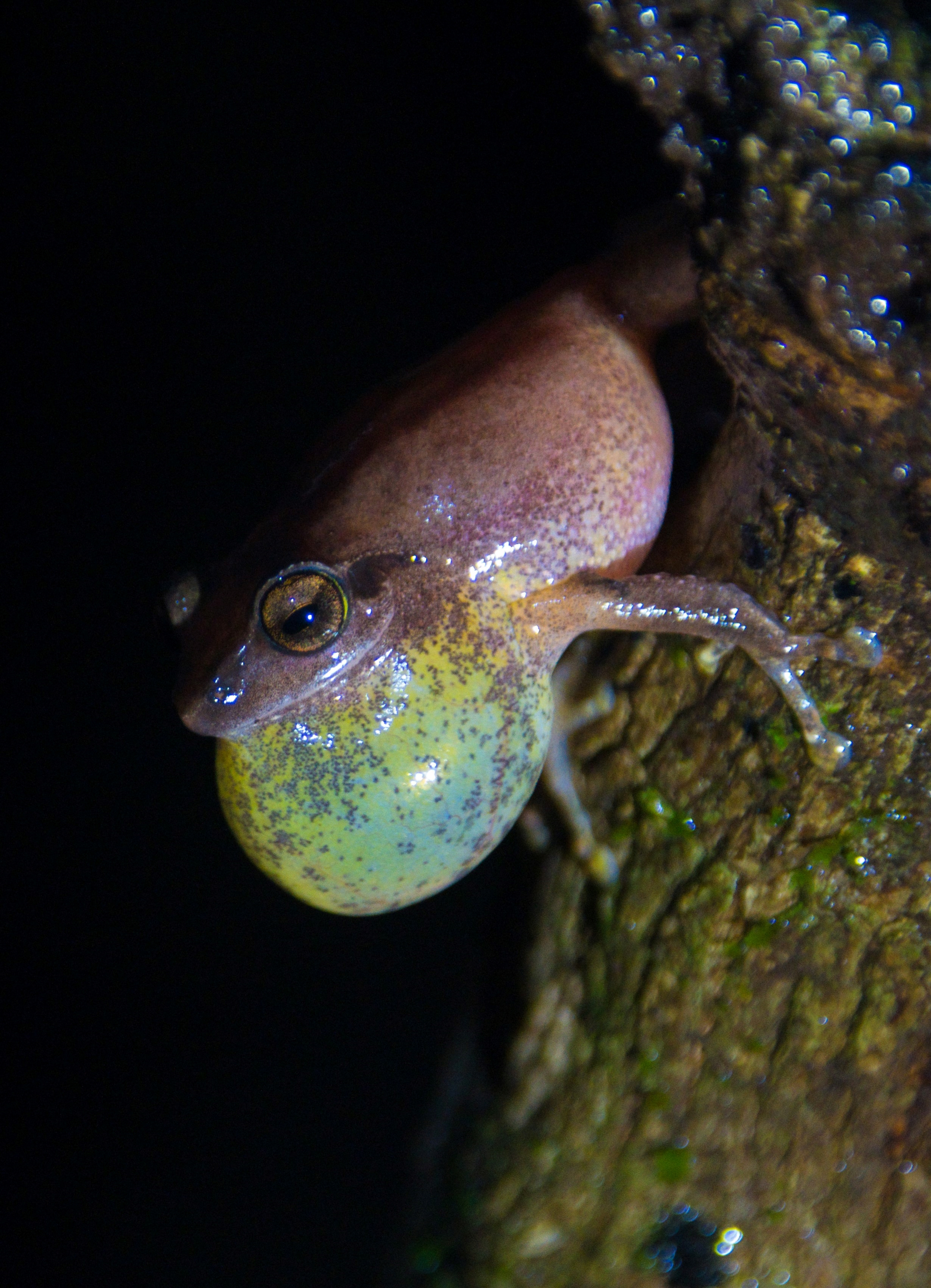
- Individual with inflated vocal sac in Amboli.

Conservation status
- Critically Endangered (IUCN 3.1)

Scientific classification
- Kingdom: Animalia
- Phylum: Chordata
- Class: Amphibia
- Order: Anura
- Family: Rhacophoridae
- Genus: Pseudophilautus
- Species: P. amboli

Binomial name
- Pseudophilautus amboli (Biju and Bossuyt, 2009)

Synonyms
- Philautus amboli Biju and Bossuyt, 2009

= Pseudophilautus amboli =

Amboli bush frog

Species of amphibian

Pseudophilautus amboli, the Amboli bush frog, is a rare shrub frog species endemic to the Western Ghats (India). It is found in Amboli (the type locality) and Amba in Maharashtra and in Castle Rock, Londa, Jog Falls-Mavingundi, and Kudremukh-Malleshwaram in Karnataka.

== Description ==
The Amboli bush frog is a small frog, though it is medium-sized to large among its relatives. The snout–vent length of this species is 34 mm (1.3 in) in males and to 37.5 mm (1.48 in) in females. Males have a large and transparent vocal sack when calling. The body is rather robust. Discs of fingertips are much enlarged. Tympanum is dark brown. dorsum is uniform blackish brown. Throat lemon yellowish with minute black spots.

== Habitat ==
In Amboli it was found in extremely disturbed areas close to evergreen forest patches, although it is not known whether or not it occurs in primary evergreen forest. It breeds by direct development.

== Threats and conservation action ==
The major threat to the species is habitat loss and fragmentation due to urbanization and tourism development. It is not known to occur in any protected areas, making habitat protection an urgent priority.

== Gallery ==
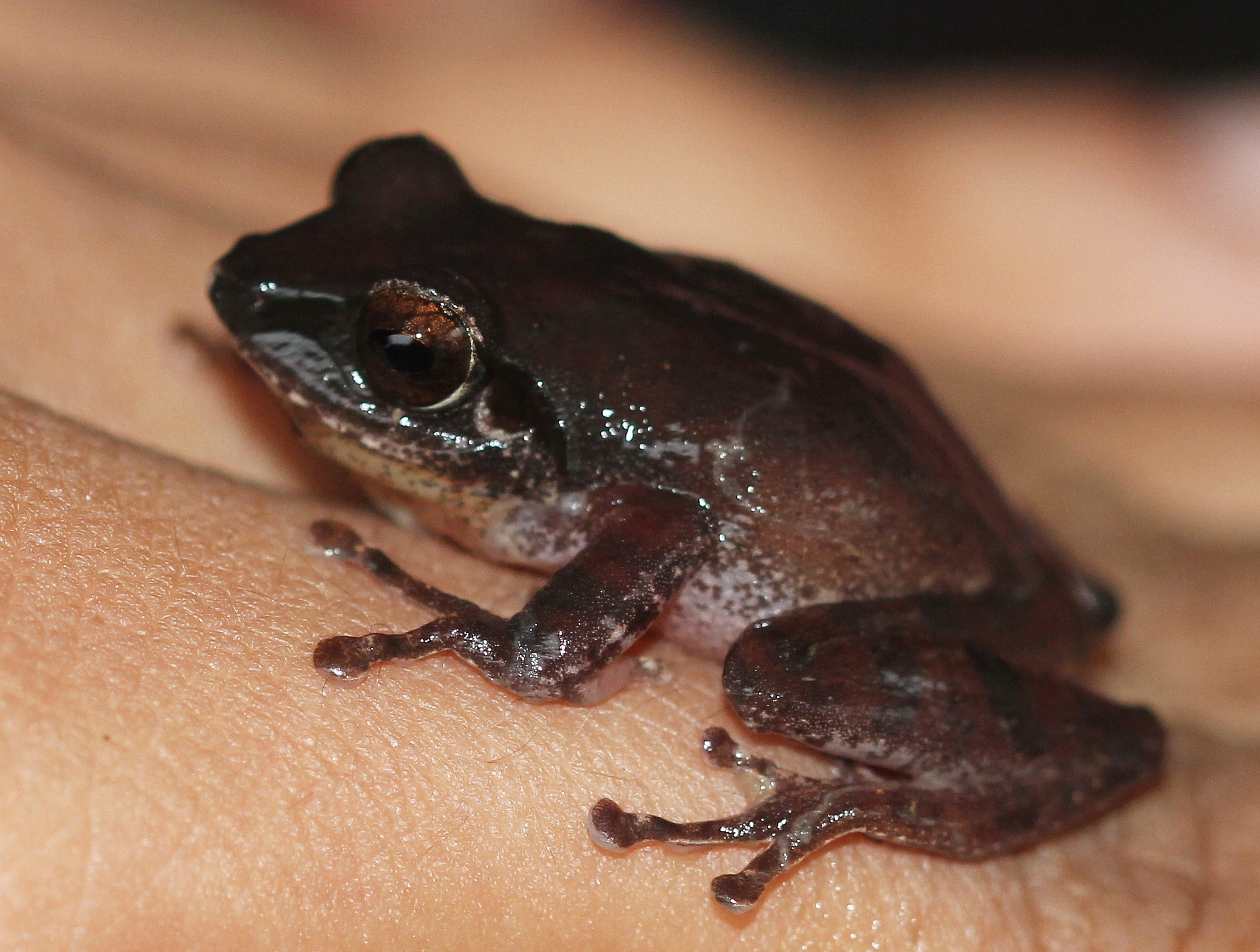
Typical Amboli bush frog

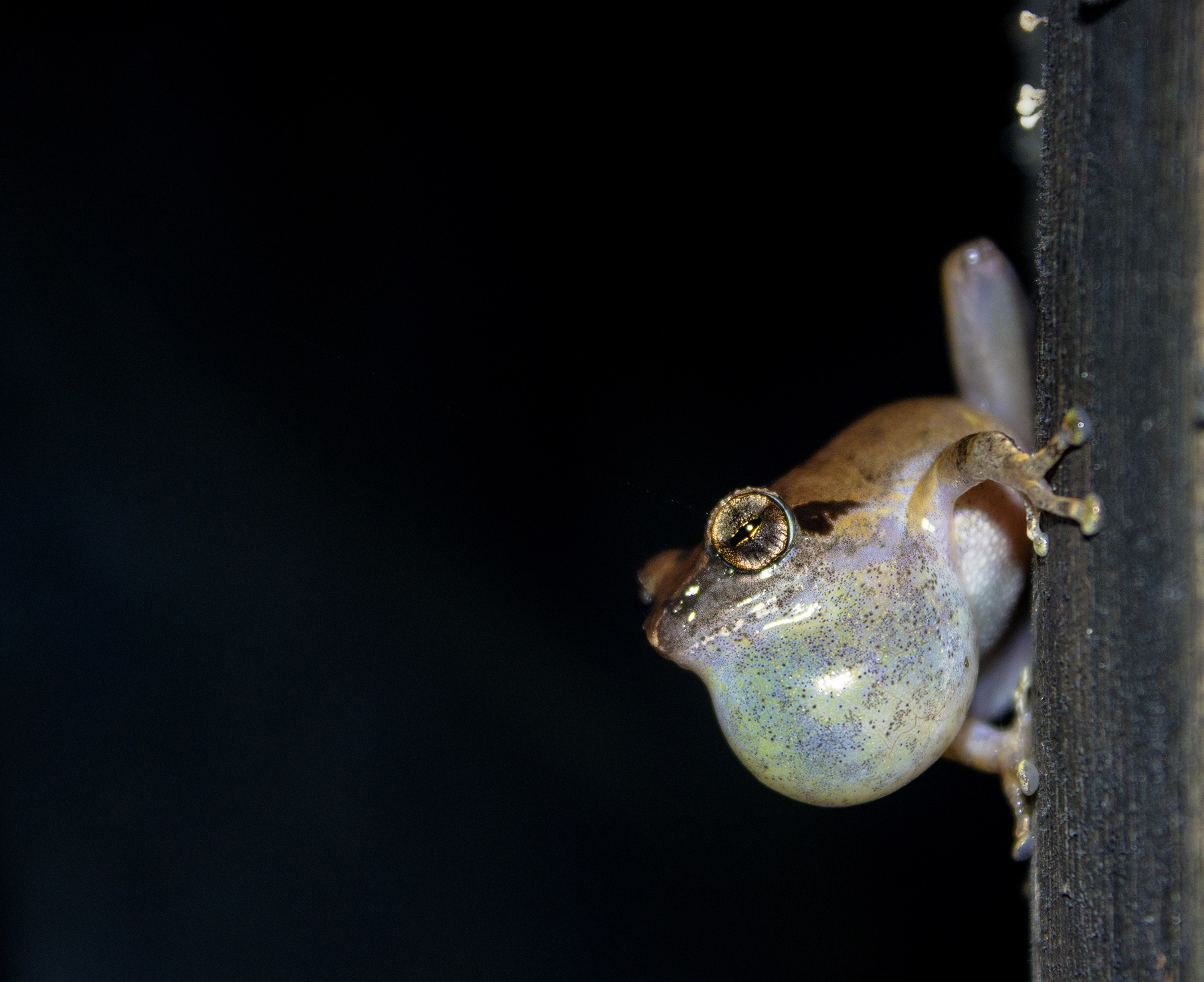
Amboli bush frog with enlarged vocal sac for mating calls

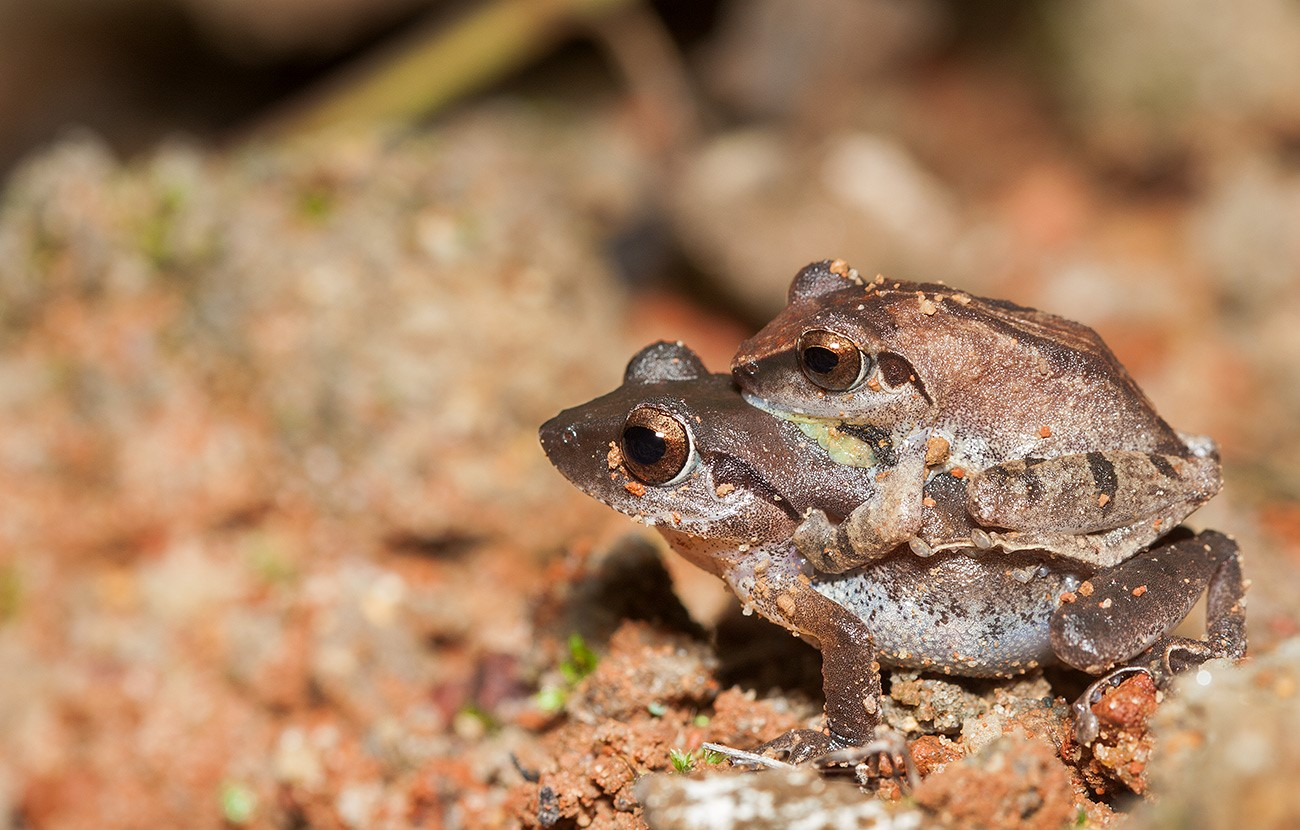
Amplexus
