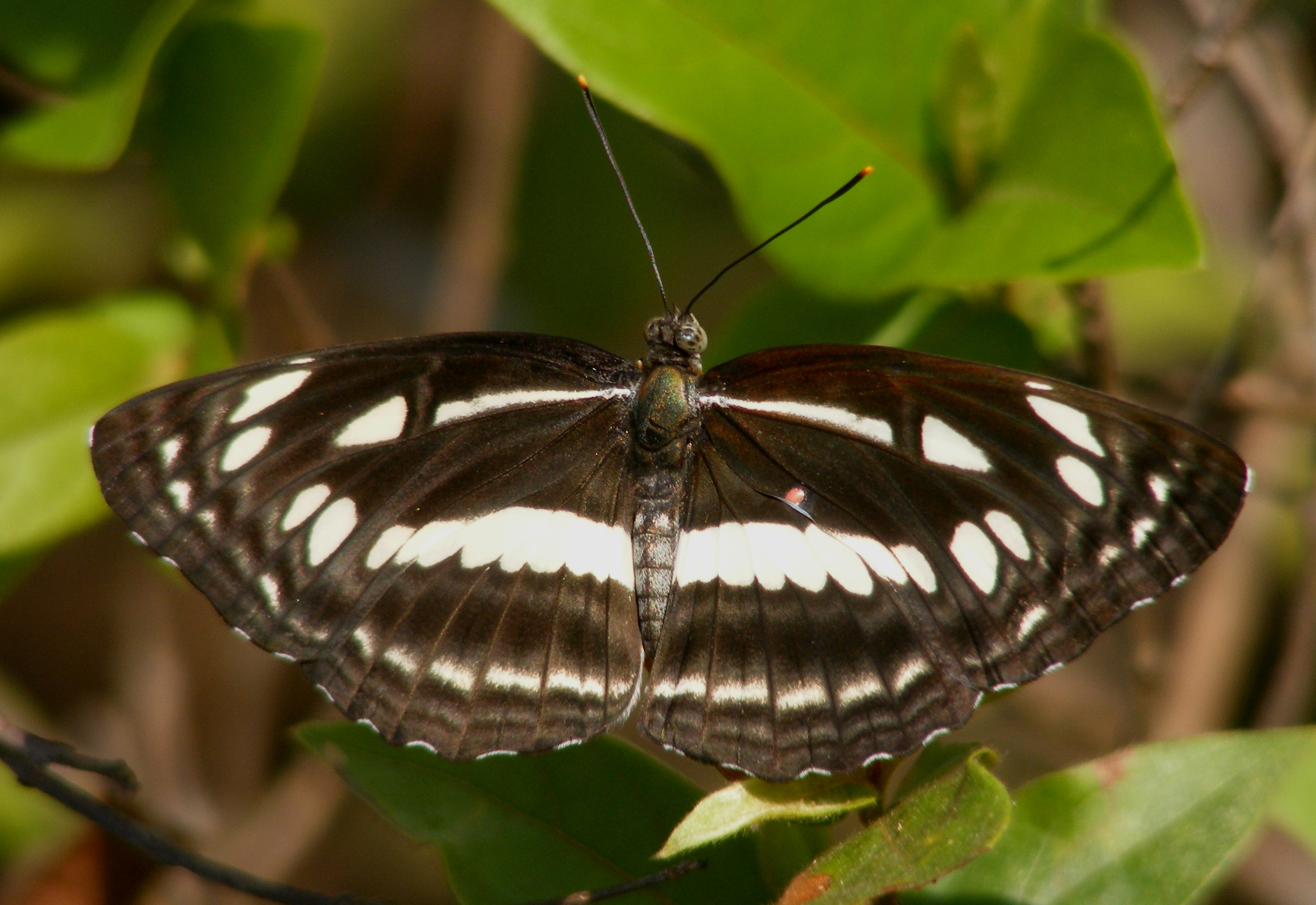

Scientific classification
- Domain: Eukaryota
- Kingdom: Animalia
- Phylum: Arthropoda
- Class: Insecta
- Order: Lepidoptera
- Family: Nymphalidae
- Genus: Neptis
- Species: N. jumbah

Binomial name
- Neptis jumbah Moore, 1857

= Neptis jumbah =

Chestnut-streaked sailer

Species of butterfly

Neptis jumbah, the chestnut-streaked sailer, is a species of nymphalid butterfly found in South Asia.

== Description ==
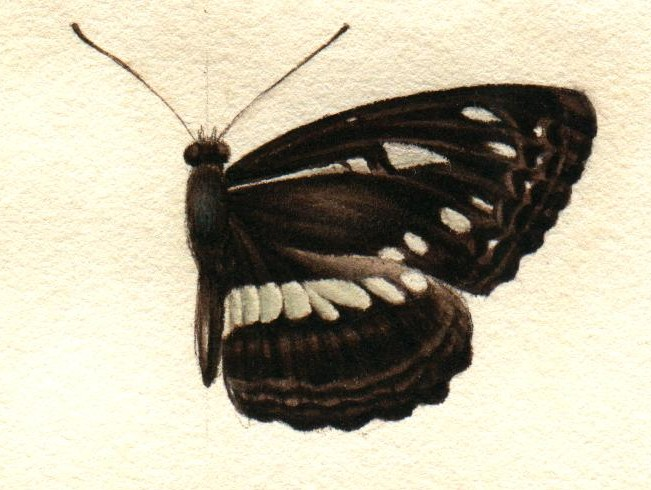
Sketch by Robert Templeton

The male somewhat resembles Neptis columella, but differs as follows: Upperside fuliginous black, the interspaces between the veins deeper black, very conspicuous in certain lights, particularly so between the subbasal and postdiscal markings on the hindwing; the white markings suffused with very pale bluish green; the posterior two spots of the discal series on the forewing subequal; the postdiscal macular band on the hindwing with a tendency to obsolescence, varying from a narrow series of white lunules to a somewhat diffuse transverse narrow pale band. On the underside the ground colour is paler than in N. columella, the interspaces between the veins conspicuously much darker; the postdiscal and subterminal markings on both forewings and hindwings diffuse and very ill-defined. N. jumbah can also be recognized by the discal transverse series of comparatively large dark brown spots.

In the female the spots on the forewing and the subbasal band on the hindwing are comparatively broader than they are in the male; in the dry-season form of both sexes, as compared with the wet-season form, often conspicuously broader. Antennae, head, thorax and abdomen as in N. columella.

Wingspan 62–70 mm.

== Distribution ==
The species is found in southern India, the Nilgiris the Western Ghats, northeast India, Myanmar, the Andaman Islands and Sri Lanka. (Specimens from the Andamans have the lilacine-white terminal markings on the underside very broad and diffuse.)

== Larva ==
"Somewhat fusiform, anterior and anal segments narrowed, the middle segments being thickened laterally, aimed with two dorsal, long, anteriorly-divergent fleshy processes on the fourth segment, and two shorter posteriorly-divergent similar processes on the twelfth segment, also two very short dorsal spiny tubercles on the third and sixth segments. Head cleft and pointed at the vertex. Colour brownish-purple, anal segments dark purple-brown spotted with green and bordering an oblique line extending laterally from anal spine to base of spine on fourth segment; two short, oblique, dorsal anteriorly-oblique (?) lateral streaks along middle segments." (Moore.)

== Pupa ==
"Suspended vertically; slender in the abdominal part with a sharp dorsal ridge, much stouter and broader in the thoracic region; with wing-cases expanded laterally; two sharp points on. the head; colour varying from dark brown to dull white, suffused and touched at points with gold" (Davidson and Aitken)

== Gallery ==
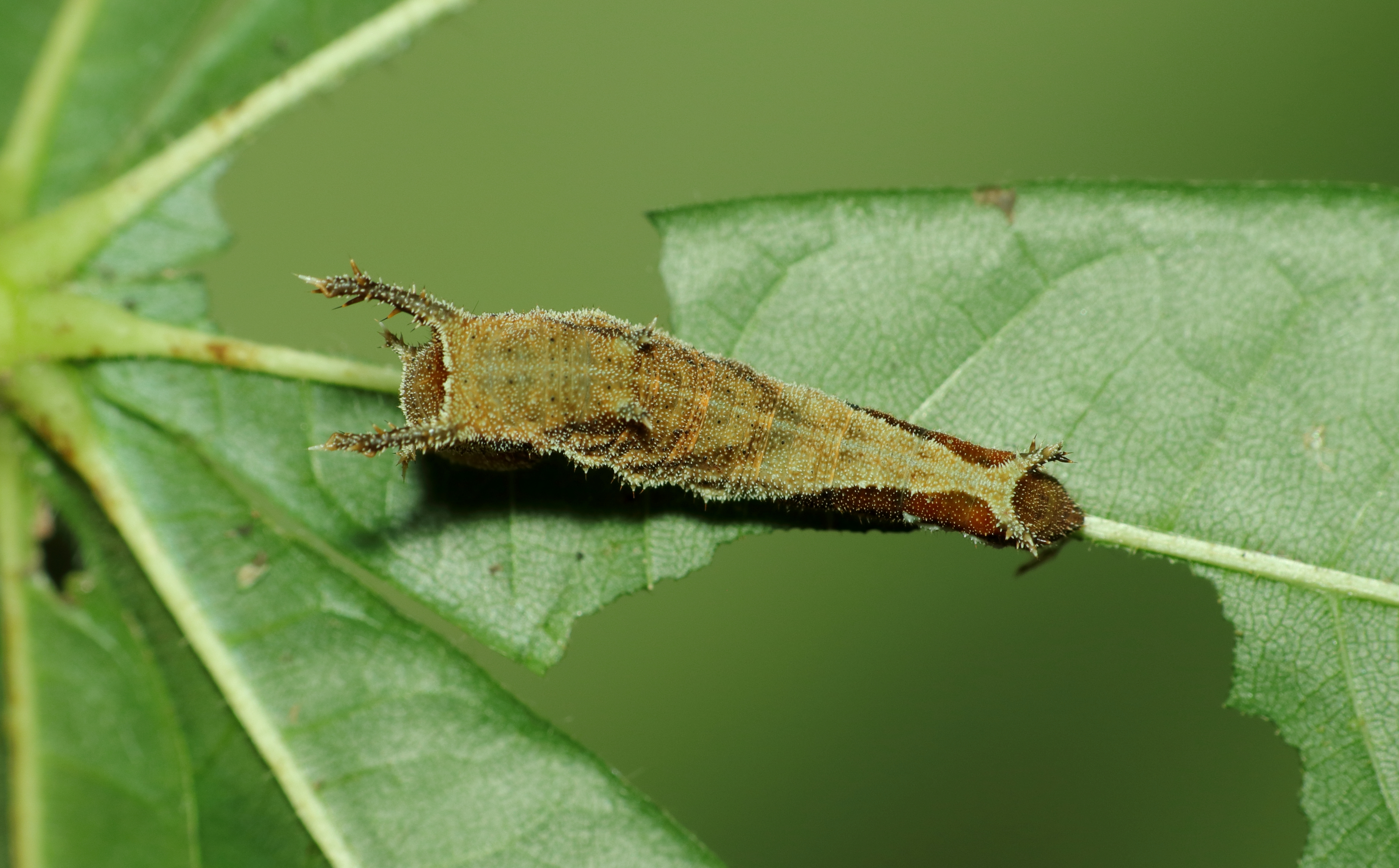
fifth instar caterpillar

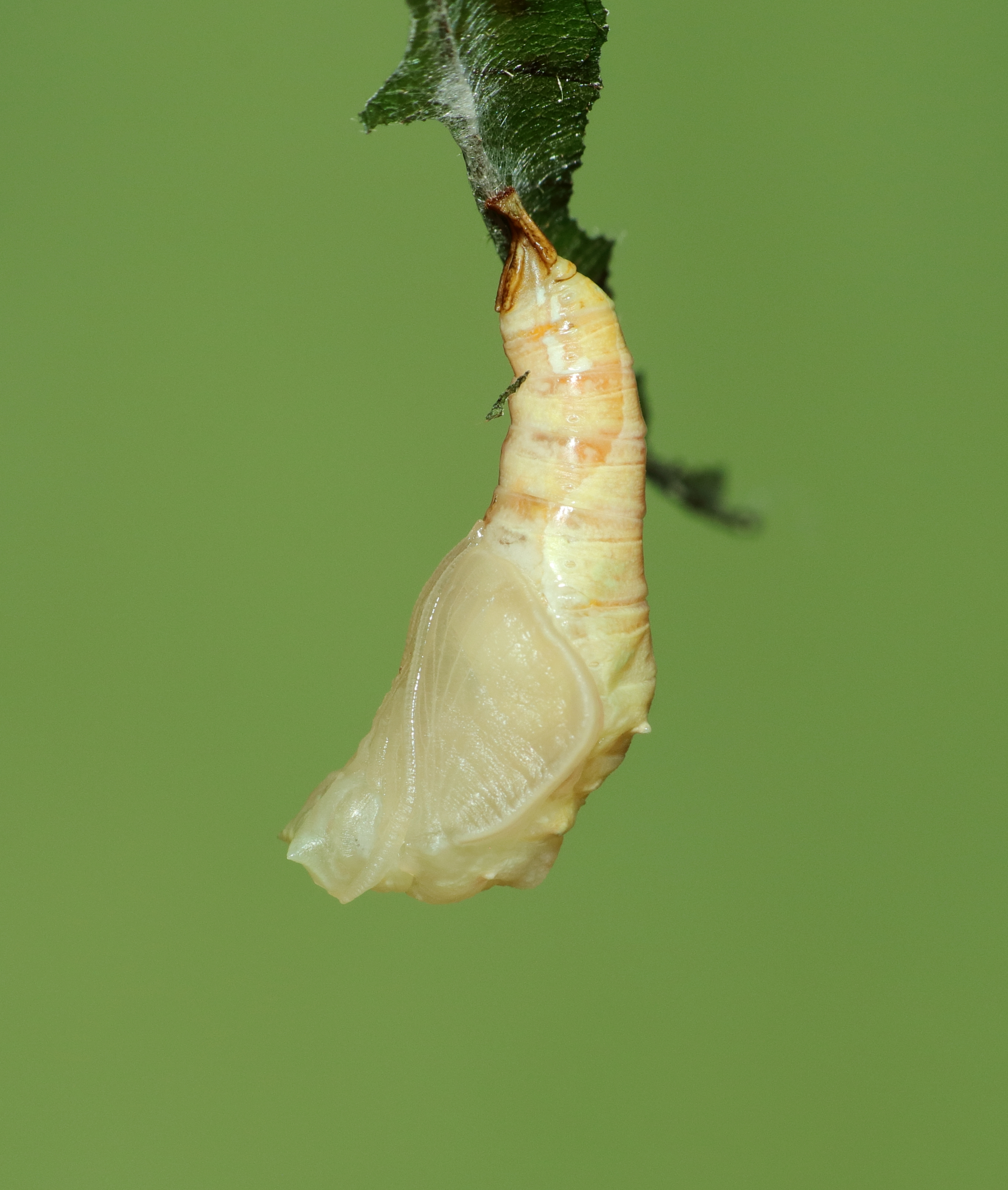
Freshly formed pupa

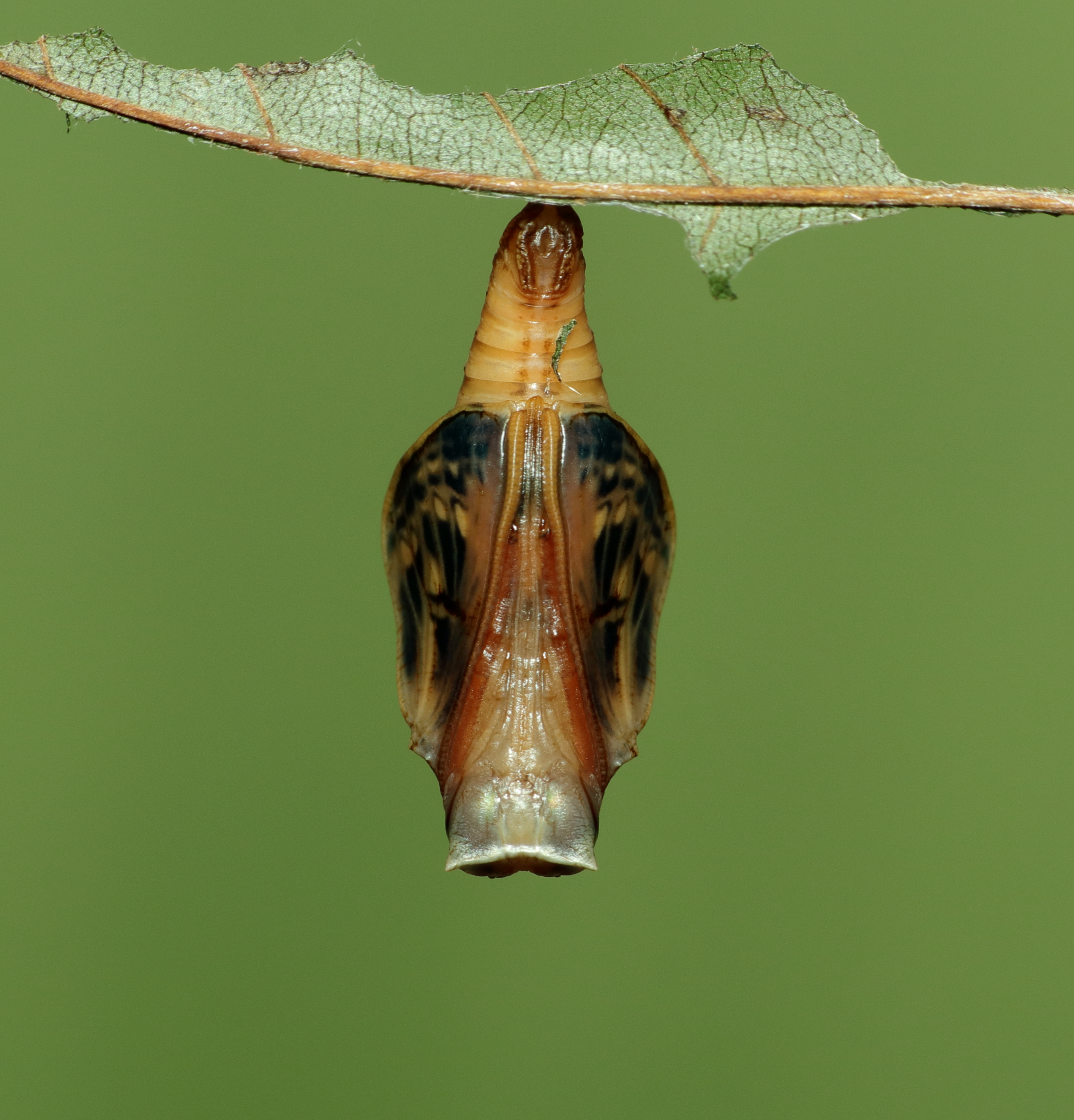
Mature pupa

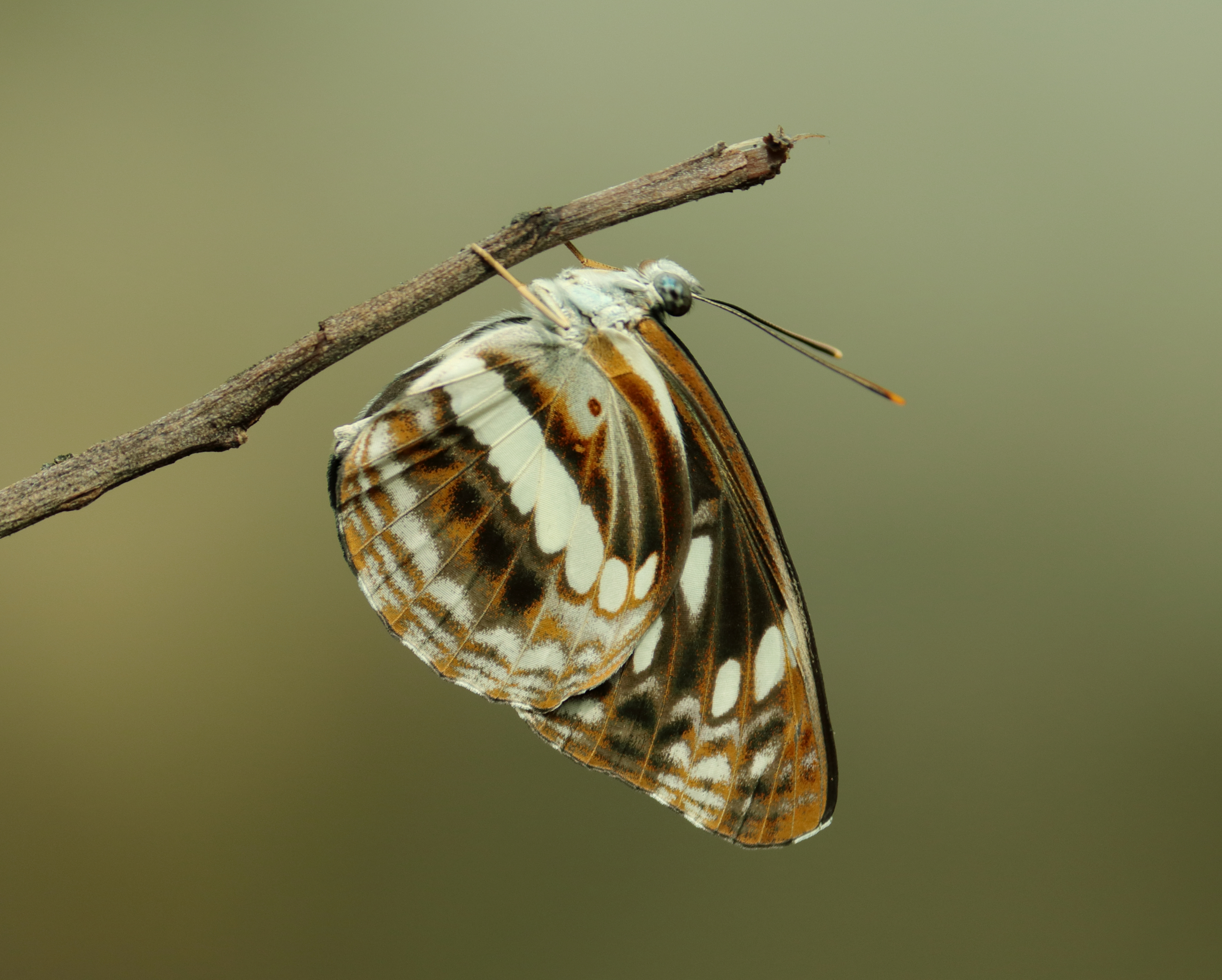
Newly eclosed

== See also ==
- List of butterflies of India
- List of butterflies of India (Nymphalidae)
