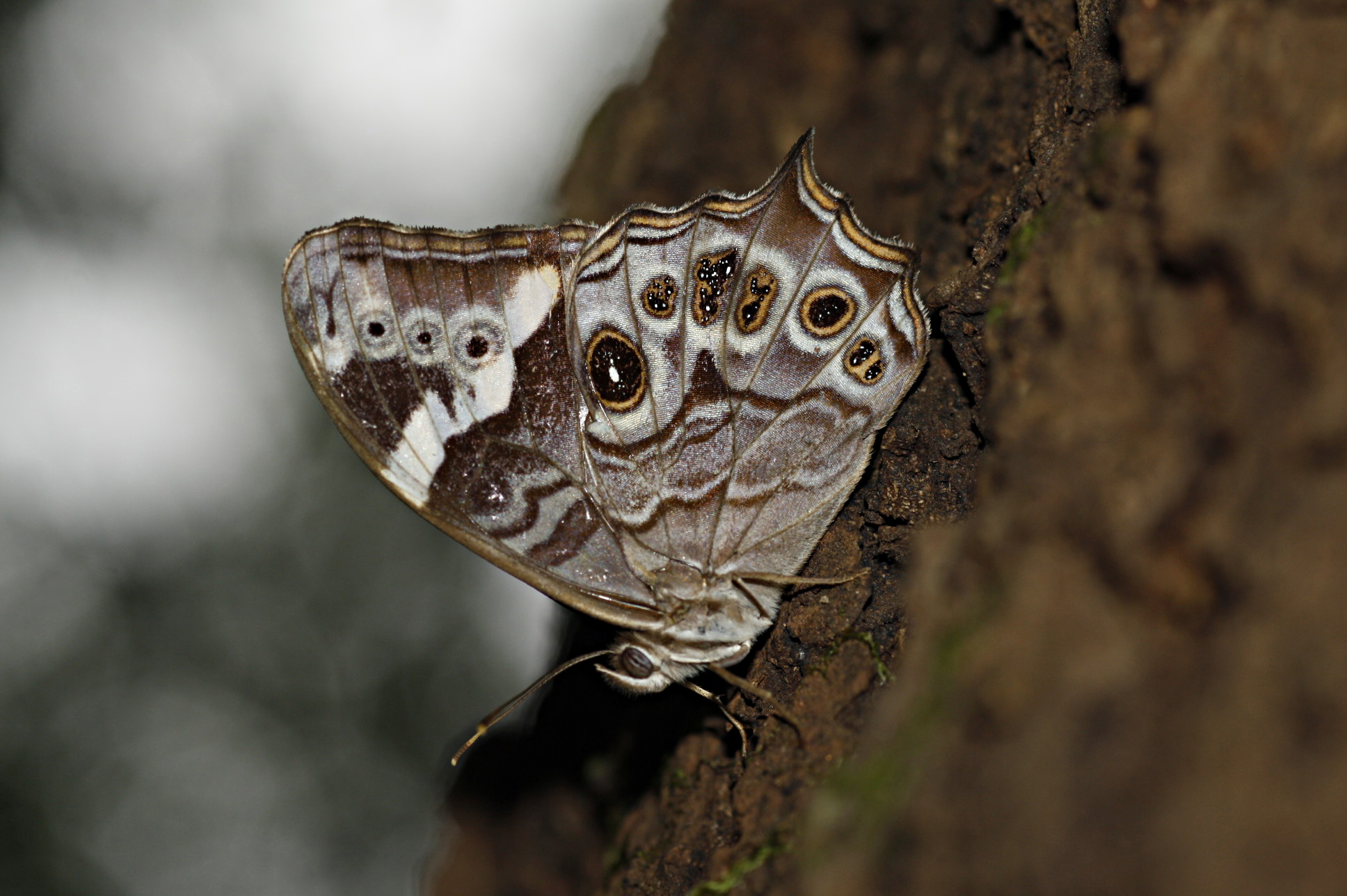

Scientific classification
- Kingdom: Animalia
- Phylum: Arthropoda
- Clade: Pancrustacea
- Class: Insecta
- Order: Lepidoptera
- Family: Nymphalidae
- Genus: Lethe
- Species: L. rohria

Binomial name
- Lethe rohria (Fabricius, 1787)

= Lethe rohria =

Common treebrown

Species of butterfly

Lethe rohria, also known as the common treebrown, is a species of satyrine butterfly found in Asia.

== Description ==
The forewings are coastal with two white periapical spots. The upper side towards the apex of the forewing is van Dyke brown. The hindwings are the ocelli (eyespots) of the underside showing through, sometimes forming two or three obscure black spots or two slender subterminal black lines. The underside is paler, shaded with dark brown. This includes more pronounced markings. The white discal band on forewing is prominent. The antennae, head, thorax and abdomen are brown, while antennas are periapically black at apex ochraceous.

Female upper side differs in having an oblique white, discal band on the forewing and a spot below its posterior end in interspace 1. The inner border of the band is bi-emarginate, while the outer is irregularly sinuous. Their upper side towards the apex of the forewing is van dyke brown, but darker than males.

== Range ==
L. rohria inhabit the Himalayas from India, Uttarakhand, Sikkim and Assam. This also includes Bhutan, Myanmar (Tenasserim), extending to China.

== Subspecies ==
=== Nilgiriensis ===
The male differs only from the male of the typical form in having an additional white spot on the upper side of the forewing placed terminally in interspace 2. The female differs from the female of the typical form in having on the upper side of the forewing the discal white band divided into three distinct well-separated white spots, and while the underside in the same band is distinctly narrower.

They inhabit predominantly central and southern India; it is recorded on the western side as far north as Mount Abu, Ceylon.

== Larva ==
The larvae are green, with darker dorsal and lateral stripes and an ochreous subdorsal strip. They are fusiform and elongated. Their head is conical. The vertex is prolonged to an acute point projecting forward and anal segment prolonged to a point projecting backwards. Their diet is grass.

== Gallery ==
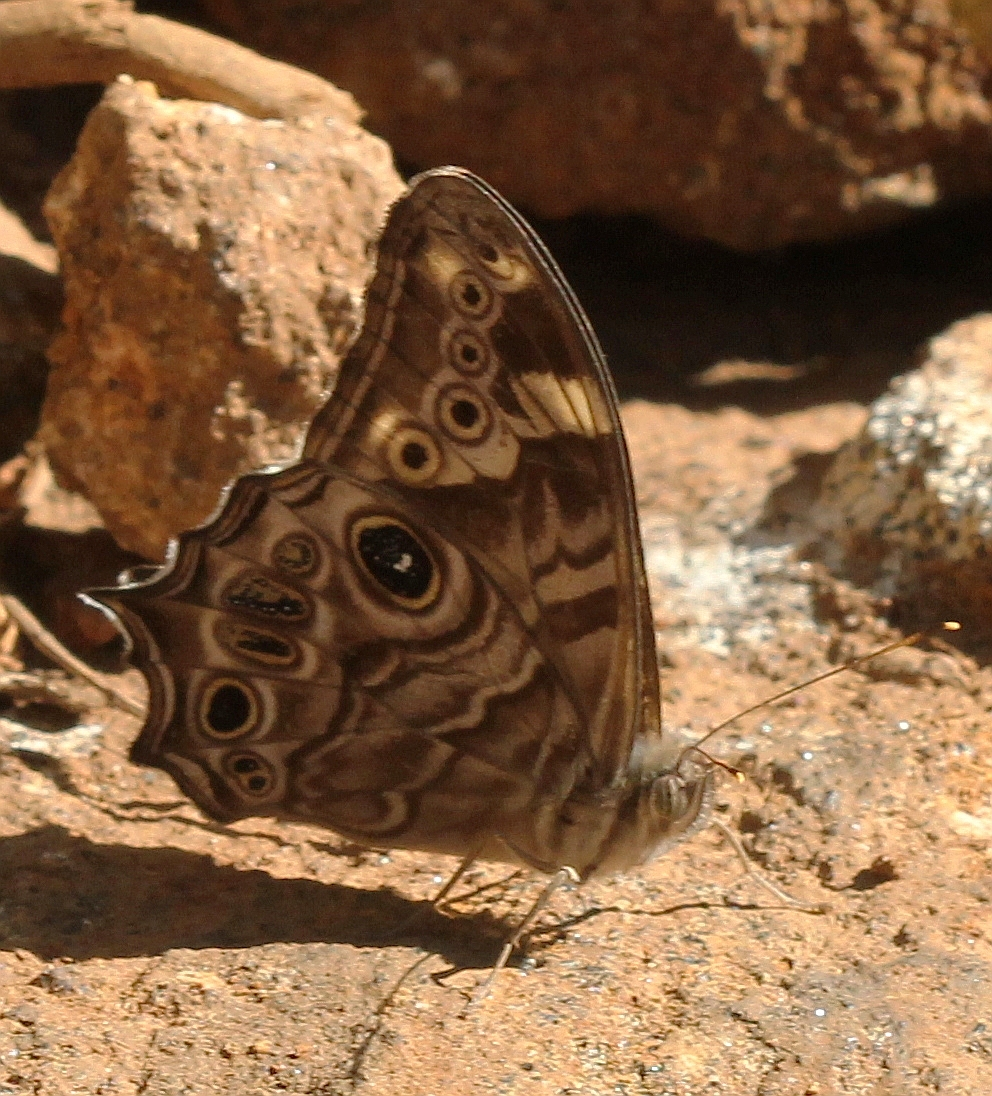

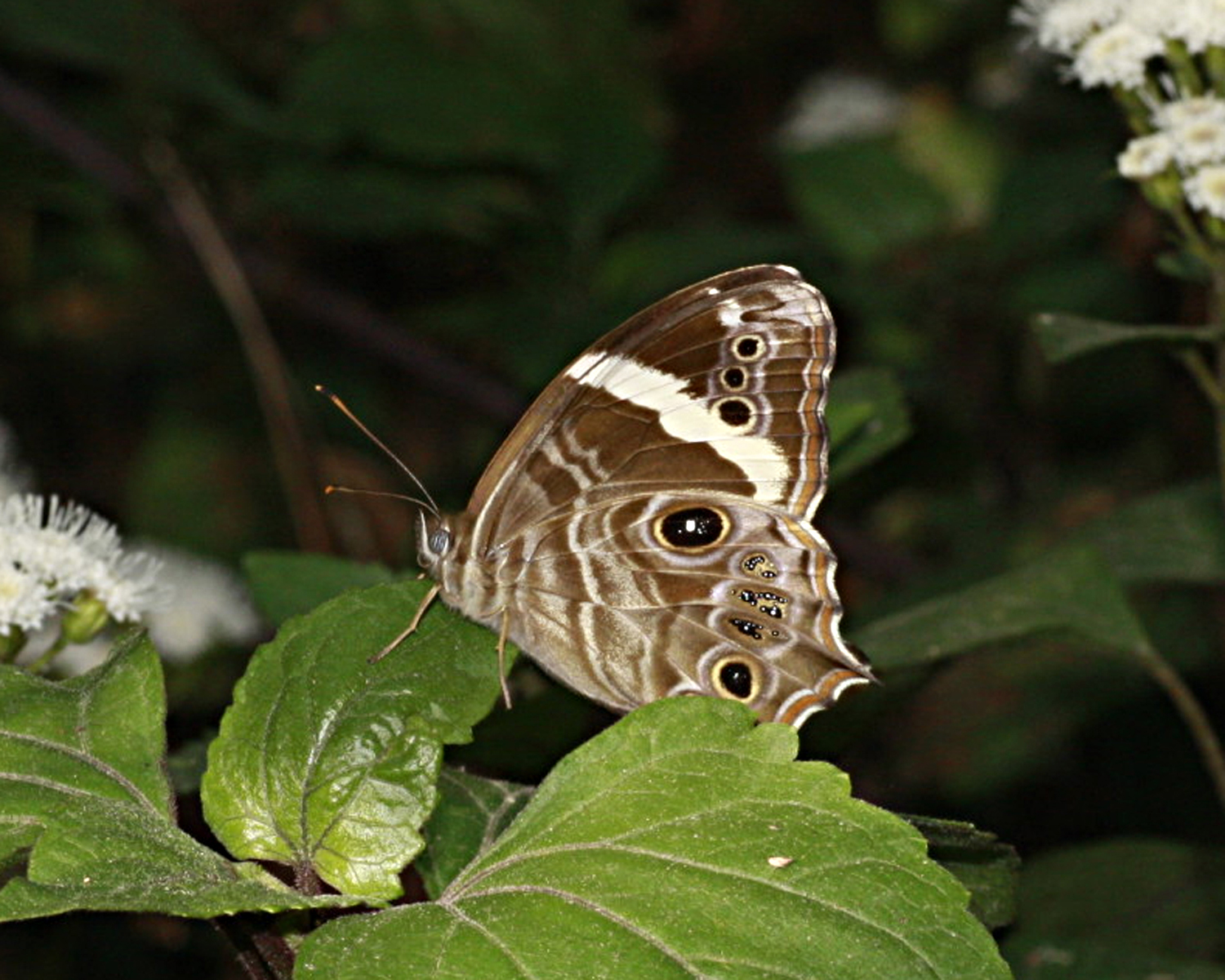
In the Morni Hills
