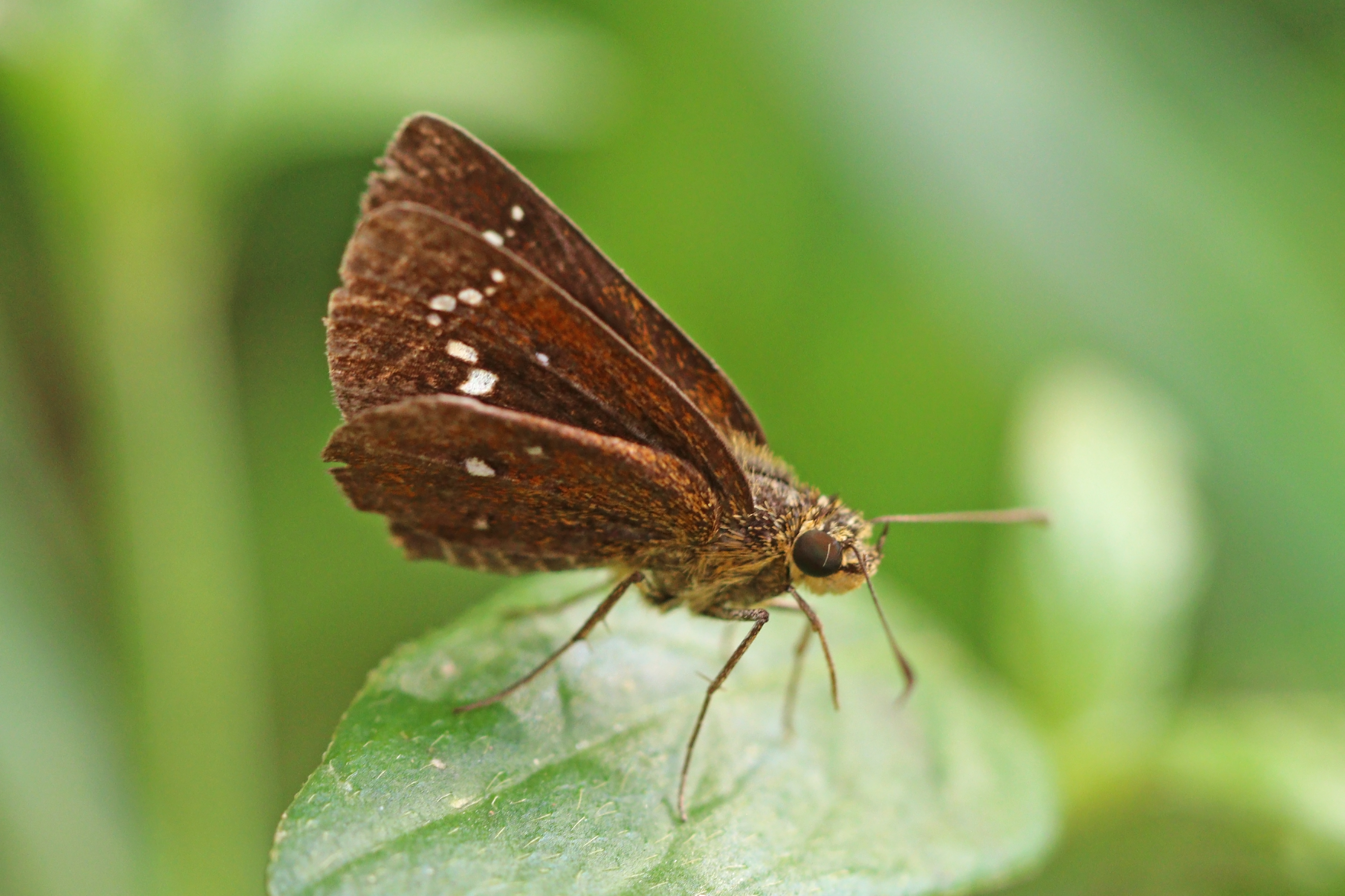

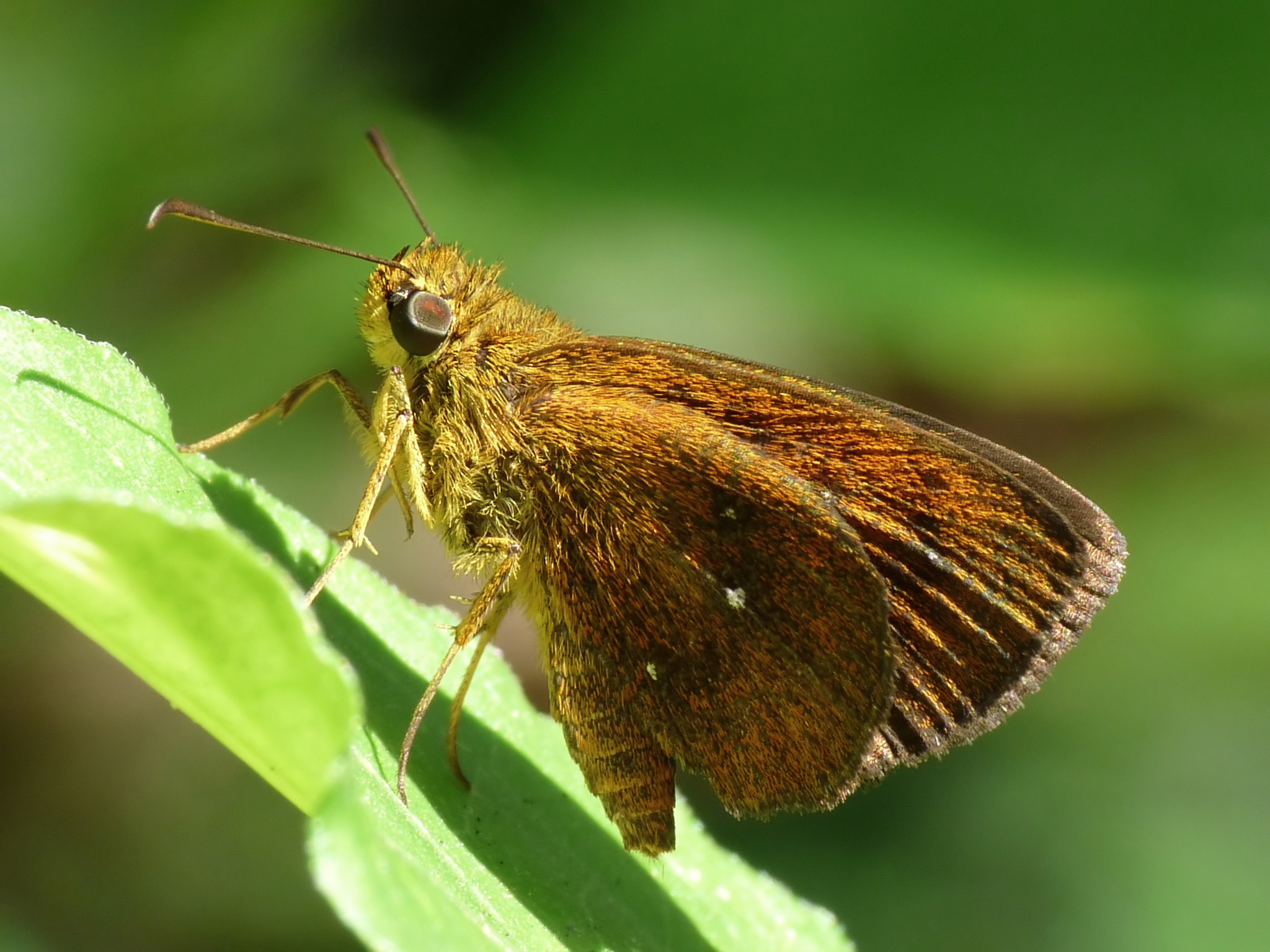
- both I. s. luteipalpis Kerala, India

Scientific classification
- Domain: Eukaryota
- Kingdom: Animalia
- Phylum: Arthropoda
- Class: Insecta
- Order: Lepidoptera
- Family: Hesperiidae
- Genus: Iambrix
- Species: I. salsala

Binomial name
- Iambrix salsala (Moore, 1865)

Synonyms
- Astictopterus salsala

= Iambrix salsala =

Species of butterfly

Iambrix salsala, the chestnut bob, is a butterfly belonging to the family Hesperiidae, that is found in parts of South Asia and Southeast Asia.

== Subspecies ==
The subspecies of Iambrix salsala found in India are-

- Iambrix salsala salsala Moore, 1865
- Iambrix salsala luteipalpis Plötz, 1886

== Range ==
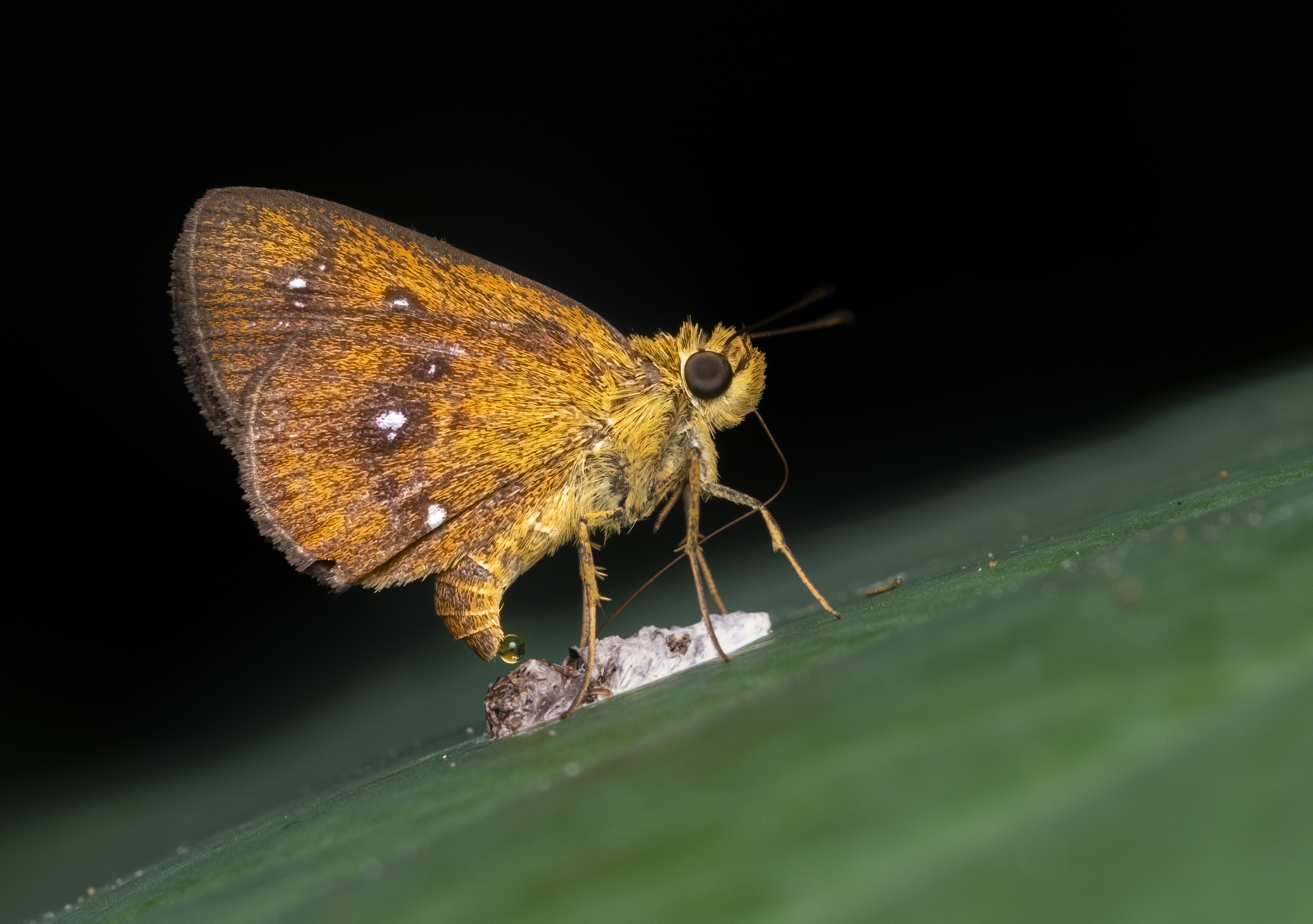
Puddling on a bird dropping

The butterfly occurs in Sri Lanka, India, Nepal, Myanmar, Thailand, Cambodia, Laos, north Vietnam, Hainan, Hong Kong, south Yunnan, Langkawi, Malaysia, Singapore, Tioman, Sumatra and Java.

In India, the butterfly flies in South India, Calcutta, along the Himalayas from Kumaon to Sikkim, Assam and eastwards to Myanmar.

Edward Yerbury Watson (1891) states the butterfly's range as follows:

Has been recorded from Bengal (Moore), Cachar (Wood-Mason and de Niceville); Tavoy (Elwes and de Niceville); Calcutta (de Niceville); Orissa (Taylor); Sikkim (de Niceville; Elwes). Recorded as A. stellifer from Ceylon (Hutchison, Wade, Mackwood); Poona, Bombay (Swinhoe); and the Nilgiris (Hampson).

== Description ==
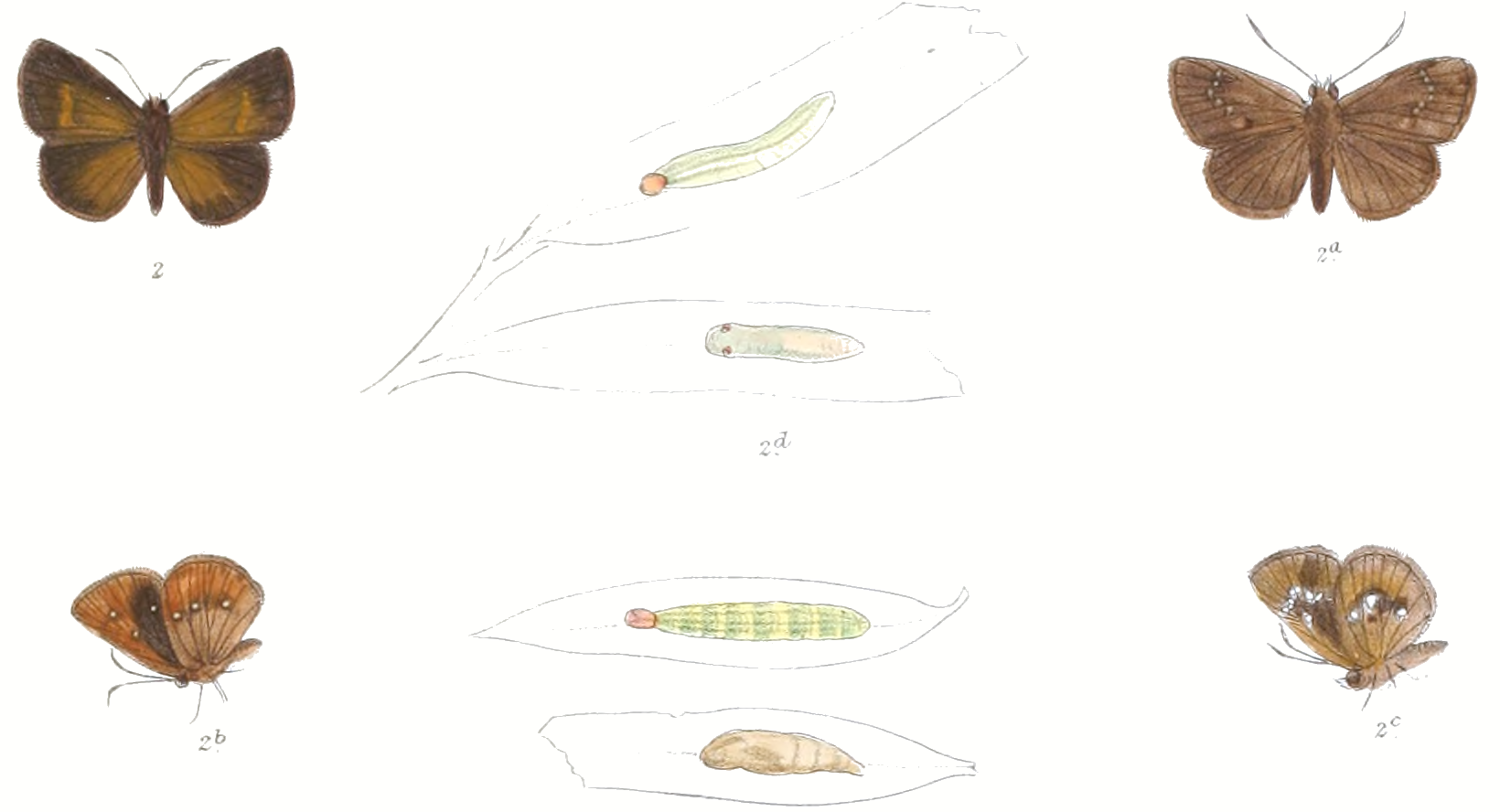

Watson (1891) gives a detailed description, shown below:

Male and female dark brown with olive-brown gloss. Male; upperside, forewing with two or three ill-defined yellowish spots ascending obliquely from beyond middle of posterior margin. Female; forewing with an oblique series of small semi-transparent white spots curving across the disc (more or less distinct), and terminated below by an ill-defined yellowish spot. Underside chestnut-brown suffused with black on the disc; forewing with minute white spots, one at extremity of the cell, and two or three obliquely beyond; hindwing with a series of three spots disposed in a curve across disc; cilia greyish-brown. Palpi, body, and legs yellowish beneath.

Mr. de Niceville states that he considers A. salsala to be identical with A. stellifer, though Mr. Moore informs him that the female of A. salsala has a curved discal row of seven white spots and two lower ochraceous discal spots, and is a larger species than A. stellifer, Butler. According to Mr. Elwes the two species are identical, Sikkim specimens varying considerably in the spots of the forewing above, which are sometimes white, sometimes rufous and sometimes absent as in stellifer.

I have numerous specimens of this species from Rangoon, Beeling, Upper Tenasserim, Madras, Kadur District, and Mysore; they vary considerably in the distinctness of the spots both on upperside and underside, but I can find no sure characteristic by which to separate them into two species.

— Edward Yerbury Watson

== Host plants ==
The larva has been recorded on Setaria barbata, Bambusa species, Mimosa species.
