= List of butterflies of Pakistan =

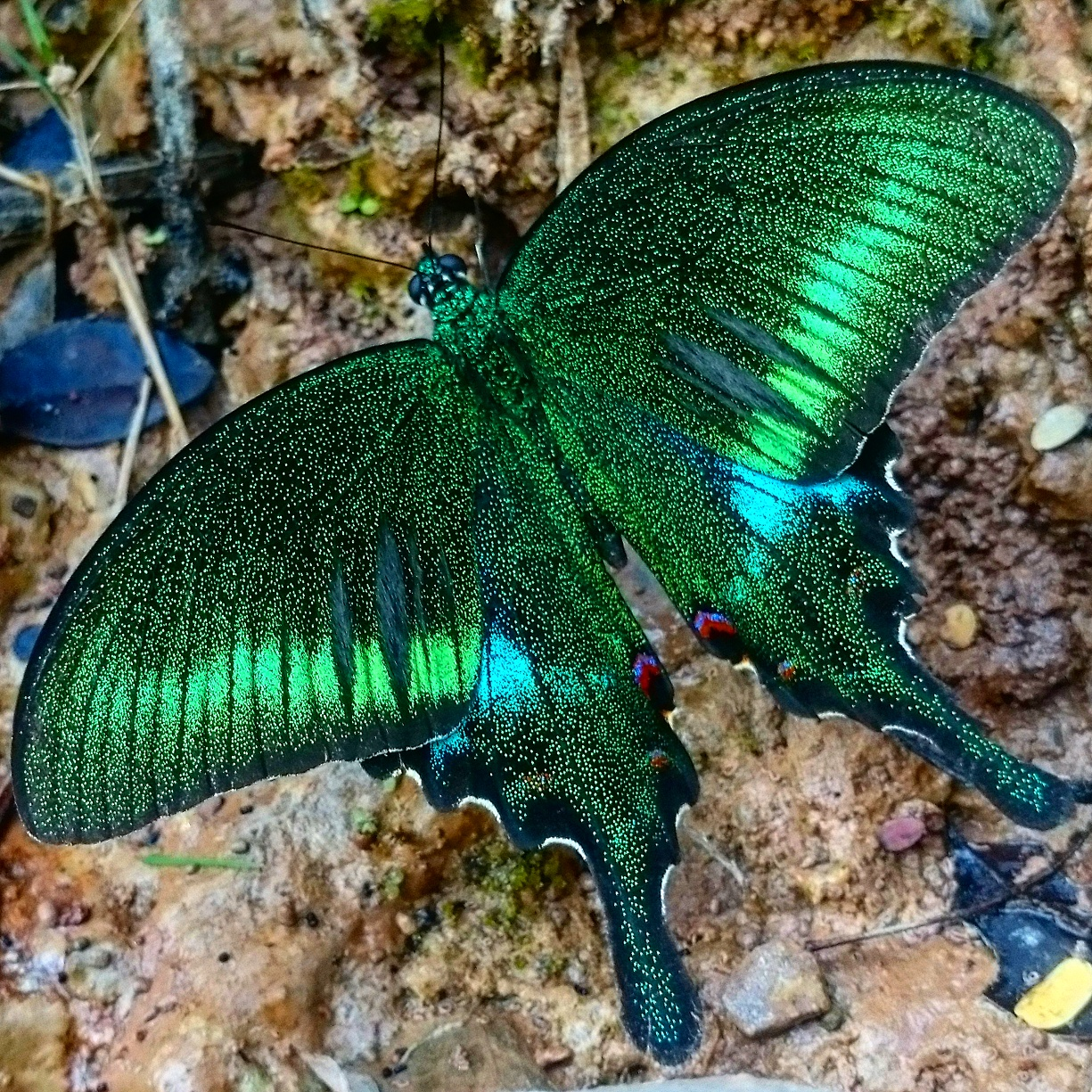
A Papilio polyctor in the lower Himalayas of Pakistan. This butterfly is found along the humid subtropical forests of the Himalayas.

Pakistan has a high diversity of biomes and landscapes, from the Floodplains of the Indus River consisting of xeric shrublands and tropical dry broadleaf forests to the dry western areas of the Iranian plateau and ranges like the Safed Koh, Hindu Kush, Ras Koh Range, as well as the Himalayas up north consisting of subtropical moist broadleaf forests, subtropical coniferous forests, temperate coniferous forest, temperate broadleaf and mixed forests and up to the Northwestern Himalayan alpine shrub and meadows, further up are the Karakoram, Pamir, upper slopes of the Hindu Kush and the Tibetan plateau forming Alpine steppe and tundra. All of this paired with two Biodiversity hotspots (Himalayas and Mountains of Central Asia) result in an incredibly high diversity with both the Indomalayan and Palearctic realms.

There are thought to be over 400 species of butterfly in the country. Apollos inhabit the high altitude cold areas, with the hypermnestra helios being found in the western deserts of Balochistan. Species like the papilio polyctors, kallima inachus and papilio protenor inhabit the dense jungles in the lower Himalayan subtropical moist forests. The Papilio demoleus can survive in a variety of biomes from dry to wet. The byblia ilithyia and pachliopta hector occur in the southernmost parts of the country in tropical grasslands and shrublands. The pachliopta aristolochiae and byasa dasarada are found in the temperate forests in the Himalayas. The papilio machaon is found throughout the Himalayas.

The following is a list of the butterflies of Pakistan.

== Family Papilionidae (Apollo butterflies and swallowtails) ==
Subfamily: Parnassiinae (Apollo butterflies)

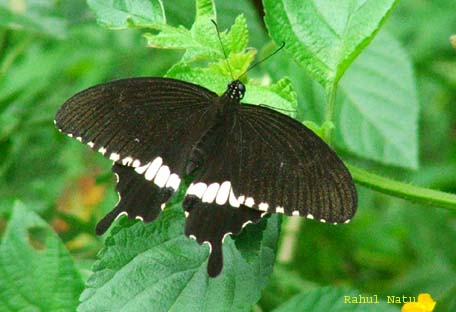
Common Mormon

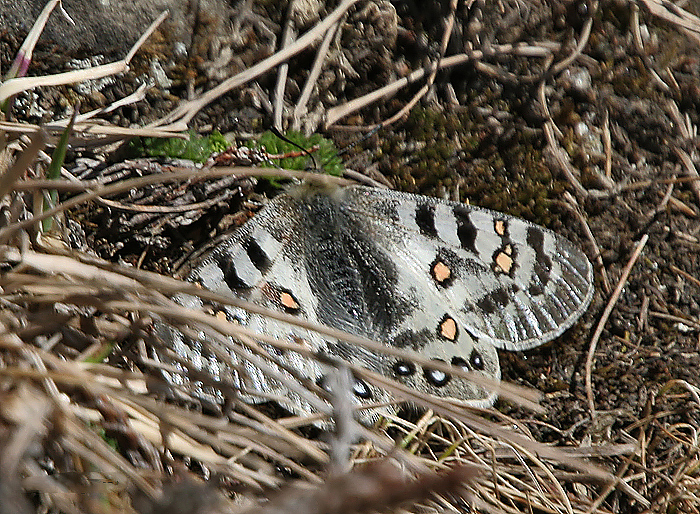
Common blue Apollo (Parnassius hardwickii)

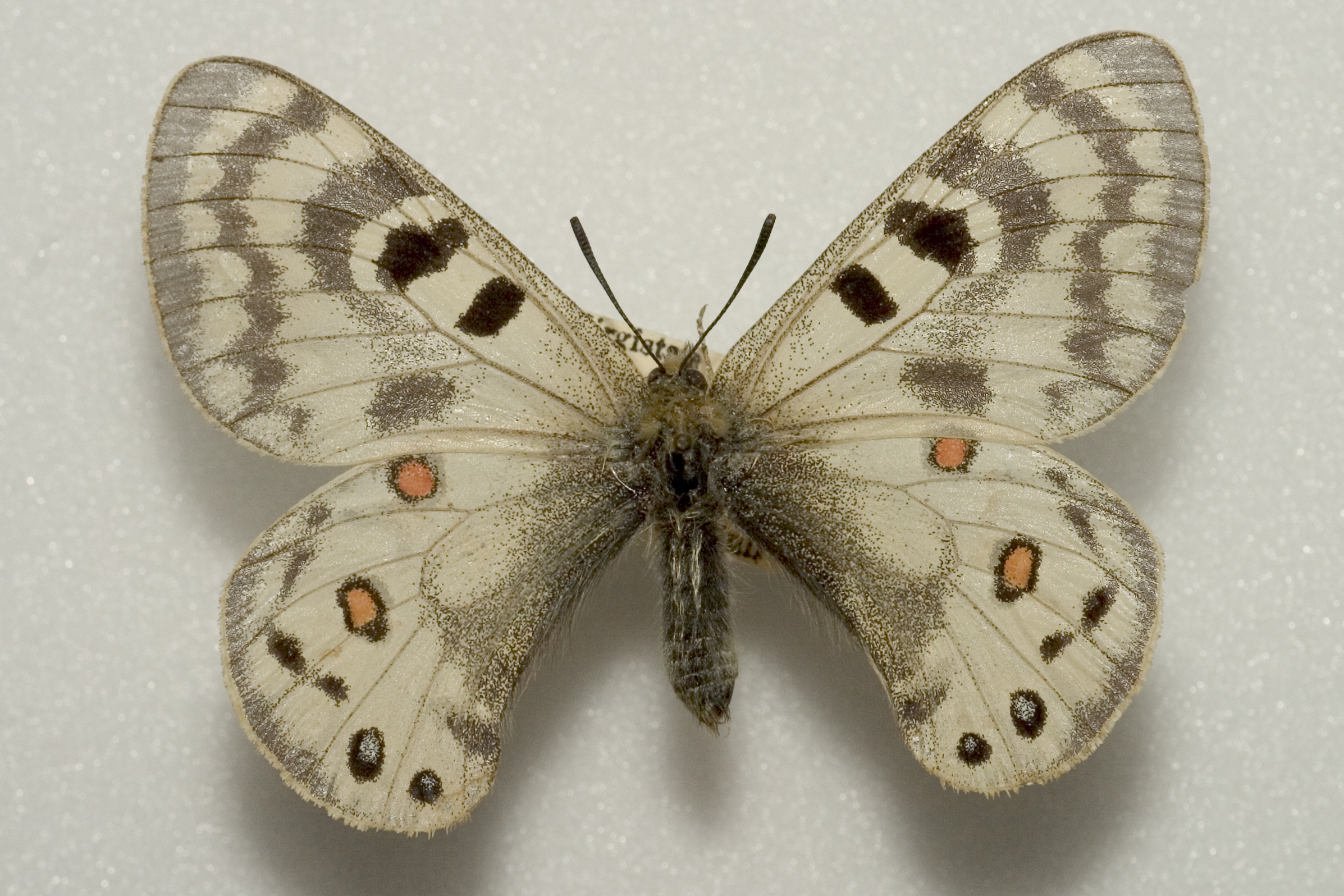
Banded Apollo (Parnassius delphius)

- Hypermnestra helios (desert Apollo)
- Parnassius acco (varnished Apollo)
- Parnassius actius (pale keeled Apollo)
- Parnassius jacquemontii (keeled Apollo)
- Parnassius tianschanica (large keeled Apollo)
- Parnassius boedromius
- Parnassius charltonius (regal Apollo)
- Parnassius delphius (kafir banded Apollo)
- Parnassius epaphus (common red Apollo)
- Parnassius hardwickii (common blue Apollo)
- Parnassius inopinatus
- Parnassius loxias
- Parnassius simo (black-edged Apollo)
- Parnassius staudingeri (Karakoram banded Apollo)
- Parnassius stenosemus (Pir Panjal banded Apollo)
- Parnassius stoliczkanus (Ladak banded Apollo)
- Parnassius cardinalis (Astor banded Apollo)

Subfamily: Papilioninae (swallowtails, peacocks and mimes)

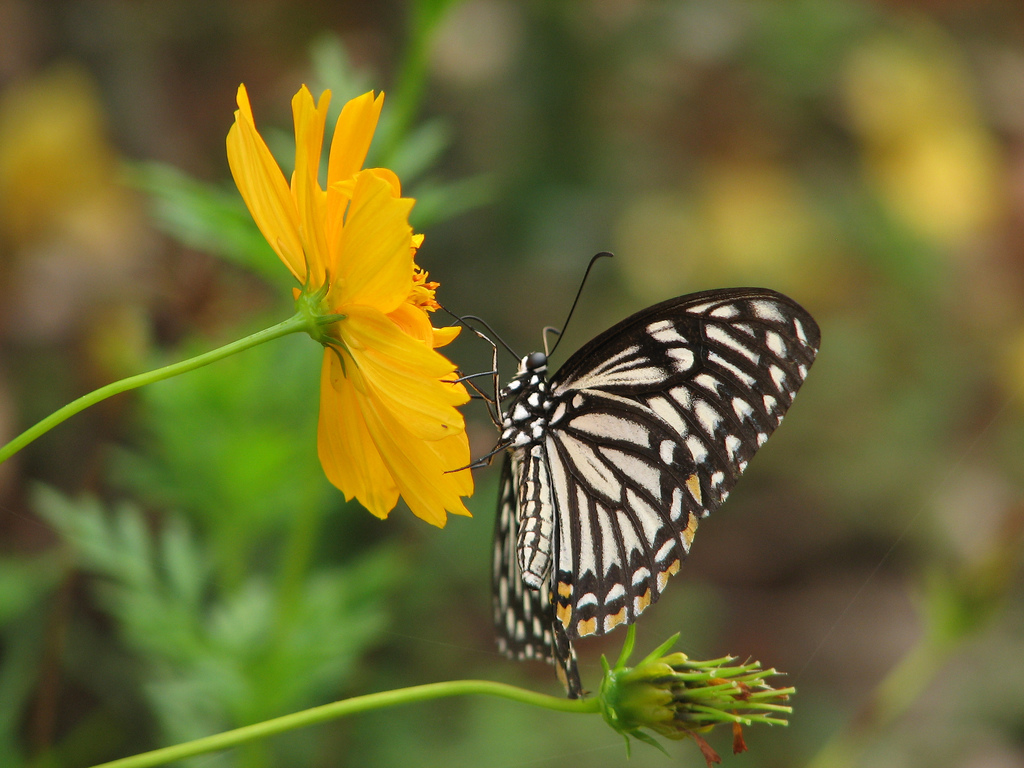
Common mime (Papilio clytia)

- Papilio agestor (tawny mime)
- Papilio clytia or Chilasa clytia (common mime)
- Graphium cloanthus (glassy bluebottle)
- Graphium sarpedon (common bluebottle)
- Graphium doson (common jay)
- Iphiclides podalirius (scarce swallowtail)
- Papilio alexanor (Alexanor or southern swallowtail or Baluchi yellow swallowtail)
- Papilio arcturus (blue peacock)
- Papilio polyctor (common peacock or Indian peacock)
- Papilio demoleus (lemon butterfly or lime butterfly)
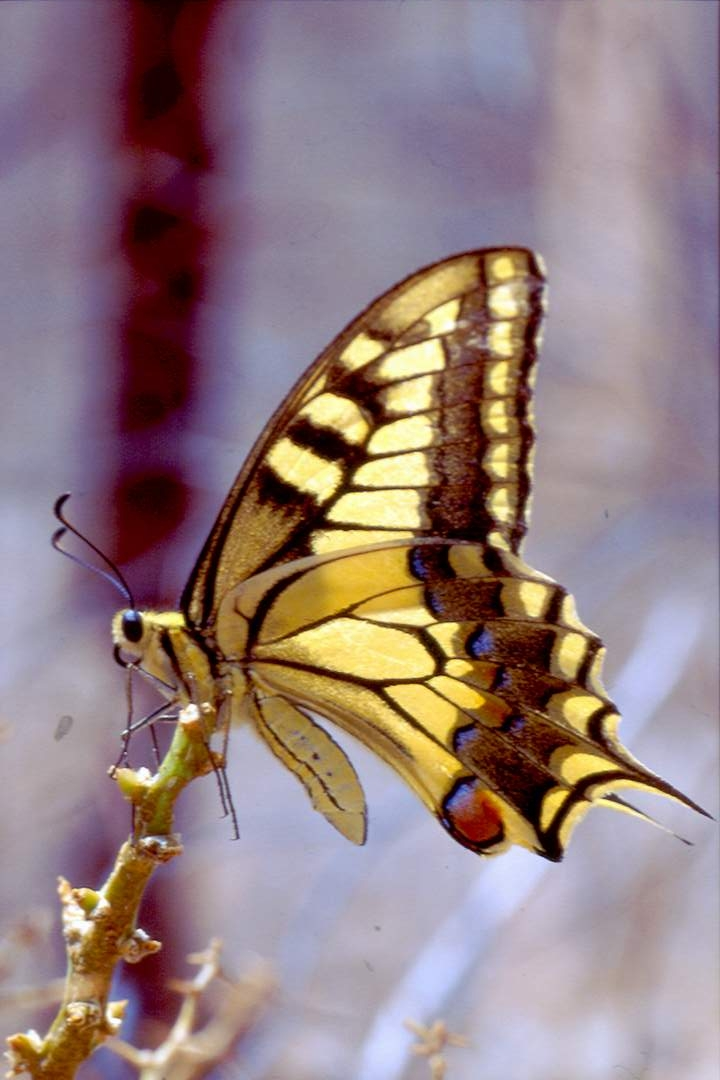
  Old World swallowtail (Papilio machaon)
- Papilio machaon (common yellow swallowtail)
- Papilio polytes (common Mormon)
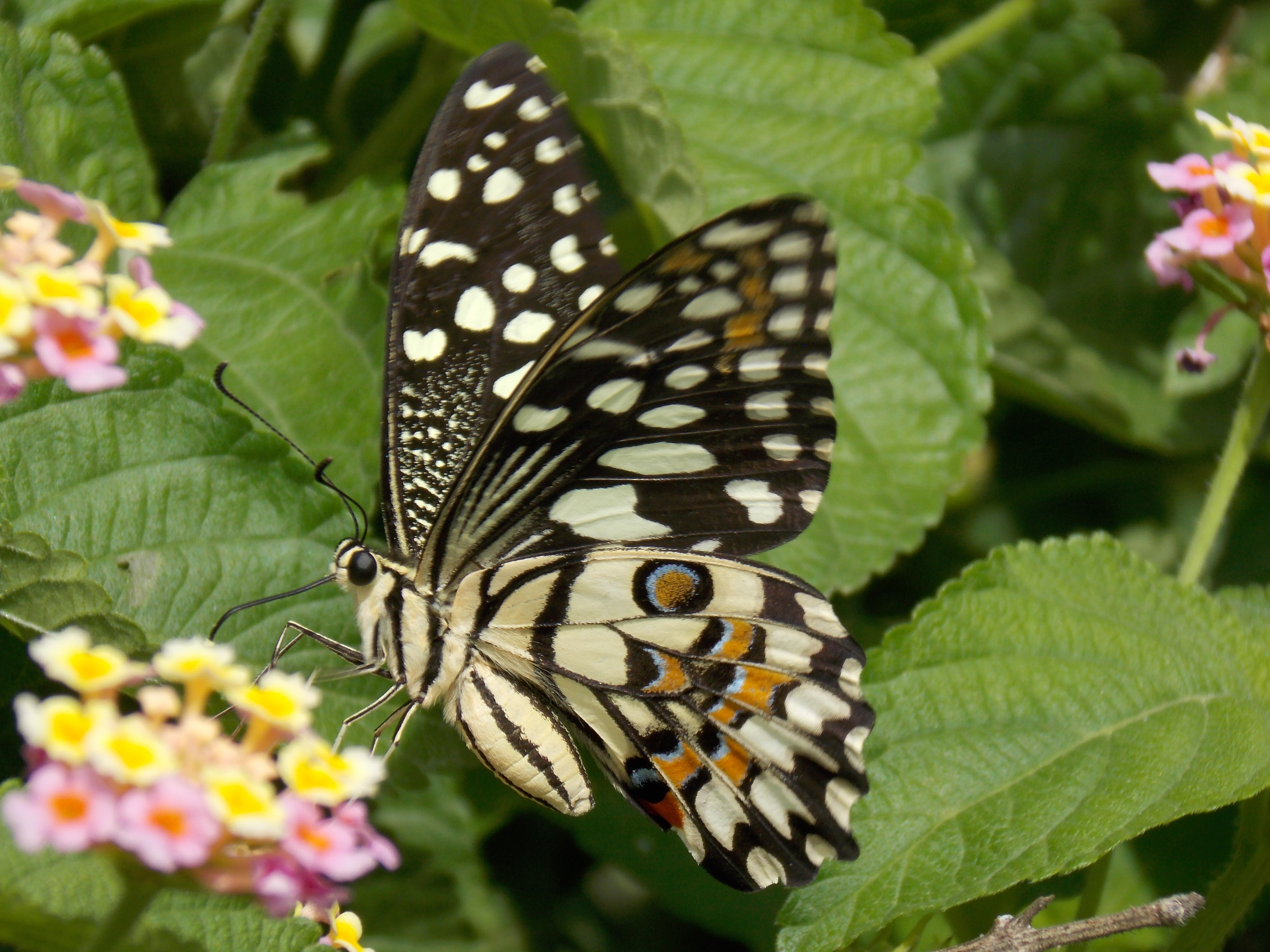
  Papilio demoleus, Taxila
- Papilio protenor (spangle)
- Atrophaneura polyeuctes (common windmill)
- Byasa dasarada (great windmill)
- Byasa latreillei (rose windmill)
- Pachliopta aristolochiae (common rose)
- Pachliopta hector (crimson rose)

== Family Pieridae (whites and yellows) ==
Subfamily: Pierinae (whites)

- Leptosia nina (Psyche)
- Baltia shawi (Shaw's dwarf)
- Baltia butleri (Butler's dwarf or two-spotted dwarf)
- Euchloe charlonia (lemon white)
- Euchloe lucilla (pale lemon white)
- Euchloe belemia (striped white)
- Euchloe daphalis (pearl white)
- Pontia chloridice (lesser Bath white)
- Pontia callidice (lofty Bath white or peak white)
- Pontia daplidice (Bath white)
- Pontia glauconome (desert Bath white)
- Pieris devta (Chitral green-banded white)
- Pieris ajaka (Himalayan green-veined white or Murree green-veined white)
- Pieris deota (alpine or Kashmir large white)
- Pieris canidia (Asian cabbage white)
- Pieris rapae (small cabbage white)
- Pieris brassicae (large cabbage white)
- Aporia leucodice (Himalayan blackvein)
- Aporia nabellica (dusky blackvein)
- Delias belladonna (hill Jezebel)
- Delias sanaca (pale Jezebel)
- Delias eucharis (common Jezebel)
- Belenois aurota (pioneer)
- Cepora nerissa (common gull)
- Pareronia hippia (Indian wanderer)
- Appias libythea (western striped albatross)

Subfamily: Coliadinae (yellows)

- Catopsilia pomona (common emigrant or lemon migrant butterfly)
- Catopsilia pyranthe (mottled emigrant or white migrant butterfly)
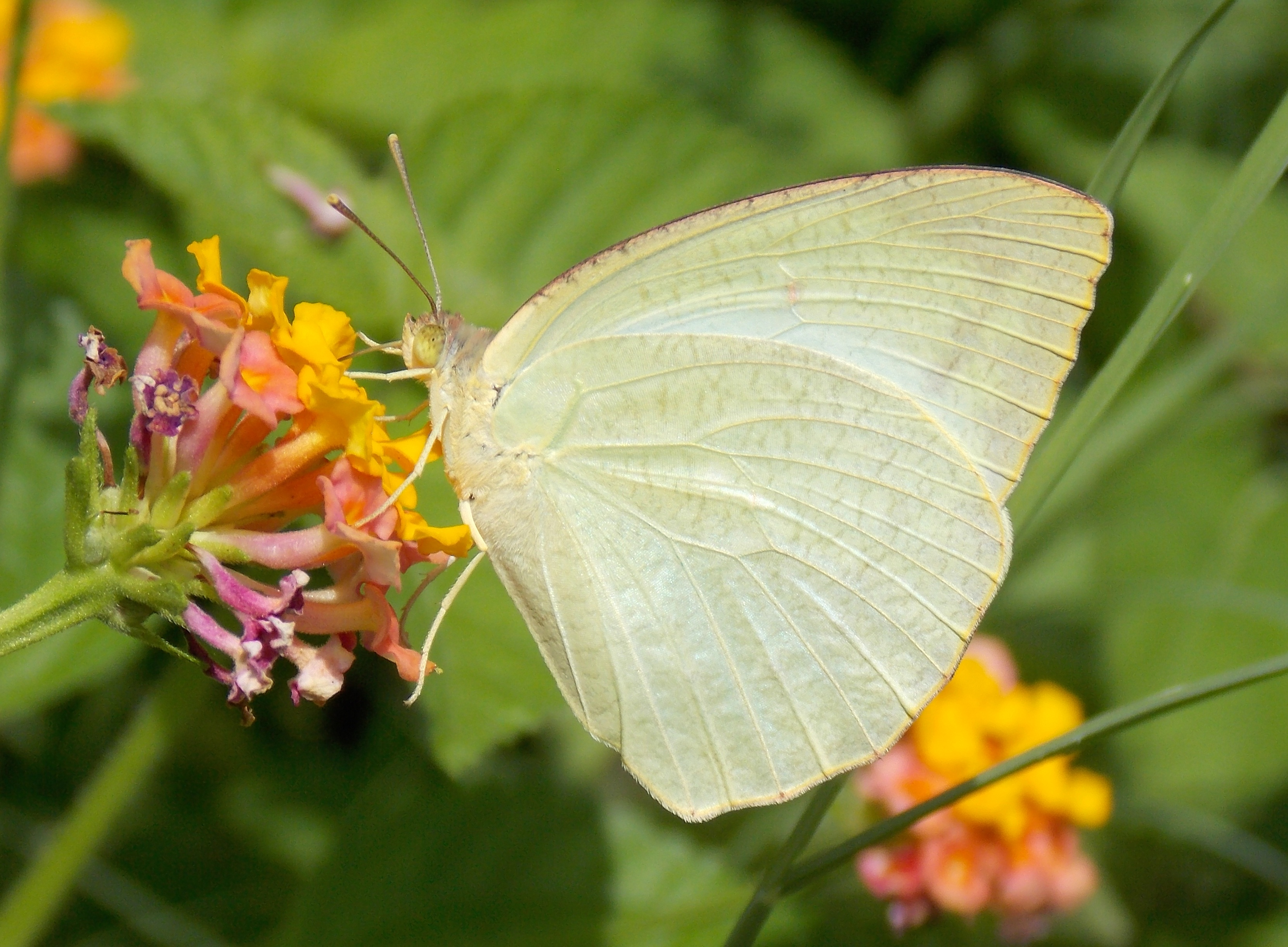
  Catopsilia pyranthe, Taxila
- Ixias pyrene (yellow orangetip)
- Ixias marianne (white orangetip) not confirmed
- Eurema hecabe (common grass yellow)
- Eurema brigitta (small grass yellow)
- Eurema laeta (short-bordered or spotless grass yellow)
- Eurema blanda (three-spot grass yellow)
- Gonepteryx rhamni (common brimstone)
- Gonepteryx mahaguru (lesser brimstone)
- Gonepteryx farinosa (Chitral brimstone) (subspecies G. f. chitralensis)
- Colias fieldii (dark clouded yellow)
- Colias erate (pale clouded yellow)
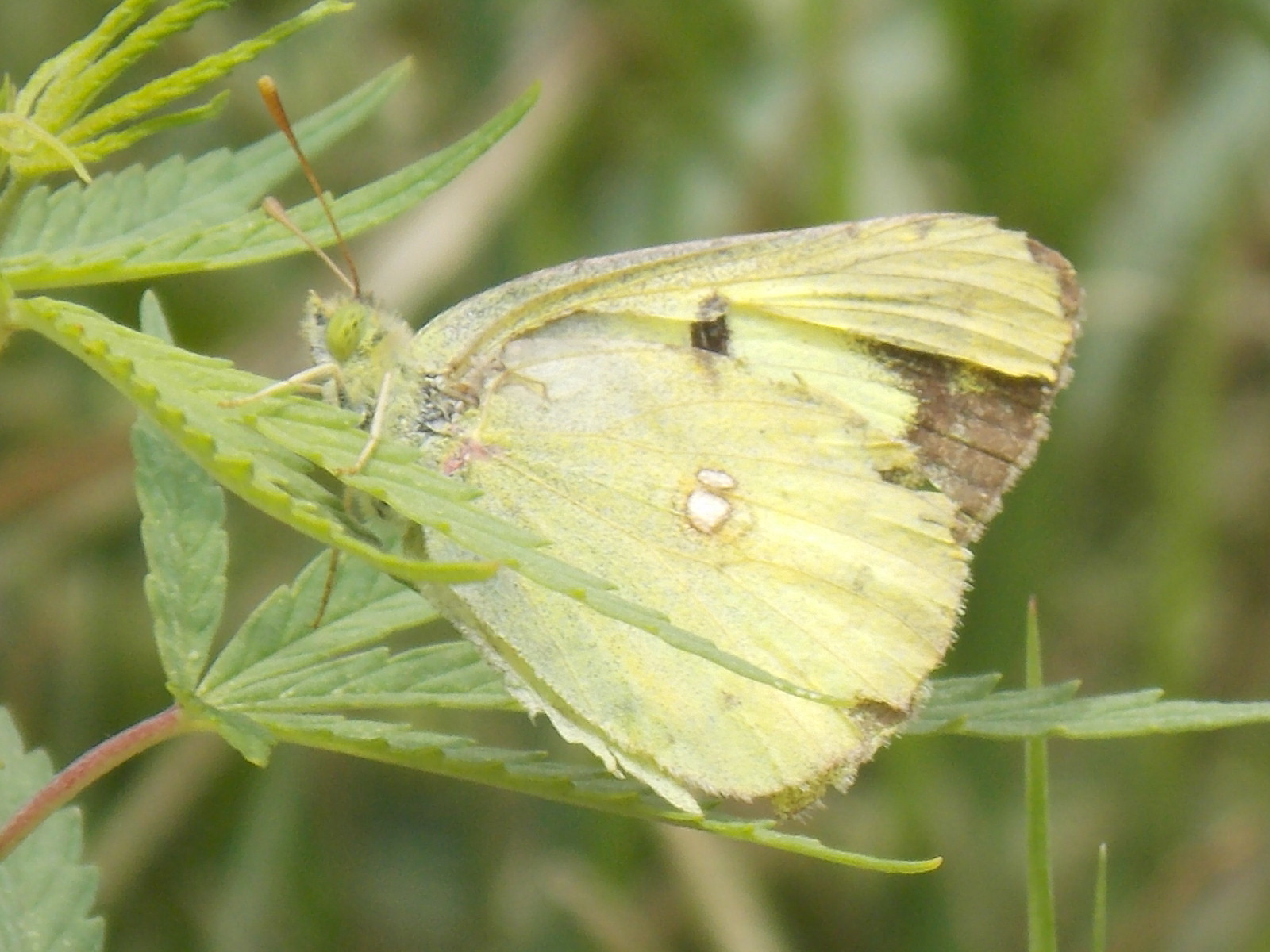
  Colias erate, Taxila
- Colias marcopolo (Marcopolo's clouded yellow)
- Colias alpherakii (green clouded yellow)
- Colias wiskotti (broad-bordered clouded yellow)
- Colias stoliczkana (orange clouded yellow)
- Colias cocandica (Pamir clouded yellow)
- Colias ladakensis (Ladak clouded yellow)
- Colias eogene (fiery clouded yellow)
- Colias leechi (glaucous clouded yellow)
- Colotis amata (small salmon Arab)
- Colotis protractus (blue-spotted Arab)
- Colotis vestalis (white Arab)
- Colotis fausta (large salmon Arab)
- Colotis liagore (desert orangetip)
- Colotis etrida (little or small orangetip)
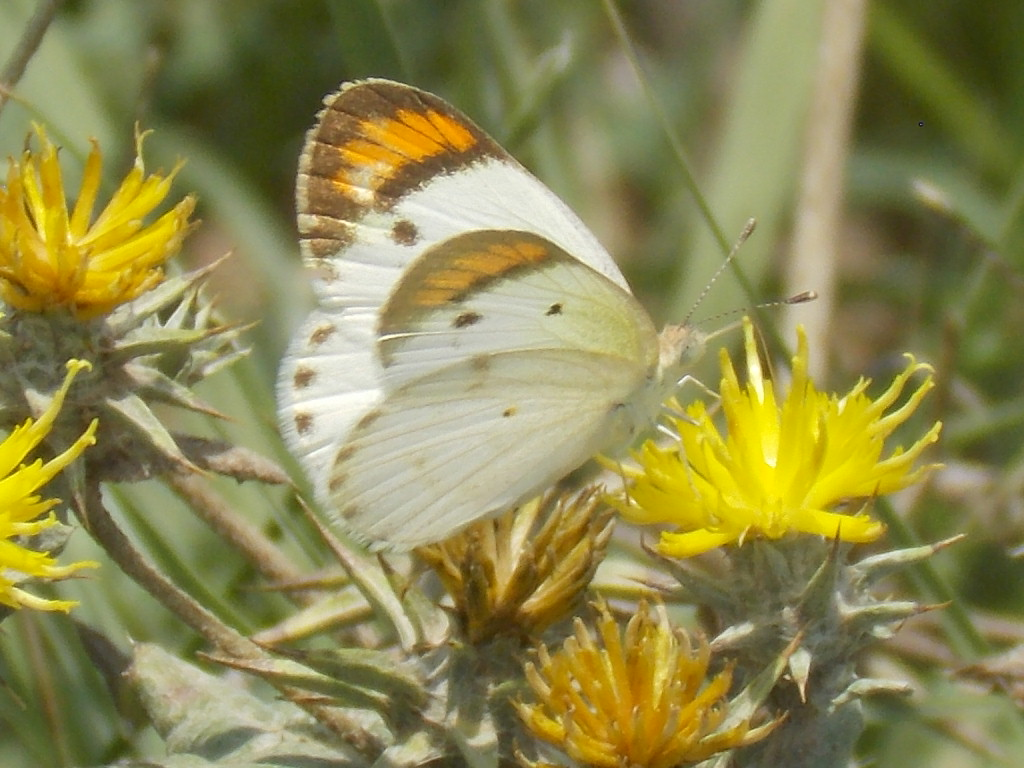
  Colotis etrida, Taxila
- Colotis danae (crimsontip or scarlet-tip)

== Family Nymphalidae (brush-footed butterflies) ==
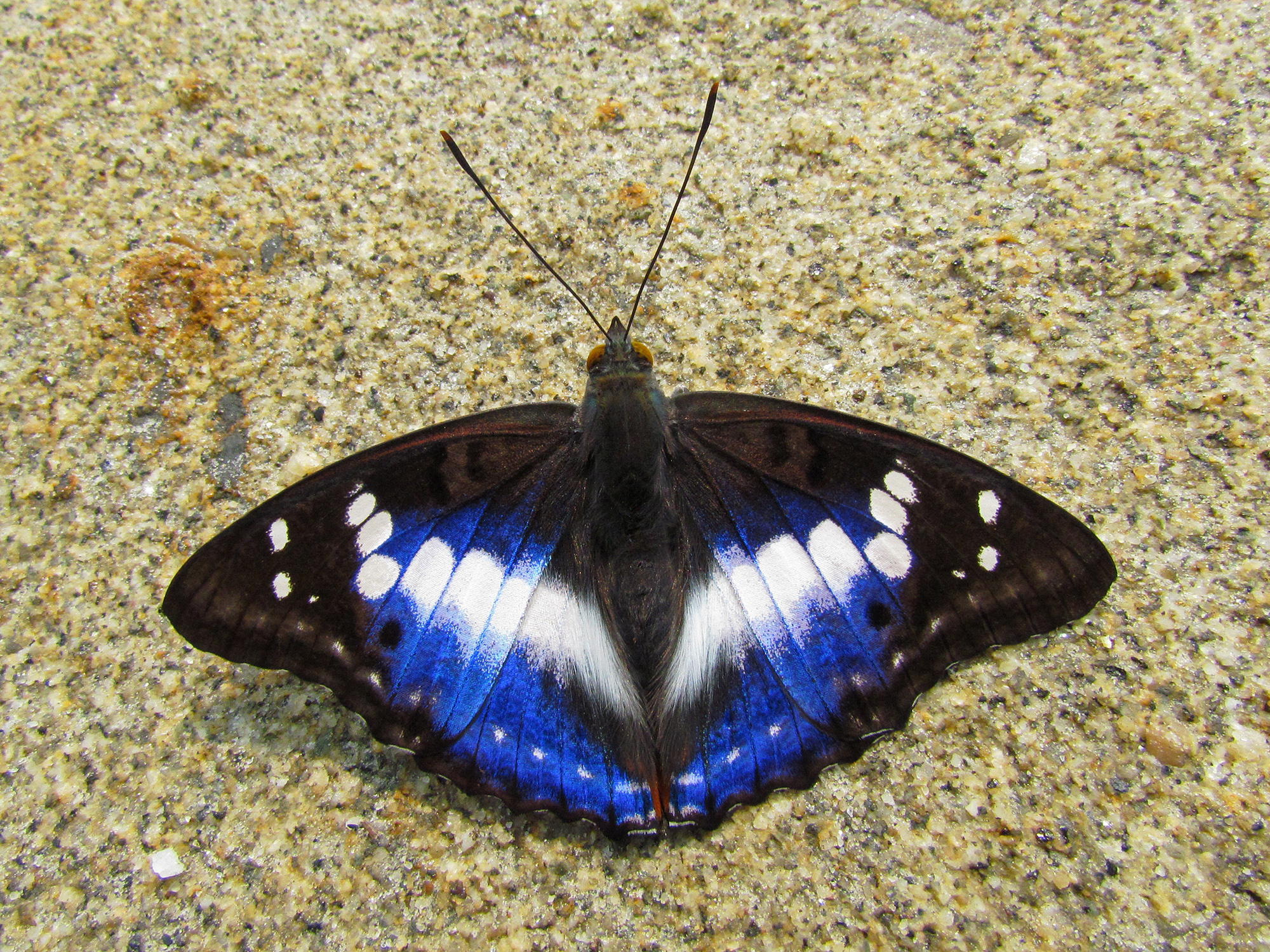
Indian purple emperor

This huge family is represented in Pakistan by following 11 subfamilies:

- Charaxinae 3 species
- Apaturinae 5 species
- Calinaginae 1 species
- Biblidinae 2 species
- Nymphalinae 29 species
- Cyrestinae 1 species
- Pseudergolis 1 species
- Limenitidinae 9 species
- Heliconiinae 16 species
- Danainae 5 species
- Libytheinae 2 species
- Satyrinae 56 species

Subfamily: Charaxinae (leafwings)

- Polyura athamas (common nawab)
- Charaxes agrarius (anomalous nawab)
- Charaxes solon (black rajah)

Subfamily: Apaturinae (emperors and allies)

- Apatura ambica (Indian purple emperor)
- Hestina nicevillei (scarce siren)
- Sephisa dichroa (western courtier)
- Limenitis lepechini (Chitral white admiral)
- Limenitis trivena (Indian white admiral)

Subfamily: Calinaginae (freaks)

- Calinaga buddha (freak)

Subfamily: Biblidinae (castors etc.)

- Ariadne merione (common castor)
- Byblia ilithyia (joker)

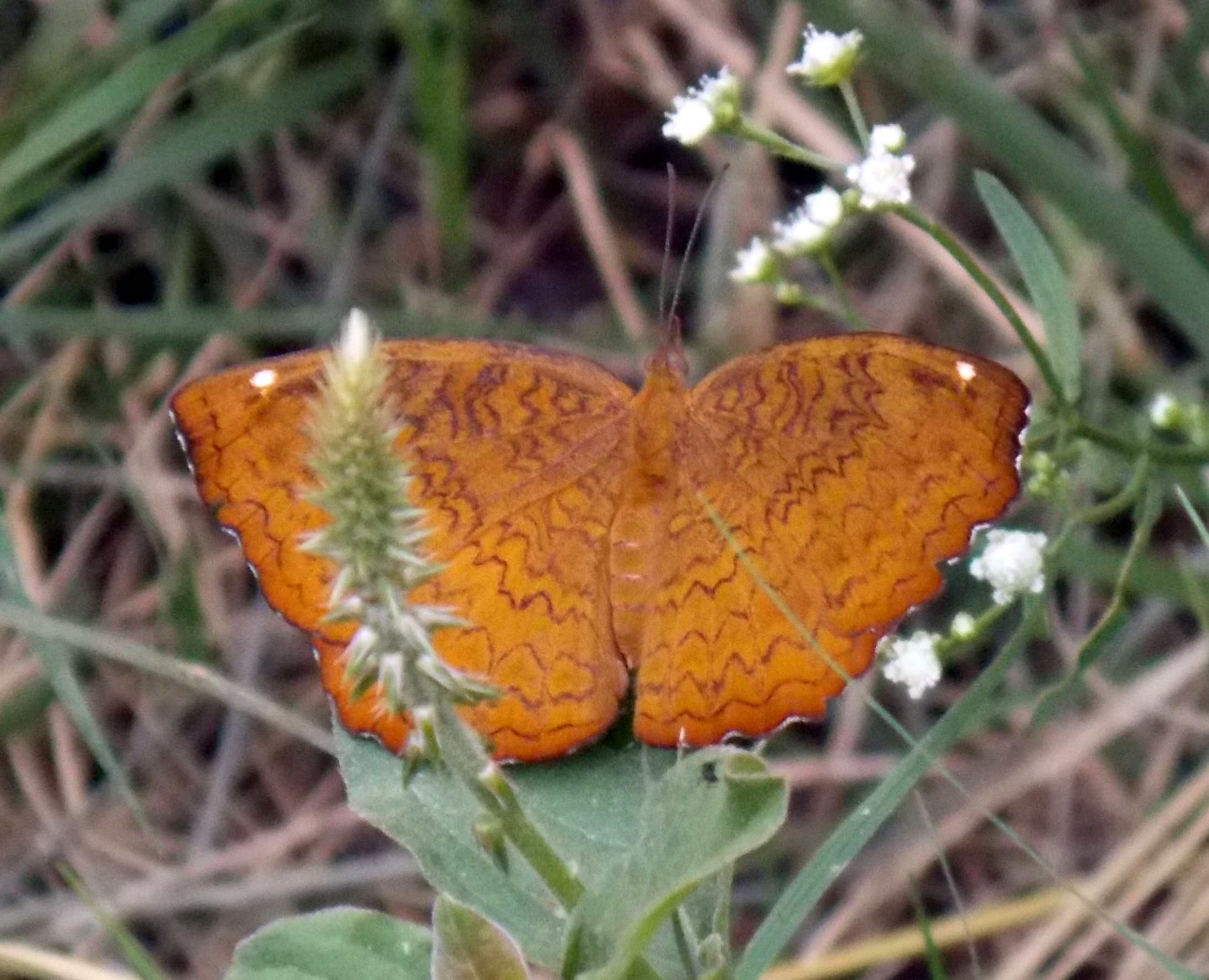
Ariadne merione in Taxila

Subfamily: Nymphalinae (nymphs, fritillaries, pansies, eggflies, etc.)

- Junonia hierta (yellow pansy)
- Junonia orithya (blue pansy)
- Junonia almana (peacock pansy)
- Junonia lemonias (lemon pansy)
- Junonia iphita (chocolate pansy or chocolate soldier)
- Junonia atlites (grey pansy)
- Vanessa indica (Indian red admiral)
- Vanessa atalanta (red admiral)
- Vanessa cardui (painted lady)
- Kaniska canace (blue admiral)
- Polygonia egea (eastern comma)
- Polygonia c-album (comma)
- Nymphalis vaualbum (false comma or comma tortoiseshell)
- Nymphalis xanthomelas (large tortoiseshell or scarce tortoiseshell or yellow-legged tortoiseshell)
- Nymphalis polychloros (blackleg large tortoiseshell)
- Aglais caschmirensis (Indian tortoiseshell)
- Aglais rizana (mountain tortoiseshell)
- Hypolimnas misippus (Danaid eggfly)
- Hypolimnas bolina (great eggfly)
- Kallima inachus (orange oakleaf)
- Melitaea shandura (Shandur fritillary)
- Melitaea persea, M. p. dodgsoni (Persian fritillary or desert fritillary)
- Melitaea lutko (Balochi fritillary)
- Melitaea trivia, M. t. robertsi (lesser spotted fritillary)
- Melitaea didyma, M. d. mixta mixta (spotted fritillary or red-band fritillary or fiery fritillary)
- Melitaea chitralensis (Chitral redband fritillary)
- Melitaea minerva (Pamir fritillary)
- Melitaea arcesia, M. s. balbita (blackvein fritillary)
- Melitaea ala or Melitaea pseudoala

Subfamily: Cyrestinae (maps)

- Cyrestis thyodamas (common map butterfly)

Subfamily: Pseudergolis (tabbies)

- Pseudergolis wedah (tabby)

Subfamily: Limenitidinae (sergeants, sailers, barons, etc.)

- Auzakia danava (commodore)
- Limenitis trivena (Indian white admiral)
- Limenitis lepechini (Chitral white admiral)
- Athyma opalina (hill sergeant or Himalayan sergeant)
- Neptis sappho (Pallas's sailer or common glider)
- Neptis clinia (clear sailer or southern sullied sailer)
- Neptis mahendra (Himalayan sailer)
- Neptis zaida (pale-green sailer)
- Pantoporia hordonia (common lascar)
- Neptis soma (sullied sailer)
- Neptis nata (clear sailer)
- Euthalia aconthea (common baron)
- Euthalia patala (grand duchess)

Subfamily: Heliconiinae (heliconians or longwings)

- Phalanta phalanta (common leopard)
- Acraea violae (tawny coster or Indian acraea) synonym: Telchinia violae
- Acraea issoria (yellow coaster)
- Vagrans egista (vagrant)
- Issoria lathonia (Queen of Spain fritillary)
- Issoria isaea (Himalayan queen fritillary)
- Argynnis hyperbius (tropical or Indian fritillary)
- Argynnis pandora pasargades (cardinal or western silverstripe)
- Argynnis childreni (large silverstripe or Himalayan fritillary)
- Speyeria aglaja (dark green fritillary)
- Fabriciana jainadeva
- Fabriciana kamala (common silverstripe)
- Fabriciana argyrospilata (Afghan fritillary)
- Clossiana jerdoni (Jerdon's silverspot)
- Clossiana hegemone (whitespot (false) fritillary)
- Boloria pales (straightwing silverspot or shephard`s fritillary)

Subfamily: Danainae (milkweed butterflies)

- Tirumala limniace (blue tiger)
- Danaus genutia (common or striped tiger or Indian monarch)
- Danaus chrysippus (plain tiger)
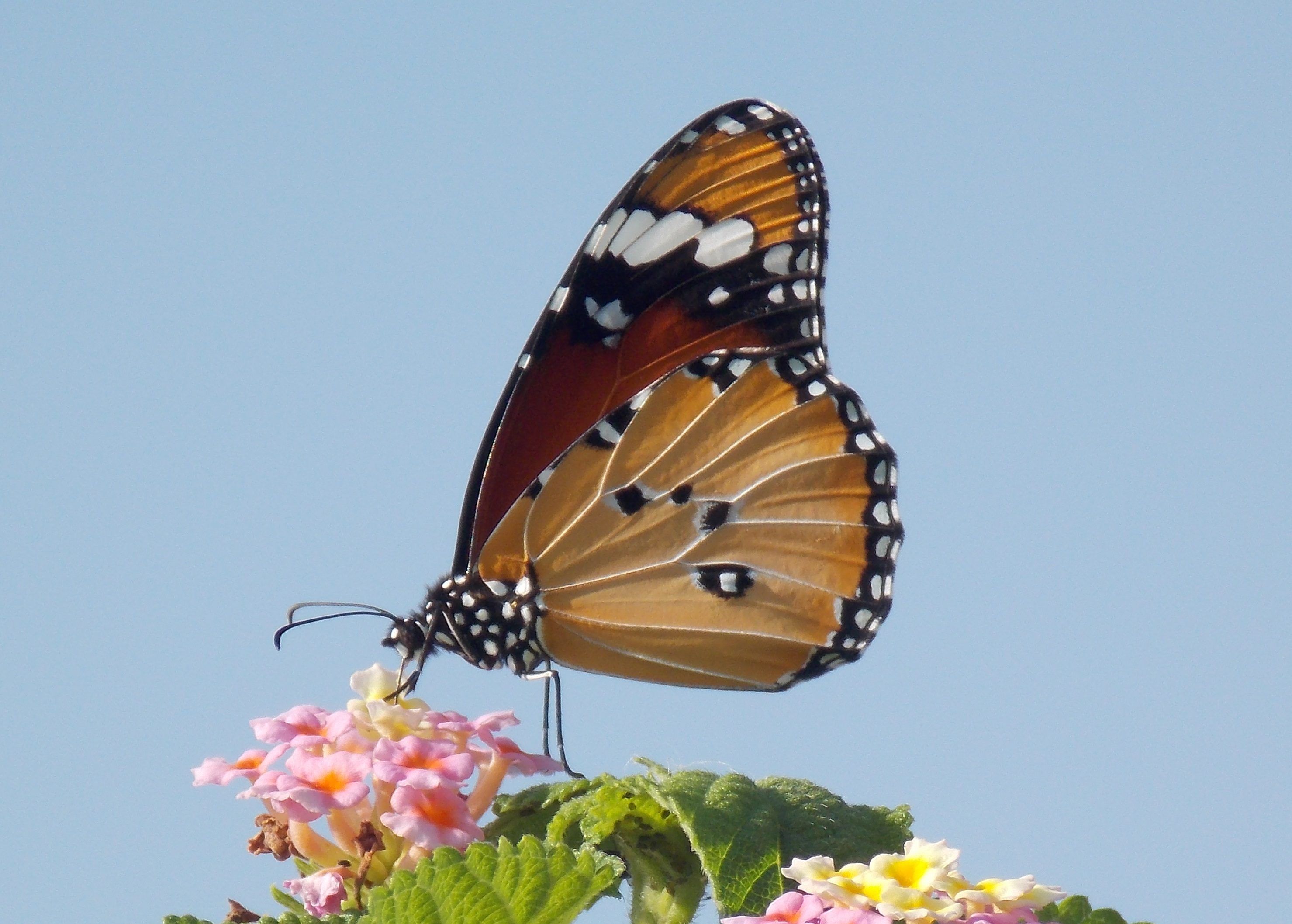
  Danaus chrysippus, Taxila
- Parantica sita (chestnut tiger)
- Euploea core (common crow)
- Euploea mulciber (striped blue crow)

Subfamily: Libytheinae (beaks)

- Libythea celtis (common beak)
- Libythea celtis (European beak or nettle tree butterfly)

Subfamily: Satyrinae (browns)

- Lethe verma (straight-banded tree brown)
- Lethe rohria (common tree brown)
- Lethe confusa (banded tree brown)
- Lasiommata schakra (common wall)
- Lasiommata maerula (Kashmir wall or scarce wall)
- Lasiommata ananda (Chitral wall)
- Lasiommata menava (dark wall)
- Kirinia eversmanni (yellow wall)
- Hyponephele pulchra (dusky meadow brown or beautiful meadow brown)
- Hyponephele pulchella (tawny meadow brown)
- Hyponephele carbonelli (Baltistan meadowbrown)
- Hyponephele narica (tawny branded meadow brown)
- Hyponephele lupina (Branded meadow brown or Oriental meadow brown)
- Hyponephele davendra (white-ringed meadow brown)
- Hyponephele tenuistigma (lesser white-ringed meadow brown)
- Maniola mandane (oval spot meadow brown)
- Hyponephele hilaris (Pamir meadow brown)
- Coenonympha myops subspecies macmahoni (Balochi heath)
- Hipparchia parisatis (white-edged rock brown)
- Eumenis thelephassa (Baluchi rock brown)
- Hipparchia persephone subspecies enervata (dark rock brown)
- Chazara heydenreichi subspecies shandura (Shandur rock brown)
- Chazara enervata
- Pseudochazara mniszechii subspecies gilgitica (tawny rock brown) synonym: Eumenis baldiva
- Pseudochazara annieae (Annie's rockbrown)
- Satyrus pimpla (dark or black satyr)
- Karanasa bolorica (Turkestan satyr)
- Karanasa leechi subspecies hunza (Leech's satyr)
- Karanasa digna (Chitrali satyr) synonym: Kanetisa digna
- Karanasa pupilata (Chitral satyr)
- Karanasa modesta (modest satyr)
- Karanasa astorica (Astor satyr)
- Karanasa huebneri (tawny satyr)
- Karanasa safeda (Safed Koh satyr)
- Karanasa cadesia (Moore's satyr)
- Hipparchia moorei (Turkestan satyr or Shandur satyr)
- Aulocera padma (great satyr)
- Aulocera swaha (common satyr)
- Aulocera saraswati (striated satyr)
- Callerebia nirmala (common argus)
- Callerebia annada (ringed argus)
- Callerebia scanda subspecies caeca (ringed argus)
- Callerebia kalinda (scarce mountain argus)
- Callerebia shallada (mountain argus)
- Paralasa mani (yellow argus) synonym: Erebia mani
- Ypthima inica (lesser threering)
- Ypthima nareda (large threering)
- Ypthima asterope (common threering or African ringlet)
- Ypthima huebneri (common fourring)
- Ypthima bolanica (desert fourring)
- Ypthima lisandra (jewel fourring) or Ypthima avanta
- Ypthima baldus (common fivering)
- Ypthima nikaea (Moore's fivering or West Himalayan five-ring) formerly Ypthima sakra (Himalayan fivering)
- Melanitis leda (common evening brown)
- Mycalesis perseus (common bush brown)
- Mycalesis nicotia (bright-eyed bush brown)

== Family Lycaenidae (gossamer-winged butterflies) ==
Subfamily: Polyommatinae (blues)

- Talicada nyseus (red Pierrot)
- Castalius rosimon (common Pierrot)
- Tarucus balkanicus nigra (Balkan Pierrot or little tiger blue)
- Tarucus nara synonym: Tarucus extricatus (striped or rounded Pierrot)
- Tarucus indicus (Indian Pierrot)
- Tarucus rosacea or Tarucus mediterraneae (Balochistan Pierrot or Mediterranean Pierrot)
- Tarucus callinara (spotted Pierrot)
- Tarucus venosus (Himalayan Pierrot or veined Pierrot)
- Tarucus hazara (Hazara Pierrot)
- Leptotes plinius (zebra blue)
- Azanus jesous (African babul blue or topaz-spotted blue)
- Azanus ubaldus (bright babul blue or desert babul blue-or-velvet-spotted blue)
- Azanus uranus (dull babul blue or Indian babul blue)
- Cupido buddhista (Shandur Cupid or Buddhist blue)
- Cupido argiades diporides (Himalayan Cupid or Chapman's Cupid)
- Cupido argiades indica (short-tailed blue or tailed Cupid)
- Cupido huegelii (dusky-blue Cupid)
- Celastrina huegeli (large hedge blue)
- Celastrina ladonides or Celastrina gigas? (silvery hedge blue)
- Celastrina argiolus subspecies kollari (holly blue or hill hedge blue)
- Acytolepis puspa (common hedge blue)
- Oreolyce vardhana (dusky hedge blue)
- Pseudophilotes vicrama (lesser chequered blue or eastern baton blue)
- Aricia agestis subspecies nazira (brown argus)
- Eumedonia astorica (Astor argus)
- Eumedonia eumedon (streaked argus or geranium argus)
- Plebejus kwaja (dark jewel blue)
- Plebejus christophe (small jewel blue)
- Kretania beani (Balochi jewel blue or zephyr blue)
- Turanana cytis subspecies laspura (spotted argus blue)
- Turanana chitrali (Chitral argus blue)
- Agriades pheretiades (Tien Shan blue)
- Agriades jaloka (greenish mountain blue or Jaloka mountain blue)
- Agriades asiatica (azure mountain blue)
- Afarsia iris (jewel argus)
- Afarsia sieversii felicia (pale jewel blue)
- Pamiria omphisa (dusky green underwing)
- Glaucopsyche alexis (western green underwing or green-underside blue)
- Iolana gigantea subspecies gilgitica (Gilgit mountain blue)
- Plebejidea loewii (large jewel blue)
- Alpherakya sarta (brilliant meadow blue)
- Alpherakya devanica (dusky meadow blue)
- Polyommatus bogra (Balochi meadow blue)
- Polyommatus icarus (common blue or violet meadow blue)
- Polyommatus eros (common meadow blue)
- Polyommatus florenciae (silvery meadow blue)
- Chilades lajus (lime blue)
- Luthrodes contracta (small Cupid)
- Luthrodes pandava (plains Cupid or cycad blue)
- Freyeria trochylus (southern grass jewel)
- Pseudozizeeria maha (pale grass blue)
- Zizeeria karsandra (dark grass blue)
- Lachides galba subspecies phiala (small desert blue or Persian grass blue)
- Zizina otis (lesser grass blue)
- Zizula hylax or Zizula gaika (tiny grass blue or Gaika blue)
- Euchrysops cnejus (gram blue or spotted pea blue)
- Catochrysops strabo (forget-me-not)
- Lampides boeticus (pea blue or long-tailed pea blue)
- Jamides celeno (common cerulean)
- Jamides bochus (dark cerulean)
- Prosotas nora (common lineblue or Nora lineblue or long-tailed lineblue)
- Prosotas dubiosa (tailless lineblue or small purple lineblue)

Subfamily: Lycaeninae (coppers and sapphires)

- Lycaena metallica (small green underwing)
- Lycaena galathea (large green underwing)
- Lycaena pavana (white-bordered copper)
- Lycaena phlaeas (small copper or common copper)
- Lycaena kasyapa (green copper)
- Lycaena solskyi subspecies aditya (golden copper)
- Lycaena caspius (purple copper)
- Lycaena phoenicurus (Baluchi copper)
- Lycaena lampon (Persian fiery copper)
- Heliophorus sena (sorrel sapphire)
- Heliophorus bakeri (western blue sapphire)
- Heliophorus tamu (powdery green sapphire)

Subfamily: Theclinae (hairstreaks and allies)

- Neolycaena connae (Baluchi hairstreak)
- Callophrys rubi (green hairstreak)
- Superflua sassanides (whiteline hairstreak)
- Euaspa milionia (water hairstreak)
- Thecla ziha (white-spotted hairstreak)
- Chrysozephyrus ataxus (wonderful hairstreak)
- Chrysozephyrus syla (silver hairstreak)
- Chaetoprocta odata (walnut blue)
- Arhopala dodonaea (pale Himalayan oakblue)
- Amblypodia rama (dark Himalayan oakblue)
- Arhopala alemon (Indian oakblue)
- Panchala ganesa (tailless bushblue or tailless oakblue)
- Surendra quercetorum (common acacia blue)
- Tajuria cippus (peacock royal)
- Tajuria jehana (plains blue royal)
- Pratapa icetas (dark blue royal)
- Iraota timoleon (silverstreak blue)
- Deudorix epijarbas (cornelian)
- Virachola isocrates (common guava blue)
- Horaga onyx (common onyx)
- Horaga albimacula (violet onyx)
- Rapala manea (slate flash)
- Rapala iarbus (common red flash)
- Rapala nissa (common flash)
- Rapala extensa (Chitral flash)
- Baspa melampus (Indian red flash)
- Bidaspa selira (Himalayan red flash)
- Tomares callimachus (red copper)

Subfamily: Aphnaeinae

- Cigaritis epargyros (yellow silverline)
- Cigaritis acamas (tawny silverline or Arab leopard)
- Cigaritis vulcanus (common silverline)
- Cigaritis ictis (common shot silverline)
- Cigaritis elima (scarce shot silverline)

== Family Riodinidae (metalmarks) ==
Subfamily: Nemeobiinae (punches)

- Dodona durga (common punch)
- Dodona dipoea (lesser punch)
- Dodona eugenes (tailed punch)

== Family Hesperiidae (skippers) ==
Subfamily: Coeliadinae (awls)

- Bibasis sena (orangetail awl or pale-green awlet)
- Hasora chromus (common banded awl)
- Badamia exclamationis (brown awl)
- Choaspes xanthopogon (similar awlking or Indian awlking)

Subfamily: Pyrginae (spread-winged skippers: flats and angles)

- Celaenorrhinus leucocera (common spotted flat)
- Celaenorrhinus munda (Himalayan spotted flat)
- Celaenorrhinus ratna (multispotted flat)
- Sarangesa purendra subspecies pandra (spotted small flat)
- Seseria dohertyi (contiguous seseria or Himalayan white flat)
- Lobocla liliana (marbled flat)
- Tagiades cohaerens subspecies cynthia (Evans's snow flat)
- Caprona agama (spotted angle)
- Caprona alida (yellow-spotted or Alida angle)

Subfamily: Hesperinae (grass skippers: swifts and darts etc.)

- Gomalia elma (marbled skipper or African mallow skipper)
- Spialia galba (Indian skipper or Indian grizzled skipper)
- Spialia sertorius = Syrichtus orbifer carnea (red-underwing skipper or brick skipper)
- Spialia phlomidis (Persian skipper or Balochi skipper)
- Spialia geron = Spialia doris evanida (Aden skipper)
- Muschampia staudingeri (Syrian skipper or streaked skipper)
- Hesperia alpina subspecies alichurensis (mountain skipper)
- Pyrgus cashmirensis (Kashmir skipper)
- Carcharodus altheae (tufted marbled skipper)
- Carcharodus alceae (plain marbled skipper or mallow skipper)
- Nisoniades marloyi (marloyi)
- Erynnis pathan (Chitral inky skipper) [synonym: Nisoniades marloyi ?]
- Aeromachus stigmata (veined scrub hopper)
- Suastus gremius (palm bob)
- Notocrypta feisthamelii (spotted demon)
- Halpe homolea (Indian/Ceylon ace)
- Actinor radians (veined dart)
- Taractrocera danna (Himalayan grass dart)
- Taractrocera maevius (common or Oriental grass dart)
- Potanthus dara (Himalayan dart)
- Telicota bambusae (dark palm dart)
- Telicota colon (pale palm dart or pale-orange darter)
- Pamphila comma (chequered darter or silver-spotted skipper)
- Polytremis eltola (yellow spot swift)
- Polytremis discreta (white-fringed swift or Himalayan swift)
- Pelopidas mathias (dark small-branded swift, small branded swift, lesser millet skipper or black branded swift or rice skipper)
- Pelopidas agna (obscure branded or dark branded swift)
- Pelopidas thrax (white-branded swift)
- Parnara guttata (common straight swift)
- Pseudoborbo bevani (Bevan's swift or lesser rice swift)
- Gegenes nostrodamus (dingy swift, light pygmy skipper or Mediterranean skipper)
- Gegenes pumilio (pygmy swift or pygmy skipper or dark Hottentot)
- Eogenes alcides (alcides skipper or torpedo)
- Eogenes lesliei (Leslie's hopper)
