= List of butterflies of Uttarakhand =

This article lists the butterfly species found in Uttarakhand.

== History of studies on butterflies in Uttarakhand ==
In 1886, William Doherty published a list of 271 species of butterflies from Kumaon. 13 years later, Philip Mackinnon and Lionel de Nicéville published several papers documenting 323 species from Mussoorie and neighboring regions. Between 1910 and 1915, Frank Hannyngton compiled a list of 378 species from the Kumaon region. In 1963, M. L. Roonwal published a list of the identified species of insects in the Forest Research Institute in Dehradun.

== Papilionidae ==
=== Papilioninae ===
- Lesser batwing, Atrophaneura aidoneus
- Common batwing, Atrophaneura astorion
- Common windmill, Byasa polyeuctes letincius
- Great windmill, Byasa dasarada ravana
- Rose windmill, Byasa latreillei latreillei
- Common rose, Pachliopta aristolochiae aristolochiae
- Redbreast, Papilio alcmenor alcmenor
- Western tailed redbreast, Papilio janaka
- Blue peacock, Papilio arcturus arius
- Common peacock, Papilio polyctor
- Paris peacock, Papilio paris paris
- Krishna peacock, Papilio krishna krishna
- Common mormon, Papilio polytes romulus
- Spangle, Papilio protenor protenor
- Red helen, Papilio helenus helenus
- Common yellow swallowtail, Papilio machaon asiatica
- Lime swallowtail, Papilio demoleus demoleus
- Tawny mime, Papilio agestor govindra
- Common mime, Papilio clytia clytia
- Sixbar swordtail, Graphium eurous caschmirensis
- Western spectacle swordtail, Graphium garhwalica
- Spot swordtail, Graphium nomius nomius
- Common jay, Graphium doson axionides
- Tailed jay, Graphium agamemnon agamemnon
- Glassy bluebottle, Graphium cloanthus cloanthus
- Common bluebottle, Graphium sarpedon sarpedon
- Great zebra, Graphium xenocles phrontis
- Brown gorgon, Meandrusa lachinus lachinus
- Golden birdwing, Troides aeacus aeacus

=== Parnassiinae ===
- Regal apollo, Parnassius charltonius
- Common red apollo, Parnassius eahus
- Common blue apollo, Parnassius hardwickii
- Keeled apollo, Parnassius jacquemontii
- Black-edged apollo, Parnassius simo
- Greater banded apollo, Parnassius stenosemus
- Lesser banded apollo, Parnassius stoliczkanus

== Hesperiidae ==
=== Coeliadinae ===
- Brown awl, Badamia exclamationis
- Orange-tailed awlet, Bibasis sena sena
- Plain orange awlet, Burara anadi anadi
- Common orange awlet, Burara jaina jaina
- Branded orange awlet, Burara oedipodea belesis
- Green awlet, Burara vasutana
- Slate awl, Hasora anura
- Common banded awl, Hasora chromus chromus
- Indian awlking, Choaspes benjaminii japonica
- Similar awlking, Choaspes xanthopogon xanthopogon

=== Hesperiinae ===
- Orange-and-silver hopper, Carterocephalus avanti avanti
- Veined scrub hopper, Aeromachus stigmata stigmata
- Forest hopper, Astictopterus jama olivascens
- Tiger hopper, Ampittia subvittatus
- Bush hopper, Ampittia dioscorides dioscorides
- Mussoorie bush bob, Pedesta masuriensis masuriensis
- Indian palm bob, Suastus gremius gremius
- Chestnut bob, Iambrix salsala salsala
- Chocolate demon, Tamela nigrita diocles
- Grass demon, Ancistroides folus
- Restricted demon, Ancistroides curvifascia curvifascia
- Common banded demon, Ancistroides paralysos asawa
- Spotted demon, Ancistroides feisthamelii alysos
- Banana skipper, Erionota torus
- Common redeye, Matapa aria
- Giant redeye, Gangara thyrsis thyrsis
- Tree flitter, Hyarotis adrastus praba
- Purple-and-gold flitter, Zographetus satwa
- Moore's ace, Halpe porus
- Chequered ace, Sovia separata separata
- Graham's ace, Sovia grahami grahami
- Garhwal ace, Thoressa aina
- Olive ace, Pedesta gupta gupta
- Veined dart, Actinor radians
- Ceylon dartlet, Oriens goloides
- Himalayan dart, Potanthus dara
- Sikkim dart, Potanthus mara mara
- Pale dart, Potanthus pallida
- Yellow dart, Potanthus pava pava
- Indian dart, Potanthus pseudomaesa clio
- Himalayan grass dart, Taratrocera danna
- Common grass dart, Taractrocera maevius
- Dark palm dart, Telicota bambusae bambusae
- Common palm dart, Telicota colon colon
- Himalayan darter, Ochlodes brahma brahma
- Assam darter, Ochlodes siva siva
- Chequered darter, Hesperia comma dimila
- Paintbrush swift, Baoris farri
- Figure of eight swift, Baoris pagana
- Bevan's swift, Pseudoborbo bevani
- Rice swift, Borbo cinnara
- Tufted swift, Caltoris plebeia
- Dingy swift, Gegenes nostrodamus
- Oriental straight swift, Parnara bada
- Straight swift, Parnara guttatus mangala
- Great swift, Pelopidas assamensis
- Small-branded swift, Pelopidas mathias mathias
- Obscure-branded swift, Pelopidas agna agna
- Large-branded swift, Pelopidas sinensis
- Conjoined swift, Pelopidas conjuncta conjuncta
- Yellow-spot swift, Zenonoida eltola eltola
- Himalayan swift, Zenonoida discreta discreta
- Contiguous swift, Polytremis lubricans lubricans

=== Pyrginae ===
- Marbled flat, Lobocla liliana ignatius
- Himalayan yellow-banded flat, Celaenorrhinus dhanada
- Common spotted flat, Celaenorrhinus leucocera
- Himalayan spotted flat, Celaenorrhinus munda
- Large-spotted flat, Celaenorrhinus patula
- Mussoorie spotted flat, Celaenorrhinus pero pero
- Multi-spotted flat, Celaenorrhinus pulomaya pulomaya
- Double-spotted flat, Celaenorrhinus pyrrha
- Tytler's multi-spotted flat, Celaenorrhinus ratna daphne
- Moore's spotted flat, Celaenorrhinus sumitra
- West Himalayan pied flat, Pseudocoladenia fatih
- Common small flat, Sarangesa dasahara
- Spotted small flat, Sarangesa purendra purendra
- Himalayan white flat, Seseria dohertyi dohertyi
- Sikkim white flat, Seseria sambara sambara
- Dusky yellow-breast flat, Gerosis phisara phisara
- Common snow flat, Tagiades japetus ravi
- Water snow flat, Tagiades litigiosa litigiosa
- Spotted snow flat, Tagiades menaka menaka
- Striped snow flat, Tagiades cohaerens cynthia
- Yellow flat, Mooreana trichoneura pralaya
- Tricolor pied flat, Coladenia indrani indrani
- Spotted angle, Abaratha agama agama
- Alida angle, Abaratha alida yerburi
- Golden angle, Abaratha ransonnetii potiphera
- Tawny angle, Tapena vasava vasava
- Hairy angle, Darpa hanria
- Chestnut angle, Abaratha angulata angulata
- Kashmir skipper, Pyrgus cashmirensis cashmirensis
- Plain marbled skipper, Carcharodus alceae gooraisa
- Indian skipper, Spialia galba galba

== Pieridae ==
=== Coliadinae ===
- Lemon emigrant, Catopsilia pomona pomona
- Mottled emigrant, Catopsilia pyranthe pyranthe
- Fiery clouded yellow, Colias eogene eogene
- Pale clouded yellow, Colias erate
- Dark clouded yellow, Colias fieldii fieldii
- Ladakh clouded yellow, Colias ladakensis
- One-spot grass yellow, Eurema andersonii jordani
- Three-spot grass yellow, Eurema blanda silhetana
- Small grass yellow, Eurema drona rubella
- Common grass yellow, Eurema hecabe hecabe
- Spotless grass yellow, Eurema laeta laeta
- Tree yellow, Gandaca harina assamica
- Lesser brimstone, Gonepteryx mahaguru mahaguru
- Himalayan brimstone, Gonepteryx nepalensis

=== Pierinae ===
- Great blackvein, Aporia agathon
  - Aporia agathon phryxe
  - Aporia agathon caphusa
- Himalayan blackvein, Aporia soracta
- Dusky blackvein, Aporia nabellica nabellica
- Thibet balckvein, Aporia peloria peloria
- Common albatross, Appias albina darada
- Spot puffin, Appias lalage lalage
- Chocolate albatross, Appias lyncida eleonora
- Western striped albatross, Appias libythea
- Pioneer, Belenois aurota aurota
- Red-breast jezabel, Delias acalis pyramus
- Hill jezabel, Delias belladonna horsfieldii
- Dark jezabel, Delias berinda bolyeae
- Pale jezabel, Delias sanaca sanaca
- Common jezabel, Delias eucharis
- Painted jezabel, Delias hyparete indica
- Psyche, Leptosia nina nina
- Spotted sawtooth, Prioneris thestylis thestylis
- Butler's white, Pontia butleri butleri
- Lofty bath white, Pontia callidice kallora
- Lesser bath white, Pontia chloridice
- Greater bath white, Pontia edusa moorei
- Desert bath white, Pontia glauconome iranica
- Little white, Euchloe daphalis
- Large cabbage white, Pieris brassicae nepalensis
- Indian cabbage white, Pieris canidia indica
- Himalayan white, Pieris ajaka
- Common gull, Cepora nerissa phryne
- Yellow orange tip, Ixias pyrene evippe
- White orange tip, Ixias marianne
- Indian wanderer, Pareronia anais

== Riodinidae ==
=== Riodininae ===
- Common punch, Dodona durga durga
- Lesser punch, Dodona dipoea nostia
- Tailed punch, Dodona eugenes eugenes
- Orange punch, Dodona egeon egeon
- Mixed punch, Dodona ouida phlegra
- Double-banded judy, Abisara bifasciata suffusa
- Dark judy, Spitosa fylla
- Punchinello, Zemeros flegyas flegyas

== Lycaenidae ==
=== Curetinae ===
- Bright sunbeam, Curetis bulis bulis
- Angled sunbeam, Curetis acuta dentata

=== Lycaeninae ===
- Golden sapphire, Heliophorus brahma brahma
- Purple sapphire, Heliophorus epicles latilimbata
- Eastern blue sapphire, Heliophorus oda
- Azure sapphire, Heliophorus moorei coruscans
- Powdery green sapphire, Heliophorus tamu tamu
- Sorrel sapphire, Heliophorus sena
- Green copper, Lycaena kasyapa
- Common copper, Lycaena phlaeas baralacha
- White-bordered copper, Lycaena pavana

=== Miletinae ===
- Common brownie, Miletus chinensis assamensis
- Great darkie, Allotinus drumila drumila
- Apefly, Spalgis epius epius

=== Polyommatinae ===
- Ciliate blue, Anthene emolus emolus
- Common hedge blue, Acytolepis puspa gisca
- Holly blue, Celastrina argiolus kollari
- Silvery hedge blue, Celastrina gigas
- Large hedge blue, Celastrina huegelii huegelii
- Plain hedge blue, Celastrina lavendularis limbata
- Margined hedge blue, Celatoxia marginata marginata
- Dusky hedge blue, Oreolyce vardhana vardhana
- Pale hedge blue, Udara dilectus dilectus
- Albocerulean, Udara albocaerulea albocaerulea
- African babul blue, Azanus jesous gabra
- Bright babul blue, Azanus ubaldus
- Dull babul blue, Azanus uranus
- Angled pierrot, Caleta decidia
- Common pierrot, Castalius rosimon rosimon
- Banded blue pierrot, Discolampa ethion ethion
- Red pierrot, Talicada nyseus nyseus
- Black-spotted pierrot, Tarucus balkanica nigra
- Spotted pierrot, Tarucus callinara
- Hazara pierrot, Tarucus hazara
- Indian pierrot, Tarucus indica
- Striped pierrot, Tarucus nara
- Himalayan pierrot, Tarucus venosus
- Forget-me-not, Catochrysops strabo strabo
- Tailed cupid, Cupido diporides
- Dusky-blue cupid, Cupido huegelii
  - Cupido huegelii dipora
  - Cupido huegelii huegelli
- Indian cupid, Cupido lacturnus assamica
- Gram blue, Euchrysops cnejus cnejus
- Lime blue, Chilades lajus lajus
- Plains cupid, Luthrodes pandava pandava
- Dark cerulean, Jamides bochus bochus
- Common cerulean, Jamides celeno celeno
- Pea blue, Lampides boeticus boeticus
- Zebra blue, Leptotes plinius plinius
- Transparent six-lineblue, Nacaduba kurava
- Barred lineblue, Prosotas aluta coelestis
- Common lineblue, Prosotas nora ardates
- White-tipped lineblue, Prosotas noreia hampsonii
- Tailless lineblue, Prosotas dubiosa indica
- Dingy lineblue, Petrelaea dana
- Grass jewel, Freyeria trochylus orientalis
- Small grass jewel, Freyeria putli
- Pale grass blue, Pseudozizeeria maha maha
- Dark grass blue, Zizeeria karsandra
- Lesser grass blue, Zizina otis otis
- Tiny grass blue, Zizula hylax hylax
- Malayan, Megisba malaya sikkima
- Quaker, Neopithecops zalmora zalmora
- Himalayan meadow blue, Polyommatus stoliczkana stolickzana
- Kumaon meadow blue, Polyommatus dux
- Orange-bordered argus blue, Aricia agestis nazira
- Common mountain blue, Agriades lehanus
- Large green underwing, Pamiria galathea galathea
- Pamir meadow blue, Plebejus eversmanni eversmanni

=== Poritinae ===
- Common gem, Poritia hewitsoni hewitsoni

=== Theclinae ===
- Large oakblue, Arhopala amantes amantrix
- Indian oakblue, Arhopala atrax
- Powdered oakblue, Arhopala bazalus teesta
- Centaur oakblue, Arhopala centaurus pirithous
- Pale Himalayan oakblue, Arhopala dodonaea
- Tailless oakblue, Arhopala ganesa ganesa
- Hewitson's dull oakblue, Arhopala oenea
- Dusky bushblue, Arhopala paraganesa paraganesa
- Dark Himalayan oakblue, Arhopala rama rama
- Yellowdisc oakblue, Arhopala singla
- Aberrant bushblue, Flos abseus
- Variegated plushblue, Flos adriana
- Spangled plushblue, Flos asoka
- Walnut blue, Chaetoprocta odata peilei
- Nepal walnut blue, Chaetoprocta kurumi baileyi
- Fawn hairstreak, Shirozuozephyrus birupa
- Kumaon hairstreak, Shirozuozephyrus triloka
- Silver hairstreak, Inomataozephyrus syla syla
- Dull green hairstreak, Esakiozephyrus icana
- Indian purple hairstreak, Iwaseozephyrus mandara
- Water hairstreak, Euaspa milionia milionia
- White-spotted hairstreak, Shizuyaozephyrus ziha
- Lister's hairstreak, Pamela dudgeonii
- Moore's hairstreak, Satyrium deria
- Wonderful hairstreak, Thermozephyrus ataxus ataxus
- Common tinsel, Catapaecilma major major
- Common imperial, Cheritra freja evansi
- Blue imperial, Ticherra acte acte
- Blue tit, Hypolycaena kina kina
- Orchid tit, Hypolycaena othona othona
- Cornelian, Deudorix epijarbas epijarbas
- Common onyx, Horaga onyx onyx
- Violet onyx, Horaga albimacula viola
- Silverstreak blue, Iraota timoleon timoleon
- Yamfly, Loxura atymnus continentalis
- White-tufted royal, Pratapa deva lila
- Dark blue royal, Pratapa icetas icetas
- Peacock royal, Tajuria cippus cippus
- Straightline royal, Tajuria diaeus diaeus
- White royal, Tajuria illurgis illurgis
- Scarce white royal, Tajuria illurgioides
- Plains blue royal, Tajuria jehana jehana
- Branded royal, Tajuria melastigma
- Chestnut-and-black royal, Tajuria yajna yajna
- Bi-spot royal, Ancema ctesia ctesia
- Broad-tailed royal, Creon cleobis cleobis
- Common red flash, Rapala iarbus sorya
- Slate flash, Rapala manea schistacea
- Common flash, Rapala nissa nissa
- Copper flash, Rapala pheretima petosiris
- Himalayan red flash, Rapala selira
- Assam flash, Rapala tara
- Indigo flash, Rapala varuna orseis
- Broad spark, Sinthusa chandrana chandrana
- Narrow spak, Sinthusa nasaka pallidior
- Lilac silverline, Cigaritis lilacinus
- Elwes' silverline, Cigaritis elwesi
- Common shot silverline, Cigaritis ictis ictis
- Scarce shot silverline, Cigaritis elima uniformis
- Long-branded silverline, Cigaritis lohita himalayanus
- Silver-grey silverline, Cigaritis nipalicus
- Common silverline, Cigaritis vulcanus vulcanus
- Common acacia blue, Surendra quercetorum quercetorum
- Common guava blue, Virachola isocrates
- Large guava blue, Virachola perse perse
- Redspot, Zesius chrysomallus

== Nymphalidae ==
=== Apaturinae ===
- Sordid emperor, Chitoria sordida sordida
- Golden emperor, Dilipa morgiana
- Indian purple emperor, Mimathyma ambica ambica
- Painted courtesan, Euripus consimilis consimilis
- Courtesan, Euripus nyctelius nyctelius
- Circe, Mimathyma nama nama
- Siren, Hestina persimilis
- Scarce siren, Hestina nicevillei nicevillei
- Black prince, Rohana parisatis parisatis
- Western courtier, Sephisa dichroa
- Eastern courtier, Sephisa chandra chandra

=== Biblidinae ===
- Angleed castor, Ariadne ariadne pallidior
- Common castor, Ariadne merione tapestrina

=== Calinaginae ===
- Freak, Calinaga buddha

=== Charaxinae ===
- Anomalous nawab, Polyura agrarius
- Pallid nawab, Polyura arja arja
- Cryptic nawab, Polyura bharata
- Stately nawab, Polyura dolon dolon
- Great nawab, Polyura eudamippus eudamippus
- Tawny rajah, Charaxes bernardus hierax
- Variegated rajah, Charaxes kahruba
- Yellow rajah, Charaxes marmax marmax
- Black rajah, Eriboea solon solon

=== Cyrestinae ===
- Common maplet, Chersonesia risa risa
- Common map, Cyrestis thyodamas ganescha

=== Danainae ===
- Plain tiger, Danaus chrysippus chrysippus
- Common tiger, Danaus genutia genutia
- Glassy tiger, Parantica aglea melanoides
- Chocolate tiger, Parantica melaneus plataniston
- Chestnut tiger, Parantica sita sita
- Blue tiger, Tirumala limniace exoticus
- Dark blue tiger, Tirumala septentrionis spetentrionis
- Common crow, Euploea core core
- Spotted blue crow, Euploea midamus rogenhoferi
- Striped blue crow, Euploea mulciber mulciber
- Magpie crow, Euploea radamanthus radamanthus
- Double-branded crow, Euploea sylvester

=== Heliconiinae ===
- Yellow coster, Telchinia issoria issoria
- Tawny coster, Acraea terpsicore
- Large silverstreak, Argynnis childreni sakontala
- Silverstreak, Argynnis clara clara
- Indian fritillary, Argynnis hyperbius hyperbius
- Himalayan highbrown silverspot, Argynnis jainadeva jainadeva
- Common silverstripe, Argynnis kamala
- Gem silverspot, Issoria gemmata gemmata
- Brilliant silverspot, Issoria mackinnonii
- Queen of Spain fritilary, Issoria lathonia isaeea
- Straightwing silverspot, Boloria sipora
- Leopard lacewing, Cethosia cyane cyane
- Rustic, Cupha erymanthis lotis
- Common leopard, Phalanta phalantha phalantha
- Vagrant, Vagrans sinha

=== Libytheinae ===
- Common beak, Libythea lepita lepita
- Club beak, Libythea myrrha sanguinalis

=== Limenitidinae ===
- Studded sergeant, Limenitis asura asura
- Indian white admiral, Limenitis trivena pallida
- Orange staff sergeant, Athyma cama cama
- Green commodore, Athyma daraxa daraxa
- Hill sergeant, Athyma opalina opalina
- Common sergeant, Athyma perius perius
- Staff sergeant, Athyma selenophora selenophora
- Small staff sergeant, Athyma zeroca zeroca
- Commodore, Auzakia danava danava
- Commander, Moduza procris procris
- Common sailer, Neptis hylas varmona
- Pallas's sailer, Neptis sappho astola
- Chestnut-streaked sailer, Neptis jumbah
- Creamy sailer, Neptis soma butleri
- Himalayan sailer, Neptis mahendra mahendra
- Variegated sailer, Neptis armandia melba
- Nata sailer, Neptis nata yerburii
- Sullied sailer, Neptis clinia praedicta
- Dingy sailer, Neptis pseudovikasi
- Broad-banded sailer, Neptis sankara sankara
- Plain sailer, Neptis cartica cartica
- Broadstick sailer, Neptis narayana narayana
- Pale hockeystick sailer, Neptis manasa manasa
- Pale green sailer, Neptis zaida zaida
- Yellow sailer, Neptis ananta ananta
- Small yellow sailer, Neptis miah varshneyi
- Great yellow sailer, Neptis radha radha
- Short-banded sailer, Phaedyma columella ophiana
- Common lascar, Pantoporia hordonia hordonia
- Extra lascar, Pantoporia sandaka davidsoni
- Common earl, Tanaecia julii appaides
- Grey count, Tanaecia lepidea lepidea
- Common baron, Euthalia aconthea garuda
- Gaudy baron, Euthalia lubentina lubentina
- Grand duchess, Euthalia patala patala
- Baronet, Euthalia nais

=== Nymphalinae ===
- Blue admiral, Nymphalis canace canace
- Indian tortoiseshell, Nymphalis caschmirensis aesis
- Comma, Nymphalis c-album cognata
- Mountain tortoiseshell, Nymphalis rizana
- Ladakh tortoiseshell, Nymphalis ladakensis
- Large tortoiseshell, Nymphalis xanthomelas fervescens
- Great eggfly, Hypolimnas bolina jacintha
- Danaid eggfly, Hypolimnas misippus
- Peacock pansy, Junonia almana almana
- Grey pansy, Junonia atlites atlites
- Yellow pansy, Junonia hierta hierta
- Chocolate pansy, Junonia iphita iphita
- Lemon pansy, Junonia lemonias lemonias
- Blue pansy, Junonia orithya orithya
- Orange oakleaf, Kallima inachus inachus
- Cryptic oakleaf, Kallima incognita
- Himalayan jester, Symbrenthia brabira brabira
- Spotted jester, Symbrenthia hypselis cotanda
- Common jester, Symbrenthia lilaea khasiana
- Bluetail jester, Symbrenthia niphanda hysudra
- Painted lady, Vanessa cardui cardui
- Indian red admiral, Vanessa indica indica

=== Pseudergolinae ===
- Constable, Dichorragia nesimachus nesimachus
- Tabby, Pseudergolis wedah wedah
- Popinjay, Stibochiona nicea nicea

=== Satyrinae ===
- Narrow-banded satyr, Aulocera brahminus
  - Aulocera brahminus brahminus
  - Aulocera brahminus dokwana
- Great satyr, Aulocera padma padma
- Doherty's satyr, Aulocera loha loha
- Mountain satyr, Aulocera pumilus
- Common satyr, Aulocera swaha swaha
- Striated satyr, Aulocera saraswati saraswati
- Ringed argus, Callerebia ananda caeca
- Hybrid argus, Callerebia hybrida
- Pallid argus, Callerebia scanda scanda
- Common satyr, Callerebia nirmala
- Scarce mountain argus, Paralasa kalinda kalinda
- Mountain argus, Paralasa shallada shallada
- Common palmfly, Elymnias hypermnestra undularis
- Spotted palmfly, Elymnias malelas nilamba
- Blue-striped palmfly, Elymnias patna patna
- Branded meadowbrown, Hyponephele cheena cheena
- White-ringed meadowbrown, Hyponephele davendra davendra
- Tawny meadowbrown, Hyponephele pulchella
- Dusky meadowbrown, Hyponephele pulchra
- White-edged rockbrown, Hipparchia parisatis shiva
- Tibetan satyr, Oeneis buddha garhwalica
- Common wall, Lasiommata schakra schakra
- Scarce wall, Lasiommata maerula maerula
- Small tawny wall, Orinoma moorei moorei
- Tigerbrown, Orinoma damaris damaris
- Treble silverstripe, Lethe baladeva
- Banded treebrown, Lethe confusa confusa
- Bamboo treebrown, Lethe europa niladana
- Common treebrown, Lethe rohria rohria
- Straight-banded treebrown, Lethe verma verma
- Common forester, Lethe hyrania hyrania
- Bamboo forester, Lethe kansa
- Tailed red forester, Lethe sinorix sinorix
- Scarce woodbrown, Lethe siderea siderea
- Common woodbrown, Lethe sidonis
- Garhwal woodbrown, Lethe dakwania
- Yellow woodbrown, Lethe nicetas
- Barred woodbrown, Lethe maitrya maitrya
- Small silverfork, Lethe jalaurida jalaurida
- Large goldenfork, Lethe goalpara goalpara
- Common evening brown, Melanitis leda leda
- Dark evening brown, Melanitis phedima bela
- Great evening brown, Melanitis zitenius zitenius
- Lilacine bushbrown, Mycalesis francisca sanatana
- Dark-brand bushbrown, Mycalesis mineus mineus
- Common bushbrown, Mycalesis perseus blasius
- Wood-Mason's bushbrown, Mycalesis suaveolens ranotei
- Long-brand bushbrown, Mycalesis visala visala
- Veined labyrinth, Neope pulaha pandyia
- Dusky labyrinth, Neope yama buckleyi
- Smooth-eyed bushbrown, Orsotriaena medus medus
- Moore's bushbrown, Telinga heri
- Lepcha bushbrown, Telinga lepcha lepcha
- Bright-eyed bushbrown, Telinga nicotia
- Common threering, Ypthima asterope mahratta
- Large threering, Ypthima nareda
- Newar threering, Ypthima newara newara
- Lesser threering, Ypthima inica
- Common fourring, Ypthima huebneri
- Kashmir fourring, Ypthima kasmira
- Jewel fivering, Ypthima avanta
- Common fivering, Ypthima baldus baldus
- Moore's fivering, Ypthima nikaea
- Himalayan fivering, Ypthima sakra sakra
- Hannyngton's fivering, Ypthima hannyngtoni
- Western fivering, Ypthima indecora
