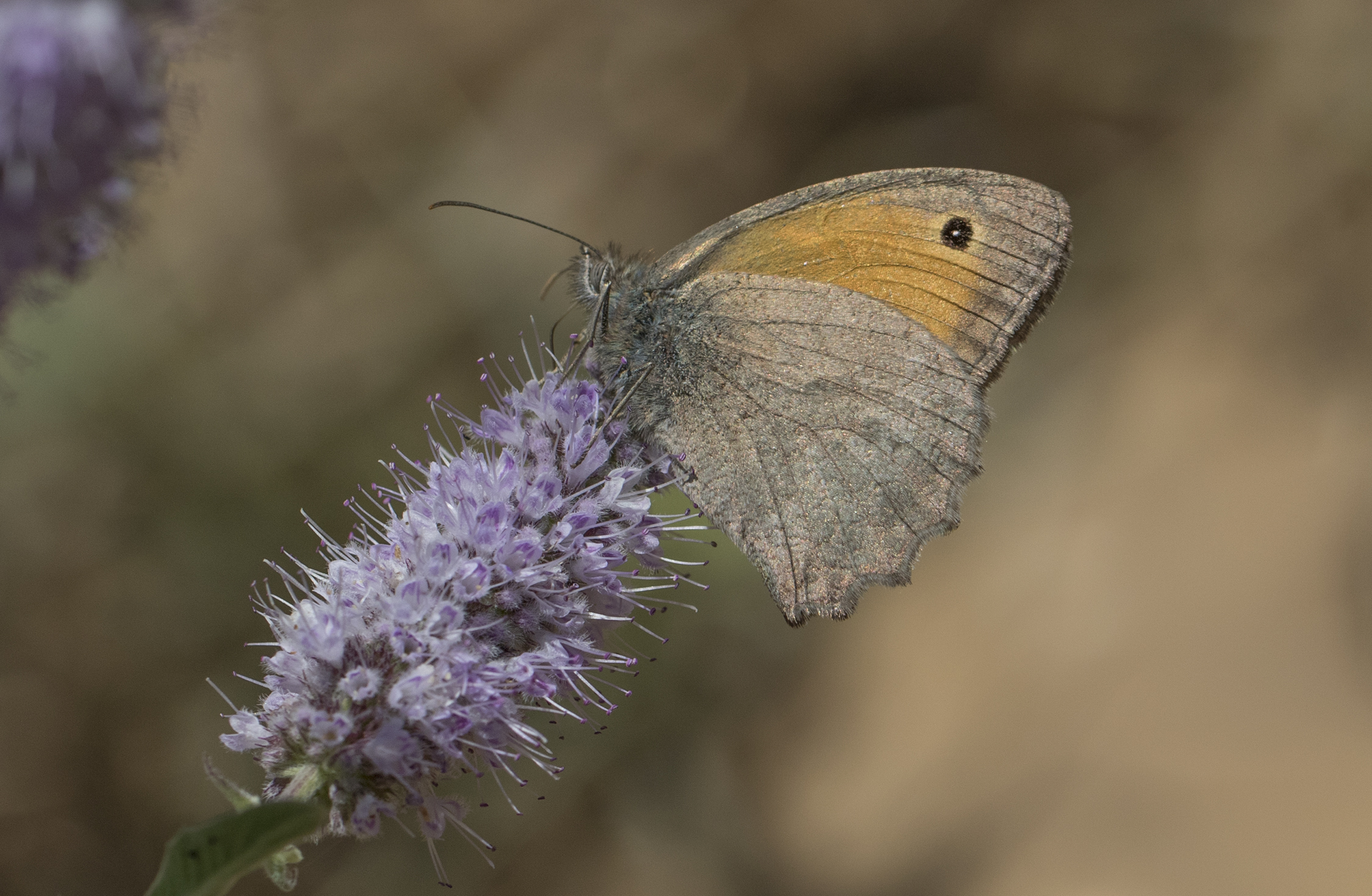
- Hyponephele lupina, Turkey

Scientific classification
- Kingdom: Animalia
- Phylum: Arthropoda
- Clade: Pancrustacea
- Class: Insecta
- Order: Lepidoptera
- Family: Nymphalidae
- Subtribe: Maniolina
- Genus: Hyponephele; Muschamp, 1915

Species
- See text

= Hyponephele =

Genus of butterflies

Hyponephele is a genus of butterflies of the subfamily Satyrinae in the family Nymphalidae. Most range from Europe into central Asia with a few in northern Africa. They are commonly called meadowbrowns.

== Species ==
Listed alphabetically:

- Hyponephele amardaea (Lederer, 1869)
- Hyponephele argyrostigma Tuzov & Samodurow, 1997
- Hyponephele astorica (Tytler, 1926)
- Hyponephele bala Wyatt & Omoto, 1966
- Hyponephele baroghila (Tytler, 1926)
- Hyponephele brevistigma (Moore, 1893)
- Hyponephele cadusia (Lederer, 1869)
- Hyponephele capella (Christoph, 1877)
- Hyponephele carbonelli Lukhtanov, 1995
- Hyponephele cheena (Moore, 1865)
- Hyponephele comara (Lederer, [1870])
- Hyponephele coenonympha (Felder & Felder, 1867)
- Hyponephele davendra (Moore, 1865) – white-ringed meadowbrown
- Hyponephele difficilis Clench & Shoumatoff, 1956
- Hyponephele dysdora (Lederer, 1869)
- Hyponephele dzhungarica Samodurow, 1996
- Hyponephele filistigma Pagès, 2007
- Hyponephele fortambeka Samodurow, 1996
- Hyponephele fusca Stshetkin, 1960
- Hyponephele galtscha (Grum-Grshimailo, 1893)
- Hyponephele germana (Staudinger, 1887)
- Hyponephele glasunovi (Grum-Grshimailo, 1893)
- Hyponephele haberhaueri (Staudinger, 1886)
- Hyponephele hilaris (Staudinger, 1886)
- Hyponephele huebneri Koçak, 1980
- Hyponephele interposita (Erschoff, 1874)
- Hyponephele issykkuli Samodurow, 1996
- Hyponephele jasavi Lukhtanov, 1990
- Hyponephele kaschmirensis Rühl, 1894
- Hyponephele kirghisa (Alphéraky, 1881)
- Hyponephele kocaki Eckweiler, 1978
- Hyponephele korshunovi Lukhtanov, 1994
- Hyponephele kugitanghi Dubatolov & Sergeew
- Hyponephele laeta (Staudinger, 1886)
- Hyponephele lupina (Costa, 1836) – Oriental meadow brown, branded meadowbrown
- Hyponephele lycaon (Kühn, 1774) – dusky meadow brown
- Hyponephele lycaonoides Weiss, 1978
- Hyponephele maroccana (Blachier, 1908) – Moroccan meadow brown
- Hyponephele maureri (Staudinger, 1887)
- Hyponephele murzini Dubatolov, 1989
- Hyponephele mussitans Clench & Shoumatoff, 1956
- Hyponephele naricina (Staudinger, 1870)
- Hyponephele naricoides Gross, 1977
- Hyponephele naubidensis (Erschoff, 1874)
- Hyponephele neoza (Lang, 1868)
- Hyponephele pagmani Churkin, Pljushch & Samodurov, 2011
- Hyponephele pamira Lukhtanov, 1990
- Hyponephele pasimelas (Staudinger, 1886)
- Hyponephele perplexa Wyatt & Omoto, 1966
- Hyponephele prasolovi Lukhtanov, 1990
- Hyponephele przewalskyi Dubatolov, Sergeev & Zhdanko, 1994
- Hyponephele przhewalskyi Dubatolov, Sergeev & Zhdanko, 1994
- Hyponephele pseudokirgisa Shchetkin, 1984
- Hyponephele pseudomussitans Wyatt & Omoto, 1966
- Hyponephele pulchella (C. & R. Felder, [1867])
- Hyponephele pulchra (C. & R. Felder, [1867]) – tawny meadowbrown
- Hyponephele rubriceps (Herz, 1900)
- Hyponephele rueckbeili (Staudinger, 1887)
- Hyponephele sheljuzhkoi Samodurov & Tschikolovez, 1996
- Hyponephele susurrans Clench & Shoumatoff, 1956
- Hyponephele sylvia (Hemming, 1933)
- Hyponephele tenuistigma (Moore, 1893)
- Hyponephele tristis (Grum-Grshimailo, 1893)
- Hyponephele urartua de Freina & Aussem, 1986
- Hyponephele wagneri (Herrich-Schäffer, [1846])
