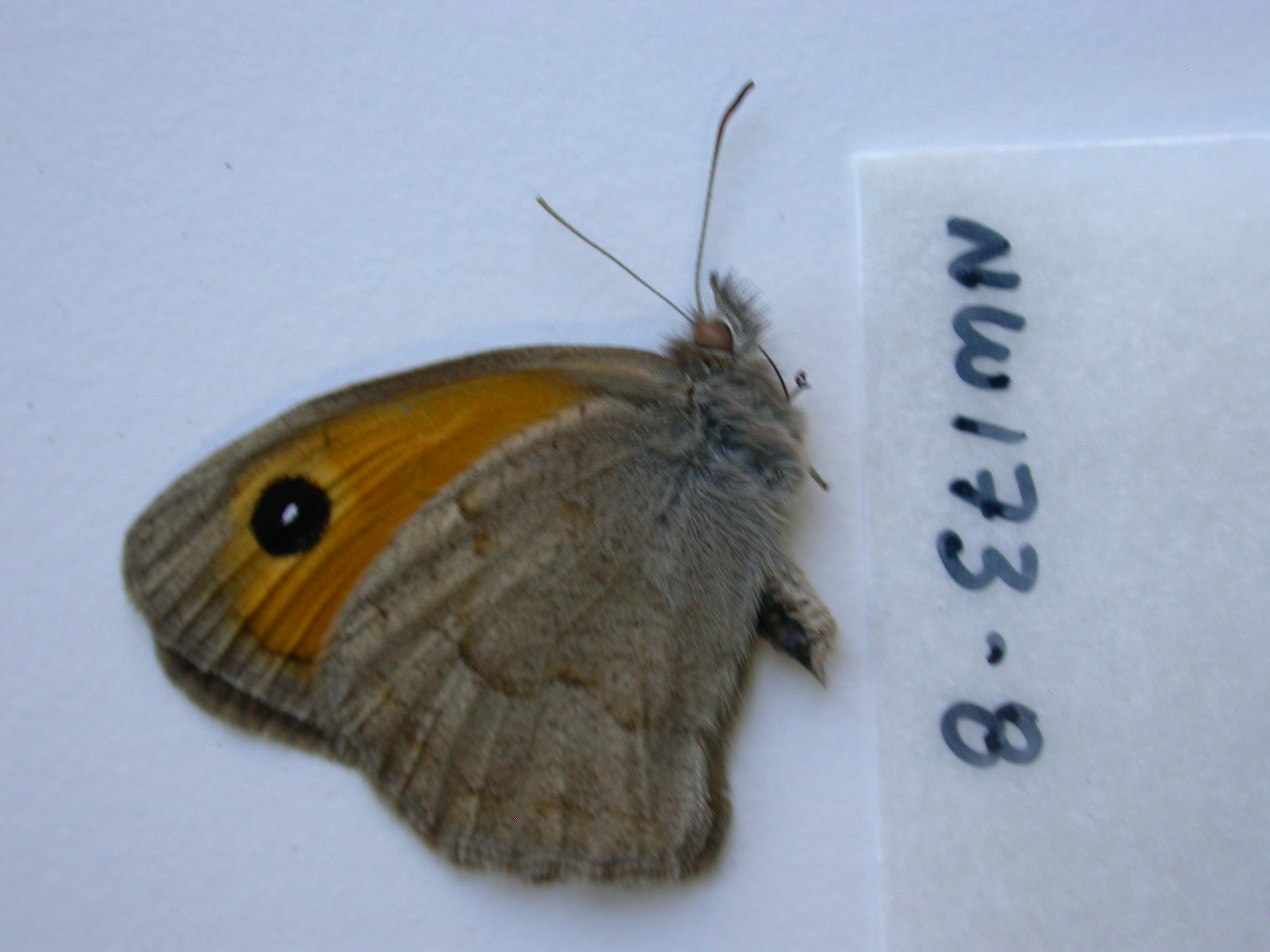

Scientific classification
- Kingdom: Animalia
- Phylum: Arthropoda
- Class: Insecta
- Order: Lepidoptera
- Family: Nymphalidae
- Genus: Hyponephele
- Species: H. maroccana

Binomial name
- Hyponephele maroccana (Blachier, 1908)

Synonyms
- Epinephele lycaon var. maroccana (Blachier, 1908)

= Hyponephele maroccana =

Moroccan meadow brown

Species of butterfly

Hyponephele maroccana, the Moroccan meadow brown, is a butterfly of the family Nymphalidae. It is endemic to Morocco (Atlas Mountains).

== Subspecies ==
- H. m. maroccana (High Atlas)
- H. m. nivellei (Oberthür, 1920) (Middle Atlas)

== Biology ==
It flies in rocky places in one generation from June to August.
