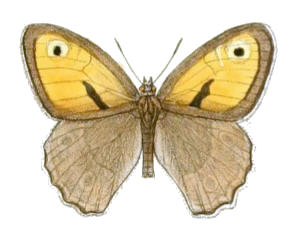

Scientific classification
- Kingdom: Animalia
- Phylum: Arthropoda
- Clade: Pancrustacea
- Class: Insecta
- Order: Lepidoptera
- Family: Nymphalidae
- Genus: Hyponephele
- Species: H. brevistigma

Binomial name
- Hyponephele brevistigma (Moore, 1893)

= Hyponephele brevistigma =

Species of butterfly

Hyponephele brevistigma is a butterfly species belonging to the family Nymphalidae. It can be found in Afghanistan, northern Pakistan, Kashmir, western Pamirs and the southern slope of the Alai Mountains.

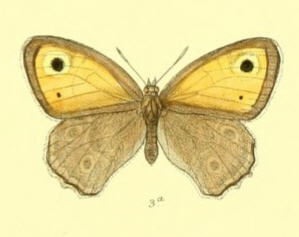

Adults are on wing from June to August.

== Subspecies ==
- Hyponephele brevistigma brevistigma
- Hyponephele brevistigma evanescens (western Pamirs)
- Hyponephele brevistigma alaina (southern slope of the Alaisky mountains)
