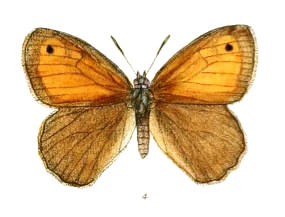

Scientific classification
- Kingdom: Animalia
- Phylum: Arthropoda
- Clade: Pancrustacea
- Class: Insecta
- Order: Lepidoptera
- Family: Nymphalidae
- Genus: Hyponephele
- Species: H. neoza

Binomial name
- Hyponephele neoza (Lang, 1868)

Synonyms
- Chortobius neoza

= Hyponephele neoza =

Species of butterfly

Hyponephele neoza is a butterfly species belonging to the family Nymphalidae. It is found in India.

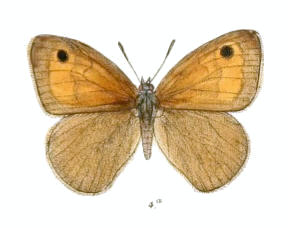
