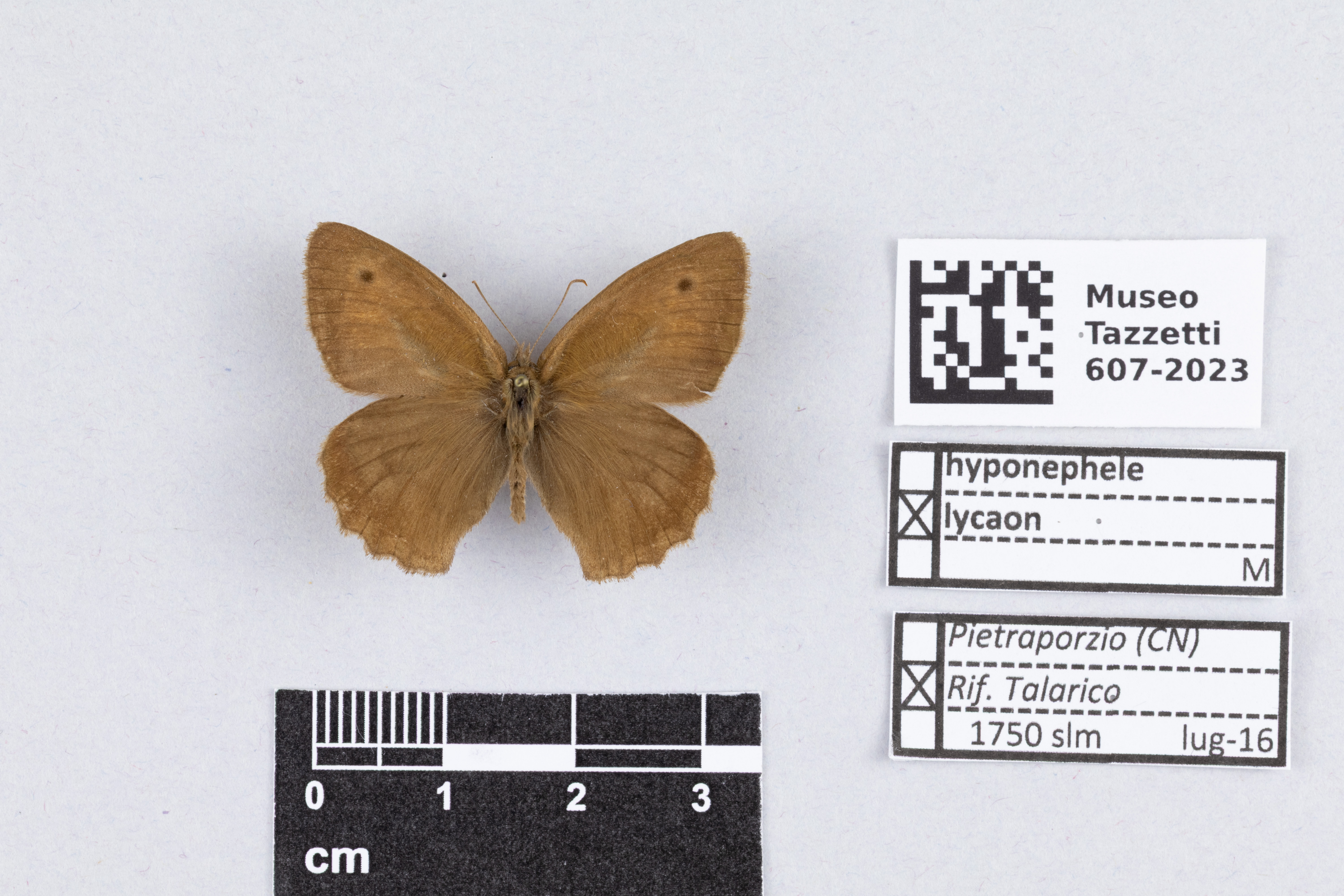
- Hyponephele lycaon specimen

Scientific classification
- Kingdom: Animalia
- Phylum: Arthropoda
- Clade: Pancrustacea
- Class: Insecta
- Order: Lepidoptera
- Family: Nymphalidae
- Genus: Hyponephele
- Species: H. lycaon

Binomial name
- Hyponephele lycaon Rottemburg, 1775

= Hyponephele lycaon =

Species of butterfly

Hyponephele lycaon, the dusky meadow brown, is a butterfly species belonging to the family Nymphalidae. H. lycaon was long confused with the sympatric H. lupina, despite their differences in the male genitalia and androconial patch shape. It is broadly distributed in the temperate zone of the Palearctic from Portugal in the west to the Russian Far East in the east.

The wingspan is about 40 mm. The butterflies fly from June to August depending on the location.

Host plants include grasses (Poaceae) such as Festuca, Bromus and Stipa, on which females lay their eggs singly.
