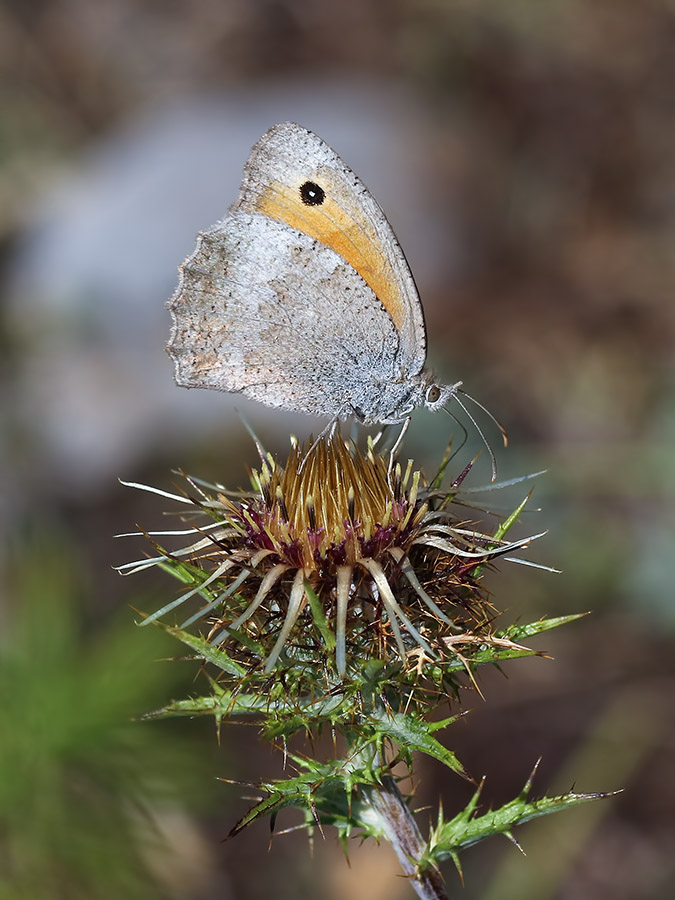

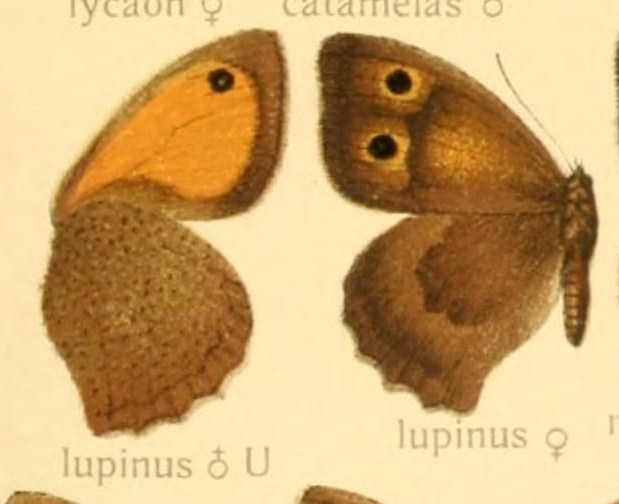
- Underside of female (left) and male (right) from Adalbert Seitz

Scientific classification
- Domain: Eukaryota
- Kingdom: Animalia
- Phylum: Arthropoda
- Class: Insecta
- Order: Lepidoptera
- Family: Nymphalidae
- Genus: Hyponephele
- Species: H. lupina

Binomial name
- Hyponephele lupina (O. Costa, 1836)

Synonyms
- Hyponephele lupinus

= Hyponephele lupina =

Oriental meadow brown

Species of butterfly

Hyponephele lupina, the Oriental meadow brown or branded meadowbrown, is a butterfly of the family Nymphalidae. It is found in North Africa, south western Europe, southern Russia, Asia Minor, southern Siberia, Middle Asia, Iran and from Baluchistan to Nepal.Seitz describes it thus- lupinus Costa (47 e) is rather considerably larger than the forms [of Epinepele] so far named; the rusty yellow on the underside of the forewing is brighter, the underside of the hindwing strongly speckled. Southern Italy, Greece.
