= Rapala extensa =

Scientific classification
- Kingdom: Animalia
- Phylum: Arthropoda
- Clade: Pancrustacea
- Class: Insecta
- Order: Lepidoptera
- Family: Lycaenidae
- Genus: Rapala
- Species: R. extensa

Binomial name
- Rapala extensa Evans, 1926

Synonyms
- Rapala nissa extensa; Rapala micans extensa

Species of butterfly

Rapala extensa, the Chitral flash, is a butterfly in the family Lycaenidae. It is found in Kashmir and Himachal Pradesh. It was described by William Harry Evans in 1926.

== Description ==
The upperside is dark brown, it is lightly glossed with purple. On the hindwing, the red areas are crossed by black veins. It is pale brown on the underside.

It is similar to Rapala selira, but the red area on the upperside is much wider in extensa.
