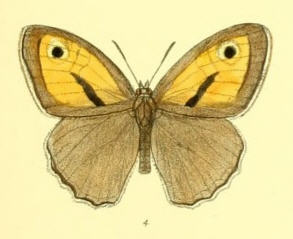

Scientific classification
- Kingdom: Animalia
- Phylum: Arthropoda
- Clade: Pancrustacea
- Class: Insecta
- Order: Lepidoptera
- Family: Nymphalidae
- Genus: Hyponephele
- Species: H. tenuistigma

Binomial name
- Hyponephele tenuistigma (Moore, 1893-96)

Synonyms
- Maniola tenuistigma Moore, 1893-96

= Hyponephele tenuistigma =

Species of butterfly

Hyponephele tenuistigma is a butterfly species belonging to the family Nymphalidae. It is found in Afghanistan, Pakistan, Kashmir and the western part of the Pamir Mountains.

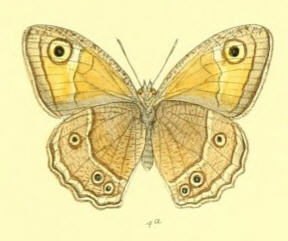
