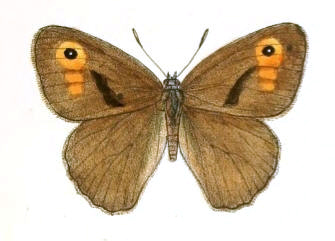
- Hyponephele cheena cheena

Scientific classification
- Kingdom: Animalia
- Phylum: Arthropoda
- Clade: Pancrustacea
- Class: Insecta
- Order: Lepidoptera
- Family: Nymphalidae
- Genus: Hyponephele
- Species: H. cheena

Binomial name
- Hyponephele cheena (Moore, 1865)

Synonyms
- Epinephele cheena Moore, 1865; Maniola cheena Moore, 1865; Maniola lupinus cheena Moore, 1865; Maniola iskander Hemming, 1941; Maniola cheena iskander Hemming, 1941; Maniola kashmirica Moore, 1893-96; Maniola cheena kashmirica Moore, 1893-96

= Hyponephele cheena =

Species of butterfly

Hyponephele cheena is a butterfly species belonging to the family Nymphalidae. It is found in India.

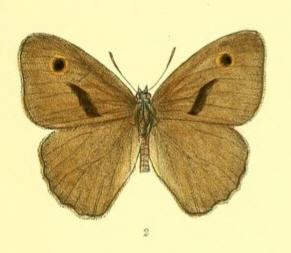
Hyponephele cheena kashmirica

== Subspecies ==
- Hyponephele cheena cheena (Moore, 1865)
- Hyponephele cheena iskander (Hemming, 1941)
- Hyponephele cheena kashmirica (Moore, 1893–96)
