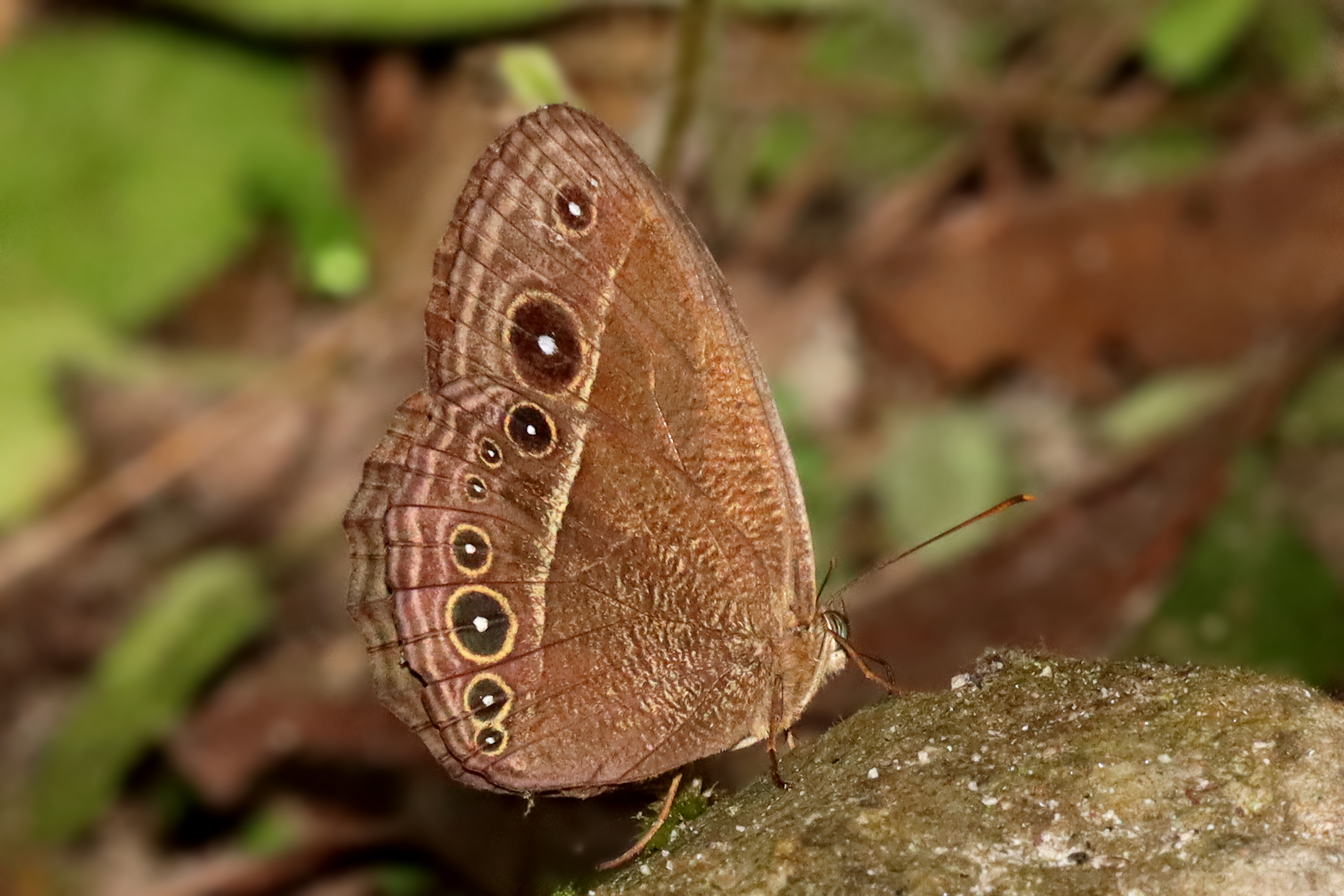

Scientific classification
- Kingdom: Animalia
- Phylum: Arthropoda
- Class: Insecta
- Order: Lepidoptera
- Family: Nymphalidae
- Genus: Telinga
- Species: T. heri

Binomial name
- Telinga heri (Moore, [1858])

Synonyms
- Mycalesis heri (Moore, [1858])

= Telinga heri =

Species of butterfly

Telinga heri, also known as the Moore's bushbrown or the large-eyed bushbrown, is a butterfly in the family Nymphalidae. It is found in the Himalayas in India, Nepal and Bhutan. It was described by Frederic Moore in 1857. This species is monotypic.

== Description ==
The underside of this species is brown, with a prominent yellow discal band across both wings. The area inside of this line is heavily marked. The underside forewing has a single large ocellus, while the hindwing has a series of six smaller ocelli on a smaller curve.

The upperside forewing has a large ocellus, like the underside. The hindwing usually has ocelli in spaces 1,2 and 3. The male has a small black brand and a tuft on the hindwing.

The wingspan of this species is 60-70 mm.

== Habits and habitat ==
This species is recorded between April and November at altitudes of 1000-2000 metres.
