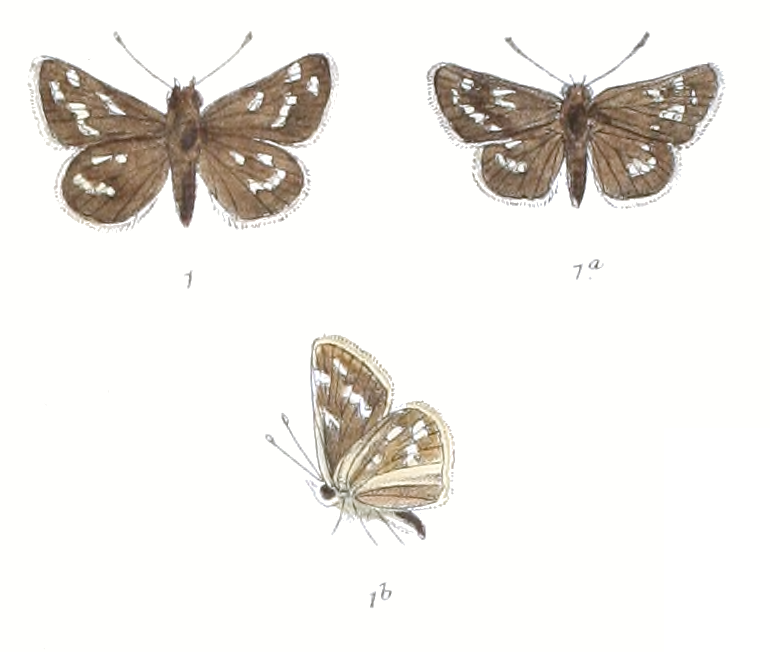
- Tractrocera Danna

Scientific classification
- Kingdom: Animalia
- Phylum: Arthropoda
- Class: Insecta
- Order: Lepidoptera
- Family: Hesperiidae
- Genus: Taractrocera
- Species: T. danna

Binomial name
- Taractrocera danna (Moore, 1865)

Synonyms
- Pamphila danna Moore, 1865

= Taractrocera danna =

Species of butterfly

Taractrocera danna, the Himalayan grass dart, is a butterfly of the family Hesperiidae. It is found in the Himalayas, from Kashmir through Nepal, southern Tibet and Sikkim to Bhutan. In Nepal, it is found on heights between 4,500 and 13,000 feet.
