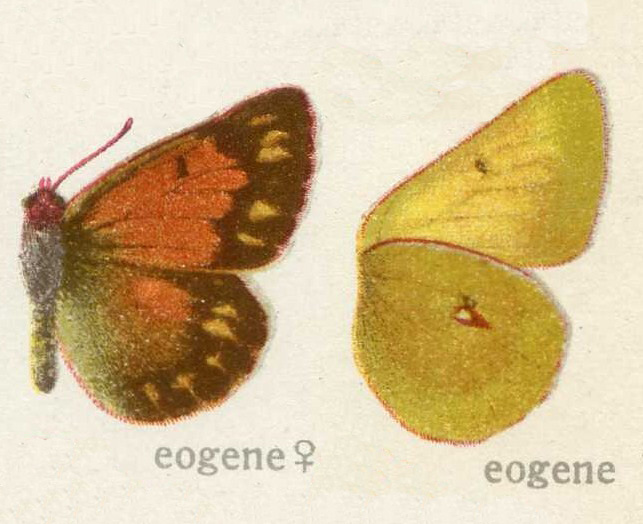

Scientific classification
- Kingdom: Animalia
- Phylum: Arthropoda
- Class: Insecta
- Order: Lepidoptera
- Family: Pieridae
- Genus: Colias
- Species: C. eogene

Binomial name
- Colias eogene C. Felder, 1865

= Colias eogene =

Fiery clouded yellow

Species of butterfly

Colias eogene, the fiery clouded yellow, is a small butterfly of the family Pieridae, that is, the yellows and whites, which is found in India.

== See also ==
- List of butterflies of India
- List of butterflies of India (Pieridae)
