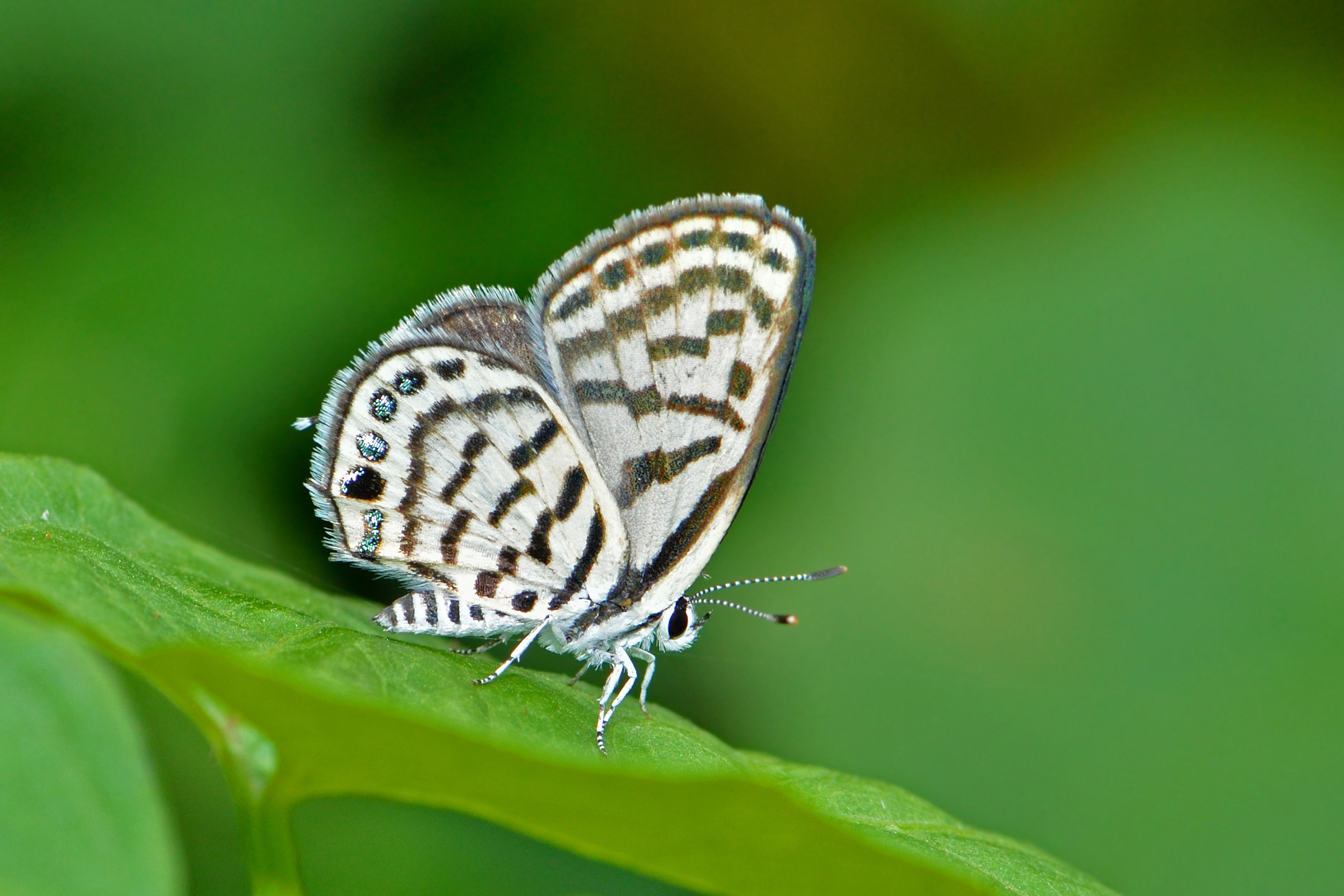

Scientific classification
- Domain: Eukaryota
- Kingdom: Animalia
- Phylum: Arthropoda
- Class: Insecta
- Order: Lepidoptera
- Family: Lycaenidae
- Genus: Tarucus
- Species: T. venosus

Binomial name
- Tarucus venosus Moore, 1882

= Tarucus venosus =

Himalayan Pierrot

Species of butterfly

Tarucus venosus, the Himalayan Pierrot or veined Pierrot, is a small butterfly found in India that belongs to the lycaenids or blues family. The species was first described by Frederic Moore in 1882.

== See also ==
- List of butterflies of India
- List of butterflies of India (Lycaenidae)
