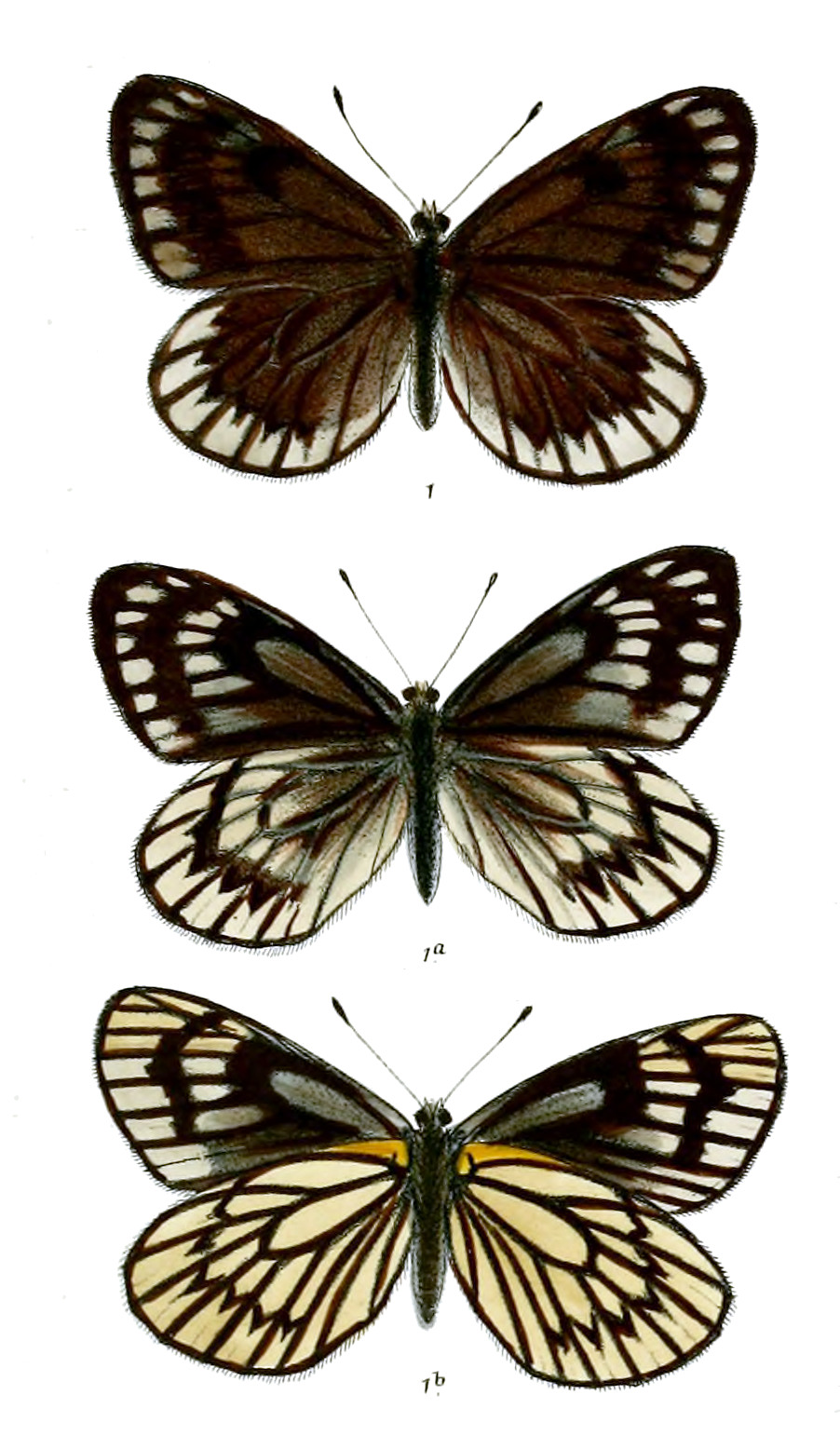

Scientific classification
- Domain: Eukaryota
- Kingdom: Animalia
- Phylum: Arthropoda
- Class: Insecta
- Order: Lepidoptera
- Family: Pieridae
- Genus: Aporia
- Species: A. nabellica

Binomial name
- Aporia nabellica (Boisduval, 1836)

= Aporia nabellica =

Dusky blackvein

Species of butterfly

Aporia nabellica, the dusky blackvein, is a mid-sized to large butterfly of the family Pieridae, that is, the yellows and whites, which is found in India and Pakistan in the western Himalayas: Kashmir to Naini Tal from 2,600 to 4,000 m (8,500 to 13,000 ft). It has a wingspan of 6 to 7 cm.

== Description ==
Males and females have the upperside white, with the veins more or less black, but the ground colour in many specimens are so densely overlaid by black scales over nearly the whole surface of both forewings and hindwings as to leave only a subterminal series of more or less rectangular spots of the white ground colour apparent on each wing, those on the hindwing are the largest and are inwardly acutely emarginate. In addition, there is a large ill-defined black patch on the discocellulars of the forewing and a small spot of the same colour generally on the discocellulars of the hindwing. Cilia of both wings black. In nearly all specimens the discoidal cells of the wings are greyish, and on the forewing there are anterior discal, elongate, greyish spots beyond the apex of the discoidal cell. A few specimens, generally females, are much lighter in colour. In these the irroration of black scales is sparse and allows much of the white ground colour to show through; the discocellulars of the forewing, however, are marked by a large black patch as in the darker individuals; and both forewings and hindwings bear postdiscal, irregular, transverse black bands; that on the forewing bisinuate, sometimes not extended below vein 2; that on the hindwing not reaching the dorsal margin, curved, and formed of somewhat ill-defined, irregular, conjoined, outwardly acute, arrow-shaped black spots. Underside: white, the veins on both wings very broadly black edged; apex of forewing very slightly, the whole surface of the hindwing more strongly suffused with yellow; the forewing sometimes clouded posteriorly with black scaling; both forewing and hindwings with postdiscal transverse black bands as on the upperside but broader; the base of the hindwing above vein 8 chrome yellow. Antennae black, the club ochraceous at apex; head and thorax clothed with fine dusky greyish-black hairs; abdomen black above, beneath greyish white.

== See also ==
- Pieridae
- List of butterflies of India
- List of butterflies of India (Pieridae)
