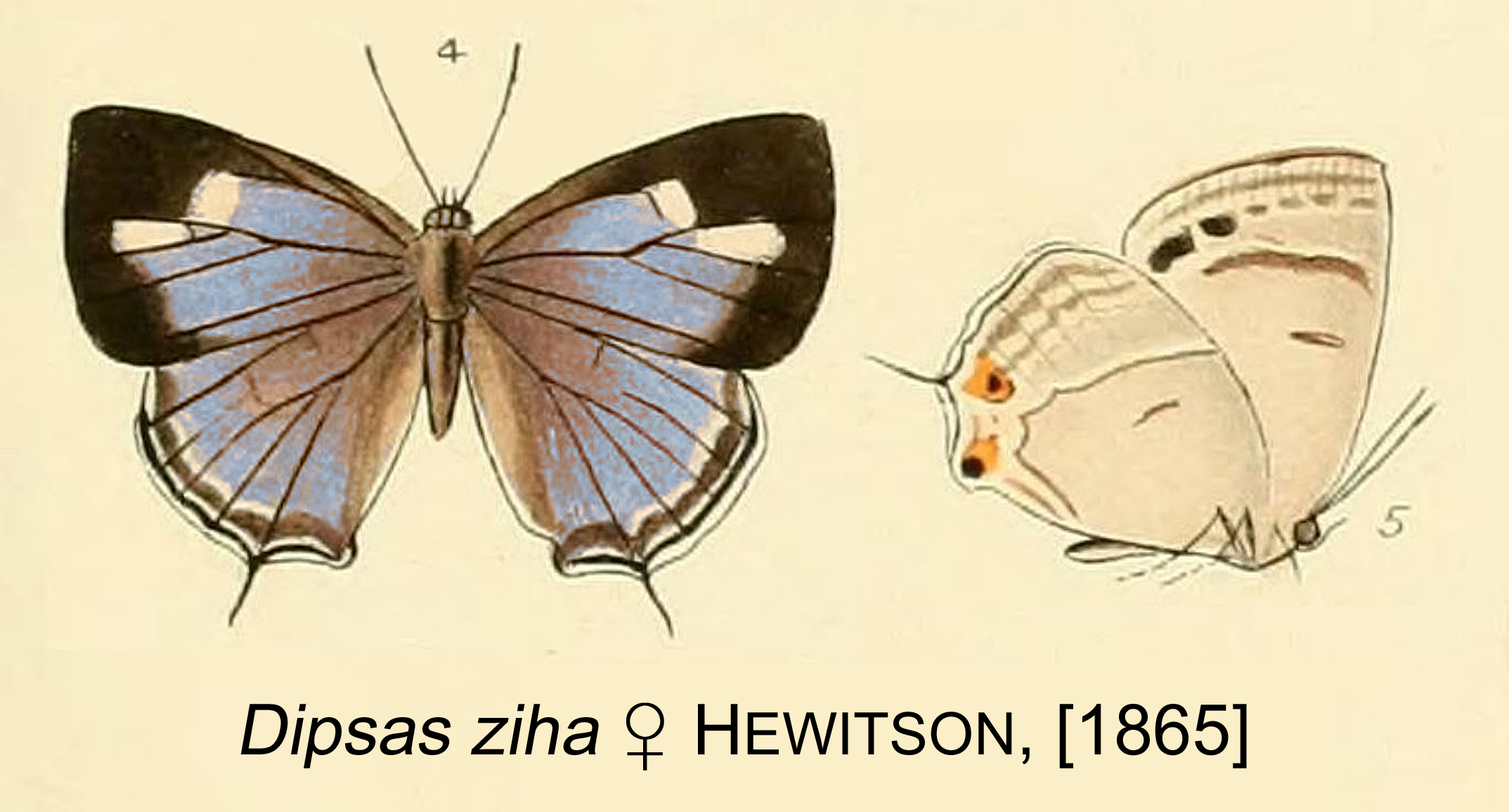

Scientific classification
- Kingdom: Animalia
- Phylum: Arthropoda
- Class: Insecta
- Order: Lepidoptera
- Family: Lycaenidae
- Genus: Shizuyaozephyrus
- Species: S. ziha

Binomial name
- Shizuyaozephyrus ziha (Hewitson, 1865)

= Shizuyaozephyrus ziha =

White-spotted hairstreak

Species of butterfly

Shizuyaozephyrus ziha, the white-spotted hairstreak, is a small butterfly found in India that belongs to the lycaenids or blues family.

== Range ==
The butterfly occurs in India and Pakistan.

== Status ==
In 1932, William Harry Evans described the species as rare.

== See also ==
- Lycaenidae
- List of butterflies of India (Lycaenidae)
