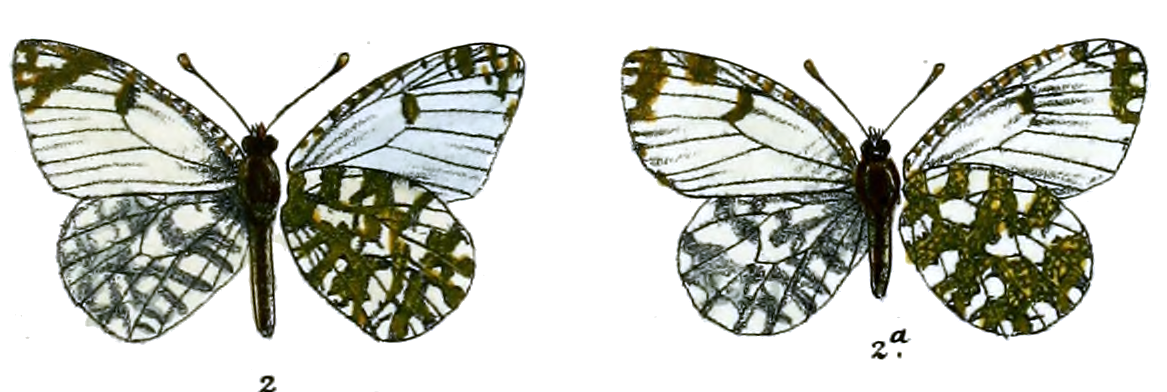

Scientific classification
- Kingdom: Animalia
- Phylum: Arthropoda
- Class: Insecta
- Order: Lepidoptera
- Family: Pieridae
- Genus: Euchloe
- Species: E. daphalis

Binomial name
- Euchloe daphalis (Moore, 1865)

Synonyms
- Synchloe belia daphalis Moore, 1865

= Euchloe daphalis =

Species of butterfly

Euchloe daphalis is a butterfly of the family Pieridae. It is found in the western Pamirs, northern Afghanistan, Pakistan and India. It is found on arid slopes up to heights of 2,500 to 3,000 meters.

Adults are on wing from June to July.
