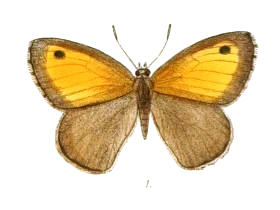

Scientific classification
- Kingdom: Animalia
- Phylum: Arthropoda
- Clade: Pancrustacea
- Class: Insecta
- Order: Lepidoptera
- Family: Nymphalidae
- Genus: Hyponephele
- Species: H. pulchella

Binomial name
- Hyponephele pulchella (C. & R. Felder, [1867])

Synonyms
- Chortobius pulchella

= Hyponephele pulchella =

Species of butterfly

Hyponephele pulchella is a butterfly species belonging to the family Nymphalidae. It is found from Turkestan to the western parts of the Himalayas and in Afghanistan.

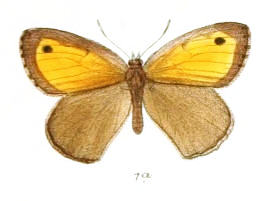
