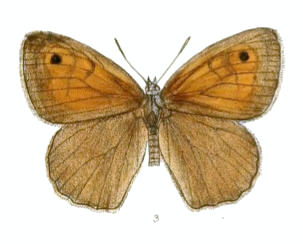

Scientific classification
- Kingdom: Animalia
- Phylum: Arthropoda
- Clade: Pancrustacea
- Class: Insecta
- Order: Lepidoptera
- Family: Nymphalidae
- Genus: Hyponephele
- Species: H. pulchra

Binomial name
- Hyponephele pulchra (C. & R. Felder, [1867])

Synonyms
- Chortobius pulchra; Maniola pulchra

= Hyponephele pulchra =

Species of butterfly

Hyponephele pulchra, the tawny meadowbrown, is a butterfly species belonging to the family Nymphalidae. It is found in the Himalayas, from Chitral to Kumaon and in Kashmir.

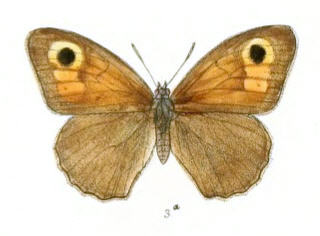
