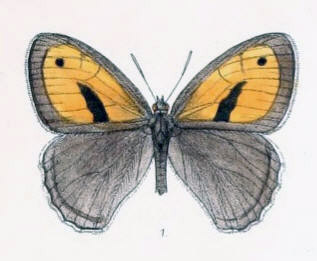

Scientific classification
- Kingdom: Animalia
- Phylum: Arthropoda
- Clade: Pancrustacea
- Class: Insecta
- Order: Lepidoptera
- Family: Nymphalidae
- Genus: Hyponephele
- Species: H. davendra

Binomial name
- Hyponephele davendra (Moore, 1865)

= Hyponephele davendra =

Species of butterfly

Hyponephele davendra, the white-ringed meadowbrown, is a butterfly species belonging to the family Nymphalidae. It can be found from Iran to Afghanistan, India, and Pakistan, the Himalayas, Tibet, and central Asia.

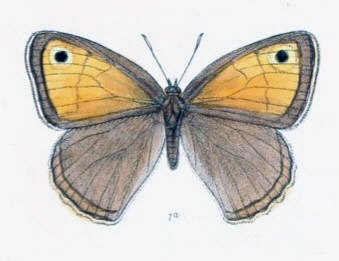

The wingspan is 38–45 mm. Adults are on wing in multiple generations per year.

== Subspecies ==
- Hyponephele davendra seravschana (Ghissarsky, Zeravshansky, Turkestansky Mountains)
- Hyponephele davendra fergana (Alaisky Mountains, northern and inner Tian-Shan)
- Hyponephele davendra latistigma (Kopet-Dagh, southern Ghissar)
