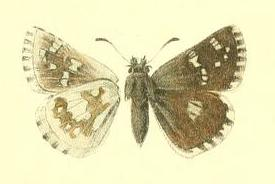

Scientific classification
- Domain: Eukaryota
- Kingdom: Animalia
- Phylum: Arthropoda
- Class: Insecta
- Order: Lepidoptera
- Family: Hesperiidae
- Genus: Pyrgus
- Species: P. cashmirensis

Binomial name
- Pyrgus cashmirensis Moore, 1874

= Pyrgus cashmirensis =

Species of skipper butterfly genus Pyrgus

Pyrgus cashmirensis is a butterfly of the family Hesperiidae. It is found in Tajikistan, north-eastern Afghanistan, northern Pakistan and Kashmir.

== Subspecies ==
- Pyrgus cashmirensis cashmirensis
- Pyrgus cashmirensis pseudoalpinus Alberti, 1952 (north-eastern Afghanistan, Pakistan)
- Pyrgus cashmirensis pumilus de Jong, 1979 (Ghissar, Alai, Darvaz, Pamirs)
