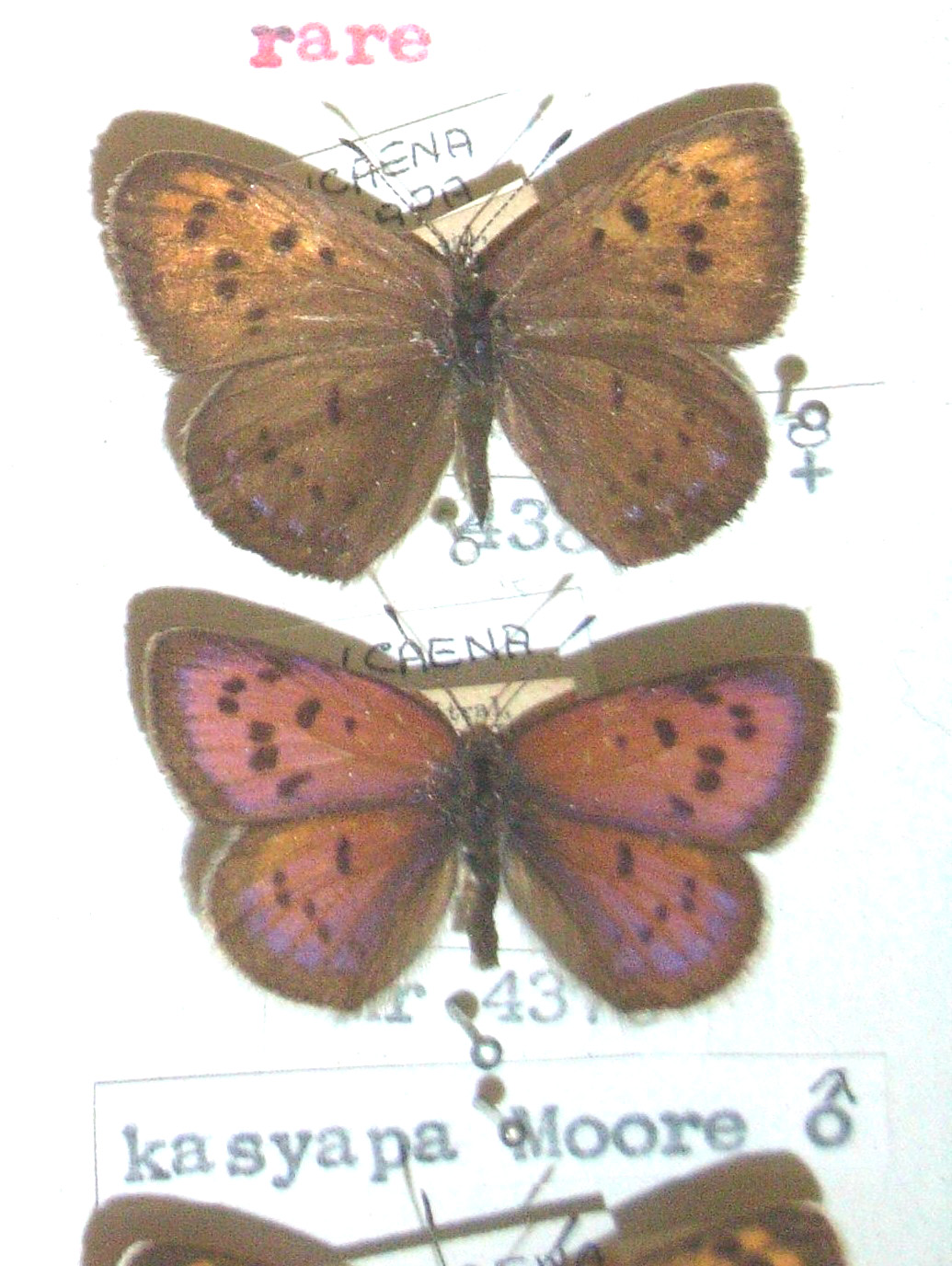
- Female above, and male

Scientific classification
- Kingdom: Animalia
- Phylum: Arthropoda
- Class: Insecta
- Order: Lepidoptera
- Family: Lycaenidae
- Genus: Lycaena
- Species: L. kasyapa

Binomial name
- Lycaena kasyapa (Moore, 1865)

= Lycaena kasyapa =

Green copper

Species of butterfly

Lycaena kasyapa, the green copper, is a small butterfly found in India and Pakistan that belongs to the lycaenids or blues family. The species was first described by Frederic Moore in 1865.

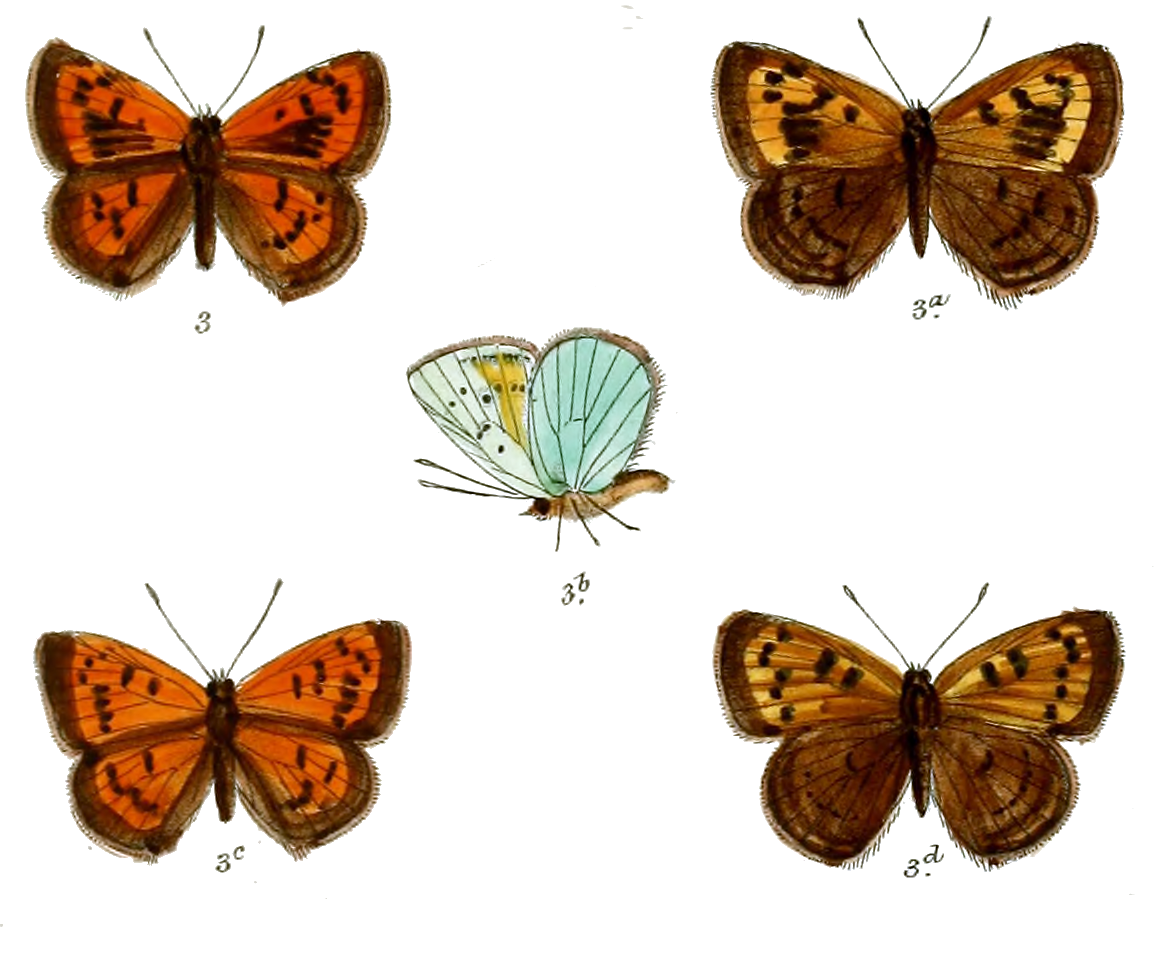

== See also ==
- List of butterflies of India
- List of butterflies of India (Lycaenidae)
