= Urios =

Urios may refer to:

== People ==
- Christophe Urios (born 1965), French rugby union player
- Francisca Urio (born 1981), German singer-songwriter
- Rolando Uríos (born 1971), Cuban-Spanish handball player

== Other uses ==
- Father Saturnino Urios University, college in the Philippines
- Azanus urios, species of butterfly
- Carate Urio, comune in Italy
- Urios, an organization at the University of Utrecht affiliated with the Utrecht Journal of International and European Law
