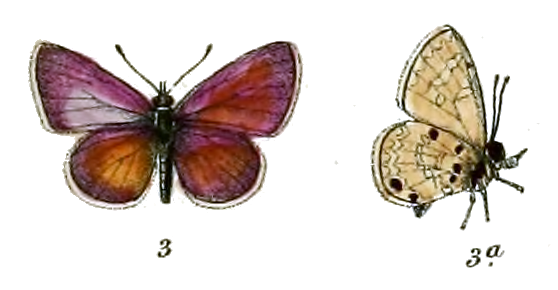
- In Charles Swinhoe's Lepidoptera Indica

Scientific classification
- Kingdom: Animalia
- Phylum: Arthropoda
- Clade: Pancrustacea
- Class: Insecta
- Order: Lepidoptera
- Family: Lycaenidae
- Genus: Azanus
- Species: A. uranus

Binomial name
- Azanus uranus Butler 1886

= Azanus uranus =

Dull babul blue

Species of butterfly

Azanus uranus, the dull babul blue or Indian babul blue, is a small butterfly found in India that belongs to the lycaenids or blues family. It was first described by Arthur Gardiner Butler in 1886.

== Description ==
The species closely resembles A. ubaldus, Cramer. The male on the upperside has the ground colour much paler and the terminal edging on both forewings and hindwings much narrower, reduced, in fact, to a conspicuous dark brown anteciliary line, while the two dark spots at the tornal area of the hindwing are more or less obsolescent. In the female on the upperside the ground colour is also much paler than in the female of A. ubaldus, but the suffusion of purplish blue at the base of the wings in a solitary female specimen is spread slightly further outwards than it is in the female of A. ubaldus.

Underside: ground colour greyish white; character and disposition of the markings much as in A. ubaldus, but faint and not clearly defined, often many of them scarcely traceable; the transverse subbasal row of black spots on the hindwing either completely absent or barely visible. The black subcostal spot in interspace 7, though smaller than in A. ubaldus, seems to be always present, while the tornal black spots seem to be particularly large and prominent in both sexes.

== See also ==
- List of butterflies of India
- List of butterflies of India (Lycaenidae)
