= Savandurga =

Monolith hill in Karnataka, India

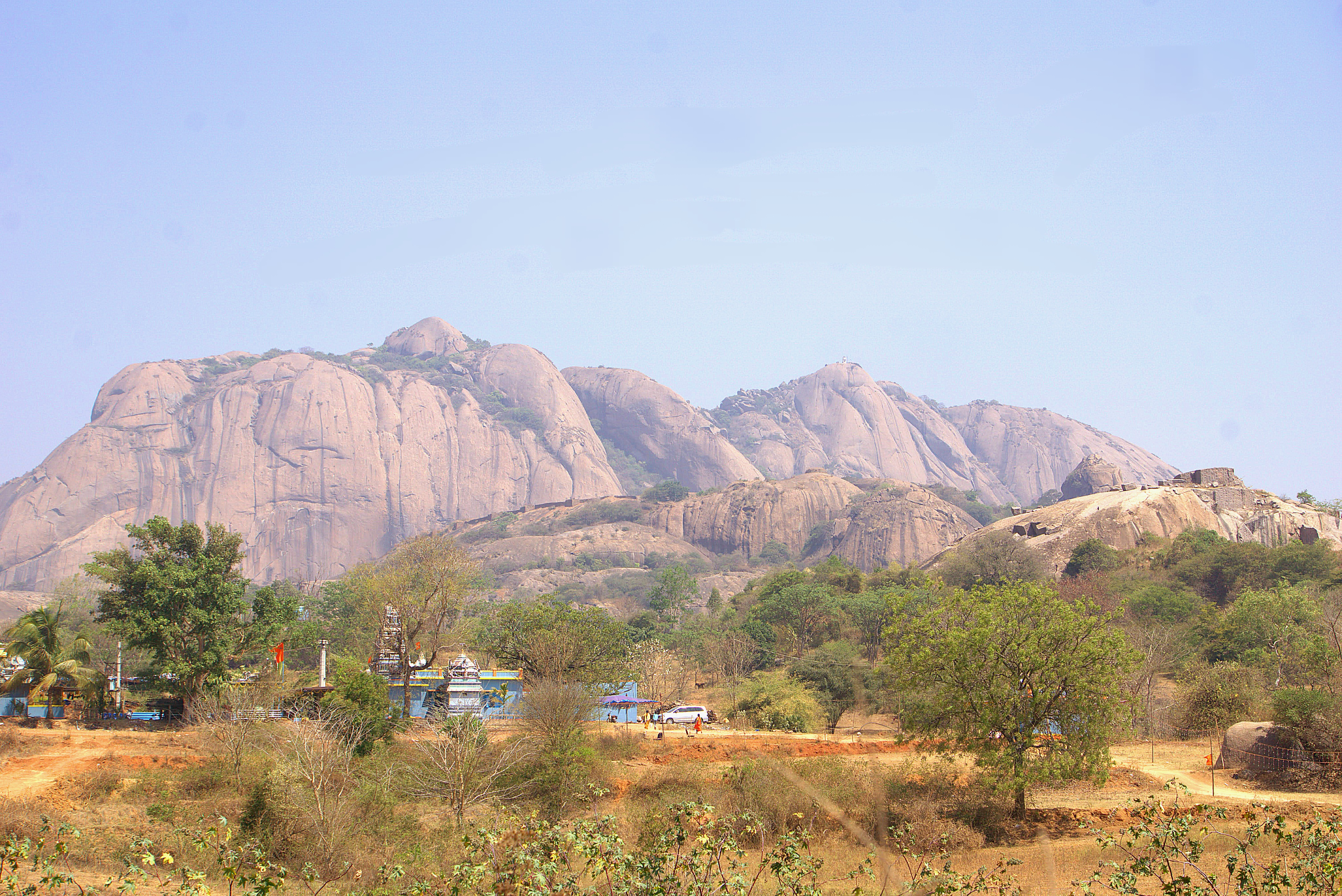

Highest point
- Elevation: 1,226 metres (4,022 ft)
- Coordinates: 12°55′10″N 77°17′32″E

Naming
- Etymology: Hoysala Ballala III from Madabalu where it is called Savandi; Another view is that the name originates from Samantadurga
- Defining authority: Government of Karnataka

Geography
- Location within Karnataka
- Location: Savanadurga State Forest, Madagi Taluka, Ramanagara district, Karnataka
- Country: India
- State: Karnataka
- Region: South Karnataka
- District: Ramanagara

Geology
- Formed by: Two hills named black hill (Karigudda) and white hill (Biligudda)
- Rock age: 2-3 billion years
- Mountain type: Monolith Hill

Climbing
- Easiest route: South-Side route

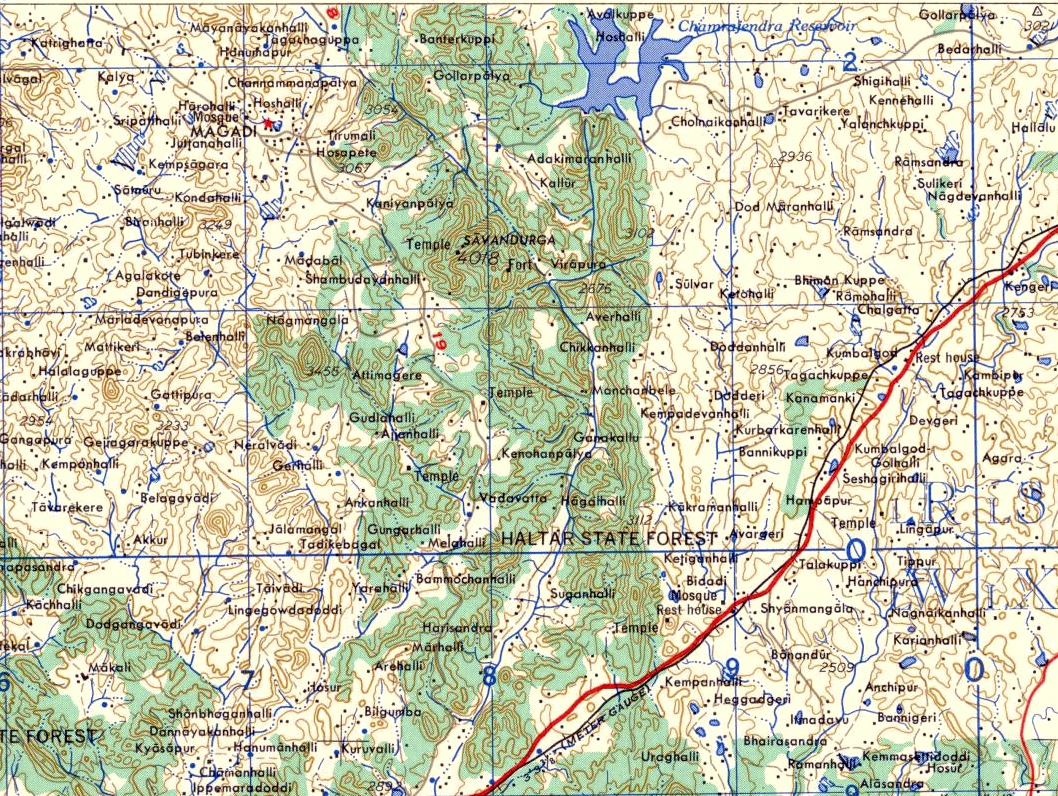
Map of the Savandurga area

Savandurga is a hill 60 km west of Bengaluru, Karnataka, off the Magadi road in India. It is the largest monolith hills in Asia. The hill rises to 1226 m above mean sea level and forms a part of the Deccan Plateau. It consists of peninsular gneiss, granites, basic dykes, and laterites. The Arkavathi river passes nearby through the Thippagondanahalli reservoir and towards Manchanabele dam.

The Savandurga hills are frequented by pilgrims who come to visit the Savandi Veerabhadreshwara Swamy and Narasimha Swamy temple situated at the foothills. Rock climbers, cave explorers, and adventurers are among others who frequent the locale. Nearby Manchanabele Dam is often visited by water-sports enthusiasts.

== Origin of name ==
Savandurga is formed by two hills locally known as Karigudda (black hill) and Biligudda (white hill). The earliest record of the name of the hill is from 1340 AD by Hoysala Ballala III from Madabalu where it is called Savandi. Another view is that the name originates from Samantadurga, attributed to a Samantharaya, a governor under Ahchutaraya at Magadi, although there is no inscription confirming this. This was the secondary capital of the Magadi rulers such as Kempegowda. From 1638 to 1728, Mysore took over Savandurga, with the Dalavayi Devaraja controlling it from the palace at Nelapattana. In 1791 Lord Cornwallis captured it from Tipu Sultan's forces during the Third Anglo-Mysore War. Robert Home in his Select views in Mysore (1794) shows distant views of the hill from Bangalore. He called it Savinadurga or the fort of death. There were no steps to reach the hill top and it was covered by bamboos and other trees forming a barricade.

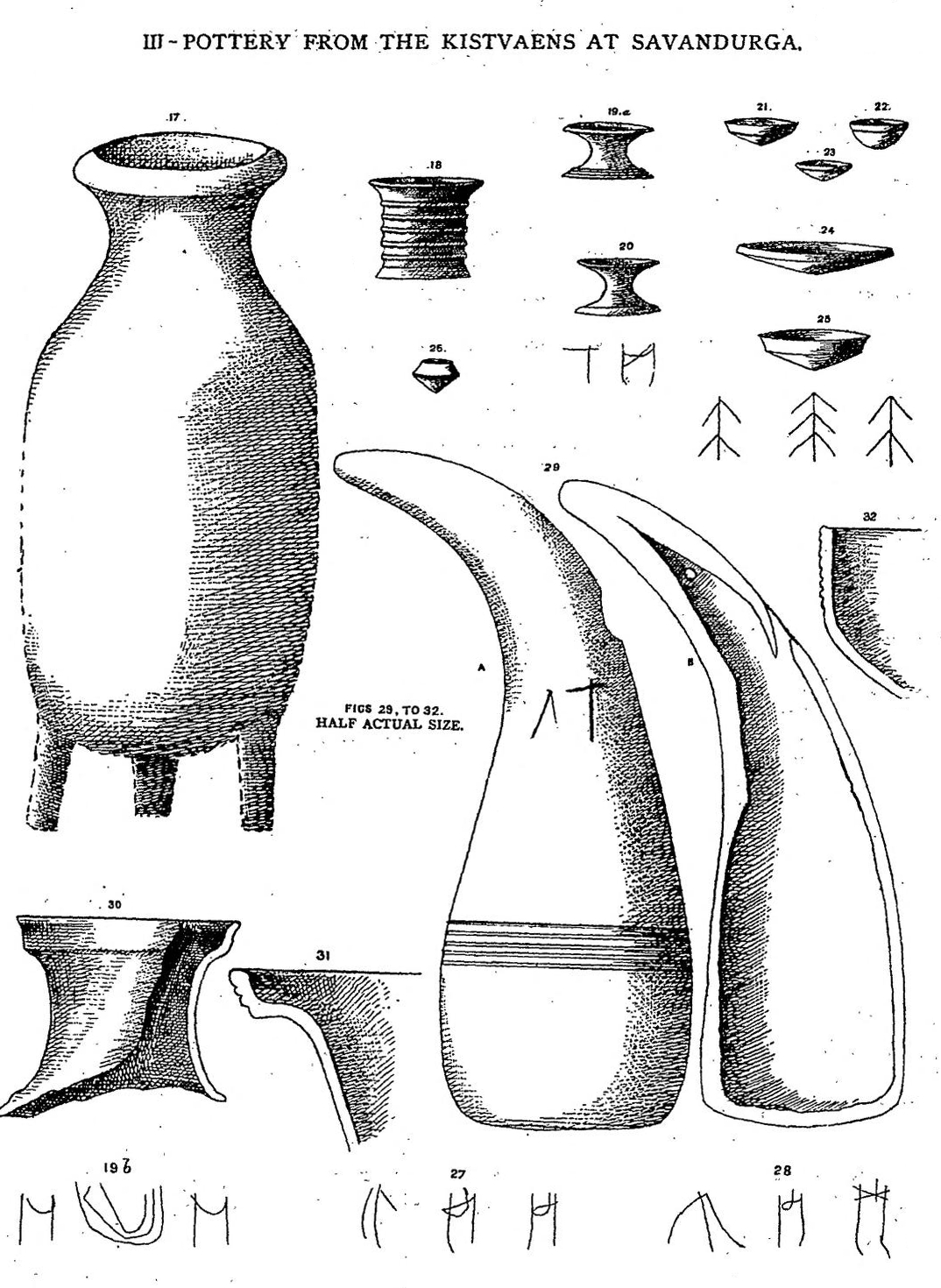
Pottery from the Kistvaens Savandurga, excavated in 1881

Megalithic burial urns have been found in the area. Saavana in Sanskrit also means three time rituals.

The principal local deity is Sri Savandi Veerabhadraswamy Virabhadra, a temple to whom is situated at the foot of the Savandurga hill. The lord Veerabhadraswamy has followers across the south Karnataka districts like Bangalore, Ramanagara, Tumkur and Mysore.

There is a Temple of Sri Lakshmi Narasimha Swamy, where there is an Idol of Lord Narasimha has been worshiped for many generations.

== Climbing ==
There are a dozen routes, bolted or otherwise, on the south face of the monolith. Most of these routes can be completed in half a day to a day, depending on various factors. Some of the routes have long runouts, and most of them face south or are exposed to the south-east, so that when the sun comes up, the rock becomes quite hot.

== Fauna ==
The hills are home to the endangered yellow-throated bulbuls and were once home to long-billed vultures and white-backed vultures. Other wildlife includes sloth bear and leopard.

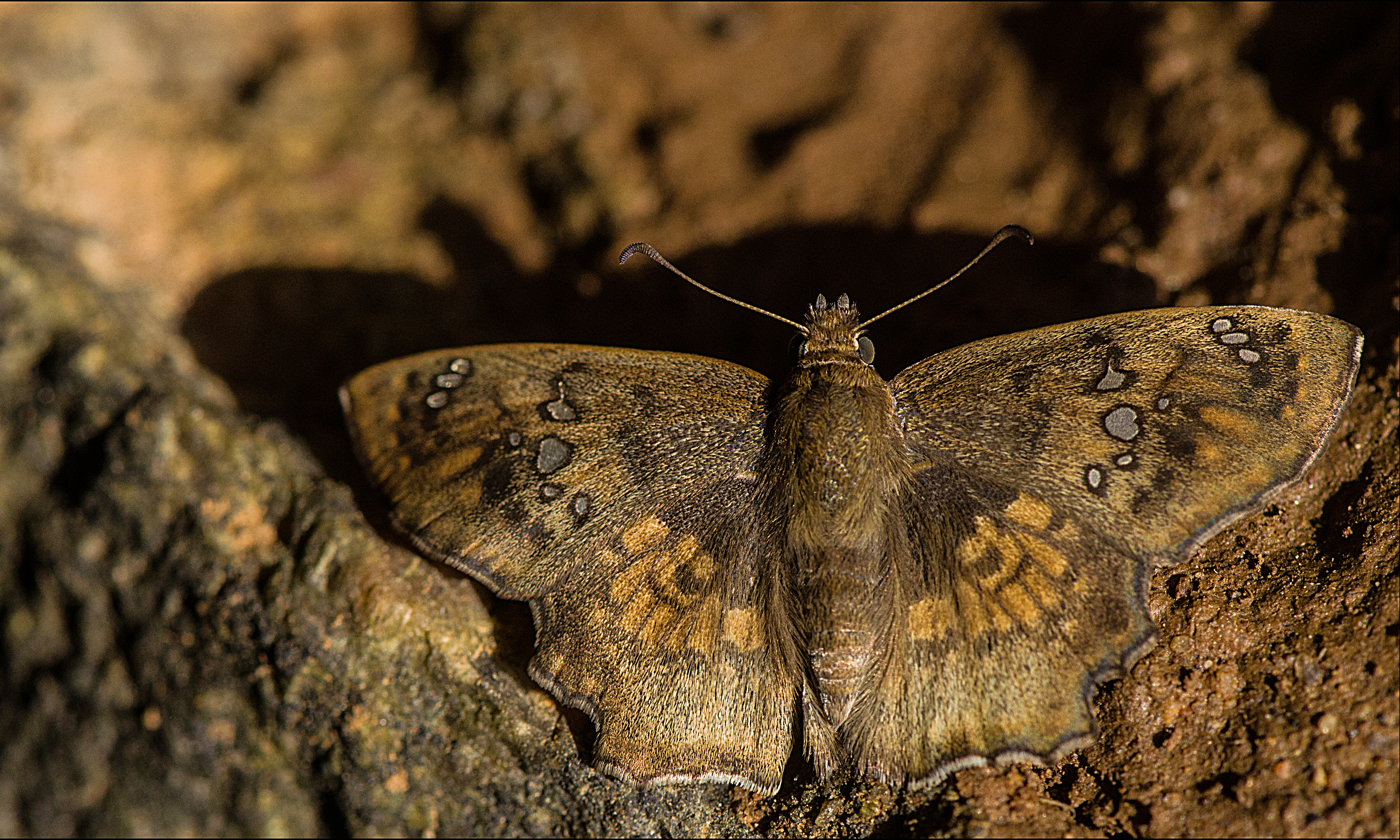
Caprona ransonnetii

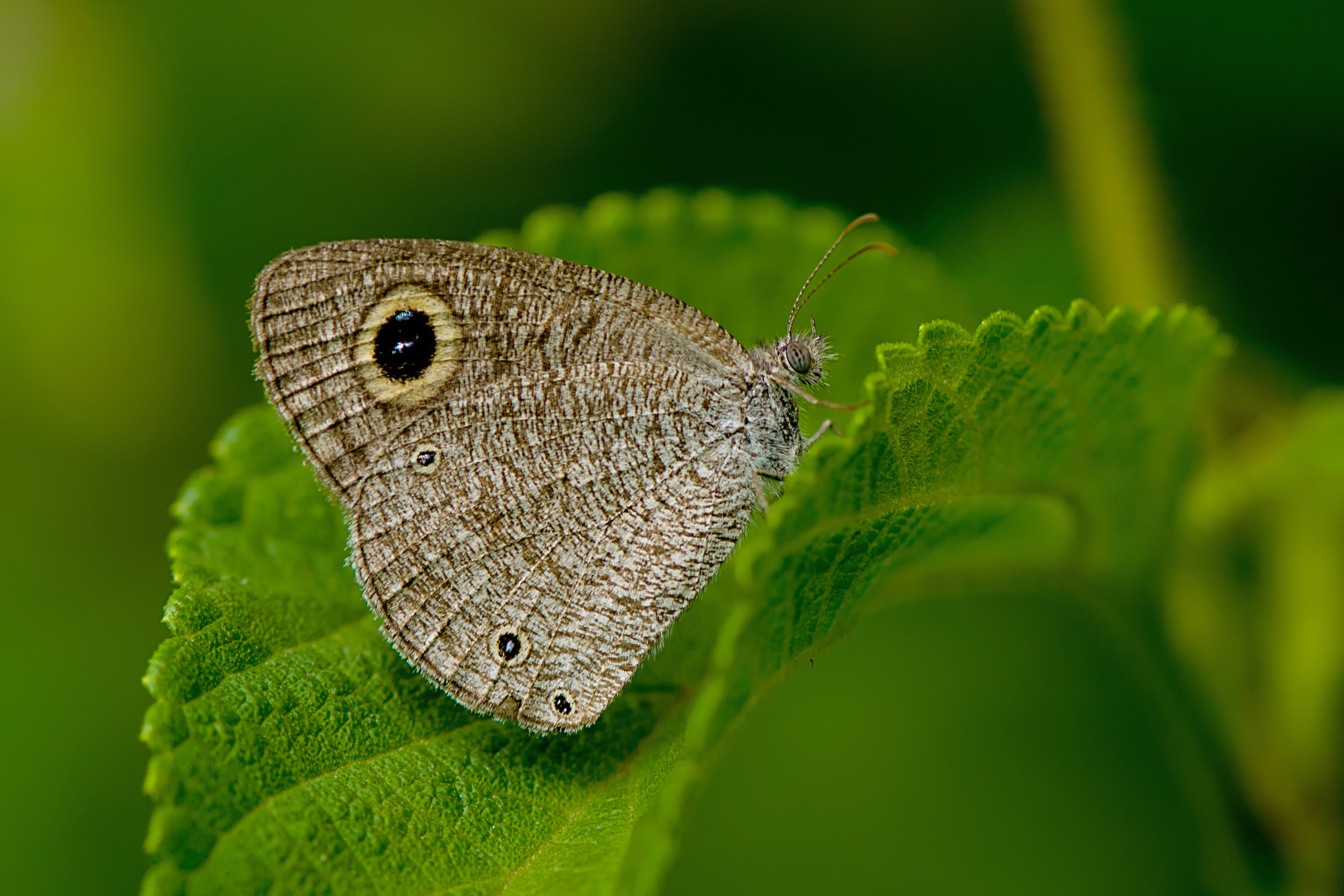
Ypthima asterope

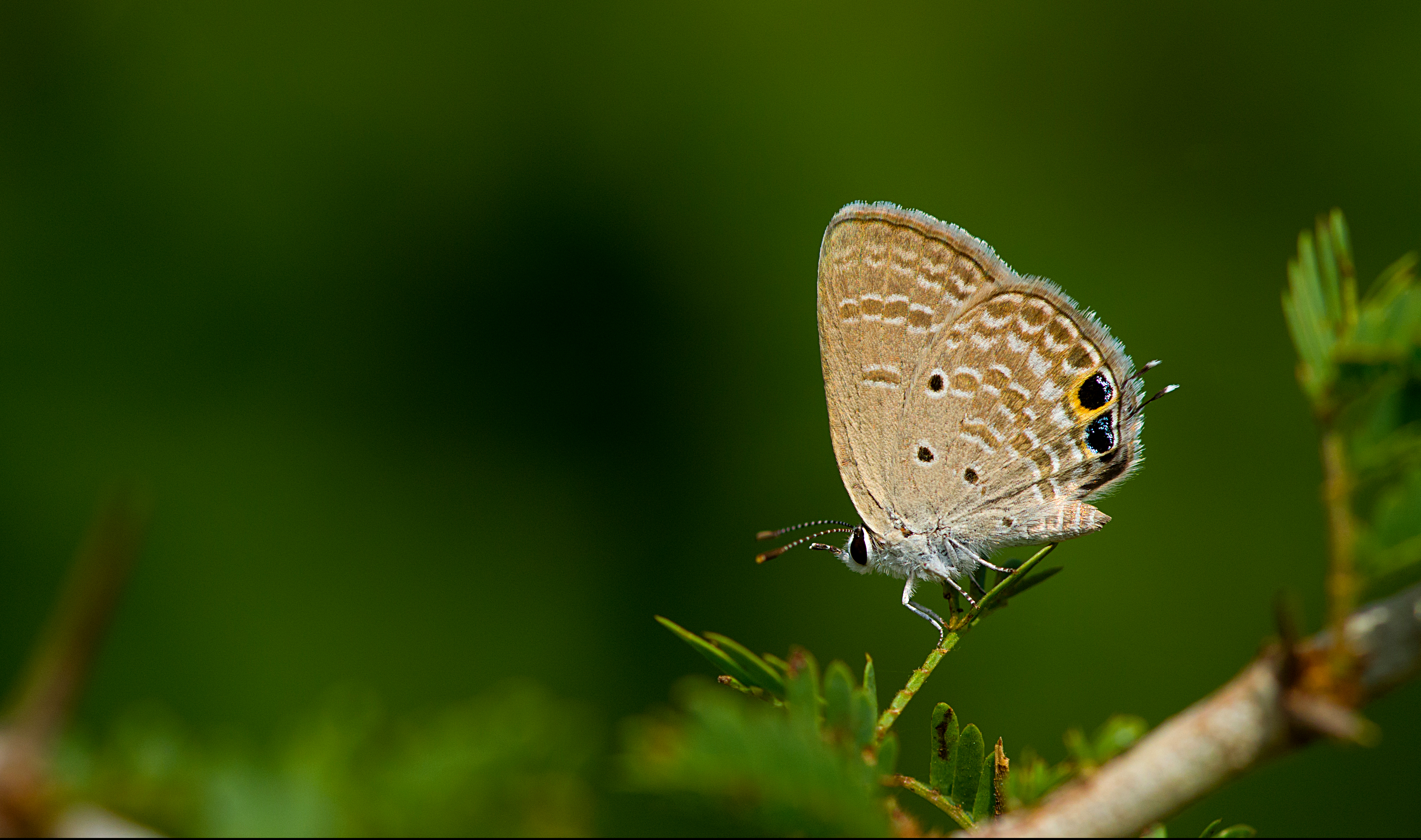
Luthrodes contracta

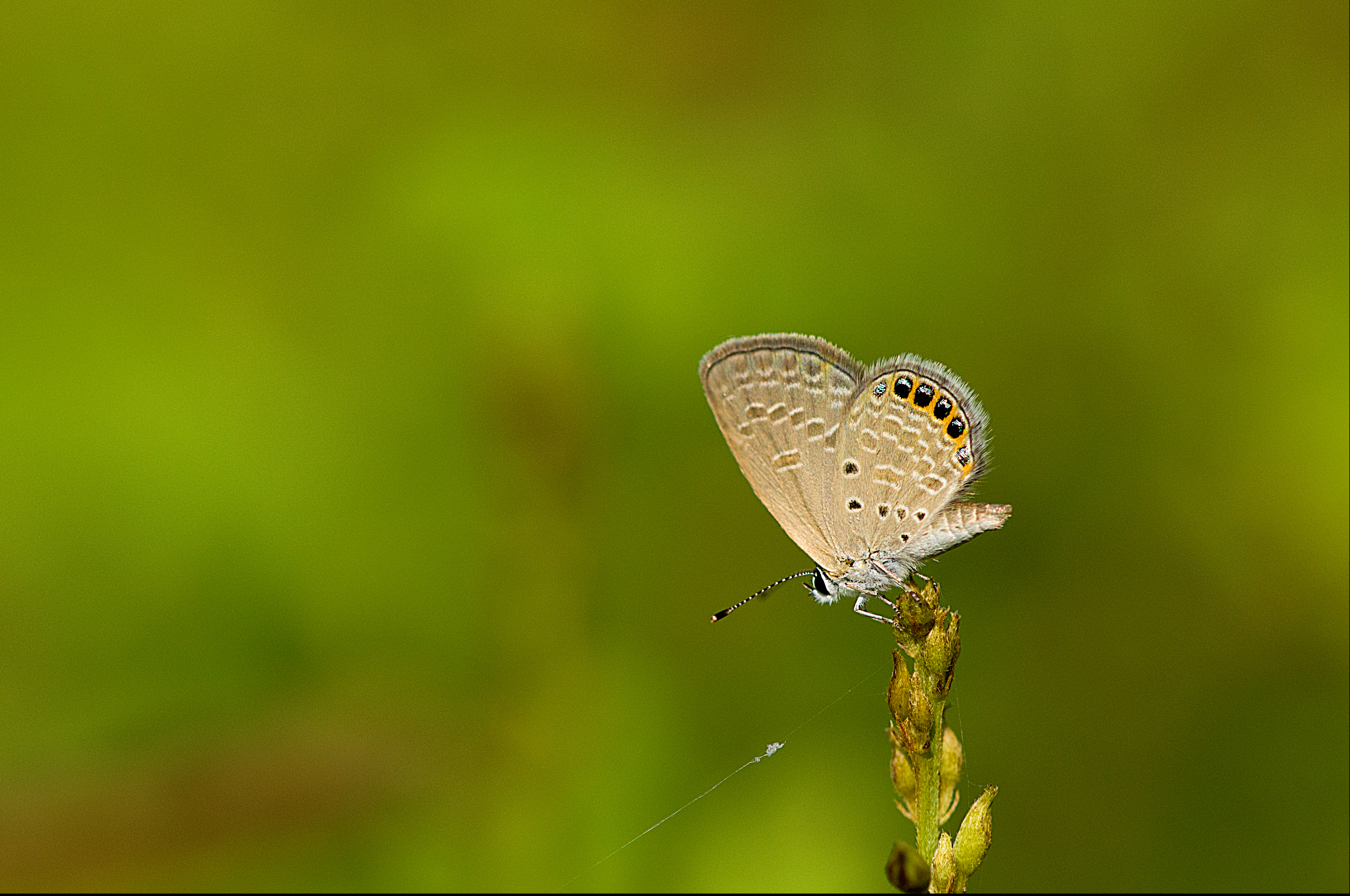
Grass jewel

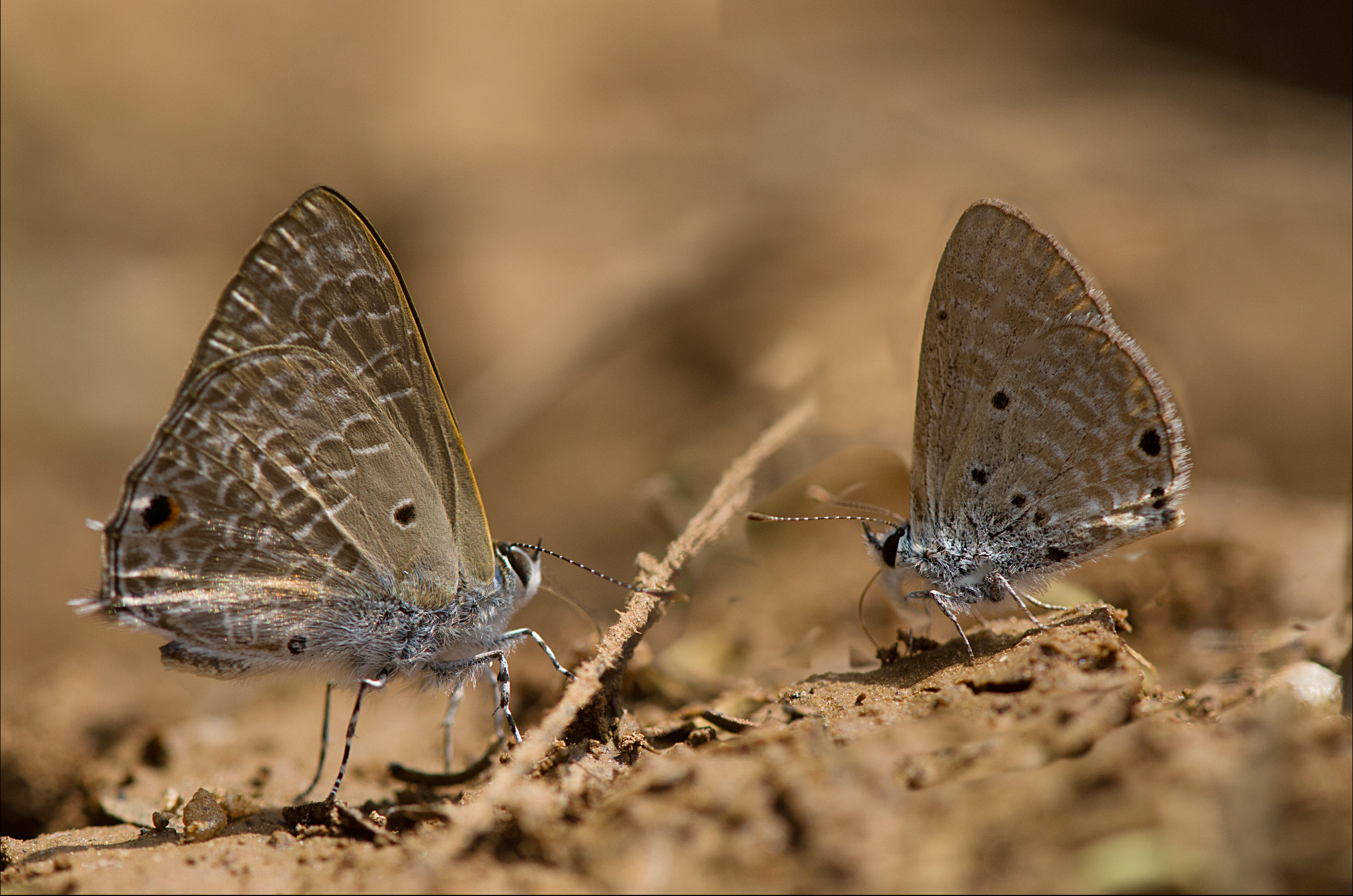
Pointed ciliate blue (left)
and bright babul blue (right

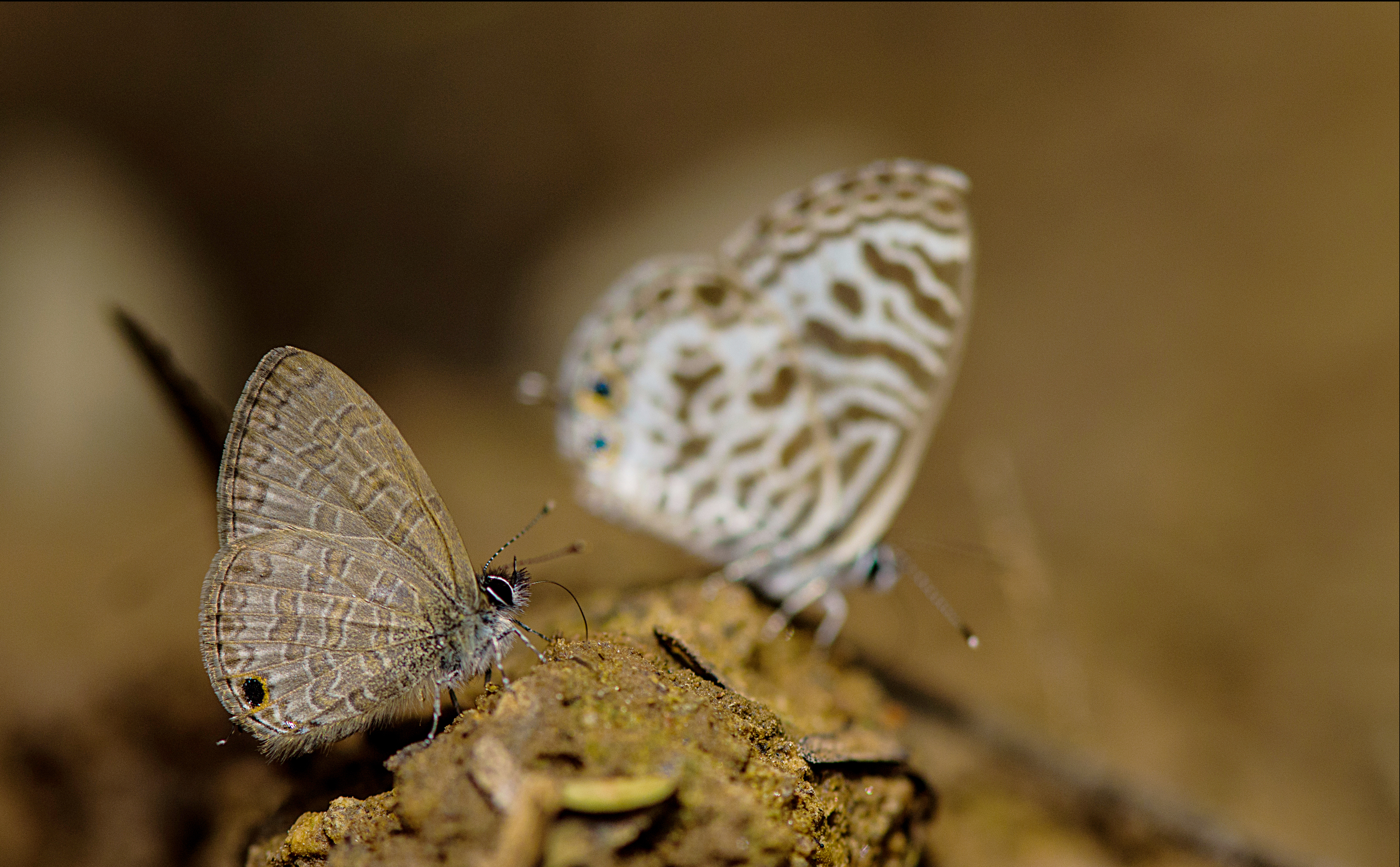
Common lineblue

== Flora ==
Surrounding the area is a state forest with scrub and dry deciduous forest covering 27 km. The degraded forest, which is considered as shrub and tree savanna of the Anogeissus–Chloroxylon–Acacia series is highly diverse, recording over 59 tree and 119 shrub species.
