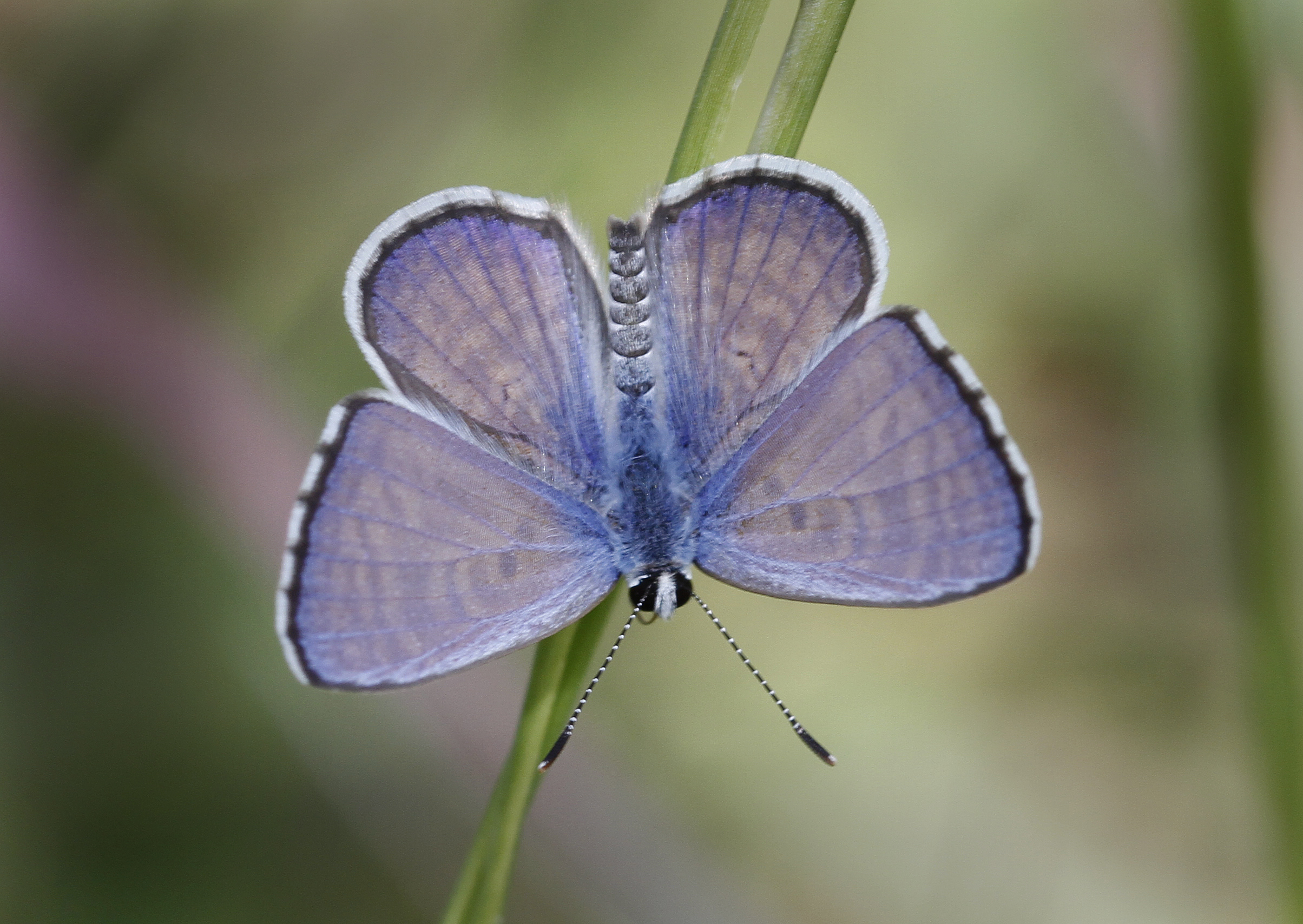
- Upper side
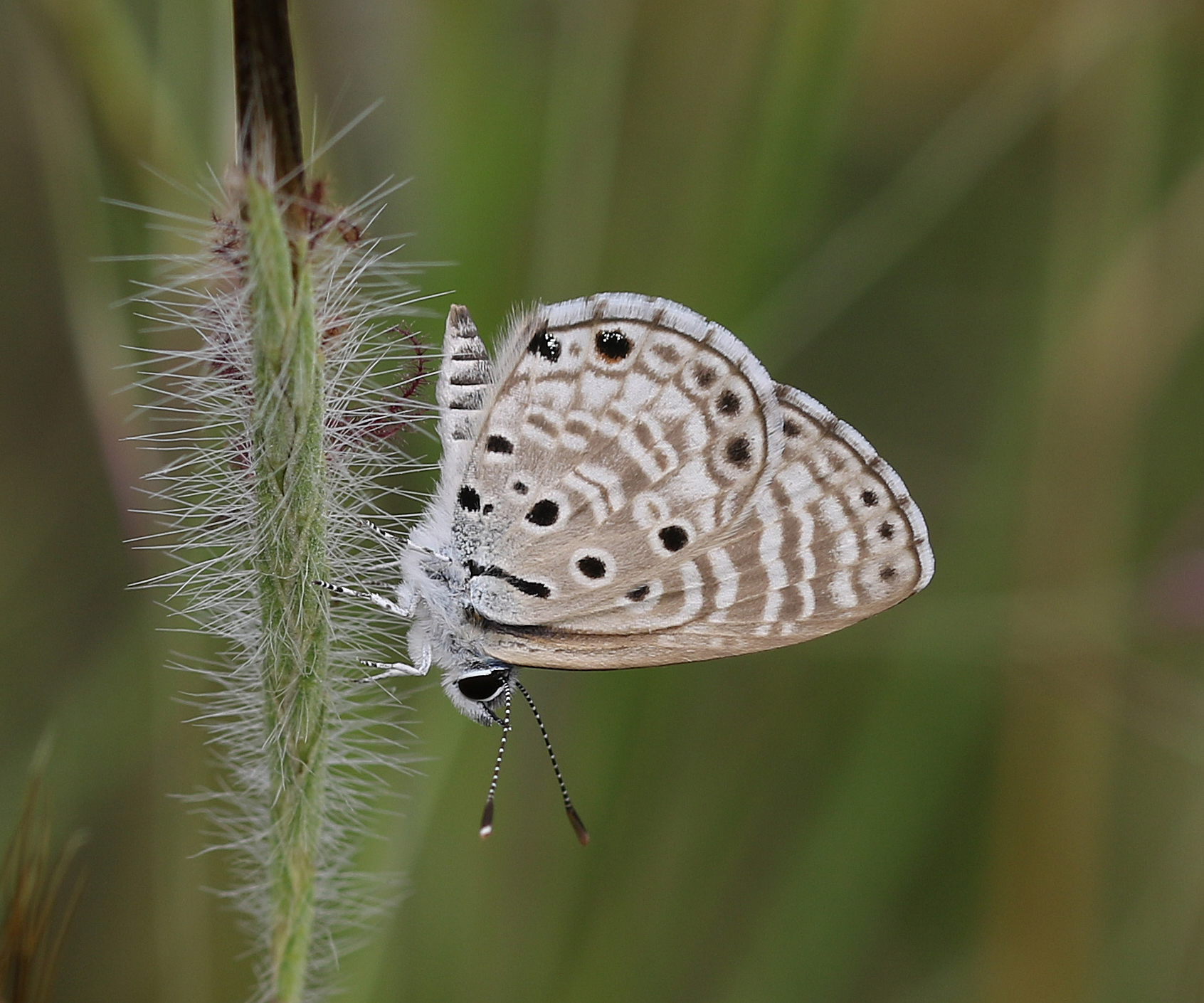
- Underside

Conservation status
- Least Concern (IUCN 3.1)

Scientific classification
- Kingdom: Animalia
- Phylum: Arthropoda
- Clade: Pancrustacea
- Class: Insecta
- Order: Lepidoptera
- Family: Lycaenidae
- Genus: Azanus
- Species: A. jesous

Binomial name
- Azanus jesous (Guérin, 1847)

Synonyms
- Polyommatus jesous Guérin-Méneville, 1849; Lampides agave Walker, 1870; Lampides sigillata Butler, 1876

= Azanus jesous =

African babul blue

Species of butterfly

Azanus jesous, the African babul blue or topaz-spotted blue, is a small butterfly found in Africa, Egypt, Syria, India, Sri Lanka and Myanmar that belongs to the lycaenids or blues family.

== Description ==
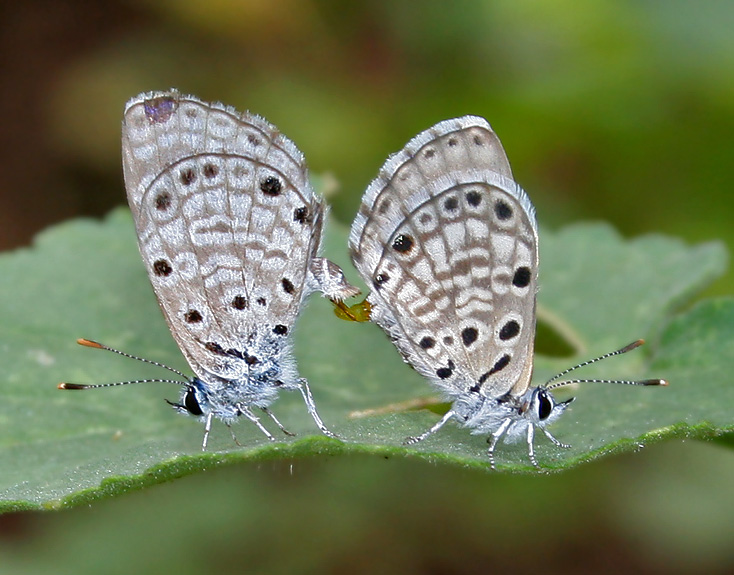
Mating in Hyderabad, India

The male upperside is a paler and much brighter purple than in A. ubaldus, the dark blue tint at the base of the wings is more pronounced. Forewing: without the clothing of specialized hair-like scales so conspicuous in A. ubaldus. Hindwing: with the dark tornal spots very obscure. Forewings and hindwings: with only slender dark anteciliary lines, but no regular brown edging. Underside: dull pale grey. Forewing: costal margin brown, a black white-encircled spot in cell, a dark chestnut-brown streak between vein 12 and subcostal vein; similarly coloured but somewhat paler transverse bars cross the upper discal area of the wing as follows: one on the discocellulars and three beyond, each bar edged internally and externally with white; below this two elongate brownish white-edged spots placed en echelon and beyond a slender, unbroken, transverse, postdiscal brown line; a transverse subterminal series of black spots, each surrounded with white, and a slender anteciliary dark line. In most specimens there is also a dusky spot below the cell near the base of the wing.

Hindwing: an outwardly oblique short streak from base of cell, a spot below it, a transverse subbasal series of four spots and a complete series of subterminal spots in interspaces 1, 2, 4, 5, 6, and 7, jet-black, each spot surrounded with white; the subterminal spot in interspace 3, a terminal small spot in interspace 7, an outwardly-oblique discal line of six elongate spots, the anterior spot shifted inwards out of line, and a transverse line beyond apex of cell, dark brown, each of these markings margined with white; on the terminal area there is an inner subterminal lunulated dark line on the inner side of the series of black spots and an anteciliary similar slender line. Cilia white, basal halves brown; on the forewing interrupted also with brown at the apices of the veins. Antennae, head, thorax and abdomen dark brown; shafts of the antennas white ringed, thorax with a little bluish pubescence; beneath: palpi, thorax and abdomen white.

Female upperside: milky brown, bluish at the base of the wings. Forewing: a large dark brown discocellular transverse spot and a small quadrate white patch beyond. Hindwing: some two or three obscure dark subterminal spots towards the tornus. In some specimens the series complete from apex to tornus, more obscure anteriorly than posteriorly. Forewings and hindwings: both with slender dark anteciliary line. Underside: ground colour slightly paler, but the markings very similar to those in the male; the transverse brown bars beyond apex of cell on the forewing longer, almost extended to the dorsal margin. Cilia, antennae, thorax and abdomen much as in the male.

Torben Larsen developed a species numbering system for his 2005 publication Butterflies of West Africa. This species is #628. The 'Larsen' numbers have since been used with permission in A Sharp Eye on Butterflies of Ghana.

== See also ==
- List of butterflies of India
- List of butterflies of India (Lycaenidae)
