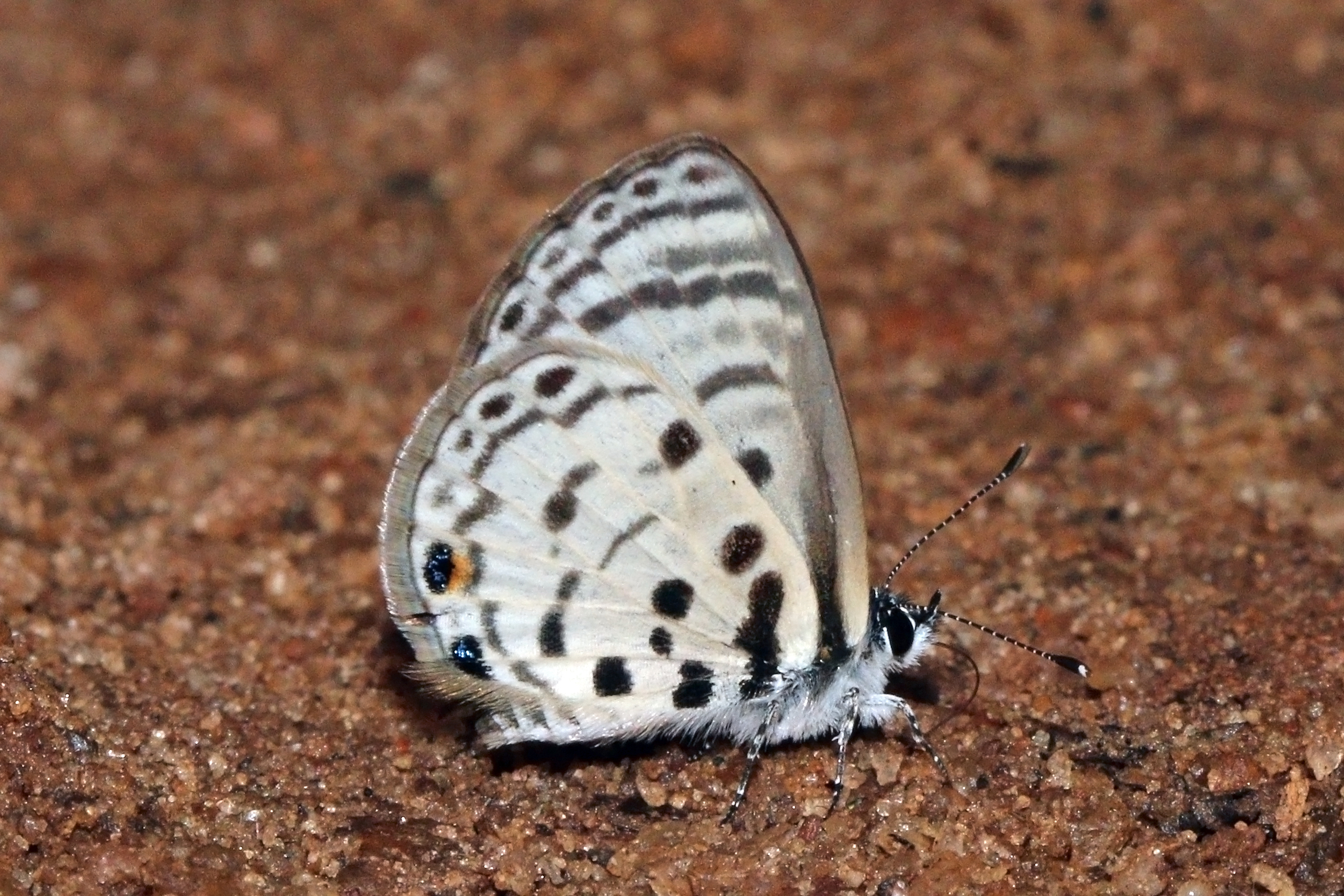
- Bobiri Forest, Ghana

Scientific classification
- Kingdom: Animalia
- Phylum: Arthropoda
- Clade: Pancrustacea
- Class: Insecta
- Order: Lepidoptera
- Family: Lycaenidae
- Genus: Azanus
- Species: A. mirza

Binomial name
- Azanus mirza (Plötz, 1880)

Synonyms
- Lycaena mirza Plötz, 1880; Azanus occidentalis Butler, 1888; Azanus mirza f. dificiens Dufrane, 1953; Azanus mirza f. ornata Dufrane, 1953; Lycaena mirzaellus Koçak, 1980

= Azanus mirza =

Pale babul blue

Species of butterfly

Azanus mirza, the pale babul blue or mirza blue, is a butterfly of the family Lycaenidae. It is found in the Afrotropical realm.

The wingspan is 20–25 millimetres (0.79–0.98 in) in males and 21–25 millimetres (0.83–0.98 in) in females. Its flight period is year-round but mainly between September and March.

The larvae feed on Acacia and Allophylus species.Torben Larsen developed a species numbering system for his 2005 publication Butterflies of West Africa. This species is #630. The 'Larsen' numbers have since been used with permission in A Sharp Eye on Butterflies of Ghana.
