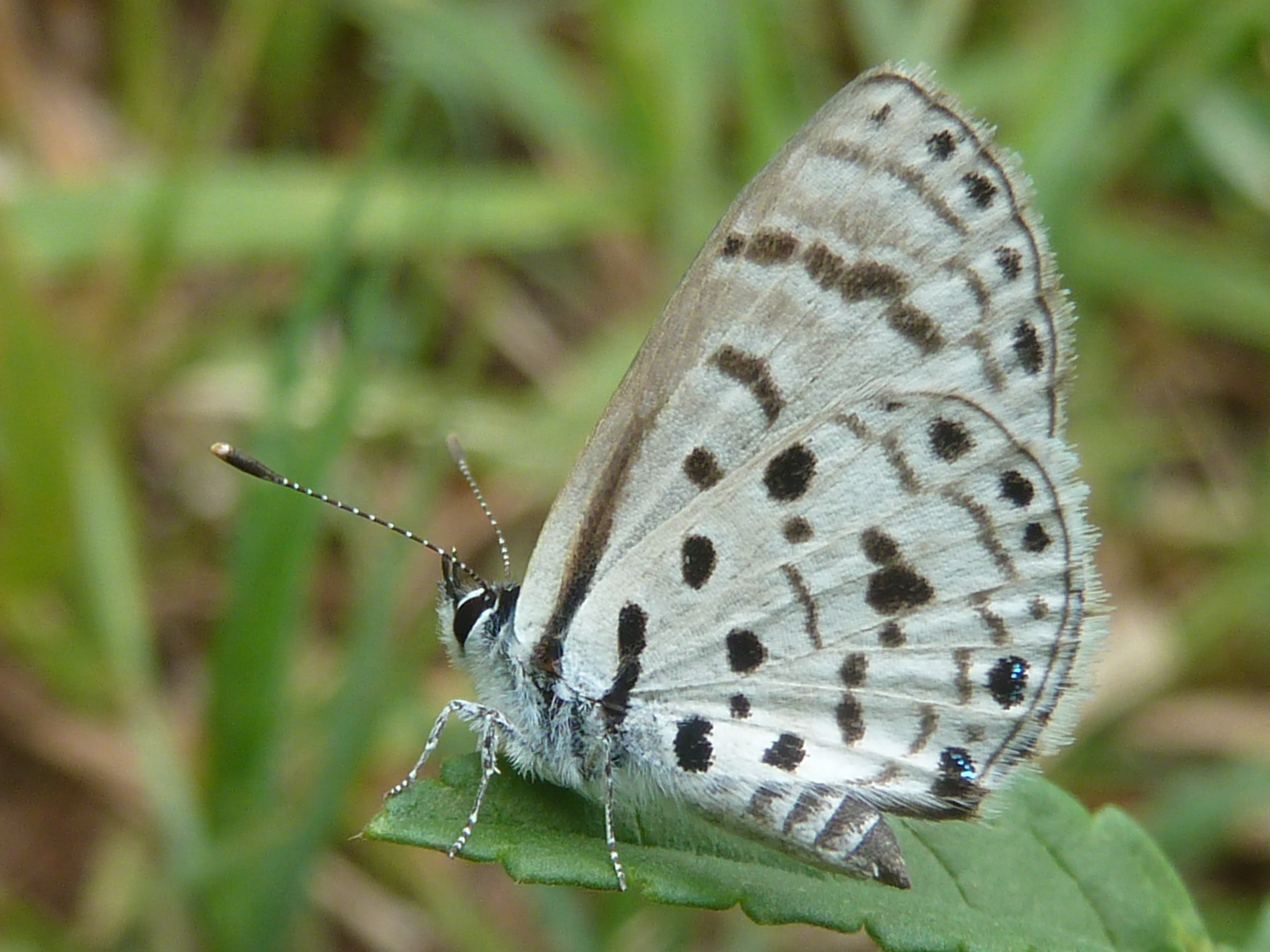

Scientific classification
- Kingdom: Animalia
- Phylum: Arthropoda
- Clade: Pancrustacea
- Class: Insecta
- Order: Lepidoptera
- Family: Lycaenidae
- Genus: Azanus
- Species: A. moriqua

Binomial name
- Azanus moriqua (Wallengren, 1857)

Synonyms
- Lycaena moriqua Wallengren, 1857; Lycaena benigna Möschler, 1884

= Azanus moriqua =

Black-bordered babul blue

Species of butterfly

Azanus moriqua, the black-bordered babul blue or thorn-tree blue, is a butterfly of the family Lycaenidae. It is found in the Afrotropical realm.

The wingspan is 19–24 mm in males and 19–25 mm in females. Its flight period is year-round but mainly between September and May.

The larvae feed on Acacia species.

Torben Larsen developed a species numbering system for his 2005 publication Butterflies of West Africa. This species is #629. The 'Larsen' numbers have since been used with permission in A Sharp Eye on Butterflies of Ghana.
