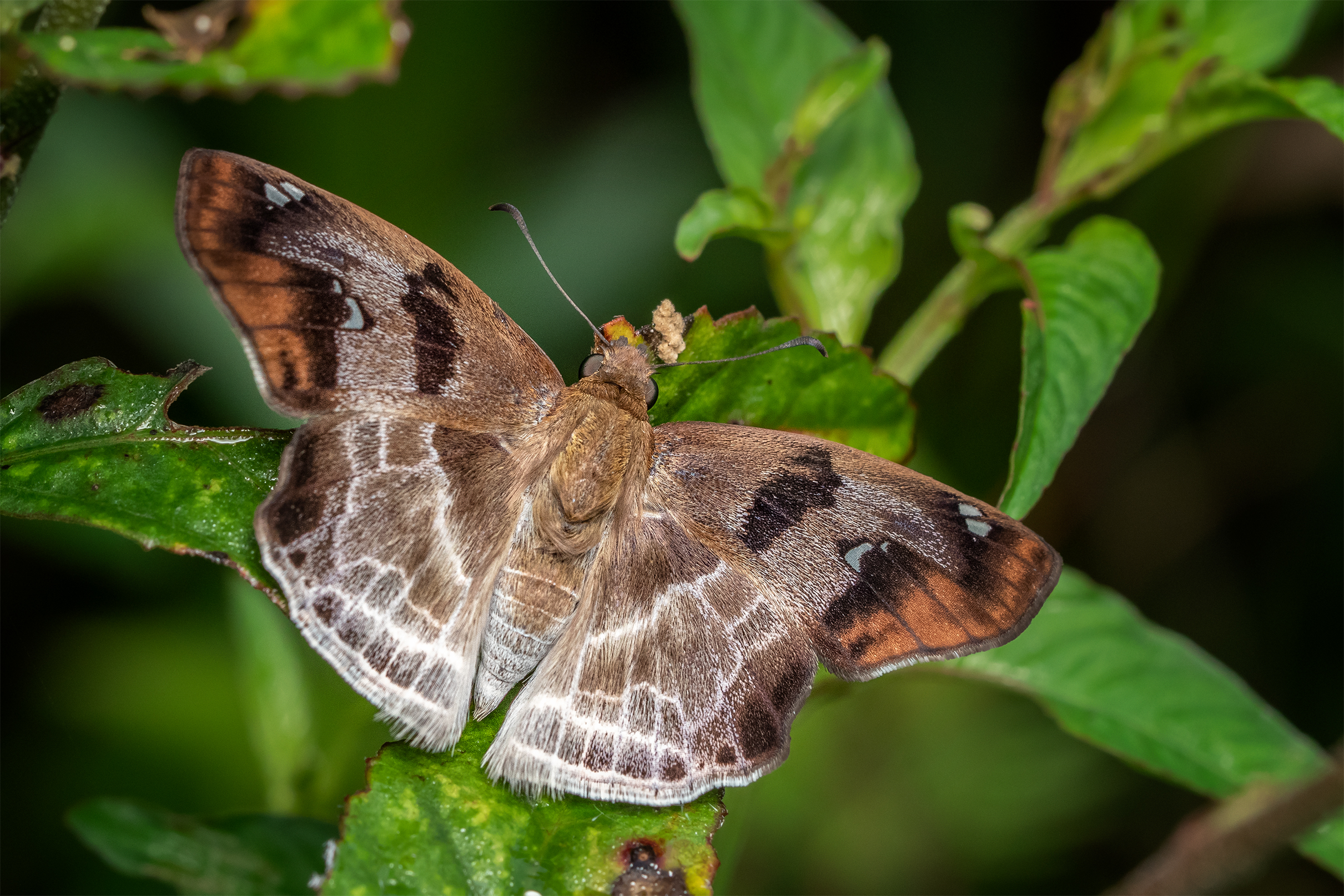
- At Namdapha National Park, Arunachal Pradesh, India

Scientific classification
- Kingdom: Animalia
- Phylum: Arthropoda
- Class: Insecta
- Order: Lepidoptera
- Family: Hesperiidae
- Genus: Abaratha
- Species: A. angulata

Binomial name
- Abaratha angulata (C. Felder, 1862)

Synonyms
- Achlyodes sura Moore, 1865 Odontoptilum angulata

= Abaratha angulata =

Chestnut angle

Species of butterfly

Abaratha angulata, the chestnut angle or banded angle, is a butterfly belonging to the family Hesperiidae and is found in India and southeast Asia.

== Description ==
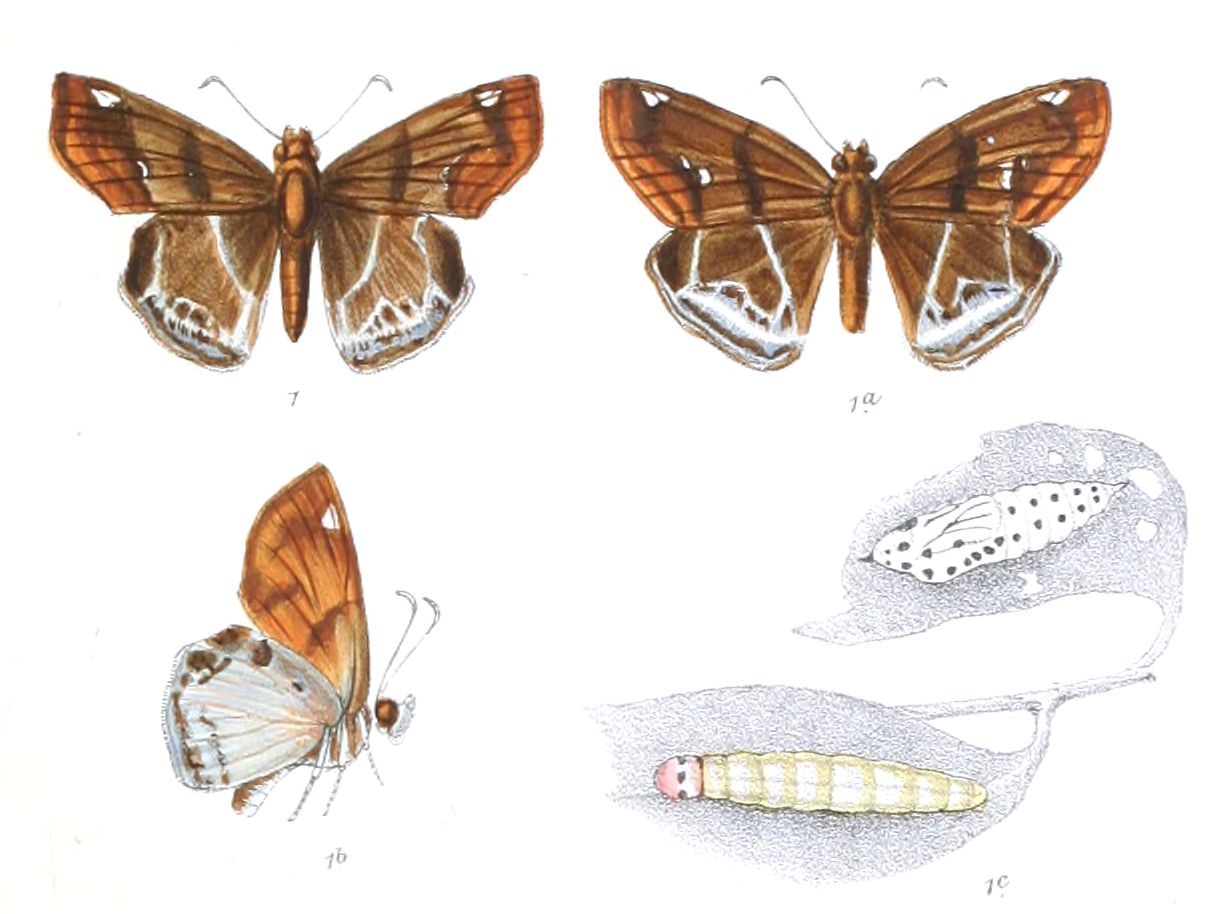

Male and female vinaceous-brown, palest on the hindwing. Male, forewing dull chestnut-brown along exterior margin, with a black transverse band one-third from the base; a geminated semi-transparent spot on costa before the apex, surrounded by suffused black; a semi-transparent lunule and a small spot on the lower part of the disc, bordered without by a black band: hindwing with a transverse subbasal, an elbowed discal, and a lower submarginal purplish-white line; apex of wing with suffused black patch and lower marginal blackish pale-bordered spots. Underside brown, forewing suffused with greyish-white at the base; markings as above: hindwing greyish-white, the transverse lines less defined, marginal spots blacker, and a blackish spot near base of wing. Palpi above black. Palpi and body beneath and legs greyish-white. Female paler, marked on upper-and undersides as in male.

— E. Y. Watson
