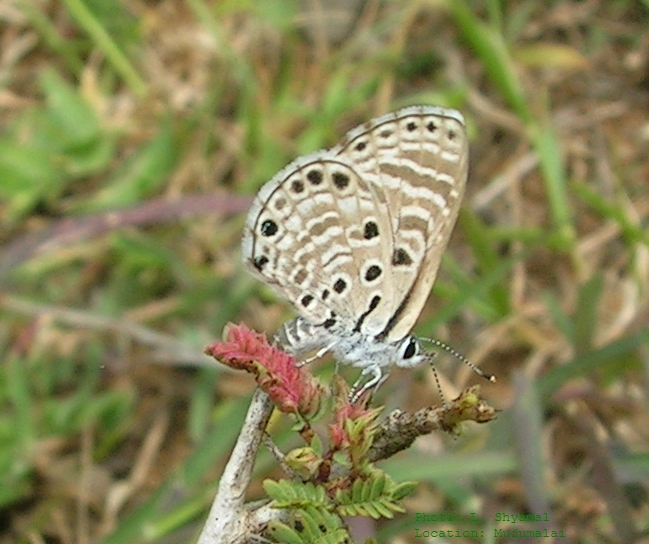
- Azanus jesous

Scientific classification
- Kingdom: Animalia
- Phylum: Arthropoda
- Class: Insecta
- Order: Lepidoptera
- Family: Lycaenidae
- Subfamily: Polyommatinae
- Tribe: Polyommatini
- Genus: Azanus; Moore, [1881]

Synonyms
- Azanisis Kemal, 2004

= Azanus =

Butterfly genus in family Lycaenidae

Azanus, commonly called babul blues, is a genus of butterflies found in Africa and southwestern Asia.

== Taxonomic revisions ==
The subgenus Azanisis (Kemal, 2004) was described in 2004, with Azanus isis designated as its type species. Azanisis is now considered a junior subjective synonym of Azanus (Moore, 1881).

== Species ==
Listed alphabetically:

Image	Scientific name	Common name	Distribution
	Azanus isis (Drury, 1773)	white-banded babul blue	Senegal, Guinea-Bissau, Guinea, Sierra Leone, Liberia, Ivory Coast, Ghana, Togo, southern Nigeria, Cameroon, the Republic of the Congo, Angola, the DRC, Uganda, Ethiopia, north-western Tanzania and northern Zambia
	Azanus jesous (Guérin-Méneville, 1849)	African babul blue or topaz-spotted blue	Egypt, Syria, India, Sri Lanka and Myanmar
	Azanus mirza (Plötz, 1880)	pale babul blue or mirza blue	Afrotropical realm.
	Azanus moriqua (Wallengren, 1857)	black-bordered babul blue or thorn-tree blue	Afrotropical realm.
	Azanus natalensis (Trimen & Bowker, 1887)	Natal babul blue or Natal spotted blue	Afrotropical realm
	Azanus sitalces (Mabille, 1899)	large Madagascar babul blue	Madagascar and the Comoros
	Azanus soalalicus (Karsch, 1900)	small Madagascar babul blue	Madagascar
	Azanus ubaldus (Stoll, [1782])	bright babul blue, desert babul blue, or velvet-spotted blue	India, the Middle East and Africa
	Azanus uranus Butler, 1886	Indian babul blue or dull babul blue	India
	Azanus urios Riley & Godfrey, 1921	Siam babul blue	India and Thailand
