= Siege of Savendroog =

1791 battle of the Third Anglo-Mysore War

- Part of the Third Anglo-Mysore War
Date	2 December – 22 December 1791 (2 weeks, 6 days)
Location	Savendroog
Result	British victory

Belligerents
Sultanate of Mysore	East India Company

Commanders and leaders
Tipu Sultan	(East India Company) General Charles Cornwallis

Units involved
Mysorean Cavalry	British Forces

The Siege of Savendroog (also commonly spelled Sevendroog or Severndroog, but now known as Savandurga) was conducted by British East India Company forces under the command of General Charles Cornwallis in December 1791, during the Third Anglo-Mysore War. The fortress of Savendroog, held by forces of Tipu Sultan, the ruler of Mysore, and thought to be virtually impregnable, was successfully stormed on 22 December 1791, after 20 days of siege.
