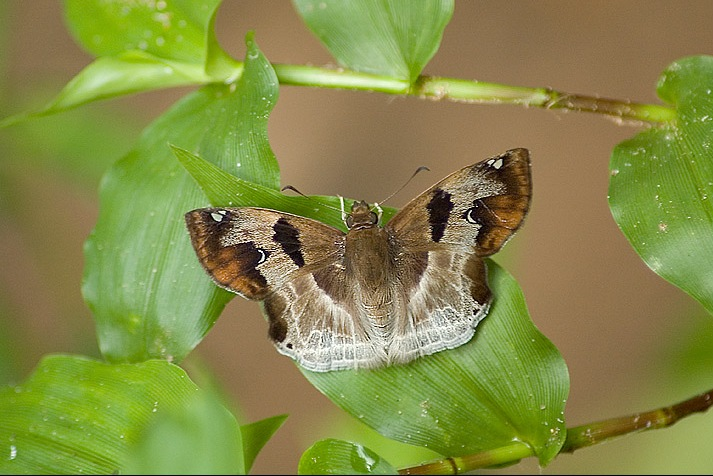
- Abaratha angulata

Scientific classification
- Kingdom: Animalia
- Phylum: Arthropoda
- Class: Insecta
- Order: Lepidoptera
- Family: Hesperiidae
- Tribe: Tagiadini
- Genus: Abaratha; Moore, 1881

= Abaratha =

Genus of butterflies

Abaratha is a genus of spread-winged skippers in the family Hesperiidae. It is found in the Indomalayan realm

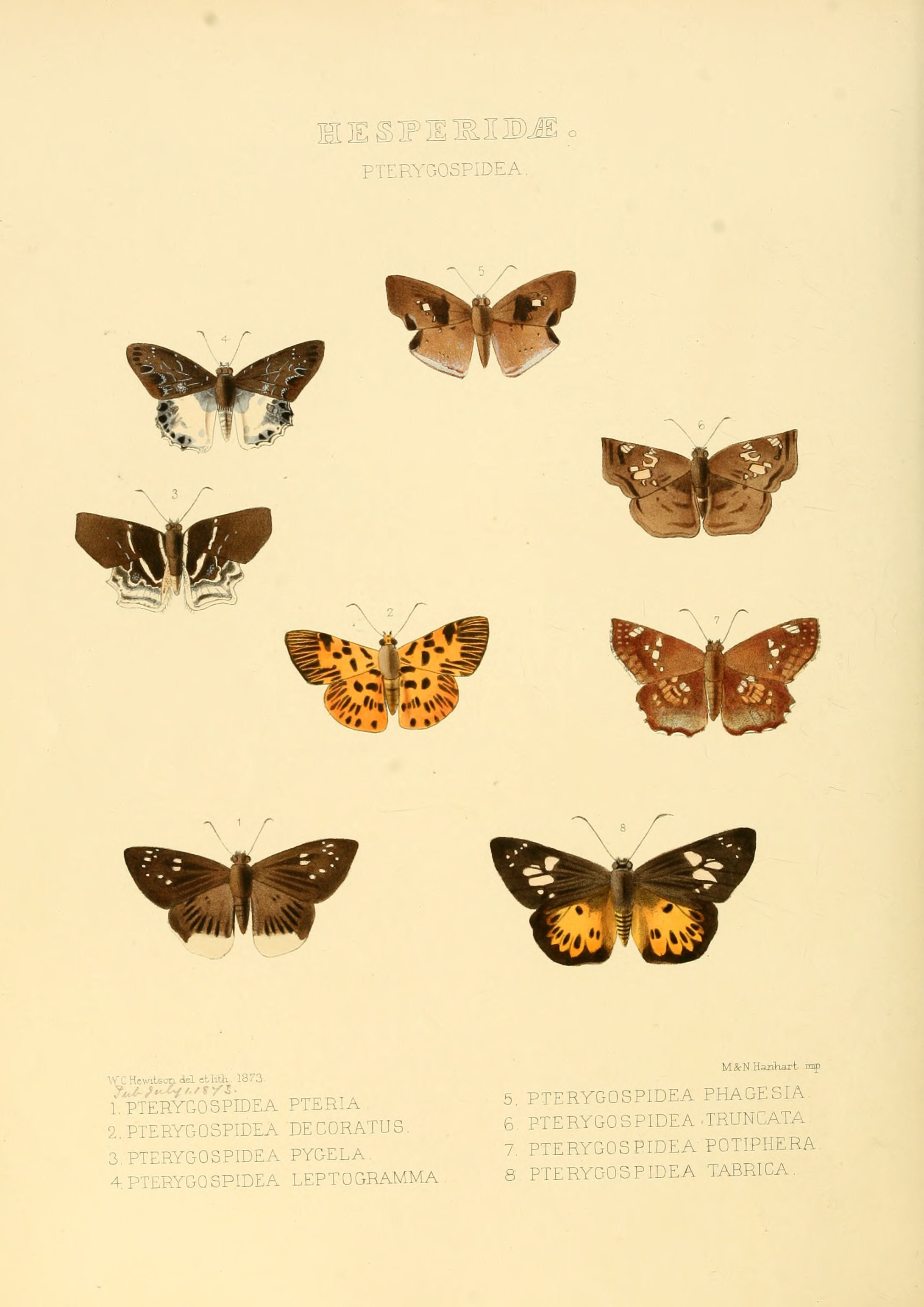
A. pygela and A. leptogramma

== Species ==
- Abaratha abbreviata (de Jong, 2006)
- Abaratha agama (Moore, 1857)
- Abaratha alida (de Nicéville, 1891)
- Abaratha angulata (Felder, 1862)
- Abaratha corria (de Jong, 2006)
- Abaratha helias (Felder & Felder, [1867])
- Abaratha pygela (Hewitson, 1868) Sumatra, Malaya, Burma, Thailand, Borneo, Java, Banka, Nias
- Abaratha leptogramma (Hewitson, 1868) Philippines.
- Abaratha ransonnetii (Felder, 1868)
