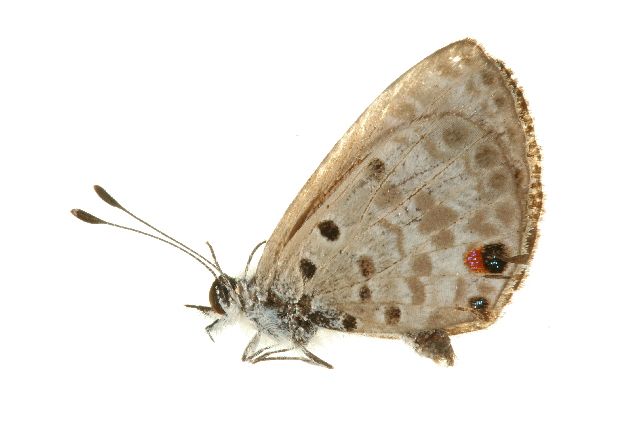

Scientific classification
- Domain: Eukaryota
- Kingdom: Animalia
- Phylum: Arthropoda
- Class: Insecta
- Order: Lepidoptera
- Family: Lycaenidae
- Genus: Azanus
- Species: A. sitalces

Binomial name
- Azanus sitalces (Mabille, 1900)

Synonyms
- Lycaena sitalces Mabille, 1900; Azanus (Azanus) sitalces; Azanus rubropuncta Lathy, 1921

= Azanus sitalces =

Large Madagascar babul blue

Species of butterfly

Azanus sitalces, the large Madagascar babul blue, is a butterfly in the family Lycaenidae. It is found on Madagascar and the Comoros. The habitat consists of forests.

== Subspecies ==
- Azanus sitalces sitalces (Madagascar)
- Azanus sitalces mayotti d'Abrera, 1980 (Comoros: Mayotte)
