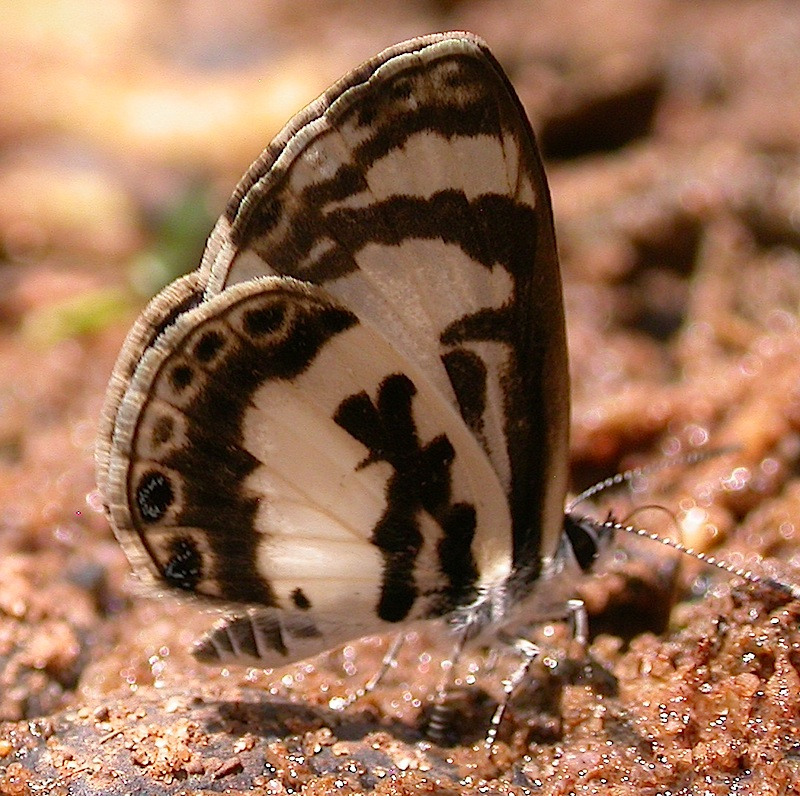
- Niaouli forest in southern Benin
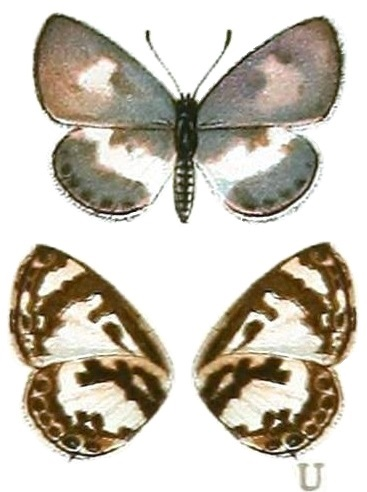

Scientific classification
- Kingdom: Animalia
- Phylum: Arthropoda
- Clade: Pancrustacea
- Class: Insecta
- Order: Lepidoptera
- Family: Lycaenidae
- Genus: Azanus
- Species: A. isis

Binomial name
- Azanus isis (Drury, 1773)

Synonyms
- Papilio isis Drury, 1773; Azanus (Azanisis) isis; Papilio caeruleoalbus Goeze, 1779; Papilio camillus Cramer, 1780; Hesperia isarchus Fabricius, 1793

= Azanus isis =

White-banded babul blue

Species of butterfly

Azanus isis, the white-banded babul blue, is a butterfly in the family Lycaenidae which is native to the tropics and subtropics of sub-Saharan Africa.

== Range and habitat ==
It is found in Senegal, Guinea-Bissau, Guinea, Sierra Leone, Liberia, Ivory Coast, Ghana, Togo, southern Nigeria, Cameroon, the Republic of the Congo, Angola, the DRC, Uganda, Ethiopia, north-western Tanzania and northern Zambia. The habitat consists of forest edges and clearings, woodland and moist savanna.

Torben Larsen developed a species numbering system for his 2005 publication Butterflies of West Africa. This species is #632. The 'Larsen' numbers have since been used with permission in A Sharp Eye on Butterflies of Ghana.

== Taxonomic revisions ==
A. isis was previously designated as a type species in the subgenus Azanisis (Kemal, 2004), which is now considered a junior subjective synonym of Azanus (Moore, 1881).
