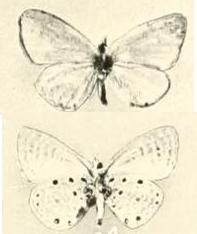

Scientific classification
- Domain: Eukaryota
- Kingdom: Animalia
- Phylum: Arthropoda
- Class: Insecta
- Order: Lepidoptera
- Family: Lycaenidae
- Genus: Azanus
- Species: A. soalalicus

Binomial name
- Azanus soalalicus (Karsch, 1900)

Synonyms
- Cupido soalalicus Karsch, 1900; Azanus (Azanus) soalalicus

= Azanus soalalicus =

Species of butterfly

Azanus soalalicus, the small Madagascar babul blue, is a butterfly in the family Lycaenidae. It is found on Madagascar. The habitat consists of forests.
