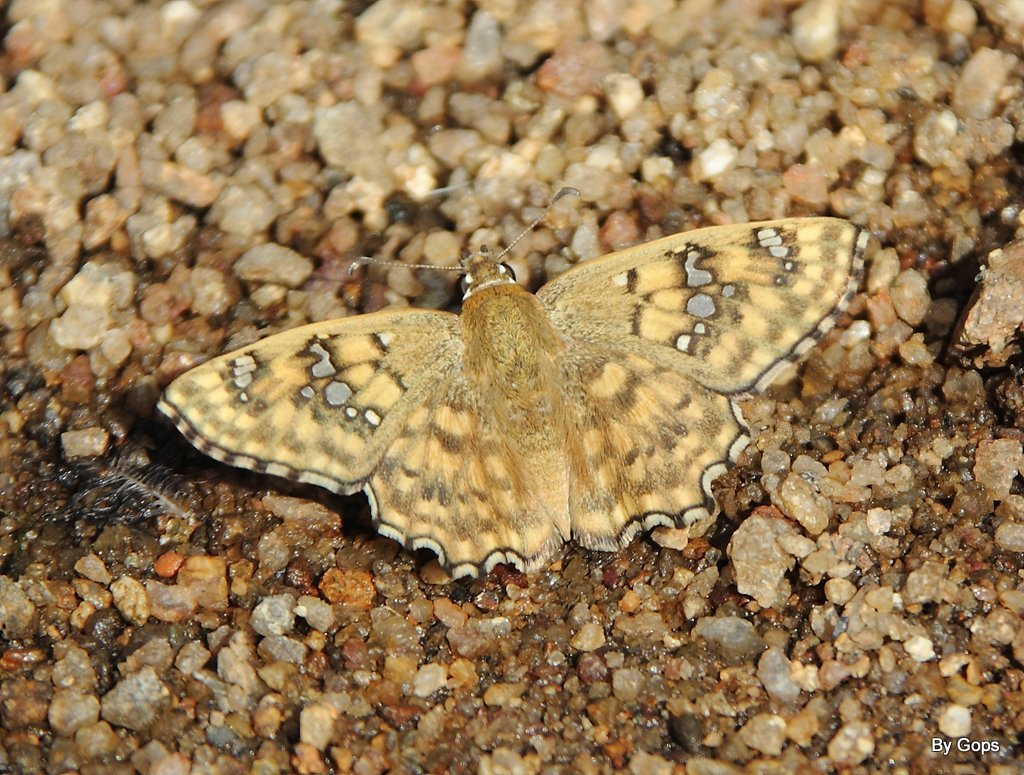
- Abaratha alida vespa
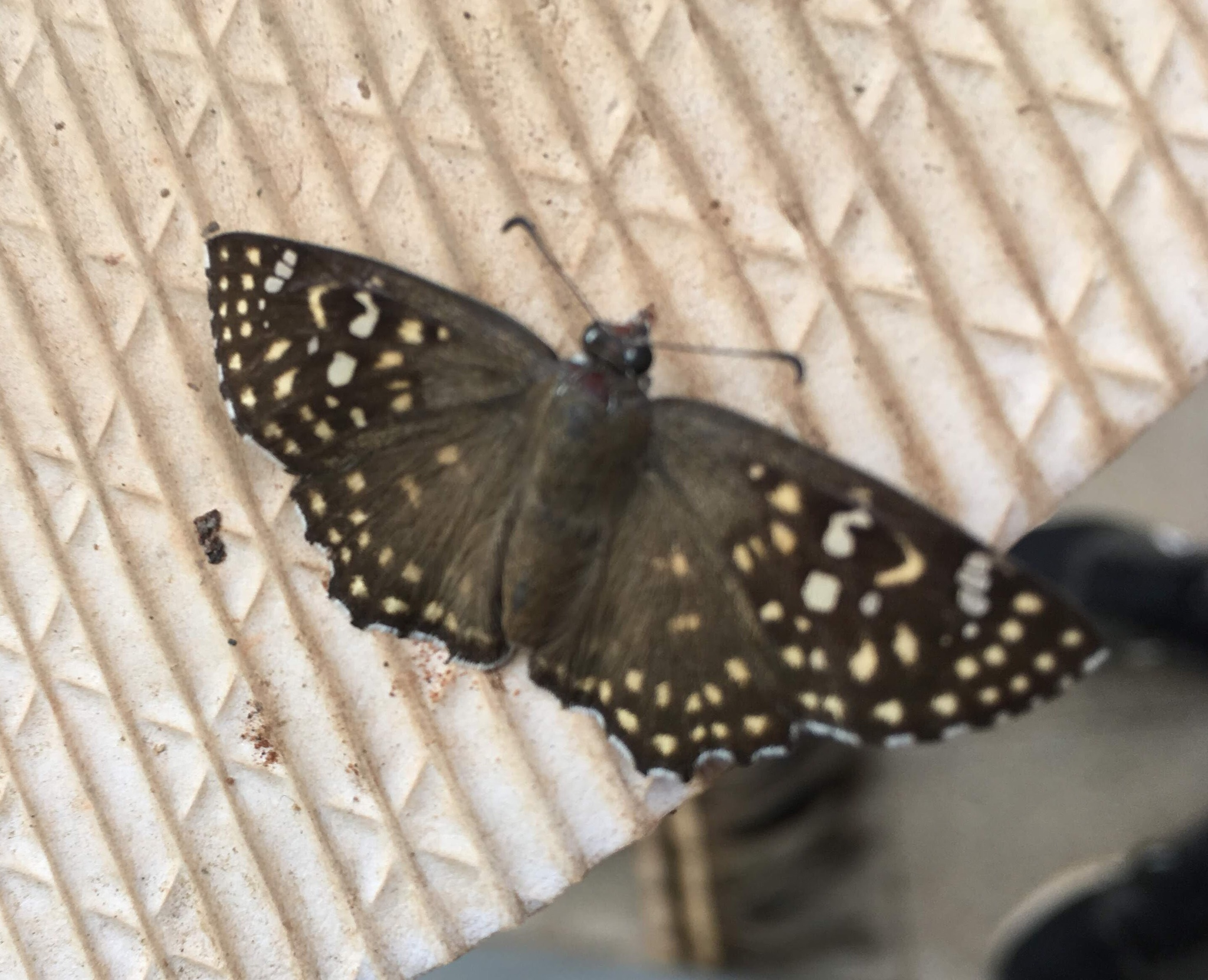
- Abaratha alida alida

Scientific classification
- Kingdom: Animalia
- Phylum: Arthropoda
- Class: Insecta
- Order: Lepidoptera
- Family: Hesperiidae
- Genus: Abaratha
- Species: A. alida

Binomial name
- Abaratha alida de Nicéville, 1891

Synonyms
- Caprona alida (de Nicéville, 1891); Caprona elwesii Watson, 1897; Abaratha parvopunctata Mabille & Boullet, 1917

= Abaratha alida =

Species of butterfly

Abaratha alida, the yellow spotted angle or Alida angle, is a butterfly belonging to the family Hesperiidae. It is found in India, Sri Lanka, Myanmar, Thailand, Vietnam, Laos, Hainan and southern China. It was first described by Lionel de Nicéville in 1891.

== Subspecies ==
The following subspecies are recognised:

- Abaratha alida lanka (Evans, 1932) - Sri Lanka
- Abaratha alida vespa (Evans, 1949) - India
- Abaratha alida yerburyi (Evans, 1949) - Pakistan
- Abaratha alida alida de Nicéville, 1891 - Thailand, northern India, Myanmar, Laos and Vietnam

== Description ==
Male. Upper.side ochreous-brown. Forewing with five sub-apical white spots, the three from near the costa in an outwardly oblique straight line, the two lower ones minute, sometimes absent; a small round dot within the cell before its middle, a spot within the outer end, highly excavated on its outer side, its upper half merely a short curved streak, a round spot in the middle of the first median interspace, a round dot outside towards the base of the second median interspace, a minute dot immediately below the lower spot and a small round spot inwardly below it, both in the interno-median interspace, a very minute dot close to the costa at its middle, all the spots and dots white and semi-hyaline; an indistinct brown narrow bar before the middle across the interno-median interspace; and an indistinct, irregular, recurved brown lunular discal line. Hindwing with indistinct, lunular, brown, discal and sub-marginal lines; both wings with brown outer marginal line and white cilia, with small brown patches at the vein ends. Underside pale brown, spots and markings as above, both wings covered and smeared with white scaling, the outer marginal line brown, with a little brown suffusion on its inner side. Antennae with the underside of the upper half of the club ochreous, a white streak on the lower half, the shaft with white dots. Palpi, body beneath and the legs white; head and body above concolorous with the wings, a white spot on each side of the head. Female similar to the male, duller in colour above and not nearly so white beneath, and across the disc of the forewing beneath there is a rather broad, indistinct brownish fascia.

— Charles Swinhoe, Lepidoptera Indica. Vol. X
