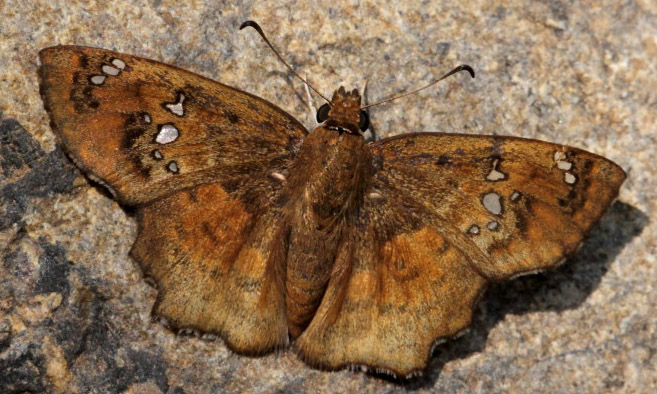
- Dry-season form from Kerala
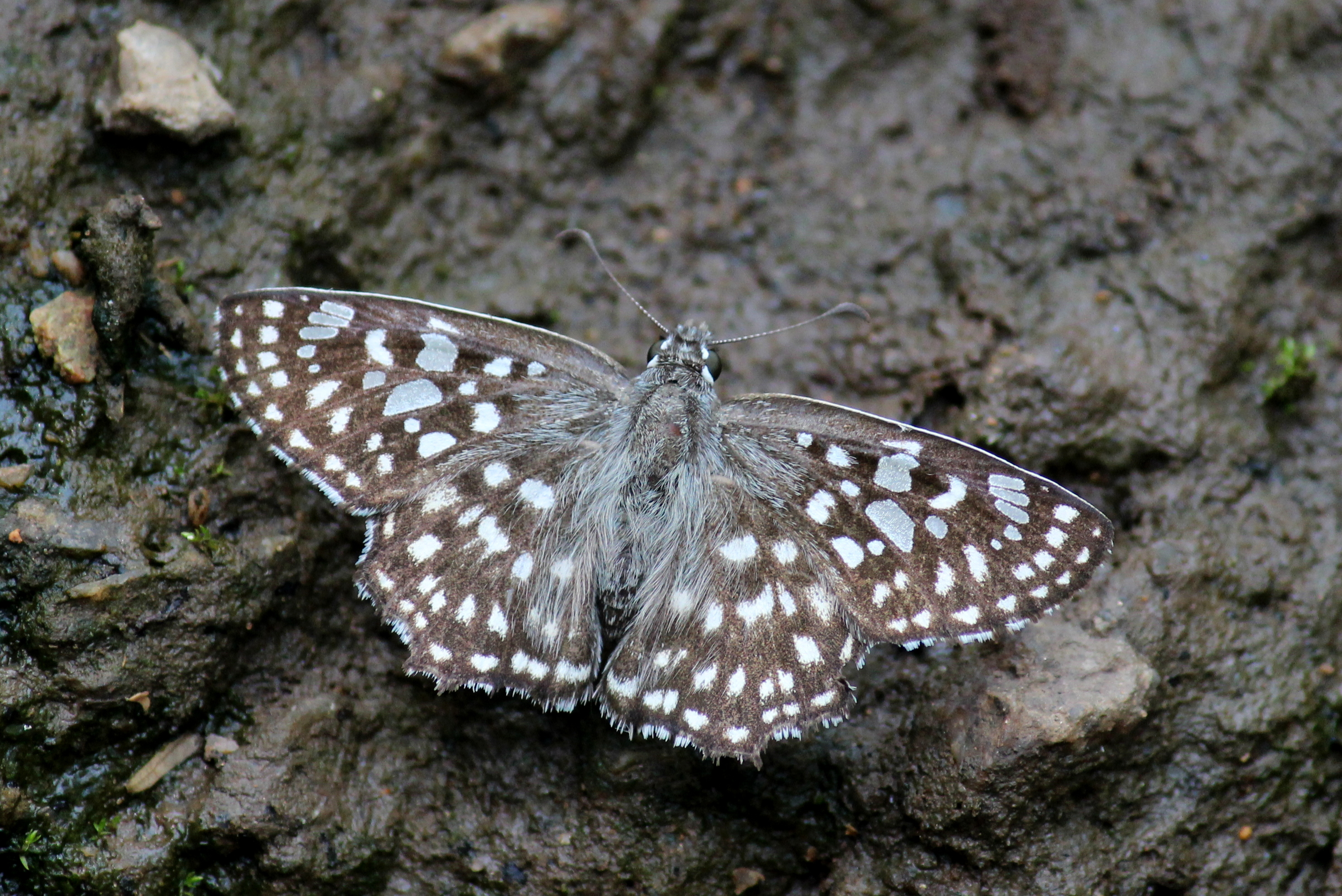
- Wet-season form from Bangalore

Scientific classification
- Kingdom: Animalia
- Phylum: Arthropoda
- Class: Insecta
- Order: Lepidoptera
- Family: Hesperiidae
- Genus: Abaratha
- Species: A. agama

Binomial name
- Abaratha agama (Moore, 1857)

Synonyms
- List: Pyrgus agama Moore, [1858]; Pterygospidea erosula C. & R. Felder, [1867]; Pterygospidea syrichthus C. & R. Felder, [1867]; Tagiades danae Plötz, 1884; Abantis agama (Moore, 1857); Abaratha saraya Doherty, 1886; Abaratha siamica Swinhoe, 1907; Caprona agama (Moore, 1857); Caprona pelias Fruhstorfer, 1909; Caprona pelligera Fruhstorfer, 1909; Caprona mettasuta Fruhstorfer, 1909

= Abaratha agama =

Spotted angle

Species of butterfly

Abaratha agama, the spotted angle, is a species of butterfly belonging to the family Hesperiidae. It is found from southern India to Myanmar and in Thailand, Laos, Vietnam, southern China, Java and Sulawesi. The species was first described by Frederic Moore in 1857.

== Description ==
Male. Upperside dark blackish-grey covered with white spots. Forewing with four spots in the cell, commencing with a dot before the middle, a spot in the middle, another towards the end, constricted in its middle, with a dot above it and a lunule at the end, the last two having rows of spots below them, one in each interspace, except the interuo-median which has two in each row; three conjugated spots where the sub-apical spots usually are, with the two dots below them, a post-discal series of spots composed of eight spots, the four lower ones in a row a little inwards, the lower two small, and a sub-marginal row of small spots. Hindwing with a small spot in the middle of the cell, a lunule at the end, the latter the centre of a middle row of small spots, a post-discal and a sub-marginal row; the cilia of both wings black, with white spots opposite the sub-marginal spots. Underside. Forewing white, all but the lower basal portion suffused more or less with blackish-grey, the spots as above. Hindwing white, without suffusion, the spots round and black, one at the end of the cell, another above it below the costa, a twin spot below it, towards the base of the interno-median interspace, a discal row of spots, those in the middle smaller than the others, and a sub-marginal row of larger spots; marginal line of both wings black; palpi, body below and the legs white, the long tuft of hairs on the base of foreleg black; head and body above blackish-grey, a white spot on each side of the head. Antennae with a white streak on the club, and white dots on the shaft. Female similar to the male.

— Charles Swinhoe, Lepidoptera Indica Vol. X
