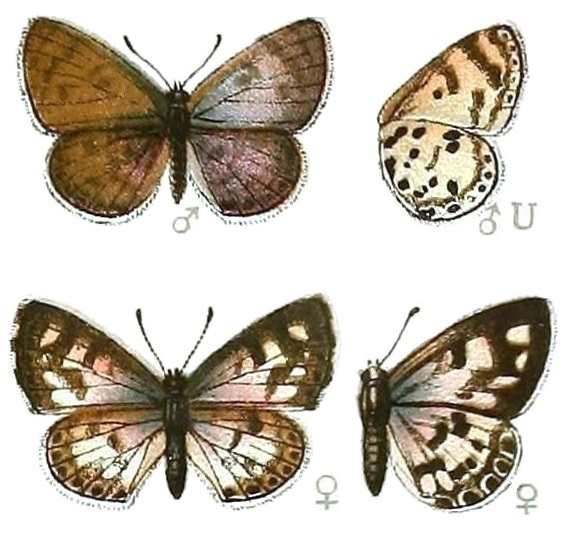

Scientific classification
- Domain: Eukaryota
- Kingdom: Animalia
- Phylum: Arthropoda
- Class: Insecta
- Order: Lepidoptera
- Family: Lycaenidae
- Genus: Azanus
- Species: A. natalensis

Binomial name
- Azanus natalensis (Trimen & Bowker, 1887)

Synonyms
- Lycaena natalensis Trimen & Bowker, 1887

= Azanus natalensis =

Natal babul blue

Species of butterfly

Azanus natalensis, the Natal babul blue or Natal spotted blue, is a butterfly of the family Lycaenidae. It is found in the Afrotropical realm.

== Description and habits ==
The wingspan is 23–27 mm in males and 24–30 mm in females. Its flight period is year-round but mainly between September and May. The larvae feed on Acacia species.

== Gallery ==
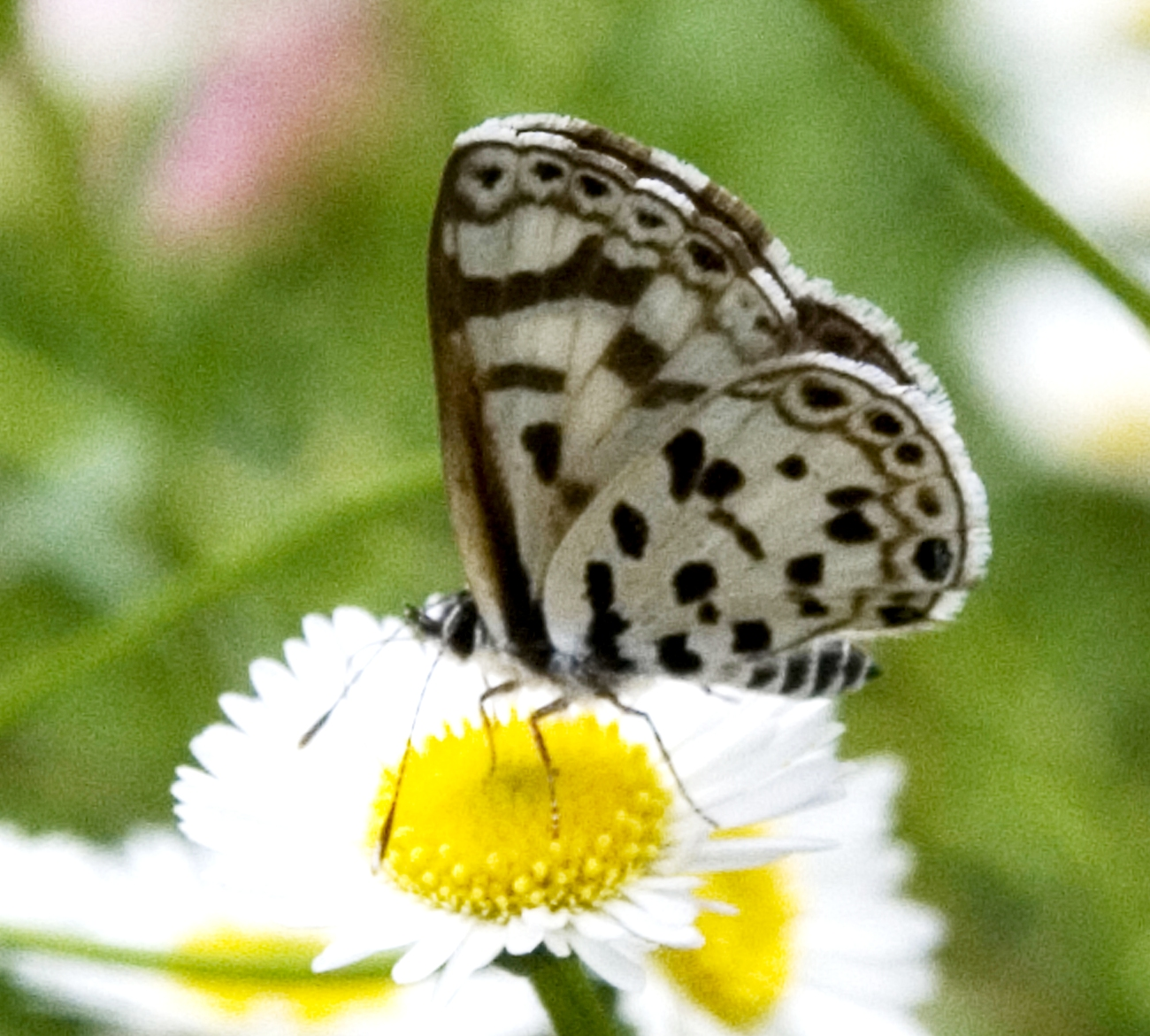

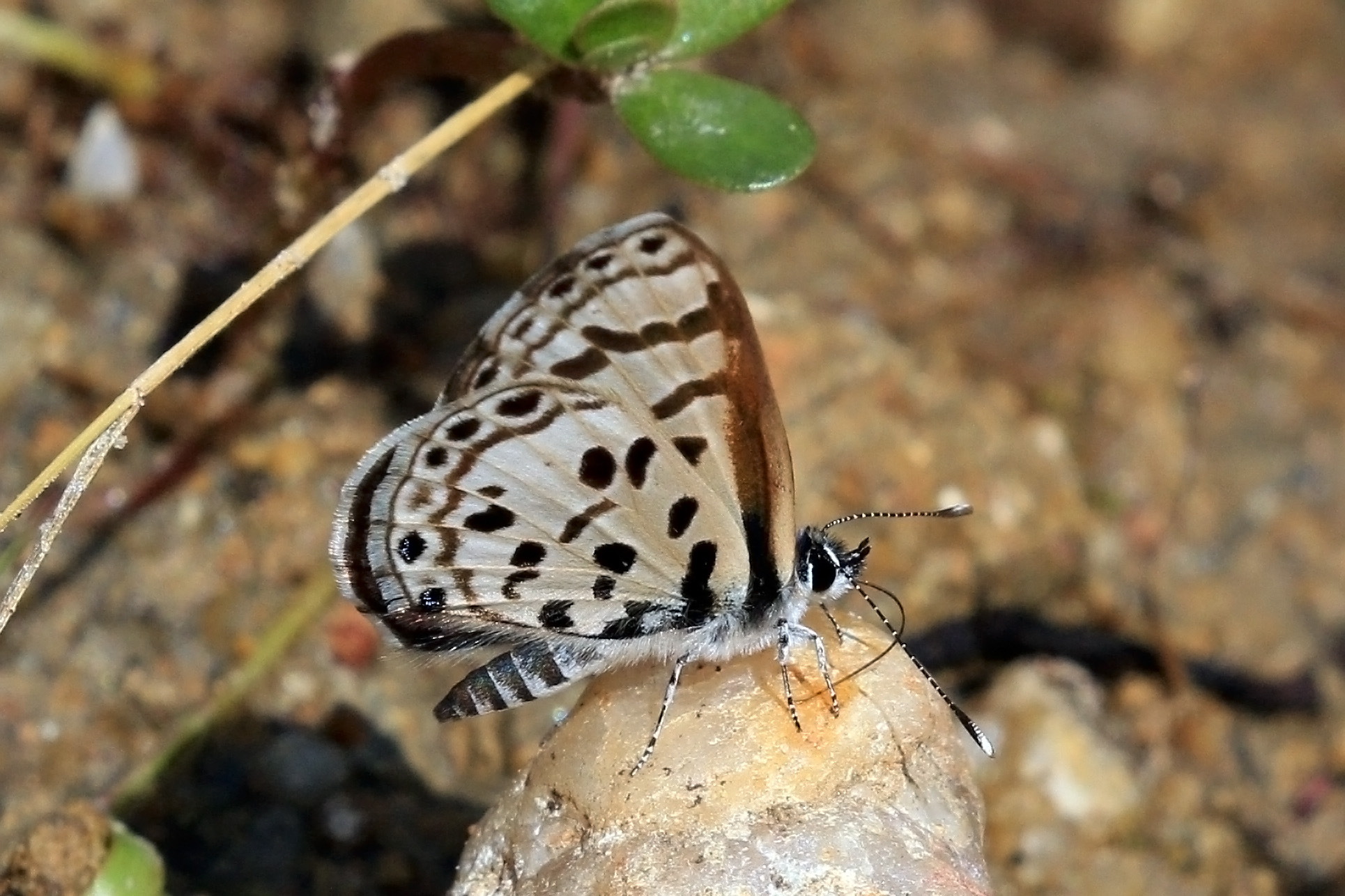
At Queen Elizabeth N. P., Uganda

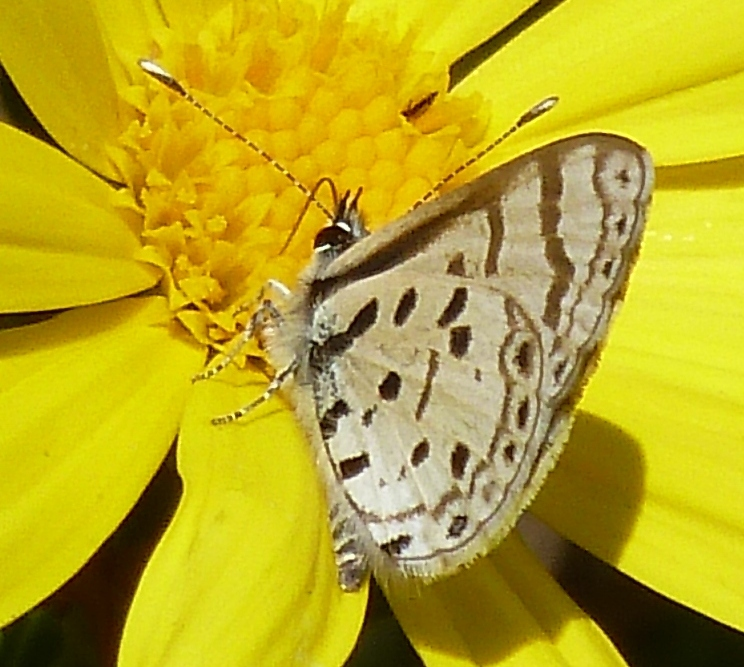
In South Africa
