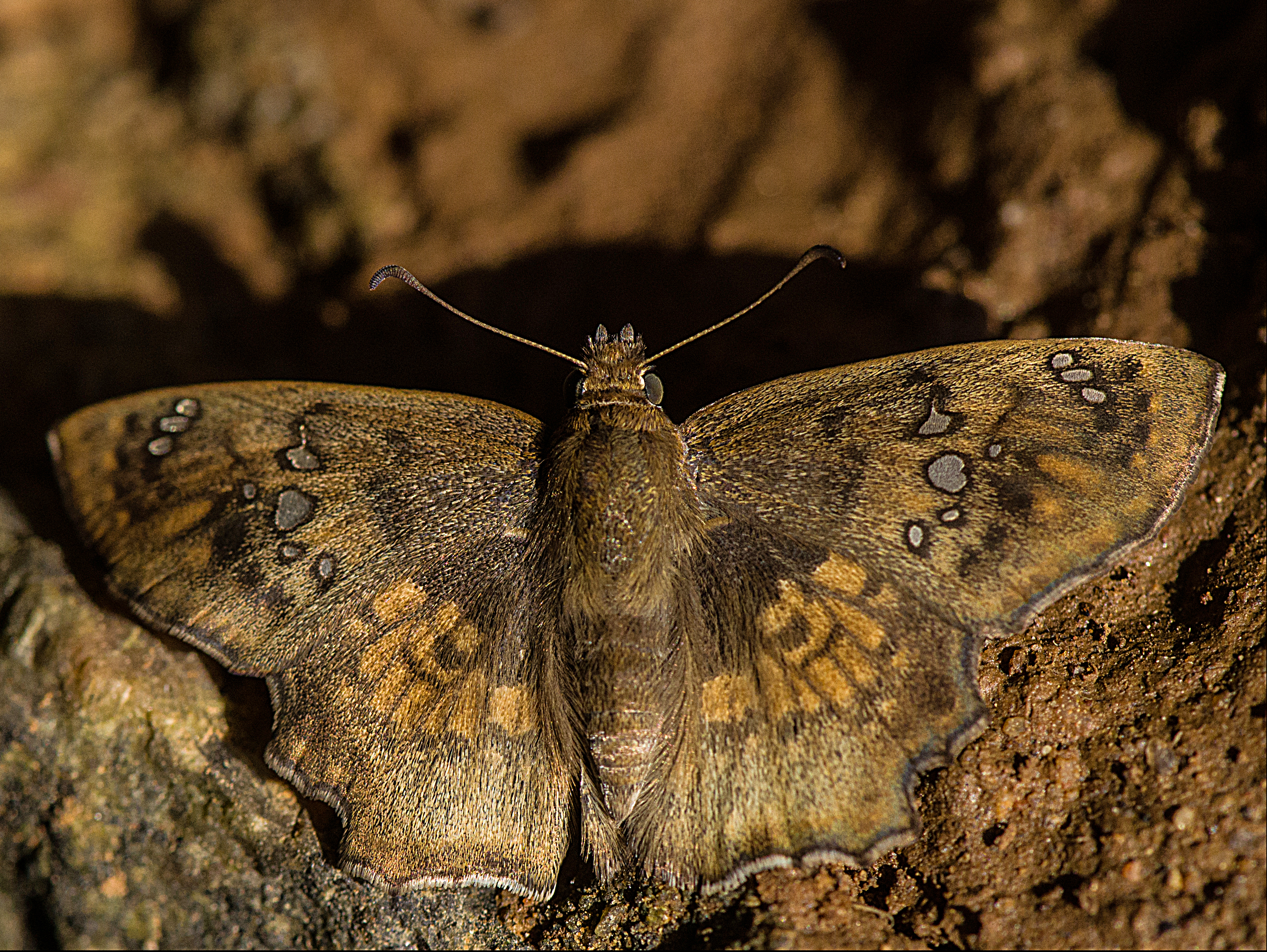
- Wet-season form

Scientific classification
- Domain: Eukaryota
- Kingdom: Animalia
- Phylum: Arthropoda
- Class: Insecta
- Order: Lepidoptera
- Family: Hesperiidae
- Genus: Abaratha
- Species: A. ransonnetii

Binomial name
- Abaratha ransonnetii (C. Felder, 1868)

Synonyms
- Pterygospidea ransonnetii Felder, 1868; Abaratha ransonneti Moore, [1881]; Caprona ransonnetii (Felder, 1868); Caprona ransonnetti (Felder, 1868) [lapsus]

= Abaratha ransonnetii =

Golden angle

Species of butterfly

Abaratha ransonnetii, commonly known as the golden angle, is a butterfly belonging to the family Hesperiidae. It was first described by Baron Cajetan von Felder in 1868.

== Subspecies ==
The following subspecies are recognised:

- Abaratha ransonnetii potiphera Hewitson, 1873 (India)
- Abaratha ransonnetii ransonnetii (Sri Lanka)

== Range ==
It occurs in India (Gujarat, Jharkhand, Odisha and southwards to Kerala) and Sri Lanka.

== Description ==
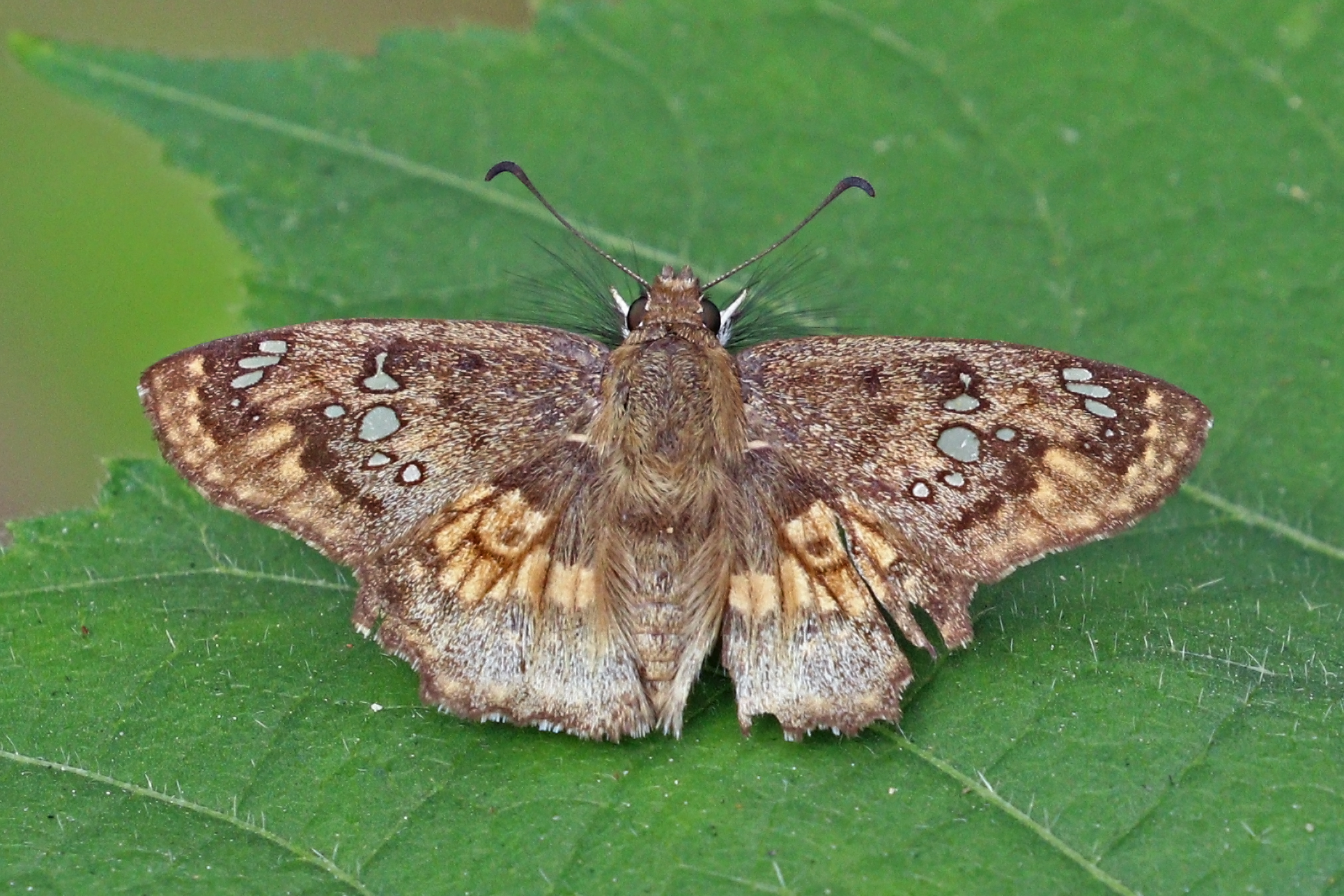
Showing hairs beneath head

In 1891, Edward Yerbury Watson gave this detailed description:

Upperside fuliginous ochreous-brown. Male; forewing with three small semi-transparent white spots before the apex (and sometimes one or two very minute spots obliquely below them), two spots within end of the cell, a slender spot between the upper and middle median veins, a larger spot between the latter vein and submedian, and followed below it by two small obliquely disposed spots; a marginal double row of pale indistinct small lunules; hindwing with a broad medial discal macular pale ochreous band traversed by brown veins and a spot within end of the cell, the outer discal area suffused with grey-brown. Cilia alternated with white. Female; forewing with the spots and marginal lunules, and the macular band on hindwing more prominent, the latter also more distinctly bordered with grey. Underside: forewing paler brown; the basal area greyish-white, the spots with clouded black outer borders; hindwing greyish-white, the outer margin only being brown, traversed by a curved discal series of small blackish spots.

The dry-season form which has been named A. taylorii by de Niceville differs in being ochreous not dark brown above, and in having the disc of the hindwing unmarked with a group of ochreous spots and streaks. A similar variation has been noted by Mr. de Niceville in C. tissa, a not very distantly allied species, and in both cases it is the dry-season form which is the paler.

— E.Y. Watson

== Gallery ==
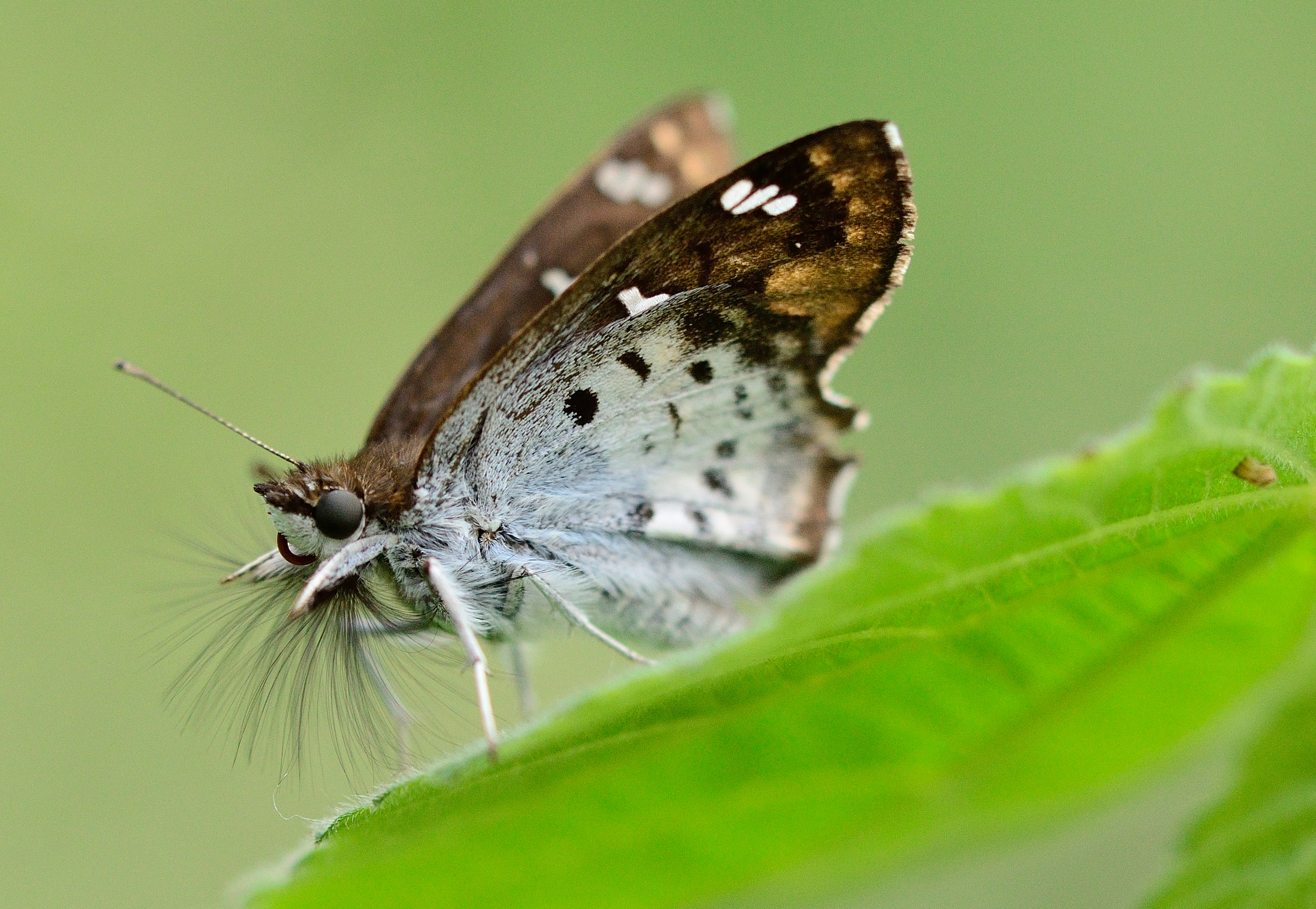
Closed wing position

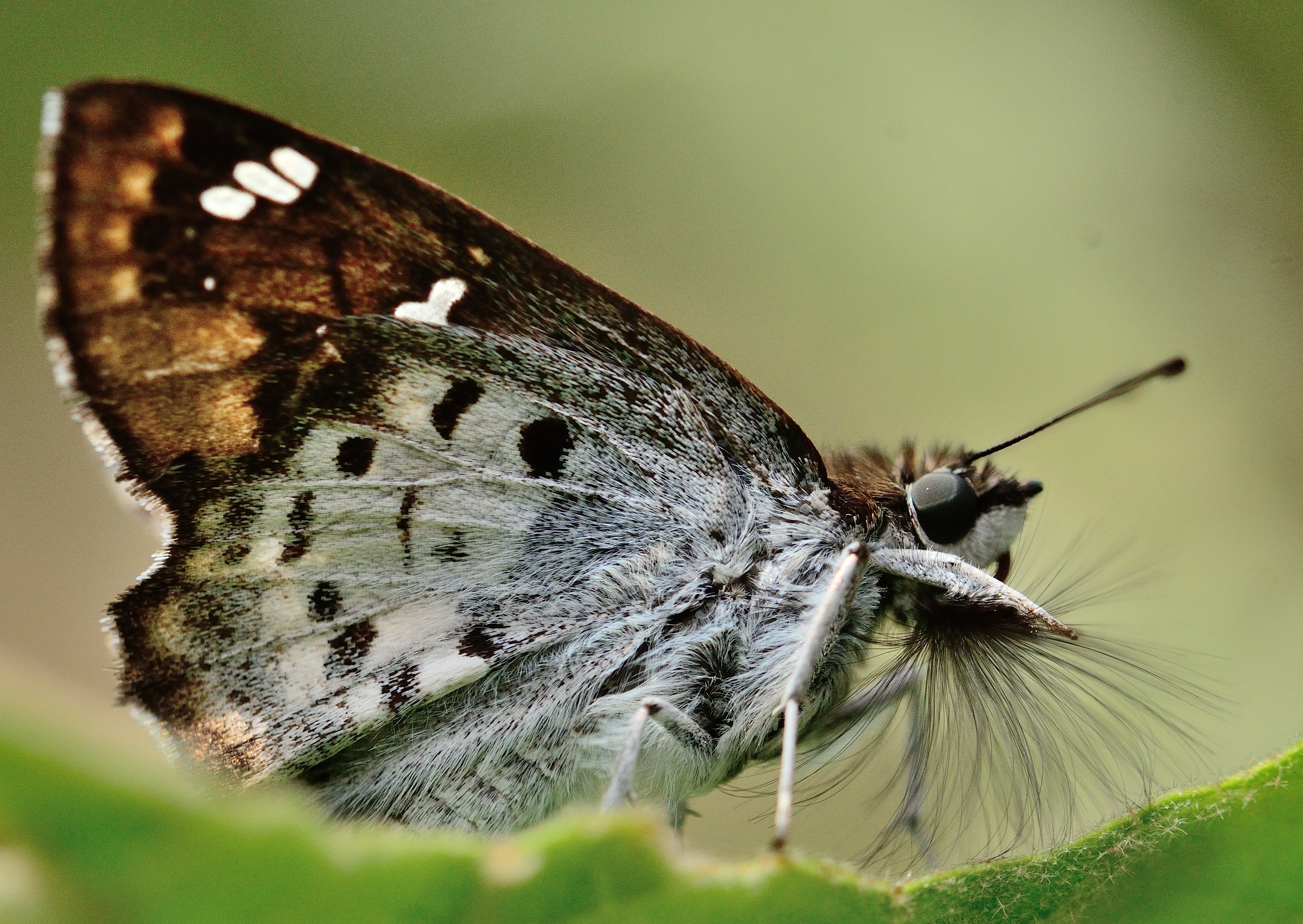
Closed wing position
