= Azanus urios =

Siam babul blue

Scientific classification
- Kingdom: Animalia
- Phylum: Arthropoda
- Class: Insecta
- Order: Lepidoptera
- Family: Lycaenidae
- Genus: Azanus
- Species: A. urios

Binomial name
- Azanus urios Riley & Godfrey, 1921

Species of butterfly

Azanus urios, the Siam babul blue, is a small butterfly found in India and Thailand that belongs to the lycaenids or blues family.

== See also ==
- List of butterflies of India
- List of butterflies of India (Lycaenidae)
