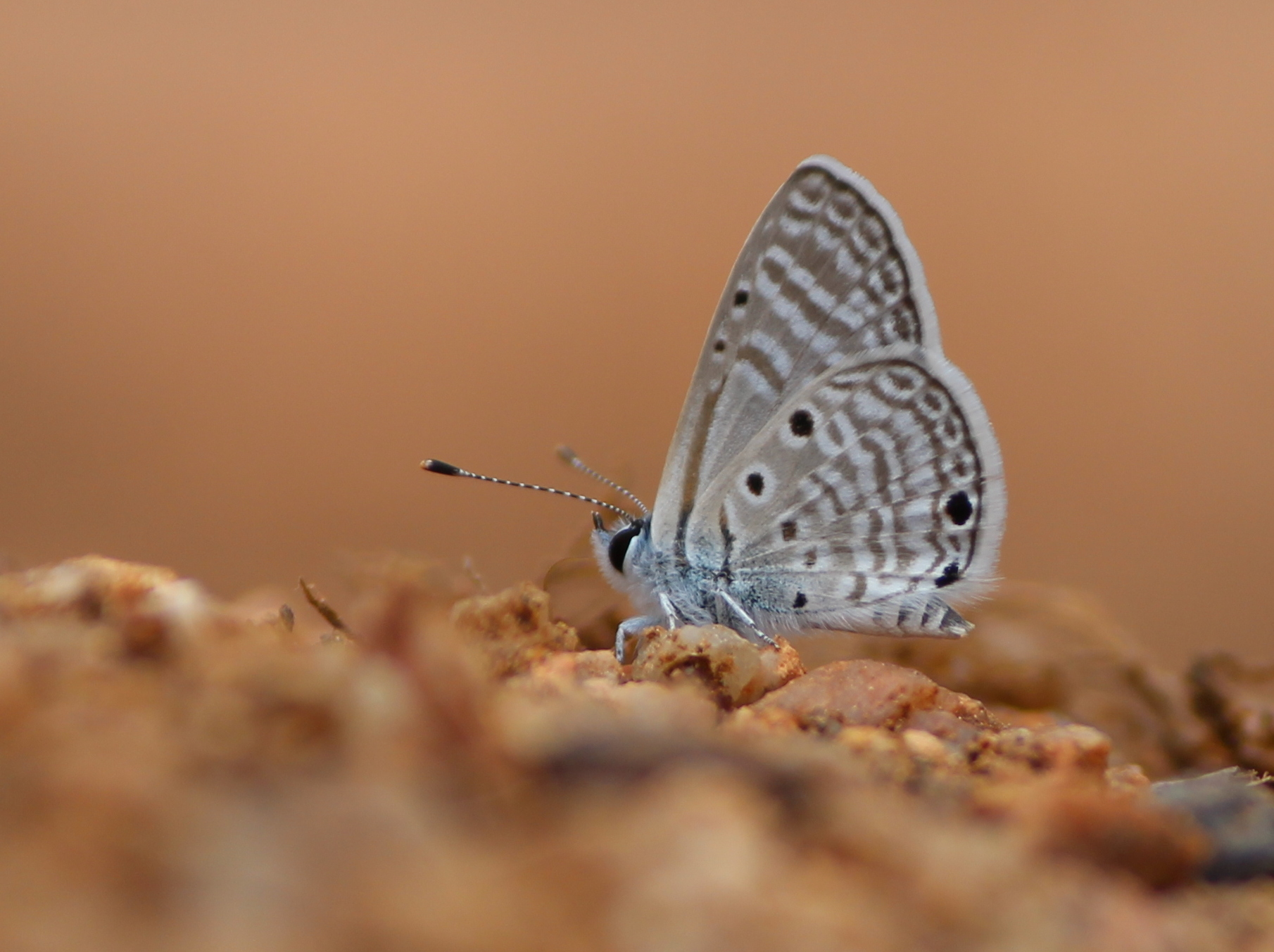
- At Bangalore, India

Conservation status
- Least Concern (IUCN 3.1)

Scientific classification
- Kingdom: Animalia
- Phylum: Arthropoda
- Clade: Pancrustacea
- Class: Insecta
- Order: Lepidoptera
- Family: Lycaenidae
- Genus: Azanus
- Species: A. ubaldus

Binomial name
- Azanus ubaldus (Stoll, [1782])

Synonyms
- Papilio ubaldus Stoll, [1782]; Lycaena ethoda Walker, 1870; Lycaena itea Walker, 1870; Lycaena macalenga Trimen, 1870; Lycaena thebana Staudinger, 1894

= Azanus ubaldus =

Bright babul blue

Species of butterfly

Azanus ubaldus, the bright babul blue, desert babul blue, or velvet-spotted blue, is a small butterfly found in India, the Middle East and Africa that belongs to the lycaenids or blues family.

== Description ==
Male upperside brownish purple, dark blue at base of wings. Forewing: costa very narrow along its apical half, termen evenly and a little more broadly from apex to tornus, edged with brown; the area on the disc, in the cell and beyond it is covered with hair-like specialized scales and is distinctly darker. Hindwing: similar, the brown edging to the costa much broader; posteriorly in the tornal area there is a dark spot in interspace 1 and another more clearly defined similar spot in interspace 2, both spots merged more or less into the terminal brown edging. Cilia of both forewings and hindwings white, with their basal halves evenly dark brown. Underside: greyish brown. Forewing: two short white lines, one each side of the discocellulars; a minute black subcostal dot above apex of cell, another similar dot a little beyond it; two parallel, obliquely placed, transverse, upper discal white lines, followed by an inner and an outer obliquely placed, irregular, broken, subterminal line also white, the inner one somewhat lunular, and an anteciliary dark line; the posterior third from base of the wing uniform, somewhat paler than the rest. Hindwing: the following black white-encircled spots conspicuous: 4 subbasal spots in transverse order, a subcostal spot in middle of interspace 7, two minute geminate (paired) spots at the tornal angle, and a larger one in interspace 2; two transverse short white lines on either side of the discocellulars as on the forewing; a transverse, curved, catenulated, discal band of white markings, followed by a postdiscal and subterminal series of white lunules and an anteciliary dark line edged inwardly with white. Antennae dark brown, the shafts ringed with white; apex of club also white; head, thorax and abdomen dark brown, the thorax in fresh specimens with a little purplish-blue pubescence; beneath: palpi, thorax, and abdomen white.

Female upperside: rich silky brown. Forewings and hindwings: suffused with purplish blue at base, and with anteciliary black lines. Hindwing: with two black spots at tornal area as in the male. Underside: as in the male but the markings more regular, more evenly and neatly defined, and the white transverse lines on the forewing carried to the dorsal margin. Cilia, antennae, head, thorax and abdomen similar to those of the male, the thorax however, devoid of any bluish pubescence (fine hairs) on the upperside.

Individuals show notable variations in coloration, compared to specimens from other regions of South Africa (e.g Witsand).

Torben Larsen developed a species numbering system for his 2005 publication Butterflies of West Africa. This species is #627. The 'Larsen' numbers have since been used with permission in A Sharp Eye on Butterflies of Ghana.

== Gallery ==
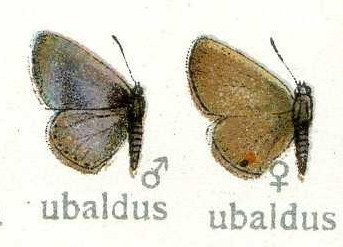
Male left, female right, from Adalbert Seitz

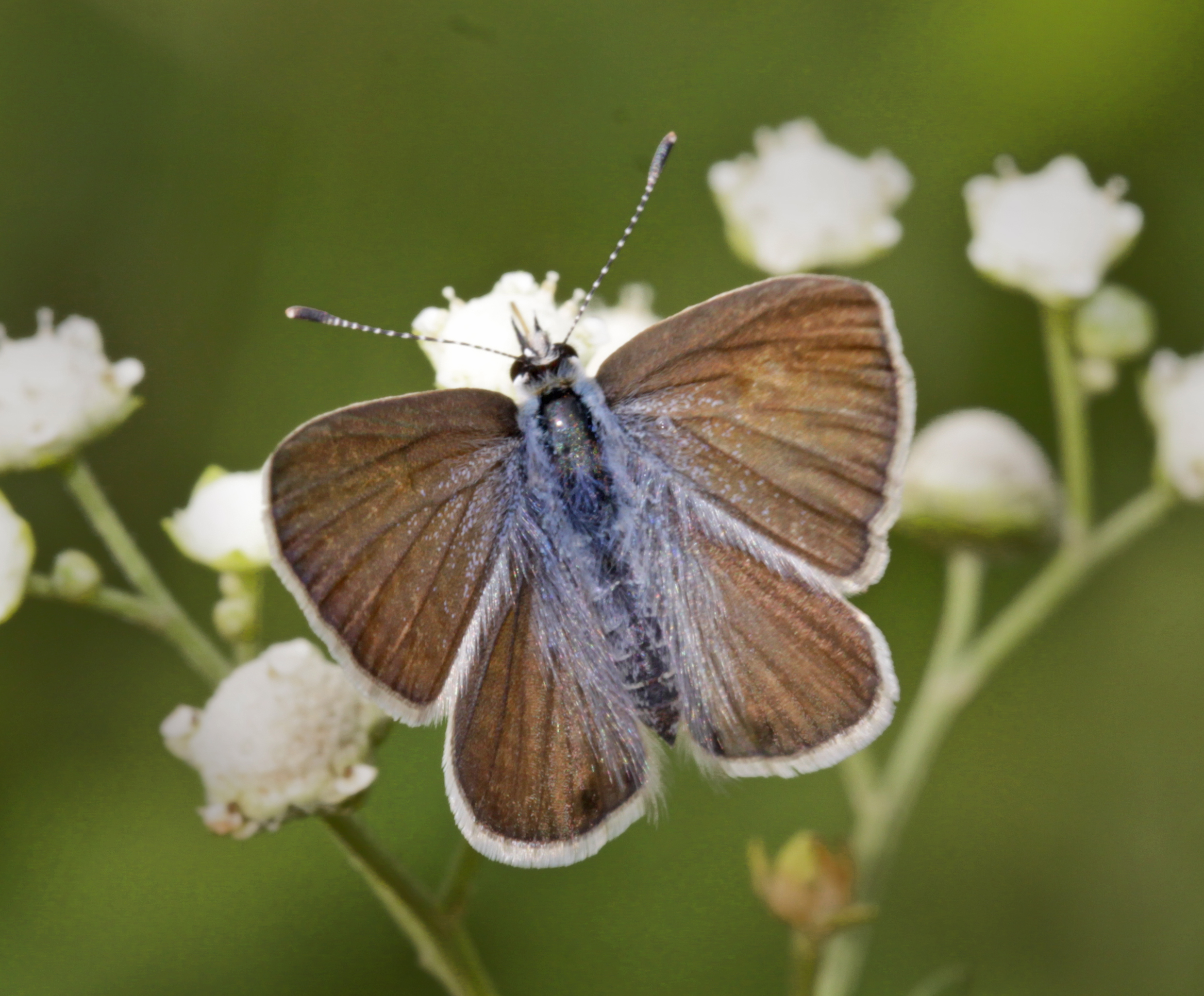
Upper side

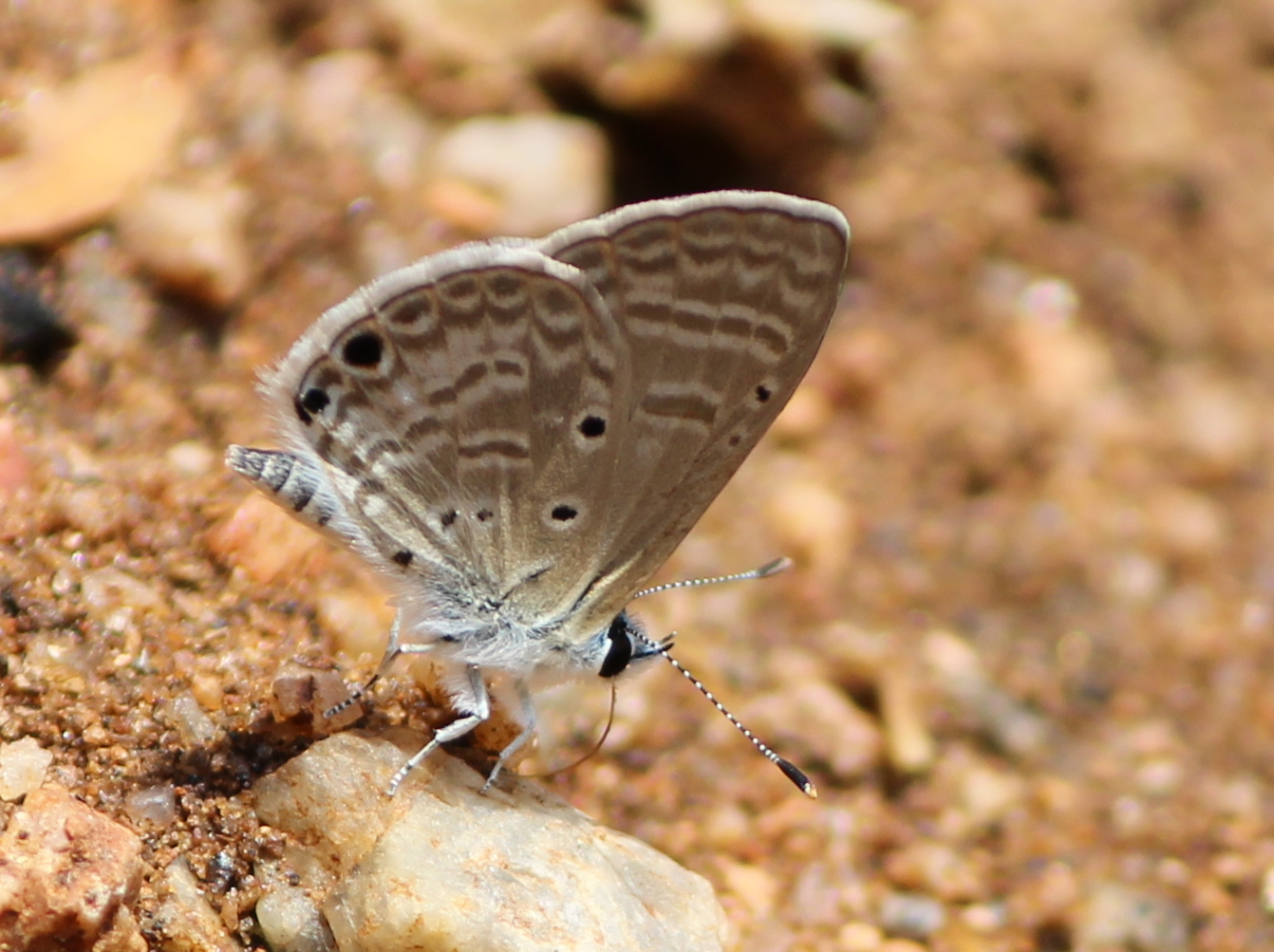
At Savandurga Forest, Magadi, Karnataka, India

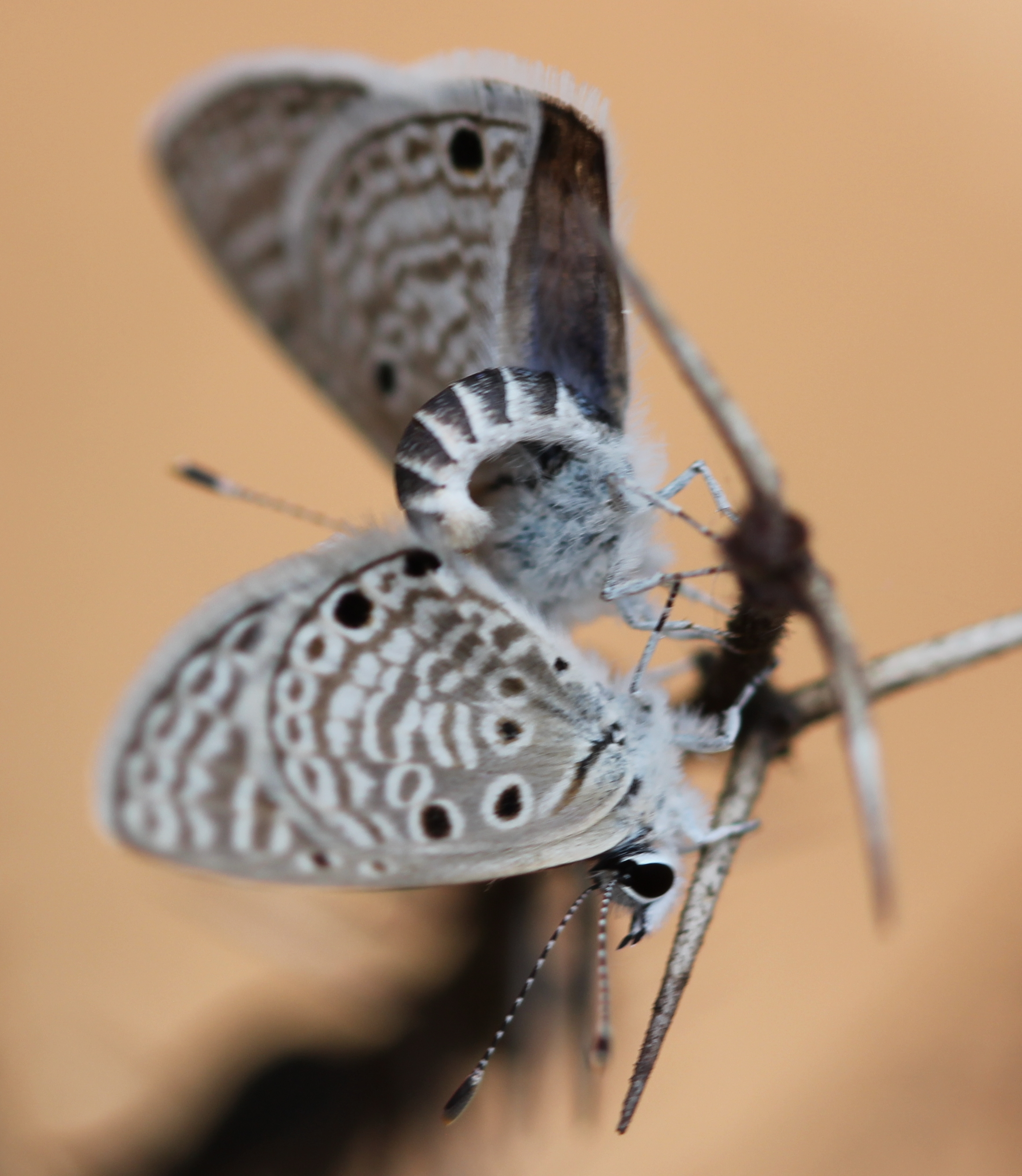
Mating

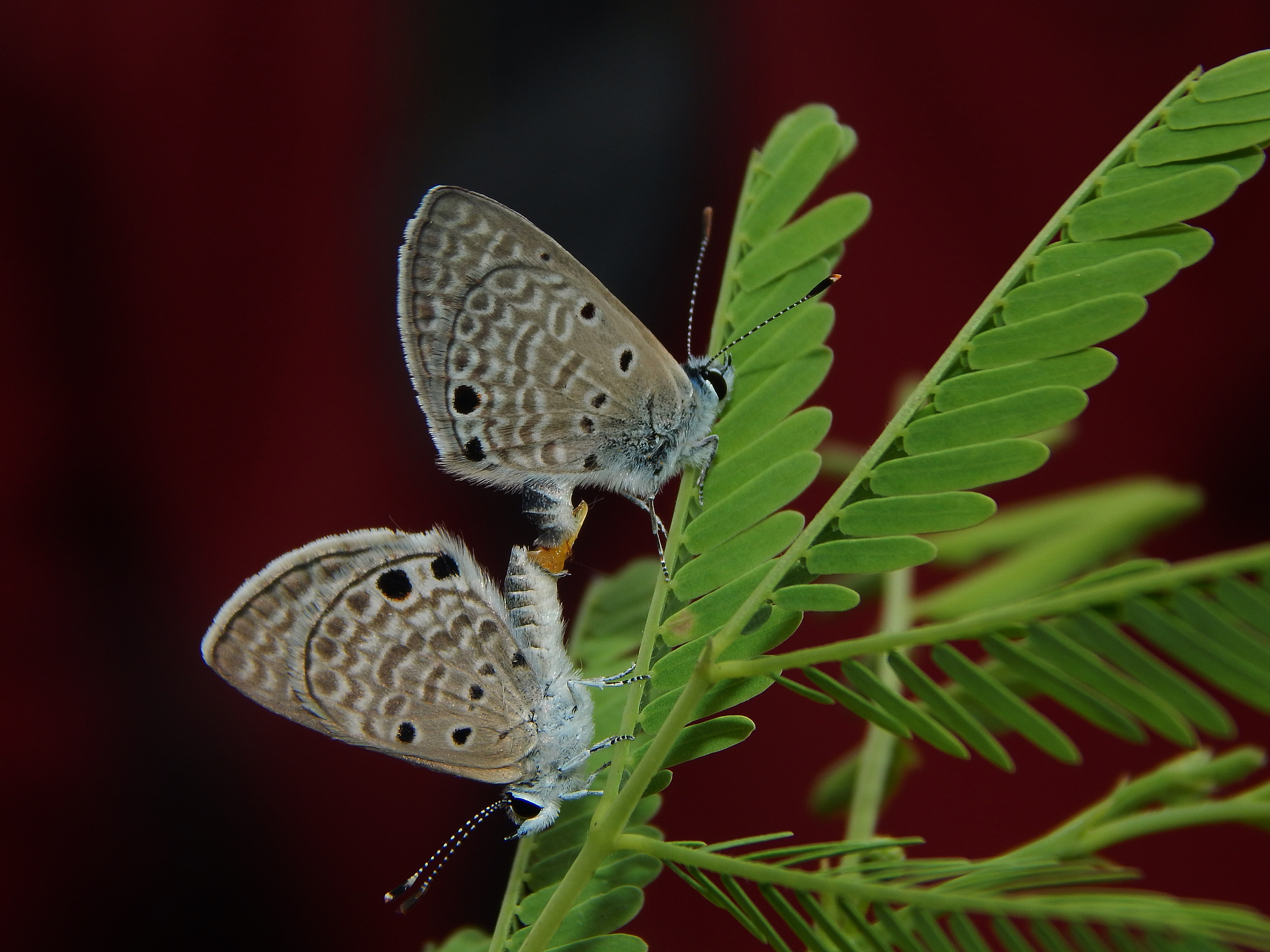
Mating pair
