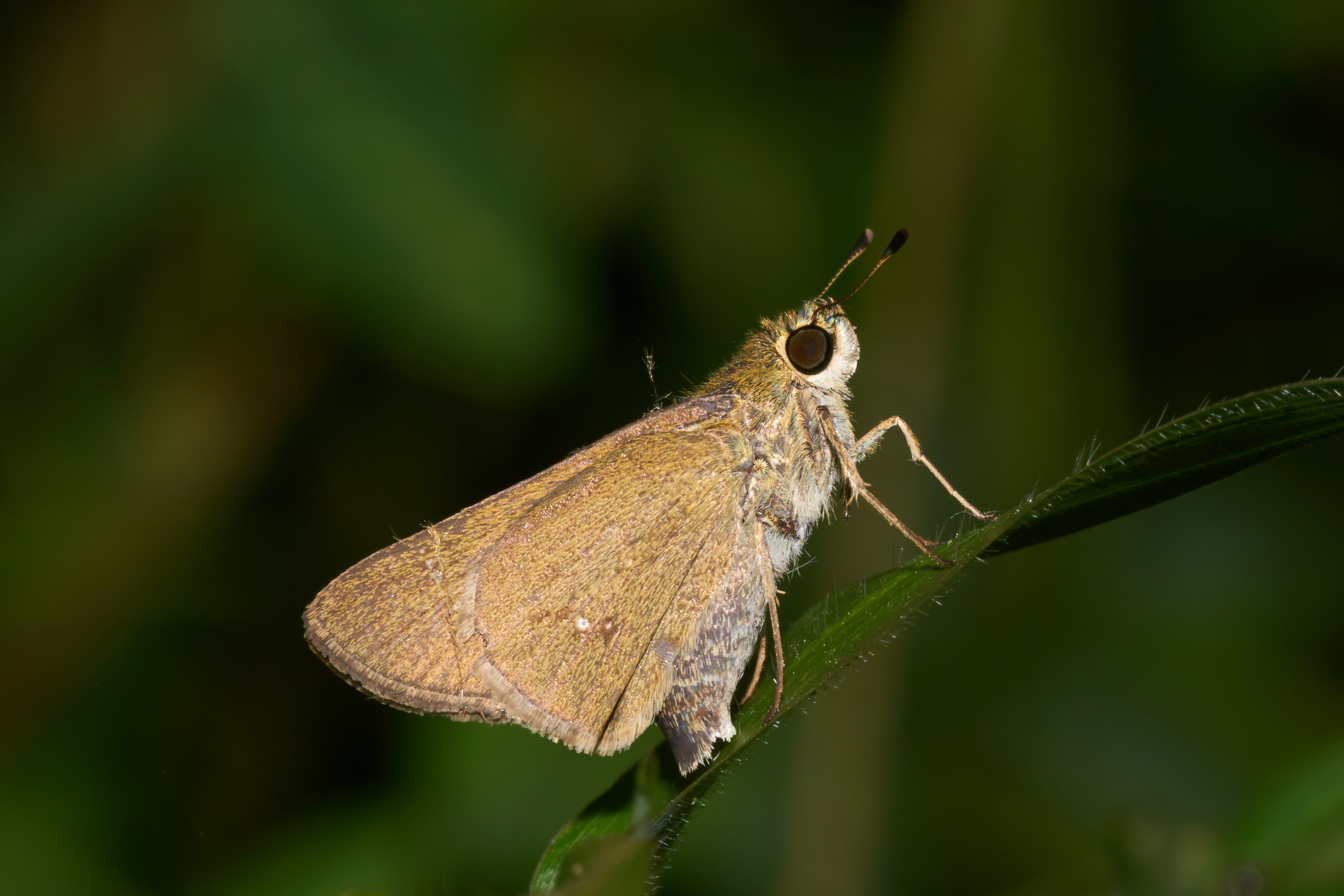

Scientific classification
- Kingdom: Animalia
- Phylum: Arthropoda
- Class: Insecta
- Order: Lepidoptera
- Family: Hesperiidae
- Genus: Parnara
- Species: P. bada

Binomial name
- Parnara bada (Moore, 1878)

Synonyms
- Hesperia bada Moore, 1878; Baoris sida Waterhouse, 1934

= Parnara bada =

Species of butterfly

Parnara bada, the African straight swift, grey swift or Ceylon swift, is a butterfly of the family Hesperiidae. It is found in south-east Asia, from India through China to Indonesia, as well as the north-east coast of Australia.

== Description ==
Male. A smaller insect than Parnara guttata. Upperside dark brown, without the ochreous tint, the hair-like setae on the forewing and the hairs covering the hindwing as in guttata, but grey in colour, not dull ochreous as in that species. Upperside with the spots white, not ochreous-white, and all very small. Forewing with the discal spots disposed as in guttata, but in all the examples before us there are only two sub-apical spots, the uppermost one being absent, the two sub-apical quite minute, being mere dots, the other three increasing in size hindwards, all three quite small, and there are no cell spots. Hindwing with three dots in the disc in an outward curve, one in each of interspaces 2, 3 and 4. Cilia cinereous, with a brownish base, becoming whitish hindwards. Underside paler and duller in colour, much as in guttata, but the colour is somewhat more ochreous, the spots as on the upperside. Antennae, palpi, head and body similar. Female like the male, the spots larger, increasing in size hindwards, only two sub-apical dots, sometimes one and sometimes two cell dots, the usual spot against the sub-median vein in continuation of the discal series, so prominent in guttata, altogether absent, or only very slightly indicated; in the hindwing the three or four discal spots are minute.

— Charles Swinhoe, Lepidoptera Indica. Vol. X

The wingspan is about 30 mm.

The larvae feed on Leersia hexandra, Oryza sativa, Saccharum officinarum and Bambusa.

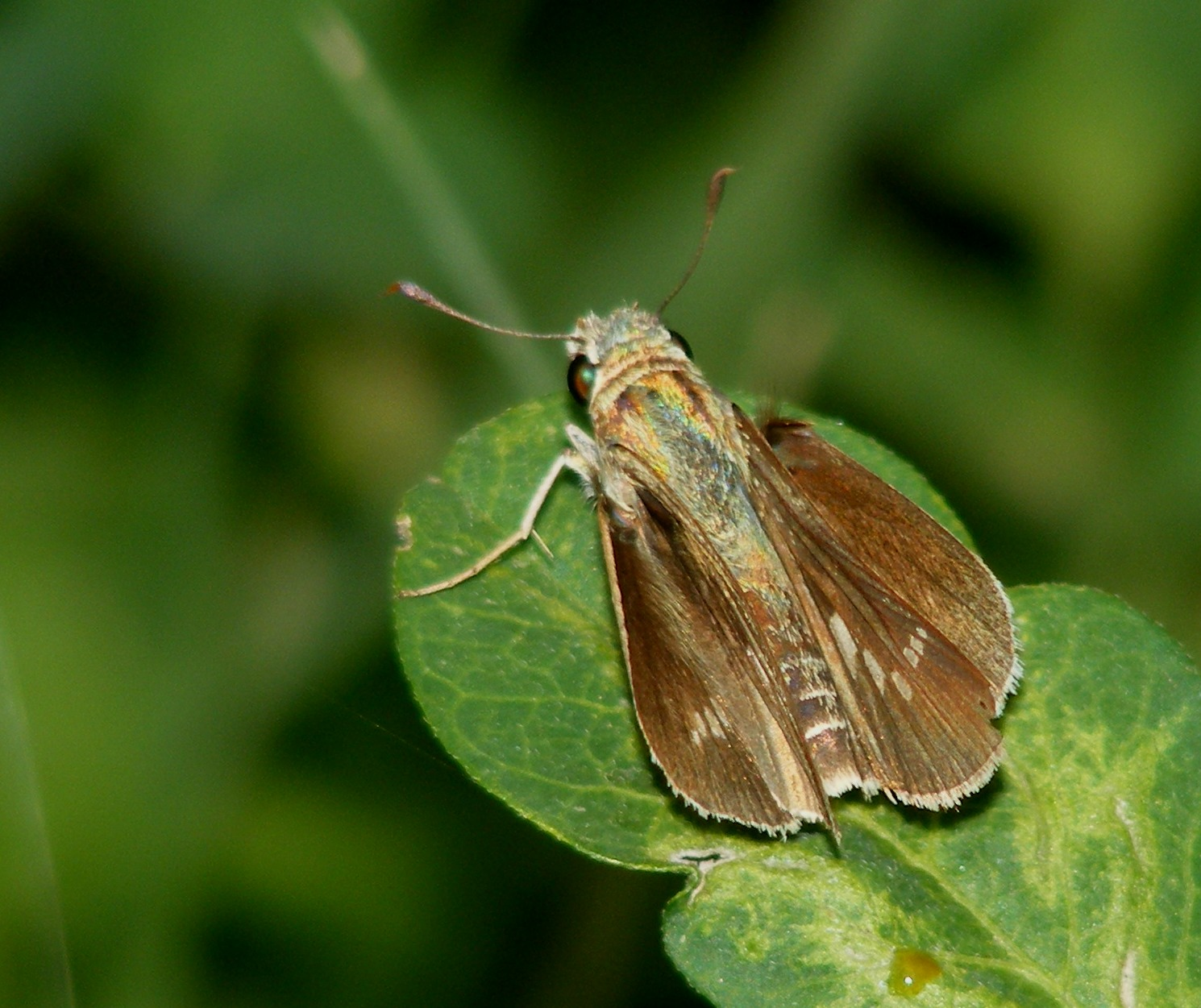
Upper side

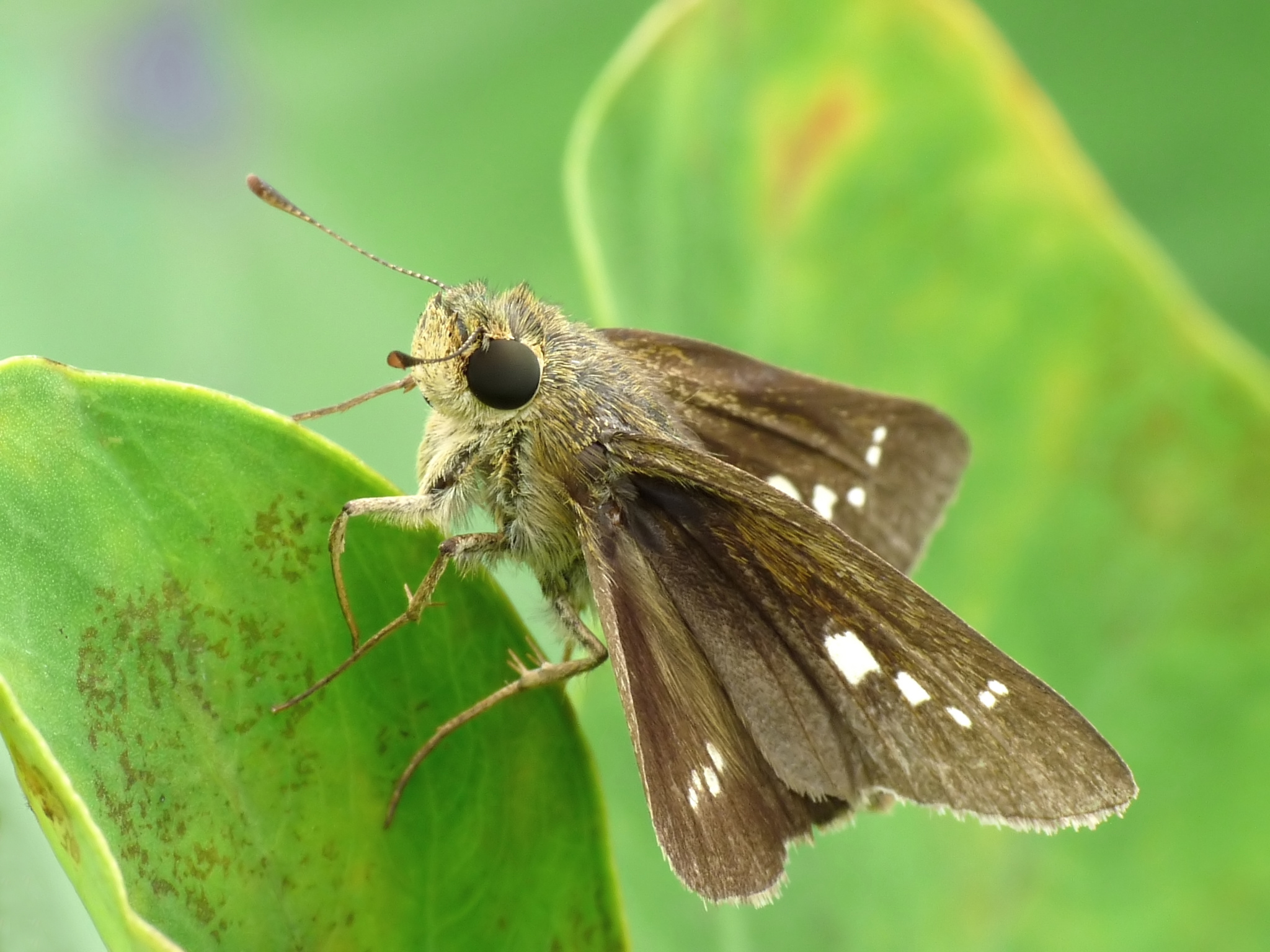
Upper side

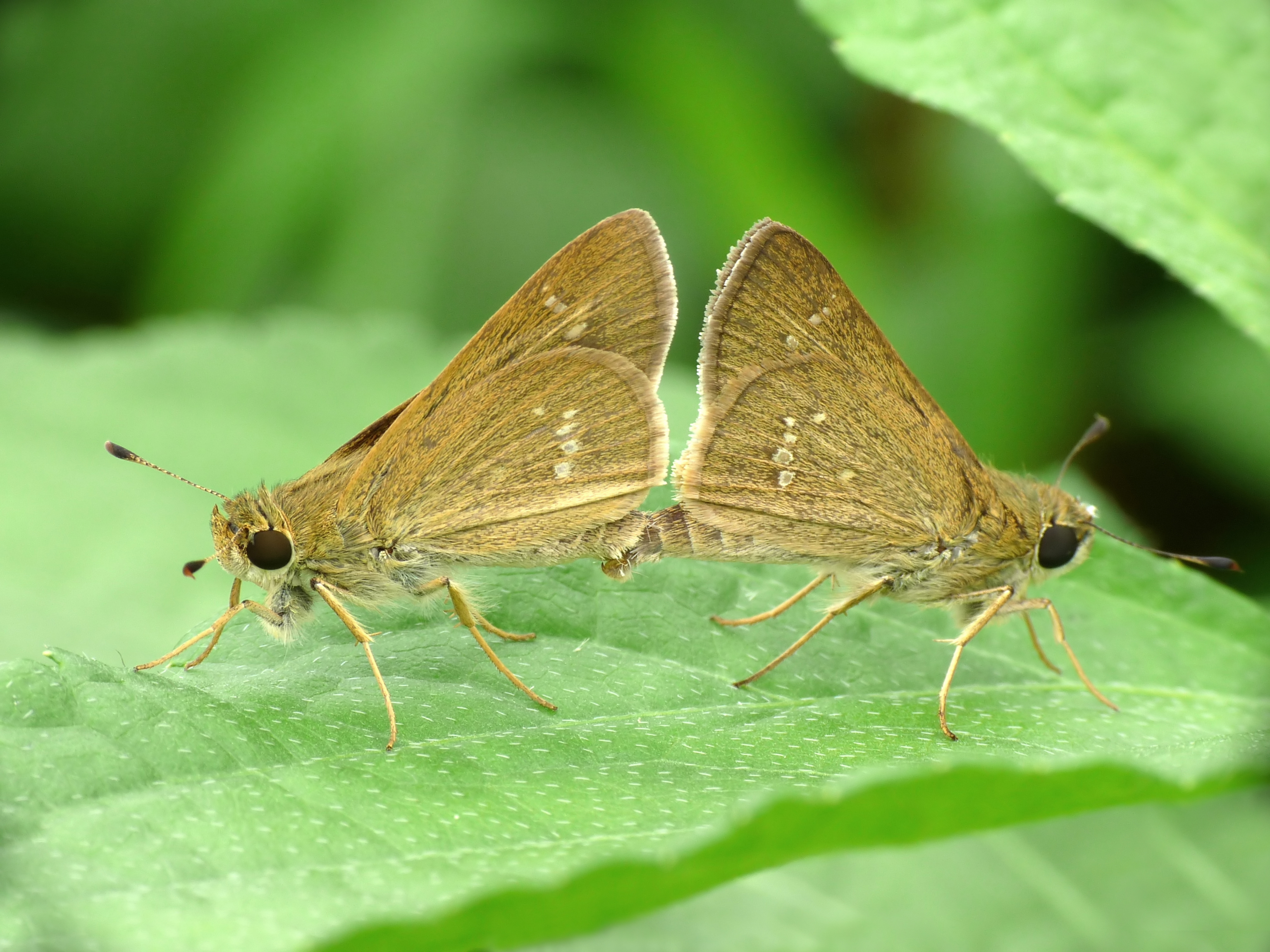
Mating pair

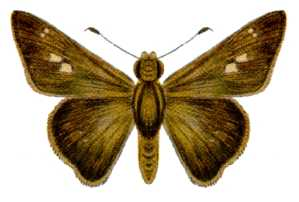
Illustration
