= Iton (disambiguation) =

Iton is a river in Normandy, France.

Iton may also refer to:

- Iton (skipper), genus of grass skipper butterflies
- Iton 77 Israeli monthly literature and culture magazine
- Richard Iton, American professor of African American studies
- Iton (Thessaly), town of ancient Thessaly, Greece
- Iton (Eton) a clan of Beti-Pahuin peoples
