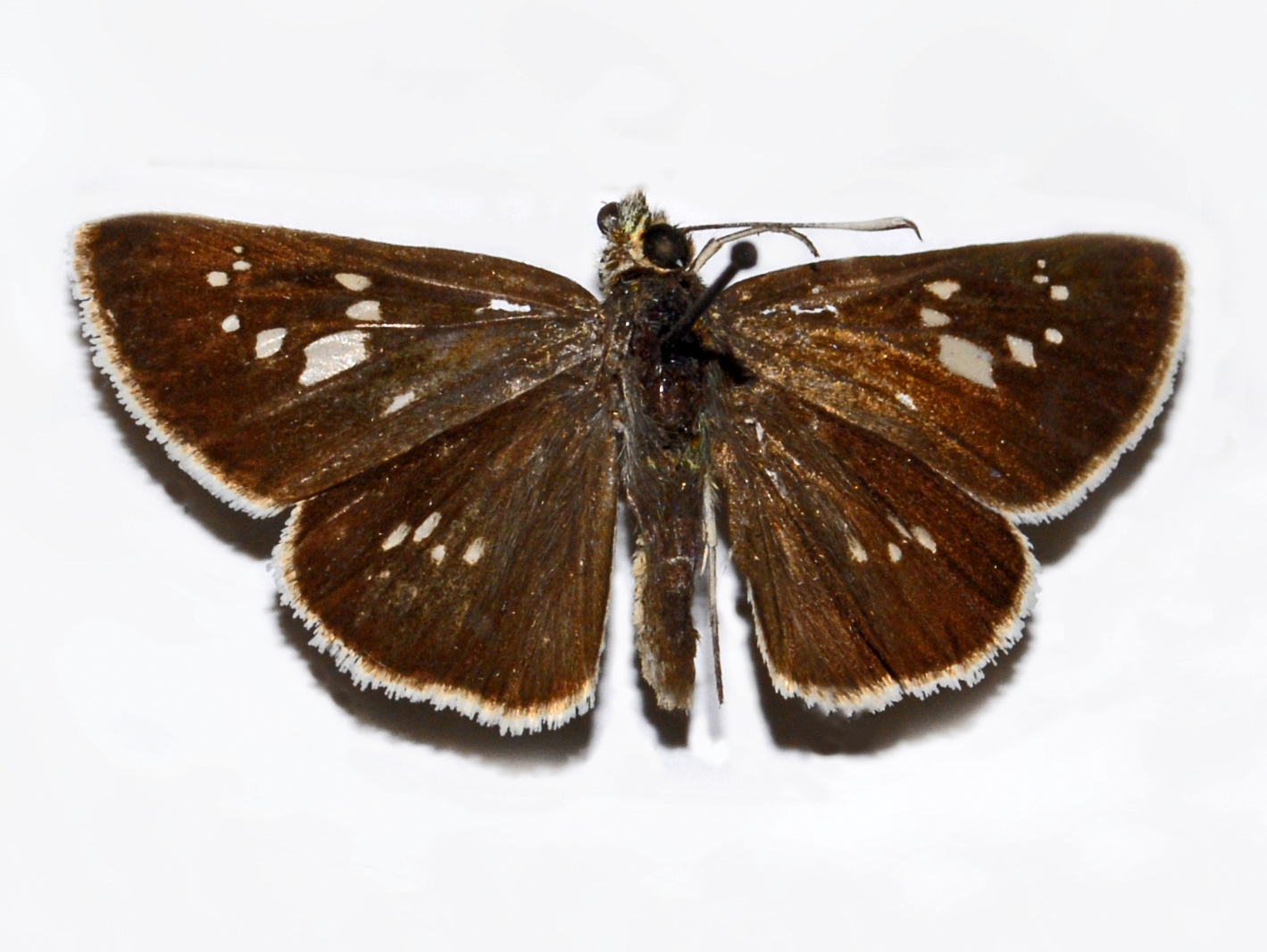
- Polytremis pellucida from Japan – mounted specimen

Scientific classification
- Kingdom: Animalia
- Phylum: Arthropoda
- Class: Insecta
- Order: Lepidoptera
- Family: Hesperiidae
- Tribe: Baorini
- Genus: Polytremis; Mabille, 1904

= Polytremis =

Genus of butterflies

Polytremis is a mainly Chinese genus of grass skipper in the family Hesperiidae.

== Species ==
- Polytremis annama Evans, 1937
- Polytremis caerulescens (Mabille, 1876) China (Tibet)
- Polytremis choui Huang, 1994 China (Fujian)
- Polytremis discreta (Elwes & Edwards, 1897)
- Polytremis eltola (Hewitson, 1869)
- Polytremis flavinerva Chou & Zhou, 1994 China (Guangxi)
- Polytremis gigantea Tsukiyama, Chiba & Fujioka, 1997 China (Sichuan)
- Polytremis gotama Sugiyama, 1999 China (northwest Yunnan)
- Polytremis kiraizana (Sonan, 1938)
- Polytremis lubricans (Herrich-Schäffer, 1869) Indomalayan realm
- Polytremis matsuii Sugiyama, 1999 China (Dujiangyan)
- Polytremis mencia (Moore, 1877) China (Shanghai)
- Polytremis micropunctata Huang, 2003 China (northwest Yunnan)
- Polytremis minuta (Evans, 1926)
- Polytremis nascens (Leech, 1893) China (Chia-kou-ho; Omei-Shan)
- Polytremis pellucida (Murray, 1875)
- Polytremis suprema Sugiyama, 1999
- Polytremis theca (Evans, 1937) China (Sichuan, Shaanxi, Fujian, Anhui, Yunnan)
- Polytremis zina (Evans, 1932) South China, East China, Ussuri

== Host plants ==
Species of the genus Polytremis feed on plants of the family Poaceae. Host plants include the genera Microstegium, Imperata, Miscanthus, Saccharum, Oryza, Phragmites and Sasa.
