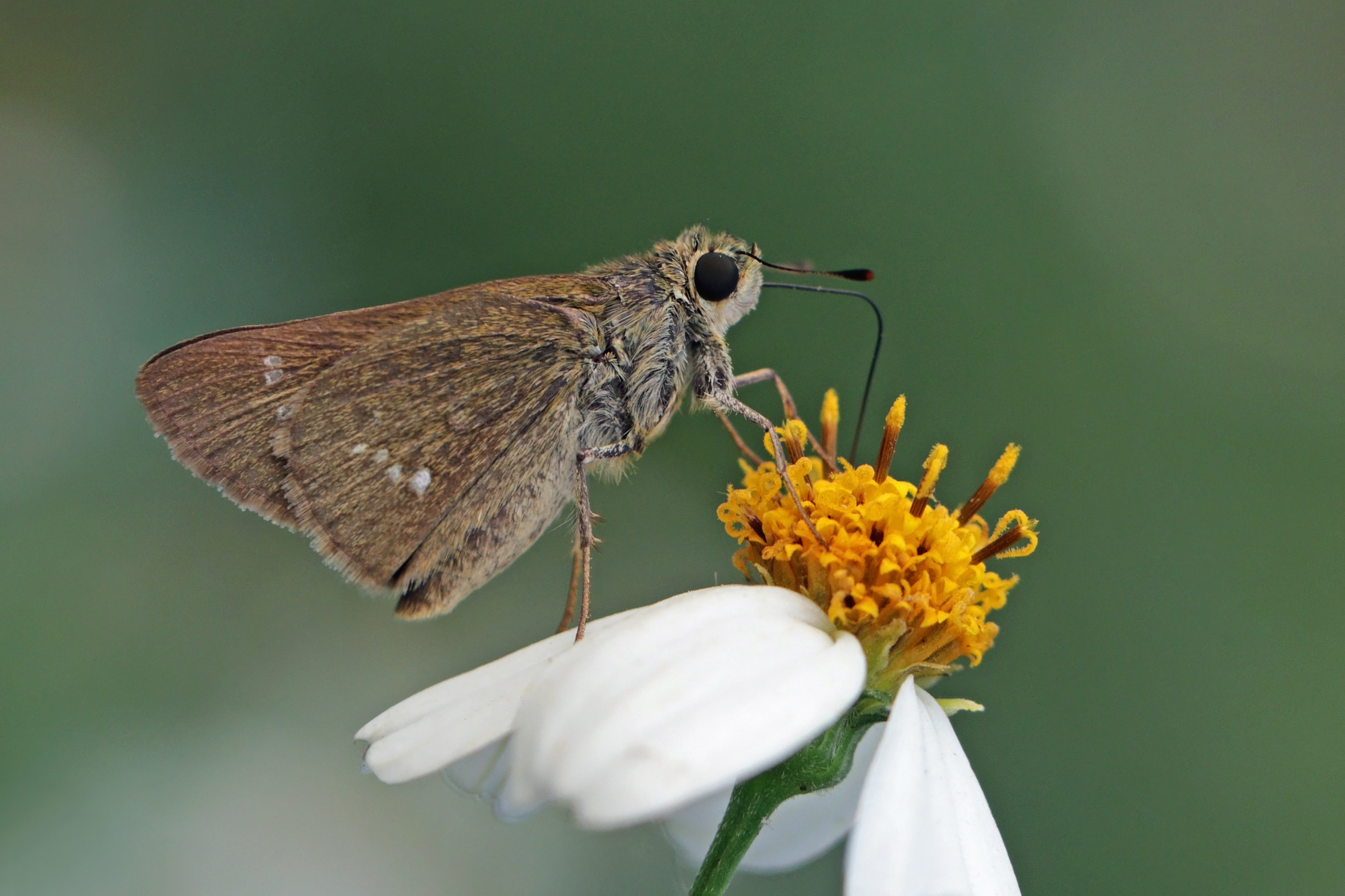
- In Nepal

Scientific classification
- Kingdom: Animalia
- Phylum: Arthropoda
- Class: Insecta
- Order: Lepidoptera
- Family: Hesperiidae
- Tribe: Baorini
- Genus: Parnara; Moore, [1881]

Synonyms
- Baorynnis Waterhouse, 1932

= Parnara =

Genus of butterflies

Parnara is a genus of butterflies in the family Hesperiidae, the skippers. They are native to Asia, Africa and Australia.

These are small, brown skippers that have thin, translucent spots on their wings.

== Species ==
Species include:

- Parnara amalia (Semper, [1879])
- Parnara apostata (Snellen, [1880])
  - P. a. apostata Sumatra, Malay Peninsula, S.Burma, Java, Bali
  - P. a. andra Evans, 1949 Borneo
  - P. a. debdasi Chiba & Eliot, 1991 Nepal
  - P. a. hulsei Devyatkin & Monastyrskii, 1999 South Yunnan
- Parnara bada (Moore, 1878) – Ceylon swift
- Parnara batta Evans, 1949 Southeast China
- Parnara ganga Evans, 1937 – continental swift
- Parnara guttata (Bremer & Grey, [1852]) – straight swift
- Parnara kawazoei Chiba & Eliot, 1991 Philippines, Borneo, Sulawesi
- Parnara monasi (Trimen, 1889) – water watchman
- Parnara naso (Fabricius, 1798)
- Parnara ogasawarensis Matsumura, 1906 Bonin Islands (Japan)

== Biology ==
The larvae feed on Gramineae including Bambusa, Oryza, Apluda, Bothriochloa, Colocasia, Imperata, Microstegium, Zea, Saccharum
