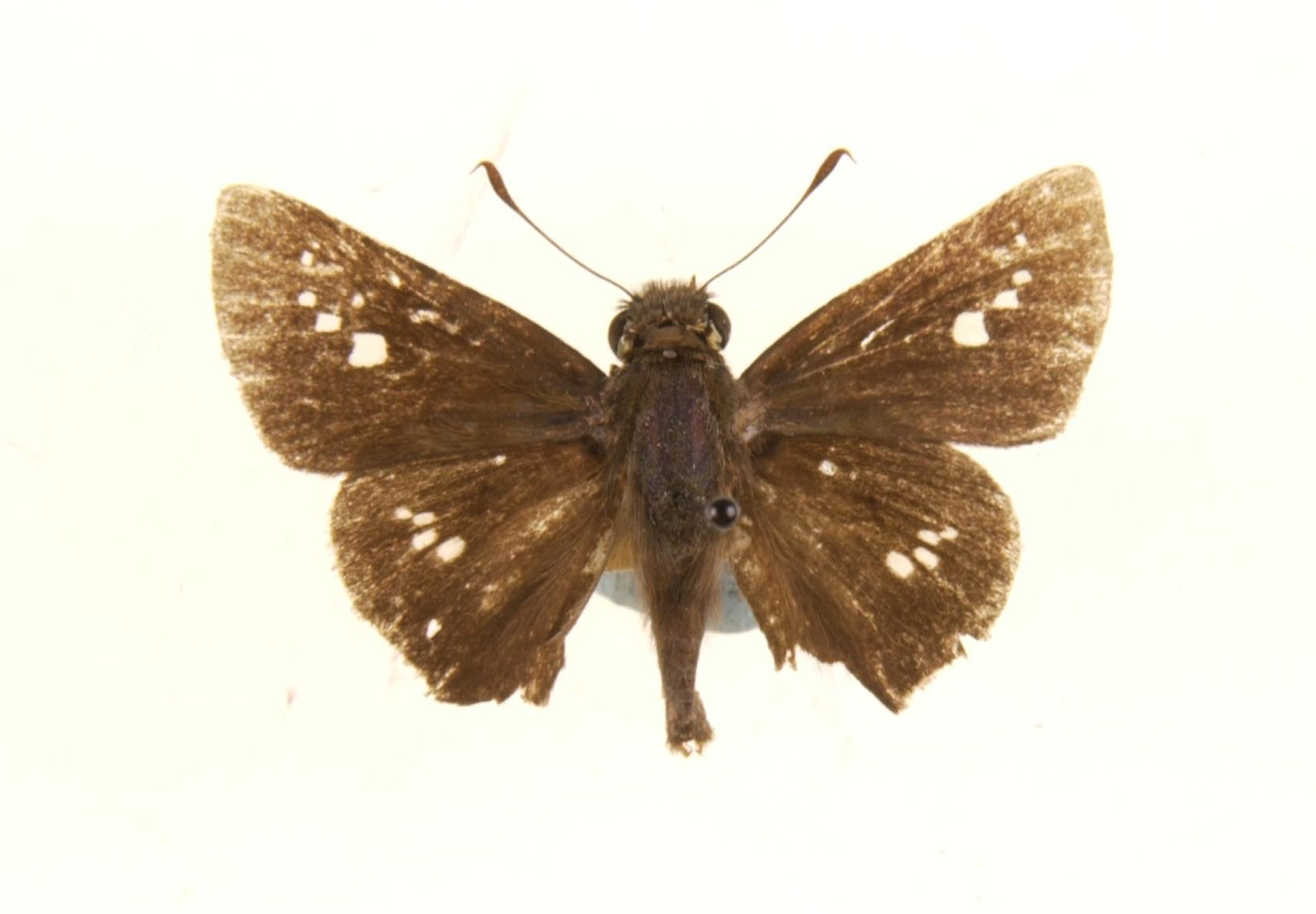
- Museum specimen
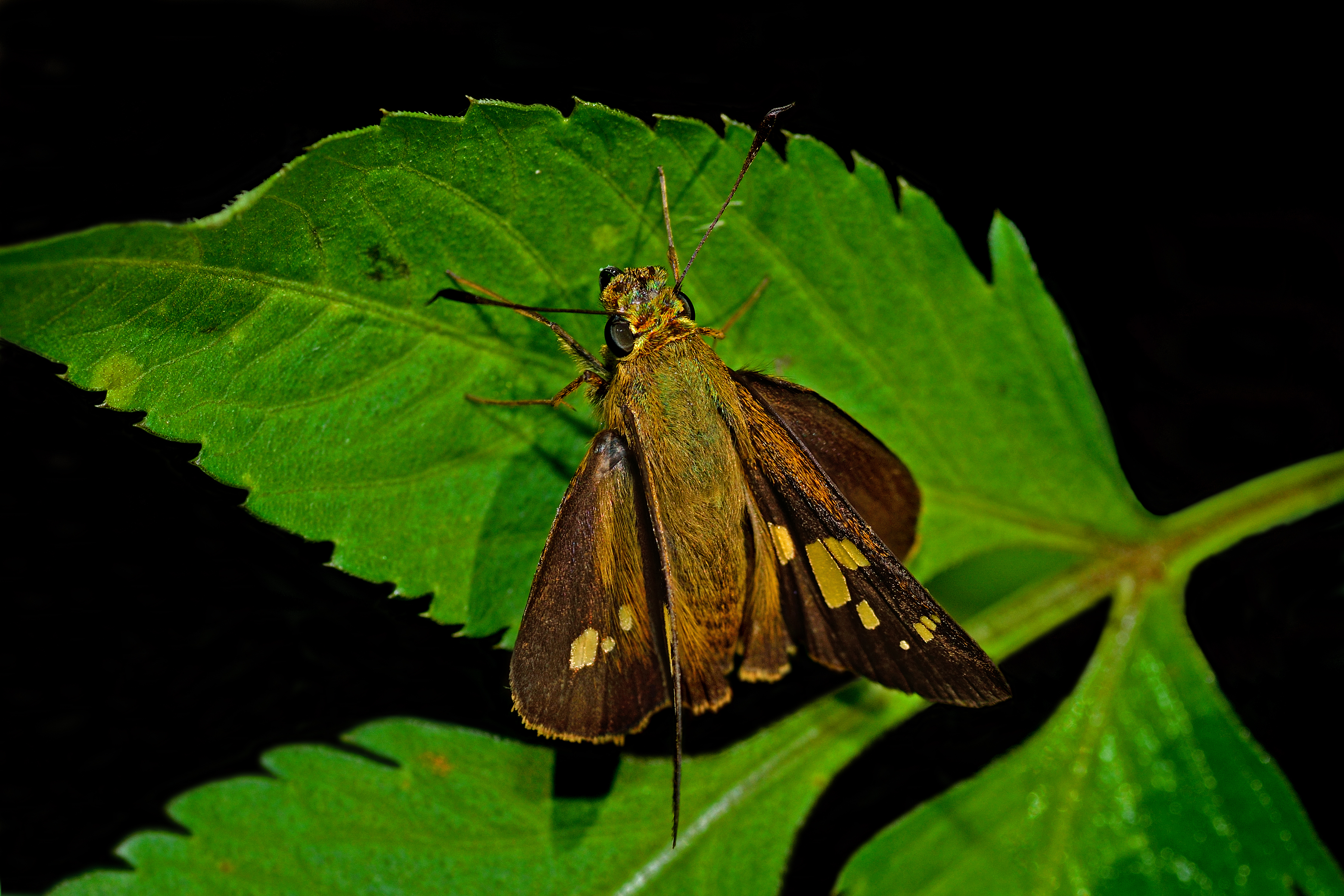

Scientific classification
- Kingdom: Animalia
- Phylum: Arthropoda
- Class: Insecta
- Order: Lepidoptera
- Family: Hesperiidae
- Genus: Polytremis
- Species: P. discreta

Binomial name
- Polytremis discreta (Elwes & Edwards, 1897)

= Polytremis discreta =

Himalayan swift

Species of butterfly

Polytremis discreta, the Himalayan swift, is a butterfly belonging to the family Hesperiidae.A small, brown skipper with distinct white or dirty white spots on its wings. The spot in cell 2 shorter in proportion, its inner and outer edges nearly parallel. The ground-colour of the underside and the fringes, especially those of the hind wing, paler.

== Distribution ==
Murree to Sikkim, Assam, Burma, Malaya, Yunnan
