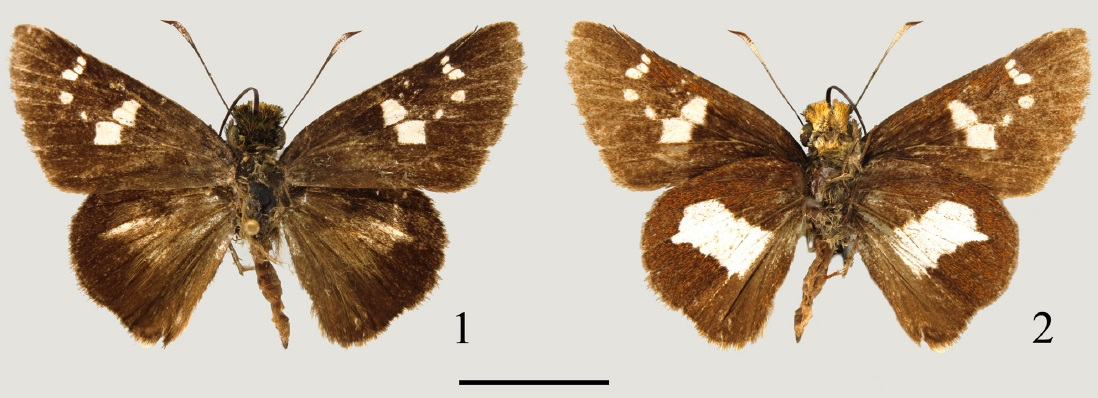
- 1: upperside; 2: underside

Scientific classification
- Kingdom: Animalia
- Phylum: Arthropoda
- Class: Insecta
- Order: Lepidoptera
- Family: Hesperiidae
- Tribe: Baorini
- Genus: Tsukiyamaia; Zhu, Chiba & Wu, 2016
- Species: T. albimacula

Binomial name
- Tsukiyamaia albimacula Zhu, Chiba & Wu, 2016

= Tsukiyamaia =

Genus of butterflies

Tsukiyamaia is a butterfly genus in the family Hesperiidae with only one species, Tsukiyamaia albimacula. It is found in China (Yunnan), Myanmar (Kachin) and Vietnam (Mt. Fan Shi Pang). The species prefers open habitats, such as open field on the hillside, farmland and heavily disturbed shrub land. It is active near the ground and stream under strong sunlight. The female frequents flowers and the male performs padding behavior.

The length of the forewings is 19−20 mm. The ground color of both wings is black brown, with white spots and markings. The costal area of the forewings and entire hindwing are covered with brown scales. The hindwings have a cigar-shaped spot in space M1.

== Etymology ==
The species is named for its large white marking on underside of the hindwing.
