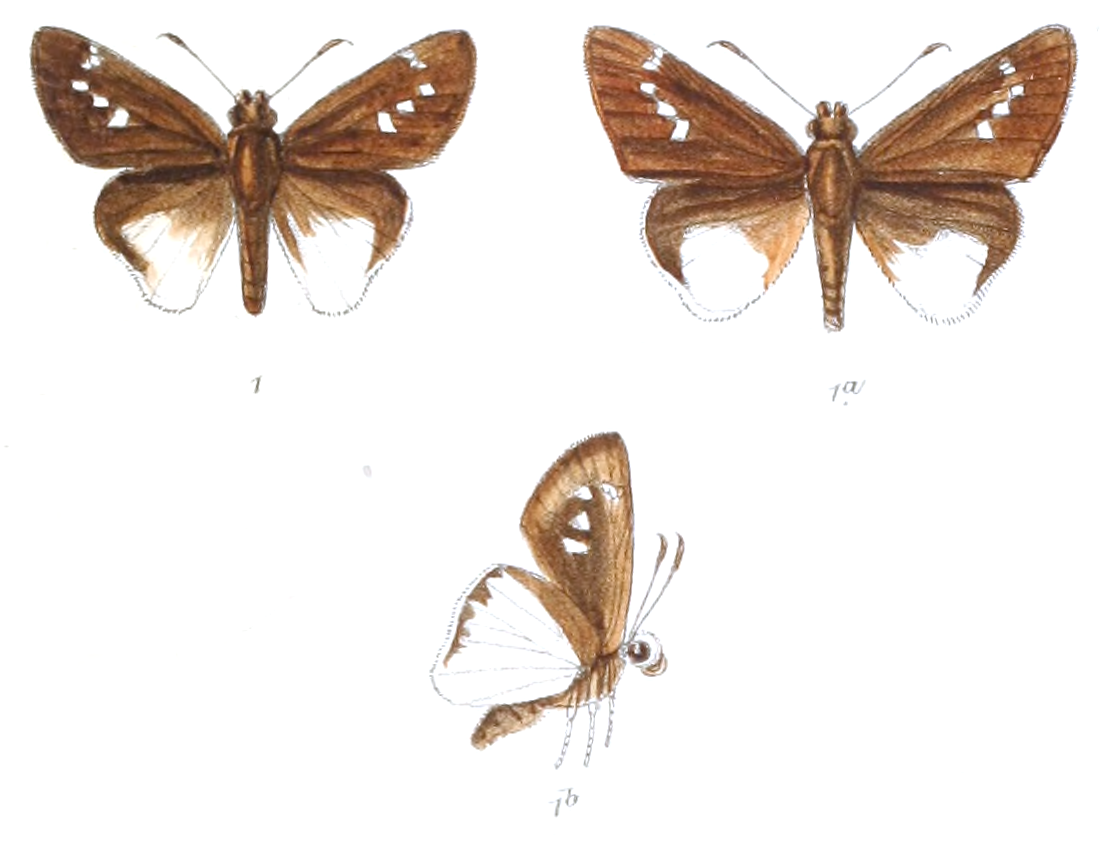

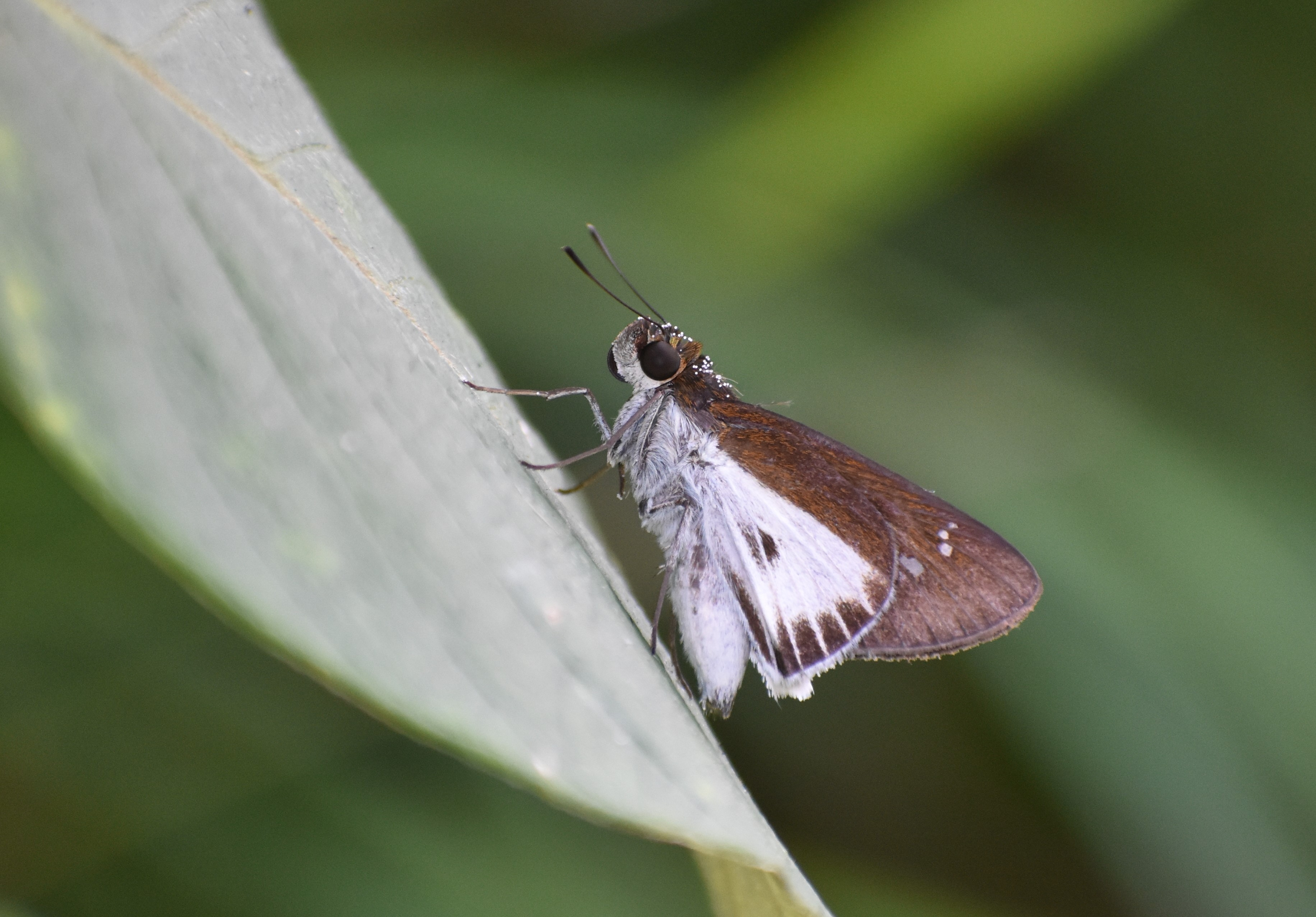

Scientific classification
- Kingdom: Animalia
- Phylum: Arthropoda
- Class: Insecta
- Order: Lepidoptera
- Family: Hesperiidae
- Genus: Iton
- Species: I. semamora

Binomial name
- Iton semamora (Moore, 1866)

= Iton semamora =

Species of butterfly

Iton semamora, the common wight, is a skipper butterfly which is found in South and Southeast Asia, specifically, Sikkim, Myanmar and peninsular Malaysia. There is large upright hair-tuft on the forewing beneath at the hind-margin . On the hindwing beneath the whole cell is white, and also the adjoining three cells are white excepting the apex.
