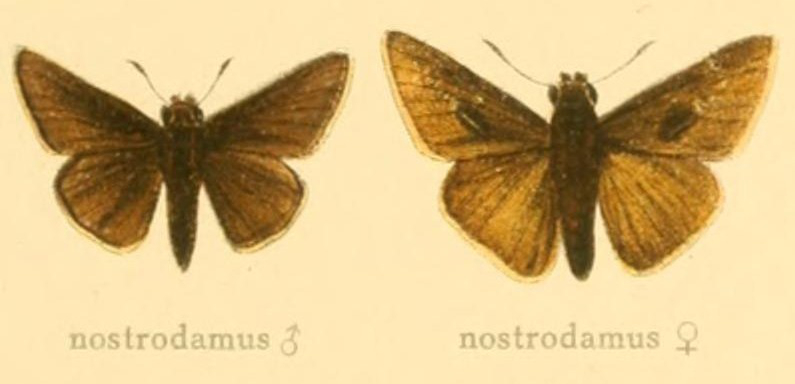
- Gegenes nostrodamus figure in Seitz, male left, female right

Scientific classification
- Kingdom: Animalia
- Phylum: Arthropoda
- Clade: Pancrustacea
- Class: Insecta
- Order: Lepidoptera
- Family: Hesperiidae
- Genus: Gegenes
- Species: G. nostrodamus

Binomial name
- Gegenes nostrodamus (Fabricius, 1793)

Synonyms
- Hesperia nostrodamus Fabricius, 1793; Philoodus nostrodamus; Pamphila proclea Walker, 1870; Gegenes karsana Moore, 1874

= Gegenes nostrodamus =

Dingy swift

Species of butterfly

Gegenes nostrodamus, commonly known as the dingy swift, light pygmy skipper, Mediterranean skipper or veloz de las rieras, is a butterfly belonging to the family Hesperiidae. It is found from the Mediterranean Sea, through Anatolia to Turkestan and India; and also in some subsaharan countries such as Burkina Faso.

The length of the forewings is 15–16 mm. Adults are on wing from May to October in multiple generations.

The larvae feed on various grasses, including Gramineae, Aeluropus (in the Sinai Desert) and Aerulopus and Panicum species.

== Description ==
Dark brown, base smoky black; inner margin of the hindwing paler than the ground colour, and a few white dots on the forewing in the female. Underside pale brown, with some obscure white spots towards the tip of the forewing, and in the female at the hind-margin of the hindwing also. Expands a little over one inch. It inhabits South Europe, North Africa, and Western Asia in August, and is found in dry places. (Kirby)

— Edward Yerbury Watson

Recorded from Campbellpore, Kala Pani and Hurripur, N.-W. India,(Butler).

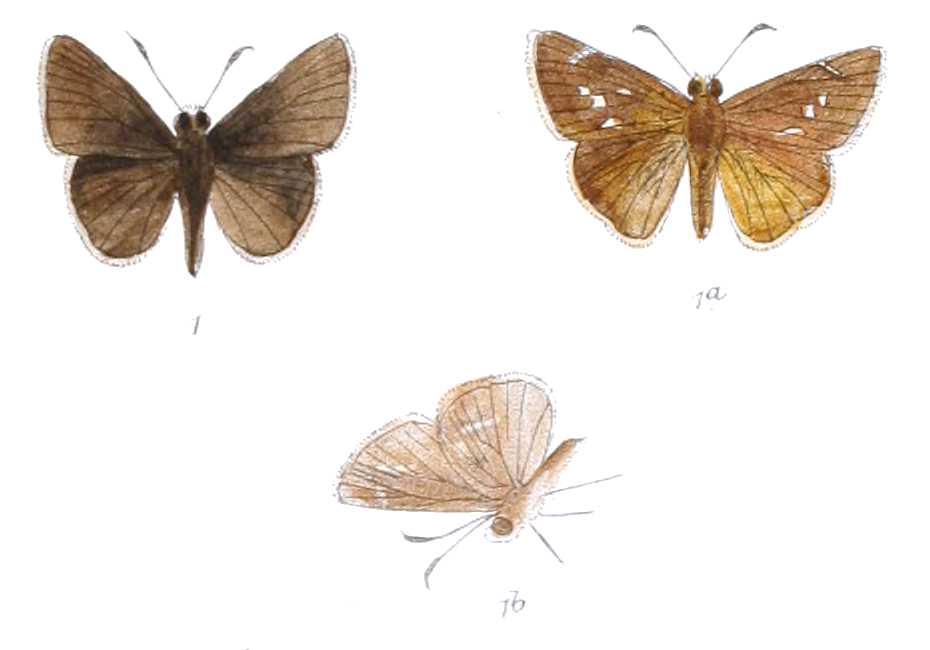

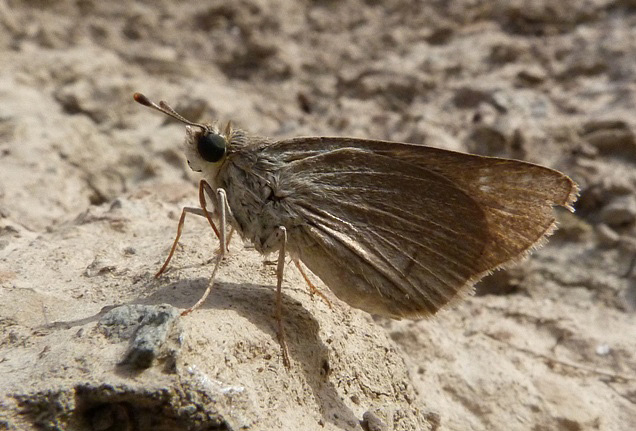

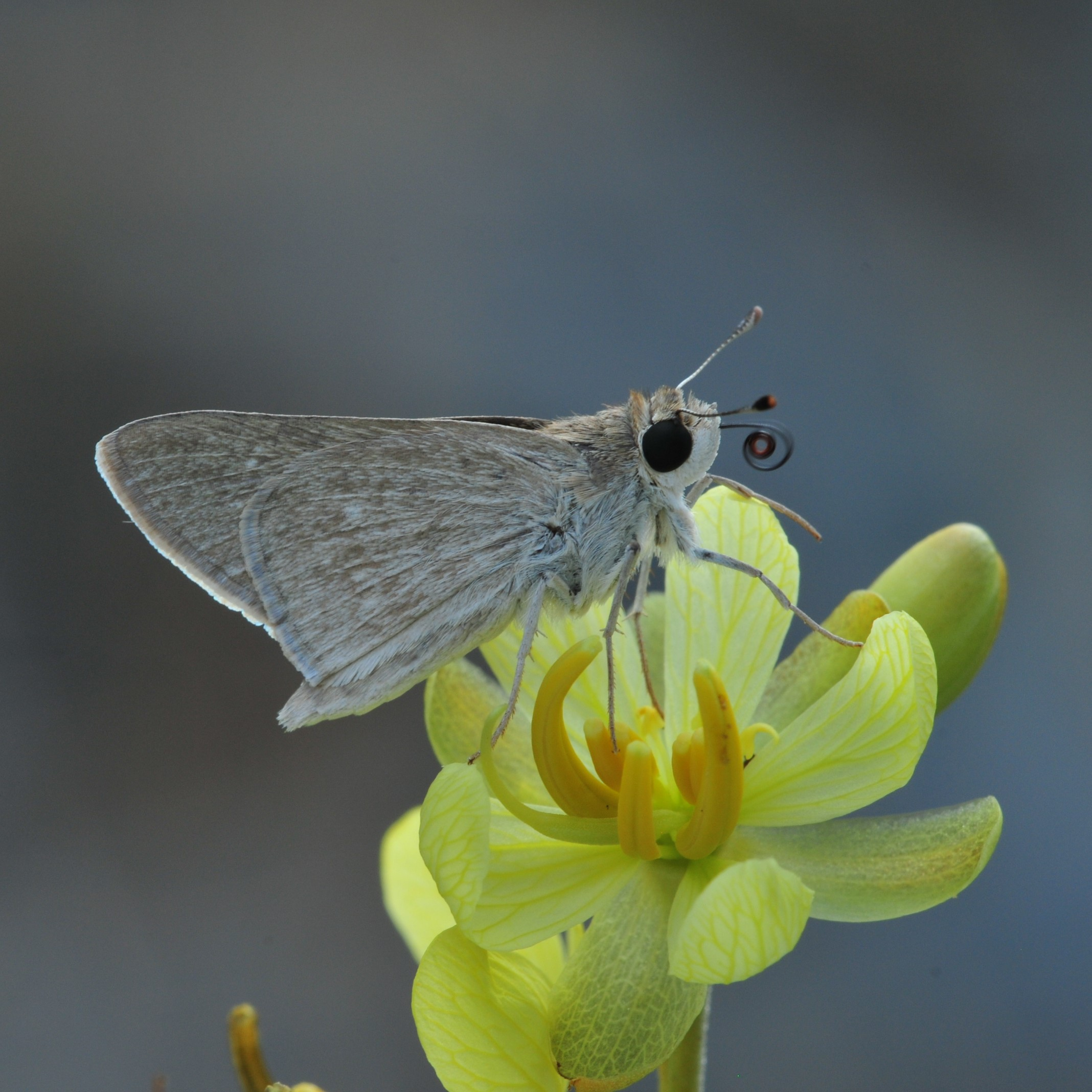
Mediterranean skipper Just finished nectaring from Cassia italica
