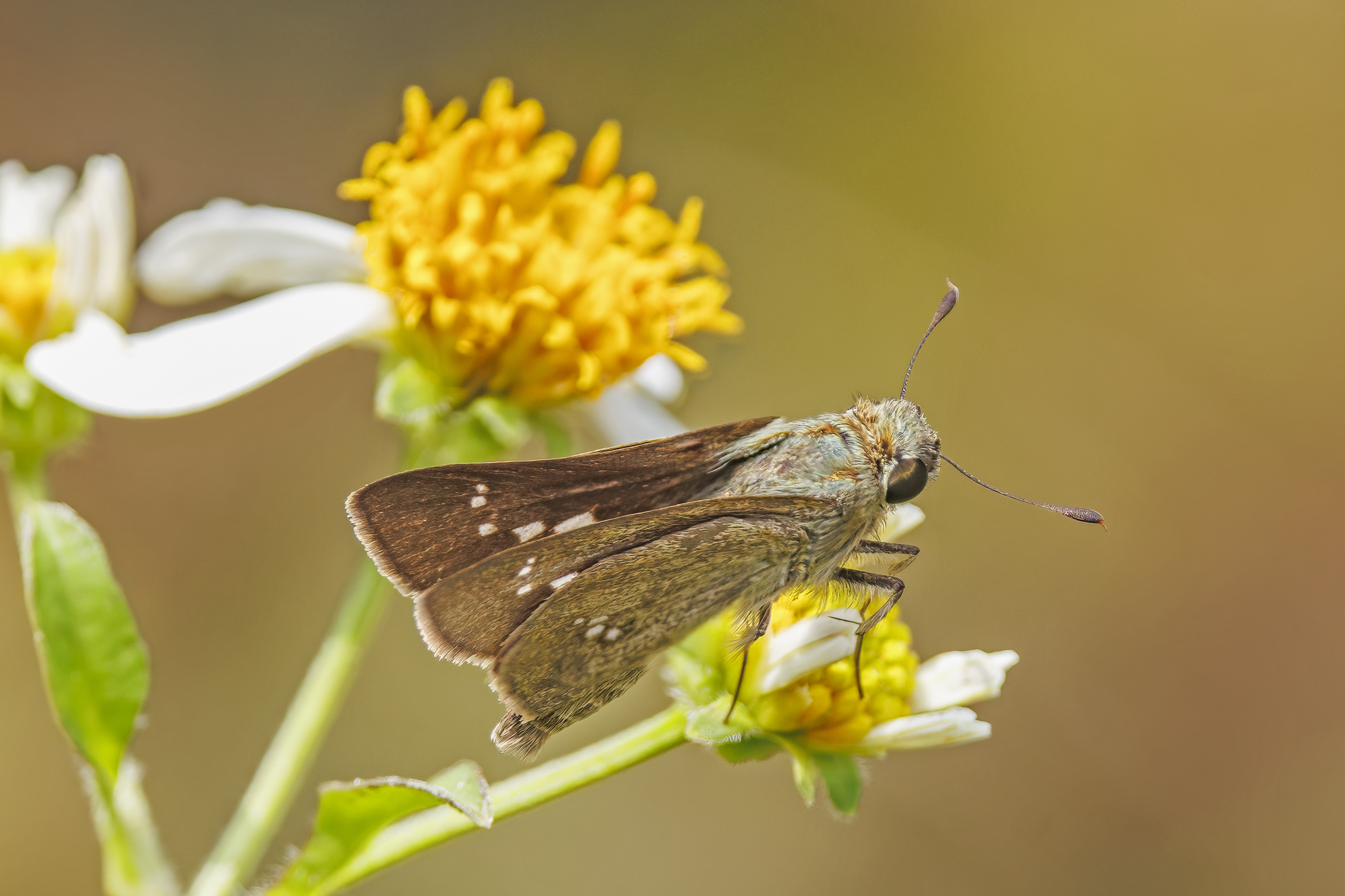

Scientific classification
- Kingdom: Animalia
- Phylum: Arthropoda
- Class: Insecta
- Order: Lepidoptera
- Family: Hesperiidae
- Genus: Parnara
- Species: P. ganga

Binomial name
- Parnara ganga (Evans, 1937)

= Parnara ganga =

Continental swift

Species of butterfly

Parnara ganga, the continental swift, is a butterfly belonging to the family Hesperiidae. It is found in India and south-east Asia, including Vietnam.
