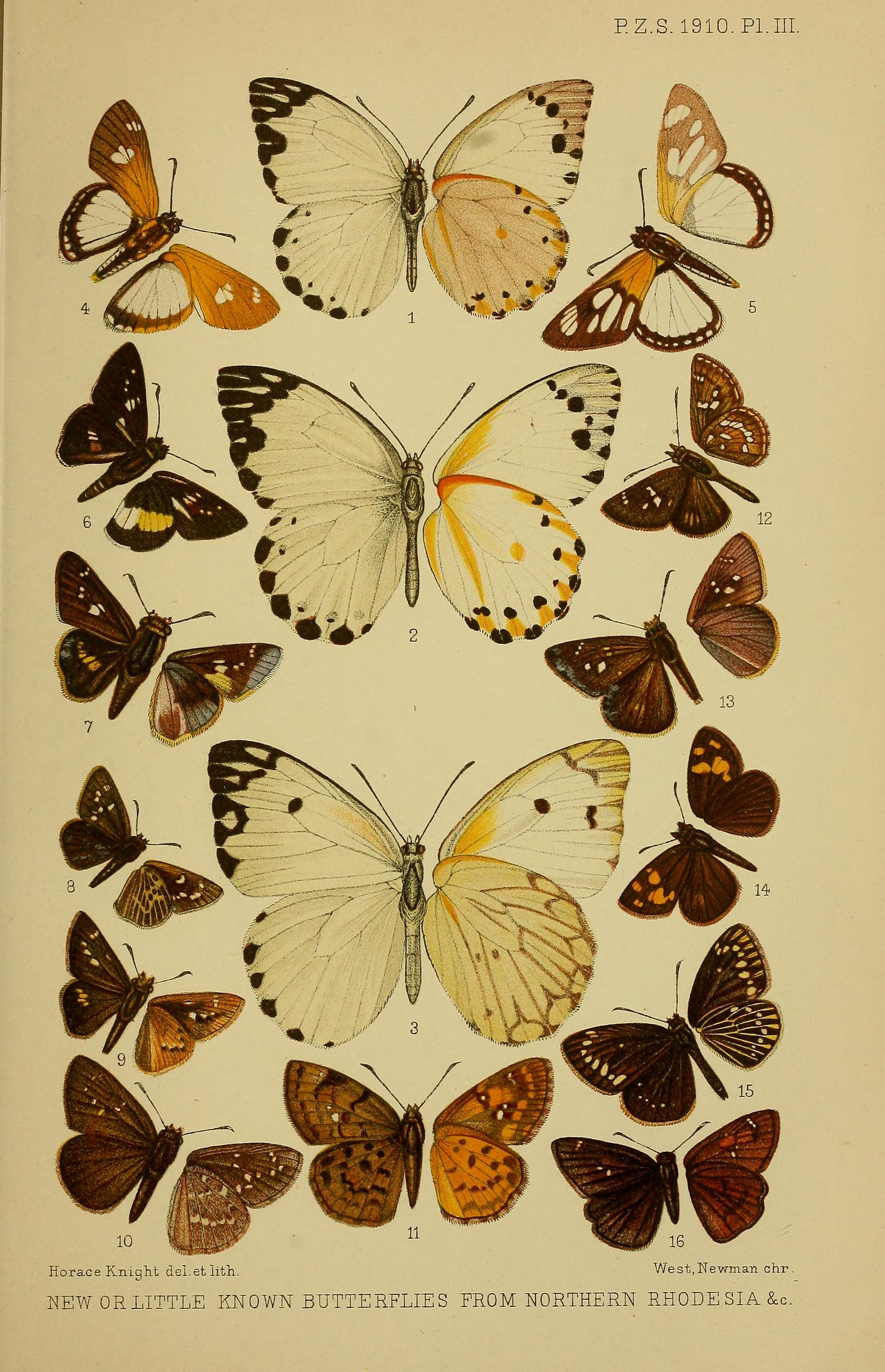
- Parnara monasi figure 9

Scientific classification
- Kingdom: Animalia
- Phylum: Arthropoda
- Clade: Pancrustacea
- Class: Insecta
- Order: Lepidoptera
- Family: Hesperiidae
- Genus: Parnara
- Species: P. monasi

Binomial name
- Parnara monasi (Trimen, 1889)

Synonyms
- Pamphila monasi Trimen, 1889; Parnara anelia Bethune-Baker, 1908; Plastinga podora Plötz, 1884; Pamphila neoba Mabille, 1891; Parnara subochracea Holland, 1896; Parnara chambezi Neave, 1910

= Parnara monasi =

Species of butterfly

Parnara monasi, the water watchman or water skipper, is a butterfly of the family Hesperiidae. It is found in Sub-Saharan Africa, including Senegal, the Gambia, Guinea, Burkina Faso, Sierra Leone, Ivory Coast, Ghana, Nigeria, Cameroon, Gabon, the Democratic Republic of the Congo, Zambia, Mozambique, Zimbabwe, Botswana, South Africa (Limpopo Province, Mpumalanga, KwaZulu-Natal) and Eswatini. The habitat consists of marshes, grassy river-banks and riverine forests in savanna settings.

The wingspan is 30–33 mm for males. Adults are on wing year round but are most common from January to May.

The larvae feed on Saccharum species, Andropogon canaliculatus and Imperata cylindrica.
