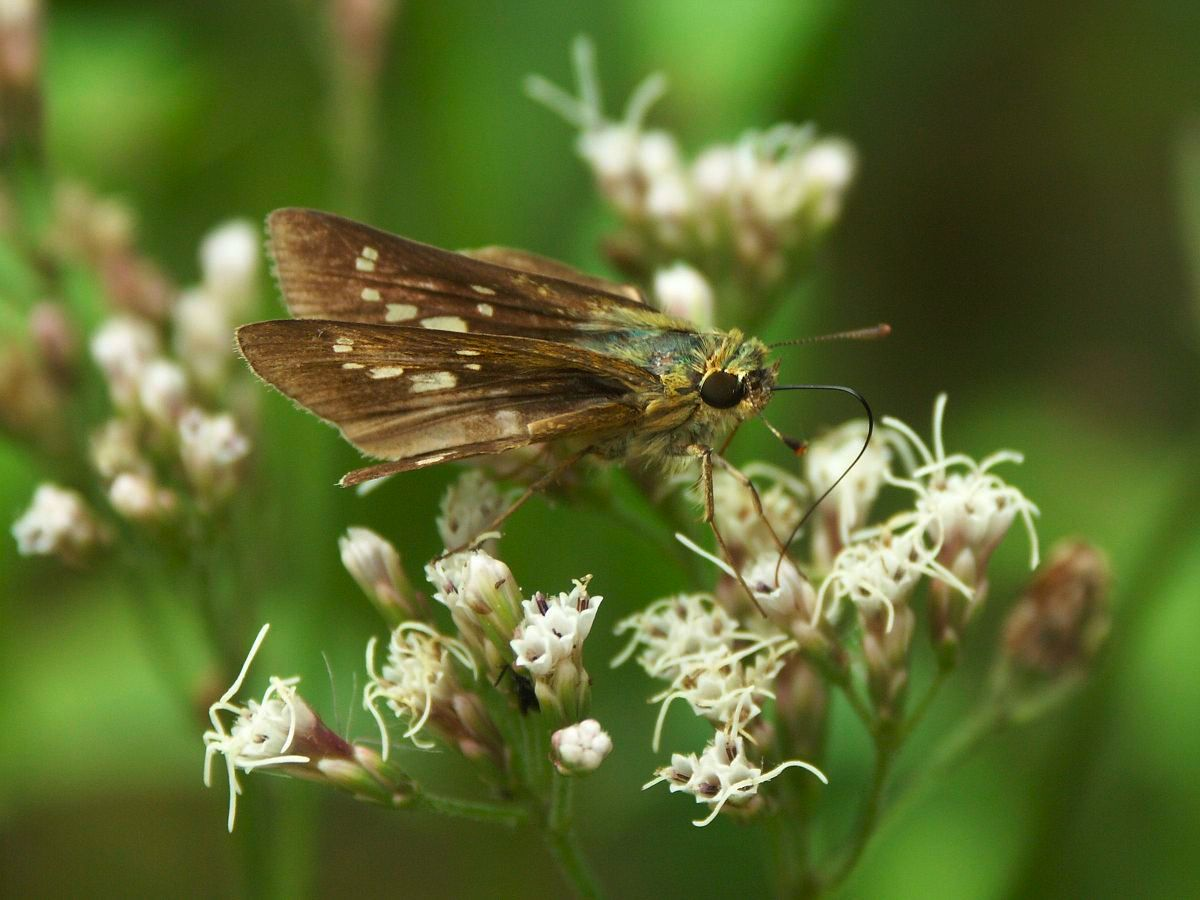
- Polytremis pellucida
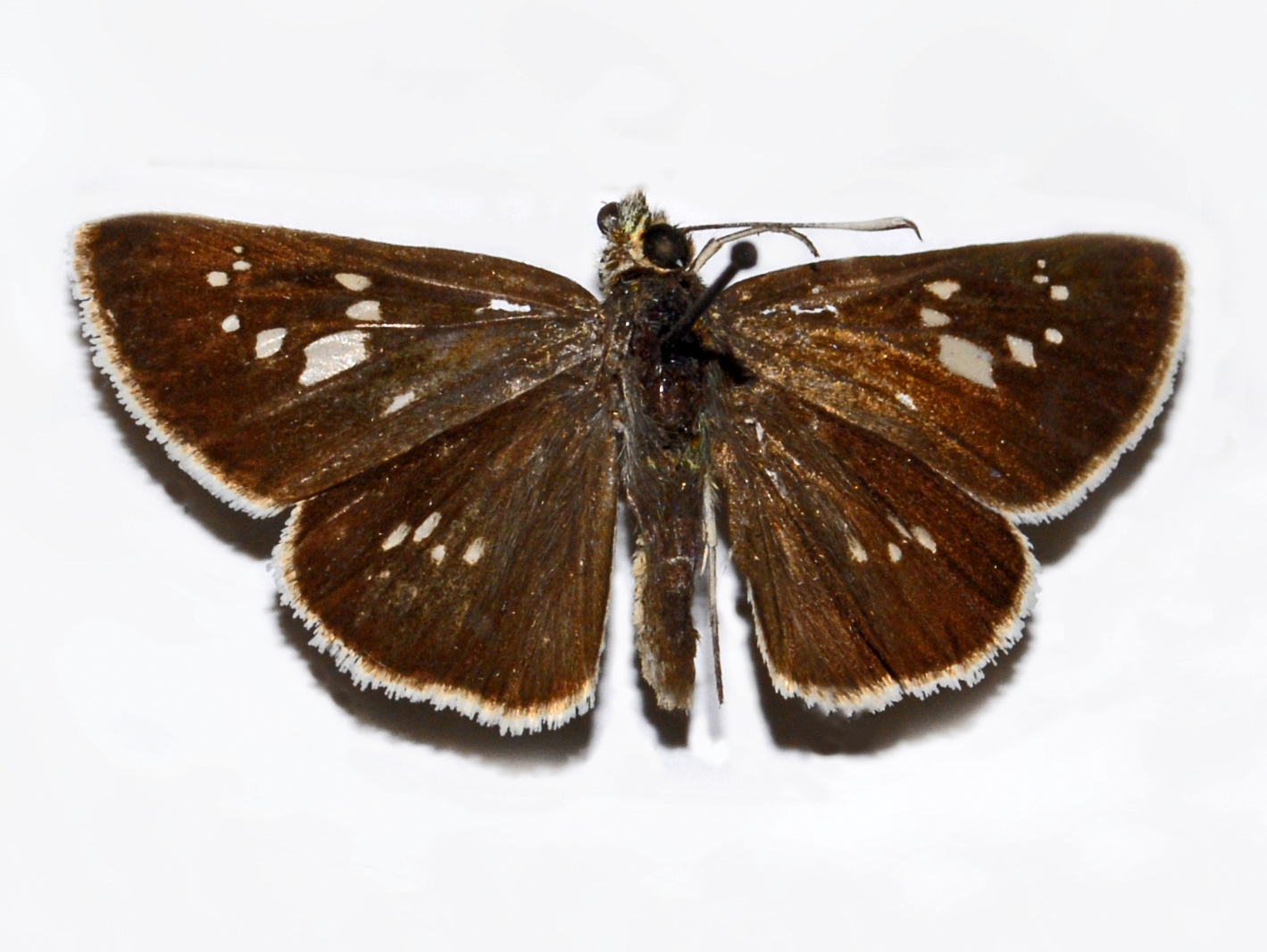
- Polytremis pellucida from Japan, upperside. Mounted specimen

Scientific classification
- Kingdom: Animalia
- Phylum: Arthropoda
- Class: Insecta
- Order: Lepidoptera
- Family: Hesperiidae
- Genus: Polytremis
- Species: P. pellucida

Binomial name
- Polytremis pellucida (R. P. Murray, 1875)

Synonyms
- Pamphila pellucida Murray, 1875; Pamphila quinquepuncta Mabille, 1883; Pamphila sachalinensis Matsumura, 1925

= Polytremis pellucida =

Species of butterfly

Polytremis pellucida is a butterfly belonging to the family Hesperiidae.

== Subspecies ==
- Polytremis pellucida pellucida - Japan, South Sakhalin, Kunashir and Shikotan Islands. The only indication for continental Russia (Fujioka et al., 1997) is based on a specimen from 19th century.
- Polytremis pellucida quanta Evans, 1949 - China: Guniujiang, Anhui
- Polytremis pellucida asahinai Shirozu, 1952 - Taiwan
- Polytremis pellucida inexpecta Tsukiyama, Chiba & Fujioka, 1997 - China: Zhejiang

== Description ==
Polytremis pellucida has a wingspan of about 30 millimetres (1.2 in). Upperside of the forewings is dark brown, with a row of small white spots and markings. Also the hindwings are dark brown and have four elongate to ovoid white spots.

== Host plants ==
Larvae of this species feed on plants of the family Poaceae. Among the host plants are reported Miscanthus sinensis, Oryza sativa and some unidentified species of the genera Phragmites and Sasa.

== Distribution ==
Polytremis pellucida is present in eastern Asia, in the Indomalayan realm and in the Palearctic realm.
