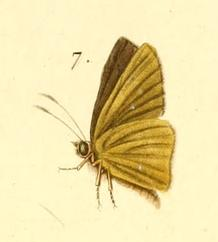

Scientific classification
- Kingdom: Animalia
- Phylum: Arthropoda
- Class: Insecta
- Order: Lepidoptera
- Family: Hesperiidae
- Genus: Parnara
- Species: P. naso

Binomial name
- Parnara naso (Fabricius, 1798)

Synonyms
- Hesperia naso Fabricius, 1798; Hesperia poutieri Boisduval, 1833; Hesperia marchalii Boisduval, 1833; Parnara marchalii bigutta Evans, 1937; Hesperia poutieri Boisduval, 1833; Hesperia ibara Plötz, 1883; Pamphila albigutta Mabille 1887

= Parnara naso =

African straight

Species of butterfly

Parnara naso, the African straight or straight swift, is a skipper butterfly belonging to the family Hesperiidae. It is found on Mauritius, Réunion and Madagascar. The habitat consists of forest margins and anthropogenic environments.

The larvae feed on Oryza sativa and Saccharum officinarum.

== Subspecies ==
- Parnara naso naso (Mauritius)
- Parnara naso bigutta Evans, 1937 (Reunion)
- Parnara naso poutieri (Boisduval, 1833) (Madagascar)
