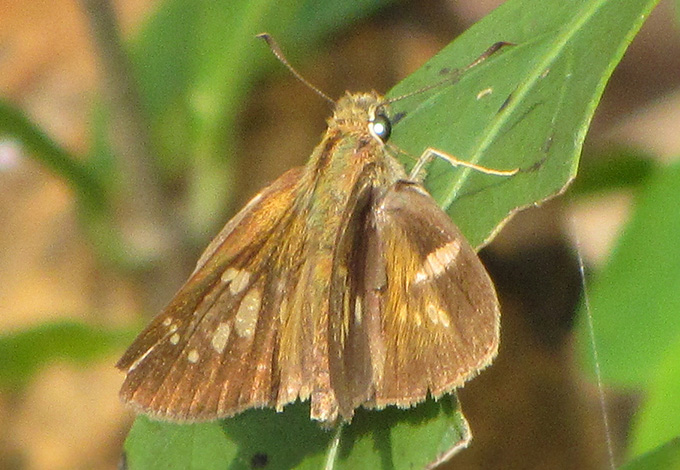

Scientific classification
- Kingdom: Animalia
- Phylum: Arthropoda
- Clade: Pancrustacea
- Class: Insecta
- Order: Lepidoptera
- Family: Hesperiidae
- Genus: Polytremis
- Species: P. lubricans

Binomial name
- Polytremis lubricans (Herrich-Schäffer, 1869)

Synonyms
- Goniloba lubricans Herrich-Schäffer, 1869; Gegenes contigua Mabille, 1877; Hesperia toona Moore, 1878; Parnara toona; Piepers & Snellen, 1910; Polytrema lubricans; Baoris lubricans

= Polytremis lubricans =

Contiguous swift

Species of butterfly

Polytremis lubricans, the contiguous swift, is a butterfly belonging to the family Hesperiidae. It is found in the Indomalayan realm.

== Subspecies ==
- Polytremis lubricans lubricans (Tibet, India, Indo-China, Yunnan, Malay Peninsula, Sumatra, Java, Borneo, Philippines, Sulawesi, Sangihe, Banggai, Sula)
- Polytremis lubricans taiwana Matsumura, 1919 (Taiwan, Anhui, Yunnan)

== Description ==
Frederic Moore (1878) gives a detailed description for Hesperia toona:

Male. Differs in the fore wings being slightly more elongate, the hind wing more convex exteriorly, and the anal angle less lobed; markings above similar, those on the fore wing narrower, the spot between the. median branches elongated and extending to their basal angle; those on the hind wing very small, the outer spot crossed by a vein. Underside brownish-ochreous; base of fore wing slightly dusky-ochreous; markings as above.

— Frederic Moore

== Biology ==
The larva on feeds on Imperata, Microstegium, Miscanthus
