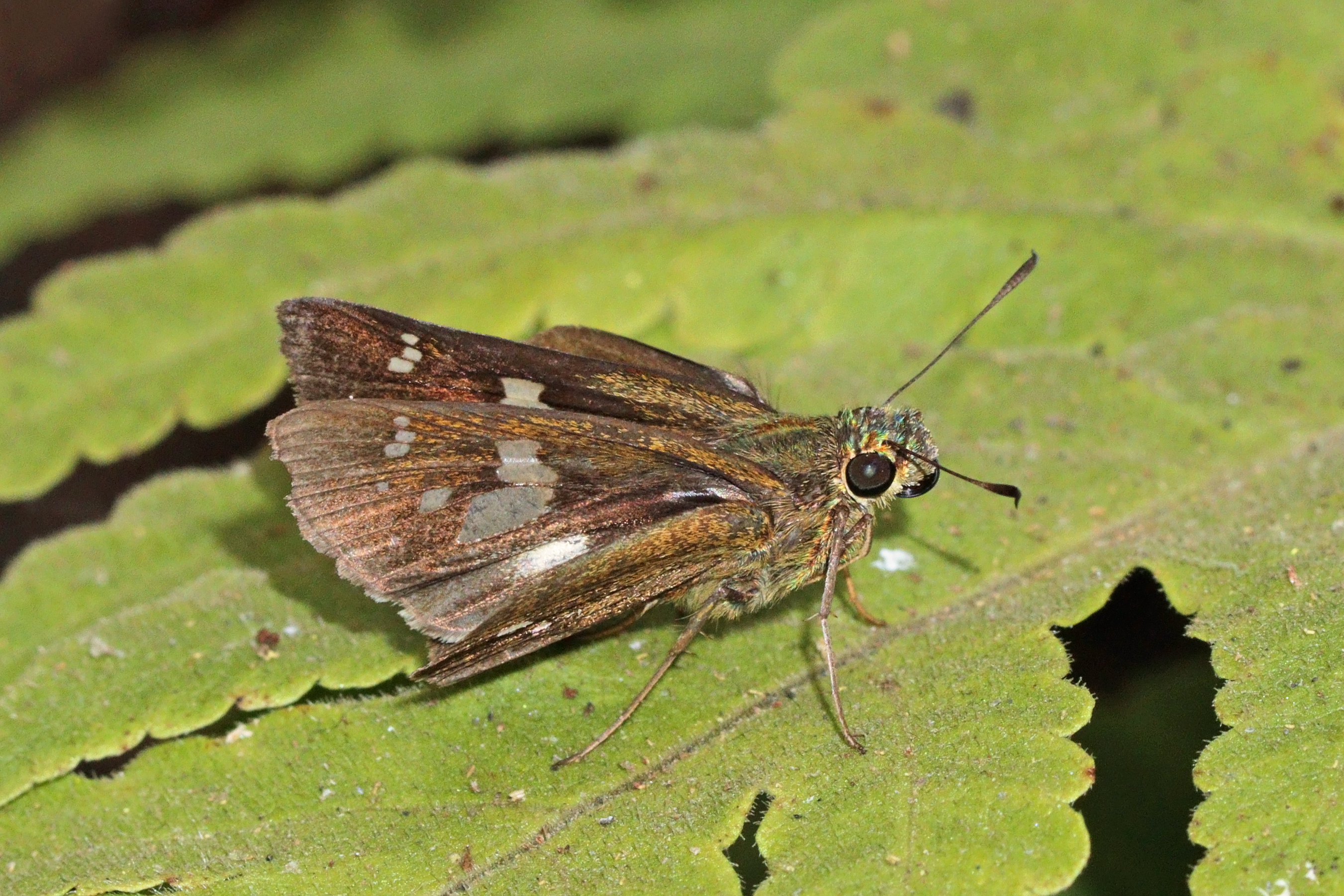
- In Nepal

Scientific classification
- Kingdom: Animalia
- Phylum: Arthropoda
- Class: Insecta
- Order: Lepidoptera
- Family: Hesperiidae
- Genus: Polytremis
- Species: P. eltola

Binomial name
- Polytremis eltola (Hewitson, 1869)

Synonyms
- Parnara eltola

= Polytremis eltola =

Species of butterfly

Polytremis eltola, the yellow spot swift, is a species of skipper butterfly found in the Indomalayan realm.

== Description ==
Upperside dark brown. Anterior wing with eight transparent white spots, and a spot of yellow near the inner margin: the three largest spots across the middle, two outside of these, and three near the apex. Posterior wing with three transparent spots. Underside as above, except that it is rufous-brown.

— Edward Yerbury Watson

Found in Darjeeling, Kumaon (Doherty); Cachar (Wood-Mason and de Niceville); Kangra, N.-W. Himalayas (Moore) Sikkim (de Niceville; Elwes) and (P. e. corbeti Evans, 1937) the Malay Peninsula.
