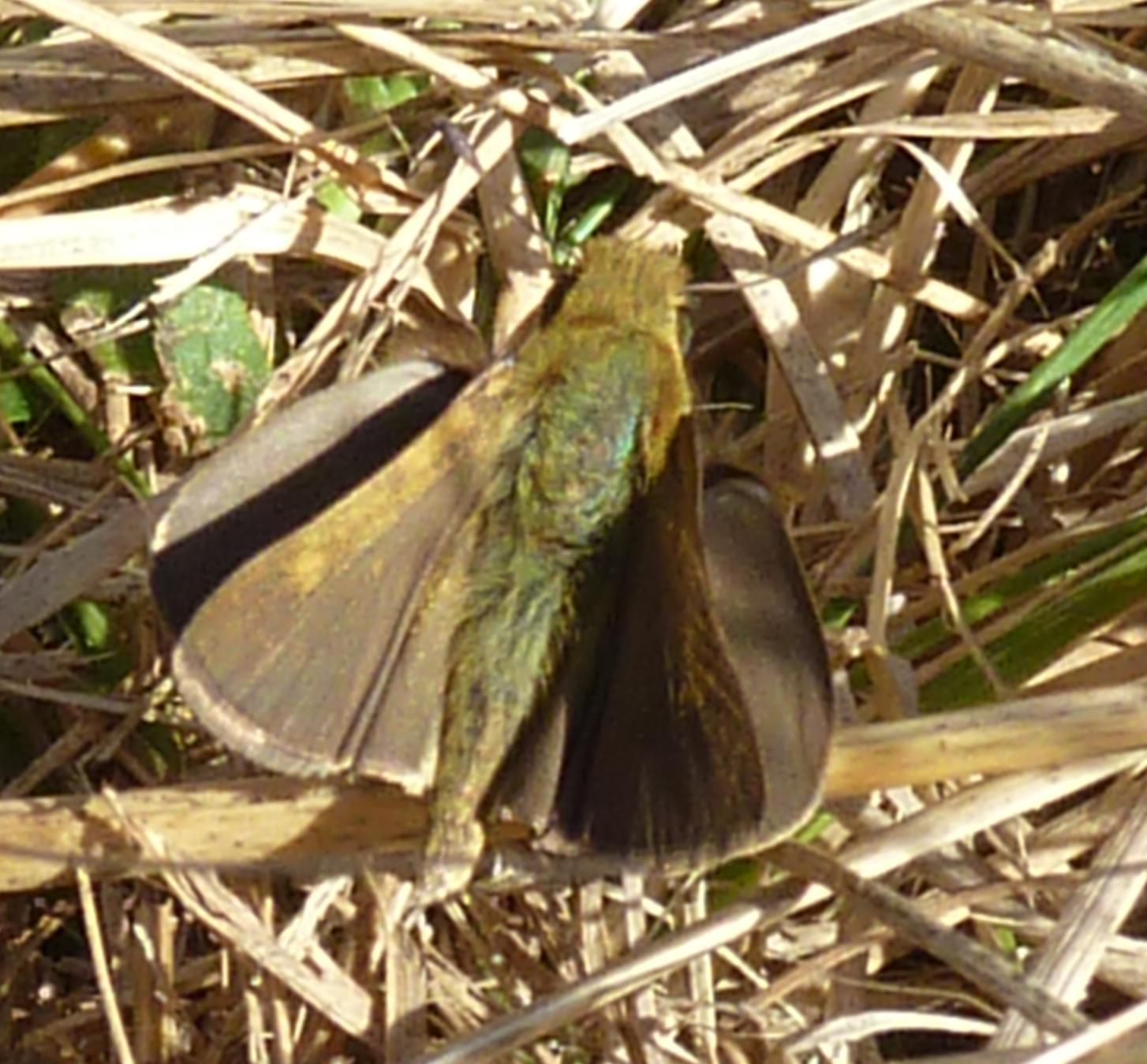

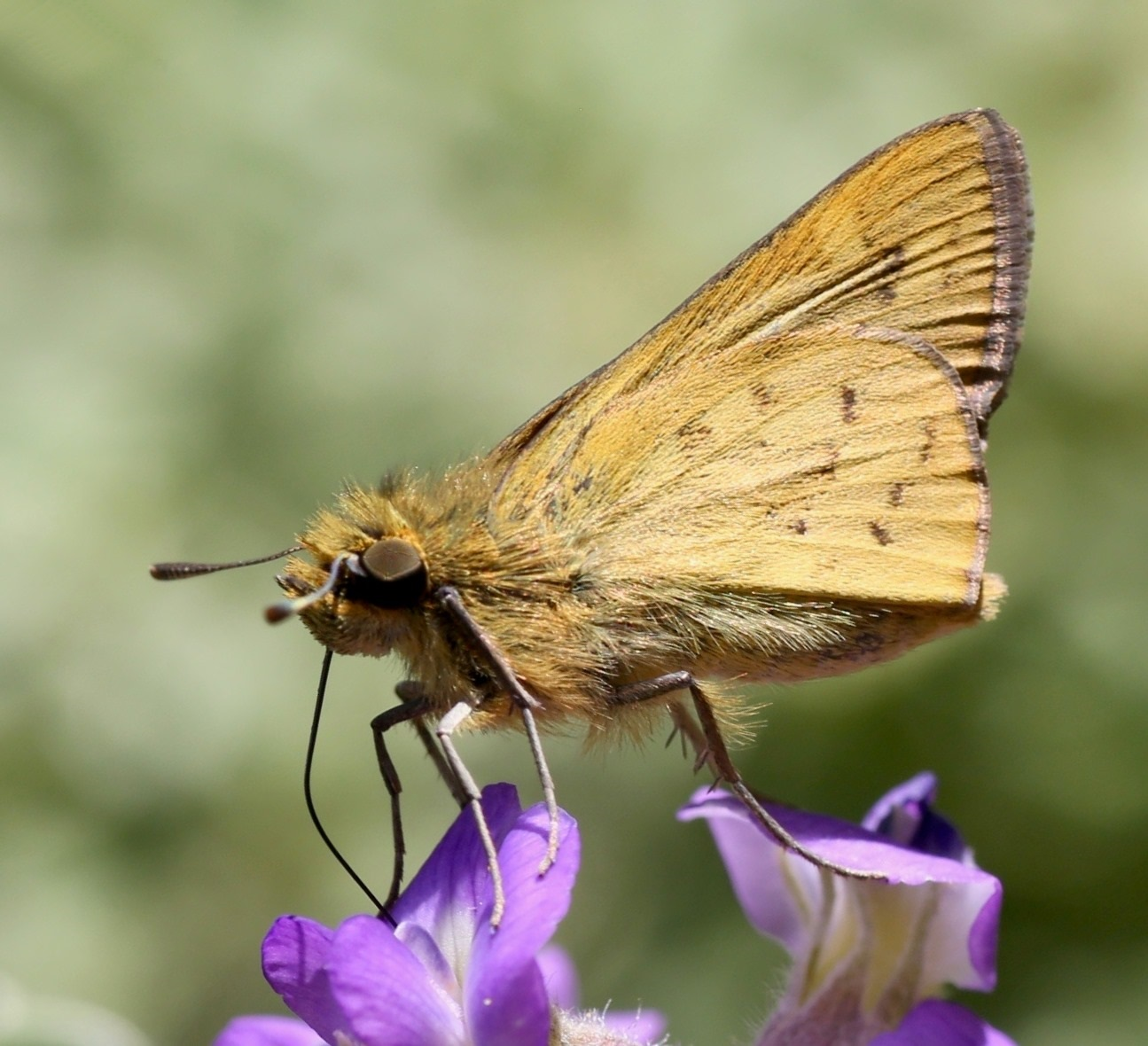

Scientific classification
- Kingdom: Animalia
- Phylum: Arthropoda
- Clade: Pancrustacea
- Class: Insecta
- Order: Lepidoptera
- Family: Hesperiidae
- Genus: Gegenes
- Species: G. niso

Binomial name
- Gegenes niso (Linnaeus, 1764)

Synonyms
- Papilio niso Linnaeus, 1764; Hesperia letterstedti Wallengren, 1857; Pamphila indica Mabille, 1883; Gegenes hottentota ocra Evans, 1937; Thymelicus brevicornis Plötz, 1884

= Gegenes niso =

Common Hottentot skipper

Species of butterfly

Gegenes niso, the common Hottentot skipper or plain Hottentot skipper, is a butterfly of the family Hesperiidae. It is found in Africa. It is found in a wide range of habitats, including savanna, grassland and open patches in forests.

The wingspan is 29–33 mm for males and 29–35 mm for females. Adults are on the wing year-round in warmer areas (with a peak from October to March) and from October to March in cooler areas.

The larvae feed on various grass species, namely Ehrharta species (including Ehrharta erecta), Pennisetum clandestinum, Zea and Cynodon species.

== Subspecies ==
- Gegenes niso niso

Range: southern Mozambique, Zimbabwe, Botswana, Namibia, Eswatini, Lesotho and South Africa, where it occurs in Limpopo, Mpumalanga, North West, Gauteng, Free State, KwaZulu-Natal, Eastern and Western Cape provinces

- Gegenes niso brevicornis (Plötz, 1884) – plain Hottentot

Range: west, central and east Africa, including Senegal, Gambia, Guinea-Bissau, Guinea, Sierra Leone, Liberia, Ivory Coast, Ghana, Nigeria and Zambia

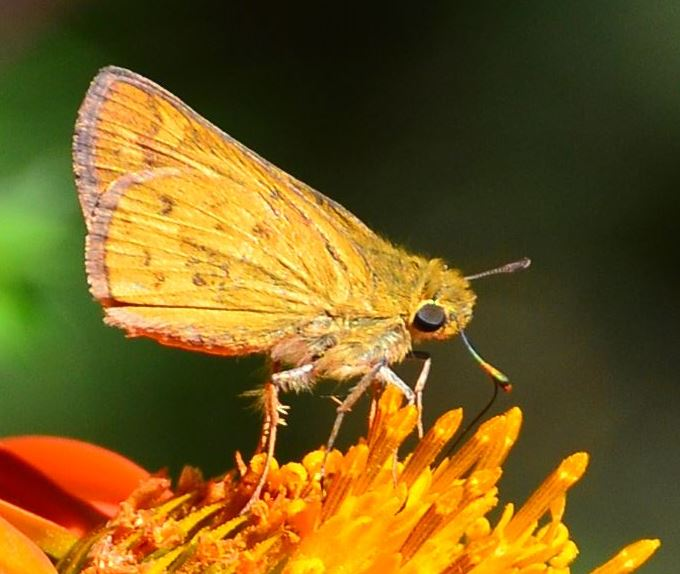
G. niso on red sunflower

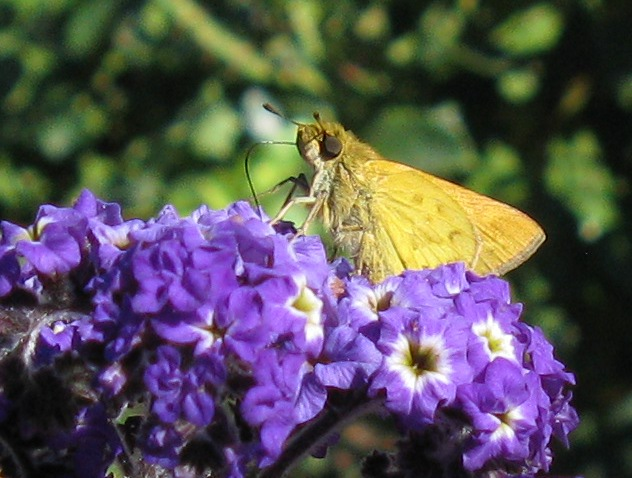
G. niso on garden heliotrope

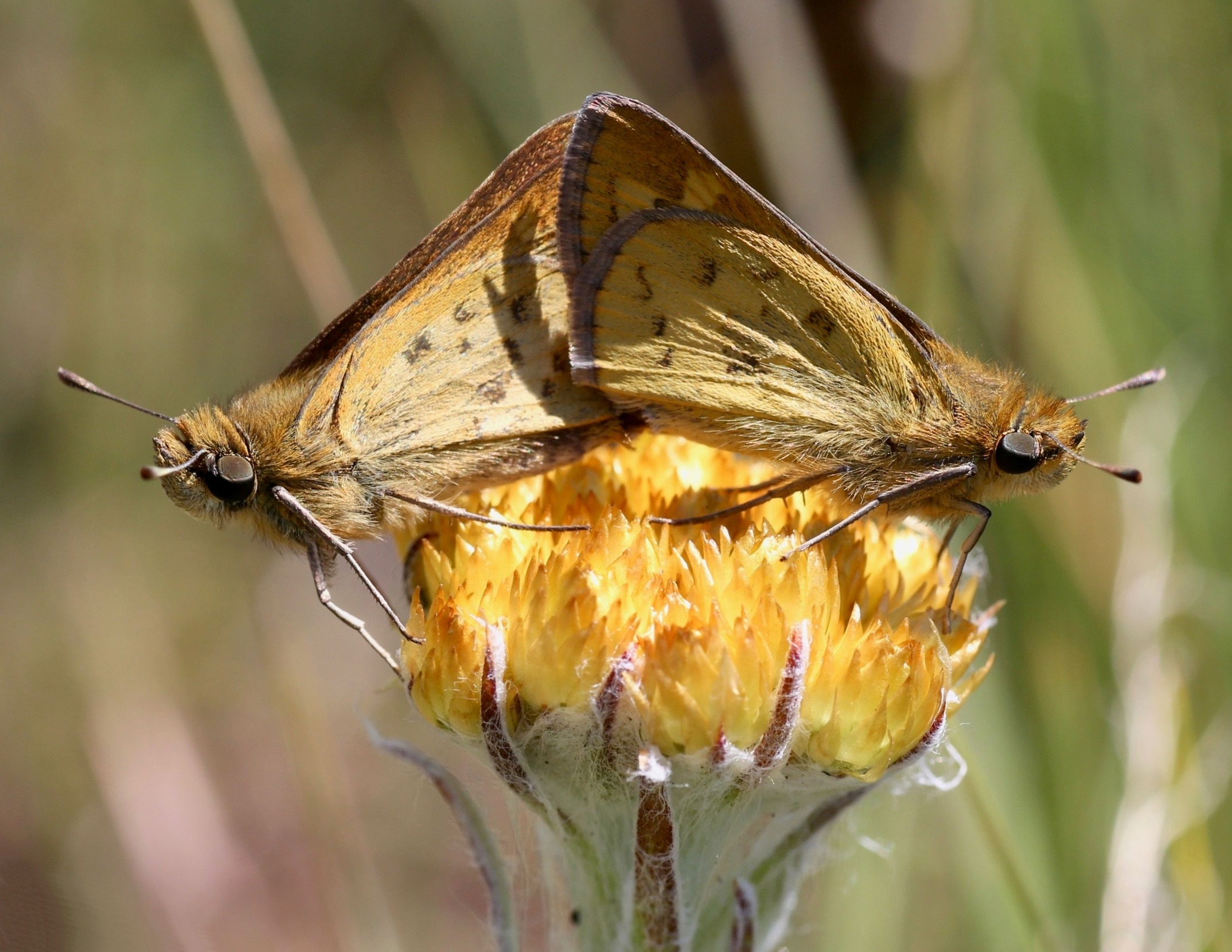
Mating pair on Helichrysum auriceps
