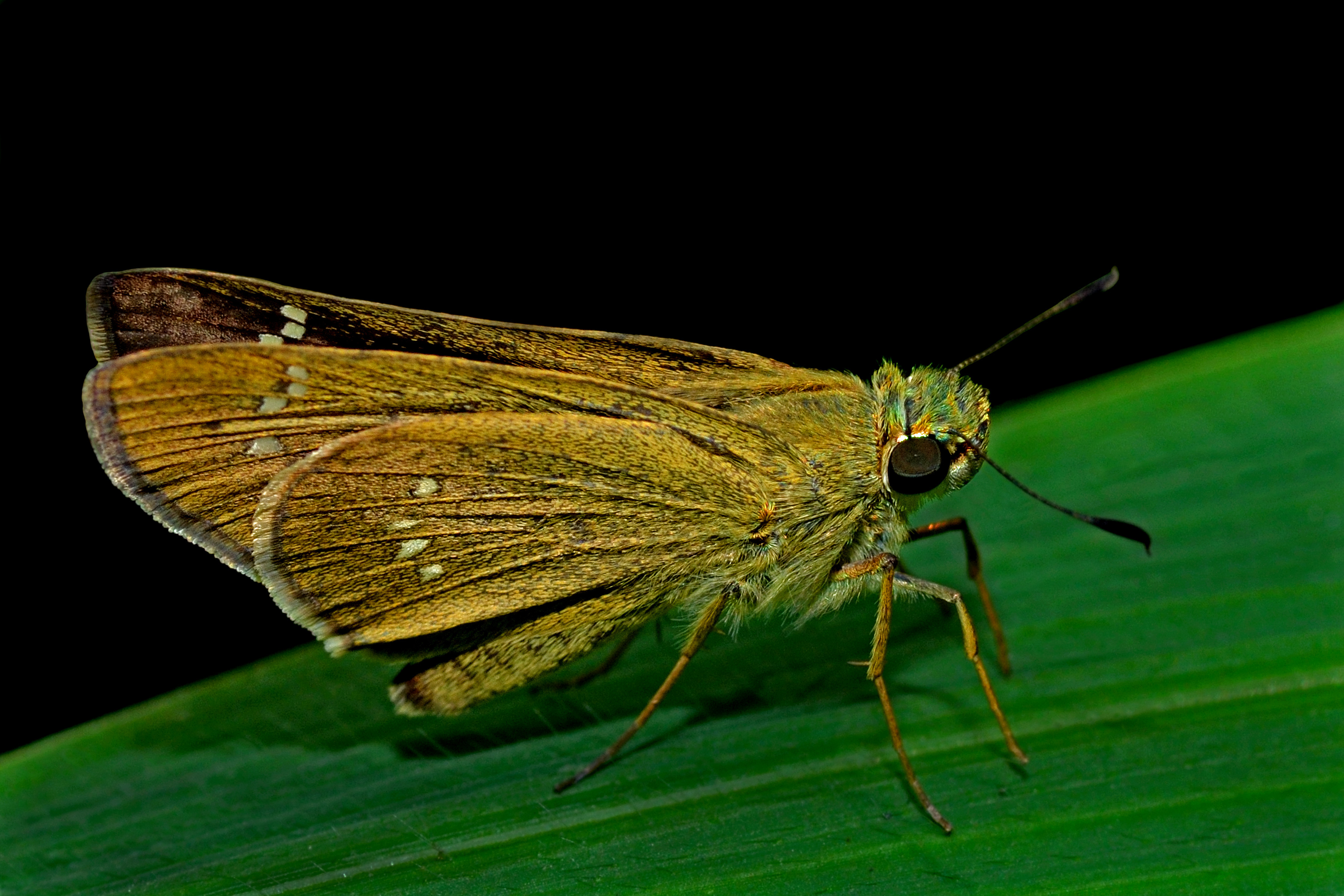

Scientific classification
- Kingdom: Animalia
- Phylum: Arthropoda
- Class: Insecta
- Order: Lepidoptera
- Family: Hesperiidae
- Tribe: Baorini
- Genus: Pseudoborbo; Lee, 1966

= Pseudoborbo =

Genus of butterflies

Pseudoborbo is an Indomalayan genus of skippers in the family Hesperiidae. The genus is monotypic containing the single species Pseudoborbo bevani (Moore, 1878) found in South India, Assam, Burma, Peninsular Thailand, Sumatra and Yunnan. The larva feeds on Imperata, Oryza, Paspalum, Saccharum.
