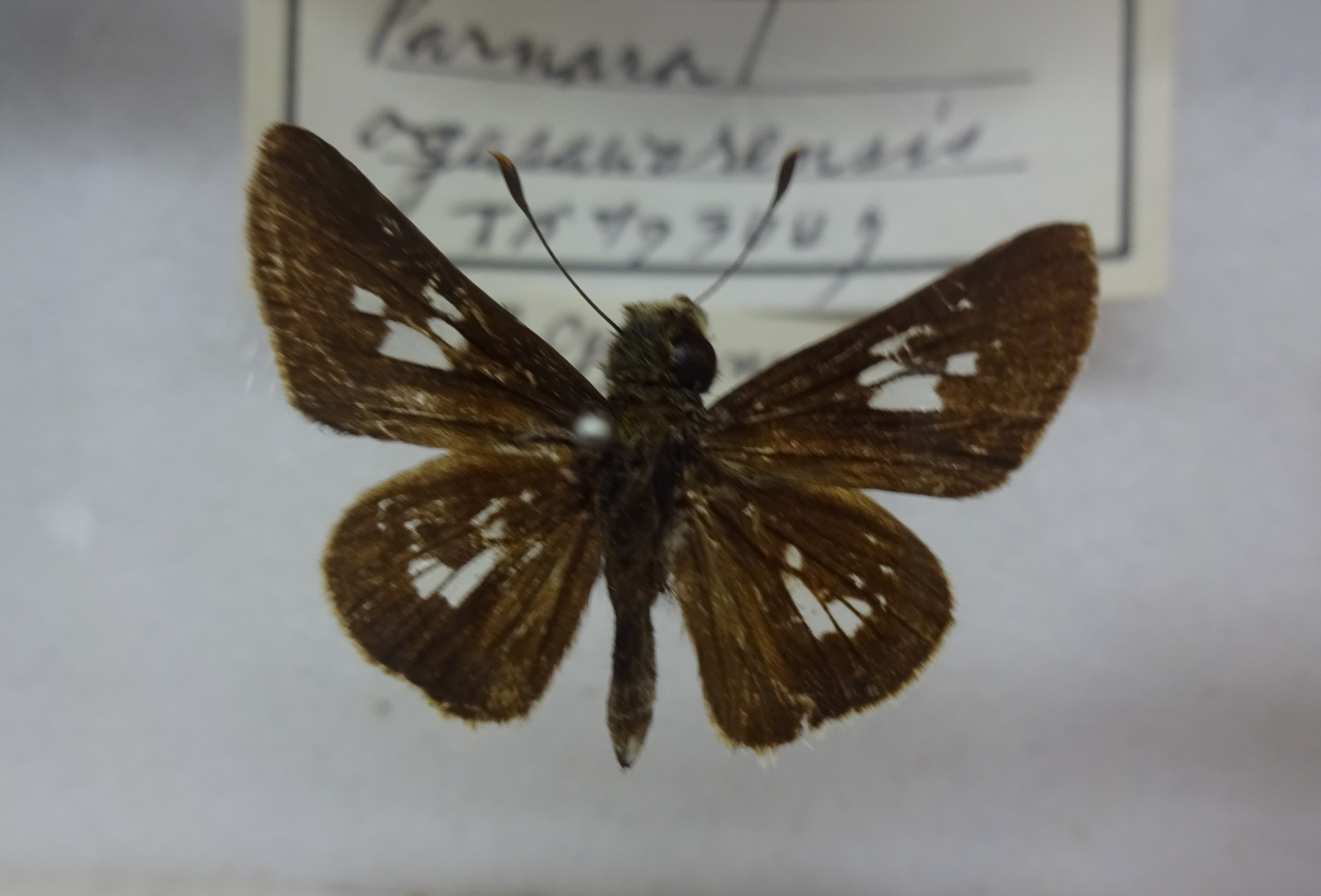

Scientific classification
- Kingdom: Animalia
- Phylum: Arthropoda
- Class: Insecta
- Order: Lepidoptera
- Family: Hesperiidae
- Genus: Parnara
- Species: P. ogasawarensis

Binomial name
- Parnara ogasawarensis Matsumura, 1906

= Parnara ogasawarensis =

Species of butterfly

Parnara ogasawarensis is a butterfly in the family Hesperiidae (Hesperiinae). It is endemic to the Bonin Islands of Japan.
