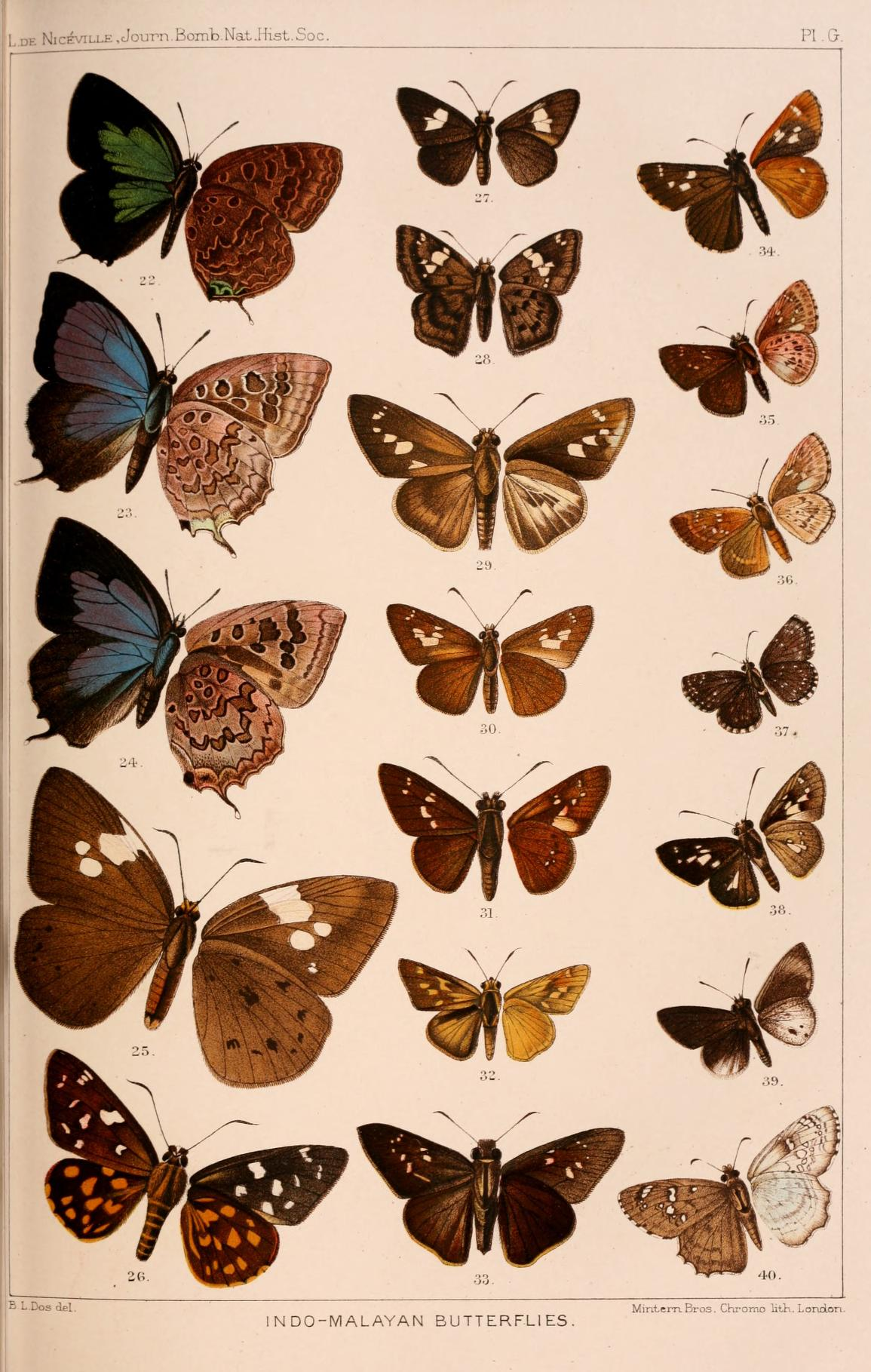
- Figure 29 in Lionel de Nicéville's 1891 "On New and Little-Known Butterflies from the Indo-Malayan Region"

Scientific classification
- Kingdom: Animalia
- Phylum: Arthropoda
- Class: Insecta
- Order: Lepidoptera
- Family: Hesperiidae
- Genus: Iton
- Species: I. watsonii

Binomial name
- Iton watsonii (de Nicéville, [1890])

Synonyms
- Parnara watsonii de Nicéville, 1890

= Iton watsonii =

Species of butterfly

Iton watsonii is a butterfly in the family Hesperiidae. It was described by Lionel de Nicéville in 1890. It is endemic to Burma in the Indomalayan realm.
