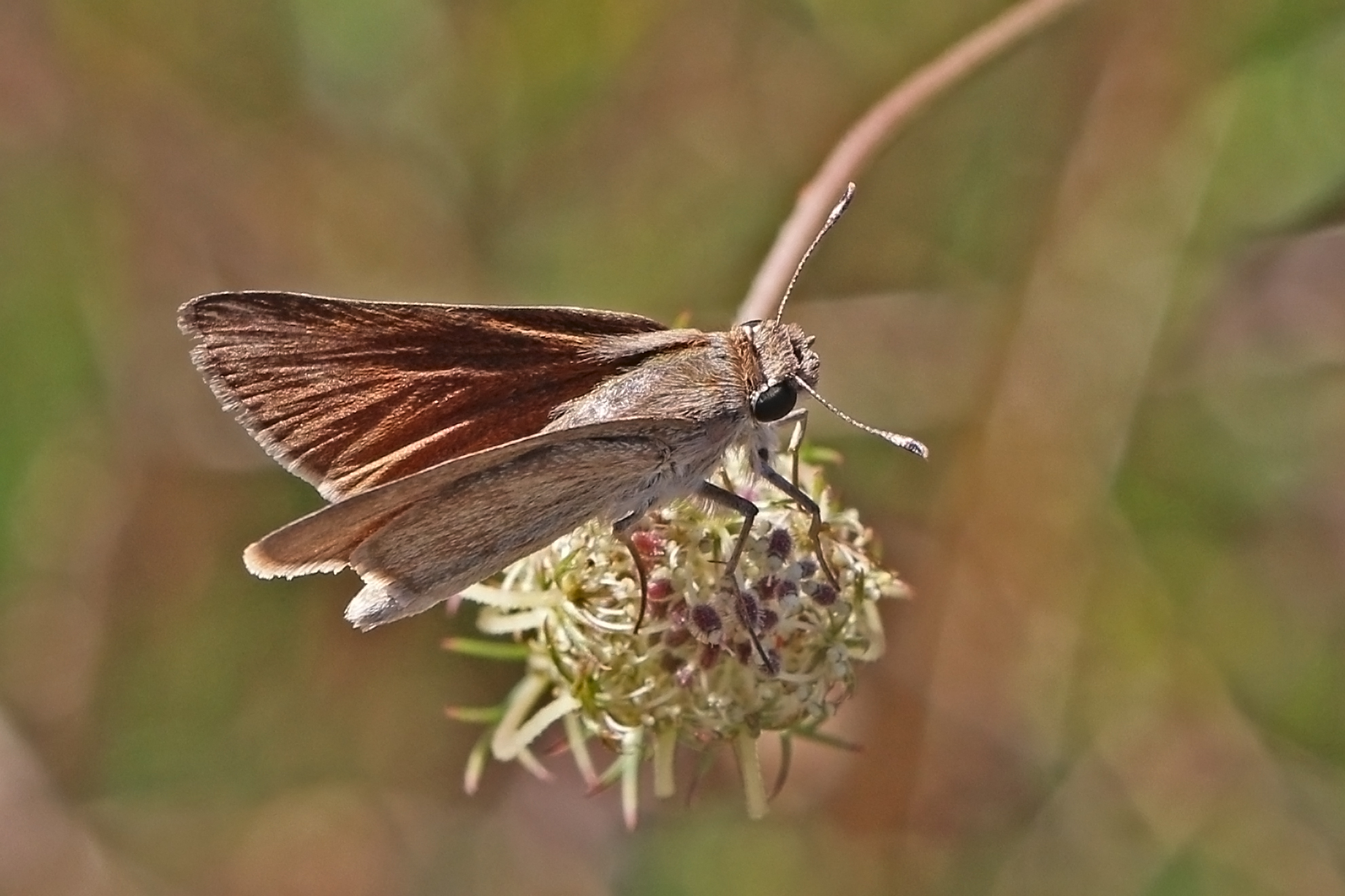

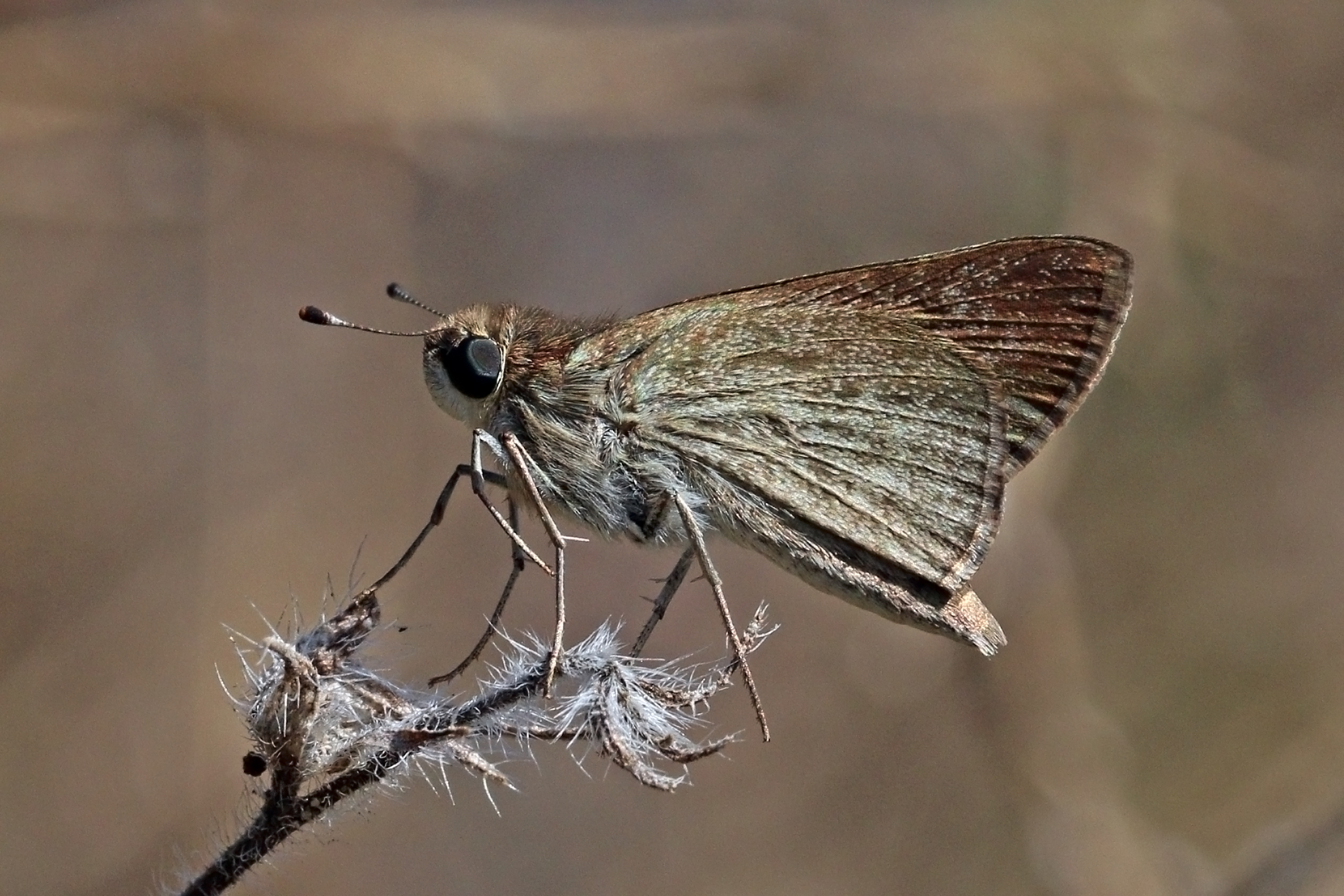
- both in Sithonia, Greece

Conservation status
- Least Concern (IUCN 3.1)

Scientific classification
- Kingdom: Animalia
- Phylum: Arthropoda
- Clade: Pancrustacea
- Class: Insecta
- Order: Lepidoptera
- Family: Hesperiidae
- Genus: Gegenes
- Species: G. pumilio

Binomial name
- Gegenes pumilio (Hoffmannsegg, 1804)

Synonyms
- Papilio pumilio Hoffmannsegg, 1804; Papilio aetna Boisduval, 1840; Philoodus lefebvrii Rambur, 1842; Philoodus lefebvrii Rambur, 1840; Gegenes pygmaeus Cyrillo, 1787; Gegenes aetna Boisduval, 1840; Gegenes lefebvrei Rambur, 1840; Pamphila gambica Mabille, 1878; Pamphila occulta Trimen, 1891; Parnara ursula Holland, 1896

= Gegenes pumilio =

Species of butterfly

Gegenes pumilio, the pigmy skipper or dark Hottentot, is a butterfly of the family Hesperiidae. It is found from the coasts of the Mediterranean Sea through Anatolia to the Himalaya and southwards through Africa to Madagascar.

The length of the forewings is about 14 mm. Adults are on wing from April to October in multiple generations.

The larvae feed on various grasses, including Gramineae species as well as Pennisetum clandestinum, Ehrharta (including Ehrharta erecta) and Cynodon species.

== Subspecies ==
- Gegenes pumilio pumilio (southern Europe, Middle East, India, United Arab Emirates, Saudi Arabia, Yemen, Oman)
- Gegenes pumilio gambica (Mabille, 1878) (Africa, Arabia to Lebanon, Turkey to northern Pakistan, Kashmir)
- Gegenes pumilio monochroa (Rebel, 1907) (Yemen: Socotra)
