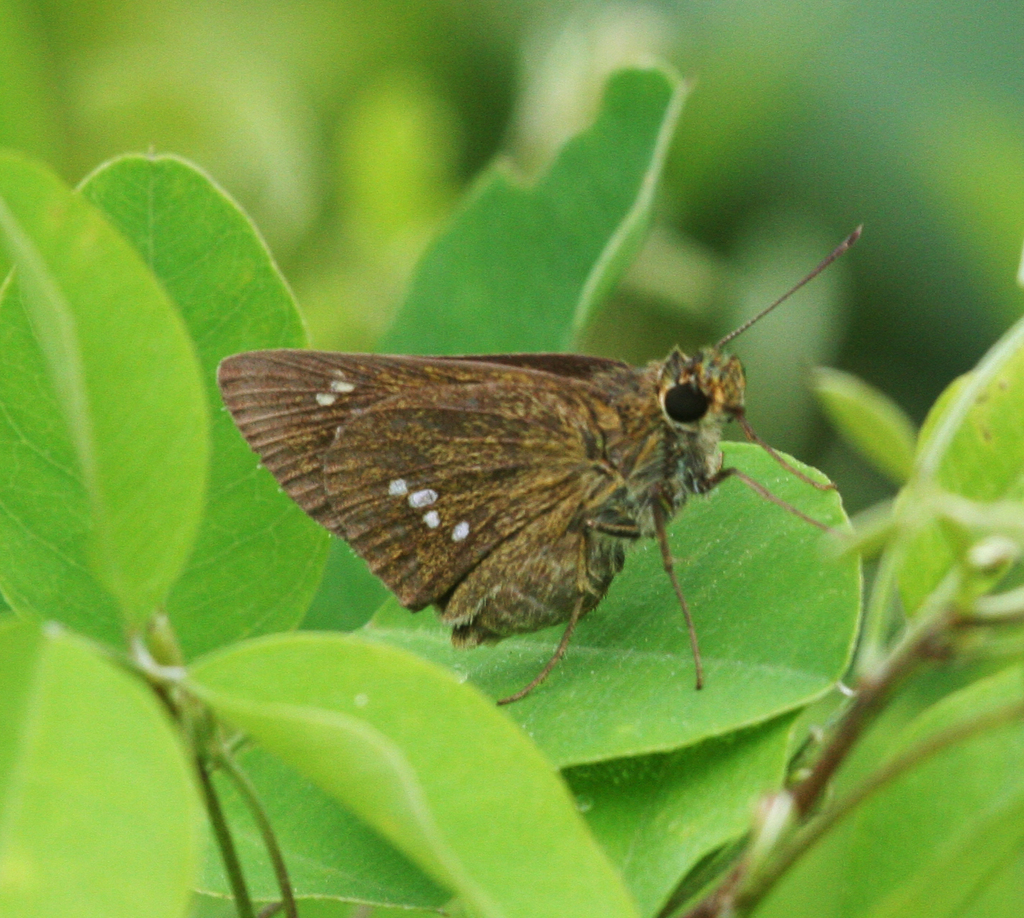

Scientific classification
- Kingdom: Animalia
- Phylum: Arthropoda
- Class: Insecta
- Order: Lepidoptera
- Family: Hesperiidae
- Genus: Polytremis
- Species: P. zina

Binomial name
- Polytremis zina Evans, 1932

= Polytremis zina =

Species of butterfly

Polytremis zina is a diurnal species of Lepidoptera belonging to the genus Polytremis that can be found throughout east Asia. It was first described by William Harry Evans in 1932. Polytremis zina contains the following subspecies:

- Zinaida zina asahinai
- Zinaida zina taiwana
