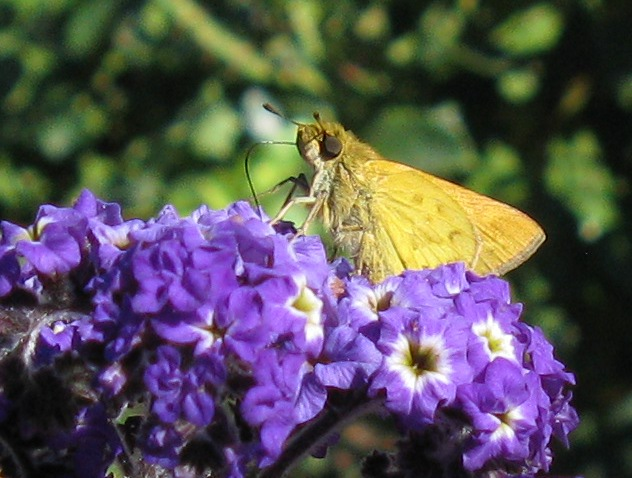
- G. niso on garden Heliotropium

Scientific classification
- Kingdom: Animalia
- Phylum: Arthropoda
- Class: Insecta
- Order: Lepidoptera
- Family: Hesperiidae
- Tribe: Baorini
- Genus: Gegenes; Hübner, [1819]

Synonyms
- Philoodus Rambur, 1840

= Gegenes =

Genus of butterflies

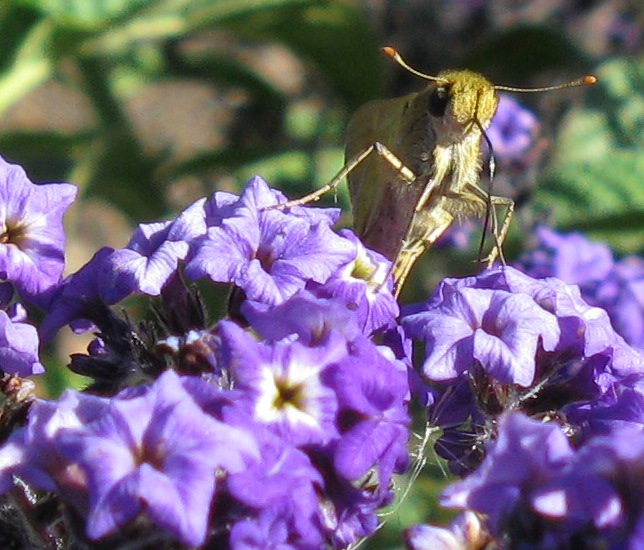
Common hottentot skipper on garden Heliotropium; anterior aspect

Gegenes is a genus of skippers in the family Hesperiidae.

== Species ==
- Gegenes hottentota (Latreille, 1824)
- Gegenes nostrodamus (Fabricius, 1793)
- Gegenes pumilio (Hoffmannsegg, 1804)
- Gegenes niso (Linnaeus, 1764)
