= Gegenes hottentota =

Scientific classification
- Kingdom: Animalia
- Phylum: Arthropoda
- Clade: Pancrustacea
- Class: Insecta
- Order: Lepidoptera
- Family: Hesperiidae
- Genus: Gegenes
- Species: G. hottentota

Binomial name
- Gegenes hottentota (Latreille, 1824)

Synonyms
- Hesperia hottentota Latreille, 1824; Pamphila obumbrata Trimen, 1891

Species of butterfly

Gegenes hottentota, the marsh Hottentot skipper, Hottentot skipper or Latreille's skipper, is a butterfly of the family Hesperiidae. It is found in Africa and south-western Arabia. It is notably documented to fly in Burkina Faso. The habitat consists of marshy areas with thick grass, especially in valleys.

The wingspan is 31–34 mm for males, and 31–36 mm for females. Adults are on wing year-round in warmer areas (with a peak from April to May).

The larvae feed on Oldenlandia corymbosa.
