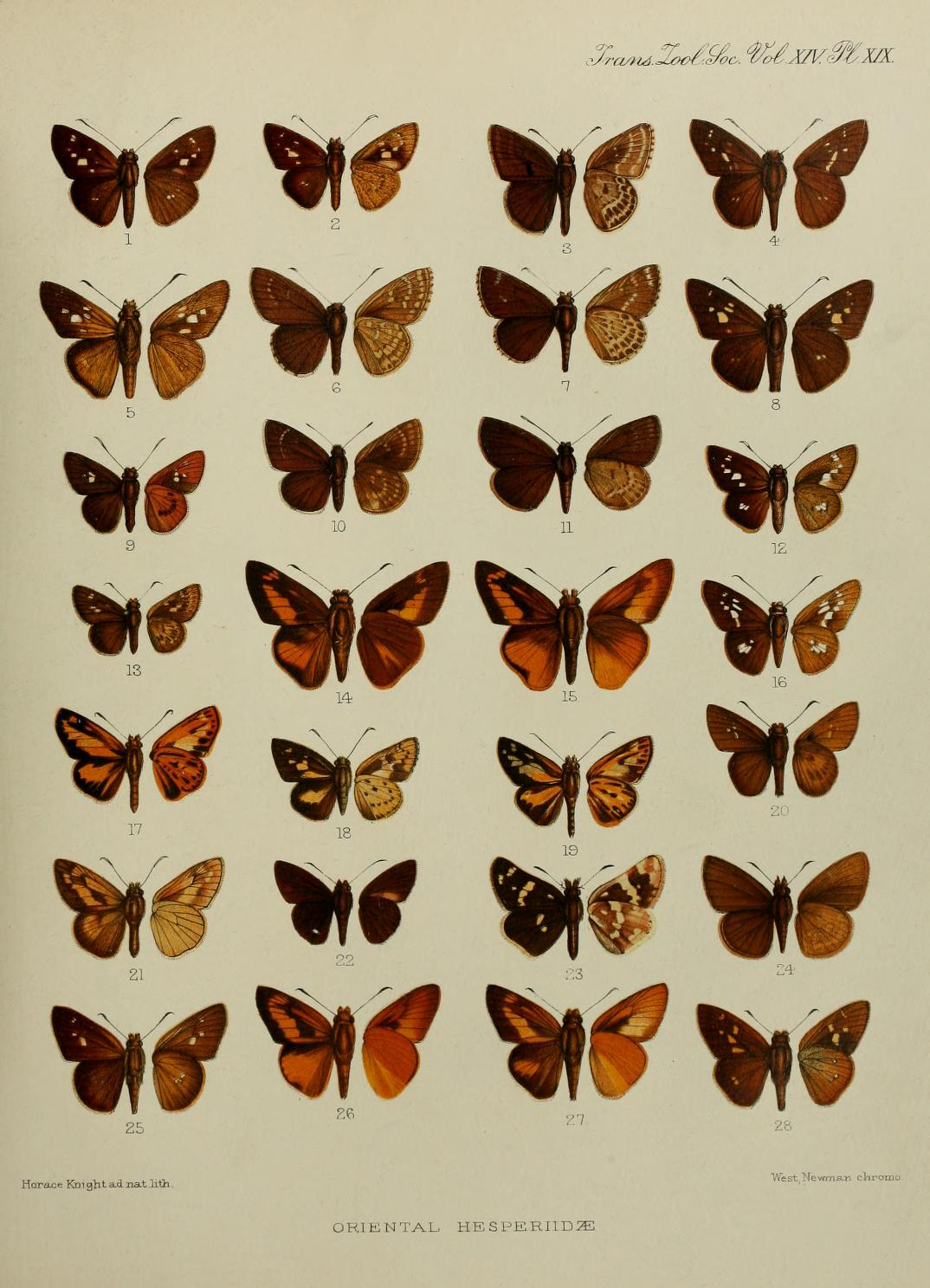
- Prusiana prusias (figure 14), Prusiana kuehni (figure 15)

Scientific classification
- Kingdom: Animalia
- Phylum: Arthropoda
- Class: Insecta
- Order: Lepidoptera
- Family: Hesperiidae
- Tribe: Baorini
- Genus: Prusiana; Evans, 1937

= Prusiana =

Genus of butterflies

Prusiana is an Indomalayan genus of grass skippers in the family Hesperiidae.

== Species ==
- Prusiana prusias (Felder, 1861)
  - P. p. prusias Sulawesi, Banggai, Sula Island, Salayar, Borneo
  - P. p. matinus (Fruhstorfer, 1911) Palawan, Philippines, Sangihe
- Prusiana kuehni (Plötz, 1886)
  - P. k. kuehni Sulawesi, Banggai Island
  - P. k. insularis (Elwes & Edwards, 1897) Pulo Laut
- Prusiana hercules (Mabille, 1889) Celebes
