= Baorini =

- Baoris farri

Scientific classification
- Kingdom: Animalia
- Phylum: Arthropoda
- Class: Insecta
- Order: Lepidoptera
- Family: Hesperiidae
- Subfamily: Hesperiinae
- Tribe: Baorini; Doherty, 1886

Tribe of butterflies

Baorini is a tribe in the Hesperiinae subfamily of skipper butterflies.

== Genera ==
- Baoris
- Borbo
- Brusa
- Caltoris
- Gegenes
- Iton
- Parnara
- Pelopidas
- Polytremis
- Prusiana
- Pseudoborbo
- Tsukiyamaia
- Zenonia
