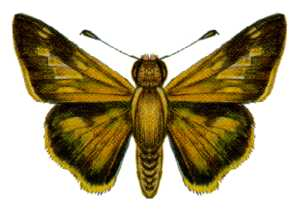

Scientific classification
- Kingdom: Animalia
- Phylum: Arthropoda
- Class: Insecta
- Order: Lepidoptera
- Family: Hesperiidae
- Genus: Parnara
- Species: P. amalia

Binomial name
- Parnara amalia (Semper, [1879])

Synonyms
- Hesperilla fulgidus Miskin, 1889; Pamphila amalia Semper, [1879]

= Parnara amalia =

Species of butterfly

Parnara amalia, the hyaline swift or orange swift, is a species of butterfly in the family Hesperiidae, the skippers. It occurs in Irian Jaya and Papua New Guinea, as well as the Australian states of New South Wales, the Northern Territory, and Queensland.

The butterfly has a wingspan of about 30 millimeters.

The larva feeds on grasses, including the common rice plant, Oryza sativa, and southern cutgrass (Leersia hexandra). This butterfly may play a role in the pollination of the cashew.
