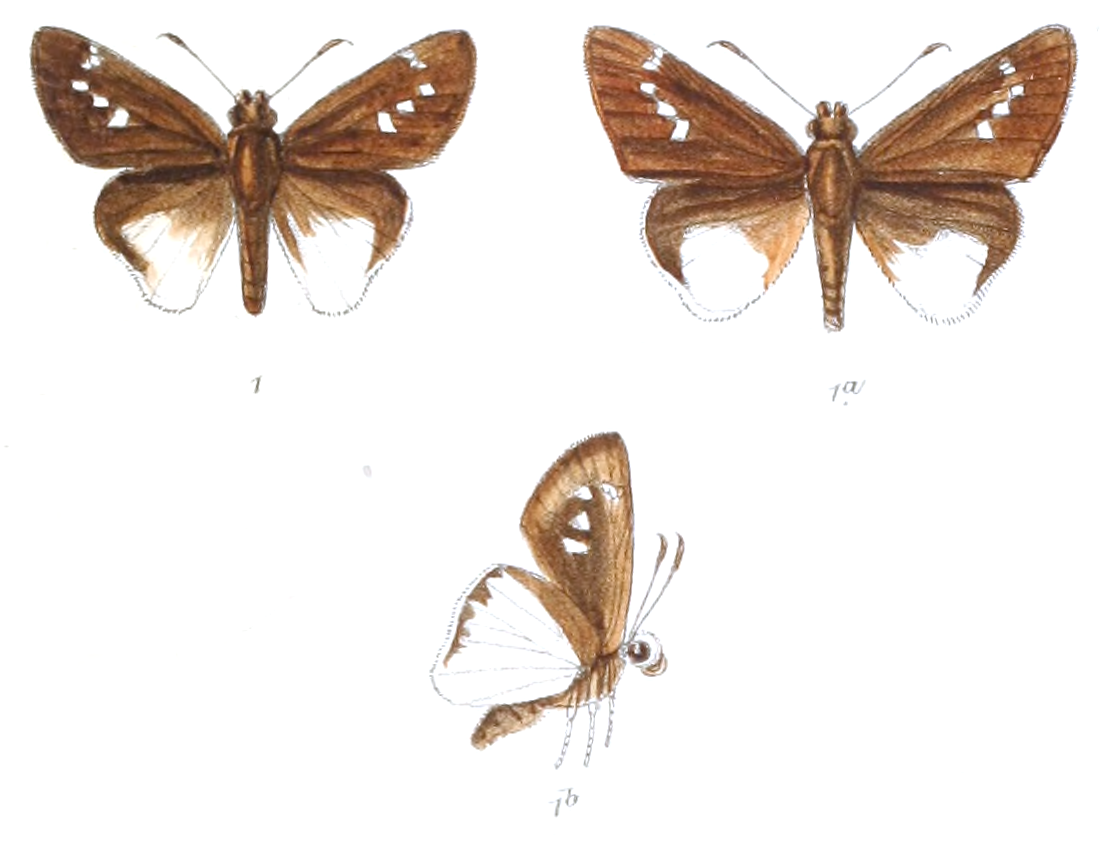
- Iton semamora

Scientific classification
- Kingdom: Animalia
- Phylum: Arthropoda
- Class: Insecta
- Order: Lepidoptera
- Family: Hesperiidae
- Tribe: Baorini
- Genus: Iton de Nicéville, 1895

= Iton (skipper) =

Genus of butterflies

Iton is a genus of grassskippers in the family Hesperiidae. It has two species, both found in the Indomalayan realm.

The genus was named by Lionel de Nicéville in 1895.

== Species ==
- Iton semamora (Moore, [1866]) Sikkim - Assam, Burma, Malaya
- Iton watsonii (de Nicéville, 1890) Burma
