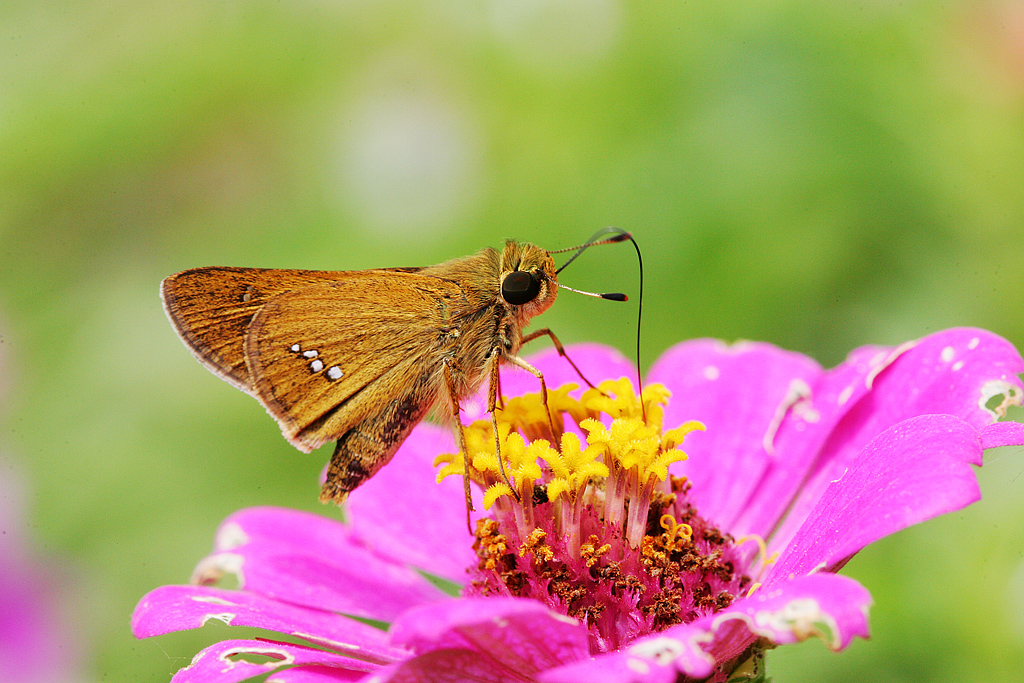

Scientific classification
- Kingdom: Animalia
- Phylum: Arthropoda
- Class: Insecta
- Order: Lepidoptera
- Family: Hesperiidae
- Genus: Parnara
- Species: P. guttata

Binomial name
- Parnara guttata (Bremer & Grey, 1852)

Synonyms
- Eudamus guttatus Bremer & Grey, 1852; Parnara guttata Chiba & Eliot, 1991

= Parnara guttata =

Species of butterfly

Parnara guttata, the common straight swift, is a butterfly of the family Hesperiidae. It is found in the Indomalayan realm, Amur (Russian Far East), eastern China, Japan, Taiwan, the Philippines, and Korea.

Its wingspan is about 40 mm.

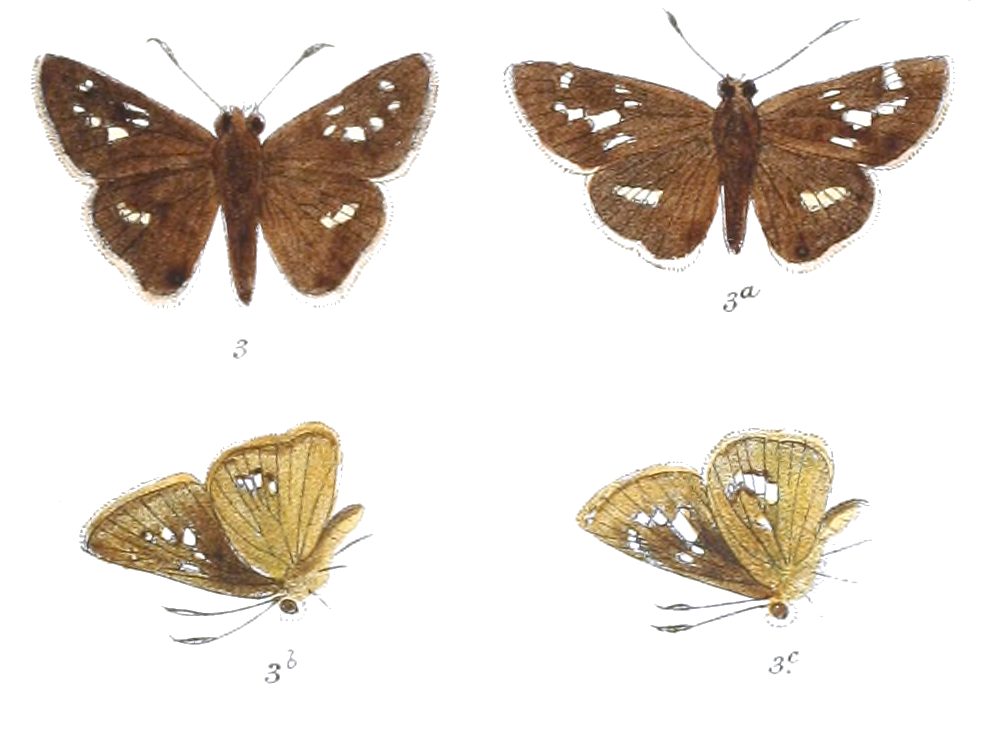

Panara guttata in Tokyo

Common straight swift larvae feed on various grasses, including rice.
