= List of butterflies of the United Arab Emirates =

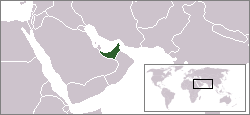
Location of the United Arab Emirates

This is a list of butterflies of the United Arab Emirates. Over 50 species are known from the United Arab Emirates.

== Papilionidae ==
=== Papilioninae ===
==== Papilionini ====
- Papilio machaon muetingi Seyer, 1976
- Papilio demoleus Linnaeus, 1758

== Pieridae - whites and yellows ==
=== Subfamily-Pierinae ===
- Belenois aurota (Fabricius, 1793) caper white
- Colotis amata (Cramer, 1775) small salmon Arab
- Colotis danae (Klug, 1829) scarlet tip
- Colotis fausta (Olivier, 1804) salmon Arab
- Colotis liagore (Klug, 1829) desert orange tip
- Colotis phisadia (Godart, 1819) blue spotted Arab
- Euchloe transcaspica amseli (Gross & Ebert 1975) white desert black tip

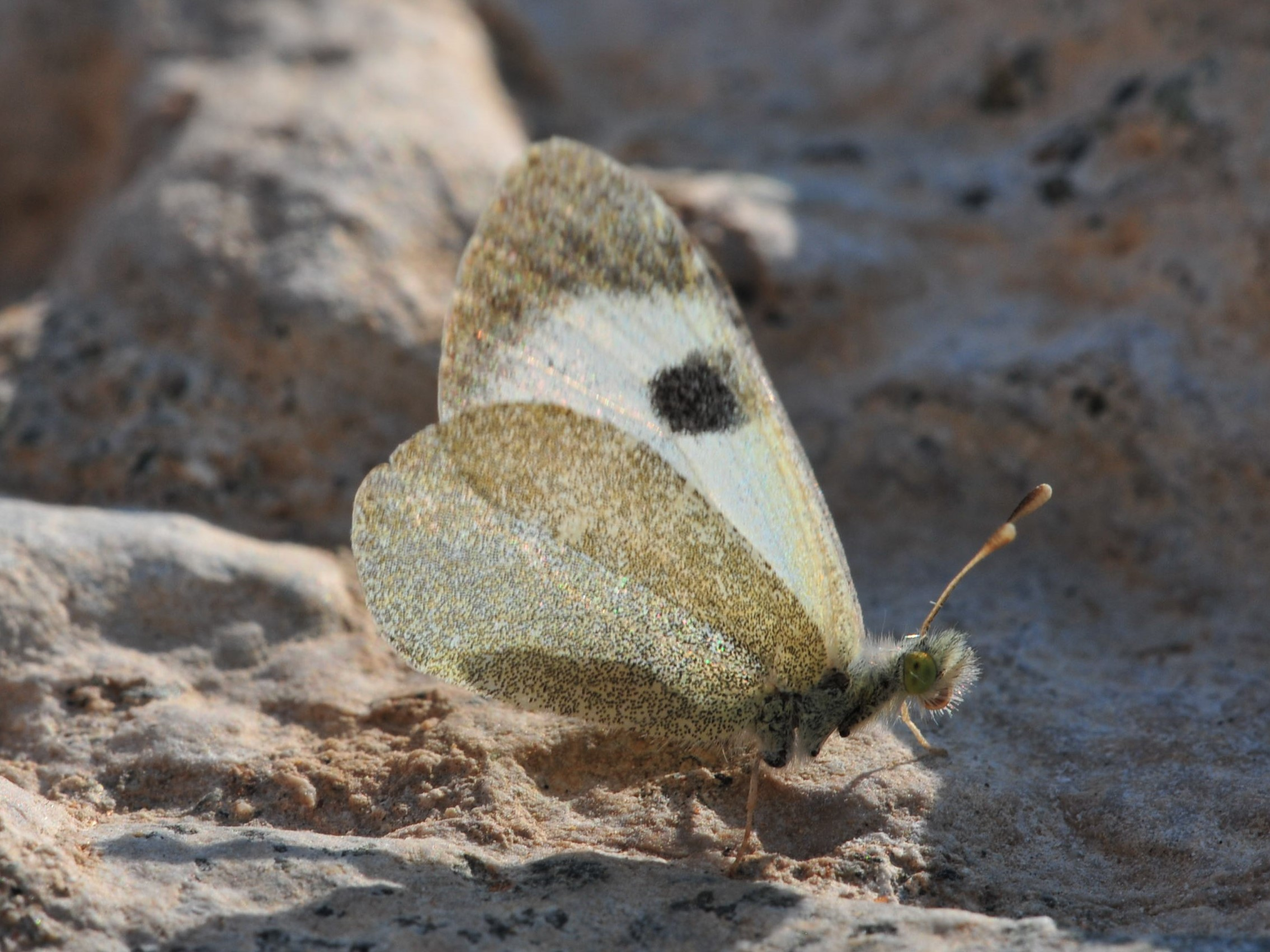
A white desert black tip Euchloe transcaspica amseli in the United Arab Emirates

- Euchloe belemia (Esper, 1800) green striped white
- Pieris krueperi (de Nicéville, 1883) Krueper's small white
- Pieris rapae (Le Cerf, 1913) small cabbage white
- Pontia glauconome (Klug, 1829) desert white

=== Sub-family Coliadinae - yellows and sulphurs ===
- Catopsilia florella (Fabricius, 1775) African emigrant
- Catopsilia pyranthe (Linnaeus, 1758) mottled emigrant
- Colias croceus (Geoffroy, 1785) clouded yellow
- Eurema hecabe solifera (Butler, 1875) common grass yellow

== Nymphalidae - brush-footed butterflies ==
=== Sub-family Danainae ===
- Danaus chrysippus (Linnaeus, 1758) plain tiger

=== Sub-family Nymphalinae ===
- Hypolimnas misippus (Linnaeus, 1764) diadem or danaid eggfly
- Junonia hierta Trimen, 1870 yellow pansy
- Junonia orithya Lang, 1884 blue pansy
- Vanessa cardui (Linnaeus, 1758) painted lady

=== Sub-family Satyrinae - browns ===
- Hipparchia parisatis (Kollar, 1849) white-edged rock brown
- Ypthima asterope (Klug, 1832) common three-ring
- Ypthima bolanica Marshall, 1882 Baluchi ringlet

== Lycaenidae - blues ==
=== Sub-family Theclinae ===
- Apharitis acamas hypargyros (Butler, 1886) tawny silverline
- Apharitis myrmecophila (Dumont, 1922) desert silverline
- Deudorix livia barnetti Libert, 2005 pomegranate playboy
- Myrina silenus Stoneham, 1937 fig blue

=== Sub-family Polyommatinae ===
- Agrodiaetus loewii (Walker, 1870) Loew's blue
- Anthene amarah amarah (Guerin, 1847) leaden ciliate blue
- Azanus jesous (Guerin, 1847) African babul blue
- Azanus ubaldus (Stoll, [1782]) desert babul blue
- Brephidium exilis (Boisduval, 1852) western pygmy blue
- Chilades galba (Lederer, 1855) Lederer's Cupid
- Chilades pandava (Horsfield, 1829) cycad Cupid or plains Cupid
- Chilades parrhasius (Fabricius, 1793) small Cupid
- Chilades trochylus (Freyer, 1845) grass jewel
- Euchrysops cnejus (Fabricius, 1793) gram blue
- Lampides boeticus (Linnaeus, 1767) pea blue
- Pseudophilotes vicrama (Christoph, 1887) eastern baton blue
- Tarucus balkanicus (Freyer, 1844) Balkan Pierrot
- Tarucus rosacea (Austat, 1885) Mediterranean Pierrot
- Zizeeria karsandra (Moore, 1865) Asian grass blue
- Zizula hylax (Fabricius, 1775) tiny grass blue

== Hesperiidae-skippers ==
=== Sub-family Coeliadinae ===
- Pyrrhiades anchises (Butler, 1861) giant skipper

=== Sub-family Pyriginae – grizzled skippers ===
- Gomalia elma (Trimen, 1862) African mallow skipper / marbled skipper
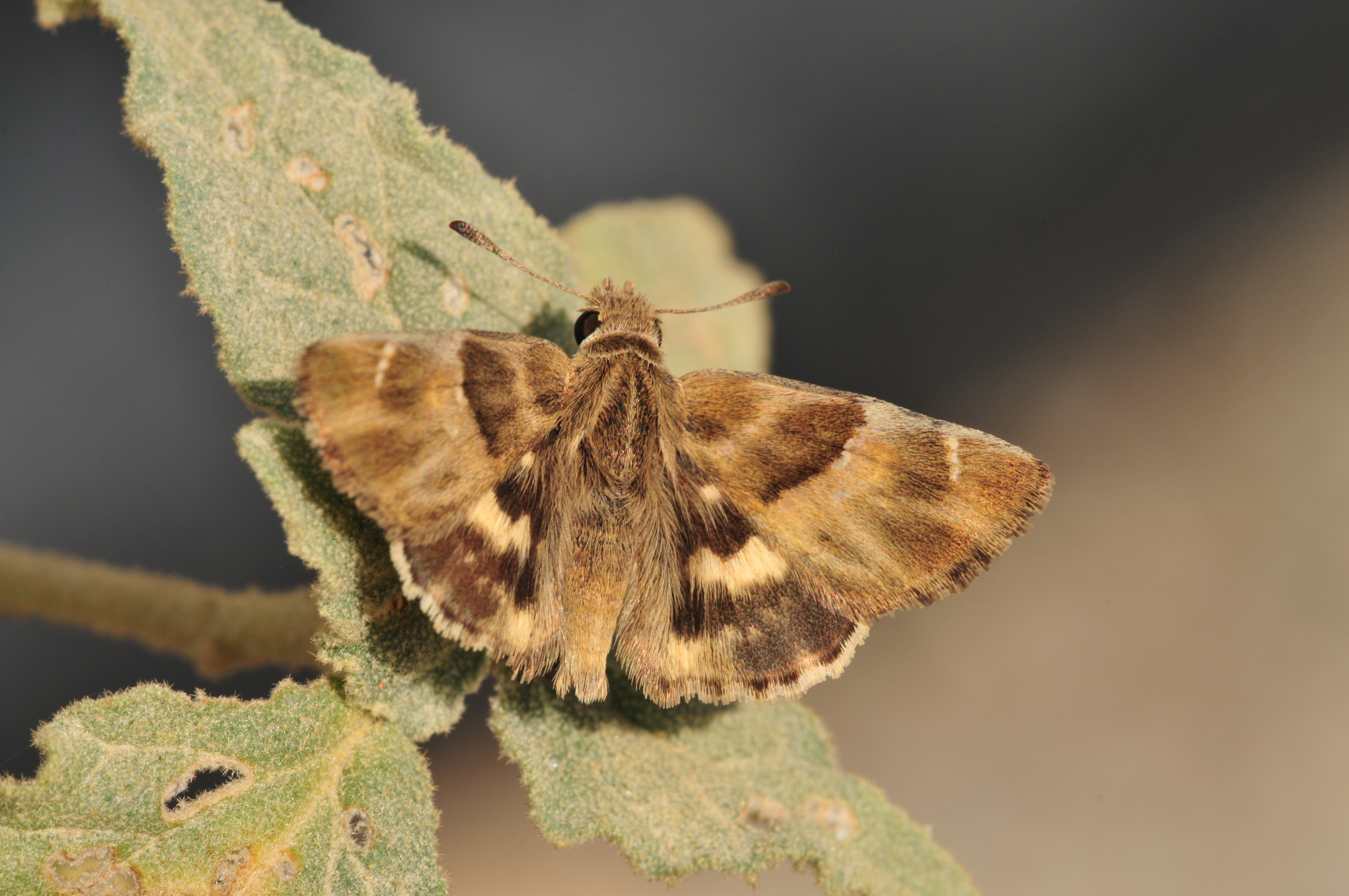
  Gomalia elma in the United Arab Emirates
- Spialia colotes (de Jong, 1978) Transvaal grizzled skipper
- Spialia doris (Walker, 1870) desert grizzled skipper
- Spialia mafa (Trimen, 1870) Mafa grizzled skipper
- Spialia mangana (Rebel, 1899) Arabian grizzled skipper

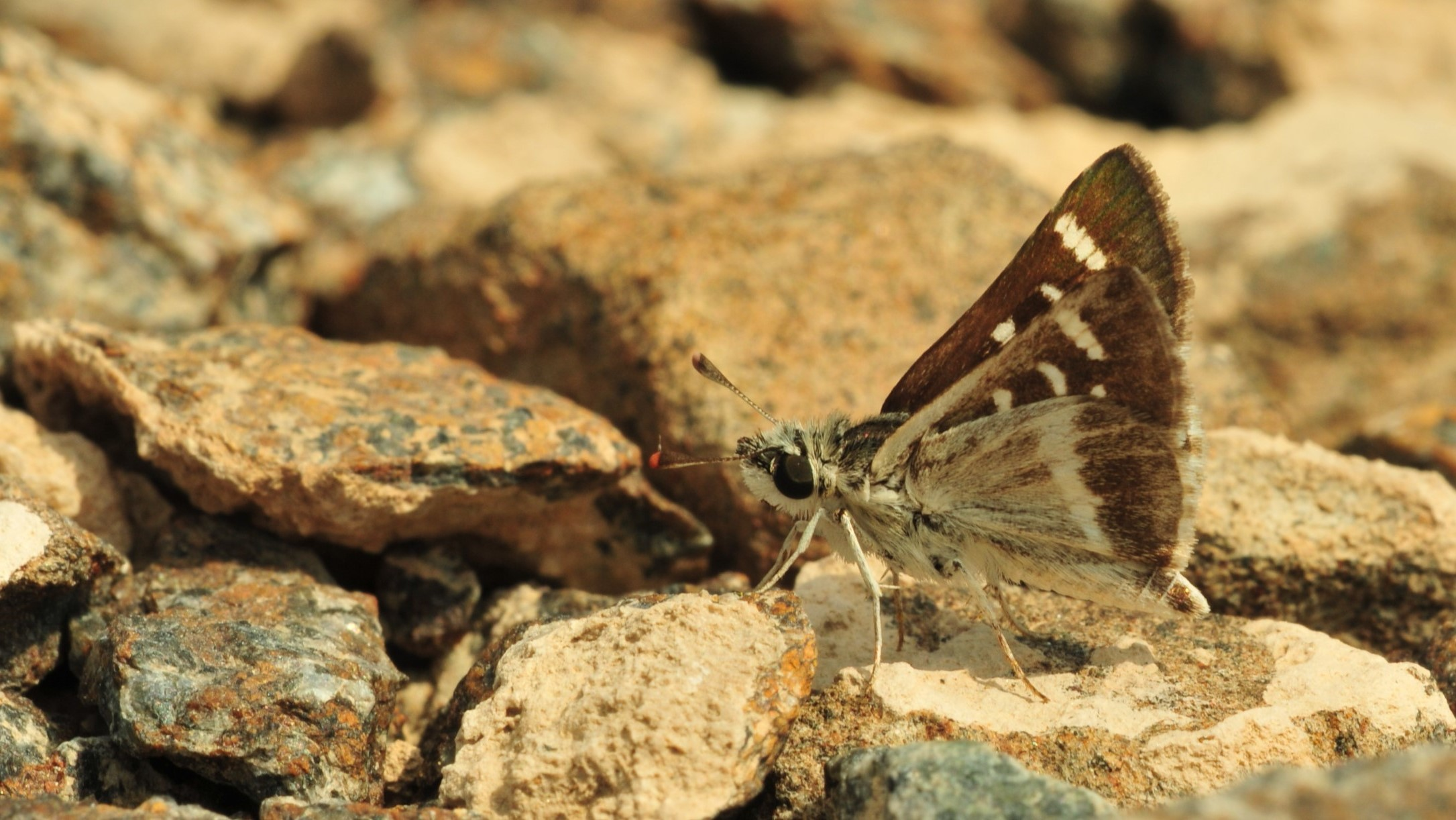
Arabian grizzled skipper in United Arab Emirates

- Spialia zebra (Higgins, 1924) zebra grizzled skipper

=== Sub-family Hesperiinae – grass skippers ===
- Gegenes nostrodamus (Fabricius, 1793) Mediterranean skipper
- Gegenes pumilio (Hoffmannsegg, 1804) pygmy skipper
- Pelopidas mathias (Fabricius, 1798) black-branded swift
- Pelopidas thrax (Hübner, 1821) white-branded swift

== See also ==
- List of moths of the United Arab Emirates
- Wildlife of the United Arab Emirates
