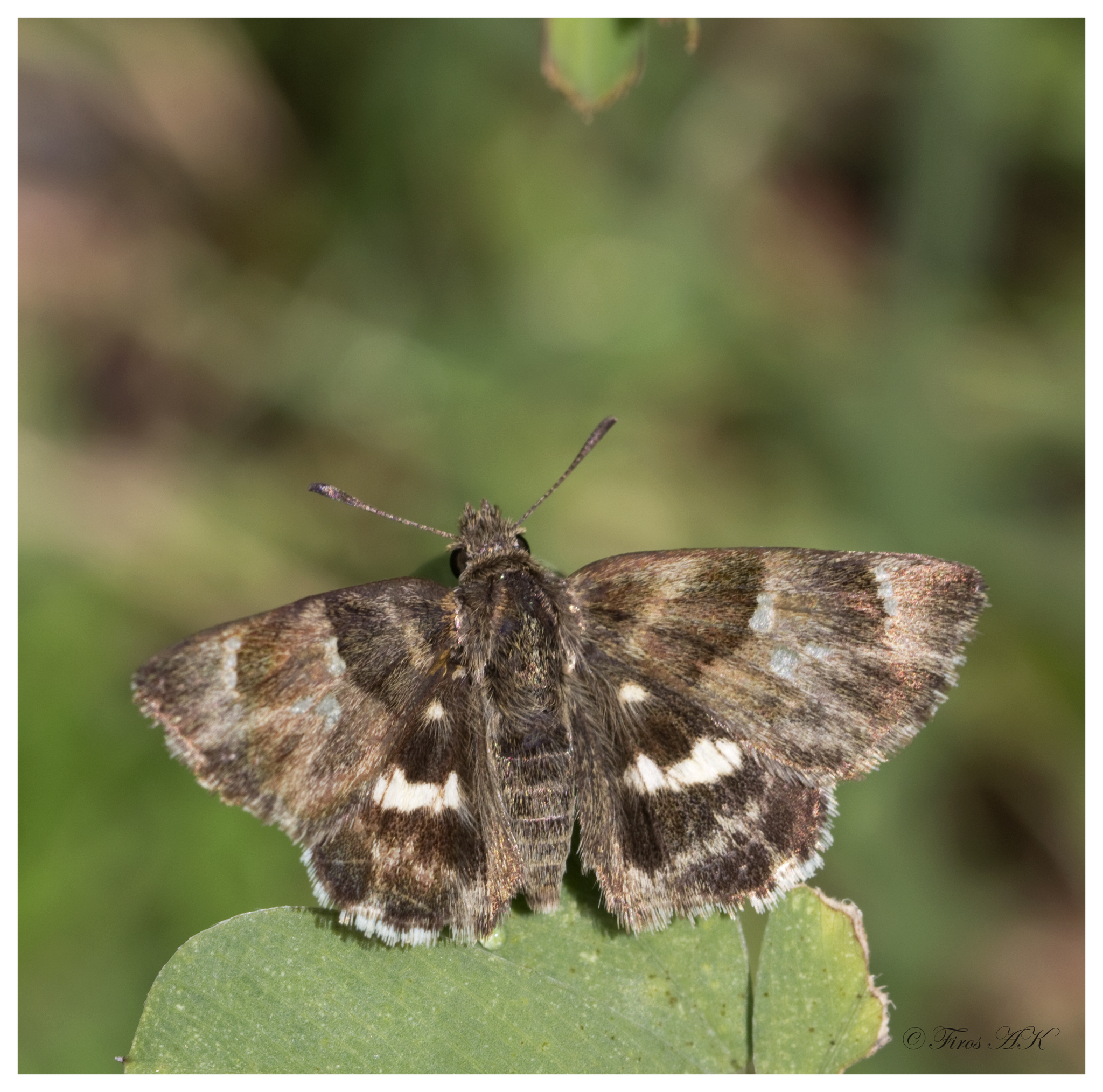
- Gomalia albofasciata, Asian marbled skipper, India

Scientific classification
- Kingdom: Animalia
- Phylum: Arthropoda
- Class: Insecta
- Order: Lepidoptera
- Family: Hesperiidae
- Genus: Gomalia
- Species: G. albofasciata

Binomial name
- Gomalia albofasciata Moore, 1879

= Gomalia albofasciata =

Species of butterfly

Gomalia albofasciata, the Asian marbled skipper, is a species of spread-wing skipper in the butterfly family Hesperiidae. It is found in India and Sri Lanka.

This species was formerly a subspecies of Gomalia elma, but was elevated in rank to species as a result of genomic research published in 2020.
