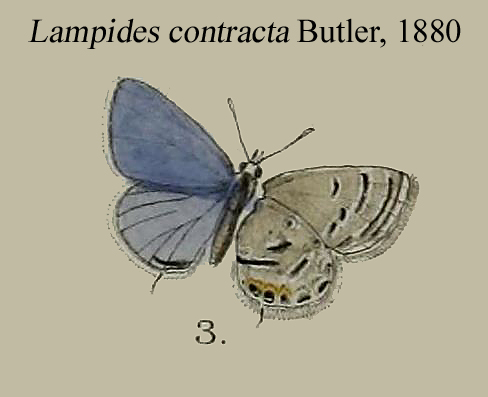

Scientific classification
- Domain: Eukaryota
- Kingdom: Animalia
- Phylum: Arthropoda
- Class: Insecta
- Order: Lepidoptera
- Family: Lycaenidae
- Genus: Luthrodes
- Species: L. contracta

Binomial name
- Luthrodes contracta (Butler, 1880)

Synonyms
- Lampides contracta Butler, 1880; Euchrysops contracta (Butler, 1880); Chilades contracta (Butler, 1880); Chilades lempkei Blom, 1979

= Luthrodes contracta =

Species of butterfly

Luthrodes contracta, the small Cupid, is a small butterfly that belongs to the lycaenids or blues family. It is found in southern Turan, southern Ghissar, Iran, Afghanistan, Pakistan, Sri Lanka and southern, central and north-west India. The species was first described by Arthur Gardiner Butler in 1880.

== See also ==
- List of butterflies of India
- List of butterflies of India (Lycaenidae)
