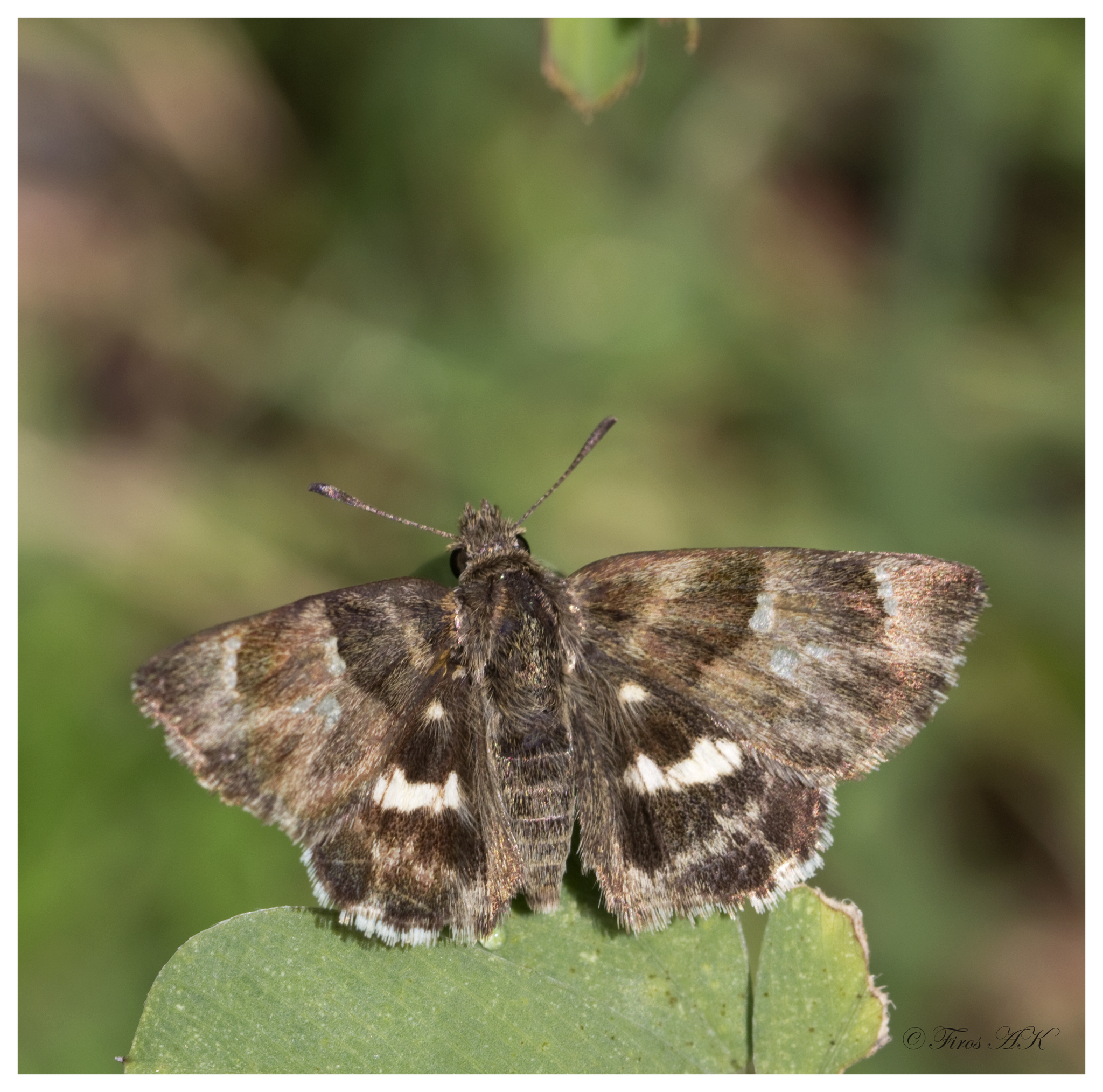
- Gomalia albofasciata, Asian Marbled Skipper, India

Scientific classification
- Kingdom: Animalia
- Phylum: Arthropoda
- Clade: Pancrustacea
- Class: Insecta
- Order: Lepidoptera
- Family: Hesperiidae
- Subfamily: Pyrginae
- Tribe: Carcharodini
- Genus: Gomalia; Moore, 1879

Synonyms
- Tavetana Picard, 1949

= Gomalia =

Genus of butterflies

Gomalia is a genus of marbled skippers in the butterfly family Hesperiidae. There are three described species in Gomalia.

Gomalia albofasciata was formerly considered subspecies of Gomalia elma, and Gomalia jeanneli was formerly considered a synonym of Gomalia elma. They were both reinstated as full species as a result of genomic research published in 2020.

== Species ==
These species belong to the genus Gomalia:

- Gomalia albofasciata Moore, 1879 (Asian marbled skipper)
- Gomalia elma (Trimen, 1862) (green-marbled skipper or African marbled skipper)
- Gomalia jeanneli (Picard, 1949)
- Gomalia westafra (Grishin, 2025)

Torben Larsen developed a species numbering system for his 2005 publication Butterflies of West Africa. The species G. elma was #1270. The 'Larsen' number has been used with permission in A Sharp Eye on Butterflies of Ghana where the G. elma butterflies in West Africa are now described as G. westafra.
