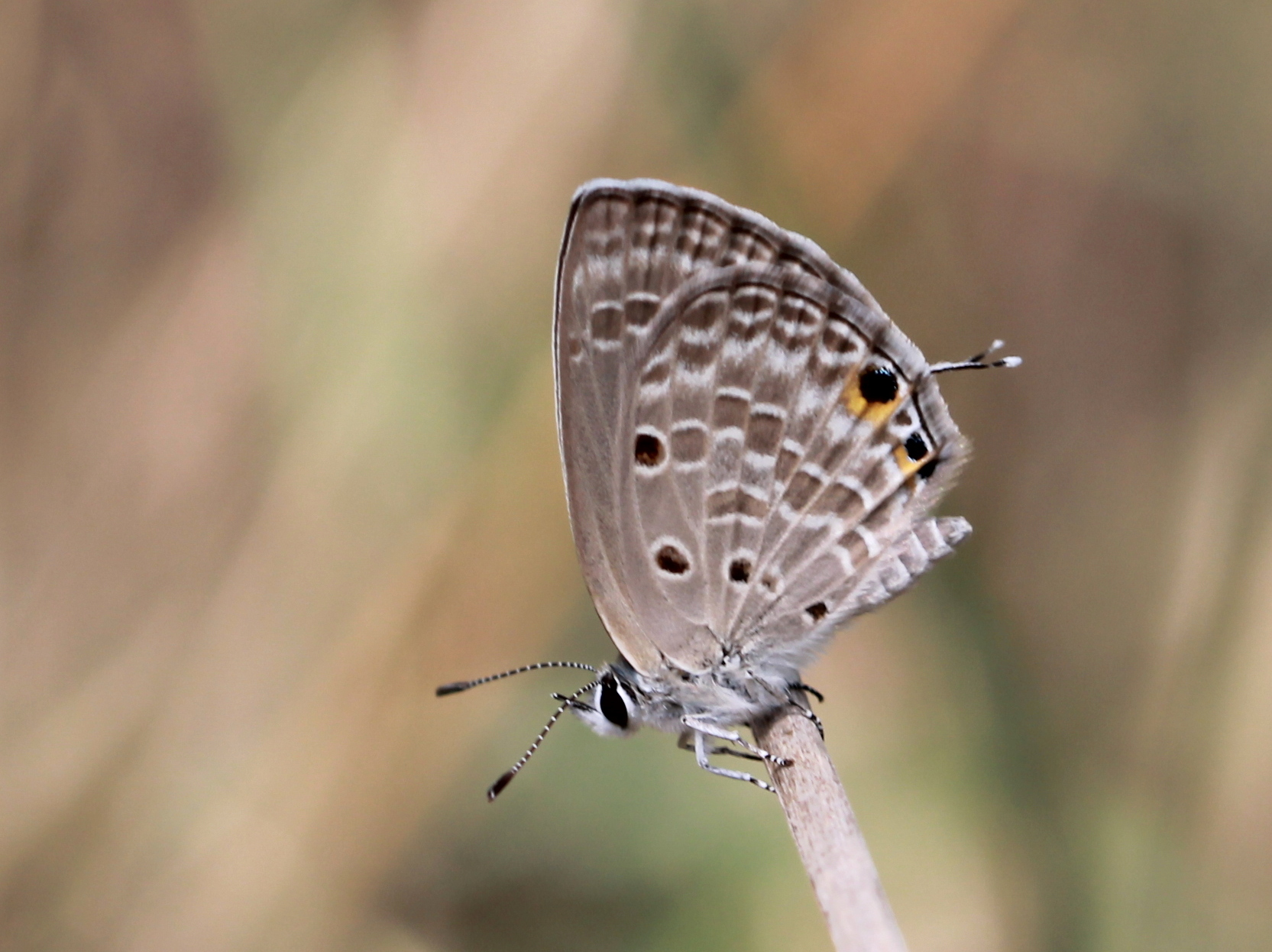
- Luthrodes pandava

Scientific classification
- Domain: Eukaryota
- Kingdom: Animalia
- Phylum: Arthropoda
- Class: Insecta
- Order: Lepidoptera
- Family: Lycaenidae
- Subfamily: Polyommatinae
- Tribe: Polyommatini
- Genus: Luthrodes; H. H. Druce, 1895

Synonyms
- Edales Swinhoe, 1910; Lachides Nekrutenko, 1984

= Luthrodes =

Butterfly genus in family Lycaenidae

Luthrodes is a genus of butterflies in the family Lycaenidae erected by Hamilton Herbert Druce in 1895. Its species are found in Asia and in Oceania.

== Species ==
Listed alphabetically:

- Luthrodes boopis (Fruhstorfer, 1897) Indonesia (Misool, Waigeo, Sulawesi, Banggai)
- Luthrodes buruana (Holland, 1900) Indonesia (Buru, Serang, Waigeu, Obi Islands)
- Luthrodes cleotas (Guérin-Méneville, [1831]) New Guinea, Bismarck Archipelago, Solomon Islands, Aru, Timor, Wetar
- Luthrodes contracta (Butler, 1880) – small Cupid
- Luthrodes ella (Butler, 1881) South Central Asia
- Luthrodes galba (Lederer, 1855) – Persian grass blue
- Luthrodes mindora (C. Felder & R. Felder, [1865]) Philippines
- Luthrodes pandava (Horsfield, [1829]) – plains Cupid
- Luthrodes peripatria (Hsu, 1980) Taiwan
