= Luthrodes boopis =

- Luthrodes boopis (top left)

Scientific classification
- Kingdom: Animalia
- Phylum: Arthropoda
- Clade: Pancrustacea
- Class: Insecta
- Order: Lepidoptera
- Family: Lycaenidae
- Genus: Luthrodes
- Species: L. boopis

Binomial name
- Luthrodes boopis (Fruhstorfer, 1897)

Synonyms
- Lycaena (Cupido) boopis Fruhstorfer, 1897; Cupido boopis (Fruhstorfer, 1897); Chilades boopis (Fruhstorfer, 1897)

Species of insect

Luthrodes boopis is a species of butterflies in the family Lycaenidae. It was originally described as Lycaena boopis by Hans Fruhstorfer in 1897.

== Range ==
Luthrodes boopis is known from Indonesia, specifically from Sulawesi and the Raja Ampat Islands (Misool, Waigeo).

== Taxonomy ==
Luthodes boopis has the following subspecies:

- Luthrodes boopis minor Ribbe, 1926
- Luthodes boopis boopis (Fruhstorfer, 1897)
