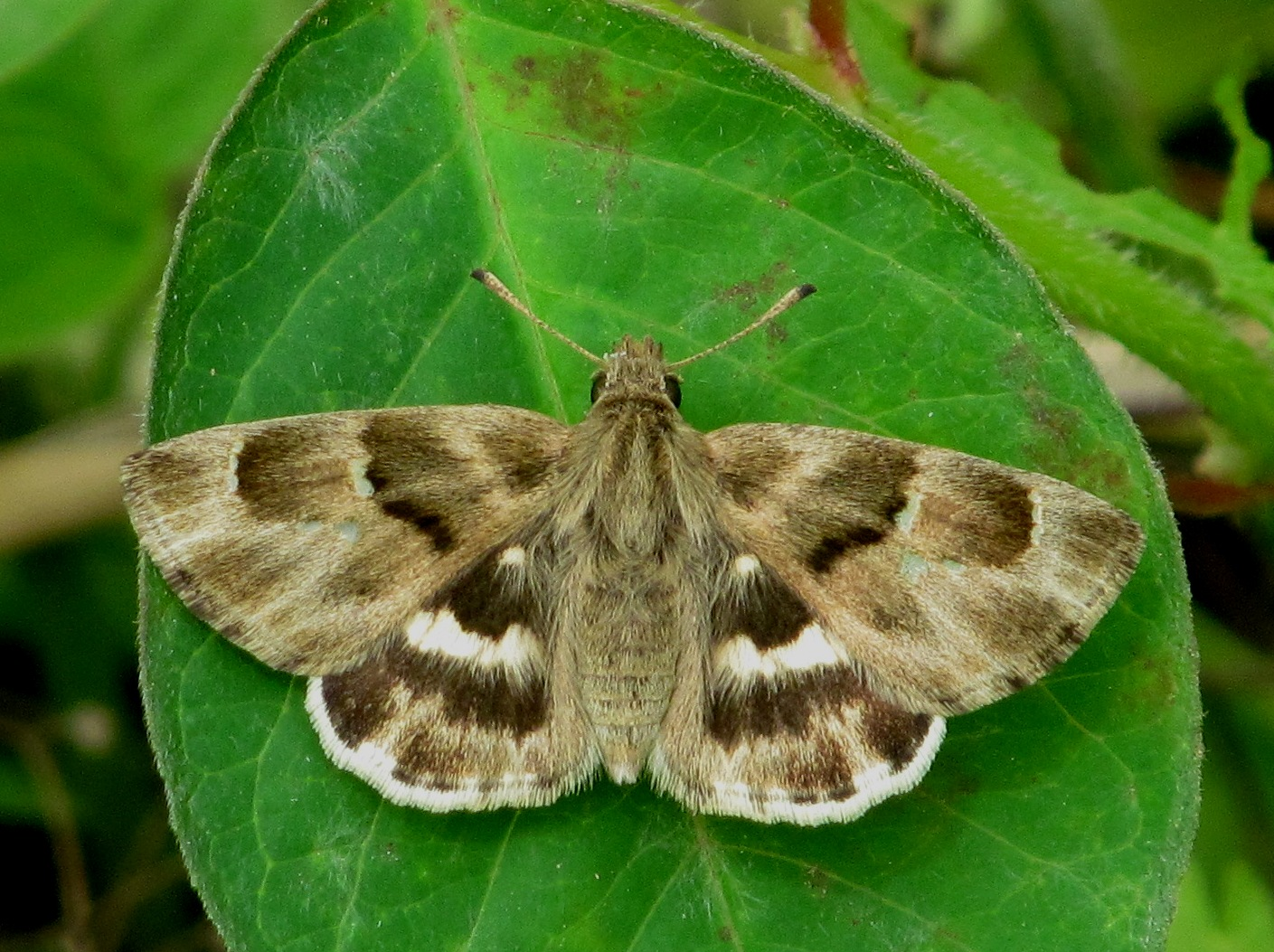
- Upperside of Gomalia elma

Scientific classification
- Kingdom: Animalia
- Phylum: Arthropoda
- Clade: Pancrustacea
- Class: Insecta
- Order: Lepidoptera
- Family: Hesperiidae
- Tribe: Carcharodini
- Genus: Gomalia
- Species: G. elma

Binomial name
- Gomalia elma (Trimen, 1862)

Synonyms
- Pyrgus elma Trimen, 1862; Gomalia albofasciata Moore, 1879; Tavetana jeanneli Picard, 1949

= Gomalia elma =

Marbled skipper

Species of butterfly

Gomalia elma, also known as the marbled skipper or African marbled skipper, is a species of hesperiid butterfly. It is found in Africa and parts of Asia.

== Description ==
Male. Upperside with the ground colour brownish-olive-grey. Forewing with a basal blackish-brown band, and an ante-medial darker band, the latter with its outer margin limited by a black thick line which extends from the sub-costal vein in an outward curve to the sub-median vein, its portion crossing the cell edged outwardly by a white lunular mark which closes the end of the cell, a white spot at the base of the second median interspace and another inwards below^ almost touching it, in the first median interspace, a large square blackish-brown patch on the costa limited outwardly by three sub-apical conjoined white spots, a similar but smaller patch at the apex, a larger similar patch on the middle of the outer margin, and a small narrow one at the hinder angle. Hindwing darker, a white middle band from the sub-costal vein to the abdominal fold, the inner portion of the wing from the band to the base black, containing a white sub-basal spot, a black band narrowing upwards attached to the lower portion of the white band, and a blackish macular, marginal baud. Cilia of both wings grey, marked in places with brown. Underside grey. Forewing with a darker ante-medial outwardly curved band darker than the ground colour, a white and grey mark at the end of the cell, a broader, grey, discal, more outwardly curved band and a grey band on the lower two-thirds of the margin. Antennae blackish, the underside of the shaft greyish-white; palpi and body beneath and the legs grey like the colour of the wings; palpi, head and body above brownish-olive, abdomen with whitish, thin segmental bands. Female similar to the male, usually larger.

— Charles Swinhoe, Lepidoptera Indica. Vol. X

The wingspan is 26–31 mm for males and 29–36 mm for females.

== Distribution ==
In Africa, Gomalia elma is found inSouth Africa (the Cape region, and Free State), Botswana, Zimbabwe, Mozambique, and other parts of Africa. In Asia, the butterfly ranges from Saudi Arabia, United Arab Emirates, Sri Lanka, Pakistan (Baluchistan) and India.

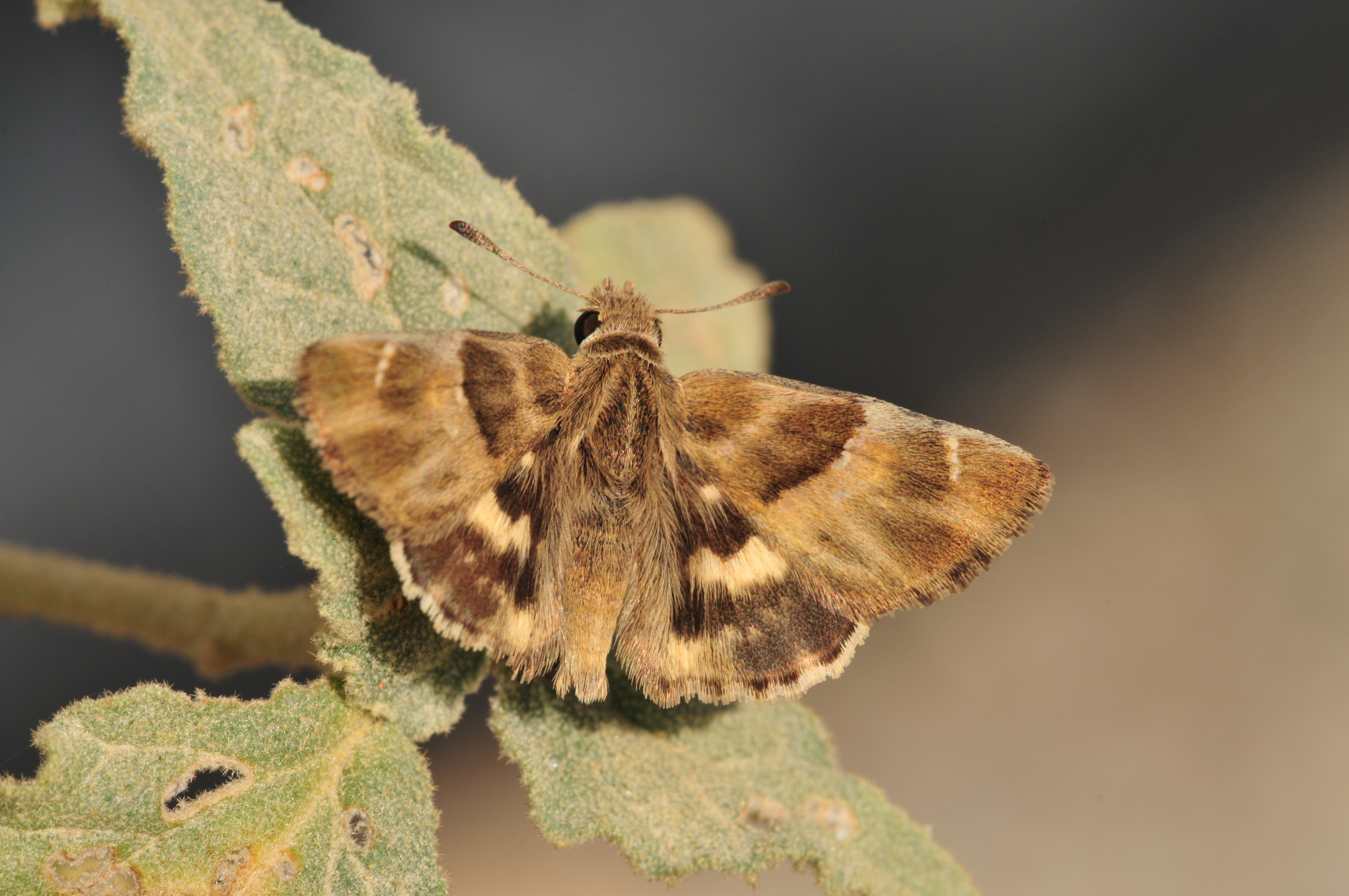
Gomalia elma from United Arab Emirates

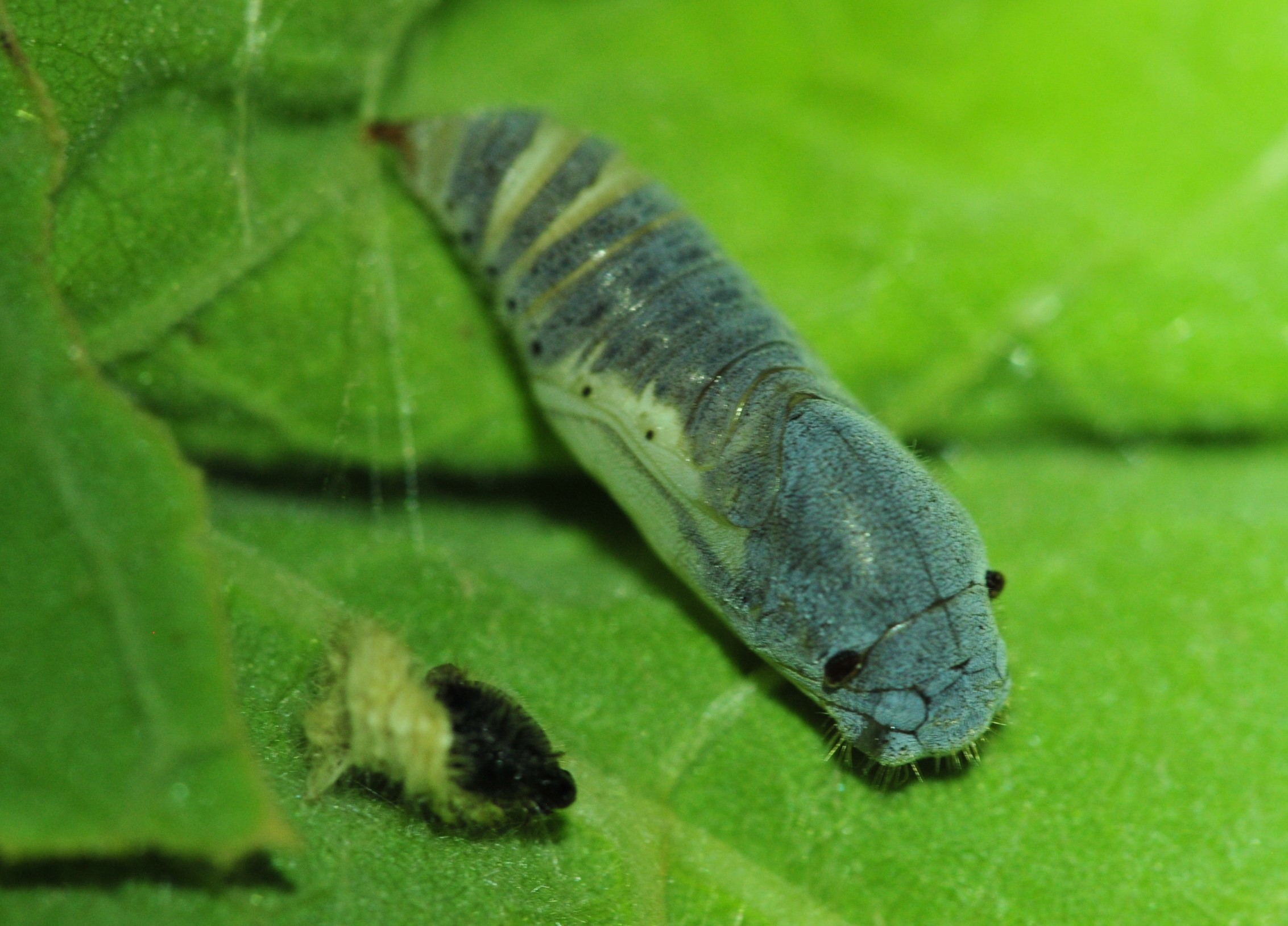
Pupa of Marbled skipper Gomalia elma

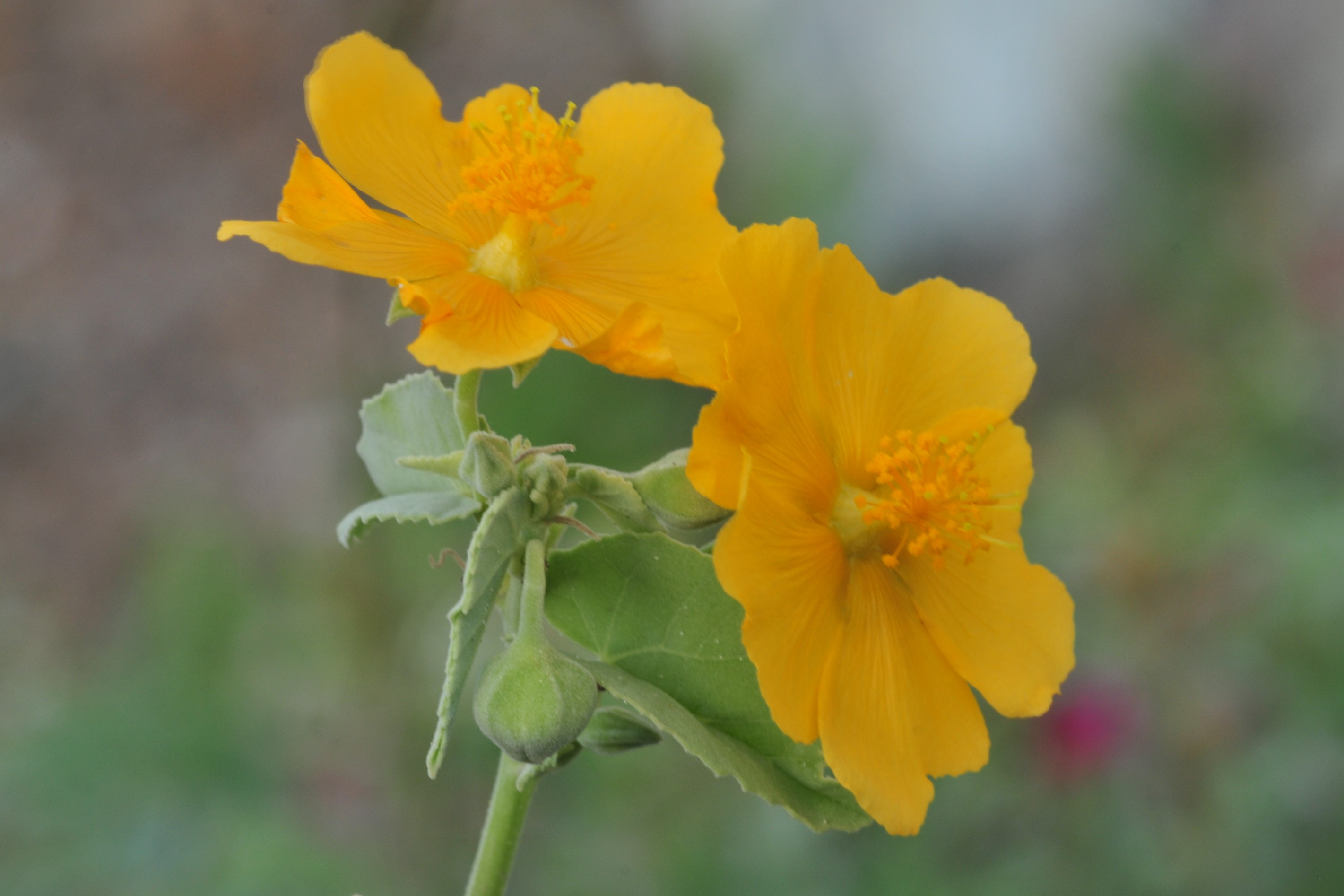

Torben Larsen developed a species numbering system for his 2005 publication Butterflies of West Africa. The species Gomalia Elma was #1270. This 'Larsen' number has been used with permission for the newly described Gomalia westafra illustrated in A Sharp Eye on Butterflies of Ghana.

== Food plants ==
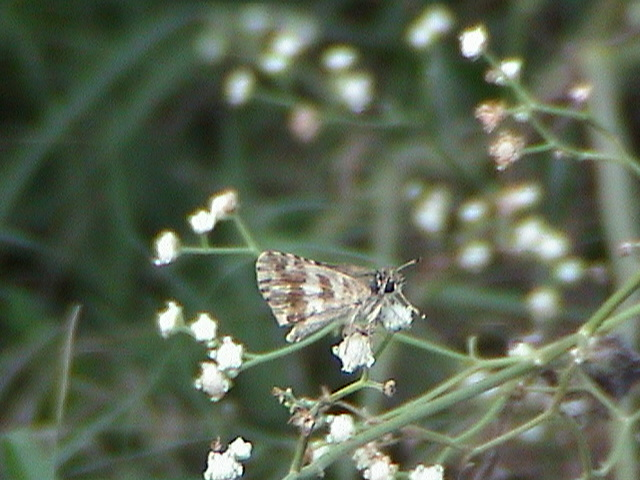
Underside of Gomalia elma

- Abutilon indicum
- Abutilon sonneratianum
- Abutilon pannosum
- Abutilon fruticosum

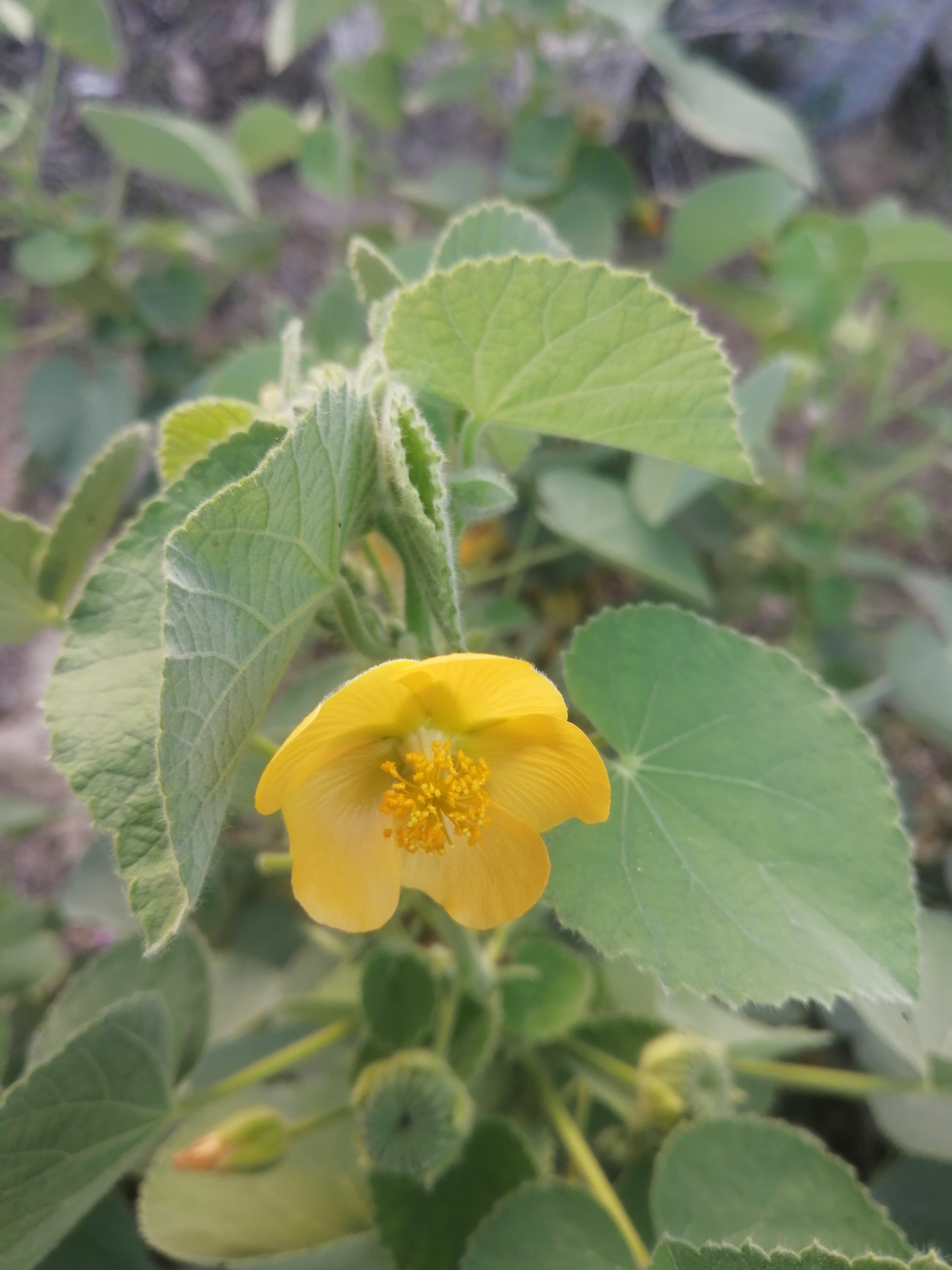
Abutilon pannosum, a peri agricultural bushy plant seen in Hajar mountains in United Arab Emirates and Oman

== Subspecies ==
- Gomalia elma elma (Africa, excluding West Africa where the species is Gomalia westafra)
- Gomalia elma albofasciata Moore, 1879 (India, Ceylon)
- Gomalia elma levana Benyamini, 1990 (Dead Sea valley in Israel and Jordan)

== See also ==
- Hesperiidae
- List of butterflies of India (Pyrginae)
- List of butterflies of India (Hesperiidae)
- List of butterflies of the United Arab Emirates
