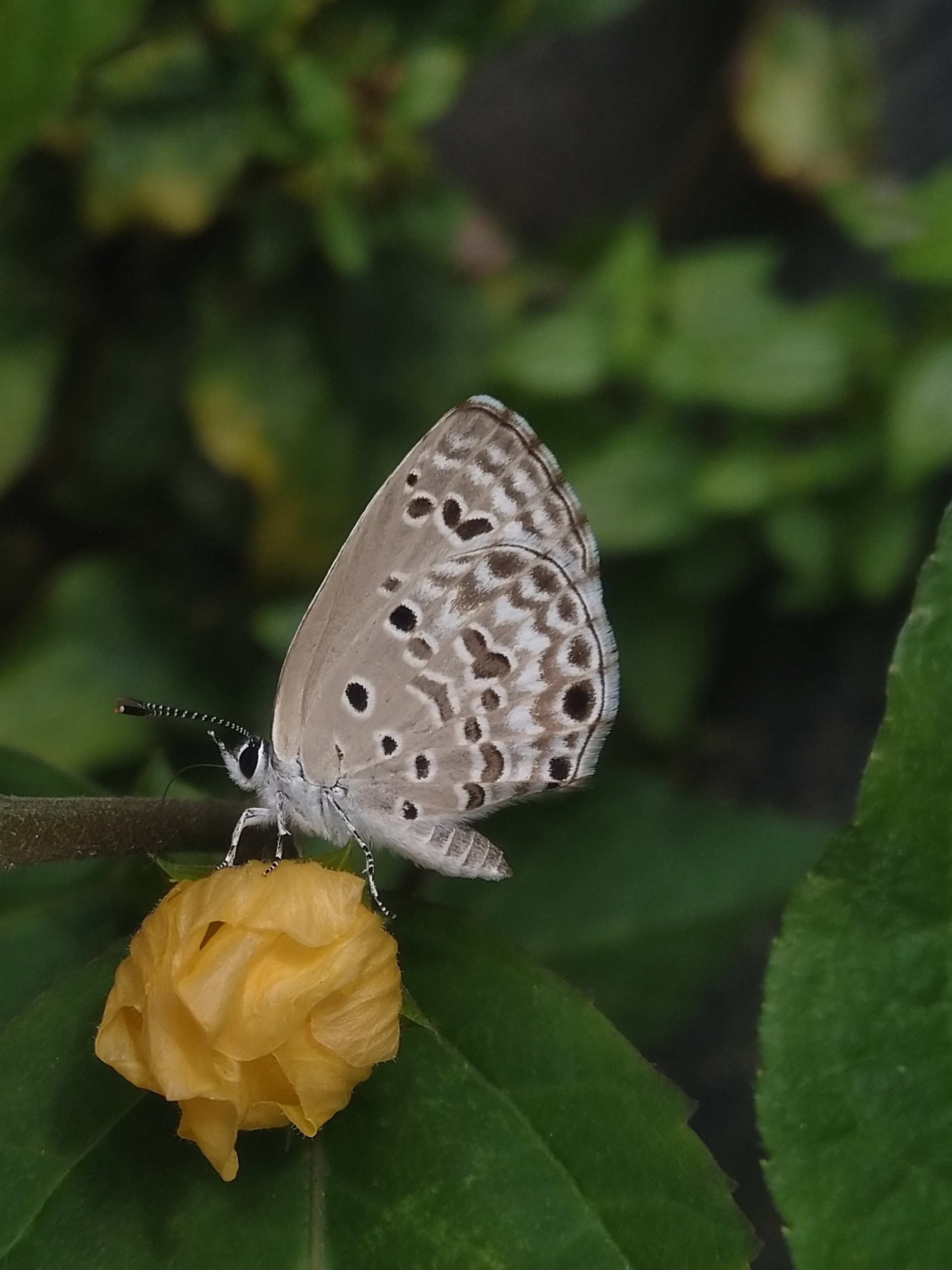

Scientific classification
- Kingdom: Animalia
- Phylum: Arthropoda
- Clade: Pancrustacea
- Class: Insecta
- Order: Lepidoptera
- Family: Lycaenidae
- Genus: Luthrodes
- Species: L. pandava

Binomial name
- Luthrodes pandava (Horsfield, 1829)

Synonyms
- Lycaena pandava Horsfield, [1829]; Edales pandava; Chilades pandava; Catochrysops nicola Swinhoe, 1885; Catochrysops bengalia de Nicéville, 1885; Catochrysops vapanda Semper, 1890

= Luthrodes pandava =

Plains Cupid

Species of butterfly

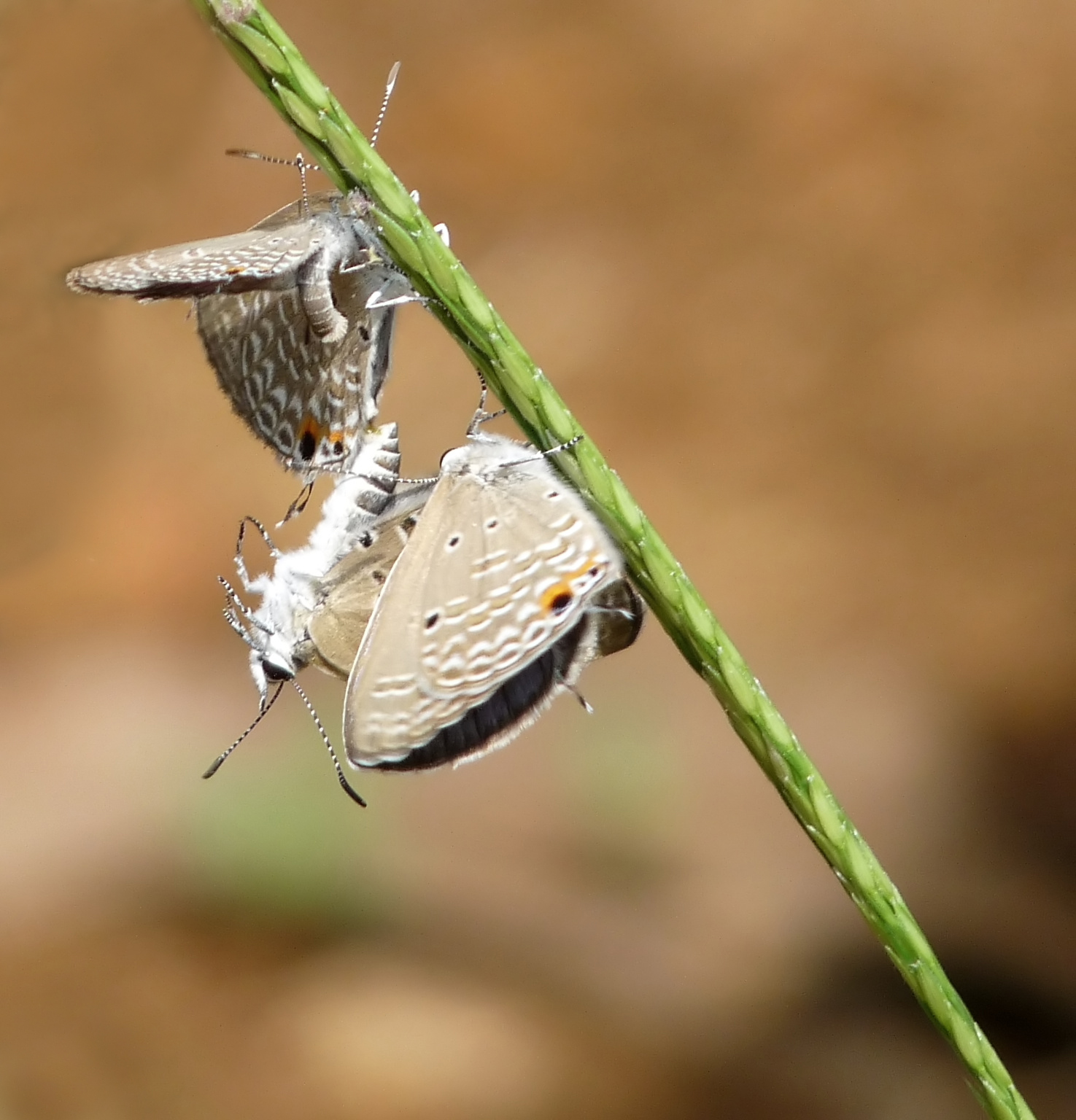
Fight to mate; this behaviour is common among the blues.

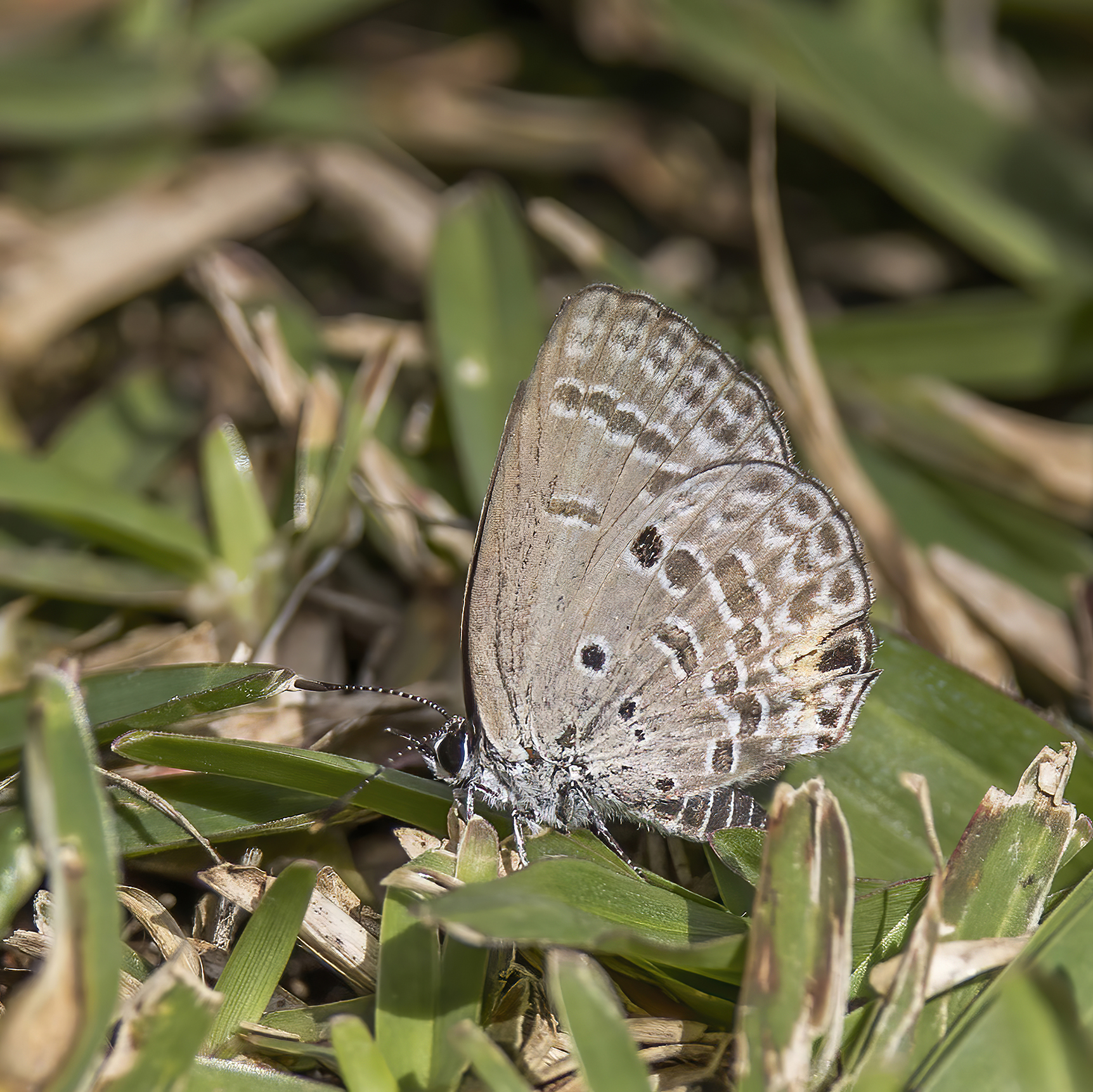
The species has been introduced to La Réunion

Luthrodes pandava also called the Plains Cupid or cycad blue, is a species of lycaenid butterfly found in South Asia, Myanmar, United Arab Emirates, Indochina, Peninsular Malaysia, Singapore, Taiwan, Java, Sumatra and the Philippines. They are among the few butterflies that breed on cycads, known for their leaves being toxic to most vertebrates.

== Description ==
=== Wet-season brood ===
The male upperside is lavender blue. Forewing has the costa narrowly and terminal margin more broadly fuscous brown, the latter with in addition an anteciliary black line; cilia light brown transversely traversed close to but not at their bases by a dark brown line. Hindwing: costa narrowly fuscous brown; a subterminal series of black spots outwardly edged by a white line; the spot in interspace 2 the largest and inwardly crowned more or less broadly with ochraceous yellow; an anteciliary black line and the cilia as on the forewing. Underside: greyish brown. Forewings and hindwings: the following transverse darker brown markings on each wing, the markings edged on the inner and outer sides with white lines—a short bar across the discocellulars, a discal catenulated (linked like a chain) band, the posterior two elongate spots of which on the forewing are en echelon, while the band on the hindwing in bisinuate and is capped anteriorly near the costa by a round black spot encircled with white; the above are followed by maculated (spotted) inner and outer subterminal bands, which on the hindwing are curved and more or less interrupted on the tornal area by a comparatively large round black spot in interspace 2 and a smaller similar spot in interspace 1, both spots inwardly crowned with ochraceous; the white edgings on the inner side to both subterminal bands on the hindwing are more or less lunular. In addition on the same wing there is a subbasal curved row of four white-encircled spots, of which the anterior two and the spot on the dorsum are black, the other dark brown. Antennae black, shafts ringed with white; head, thorax and abdomen brown, the head and thorax clothed with bluish hairs; beneath: palpi, thorax and abdomen whitish.

Female upperside: brown. Forewing: shot with blue from base outwards for a little over half its length down its middle, this blue irroration not extended to the costal margin; a slender anteciliary black line. Hindwing: a touch of blue iridescence near base; terminal markings much as on the forewing but the subterminal spots larger and not extended beyond interspace 6; in addition postdiscally there is a lightening of the shade of the ground colour, between which paler area and the subterminal spots the ground colour assumes the form of a postdiscal, short, transverse lunular band. Underside of female as in the male, the markings slightly larger and more clearly defined. Antennae, head, thorax and abdomen as in the male but slightly paler.

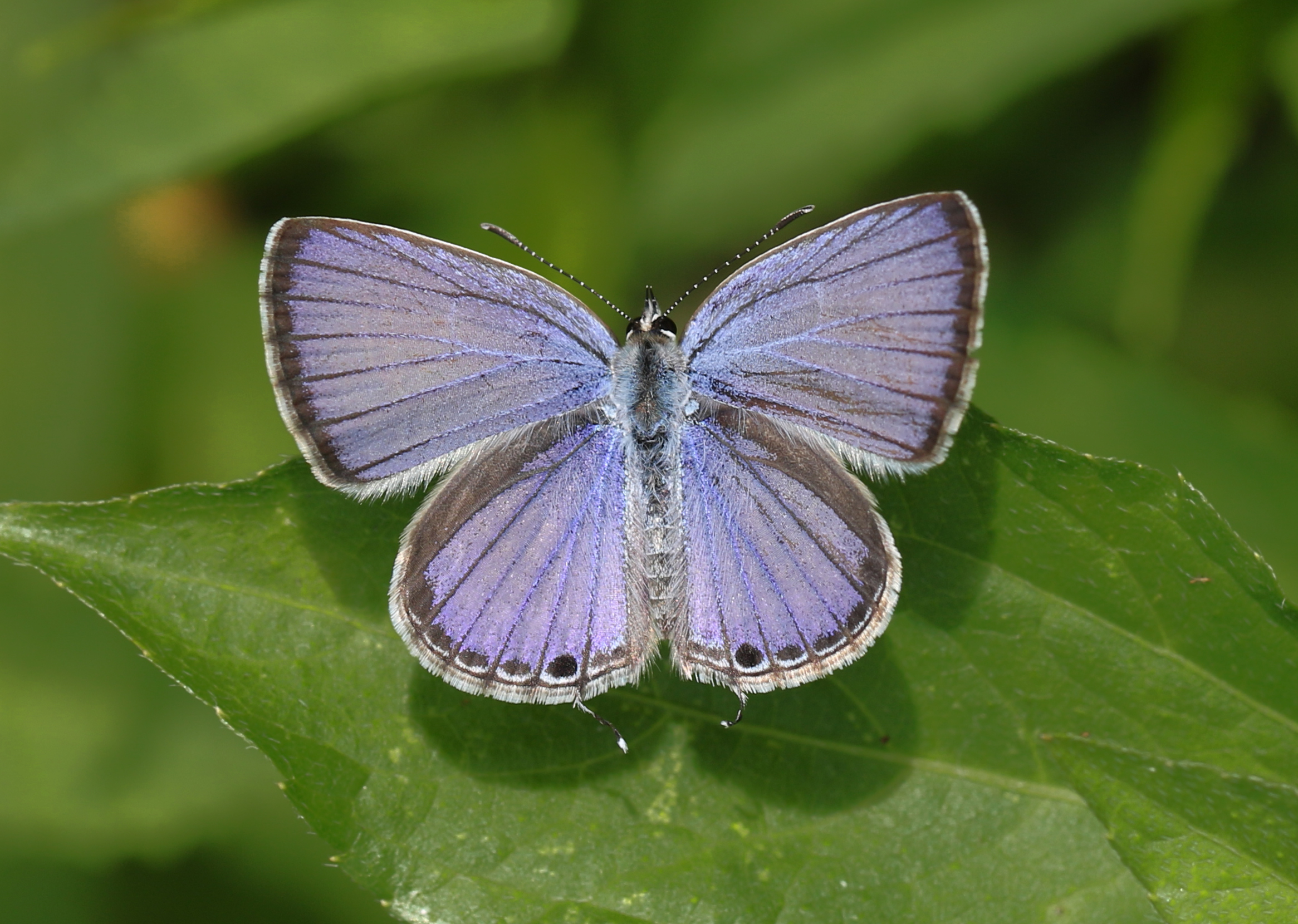
Upper side (male)

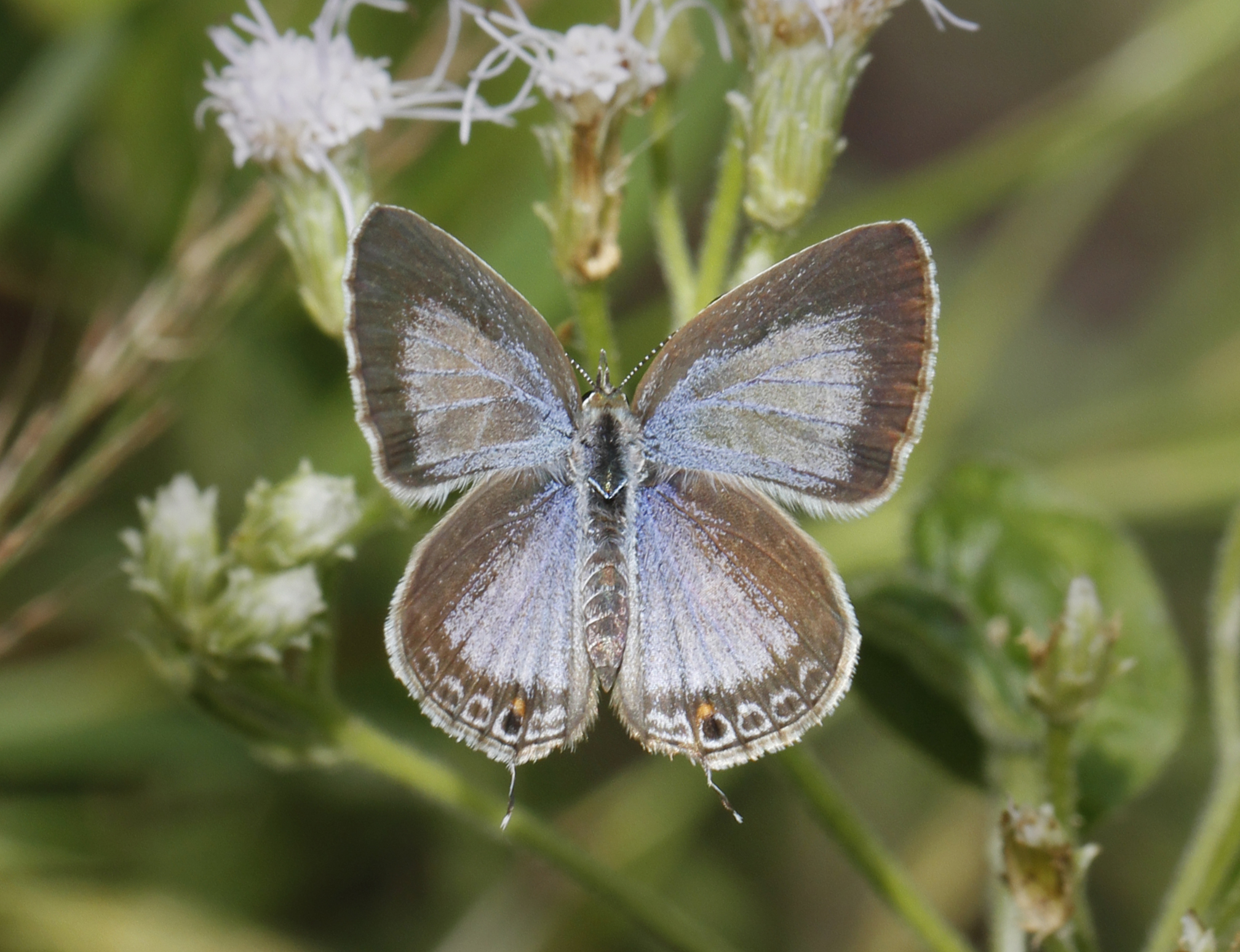
Upper side (female)

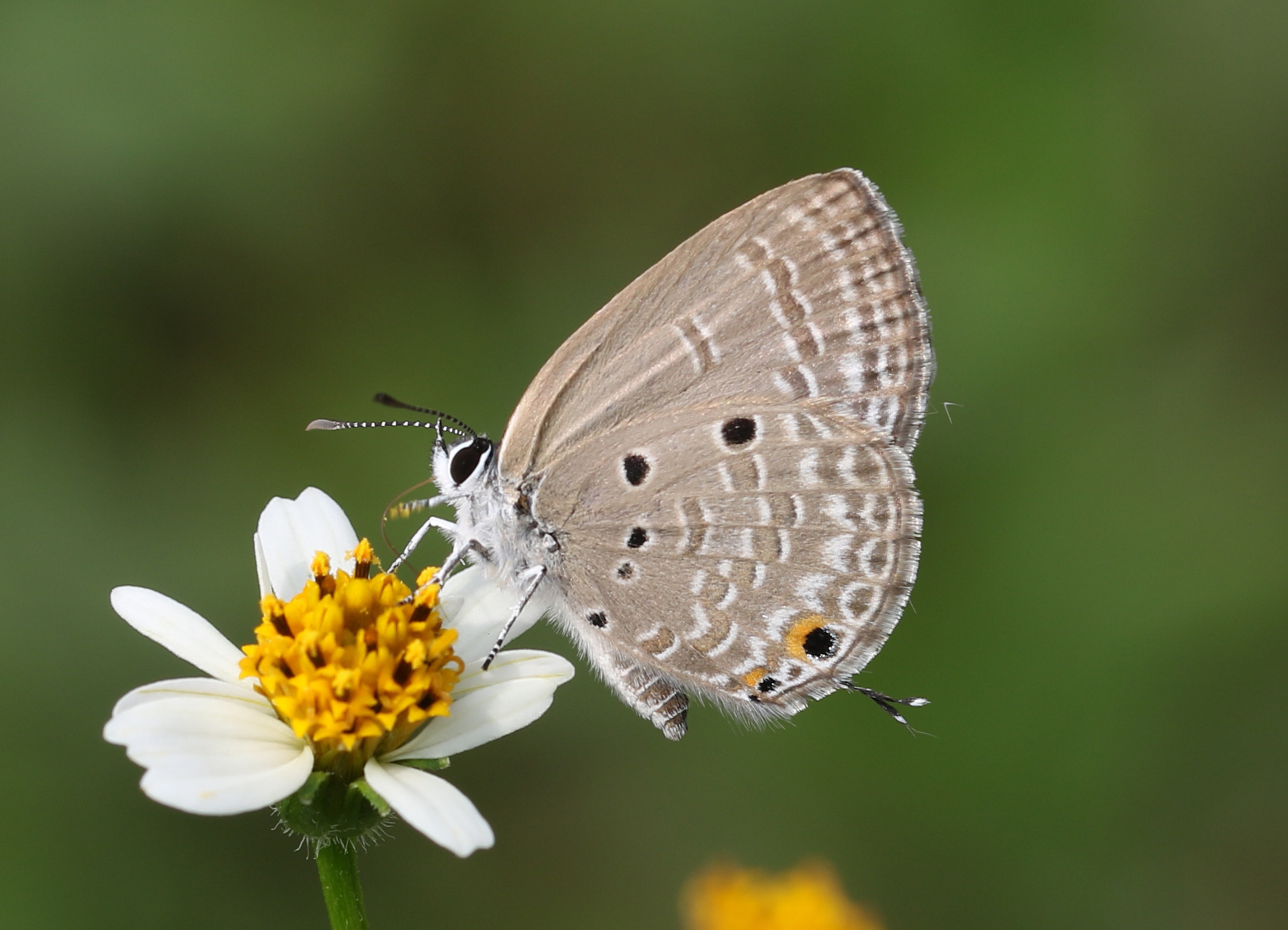
Underside (male)

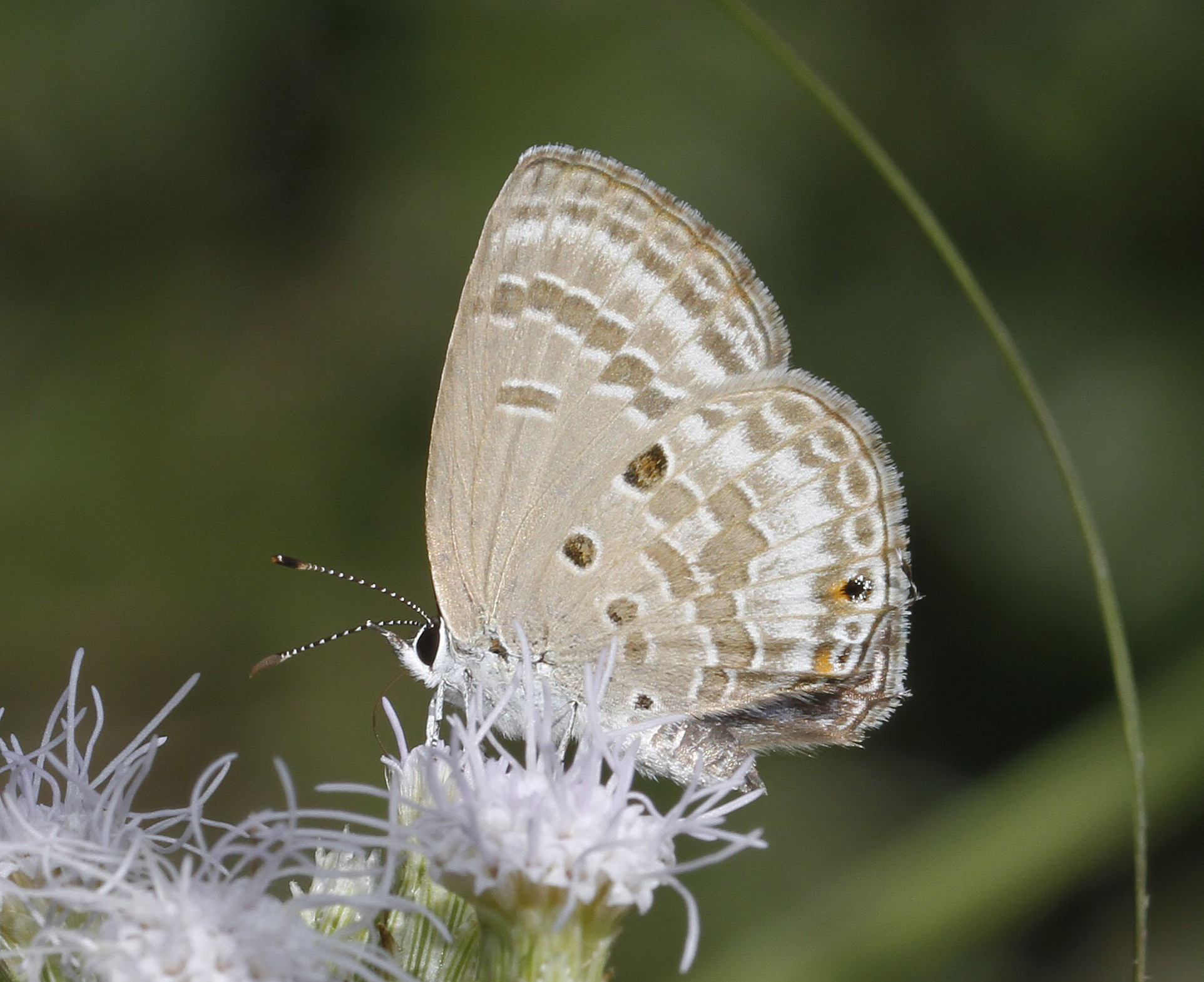
Underside (female)

Underside (most probably female)

=== Dry-season brood ===
Very similar to the same sexes of the wet-season brood, but can be recognized by the following differences: Upperside: Male ground colour slightly duller; subterminal spots on the hindwing less clearly defined. Female: The blue shot area extended outwards on the forewing for three-fourths of its length from base, but as in wet-season specimens not reaching the costal margin; on the hindwing the blue suffusion covers the entire medial portion of the wing from the base to the subterminal row of spots, of which latter the spot in interspace 2 is entirely without the inner ochraceous edging.

Underside: ground colour darker than in specimens of the wet-season brood, the discocellular and discal transverse bands on both forewings and hindwings broader, the terminal markings very ill-defined, the inner white edging to the inner of the two subterminal transverse bands broadened and very diffuse. On the hindwing the discocellular and discal bands coalesce and form an ill-defined diffuse medial cloud on the wing.

== Distribution ==
The species resides in peninsular India south of the outer ranges of the Himalayas, but not in the desert tracts and somewhat local; Ceylon: Assam: Burma; extending into the Malayan subregion.

== Subspecies ==
- Luthrodes pandava pandava
- Luthrodes pandava vapanda (Semper, 1899) (Philippines)
- Luthrodes pandava lanka (Evans, 1925) (Sri Lanka)
- Luthrodes pandava peripatria (Hsu, 1989) (Taiwan, Eastern China, Okinawa)

== Life cycle ==
=== Larva ===
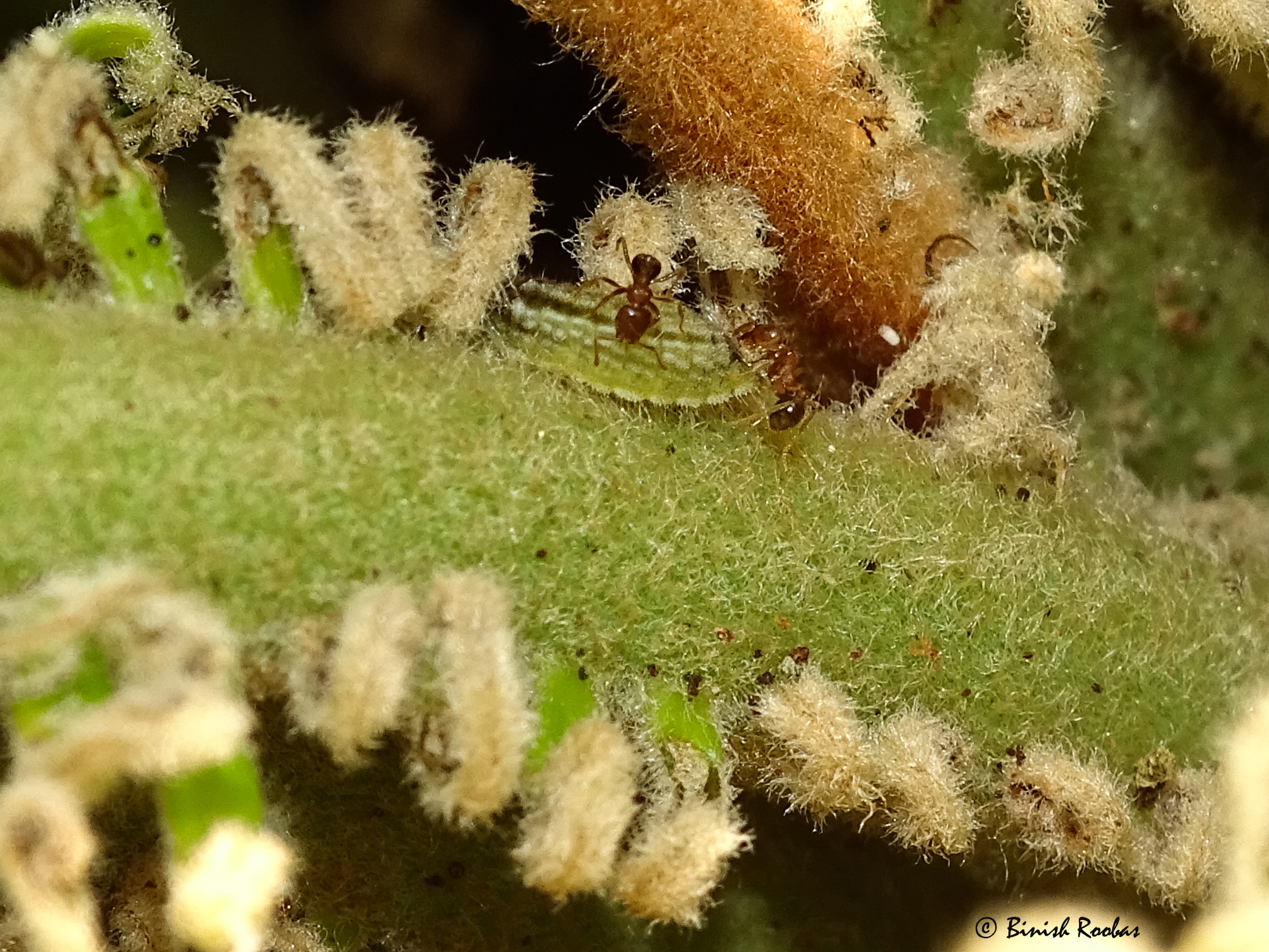
Cycad Cupid caterpillar tended by ants

"When full-grown a little over half an inch in length, of two distinct colours, some being bright green, others of a dark reddish purple (vinous) .... head very small, black, shining and hidden beneath the second segment, the third segment larger than the second, the other segments about equal in size, the anal segment flattened and rounded, divisions between the segments well-marked. The larva throughout is very rough, widely pitted or depressed and covered with very minute white tubercles bearing very short fine hairs, neither the hairs nor the tubercles being visible without a lens. The body at its highest and widest part is wider than high. It is extremely variable in its markings, hardly any two being exactly alike; there is usually a dark, dorsal, subdorsal and lateral line dividing the upper surface of the body into three equal areas, the dorsal and two subdorsal lines coalescing on the eleventh segment and forming a broad band to the thirteenth. In some specimens the divisions between the segments are marked with darker and there is a subdorsal series of oblique dark lines, one on each segment between the dorsal and subdorsal lines. The underside of the body and legs seems to be always green. The erectile organs on the twelfth segment very small, feeds in Calcutta on Cycas revoluta. In Calcutta three species of ants attend this larva, which Professor Forel has identified for me as Prenolepis longicornis, Latr., Monomorium speculare, Mayr and Crematogaster, n. sp." (Lionel de Nicéville quoted in Bingham)

=== Pupa ===
"Of the usual Lycaenid form, quite smooth, more or less fuscous, with a darker dorsal and subdorsal line, head-case somewhat square, thorax slightly humped and constricted posteriorly, spiracles pale. Though the larva swarm in April and May in Calcutta on the cultivated cycads in gardens, eating the hardly opened shoots or fronds, thereby utterly destroying the appearance of the plant for the year, I have never succeeded in finding the pupa on the plants, and can only conclude that the ants drive the full-grown larvae down the stems of the plants into their nests, where the larvae undergo their transformations." (de Nicéville.)

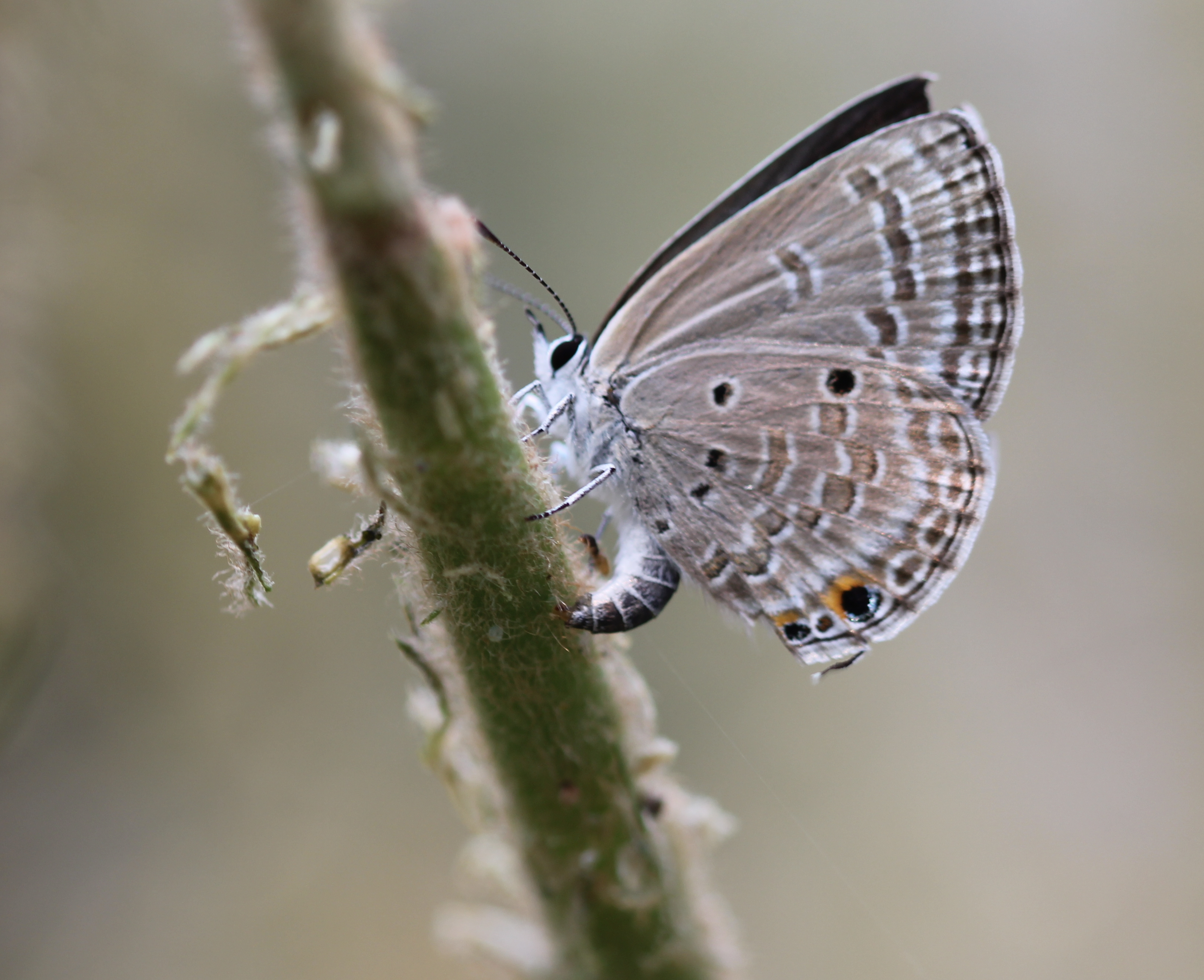
Female laying eggs

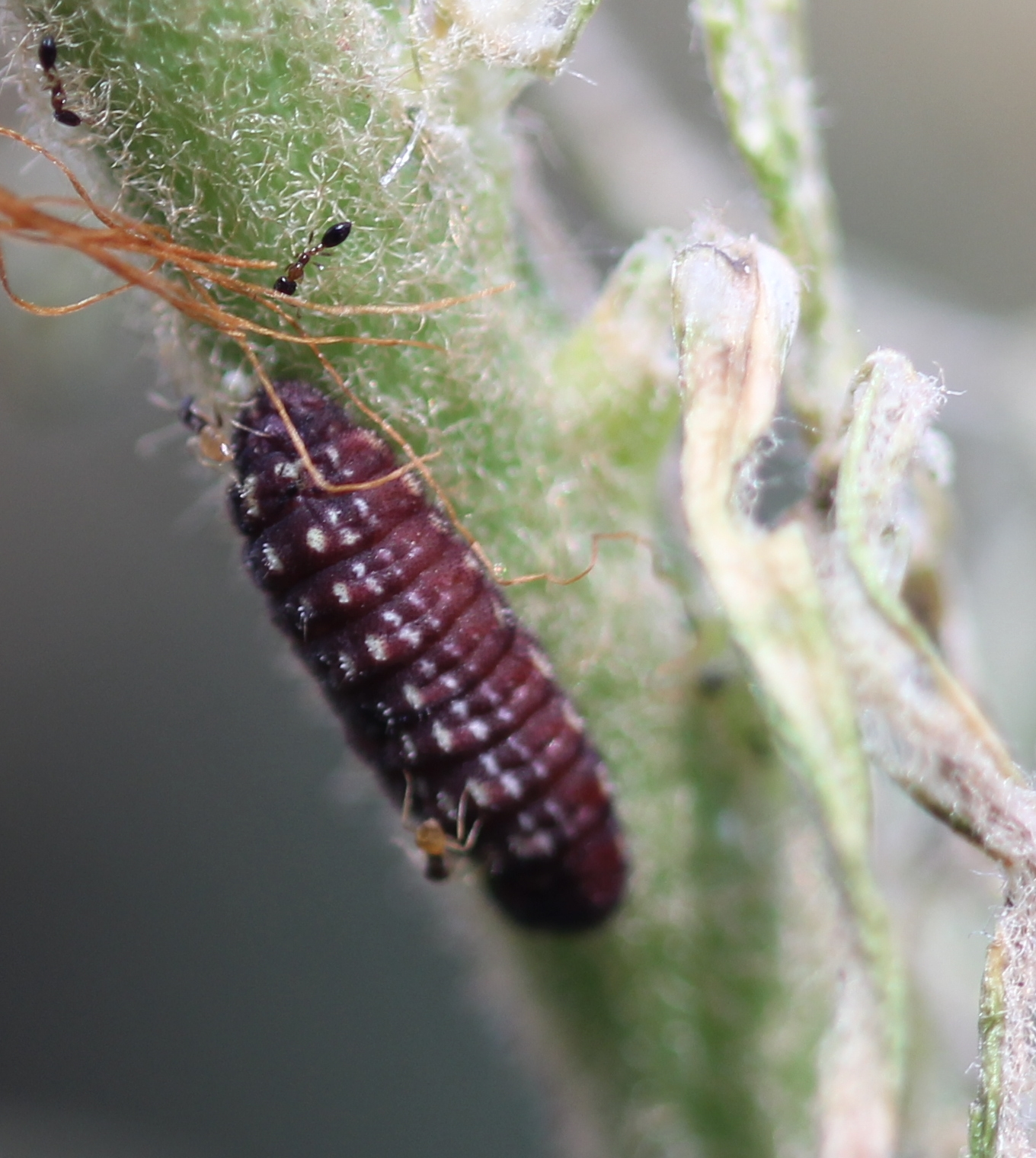
Early instar caterpillar tended by ants
