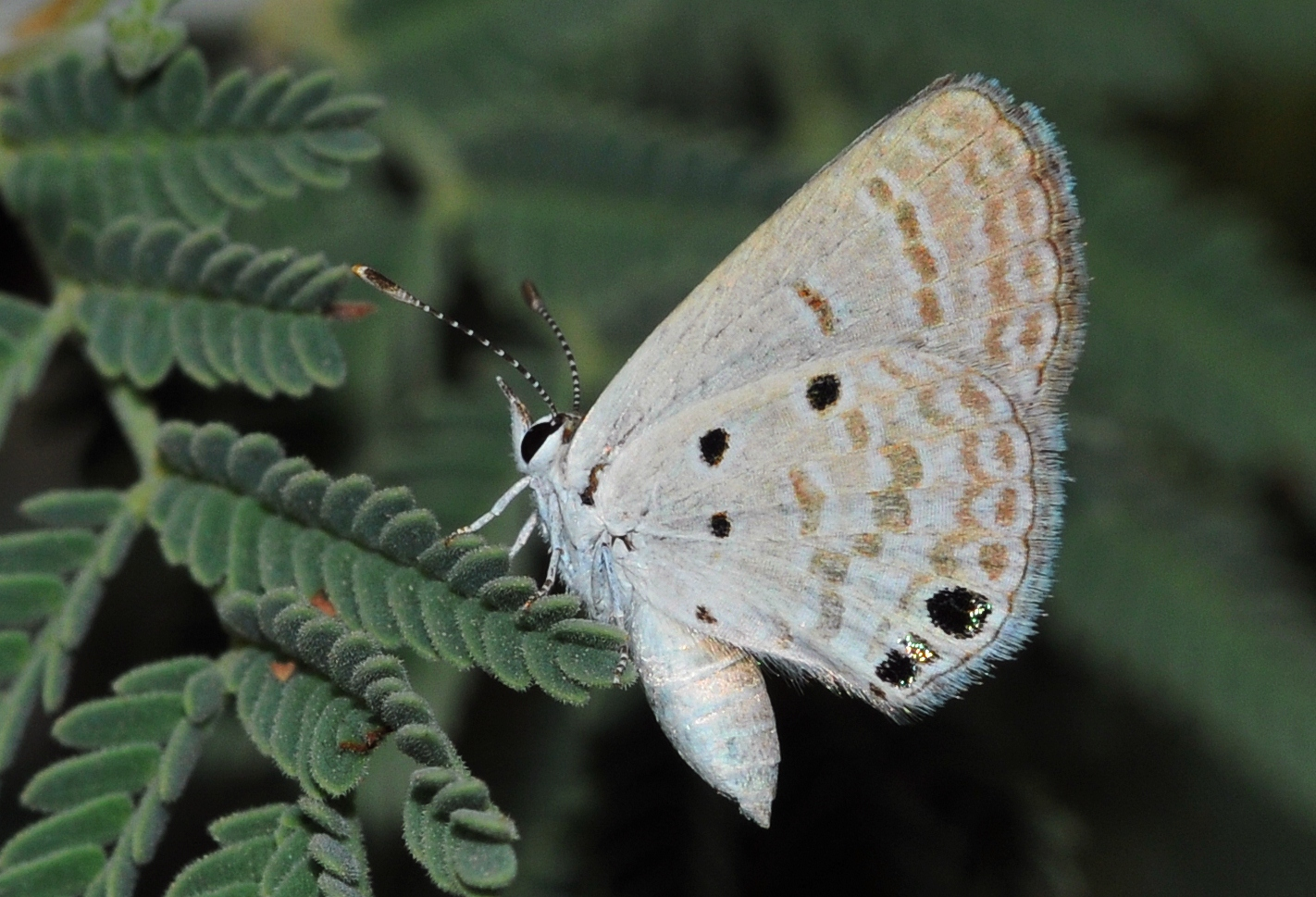

Scientific classification
- Domain: Eukaryota
- Kingdom: Animalia
- Phylum: Arthropoda
- Class: Insecta
- Order: Lepidoptera
- Family: Lycaenidae
- Genus: Luthrodes
- Species: L. galba

Binomial name
- Luthrodes galba (Lederer, 1855)

Synonyms
- Lycaena galba Lederer, 1855; Lachides galba (Lederer, 1855); Freyeria galba (Lederer, 1855); Chilades galba (Lederer, 1855); Lycaena phiala Grum-Grshimailo, 1890

= Luthrodes galba =

Species of butterfly

Luthrodes galba, the Persian grass blue, is a butterfly in the family Lycaenidae. It is found in southern Turkey, central and eastern Arabia, Iraq, Iran, Afghanistan, the Caucasus and Cyprus.

The larvae feed on Prosopis stephaniana, Acacia leucophloa, Acacia campbeli and Lagonychium farctum. They are associated with the ant species Monomorium gracillium.

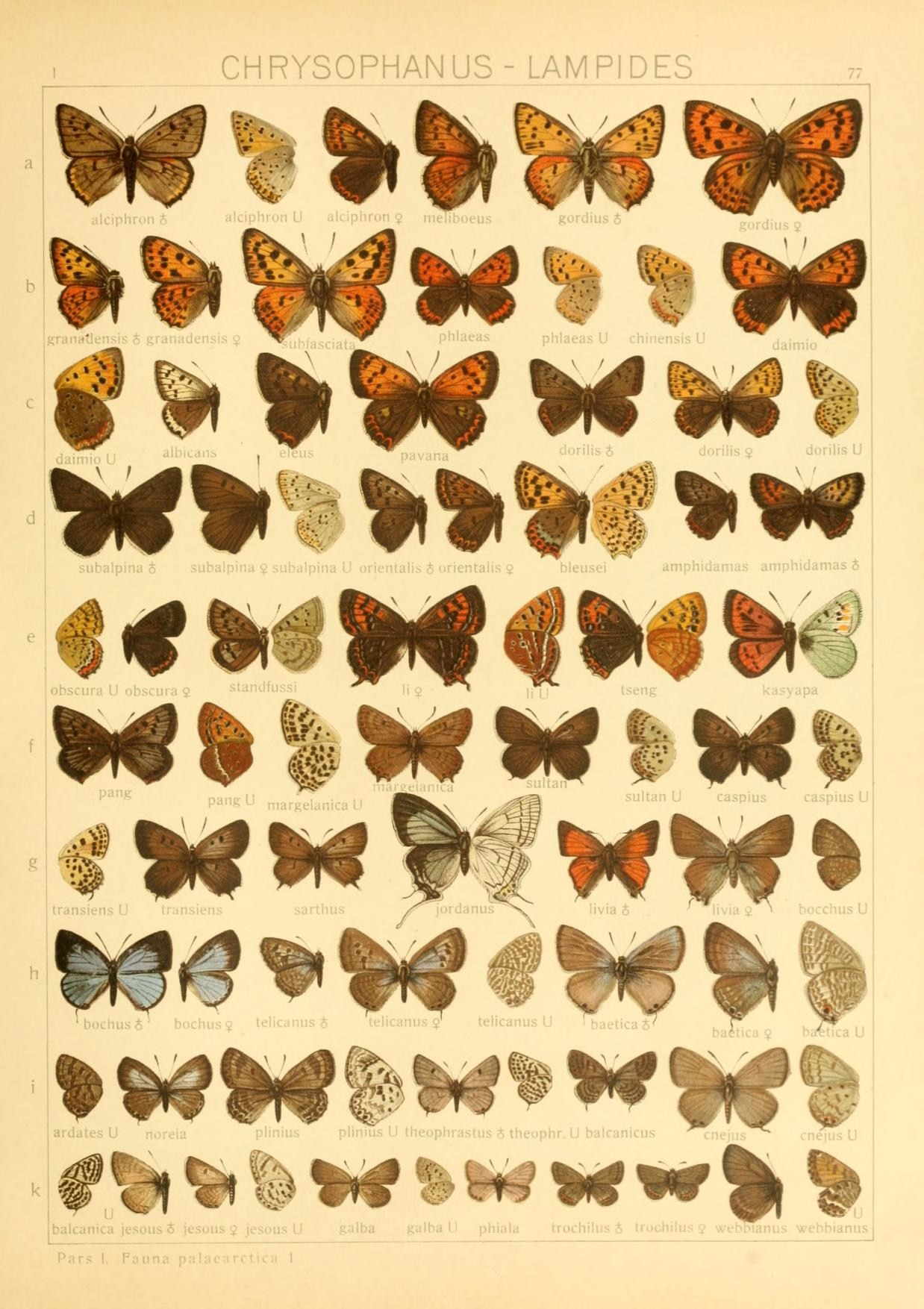
Seitz 77k

== Description from Seitz ==
Z. galba Led. (77 k). Above almost exactly like lysimon in both sexes, beneath strongly recalling species of Azanus, especially in the arrangement and development of the black spots; the forewing beneath bears also some similarity to Chilades trochylus, with which galba moreover agrees in size. It is very easily separated from trochilus by the absence of red and blue submarginal dots. — Syria, said to occur also in Egypt, being mentioned, e. g., from Ismailia on the canal of Suez.

== Subspecies ==
- Luthrodes galba galba (Caucasus Minor, highland of Armenia, Talysh Mountains)
- Luthrodes galba phiala (Grum-Grshimailo, 1890) (Kopet-Dagh, southern Ghissar)
