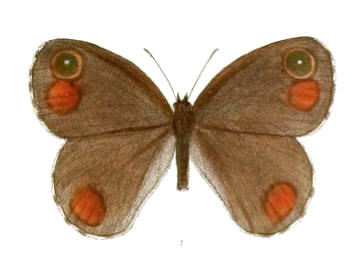
- Upperside
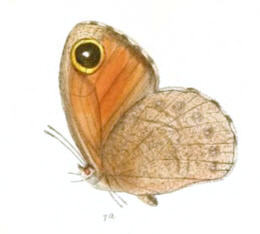
- Underside

Scientific classification
- Kingdom: Animalia
- Phylum: Arthropoda
- Clade: Pancrustacea
- Class: Insecta
- Order: Lepidoptera
- Family: Nymphalidae
- Genus: Paralasa
- Species: P. shallada

Binomial name
- Paralasa shallada (Lang, 1881)

Synonyms
- Erebia shallada; Callerebia shallada

= Paralasa shallada =

Species of butterfly

Paralasa shallada, the mountain argus, is a butterfly in the family Nymphalidae. It is found from Chitral to Garhwal. It was described by Arthur Moffatt Lang in 1881.

== Description ==
This species is very similar to Paralasa kalinda but has smaller red patches on the upperside. The sub-apical ocellus has an obscure yellow ring around it. This species is also larger than kalinda and the male is less brightly colored and is also broader-winged.

== Subspecies ==
This species has two subspecies-

- Paralasa shallada shallada (Lang, 1881) From Kashmir to Garhwal. The ocellus is small.
- Paralasa shallada tarbena (Evans, 1932) Chitral. The ocellus is enlarged.
