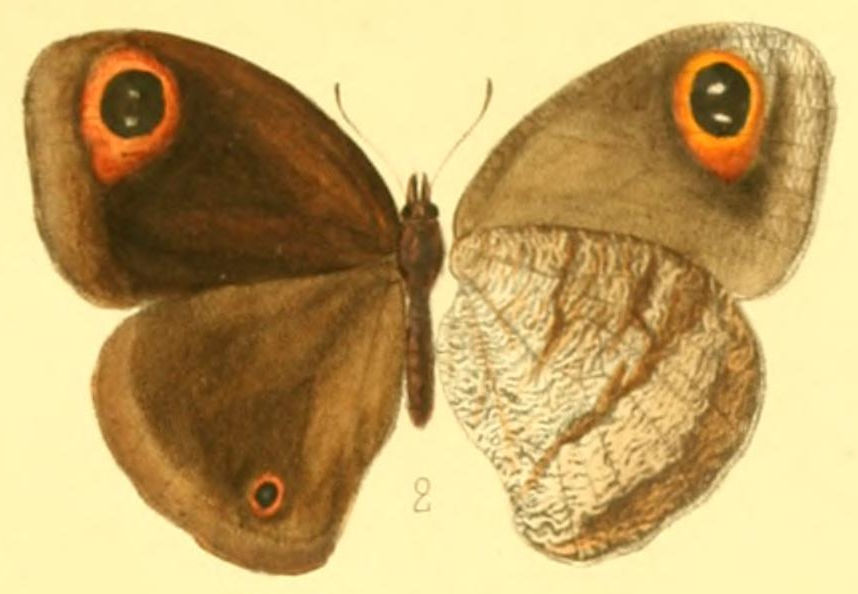
- Callerebia polyphemus in Charles Oberthür's Lépidoptères de Chine

Scientific classification
- Domain: Eukaryota
- Kingdom: Animalia
- Phylum: Arthropoda
- Class: Insecta
- Order: Lepidoptera
- Family: Nymphalidae
- Subtribe: Satyrina
- Genus: Callerebia; Butler, 1867

= Callerebia =

Genus of butterflies

Callerebia is a butterfly genus of the family Nymphalidae endemic to the Himalayas.

== Species ==
- Callerebia annada (Moore, 1858)
- Callerebia baileyi South, 1913
- Callerebia caeca Watkins, 1925
- Callerebia daksha Moore, 1874
- Callerebia dibangensis Roy, 2013
- Callerebia hybrida Butler, 1880
- Callerebia kalinda (Moore, 1865)
- Callerebia nirmala (Moore, 1865)
- Callerebia orixa Moore, 1872
- Callerebia polyphemus Oberthür, 1877
- Callerebia scanda (Kollar, 1844)
- Callerebia shallada (Lang, 1880)
- Callerebia suroia Tytler, 1914
- Callerebia tsirava Evans, 1915
- Callerebia ulfi Huang, 2003
- Callerebia watsoni Watkins, 1925
