= Paralasa chitralica =

Scientific classification
- Kingdom: Animalia
- Phylum: Arthropoda
- Clade: Pancrustacea
- Class: Insecta
- Order: Lepidoptera
- Family: Nymphalidae
- Genus: Paralasa
- Species: P. chitralica

Binomial name
- Paralasa chitralica Evans, 1923

Synonyms
- Erebia kalinda chitralica

Species of butterfly

Paralasa chitralica, the Chitral argus, is a butterfly in the family Nymphalidae. It is found in Chitral. It was described by William Harry Evans in 1923.

== Description ==
This species is close to and was once considered a subspecies of Paralasa kalinda. It is differentiated from kalinda by not having a tawny patch on the upperside forewing and having an unpupiled forewing ocellus.

== Subspecies ==
This species has two subspecies-

- Paralasa chitralica chitralica Chitral
- Paralasa chitralica pamira Pamir Mountains
