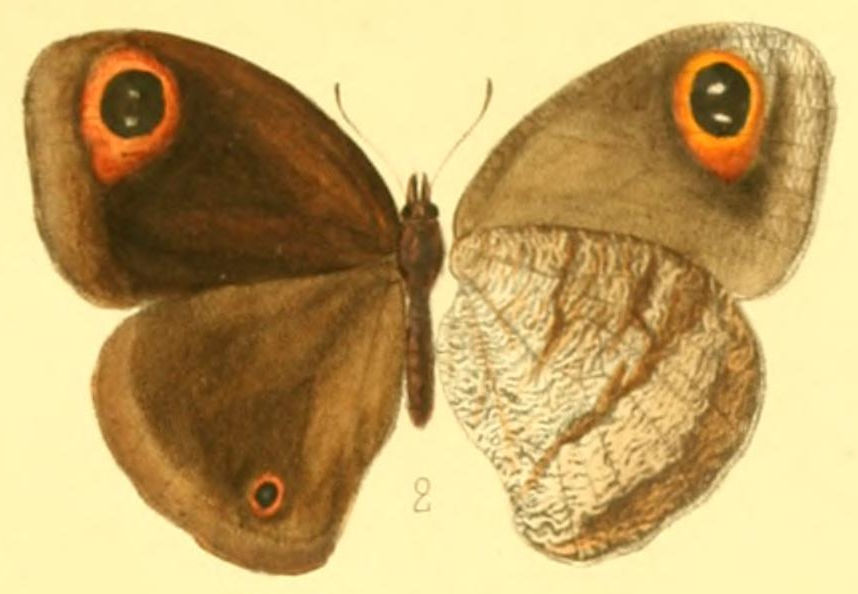
- Callerebia polyphemus polyphemus (left: upperside, right: underside)

Scientific classification
- Domain: Eukaryota
- Kingdom: Animalia
- Phylum: Arthropoda
- Class: Insecta
- Order: Lepidoptera
- Family: Nymphalidae
- Genus: Callerebia
- Species: C. polyphemus

Binomial name
- Callerebia polyphemus (Oberthür, [1876])

Synonyms
- Erebia polyphemus Oberthür, [1876]

= Callerebia polyphemus =

Species of butterfly

Callerebia polyphemus is a butterfly found in the east Palearctic (western China and Japan) that belongs to the browns family (Nymphalidae). The species was first described by Charles Oberthür in 1876.

== Description from Seitz ==
Callerebia polyphemus Oberthür (34 f) is by far the largest form of the whole genus, being easily recognized by the size alone; the upperside of the forewing bears frequently accessory ocelli. — hybrida Btlr. [Pradesh, India Callerebia hybrida Butler, 1880] (= annada Marsh and de Nicev. in tab.) (35 a), which is only half the size, has an oval apical ocellus on the forewing and 2 ocelli in the anal area of the underside of the hindwing; comes nearest to the name-typical annada. — ophthalmica Nicev. [ = Callerebia orixa Moore, 1872 sic] is exactly like orixa [Callerebia orixa Moore, 1872], except that but a form of annada; still smaller than the latter, but of exactly the same shape, the anal lobe of the hindwing not being very strongly developed. The border of the ocellus of the forewing is continued towards the hindmargin of the wing as an orange-brown band, within which there are 2 ocelli; the hindwing, too, bears 2 submarginal small ocelli on the upperside. From Western Se-chuen.
