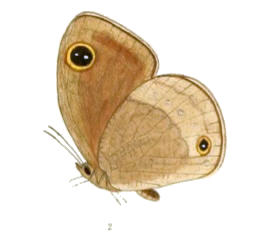

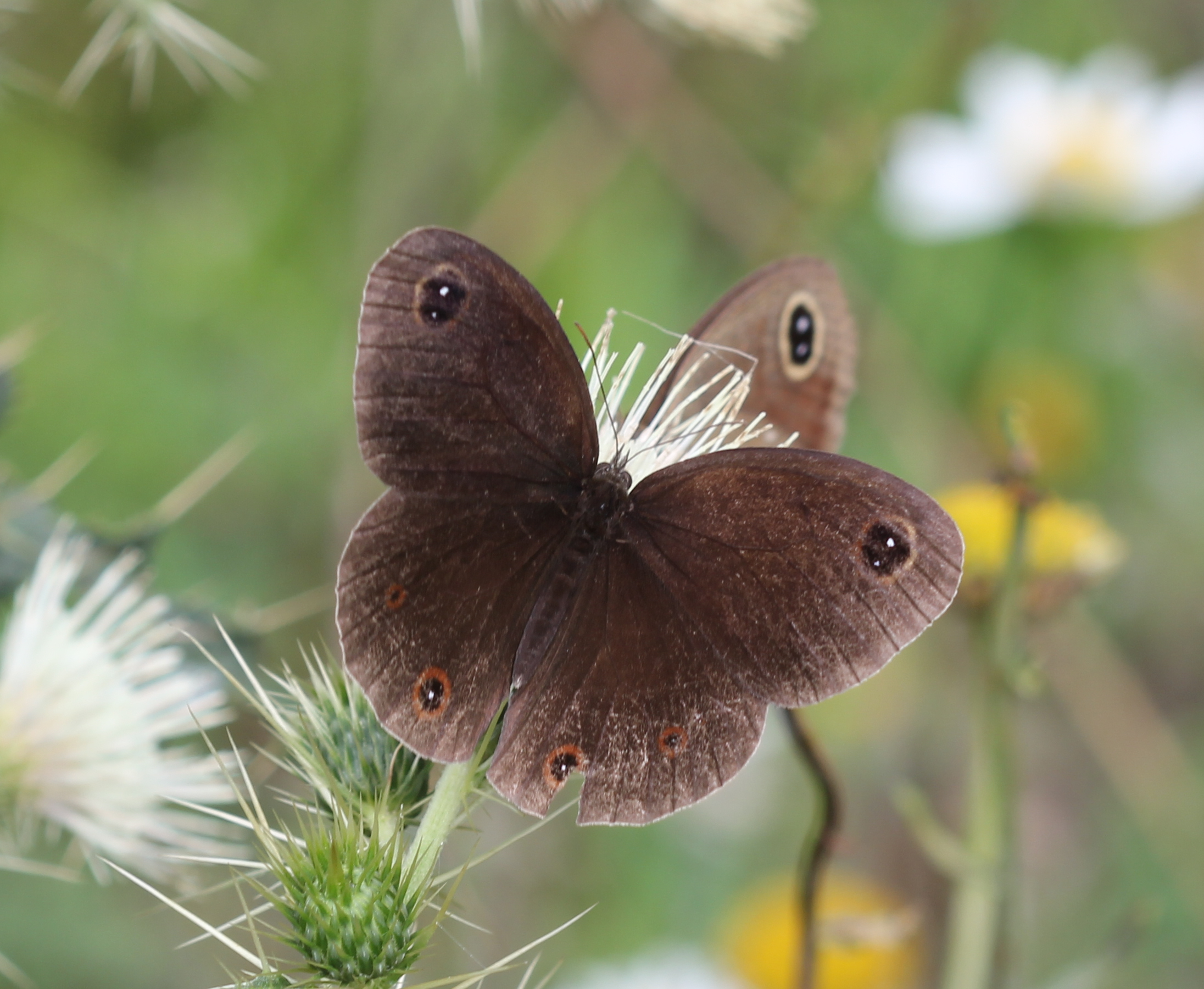

Scientific classification
- Kingdom: Animalia
- Phylum: Arthropoda
- Class: Insecta
- Order: Lepidoptera
- Family: Nymphalidae
- Genus: Callerebia
- Species: C. nirmala

Binomial name
- Callerebia nirmala Moore, 1865

= Callerebia nirmala =

Common Argus

Species of butterfly

Callerebia nirmala, the common argus is a species of Satyrinae butterfly found in the Himalayas.

== See also ==
- Satyrinae
- Nymphalidae
- List of butterflies of India (Satyrinae)
