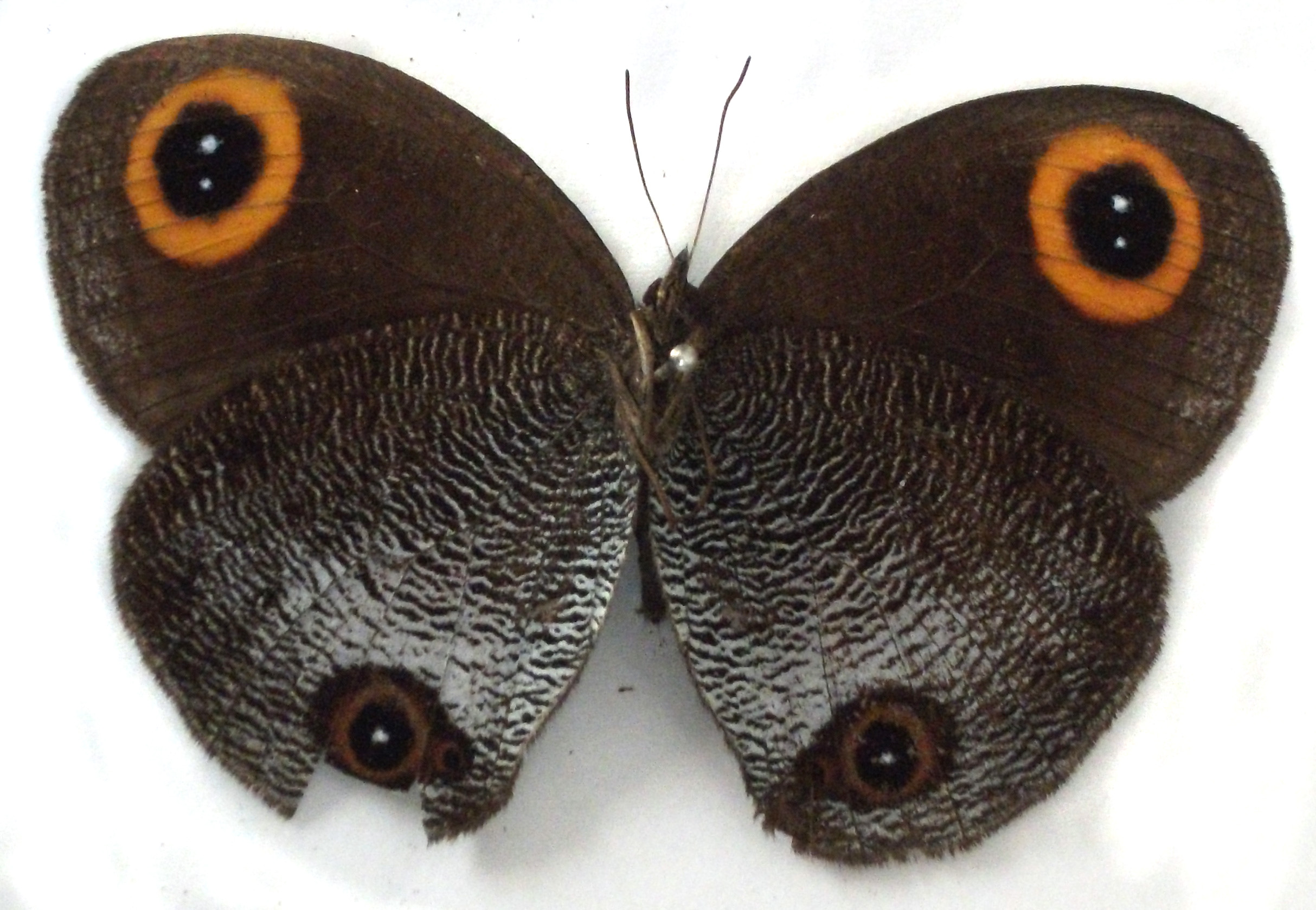

Scientific classification
- Domain: Eukaryota
- Kingdom: Animalia
- Phylum: Arthropoda
- Class: Insecta
- Order: Lepidoptera
- Family: Nymphalidae
- Genus: Callerebia
- Species: C. dibangensis

Binomial name
- Callerebia dibangensis Roy, 2013

= Callerebia dibangensis =

Roy’s Argus

Species of butterfly

Callerebia dibangensis, the Roy’s argus or bright-eyed argus is a species of Satyrinae butterfly found in eastern Himalaya, India.

== Range ==
The butterfly is endemic to Upper Dibang Valley and Mayodia pass of Arunachal Pradesh, India.

== Description ==
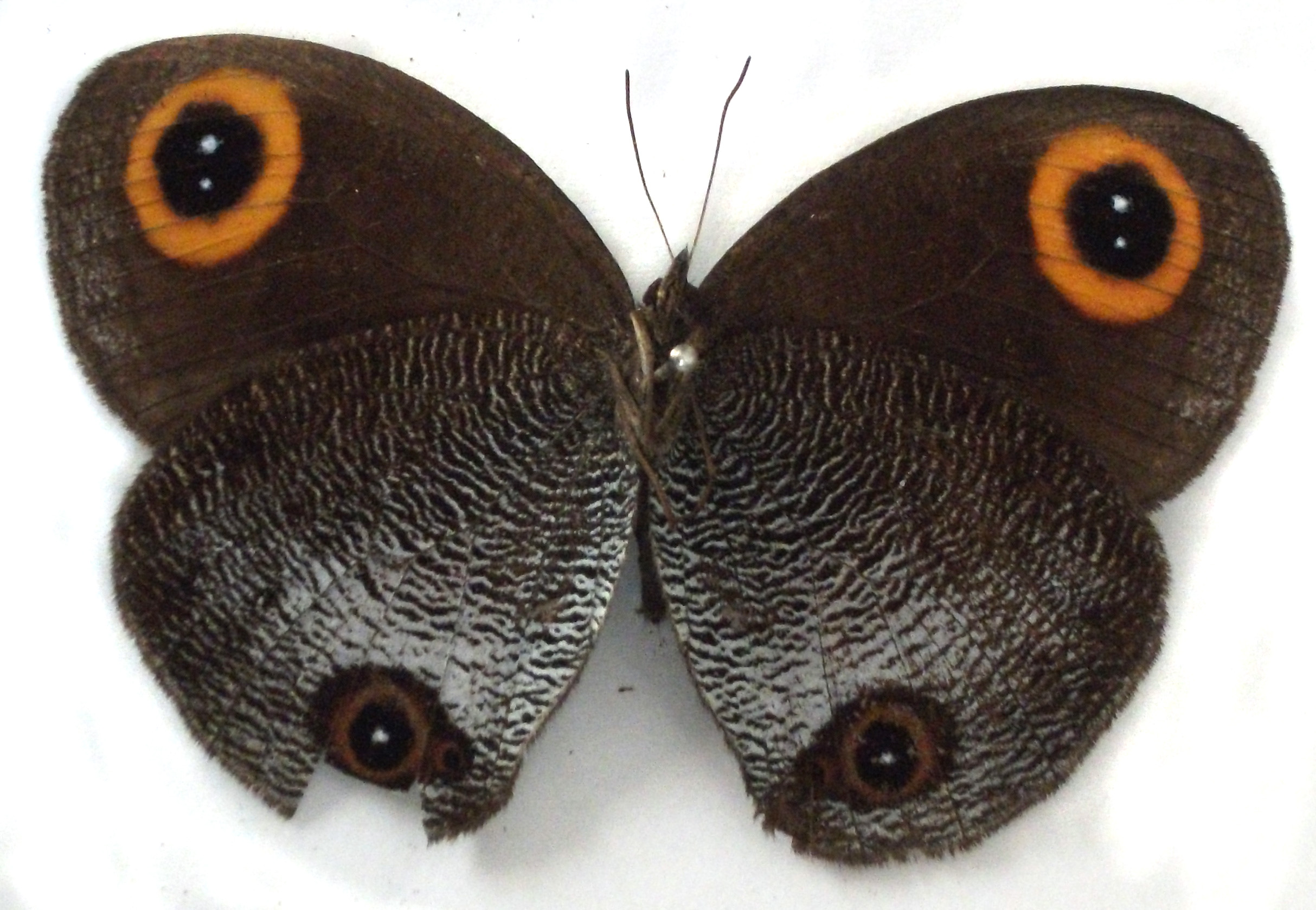
Male ventral view holotype #982926

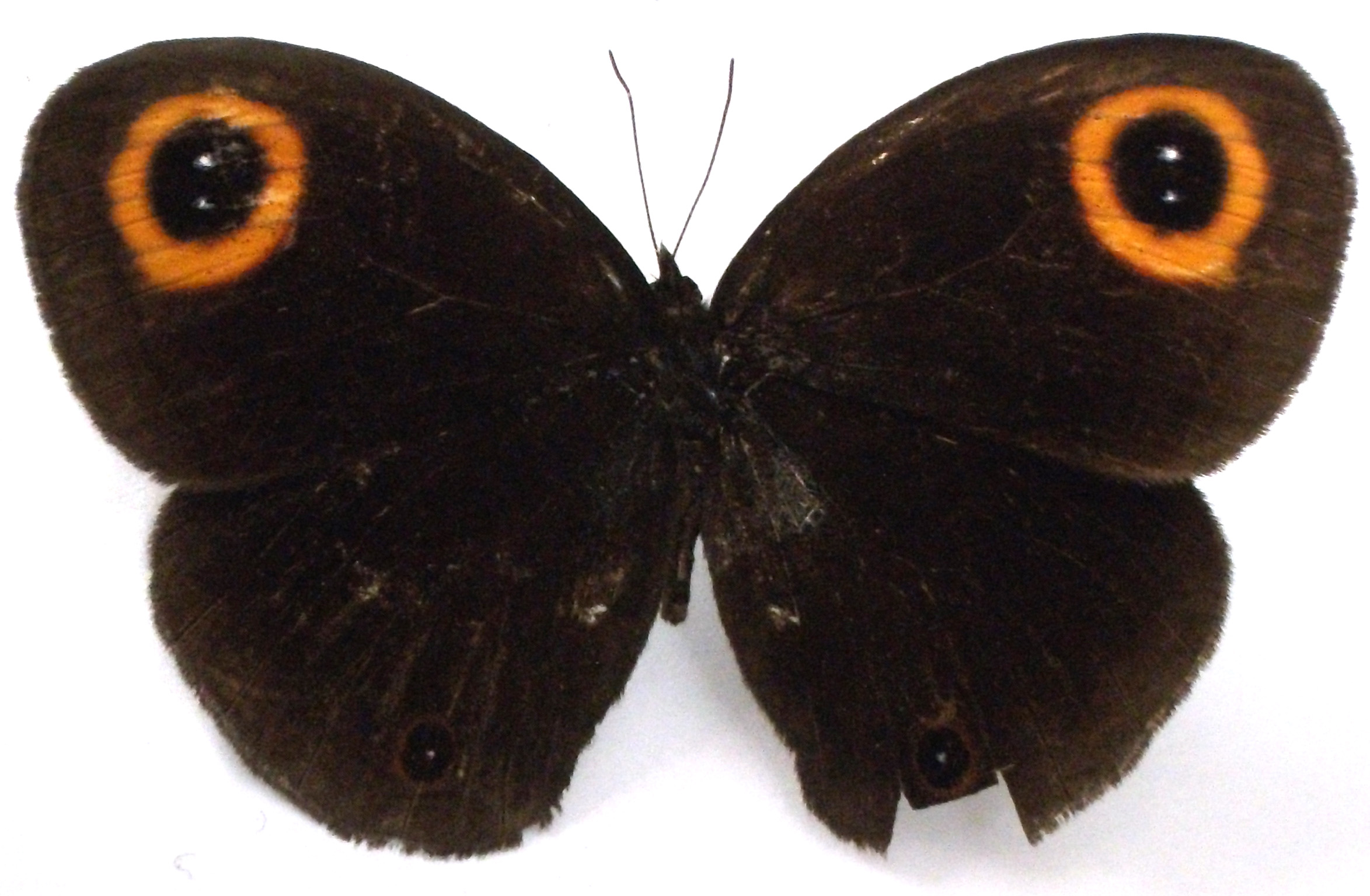
Male dorsal view holotype #982926

=== Male ===
Holotype: # 982926, 24.vii.1987, male. Forewing length 34mm. 28.880N & 95.850E ±10 km, c.1,830m, Mithun Valley, Upper Dibang Valley District, Arunachal Pradesh, India, coll. Purnendu Roy, the Natural History Museum, London.

Upperside: Ground colour dark chocolate brown, slightly blackish, paler towards margins. Very large round orange-ringed apical ocellus (11mm), black inner with two white pupils. Edges of ring distinct and regular. Hindwing single tornal ocellus in space 2. Narrow reddish ring, black inner and white pupil.

Underside: Ground colour dark chocolate. Forewing apical ocellus large as on upperside, but with an additional thin reddish outer ring. Forewing termen margin covered with a thin scattering of white scales tapering towards tornus. Hindwing white scales forming prominent small lines (striae) with slight violet tones covering the whole wing apart from a narrow area around the tornal ocelli. Striae become darker towards the costa and apex giving a fading effect. In the basal half they are more separate and alternate with the dark brown ground colour producing a distinctive snow-drift like appearance. They are densest towards the discal region in spaces 1, 2 and 3 where they merge with one another. Hindwing two tornal ocelli, ocellus in space 2 much larger than 1c which is blind. Both ocelli orange-ringed with a black centre. Ocellus in space 2 with a white pupil.

=== Female ===
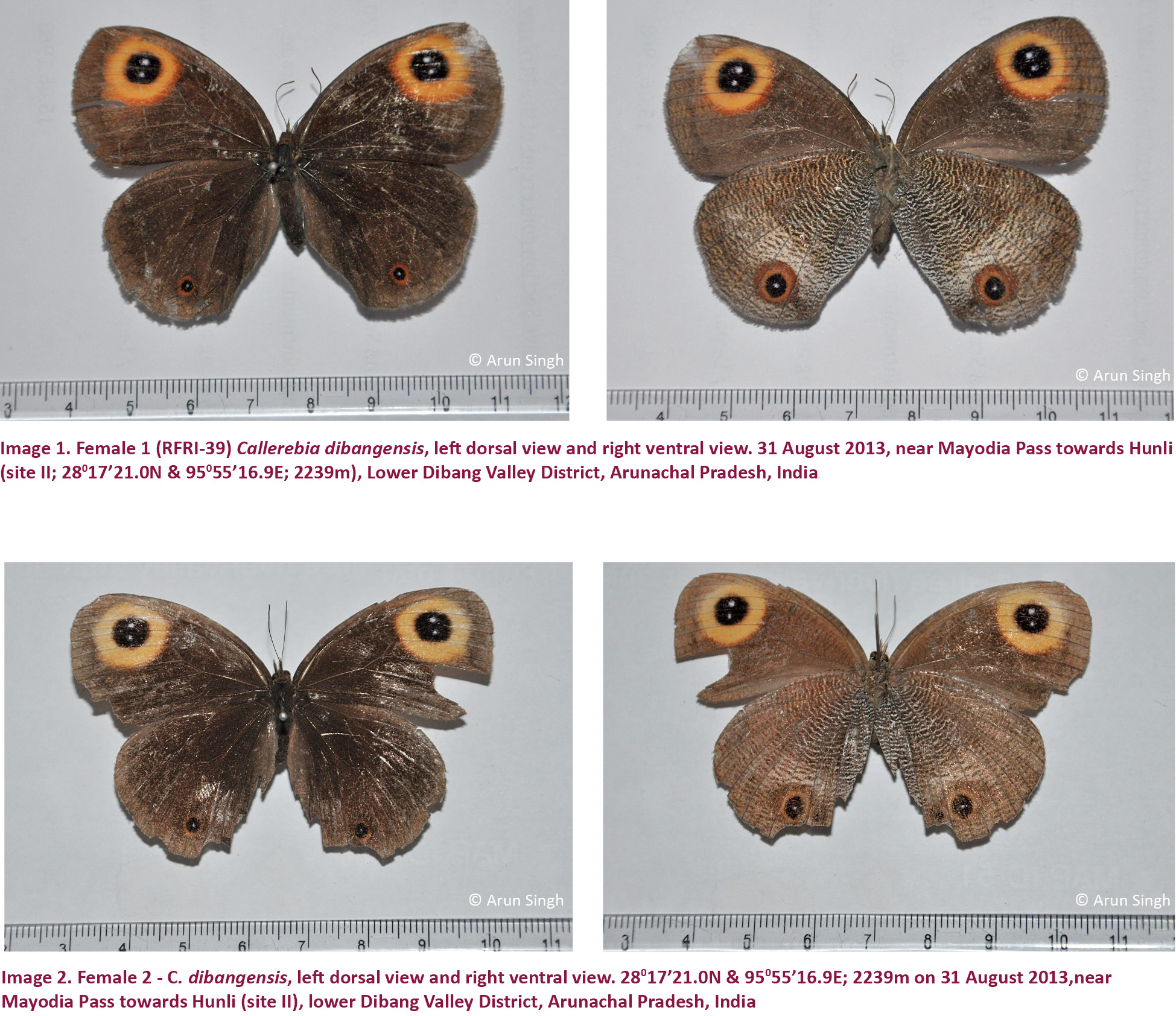
Female RFRI-39

Female (RFRI-39):Forewing length 35mm, 28017’21.0N & 95055’16.9E, elevation 2239m, Near Mayodia Pass towards Hunli, Lower Dibang Valley, Arunachal Pradesh, India, 29 August 2013. coll. Arun P. Singh, Ecology & Biodiversity Division, Rain Forest Research Institute, Jorhat, Assam.

Upperside: Ground colour dark chocolate brown, slightly blackish, paler towards margins. Very large round orange-ringed apical ocellus (11mm), black inner with two white pupils. Edges of ring distinct and regular. Hindwing single tornal ocellus in space 2. Narrow reddish ring, black inner and white pupil.

Underside: Ground colour dark chocolate. Forewing apical ocellus large as on upperside, but with an additional thin reddish outer ring. Forewing termen margin covered with a thin scattering of white scales tapering towards tornus. Hindwing white scales forming prominent small striae with slight violet tones covering the whole wing apart from a narrow area around the tornal ocelli. Striae darker towards the costa and apex. In the basal half they are more separate and alternate with the dark brown ground colour producing a distinctive snow-drift like appearance. They are densest towards the discal region in spaces 1, 2 and 3 where they merge with one another. Hindwing has one tornal ocelli with white pupil, in space 2, much larger than 1c and also has a red in the dark space surrounding it. Both the ocelli are orange ringed. Ocellus in space 1 absent in this specimen but may be present as a minute dot in females.

== Etymology ==
Named after the Dibang Valley District in Arunachal Pradesh, India.

== See also ==
- Satyrinae
- Nymphalidae
- List of butterflies of India (Satyrinae)
