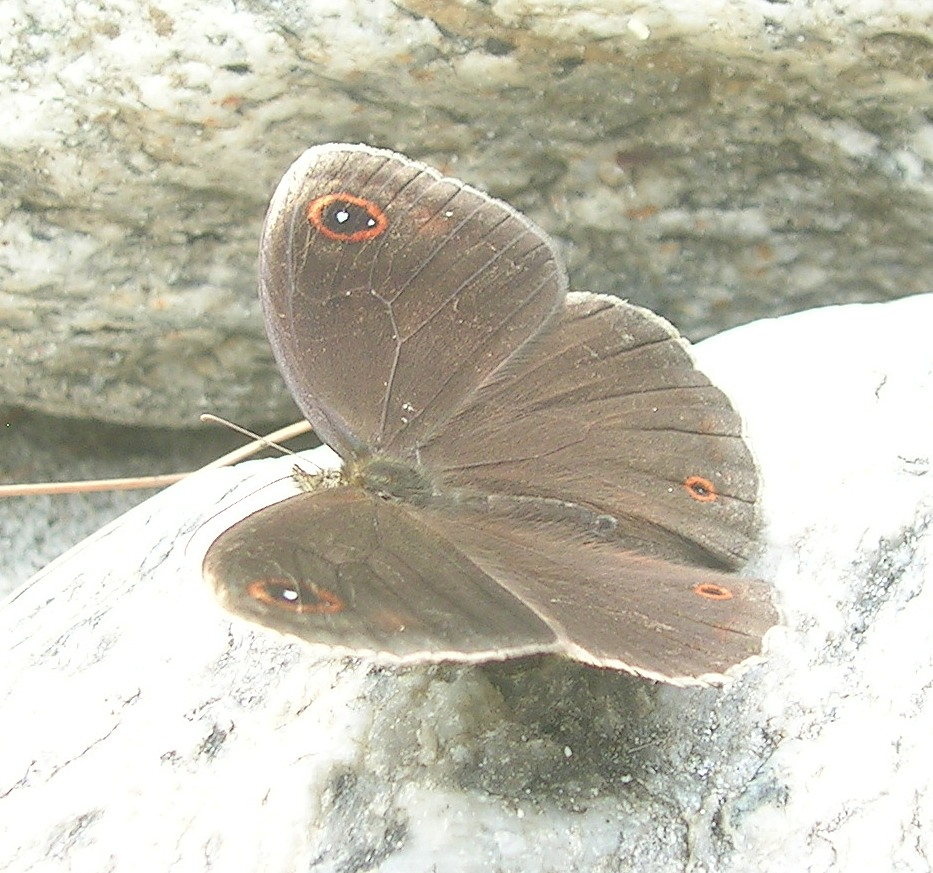

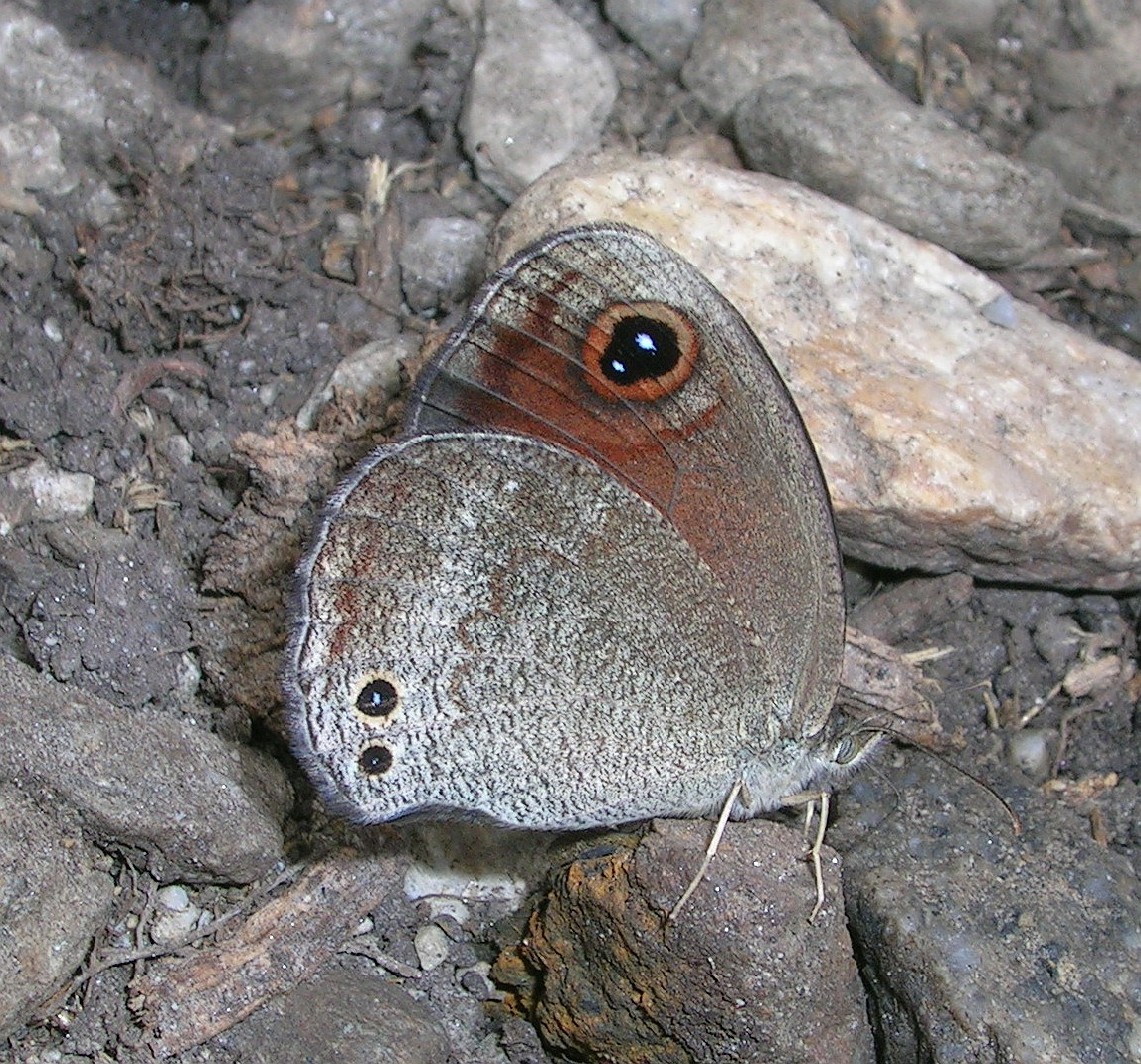

Scientific classification
- Kingdom: Animalia
- Phylum: Arthropoda
- Class: Insecta
- Order: Lepidoptera
- Family: Nymphalidae
- Genus: Callerebia
- Species: C. scanda

Binomial name
- Callerebia scanda Kollar, 1844

= Callerebia scanda =

Pallid argus

Species of butterfly

Callerebia scanda, the pallid argus, is a brown (Satyrinae) butterfly that is found in the Himalayas.

== Range ==
The butterfly is found in Afghanistan, and the Himalayas from Safed Koh, Astor, Chilas, Gilgit, Chitral, Kashmir and Kulu eastwards across to Sikkim.

== Status ==
As per William Harry Evans, it is common from Chitral to Sikkim, and not rare westwards.

== See also ==
- Satyrinae
- Nymphalidae
- List of butterflies of India (Satyrinae)
