= Arthur Moffatt Lang =

Arthur Moffatt Lang (1832 - 1916), was a British engineer in the East India Company, and collector of butterflies.

== Publications ==
- Lang, Arthur Moffatt (1992). Lahore to Lucknow : the Indian Mutiny journal of Arthur Moffatt Lang. London : L. Cooper. ISBN 978-0-85052-203-7.
