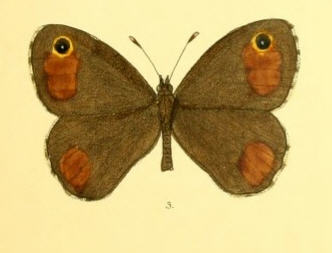
- Upperside
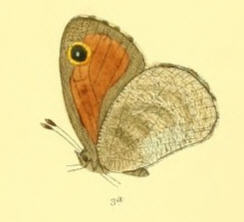
- Underside

Scientific classification
- Kingdom: Animalia
- Phylum: Arthropoda
- Clade: Pancrustacea
- Class: Insecta
- Order: Lepidoptera
- Family: Nymphalidae
- Genus: Paralasa
- Species: P. kalinda

Binomial name
- Paralasa kalinda Moore, 1865

Synonyms
- Erebia kalinda; Callerebia kalinda

= Paralasa kalinda =

Species of butterfly

Paralasa kalinda, commonly known as the scarce mountain argus, is a butterfly in the family Nymphalidae. It is found from Afghanistan to Kashmir. It was described by Frederic Moore in 1865. This species is monotypic.

== Description ==
The underside hindwing is brownish, dusted with greyish-white, and having small white spots. The underside forewing has an ocellus and the area surrounding the ocellus is tawny red. The upperside has a double-pupilled ocellus on the forewing, like the underside forewing, and the red streaks on the upperside are much more in comparison to the similar Paralasa shallada.

The wingspan of this species is about 5 cm.

== Habits and Habitat ==
This species is a weak flyer and is seen basking on bushes or on outcrops. It is commonly seen along roads and hillslopes.

It has been recorded from 2200 to 4800 metres in the Himalaya.
