= Periyar National Park =

Protected area in Kerala

- IUCN category II (national park)
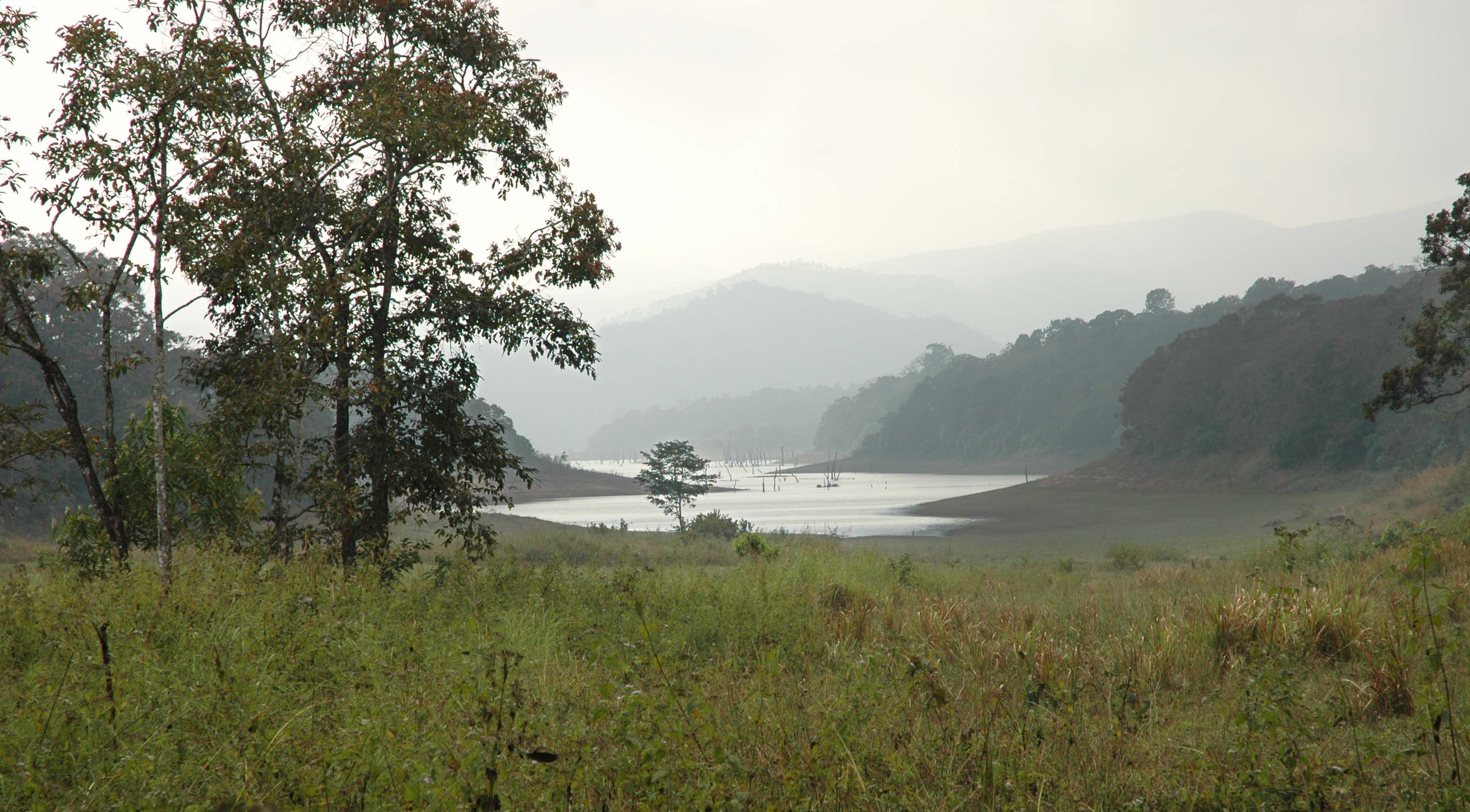

- Location within Kerala Location within India
- Interactive map of Periyar National Park
- Location: Idukki and Pathanamthitta, Kerala state, India
- Nearest city: Kottayam, Kochi
- Coordinates: 9°34′39″N 77°10′48″E
- Area: 350.54 km^{2} (135.34 sq mi)
- Established: 1934-1950 (as Nellikkaampetty Game Sanctuary), 1950-present (as Periyar Wildlife Sanctuary)
- Visitors: 754,306 (in 2016)
- Governing body: Govt of India & Department of Forests and Wildlife (Kerala) Field Director: Sri. Georgi P Mathechan Deputy Director: Smt. Silpa V. Kumar

Periyar National Park and Wildlife Sanctuary (PNP) is a protected area located in the districts of Idukki and Pathanamthitta in Kerala, India. It is a renowned elephant and tiger reserve. The protected area encompasses 925 km^{2} (357 mi^{2}), of which 350.54 km^{2} (135.34 mi^{2}) of the main zone was declared as the Periyar National Park in 1982. The park is a repository of rare, endemic, and endangered flora and fauna and forms the major watershed of two important rivers of Kerala: the Periyar and the Pamba.

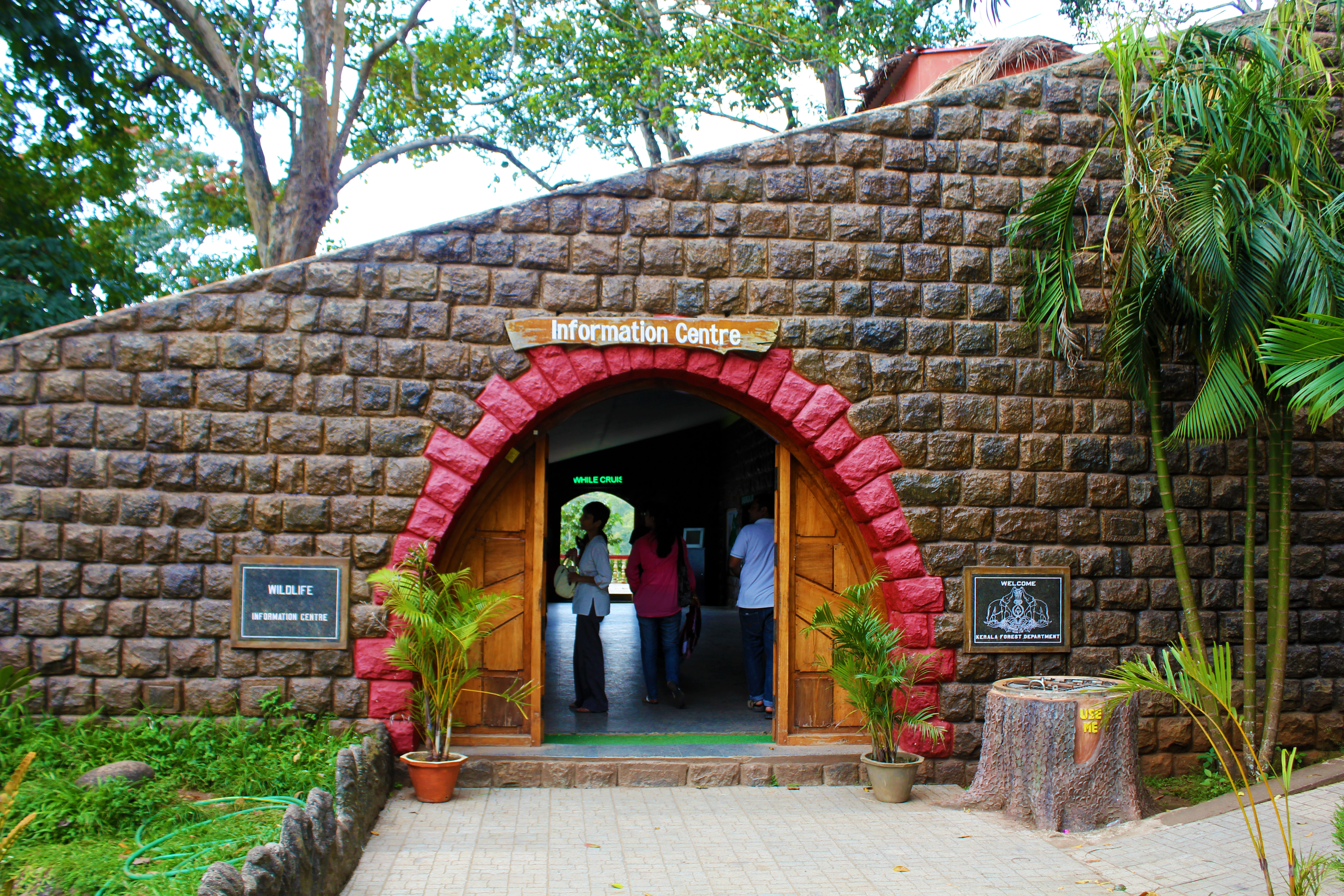
Entrance to Information Centre at Periyar National Park

The park is located high in the Cardamom Hills and Pandalam Hills of the south Western Ghats along the border with Tamil Nadu. It is 4 km (2.5 mi) from Kumily, Thekkady, 86 km (53 mi) south east of Thodupuzha, 103 km (64 mi) east of Kottayam, 110 km (68 mi) west of Madurai and 147 km (91 mi) southeast of Kochi.

== History ==
The first official action towards the conservation of wildlife and biodiversity in Kerala was taken in 1934 by the Maharaja of Travancore, Chithira Thirunal Balarama Varma, by declaring the forests around Periyar lake as a private reserve to stop the encroachment of tea plantations. It was founded as Nellikkampatty Reserve. It was consolidated as a wildlife sanctuary in 1950 after the political integration of India. The sanctuary was included in Project Tiger, a Central Government initiative, and was renamed the Periyar Tiger Reserve in 1978.

== Geography ==
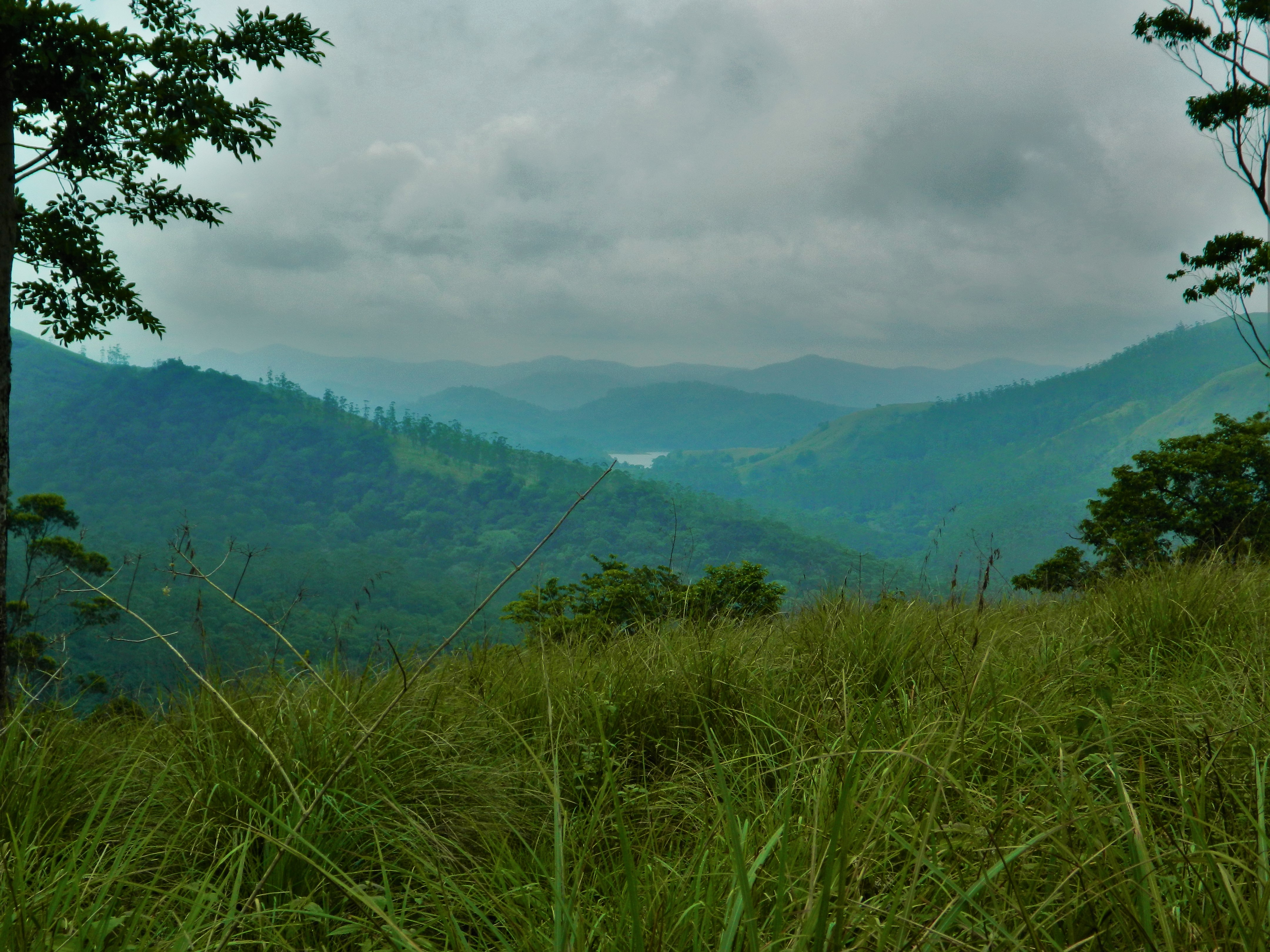
The misty mountain ranges of the Periyar region

Periyar National Park lies in the middle of a mountainous area of the Cardamom Hills. In the north, the boundary commences from the point nearest to the Medaganam in the interstate boundary up to Vellimalai. To the east the boundary follows the inter-state boundary from Vellimalai to Kallimalai Peak (1615 m) it is bounded by mountain ridges of over 1,700 m (5,600 ft) altitude. Toward the west it expands into a 1,200 m (3,900 ft) high plateau. From this level the altitude drops steeply to the deepest point of the reserve, the 100 metre valley of the Pamba River. The highest peak in the park is the 2,019 m (6,624 ft) high Kottamala, the southernmost peak in India higher than 2,000 metres (6,562 ft). The Periyar and Pamba Rivers originate in the forests of the reserve, both in Mlappara. The other prominent peaks within the park are Pachayarmala, Vellimala, Sunderamala, Chokkampetti mala and Karimala. The topography consists of steep and rolling hills which are thickly wooded.

The sanctuary surrounds Periyar Lake, a reservoir measuring 31 km^{2} (12 mi^{2}), which was formed when the Mullaperiyar Dam was erected in 1895. The reservoir and the Periyar River meander around the contours of the wooded hills, providing a permanent source of water for the local wildlife.

== Climate ==
The temperature varies depending upon the altitude, ranging between 15 °C in December and January and 31 °C in April and May. Annual precipitation is between 2000 and 3000 mm, with about two-thirds occurring during the southwest monsoon between June and September. Much of the rest occurs during the northeast monsoon between October and December. Summers are warm with some precipitation in April and winters are cold.

== Boundaries ==
- North: The boundary commences from the point nearest to the Medaganam in the interstate boundary up to Vellimalai.
- East: Thence the boundary follows the inter-state boundary from Vellimalai to Kallimalai Peak (1615 m).
- South: Thence the boundary follows along the main ridge to Chokkampettymalai Peak (1805 m). Thence along the main ridge to Udumalai (1594 m) (the same boundary which divides Ranni Forest Division and existing Periyar Tiger Reserve).
- West: Thence the boundary proceeds due north along the main ridge dividing Periyar Tiger Reserve and Ranni Forest Division to Manikamalai and thence along the ridge to Sundaramalai 1813 m from Sundaramalai the boundary runs along the main ridge to Mangaladevi top 1737 m, and thence to Pachimalai top 1805 m from Puchimala top the boundary follows the Nallah in itself bank, Nallah coming from Mannarkavala and then proceed along Cherakottai river until it joins the Periyar lake between Pandaravara-malai and Poupara.

== Flora ==
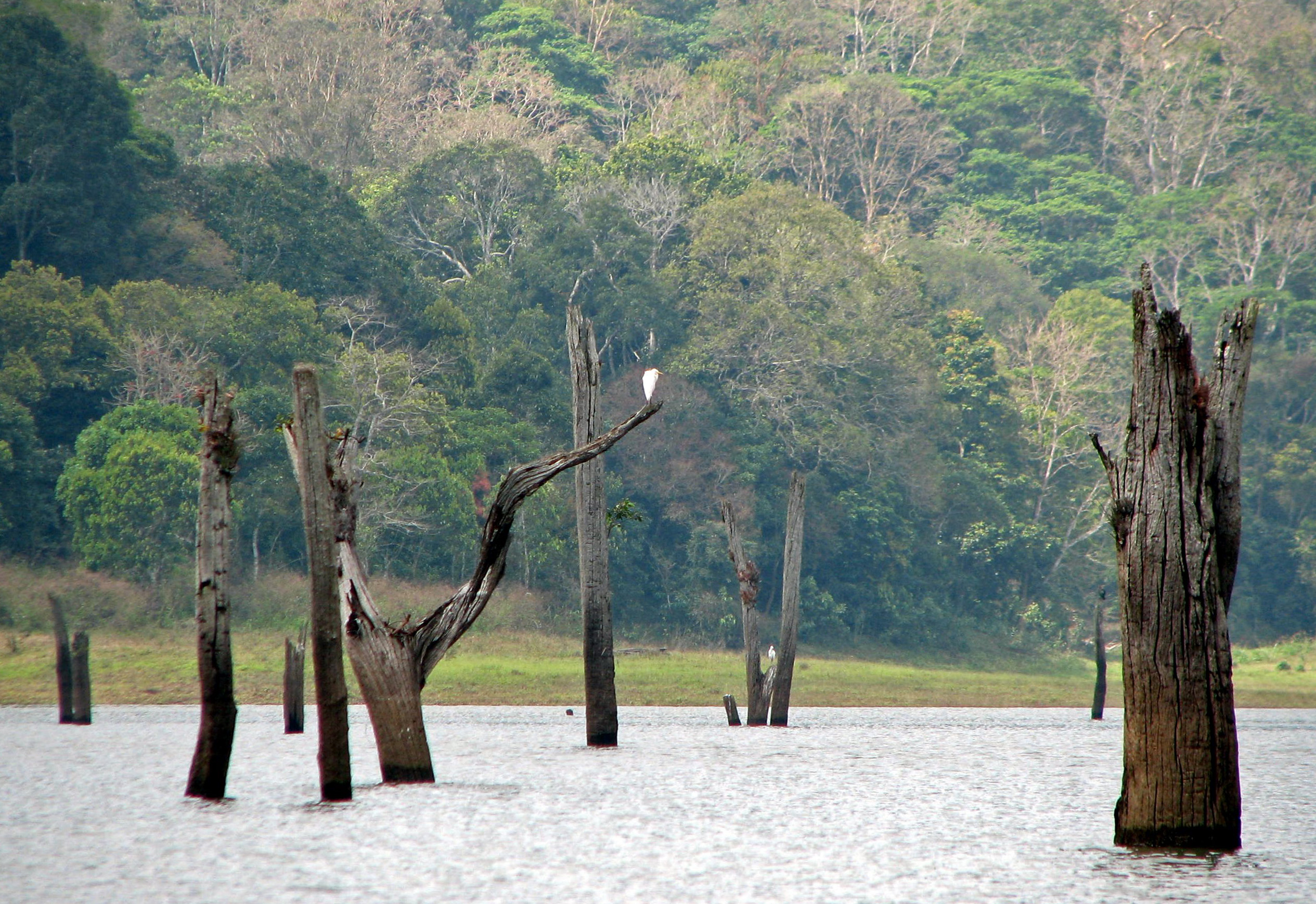
Submerged trees in Periyar Lake

The park is made up of Tropical and subtropical moist broadleaf forests, montane grasslands and shrublands, montane savannas, human-made stands of eucalyptus, wetlands, and lake and river ecosystems. A total of 1965 taxa (species and infraspecific) of flowering plants have been collected and described from the park. These include 17 species categorized as "possibly extinct". Out of the aforementioned flowering plant taxa, about 171 species of grass and 140 species of orchids have been recorded within the park. The grasses are found in the open grasslands found on the edges of the water bodies and montane habitats where fire resistant vegetation grows and dense grasses like elephant grass are found. Various herbivores such as sambar, Asian elephants, gaur and wild boar have been observed to graze here.

Forests found here are composed of deciduous, evergreen and semi evergreen trees like teak, rosewoods, terminalia, sandalwoods, mangoes, jamun, tamarind, banyans, sacred fig, kino tree, bamboos, Diospyros bourdillonii, Hopea parviflora, Dipterocarpus indicus, Semecarpus travancoricus and the only south Indian conifer, Nageia wallichiana. The medicinal gloriosa lily grows in the park. The endemic flora include Habenaria periyarensis and Syzygium periyarense.

The park is surrounded by agricultural regions, especially plantations of such crops as tea, cardamom, and coffee.

== Fauna ==
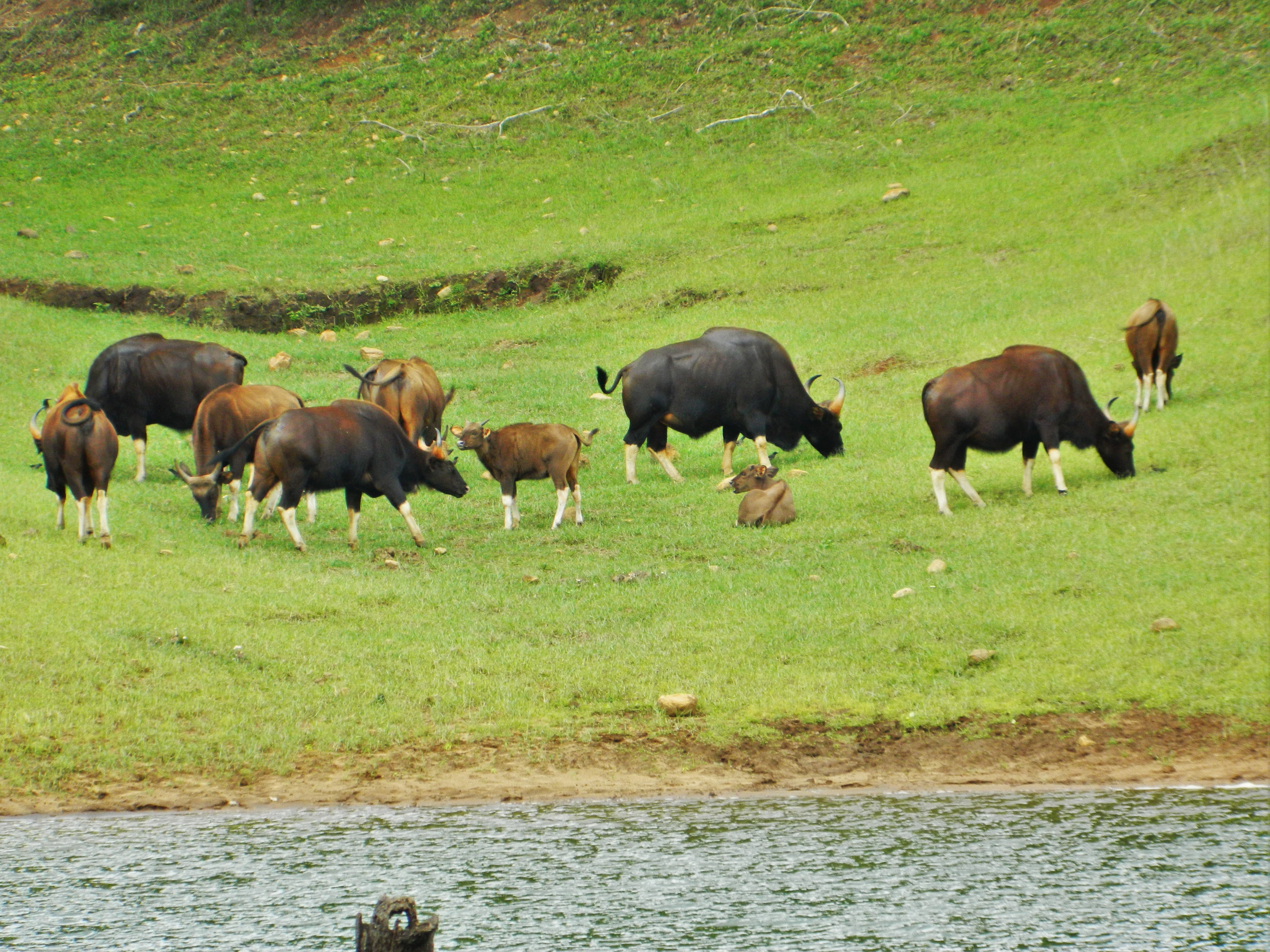
Herd of gaur at Periyar Lake

=== Mammals ===
Tiger

Periyar National Park is an important tiger and elephant reserve. A total of 35 Bengal tigers were counted across 925 km^{2} (357 sq mi) in 2017. It is valuable for the Indian elephant, and a few white tigers also occur. Other mammals include the gaur, sambar deer, wild boar, Indian giant squirrel, Travancore flying squirrel, jungle cat, dhole, sloth bear, Nilgiri tahr, lion-tailed macaque, Nilgiri langur, Salim Ali's fruit bat, stripe-necked mongoose, and Nilgiri marten.

=== Birds ===
About 266 species of birds occur in the park, including migrants. Endemic birds include the Malabar grey hornbill, Nilgiri wood pigeon, blue-winged parakeet, Nilgiri flycatcher, crimson-backed sunbird, white-bellied redstart, and black-necked stork.

During a four-day survey in December 2016, the presence of 13 new bird and 16 butterfly species was detected, including Eurasian woodcock (Scolopax rusticola), steppe gull (Larus fuscus barbensis), grey-necked bunting (Emberiza bruniceps) and paddyfield warbler (Acrocephalus agricola).

=== Reptiles ===
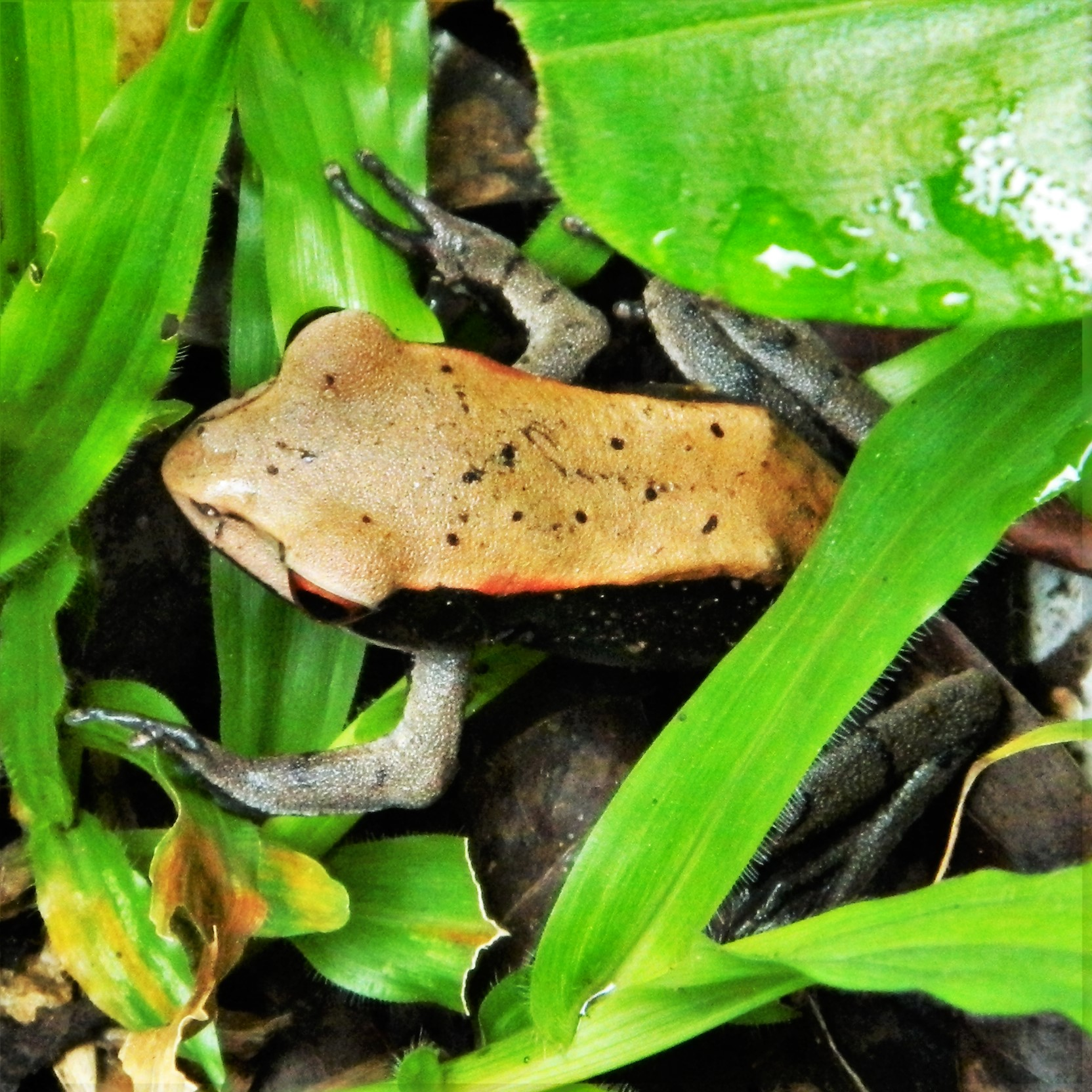
Bicolored frog Clinotarsus curtipes

There are 45 species of reptiles - 30 snakes, 13 lizards, and two turtles. Snakes include the king cobra, Malabar pit viper, and striped coral snake.

=== Amphibians ===
Amphibians in the park include caecilians, frogs, and toads such as the Malabar gliding frog, Asian toad, fungoid frog and bicolored frog.

=== Fish ===
About 40 species of fish inhabit the local lakes and rivers, including the Periyar trout, Periyar latia, Periyar barb, channa barb, and Travancoria loach.

=== Insects ===
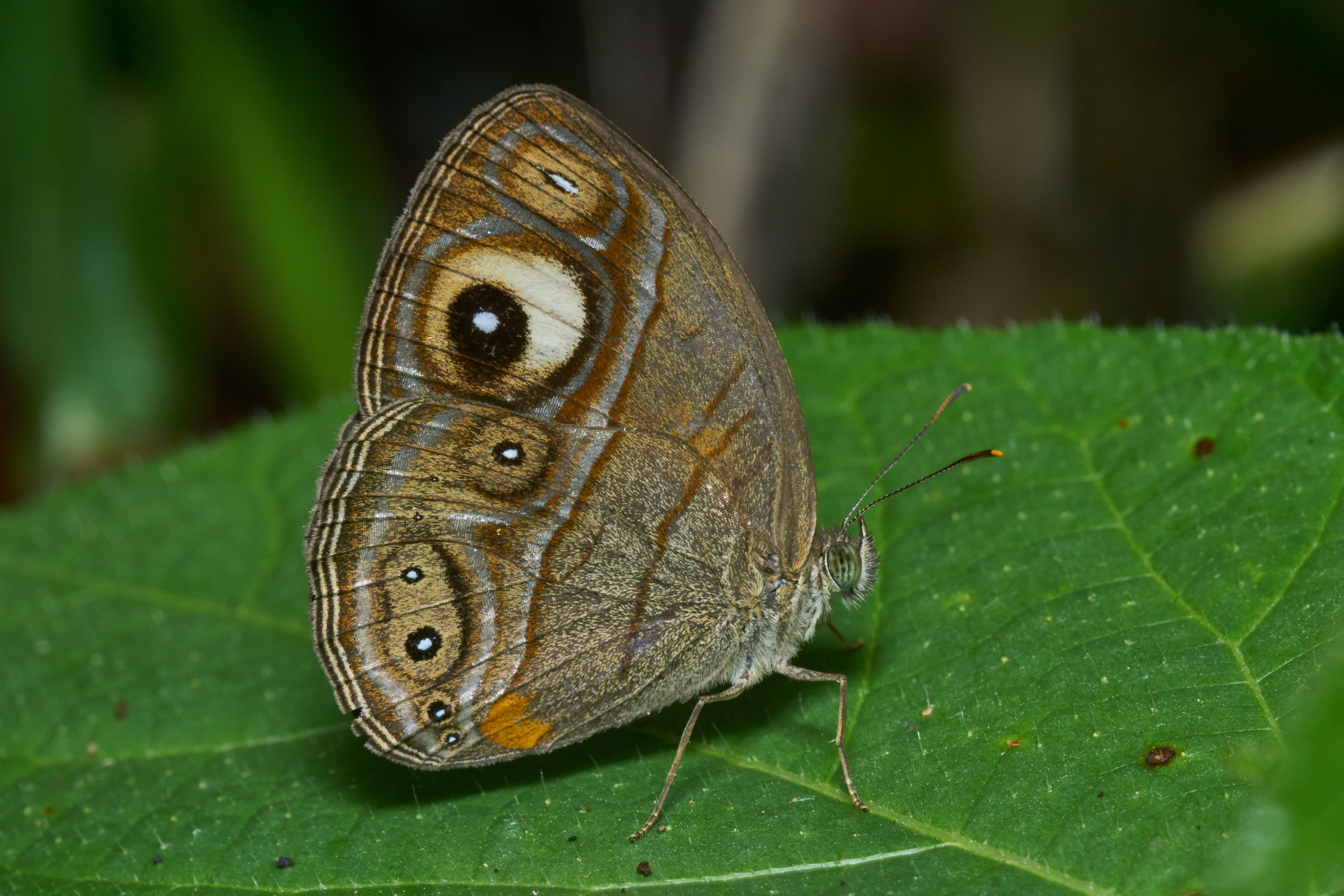
Mycalesis patnia junonia in Periyar National Park

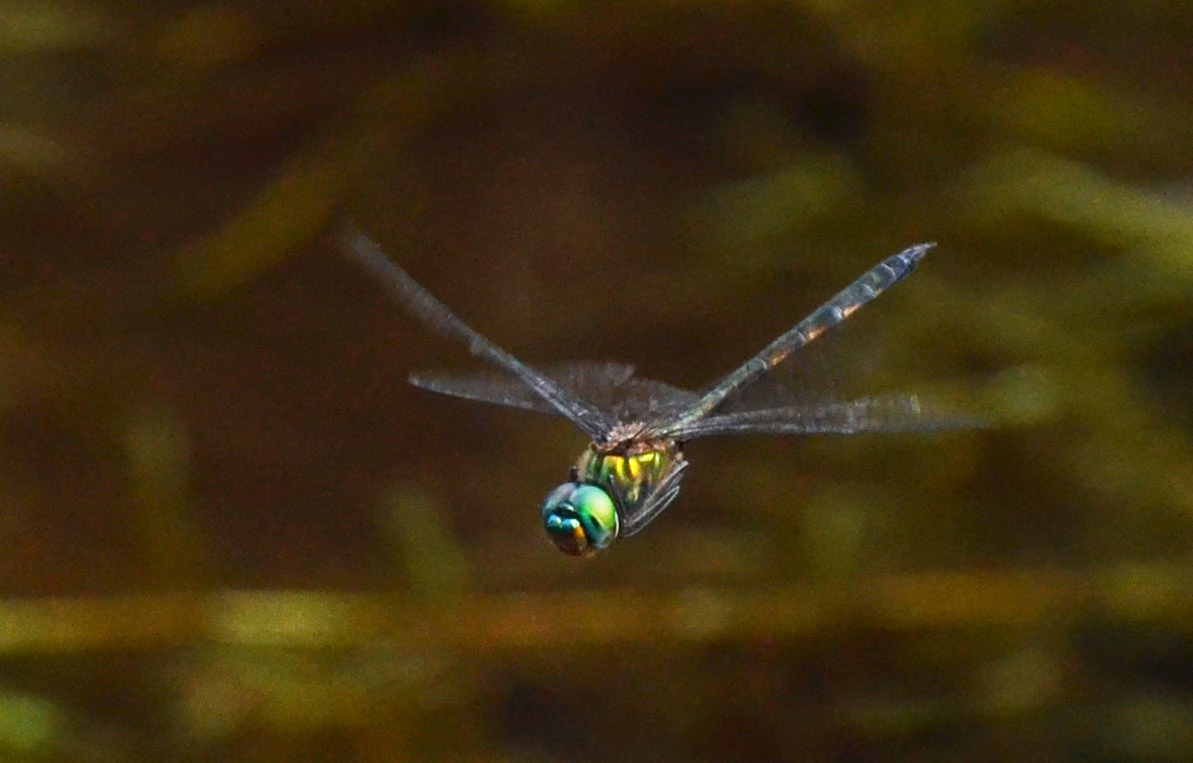
Hemicordulia asiatica in Periyar National Park

There are about 160 butterfly taxa, including South India's largest butterfly, the southern birdwing; lime butterfly; Malabar tree nymph; Indian awlking; Evershed's ace, which is endemic to the South Western Ghats; southern spotted ace, which is also endemic to the southern parts of the western ghats, but is more common and with a greater range than T. evershedi; Madras ace; the highly threatened Travancore evening brown, which can only be found in cane brakes; various kinds of uncommon Mycalesis species (the bushbrowns), some of which are endemic to the Western Ghats; and many kinds of moths, such as the Southern Atlas moth. A survey jointly conducted by the Periyar Tiger Conservation Foundation, Indian Dragonfly Society and the Forest and Wildlife Department in October 2017 found 77 species of odonata, including the Asian emerald (Hemicordulia asiatica). A survey jointly conducted by the same team in September 2018 found eight more new species.

== History ==
- 1895 – Construction of the Mullaperiyar Dam
- 1899 – Formation of the Periyar Lake Reserve
- 1933 – S.C.H. Robinson made the first game warden
- 1934 – Formation of Nellikkampatty Game Sanctuary
- 1950 – Consolidation of Periyar as a wildlife sanctuary
- 1978 – Declaration of Periyar as a tiger reserve
- 1982 – Preliminary notification of the core area as a national park
- 1991 – Brought under Project Elephant
- 1996 – India Eco-development Project launched
- 2001 – Divided into Periyar East and Periyar West
- 2004 – Formation of Periyar Foundation
- 2007 – 148 km^{2} of the Goodrical Range added to the reserve
- 2011 – The management of Periyar Tiger Reserve assessed as "very good" by the National Tiger Conservation Authority and the Union Ministry of Environment and Forests
- 2012 - An additional 148 km^{2} of evergreen forest at Ponnambalamedu added to the reserve

== Ecosystem valuation ==
It is estimated that the Periyar Tiger Reserve (PTR) provides flow benefits worth 17.6 billion rupees (1.9 lakh (190,000)/hectare) annually. Important ecosystem services included gene-pool protection (7.86 billion), water provisioning to districts of Tamil Nadu (4.05 billion), habitat and refugia for wildlife (3.55 billion), employment generation for local communities (25 million), water purification services to nearby towns and districts (483 million) and recreation value (425 million).

== See also ==
- Karimpuzha Wildlife Sanctuary
- List of birds of South India
- Ranni Forest Division
