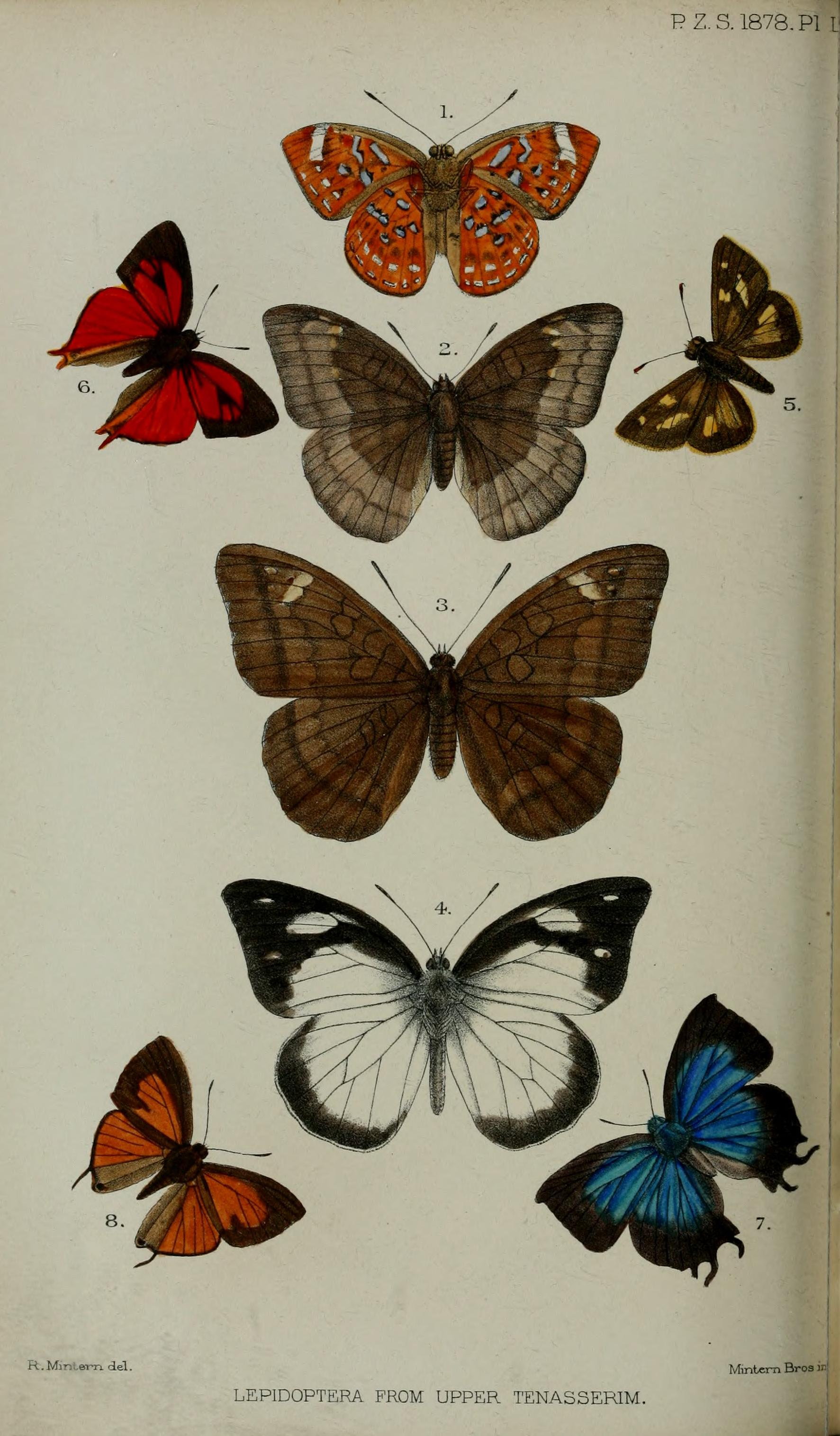
- Plate accompanying the original description

Scientific classification
- Kingdom: Animalia
- Phylum: Arthropoda
- Class: Insecta
- Order: Lepidoptera
- Family: Hesperiidae
- Genus: Thoressa
- Species: T. masoni

Binomial name
- Thoressa masoni (Moore, [1879])

= Thoressa masoni =

Species of butterfly

Thoressa masoni, or Mason's ace is a butterfly in the family Hesperiidae. It was described by Frederic Moore in 1879. It is found in the Indomalayan realm in Burma, Thailand, Laos and Vietnam. Above the hindwing disc has one or several yellow spots which, in contrast to honorei, are distinctly defined; the one situate at the cross-vein is the largest and brightest.
