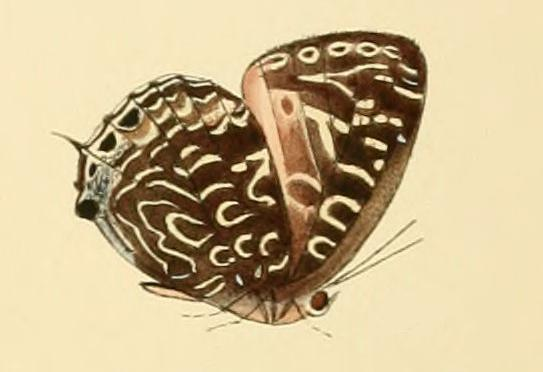

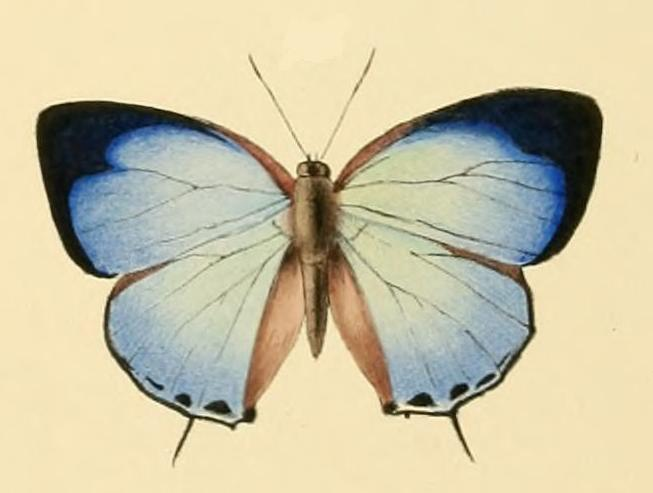

Scientific classification
- Kingdom: Animalia
- Phylum: Arthropoda
- Clade: Pancrustacea
- Class: Insecta
- Order: Lepidoptera
- Family: Lycaenidae
- Genus: Arhopala
- Species: A. theba

Binomial name
- Arhopala theba (Hewitson, 1863)

Synonyms
- Amblypodia theba Hewitson, 1863

= Arhopala theba =

Species of butterfly

Arhopala theba is a species of butterfly of the family Lycaenidae. It is found in the Philippines on the island of Mindanao.

== Description ==
Like Arhopala bazaloides, but much larger, the ground¬colour beneath, except before the tornus of the forewing, nowhere lighter, but quite dark chocolate, whereasthe markings are almost purely ivory-white. Above the male is of a wonderful morpho blue colour; a purple reflection on the costal portion, the costa and distal margin are rather broad black; hindwing with a broad black costa and a narrow black distal margin exhibiting dark internerval dots. Female above dark brown, basaland central areas blue.
