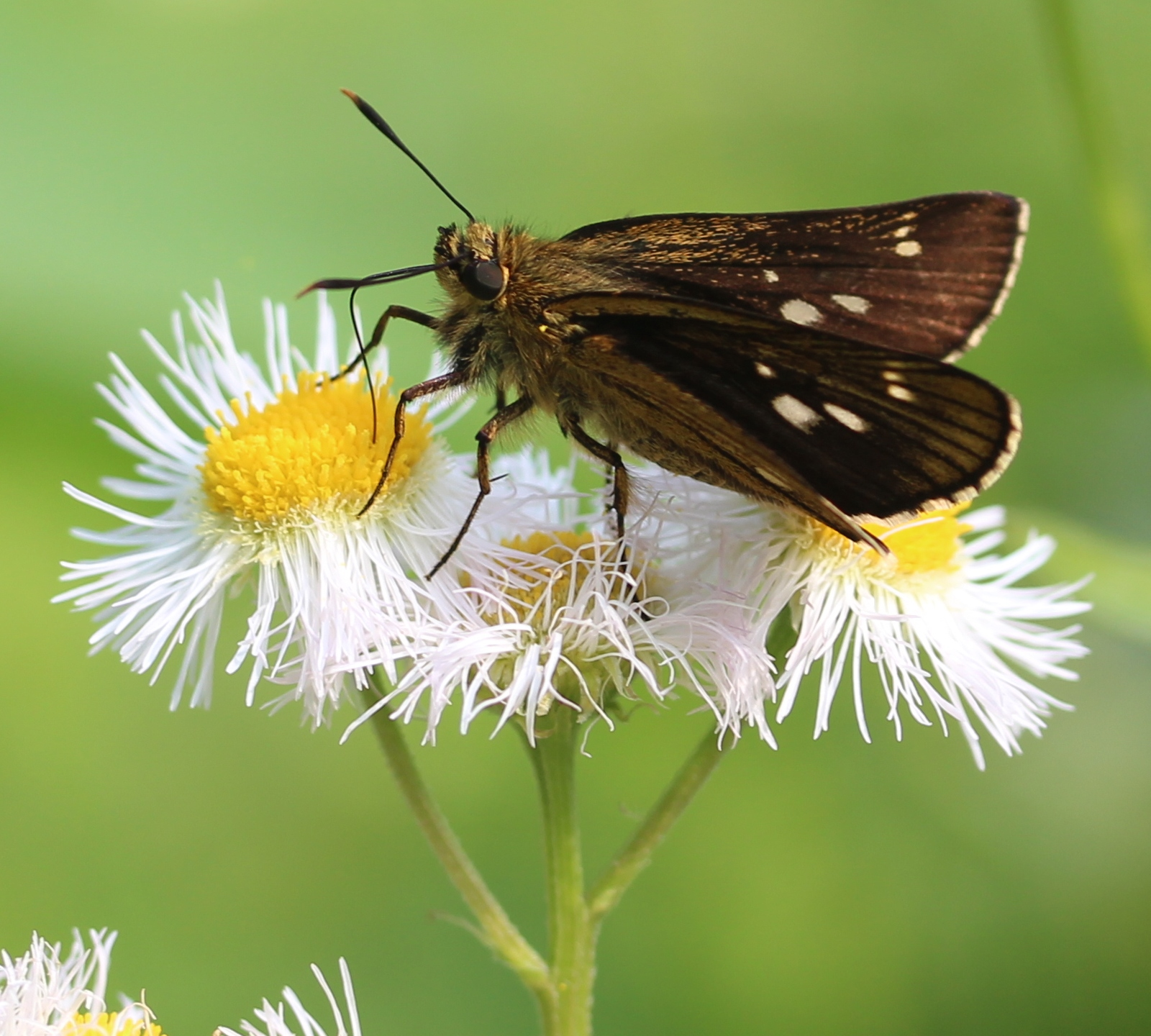

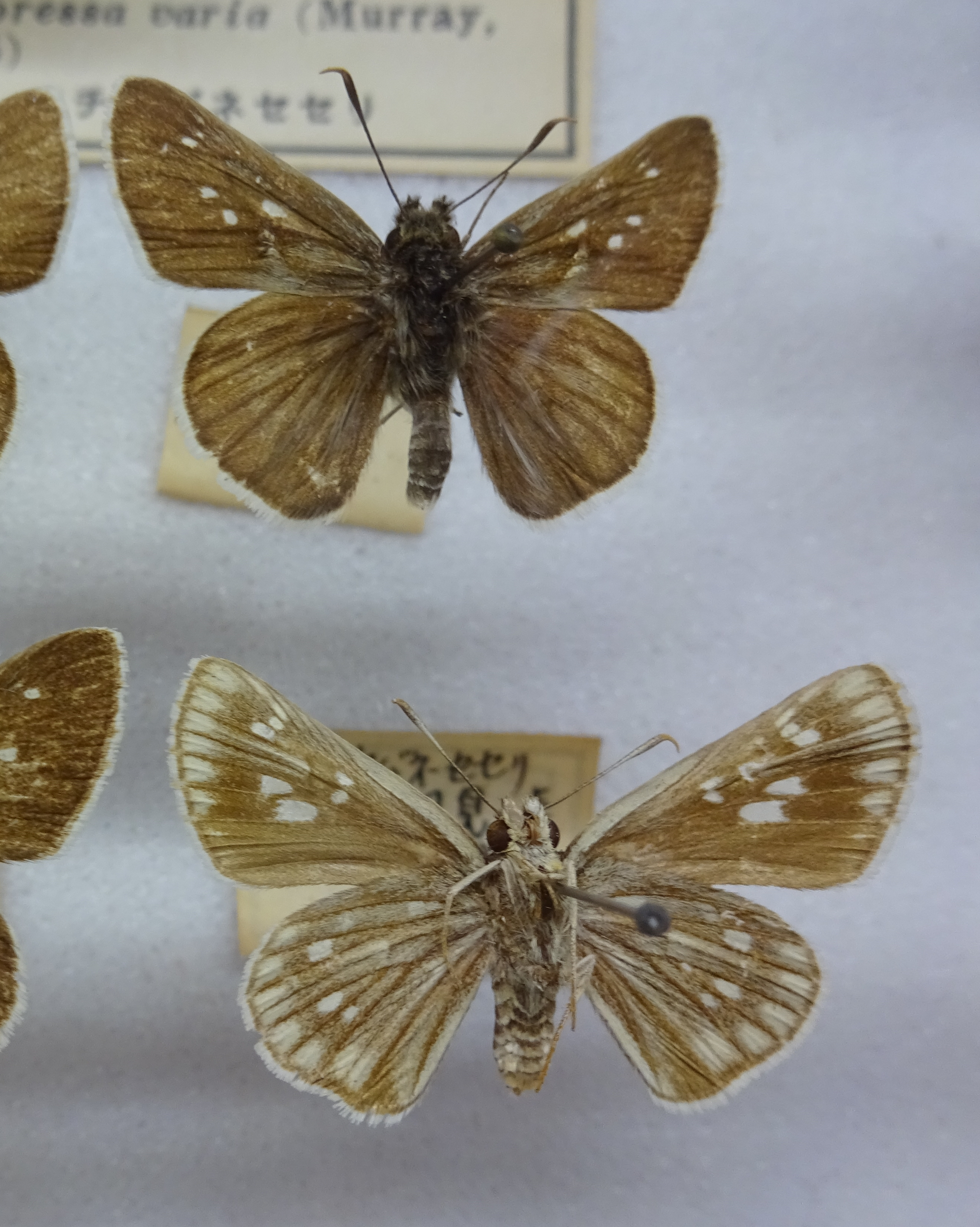

Scientific classification
- Kingdom: Animalia
- Phylum: Arthropoda
- Class: Insecta
- Order: Lepidoptera
- Family: Hesperiidae
- Genus: Thoressa
- Species: T. varia

Binomial name
- Thoressa varia (Murray, 1875)

Synonyms
- Pamphila varia (Murray, 1875); Halpe melancholica (Bryk, 1942)

= Thoressa varia =

Species of butterfly

Thoressa varia is a butterfly of the family Hesperiidae. It is found on the islands of eastern Asia, including the Sakhalin Islands and Kuril Islands, Japan, the Korean Peninsula and north-eastern China. Its Japanese common name kochabane-seseri can be translated as "small brown wing" (ko means "small" and chabane means "brown wings").

The length of the forewings is 16–18 mm. Adults are on wing each year from June to July. There are one to two generations per year.

The larvae feed on Sasa kurilensis.
