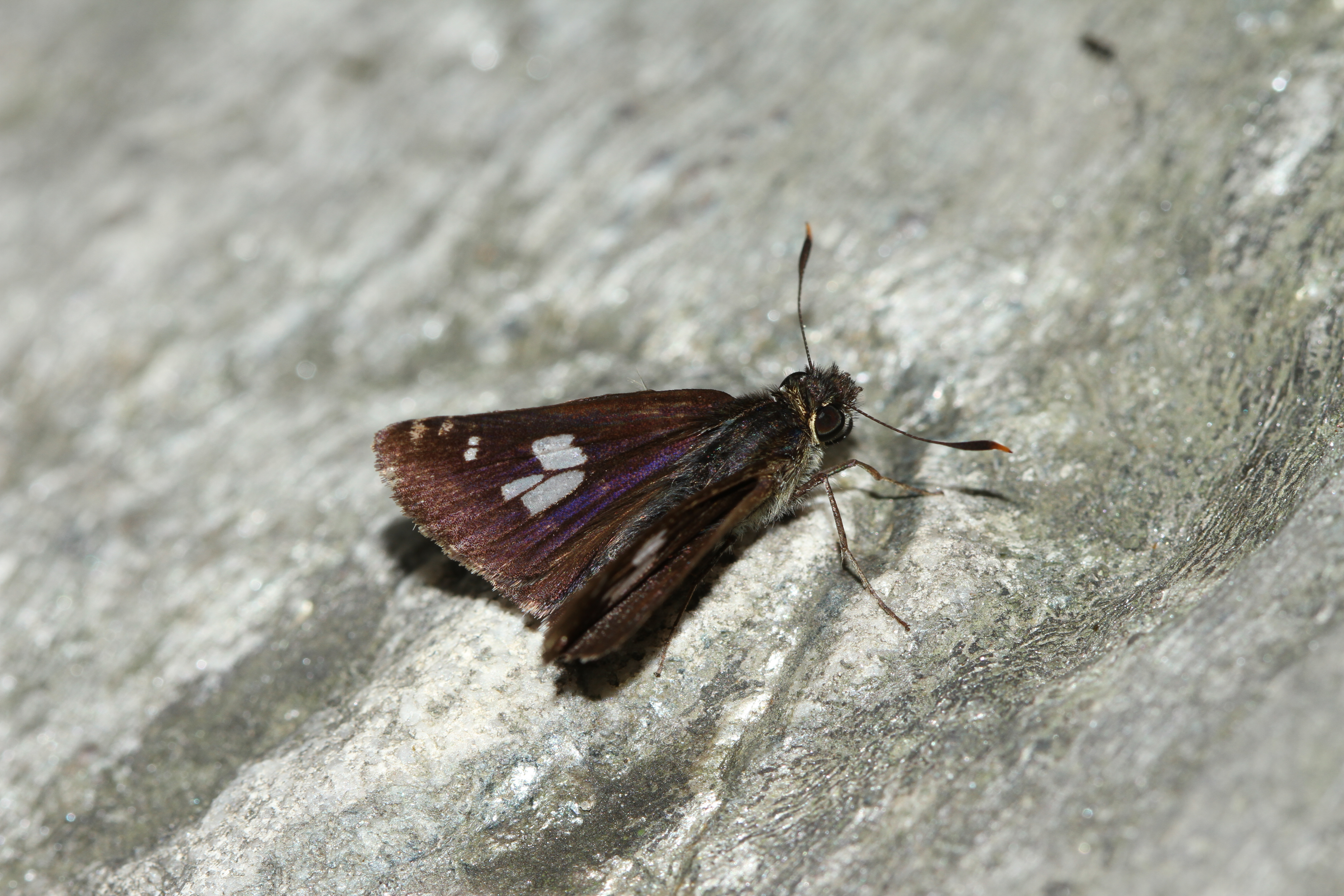

Scientific classification
- Kingdom: Animalia
- Phylum: Arthropoda
- Class: Insecta
- Order: Lepidoptera
- Family: Hesperiidae
- Genus: Thoressa
- Species: T. masuriensis

Binomial name
- Thoressa masuriensis (Moore, 1878)

= Thoressa masuriensis =

Species of butterfly

Thoressa masuriensis is a butterfly in the family Hesperiidae. It was described by Frederic Moore in 1878. It is found in the Indomalayan realm (Himalayas, Indochina).

== Subspecies ==
- Thoressa masuriensis masuriensis Himalayas, Assam.
- Thoressa masuriensis tali (Swinhoe, [1912]) Laos, Vietnam, Yunnan
