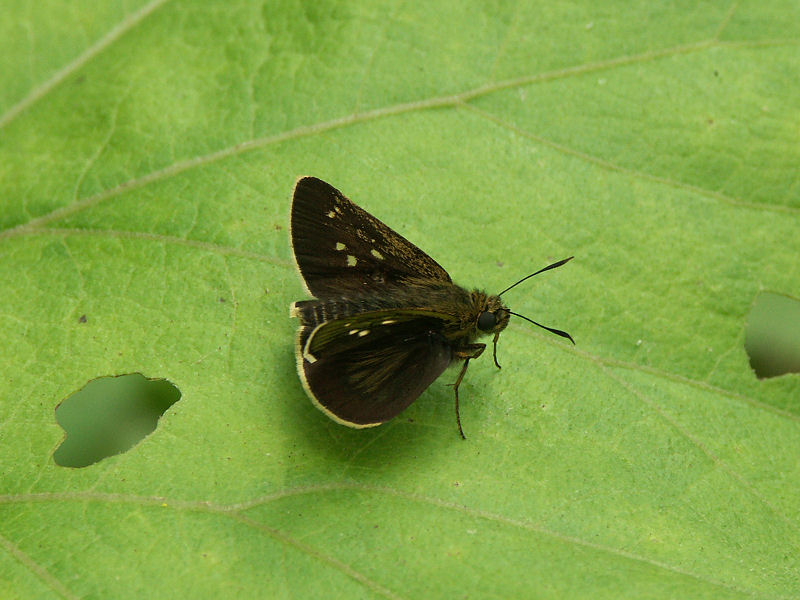
- Thoressa varia

Scientific classification
- Kingdom: Animalia
- Phylum: Arthropoda
- Clade: Pancrustacea
- Class: Insecta
- Order: Lepidoptera
- Family: Hesperiidae
- Tribe: Astictopterini
- Genus: Thoressa; C. Swinhoe, 1913

= Thoressa =

Genus of butterflies

Thoressa is a genus of skipper butterflies erected by Charles Swinhoe in 1913. They (like some other skippers) are commonly known as "aces" or "ace butterflies". The genus is endemic to Southeast Asia with many species endemic to China.

Species include:

- Thoressa aina (de Nicéville, 1889) Sikkim
- Thoressa astigmata (C. Swinhoe, 1890) southern spotted ace or unbranded ace
- Thoressa baileyi (South, 1913) China
- Thoressa blanchardii (Mabille, 1876) China
- Thoressa bivitta (Oberthür, 1886) China
- Thoressa cerata (Hewitson, 1876) Sikkim, Myanmar, Thailand, Laos
- Thoressa cuneomaculata (Murayama, 1995) China
- Thoressa decorata (Moore, 1881) decorated ace
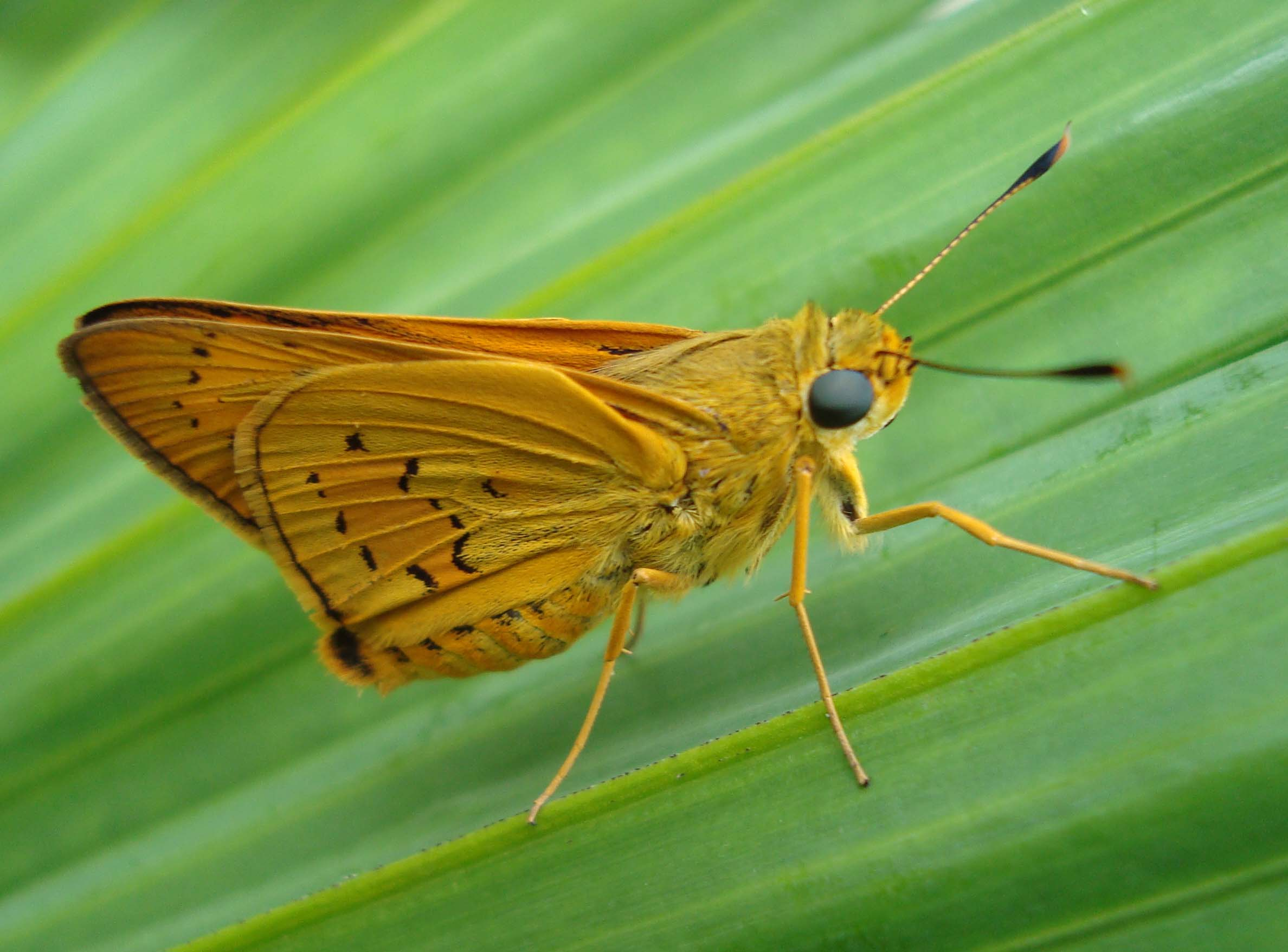
  Thoressa decorata
- Thoressa evershedi (Evans, 1910) Evershed's ace
- Thoressa fusca (Elwes, [1893]) Northeast India, Myanmar, China, Indochina
- Thoressa gupta de Nicéville, 1886 Sikkim, China
- Thoressa hishikawai (Yoshino, 2003) China
- Thoressa honorei (de Nicéville, 1887) Madras ace
- Thoressa horishama (Matsumura, 1910) Formosa
- Thoressa horishana (Matsumura) sic Formosa
- Thoressa hyrie (de Nicéville, 1891)
- Thoressa justini Inoue, 1969 Philippines
- Thoressa latris (Leech, 1894) China
- Thoressa kuata (Evans, 1940) China
- Thoressa luanchuanensis (Wang & Niu, 2002) China
- Thoressa masoni (Moore, [1879])
- Thoressa monastyrskyi Devyatkin, 1996 Vietnam
- Thoressa masuriensis (Moore, 1878)
- Thoressa nanshaona Murayama, 1995 China
- Thoressa panda (Evans, 1937) Naga Hills
- Thoressa pandita (de Nicéville, 1885)
- Thoressa pedla (Evans, 1956) China
- Thoressa serena (Evans, 1937) China
- Thoressa similissima Devyatkin, 2002 Vietnam
- Thoressa sitala (de Nicéville, 1885) Tamil ace or Sitala ace
- Thoressa submacula (Leech, 1890) China, Vietnam
- Thoressa thandaunga (Evans, 1926) Karen Hills
- Thoressa varia (Murray, 1875)
- Thoressa viridis (Huang, 2003) China
- Thoressa xiaoqingae Huang & Zhan, 2004 China
- Thoressa zinnia (Evans, 1939) China

== Biology ==
The larvae feed on Gramineae including Sasa
