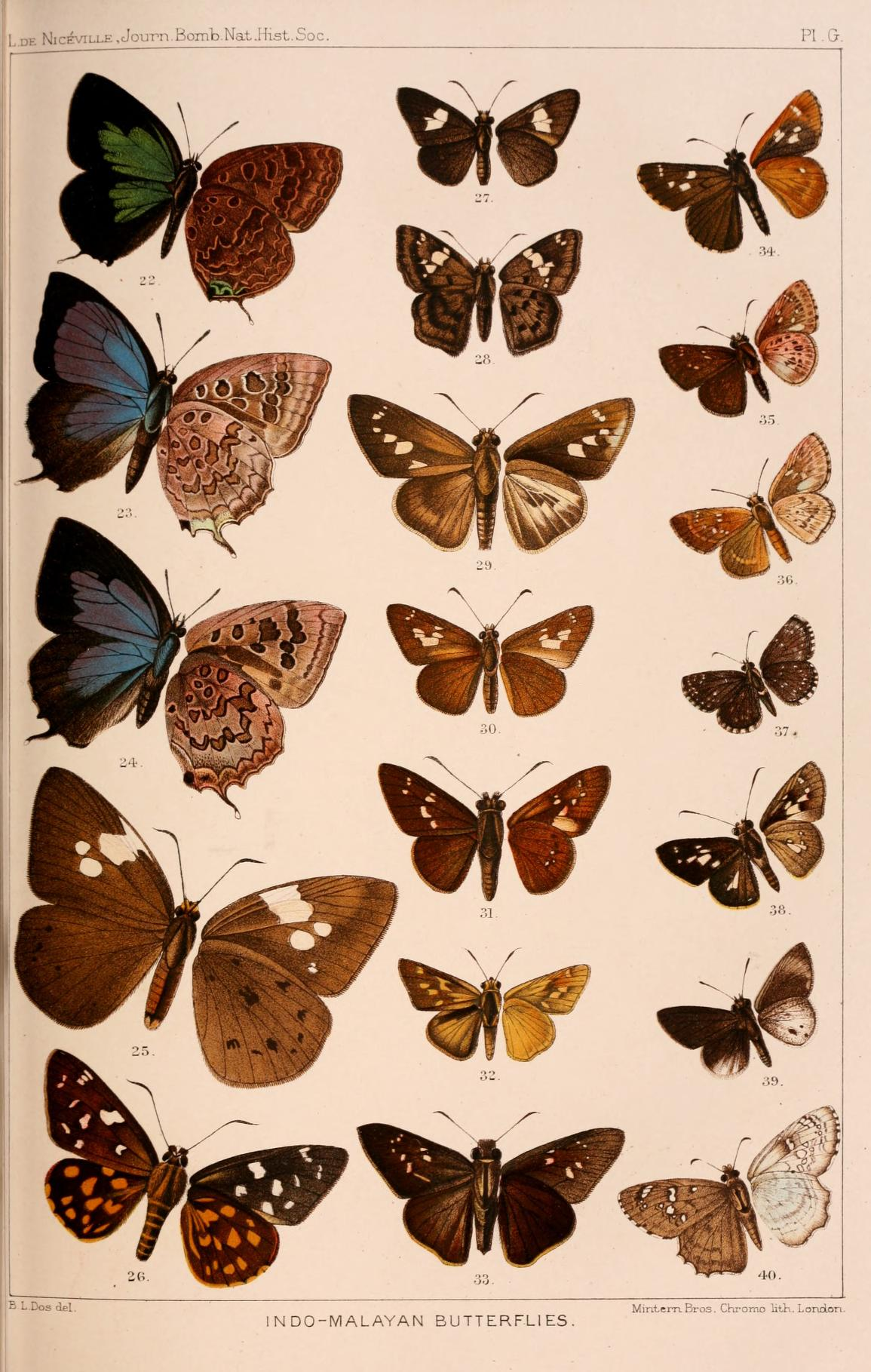
- Figure 34 from Lionel de Nicéville's 1891 "On New and Little-Known Butterflies from the Indo-Malayan Region"

Scientific classification
- Kingdom: Animalia
- Phylum: Arthropoda
- Class: Insecta
- Order: Lepidoptera
- Family: Hesperiidae
- Genus: Thoressa
- Species: T. hyrie

Binomial name
- Thoressa hyrie (de Nicéville, [1891])

Synonyms
- Halpe hyrie de Nicéville, 1891; Halpe lucasi merea Evans, 1932

= Thoressa hyrie =

Species of butterfly

Thoressa hyrie is a butterfly in the family Hesperiidae. It was described by Lionel de Nicéville in 1891. It is found in the Indomalayan realm (southeast Tibet, northern Thailand and Laos). It is easily recognisable by the double hyaline spot in the cell of the fore wing. The hyaline spots themselves are rather large, the fringes show traces of lighter irroration.
