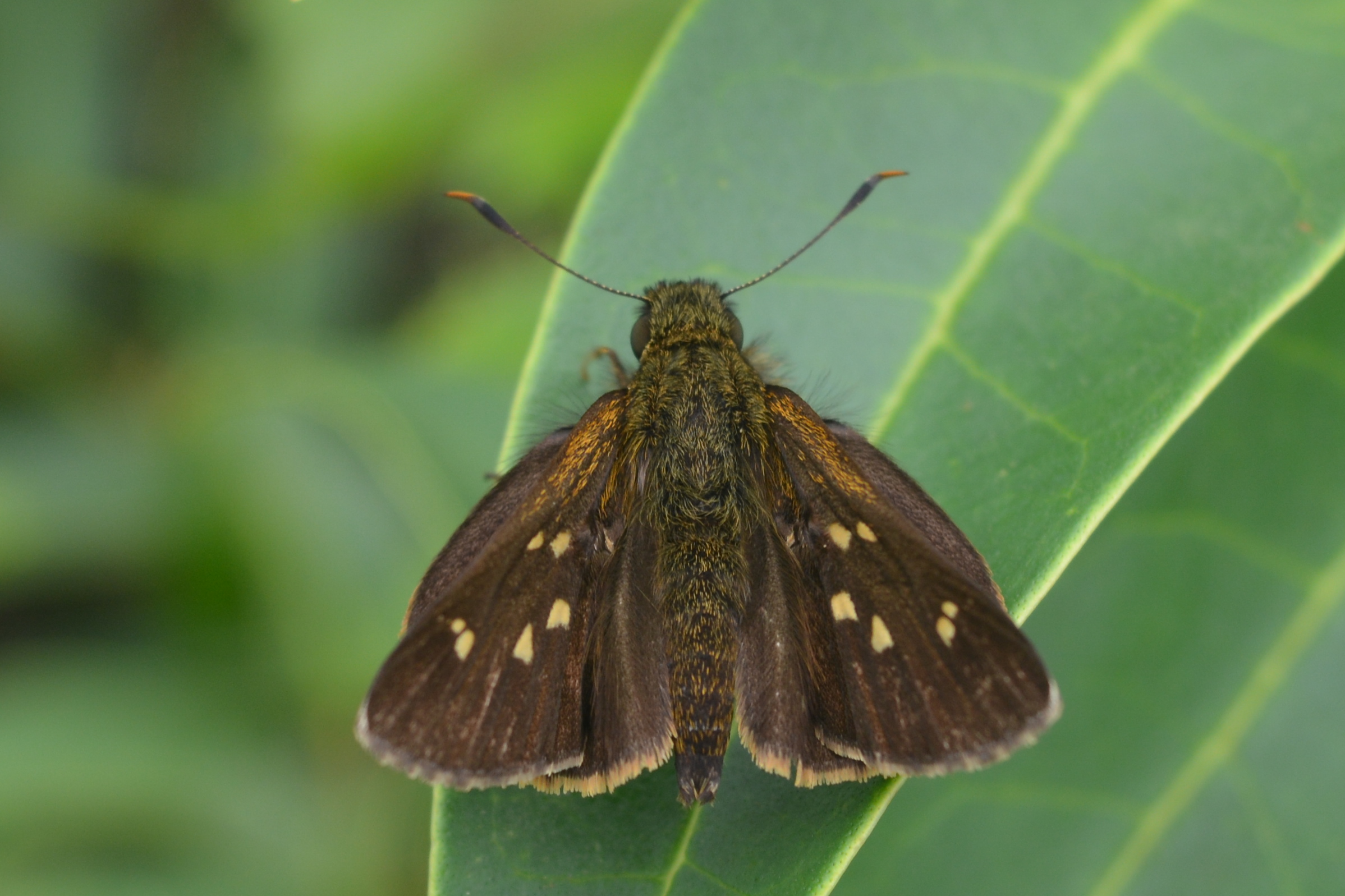
- At Paithalmala

Scientific classification
- Kingdom: Animalia
- Phylum: Arthropoda
- Class: Insecta
- Order: Lepidoptera
- Family: Hesperiidae
- Genus: Thoressa
- Species: T. sitala

Binomial name
- Thoressa sitala (de Nicéville, 1885)

= Thoressa sitala =

Tamil ace

Species of butterfly

Thoressa sitala, the Tamil ace or Sitala ace, is a butterfly belonging to the family Hesperiidae found in south India.

== Description ==
Male. Upperside blackish-brown. Forewing with two small sub-apical spots, the lower a little the larger, two small spots within the cell near its end, placed inwards obliquely, close to its upper and lower margins; and two small discal spots in the median intersspaces also inwardly obliquely, and well separated from each other, all the spots ochreous-white and semi-diaphanous. Hindwing without markings, the middle portion of the wing with some long, ochreous hairs. Cilia of both wings ochreous, with brown patches at the vein ends in the forewing only. Underside. Forewing with more than the lower half of the wing blackish-brown; the apical and costal portions broadly ferruginous-ochreous; the spots as on the upperside. Hindwing uniformly ferruginous-ochreous, two whitish dots in the median inter spaces, sometimes very obscure, two obscure ochreous spots close together between them and the anal angle, very obscure and often not traceable. Antennae black, dotted with white on the underside, the apical half of the club ferruginous, the basal half white beneath; palpi, head and body and the legs blackish-brown; palpi beneath and the pectus grey. Female like the male, the spots on the forewing larger, an extra spot on the middle of the sub-median vein, in a line with the two discal spots.

— Charles Swinhoe, Lepidoptera Indica. Vol. X

== Life cycle ==
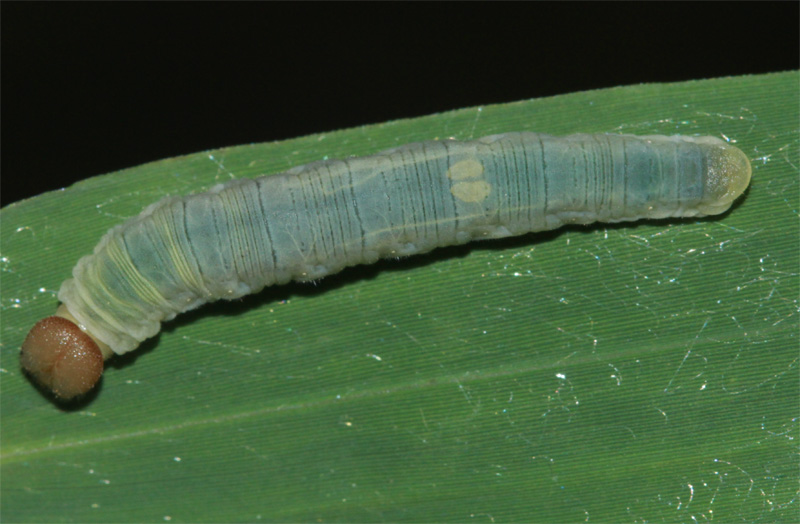
Larva

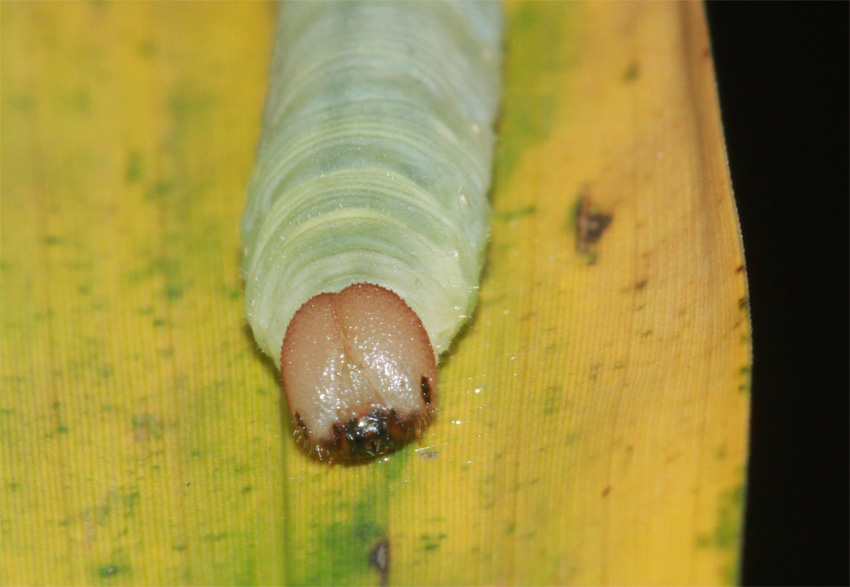
Head (larva)

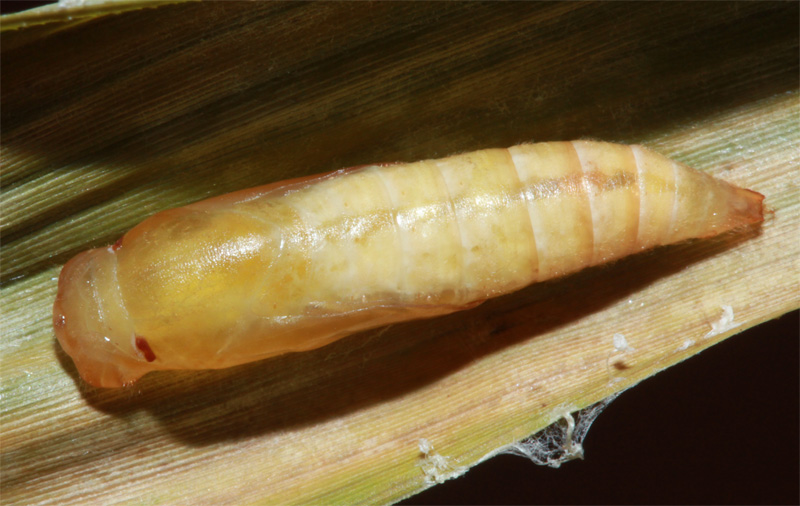
Pupa
