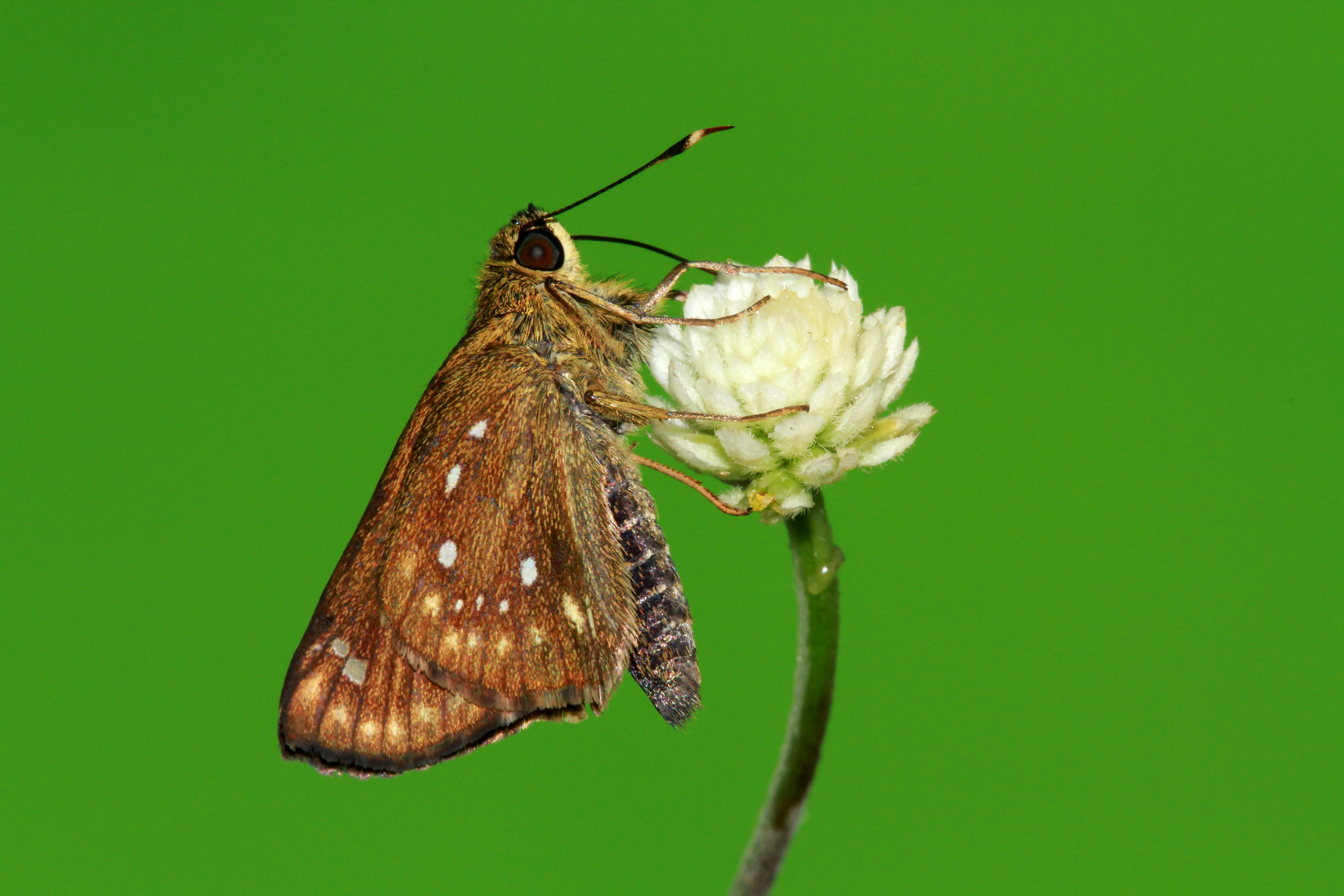

Scientific classification
- Kingdom: Animalia
- Phylum: Arthropoda
- Class: Insecta
- Order: Lepidoptera
- Family: Hesperiidae
- Genus: Thoressa
- Species: T. astigmata

Binomial name
- Thoressa astigmata (C. Swinhoe, 1890)

= Thoressa astigmata =

Southern spotted ace

Species of butterfly

Thoressa astigmata, the southern spotted ace, is a butterfly belonging to the family Hesperiidae. The species was first described by Charles Swinhoe in 1890. It is endemic to the Western Ghats of India and is found in the states of Kerala, Tamil Nadu and Karnataka.

== Description ==
Male. Upperside blackish-brown. Forewing with some dull ochreous hairs on the basal portion and seven semi-hyaline white spots; three small ones, subapical, in a curve, the uppermost spot very minute; two larger conjoined spots across the cell towards its end; two discal spots, one in each of the median interspaces, near their bases, the lower one usually double the size of the other and quadrate. Hindwing mostly covered with dull ochreous hairs, but without any markings. Cilia of forewing brown, becoming pale towards the anal angle of the hiudwing, whitish with grey marks opposite the vein ends. Underside as dark as it is on the upperside. Forewing with spots as above, and a very indistinct series of sub-marginal spots from the apex becoming quite obsolete hindwards. Hindwing with a rounded series of six or seven white dots in the upper disc and a double whitish mark above the anal angle. Antennae black spotted with white on the underside, the club white beneath, tip red, palpi, head and body blackish-brown, palpi beneath and pectus greyish, legs dull ferruginous. Female like the male.

— Charles Swinhoe, Lepidoptera Indica: Volume X.

== Life history ==
The larva has been recorded on Ochlandra talbotii and Ochlandra travancorica.

== Gallery ==
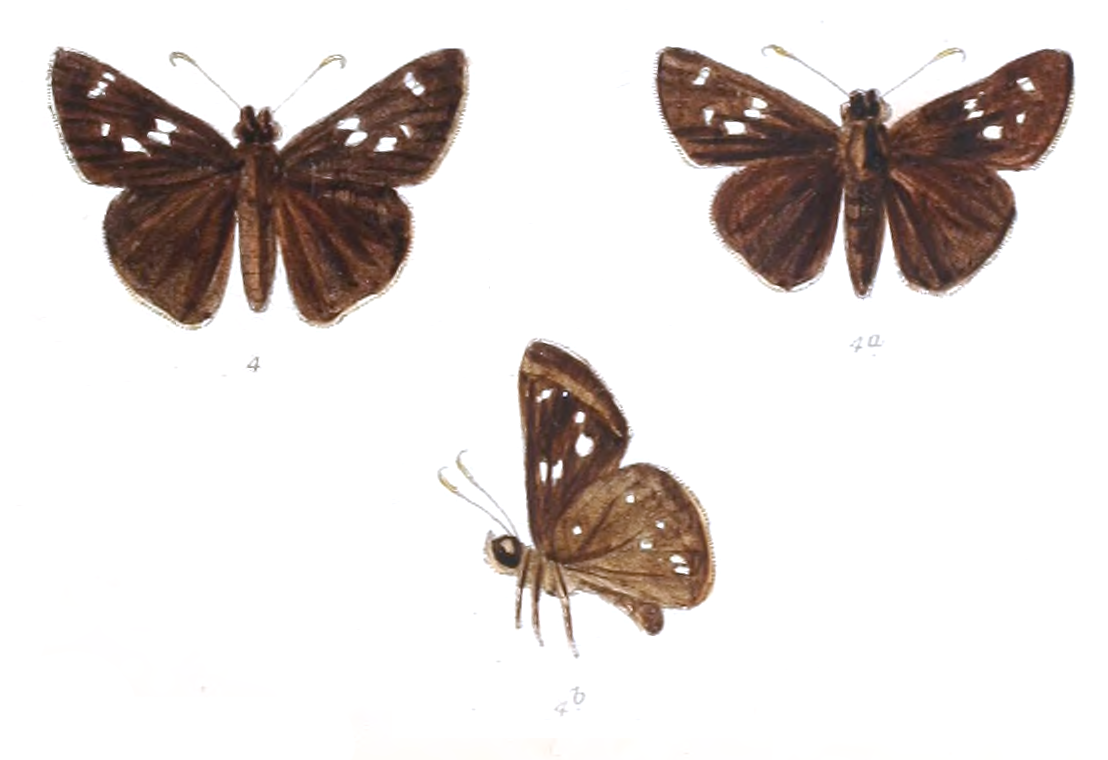
Illustration

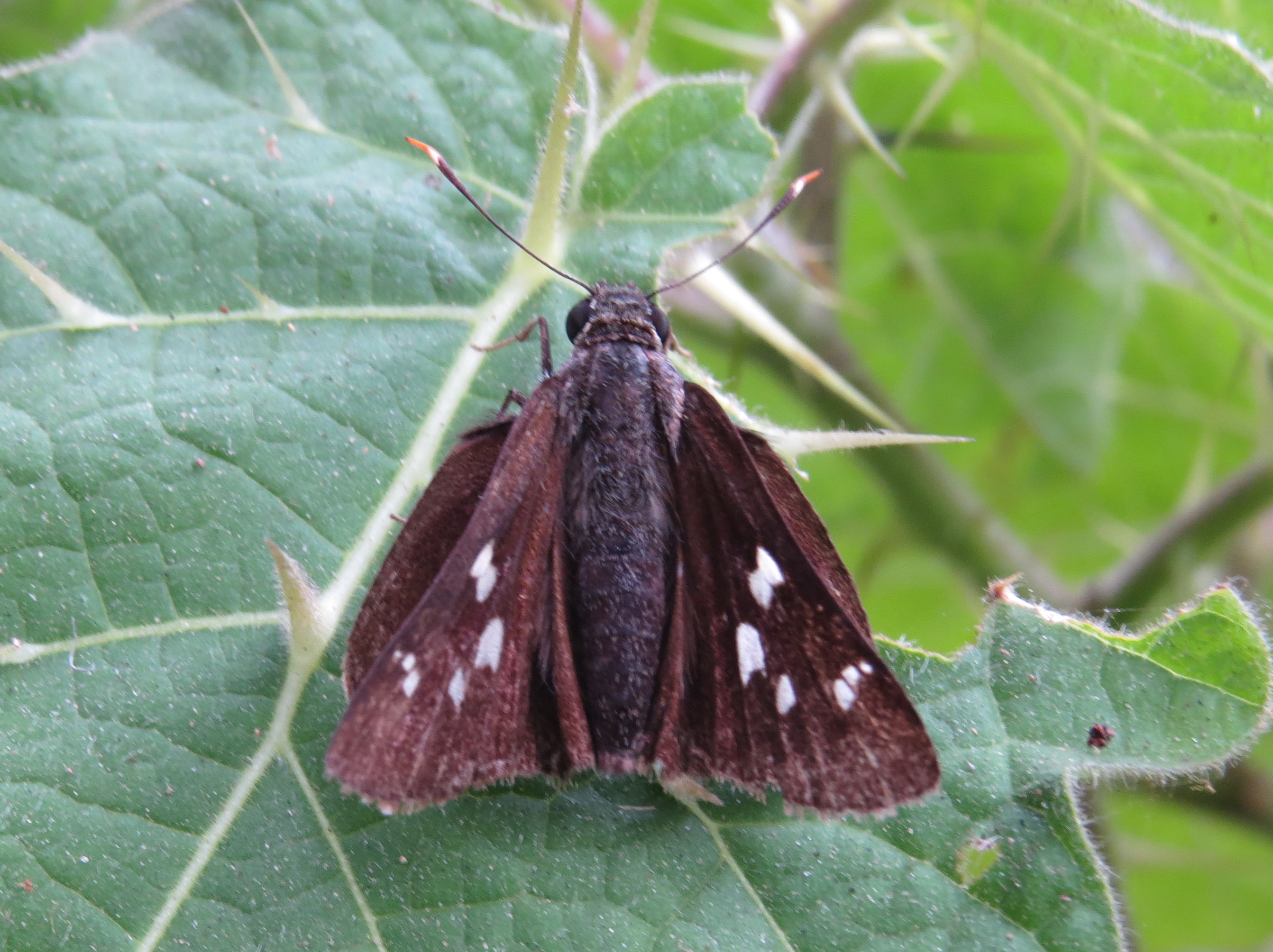
Dorsal view

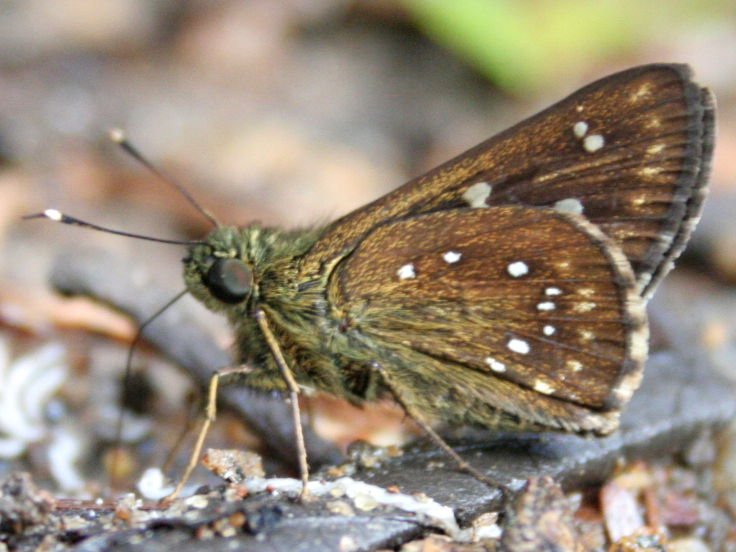
Ventral view
