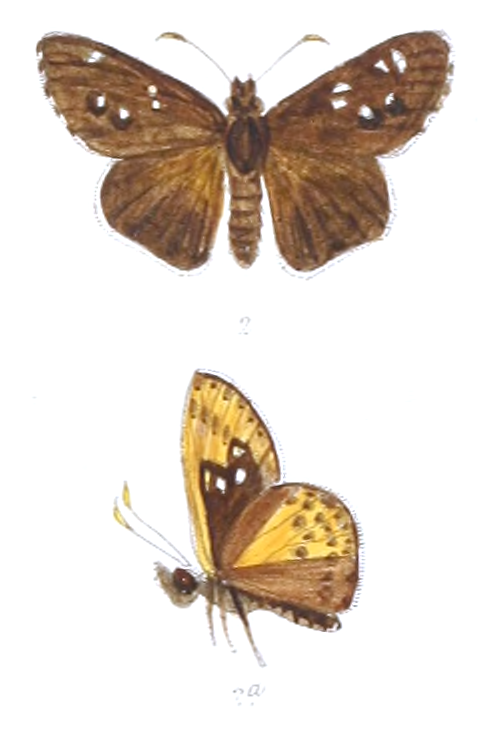

Scientific classification
- Kingdom: Animalia
- Phylum: Arthropoda
- Class: Insecta
- Order: Lepidoptera
- Family: Hesperiidae
- Genus: Thoressa
- Species: T. evershedi

Binomial name
- Thoressa evershedi (Evans, 1910)

= Thoressa evershedi =

Species of butterfly

Thoressa evershedi, the Evershed's ace, is a butterfly belonging to the family Hesperiidae.W. H. Evans described it from Palni Hills in 1910 and named it after Evershed as he was the first person to collect it.

== Description ==
Male. Upperside blackish-brown, much the same colour as in H. sitala. Forewing with the spots similarly placed, but a little smaller. Cilia grey, with brown patches. Hindwing without markings, uniformly coloured. Cilia grey, without the patches. Underside. Forewing paler brown, the costal and apical areas suffused with ochreous-red, the spots as on the upperside. Hindwing ochreous-red, the abdominal half of the wing and the costa (narrowly) suffused with brown, the outer margin with a brownish macular band and with indications of some brownish discal spots. Antennae black, ringed with white, apical half of club orange-red, the lower half of the club on the underside and part of the shaft white; palpi with black and white hairs pectus with grey hairs; head and body above and below concolorous with the wings.

— Charles Swinhoe, Lepidoptera Indica. Vol. X

== Range ==
The butterfly occurs in western Tamil Nadu, eastern Kerala. It is an occasional visitor to south-western Karnataka.
