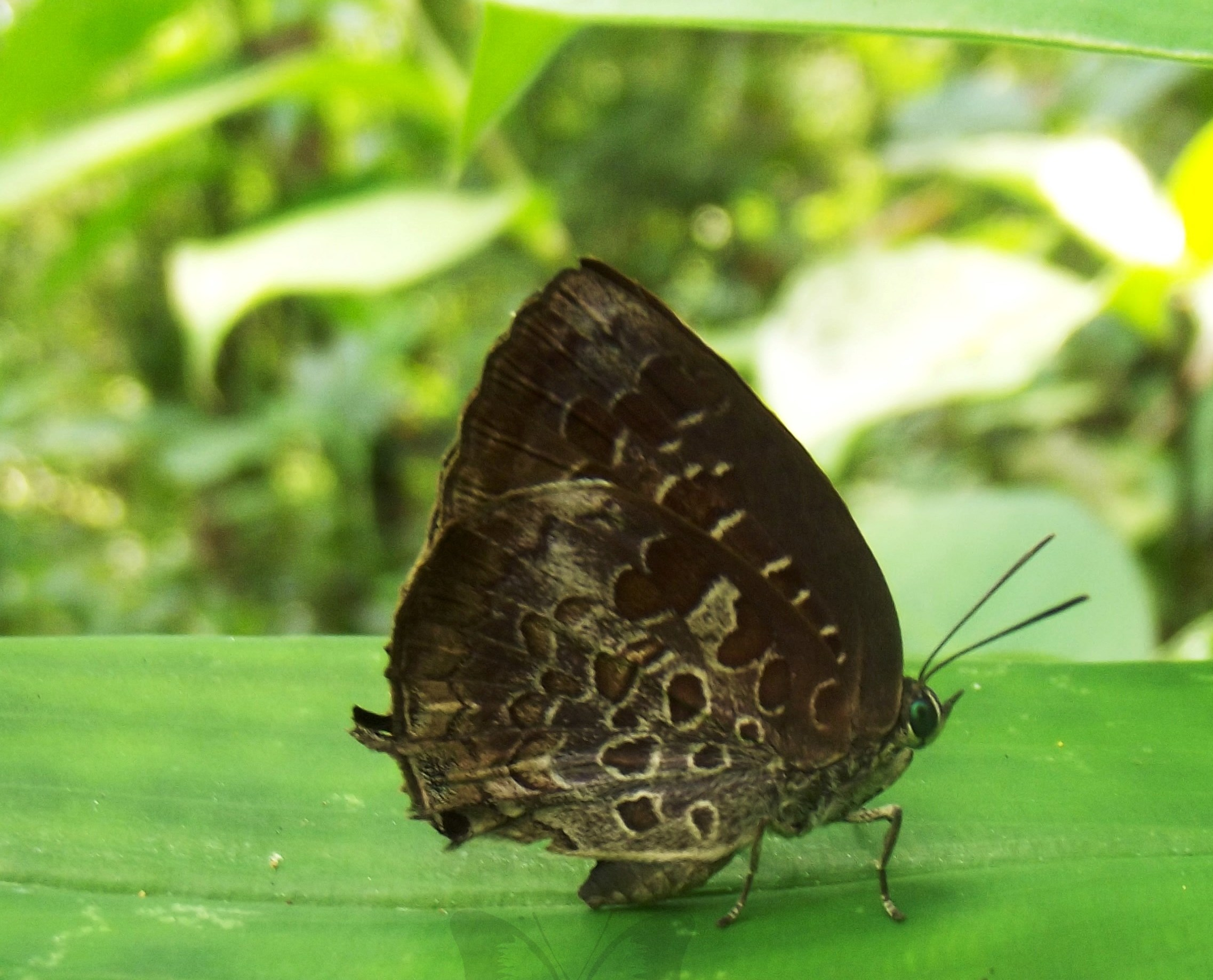

Scientific classification
- Kingdom: Animalia
- Phylum: Arthropoda
- Clade: Pancrustacea
- Class: Insecta
- Order: Lepidoptera
- Family: Lycaenidae
- Genus: Arhopala
- Species: A. bazaloides

Binomial name
- Arhopala bazaloides (Hewitson, 1878)

Synonyms
- Amblypodia bazaloides Hewitson, 1878; Narathura bazaloides (Hewitson, 1878)

= Arhopala bazaloides =

Tamil oakblue

Species of butterfly

Arhopala bazaloides, the Tamil oakblue, is a species of lycaenid or blue butterfly found in Asia. The Tamil oakblue is found India in, Myanmar, Sri Lanka and Thailand.

== Brief description ==
The light part of the hindwing beneath is so extensive that only the costal part remains darker spotted. Upper surface in both sexes of a deep purple violet with a black marginal band of about 3 mm width in the male, being still broader in the female.

Upperside : both wings deep purplish, with broad costal and posterior brown margins. In the secondaries these borders are decidedly broader than in the primaries; abdominal fold brown. Tail brown, white-tipped, the nervures on each side of which are elongated and form two very short tails. Underside: both wings brown, with the spots margined with whitish.

== Description ==
Male. Upperside deep purple, with fairly broad costal and outer marginal inconspicuous black borders, the costal band of the hindwing broadest, tail at the end of vein 2 of moderate length, very narrow, black, tipped with white. Cilia on both wings brown. Underside dark brown, with a purplish tint, markings darker brown, especially on the hindwing, indicated by their white edgings. Forewing with a fairly sized round spot inside the cell sub-basal, but well separated from the base, a slightly larger spot in the middle, and a still larger bar-shaped spot at the end which is edged with white only at its sides, a twisted white line hindwards, two bar-shaped spots outside the end of the cell, marked by their prominent white side edgings, the upper one just below the costa, the other beneath it, and almost attached to each other; a discal paler band of five conjoined bar-shaped spots from the costa, the last two a little inwards, and indistinct; a sub-marginal rather indistinct row of smaller spots, the lower portion of the wing paler than the rest. Hindwing with all the spots larger than usual, four round ones sub-basal, three of them in a line, the fourth towards the abdominal margin near the base, closely followed by a series of four larger spots in an outward curve, at equal distances apart right across the wing, the second from the top, inside the middle of the cell, oval; two conjoined spots at the end of the cell, closely followed by a discal band of eight conjoined spots descending from the costa in a slightly distorted shape to vein 4, where the band curves round to the abdominal margin, the spots forming the curve being lunular, a sub-marginal angular brown line, a series of very indistinct anteciliary lunules and some brown terminal suffusion.

Female. Upperside. Forewing brighter purple than in the male, with very broad blackish costal and outer marginal borders. Hindwing nearly all suffused with blackish, the blue colour being confined more or less to the cell area. Underside as in

the male. Antennae black, tipped with orange; palpi black above, grey below; head and body blackish-brown above, white beneath.

— Charles Swinhoe, Lepidoptera Indica. Vol. VIII

The adults are small, often brilliantly coloured with electric blues, reds, and oranges. Females lay single, sea urchin shaped eggs on host leaves or flower buds; the resulting caterpillars are typically slug shaped. In many species, caterpillars depend on ants for protection, so caterpillars produce sugary secretions that are collected by the ants, in a symbiotic relationship. Most individuals overwinter in either the egg or pupal stage.

The species was once considered as extinct from Sri Lanka, but rediscovered in 2014 from wet zone lowland forests of Sinharaja and Kanneliya.
