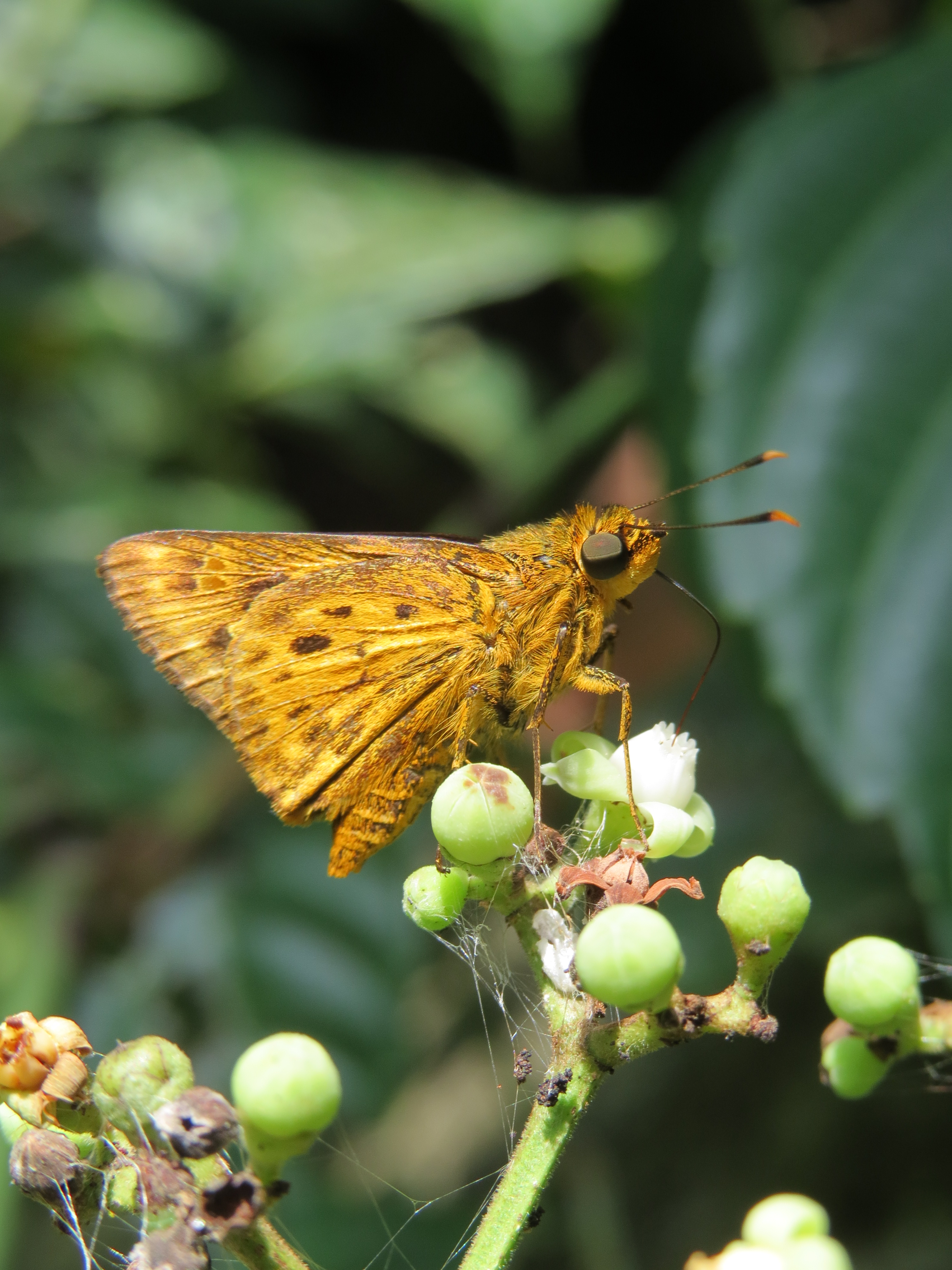

Scientific classification
- Kingdom: Animalia
- Phylum: Arthropoda
- Class: Insecta
- Order: Lepidoptera
- Family: Hesperiidae
- Genus: Thoressa
- Species: T. honorei

Binomial name
- Thoressa honorei (de Nicéville, 1887)

Synonyms
- Halpe honorei

= Thoressa honorei =

Madras ace

Species of butterfly

Thoressa honorei, commonly known as the Madras ace, is a skipper butterfly belonging to the family Hesperiidae found in south India.

== Description ==
Female. Upperside; both wings fuscous. Forewing with the base clothed with yellow hair-like scales, more or less forming streaks between the veins; a large rhomboidal spot at the outer end of the discoidal cell, two elongated ones, the upper twice the size of the lower, in the median interspaces, two or three subapical conjugated increasing spots, all semitransparent glistening yellow. Hindwing with all but the costal margin as far as the second subcostal nervule, and the outer margin somewhat narrowly, and the abdominal margin, clothed with long yellow setae; a large discal yellow patch beyond the cell divided by the dark nervules and enclosing a blackish dot in the second median interspace. Underside: forewing black all except the costal margin increasingly, the apex widely and the outer margin decreasingly, which are yellowish-ochreous; the semi-transparent spots as above, with two additional somewhat diffused opaque spots placed one above the other near the. middle of the submedian interspace, which appear in a somewhat constricted form on the upperside of one specimen. Hindwing yellowish-ochreous throughout; a black spot at the end of the cell and about six between the veins outside the cell; some obscure submarginal blackish spots; the abdominal margin and a streak in the submedian interspace black.

— Edward Yerbury Watson

Wing expanse of 1.5 inches (38 mm).

The markings of this species remind one at once of those of Plastingia noemi mihi; but there is only one spot in the cell of the forewing, and the yellow in the hindwing is larger in the species now described. Described from somewhat worn specimens collected by Father D. Honore, S. J., in the Pulni Hills of S. India.

— Lionel de Nicéville

Life cycle

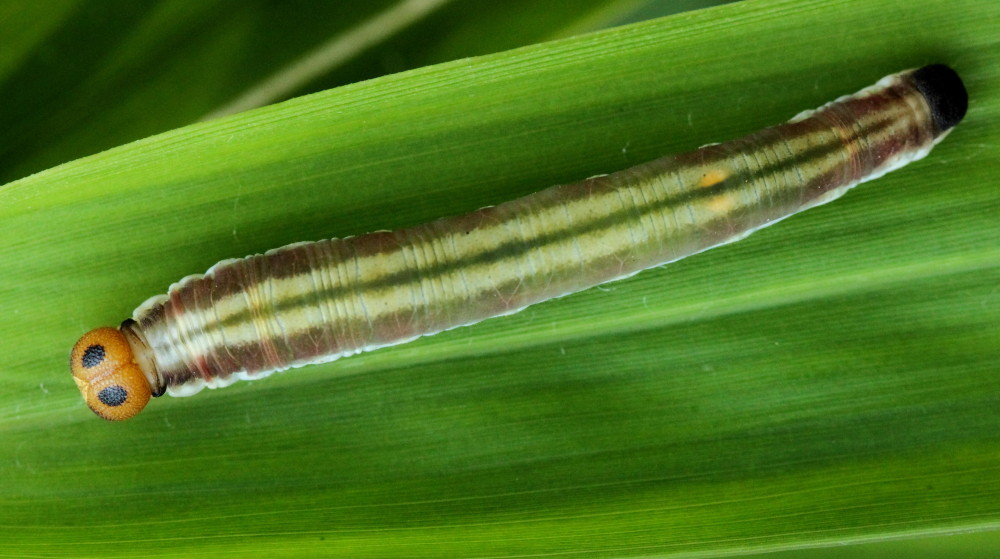
Larva (dorsal view)

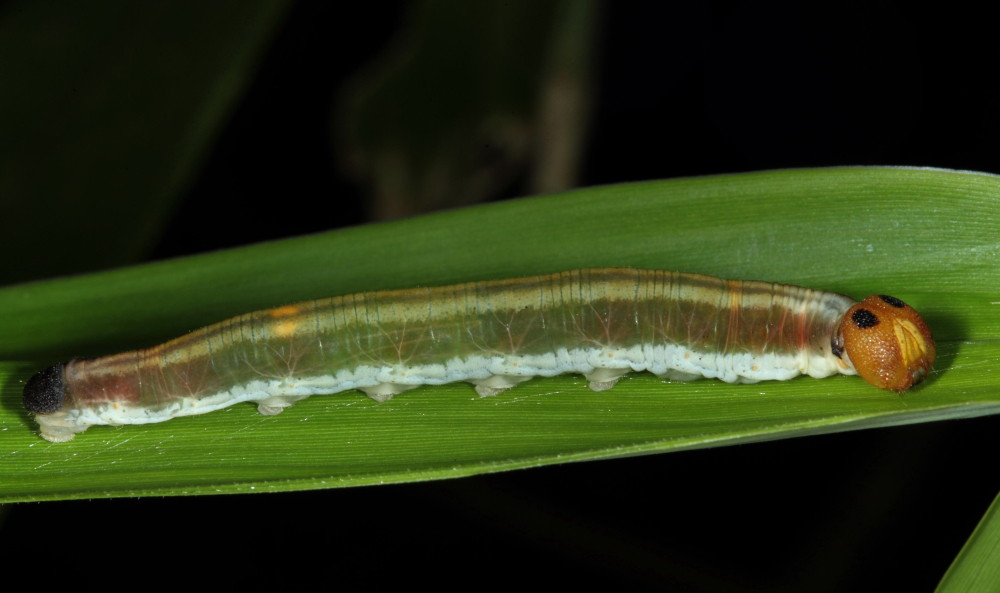
Larva (lateral view)

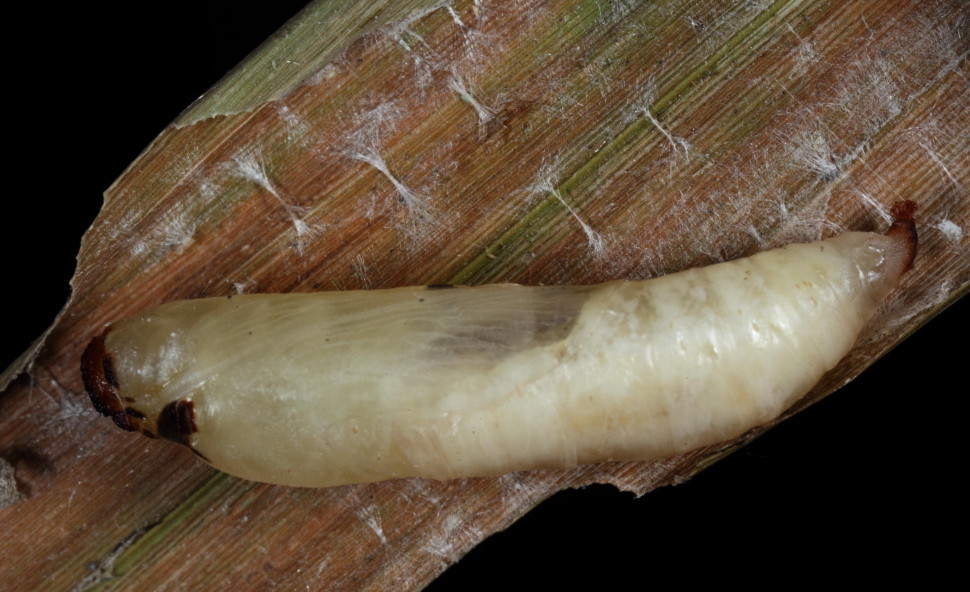
Chrysalis

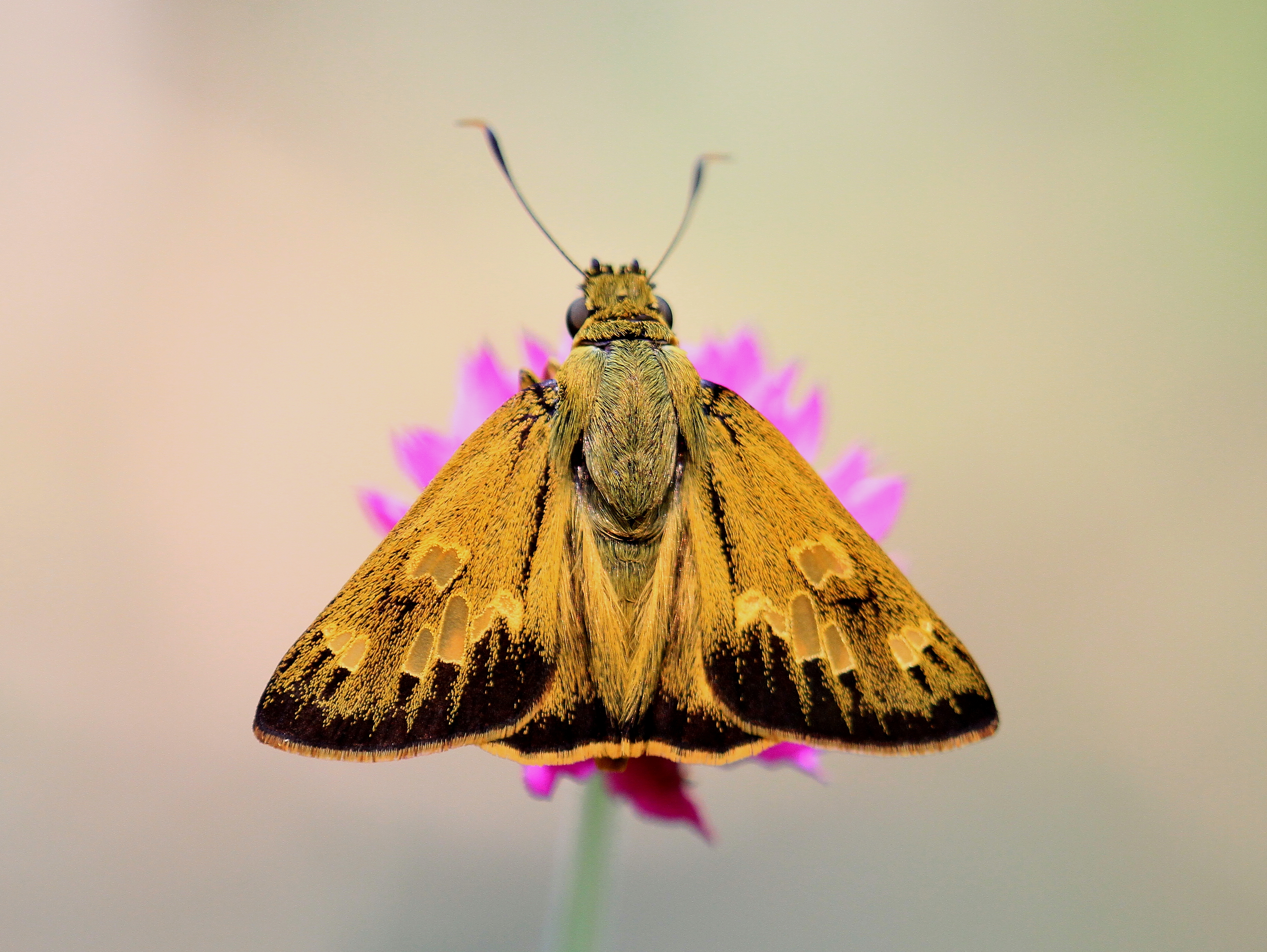
(dorsal view)

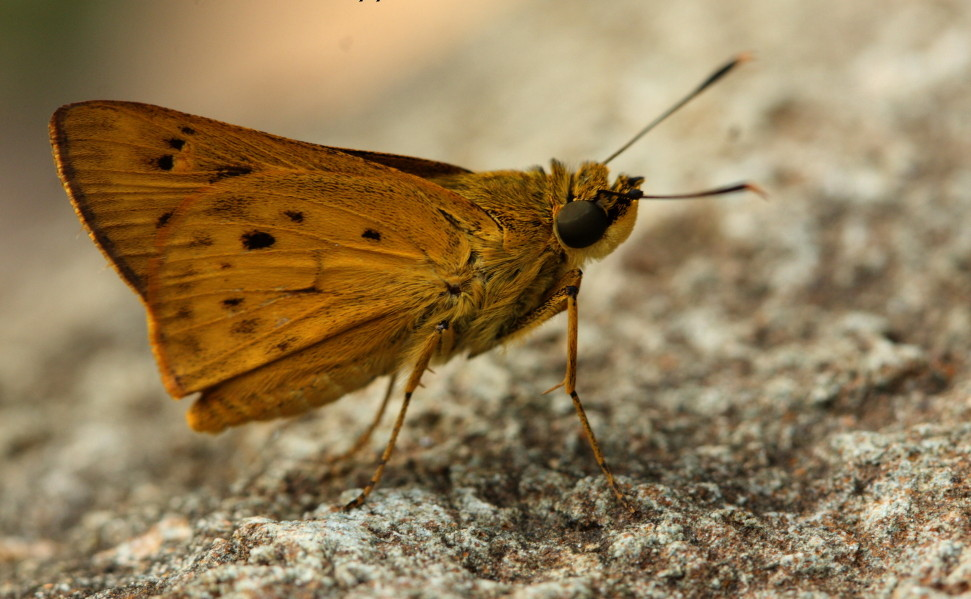
Imago (lateral view)
