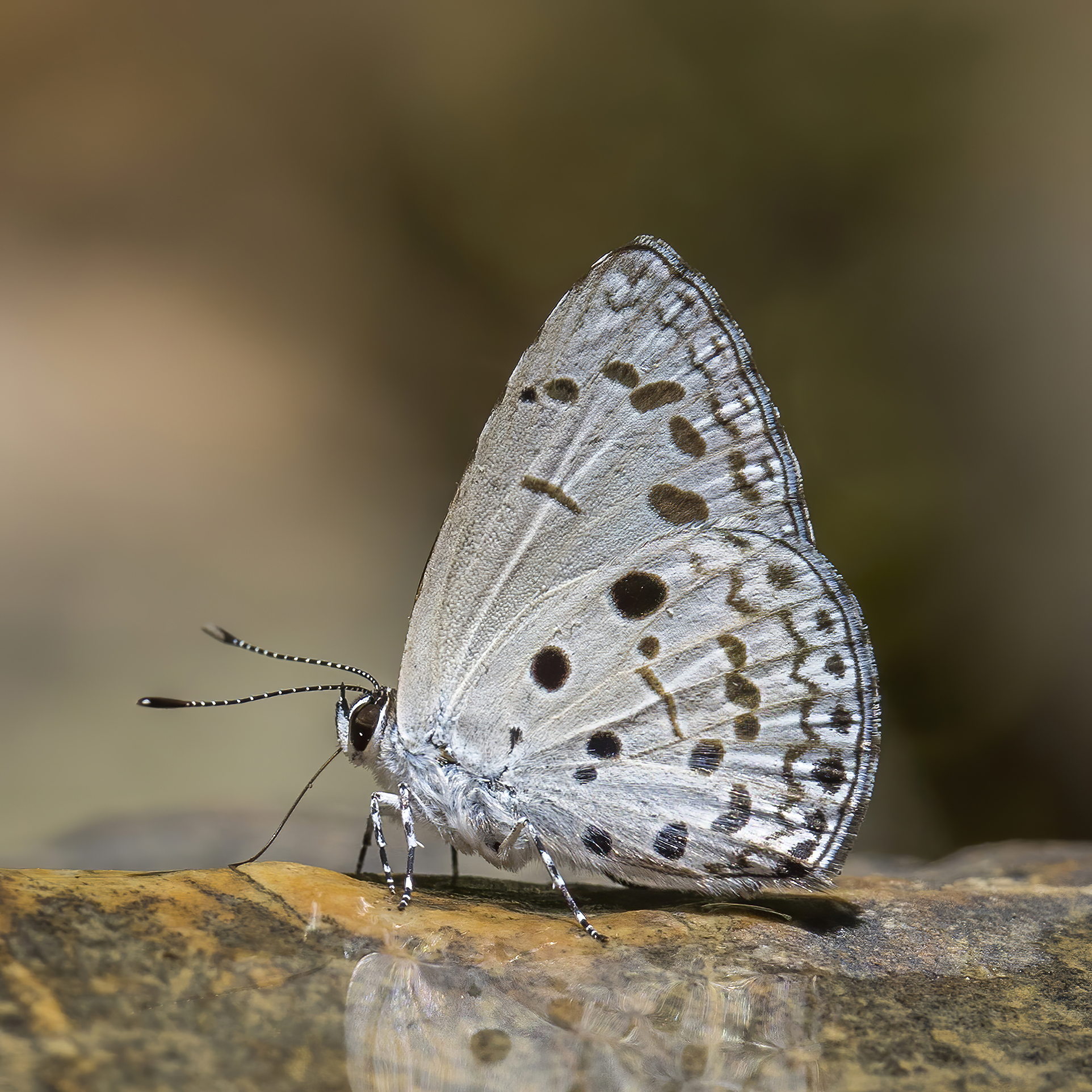
- Acytolepis puspa gisca, Thailand

Scientific classification
- Kingdom: Animalia
- Phylum: Arthropoda
- Class: Insecta
- Order: Lepidoptera
- Family: Lycaenidae
- Genus: Acytolepis
- Species: A. puspa

Binomial name
- Acytolepis puspa (Horsfield, 1828)

Synonyms
- Lycaenopsis puspa

= Acytolepis puspa =

Common hedge blue

Species of butterfly

Acytolepis puspa, the common hedge blue, is a small butterfly found in Cambodia, India, Pakistan, Myanmar, Thailand, Malaysia, Singapur, Yunnan, Taiwan, Sri Lanka, Philippines, Borneo and New Guinea that belongs to the lycaenids or blues family. The species was first described by Thomas Horsfield in 1828.

== Taxonomy ==
The butterfly was earlier known as Lycaenopsis puspa (Toxopeus). It is the type species for the genus Acytolepis.

== Description ==
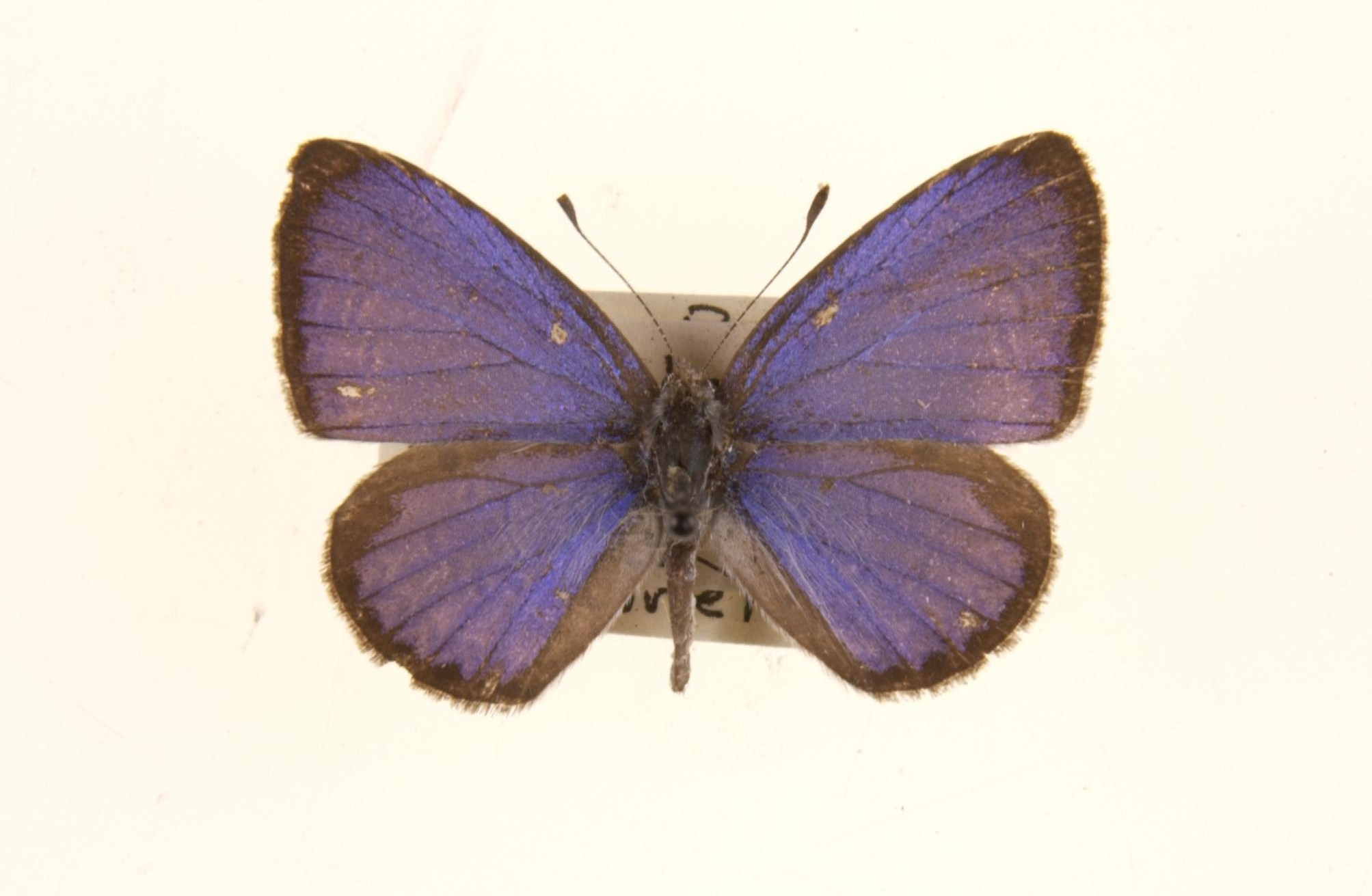
Male from Malaya

Wet-season brood. male. Upperside: violaceous blue, with brilliant iridescent tints in certain lights. Forewing: the costa, apex and termen bordered with black, this edging narrows from base to the middle of the costa, then broadens greatly at apex, where it occupies the apical fourth of the wing, and is again narrowed below vein 4, whence it is continued as an even band to the tornus; on the disc beyond the apex of the cell the ground colour is sensibly paler, and the dark markings of the cell are faintly visible by transparency from below. Hindwing: the costa very broadly, the termen much more narrowly black; the black bordering on the latter consists of a series of rounded coalescent spots, which on the inner side are margined by faint dark lunules; these are formed not by actual scaling but by the dark markings of the underside which show through more or less clearly.

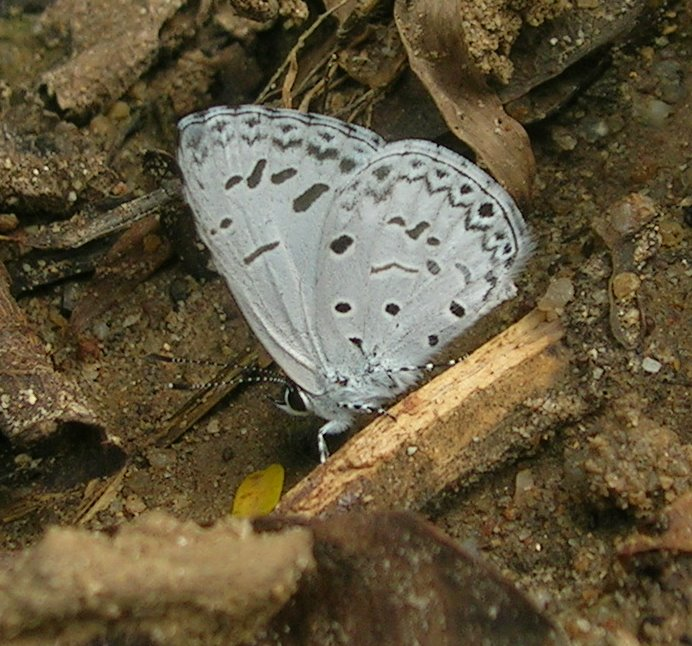
From the Eastern Ghats, India

Underside: slightly bluish white; the markings, some black, some dusky, but all large and distinct. Forewing: a short bar on the discocellulars, an anteriorly inwardly curved, transverse, discal series of seven, more or less elongate spots, of which the spot in interspace 2 is vertical and sinuous, the next above it irregularly oval and obliquely placed, the next smaller and almost round, the fourth placed almost longitudinally, forms a short bar, and the apical three decrease in size to the costa; beyond these is an inner subterminal, transverse, lunular line, an outer subterminal series of transverse spots and a very slender anteciliary line. Hindwing: two basal and three subbasal spots in vertical order; a line on the discocellulars; a spot above it at base of interspace 6; a much larger spot above that in interspace 7; a lower discal irregular transverse series of five spots, followed by terminal markings similar to those on the forewing, except that the spots in the subterminal row are rounded, not transverse. Cilia of both forewings and hindwings white alternated with dusky black at the apices of the veins. Antennae, head, thorax and abdomen dusky black, the antennae ringed with white; beneath: the palpi, thorax and abdomen white.

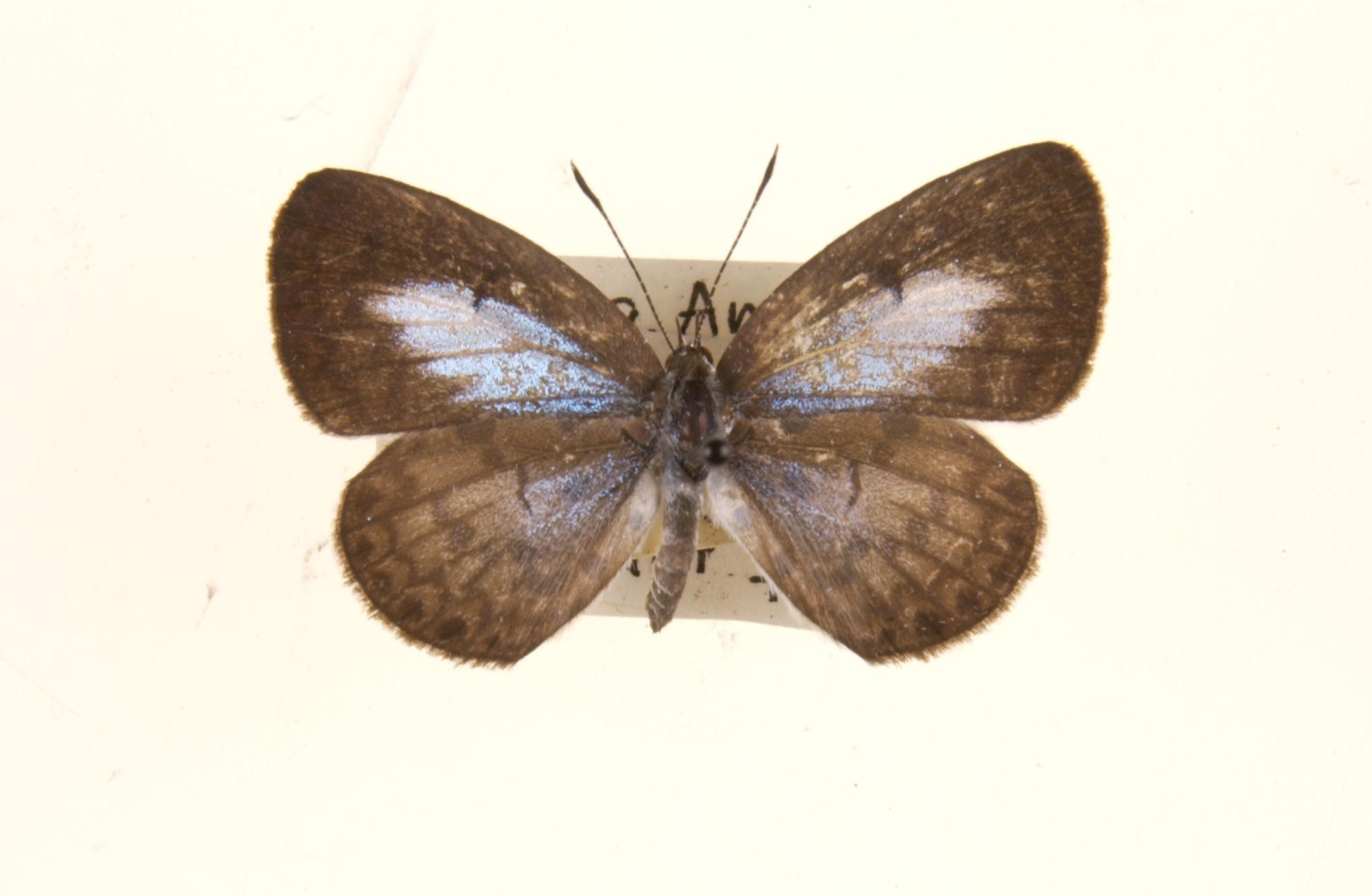
Female from Malaya

Female: upperside: white, the bases of the wings and in some specimens the hindwing posteriorly shot with iridescent blue. Forewing: costa, apex and termen broadly black; the discocellulars marked with a very short, fine black line that extends down from the black on the costal margin. Hindwing: costa and apex broadly black; termen below vein 6 with a regular subterminal series of black spots in the interspaces, enclosed within an inner lunular and an outer straight slender anteciliary black line; the veins, except vein 5 in the middle, slenderly black. Cilia of both forewings and hindwings white. Underside: ground colour and markings similar to those of the male. Antennae, head, thorax and abdomen as in the male.

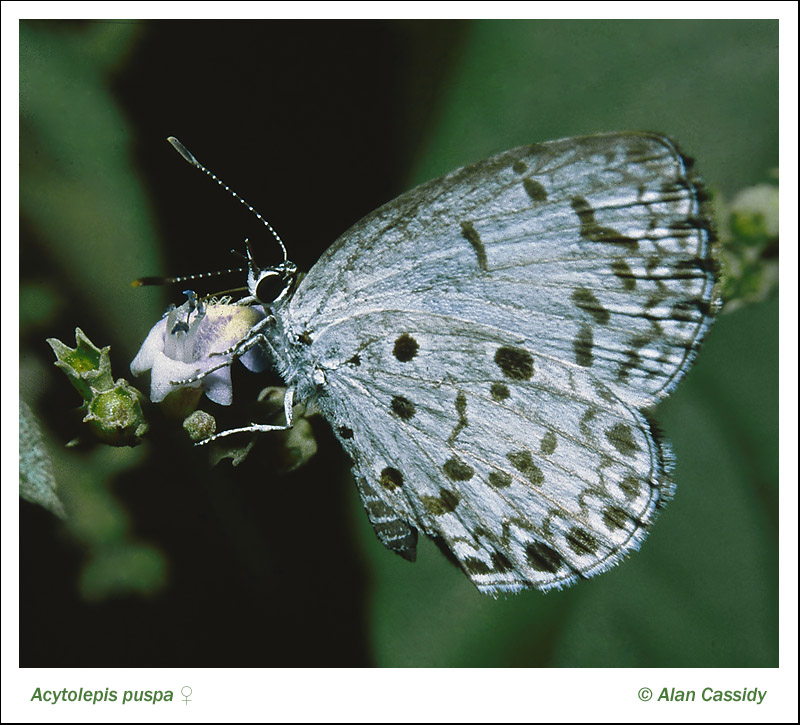
Female from Brunei

Dry-season brood. Differs very slightly from the wet-season brood. In the male there is a small patch of white on the upperside of the forewing beyond the cell and on the upperside of the hindwing on the anterior portion of the disc; the extent of this patch varies on the forewing from a mere touch of white just beyond the cell to a large discal area of white which is diffuse with ill-defined margins. In the female the blue iridescence at the base of the wings on the upperside is in some specimens considerably restricted, in others entirely absent. On the underside in both sexes the ground colour is paler and in form and position the markings are much less prominent, though entirely like those of the wet-season brood.

== Range ==
The butterfly occurs in Peninsular India, Himalayas, Assam, Andamans, Nicobars, Sri Lanka, Cambodia, Myanmar, Taiwan, Philippines, Borneo, Sulawesi and New Guinea.

== Subspecies ==
At least twenty (see Wikispecies) differing mainly in the extent of the black wing borders and spots and the shade of blue (verging to white).

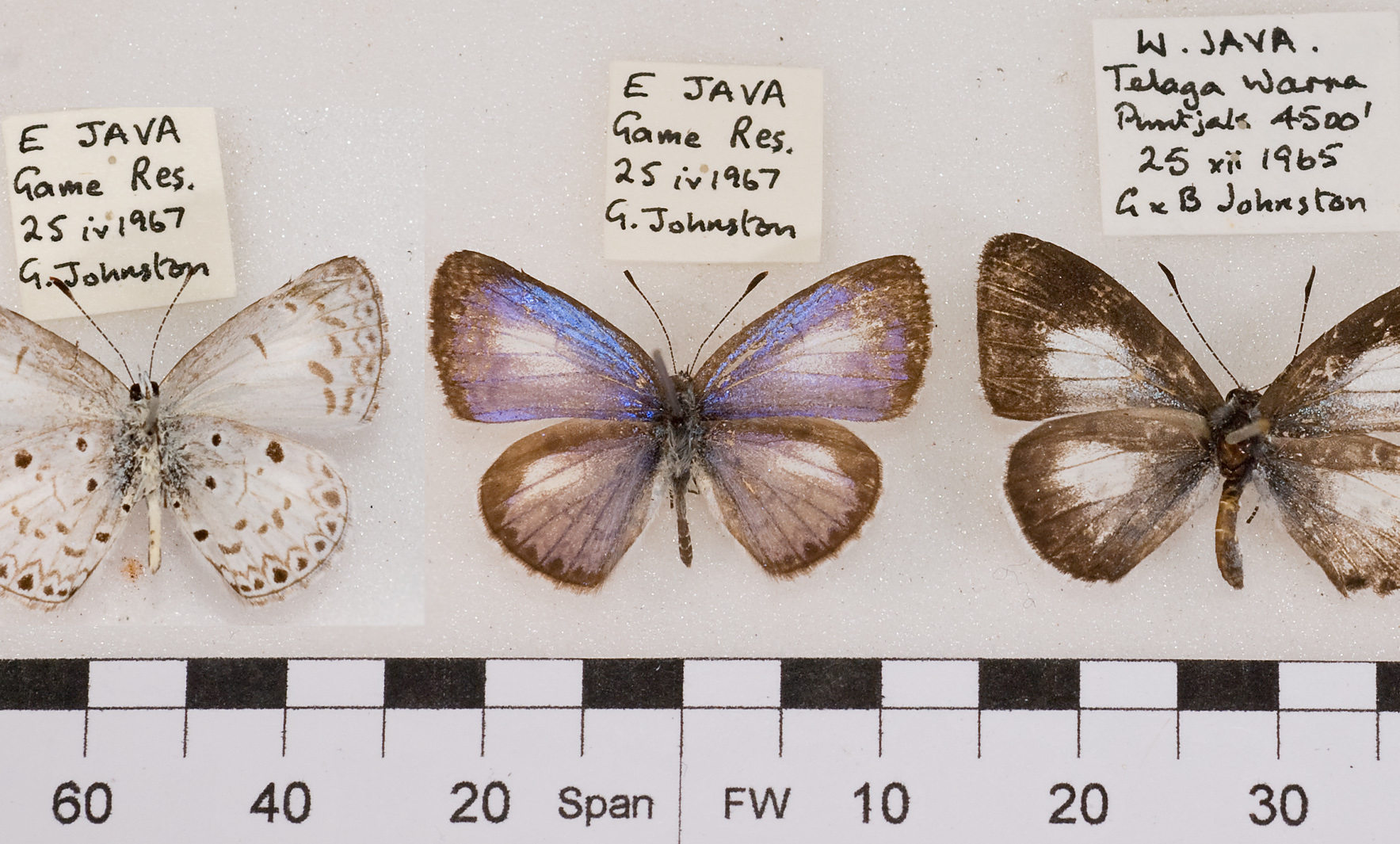
Acytolepis puspa puspa

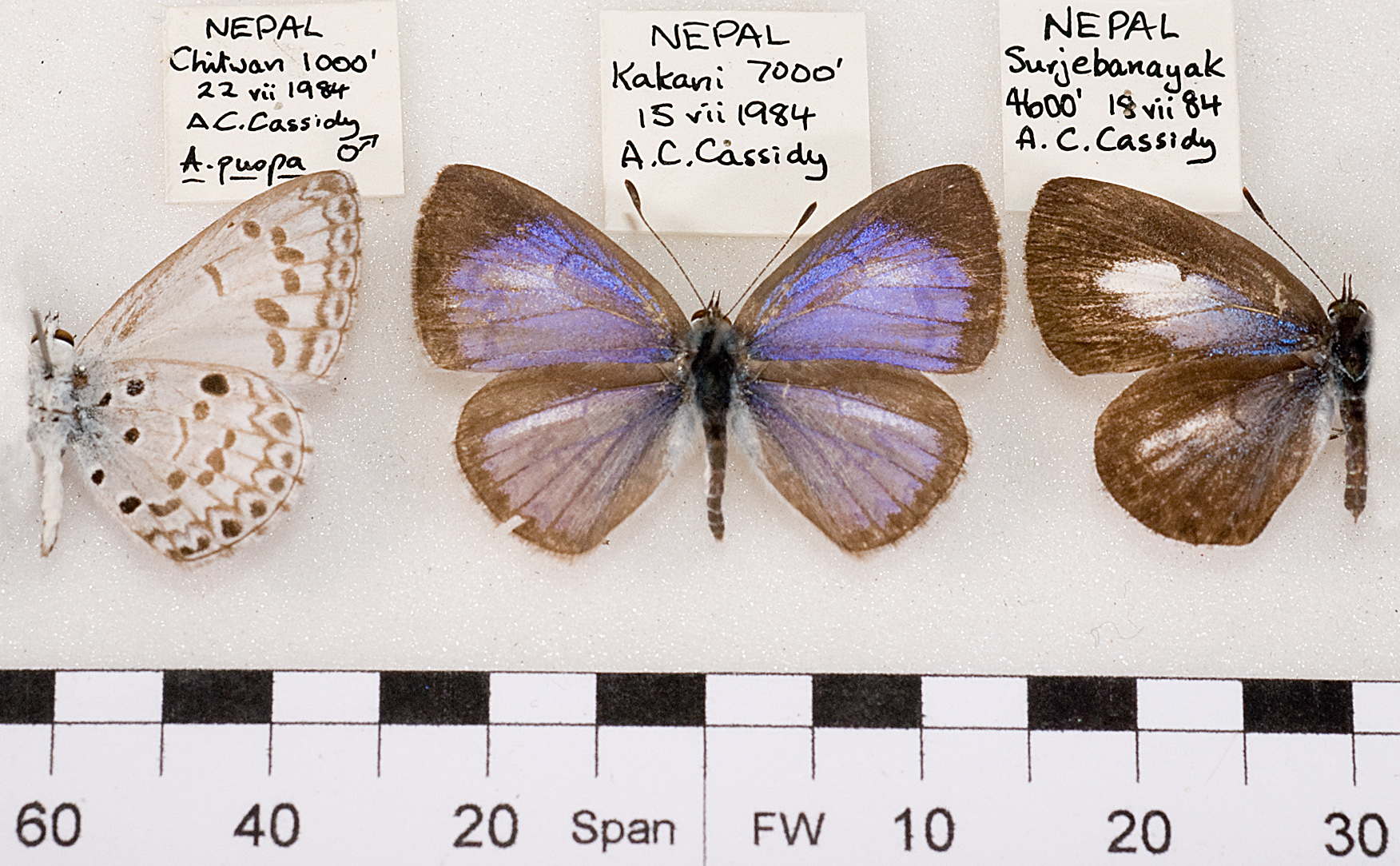
Acytolepis puspa gisca (Fruhstorfer, 1910).

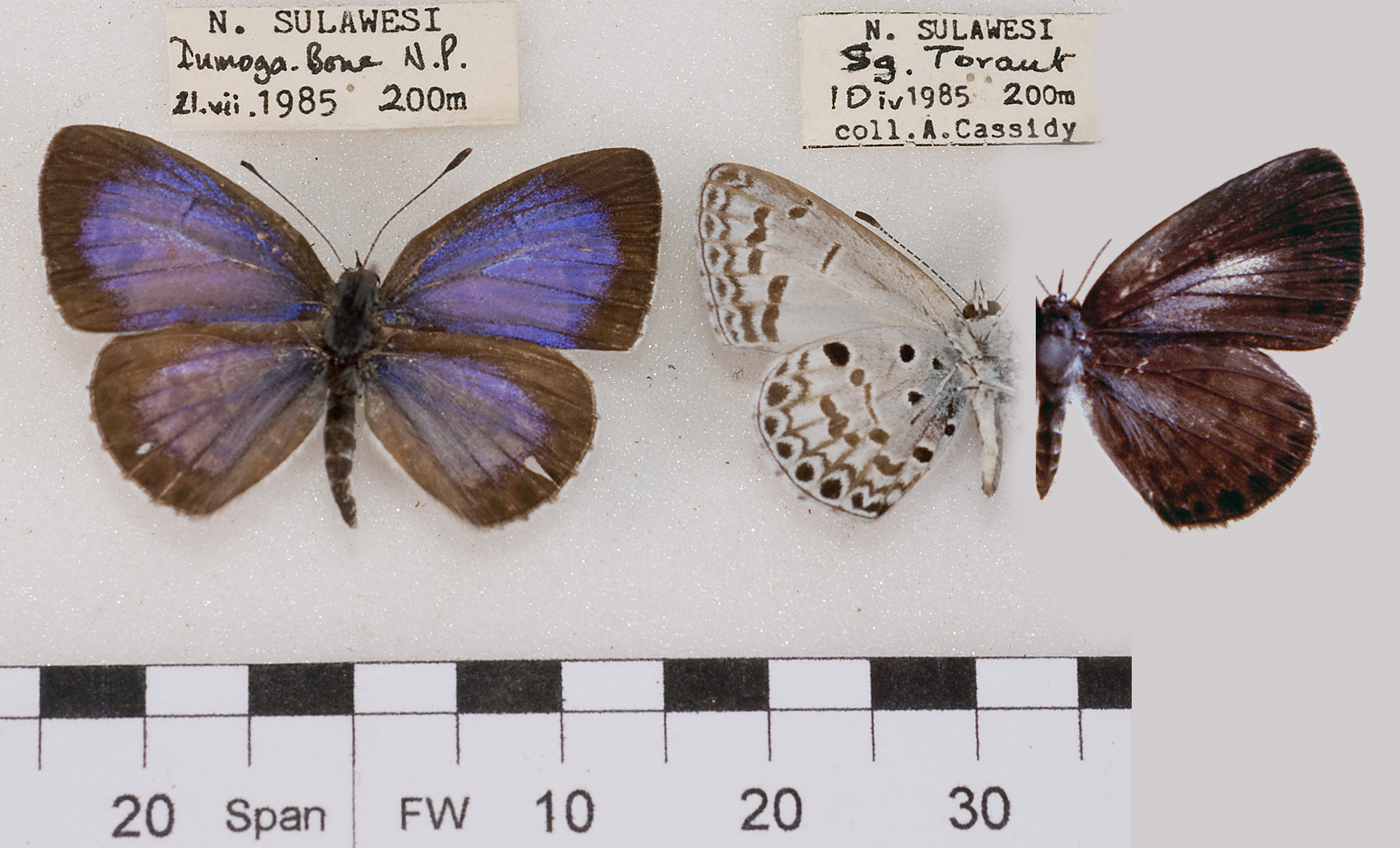
Acytolepis puspa kuehni (Rober, 1886).

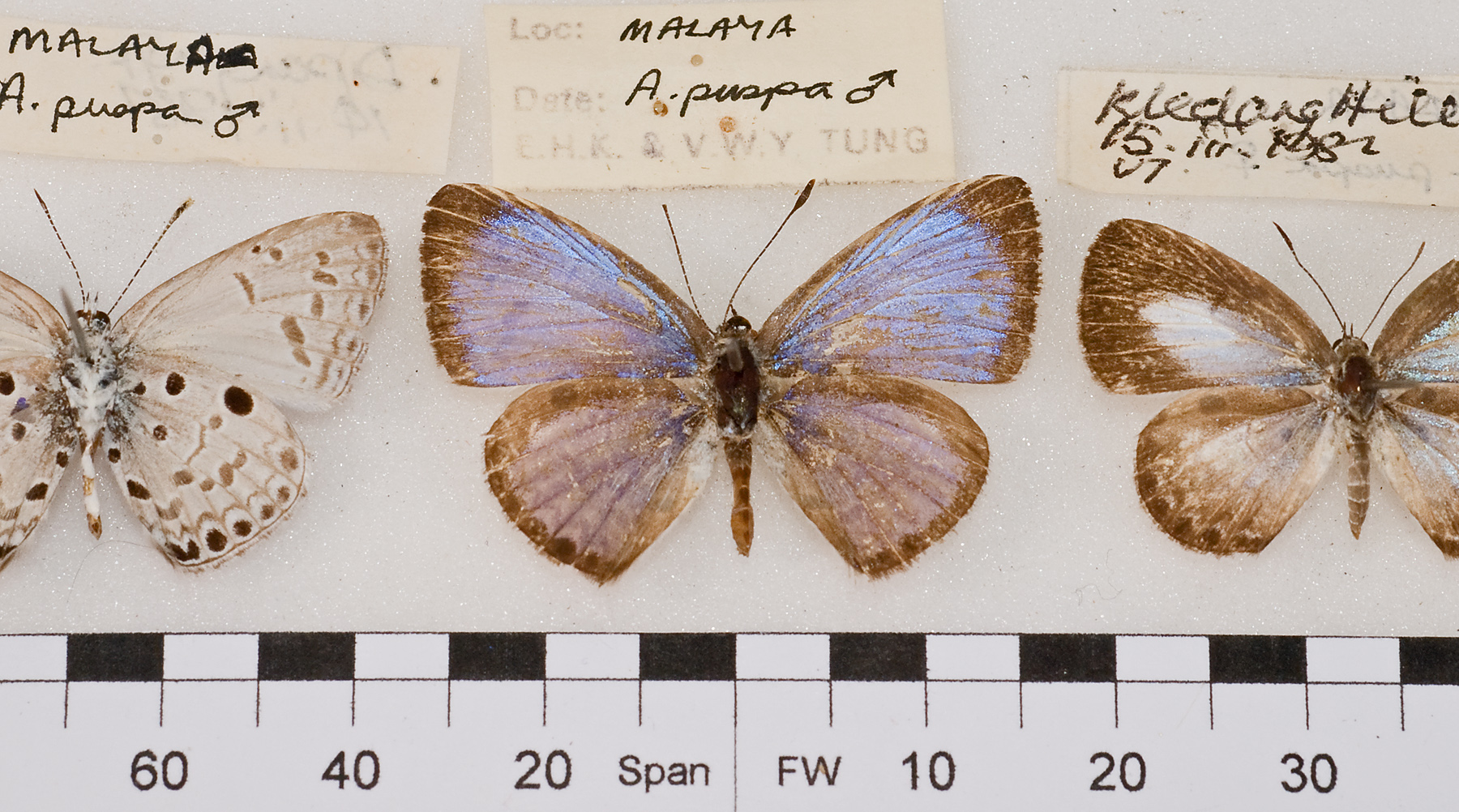
Acytolepis puspa lambi (Distant, 1882).

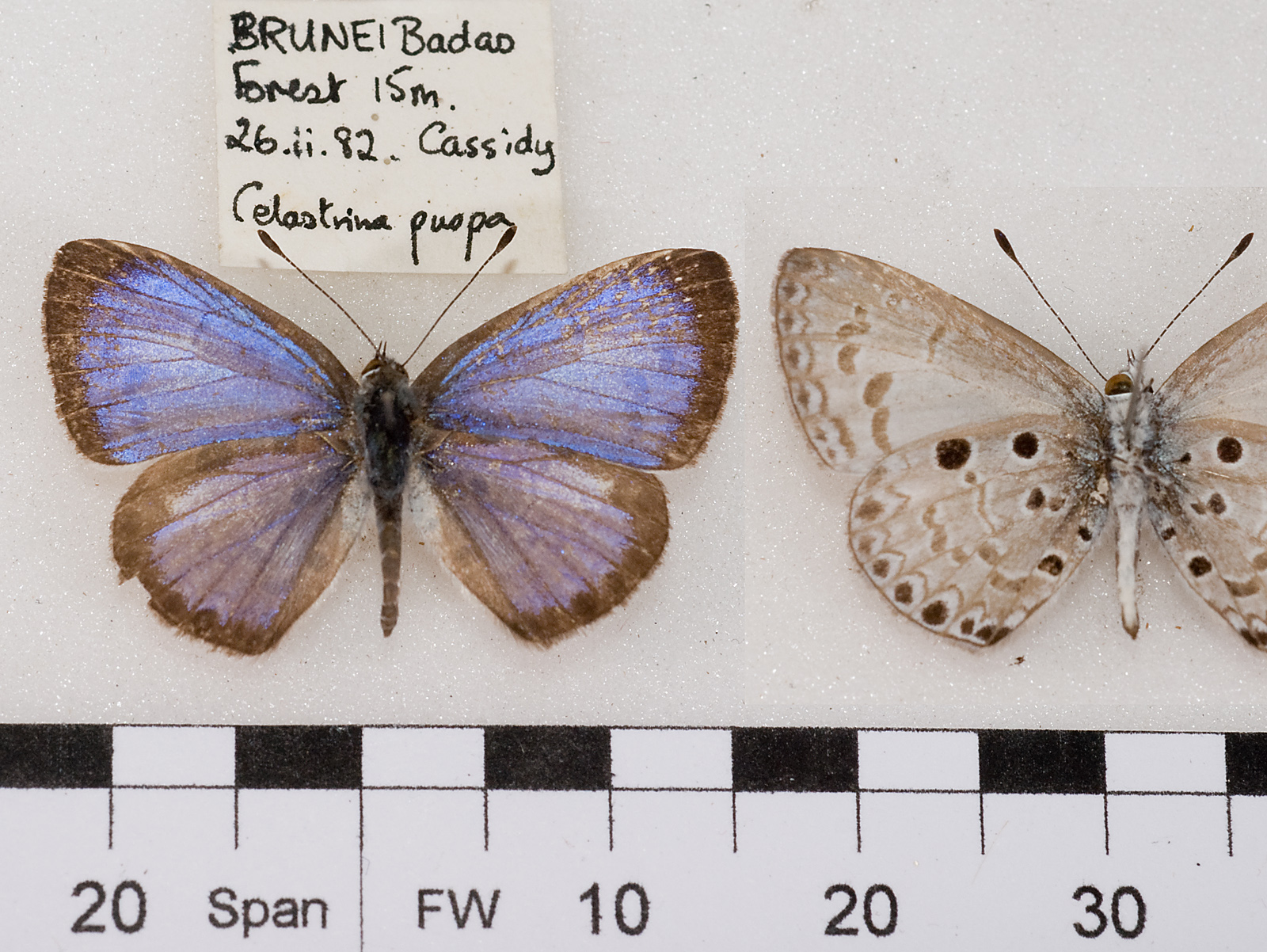
Acytolepis puspa mygdonia (Fruhstorfer, 1917).

== Status ==
Reported as common by Wynter-Blyth in India. Reported as rare in Andamans to very rare in Nicobars.

== Food plants ==
The larva has been recorded on Glochidion fortunei, Rhododendron species, Distylium racemosum, Rosa multiflora, Rosa wichuraina, Rosa centifolia, Prunus zippeliana, Glochidion obovatum, Myrica rubra, Quercus phillyraeoides, Celtis sinensis, Astilbe thunbergii, Schleichera oleosa, Hiptage benghalensis and Xylia dolabriformis.

== See also ==
- List of butterflies of India
- List of butterflies of India (Lycaenidae)
