= C17H36 =

The molecular formula C_{17}H_{36} (molar mass: 240.27 g/mol, exact mass: 240.2817 u) may refer to:

- 3,3-Di-tert-butyl-2,2,4,4-tetramethylpentane
- Heptadecane
- 2-Methylhexadecane
