= Julius Prott =

German opera singer (1841–1901)

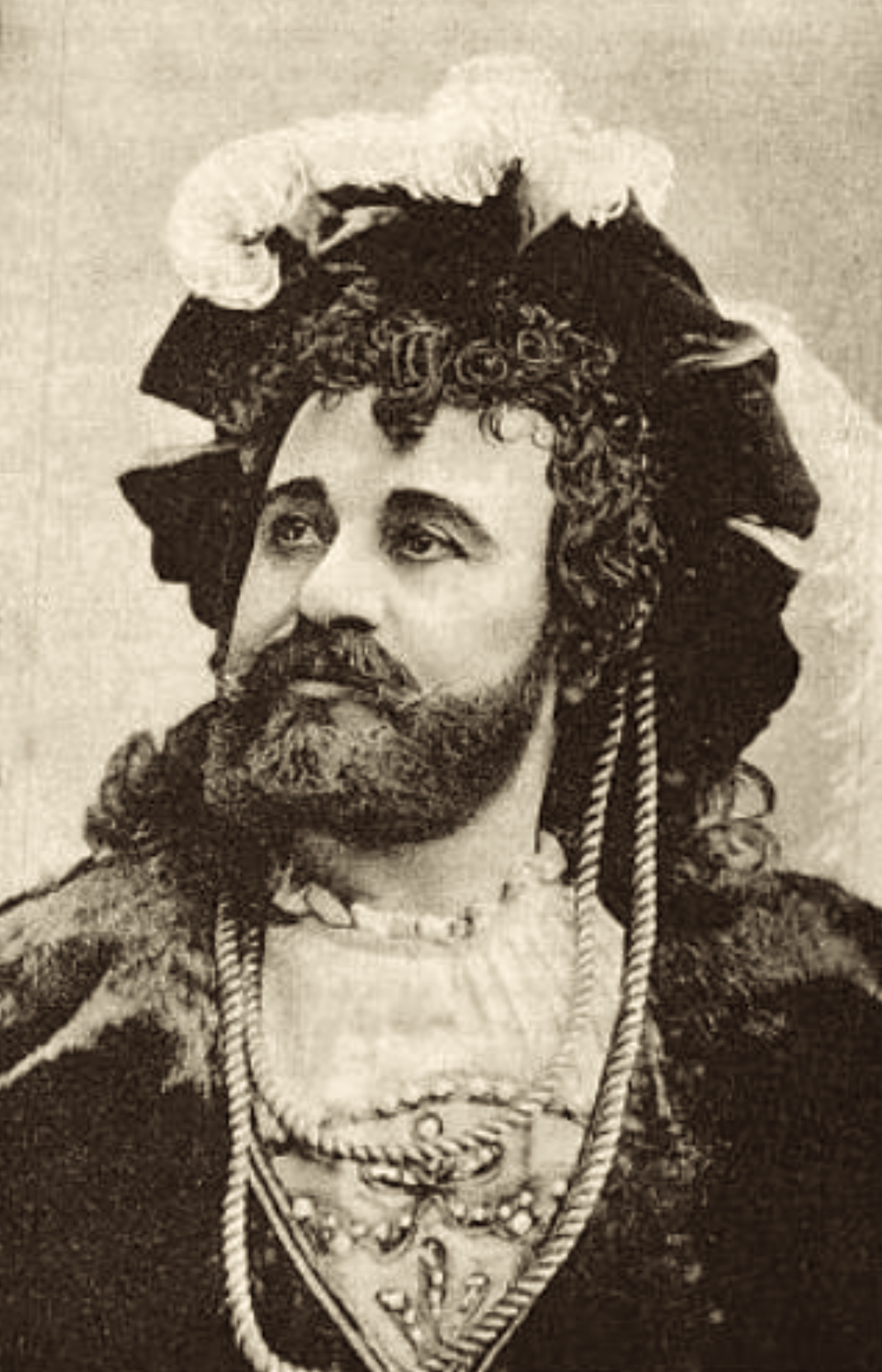
- Jules Perotti as Gounod's Faust at the Metropolitan Opera in 1890
- Born: 13 March 1841; Ueckermünde, Kingdom of Prussia
- Died: 28 February 1901 (aged 59); Milan, Kingdom of Italy
- Other names: Giulio Perotti; Jules Perotti; Julian Pierotti
- Occupations: Operatic tenor; Horticulturist
- Organizations: Hungarian State Opera House; Metropolitan Opera

Julius Prott, known variously on the stage or in recordings as Giulio Perotti, Julius Perotti, Jules Perotti, or Julian Pierotti, (13 March 1841 – 28 February 1901) was a German tenor and horticulturist. He had an active international career as an opera singer from 1863 until his death in 1901. He used many different stage names to obscure his German identity, passing himself off as Italian and French in ancestry. His native city of Ueckermünde hosts the annual International Giulio Perotti Singing Competition, named after him. In addition to his work as a singer, he operated a horticultural business in Trieste, Italy, and was highly regarded for his rose cultivation.

== Life and career ==
Julius Prott was born on 13 March 1841 in Ueckermünde, Germany. He initially apprenticed to be a businessman with his uncle in the city of Stettin. His uncle recognized his nephew's vocal talent and became his benefactor in supporting his music education. He was trained as a singer at the Stern Conservatory in Berlin. He pursued further vocal development in private lessons with tenor Gustave-Hippolyte Roger in Paris, conductor Pietro Romani in Florence, and voice teacher Francesco Lamperti in Milan. At various points in his career, he changed his name for marketing purposes to hide his German ancestry.

Prott made his professional opera debut at the Breslau Oper in 1863, after which he rapidly rose to prominence on the international opera stage with a career spanning more than 30 years. From 1866 to 1868 he was a member of the Vienna State Opera. In 1870 he gave his first performance at Theatre Royal, Drury Lane (TRDL) as the Duke of Mantua in Verdi's Rigoletto with Charles Santley in the title role and Madame Volpini as Gilda. Later that year he portrayed Erik in the first staging in England of Wagner's The Flying Dutchman at the TRDL. It was performed in Italian.

In 1872 Prott appeared at La Scala in Milan as Max in Weber's Der Freischütz. In 1873 he portrayed the title role in Gounod's Faust at the Teatro Apollo in Rome. In 1879 he established a horticultural business in Trieste which became internationally renowned for its rose cultivation. He continued to operate this business until his death, and was the teacher of horticulturalist Georg Arends. He was a resident leading tenor at the Hungarian State Opera House (HSOH) from 1878 to 1888. During these 10 years, he performed in 1,585 performances at the HSOH in 92 different roles. He later performed with the HSOH again from 1892 to 1900.

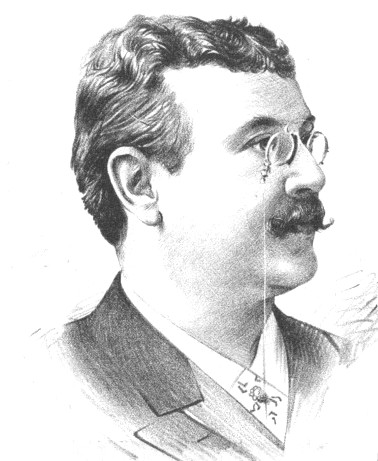
Giulio Perotti in 1894

From 1888 to 1890 Prott worked in New York as a tenor at the Metropolitan Opera. When he made his Met debut on 28 November 1888 as Raoul de Nangis in Meyerbeer's Les Huguenots he was billed as Julius Perotti. Other roles he sang with the Met in the 1888-1890 period included Arnold in Rossini's William Tell, Assad in Die Königin von Saba, Don Ottavio in Mozart's Don Giovanni (1890 on tour at the Chicago Auditorium), Eléazar in La Juive, Jean of Leyden in Le prophète, Manrico in Il trovatore, Radamès in Verdi's Aida, Riccardo in Verdi's Un ballo in maschera, Siegmund in Wagner's Die Walküre, Vasco de Gama in L'Africaine, and the title roles in Faust, Wagner's Lohengrin, Rienzi, and Tannhäuser.

In spring 1889, Prott formed his own concert organization, the Juch-Perotti Concert Company, with soprano Emma Juch. At this period of his career he was billed as Jules Perotti. With Juch he was a soloist at the very first Indianapolis May Festival for its inaugural opening on 27 May 1889, in a concert that also featured cellist and conductor Victor Herbert. He later sang at the Met again in the 1899–1900 season, returning to his parts in Aida (with Emma Eames), Il trovatore (with Lillian Nordica), Les Huguenots, Lohengrin (with Susan Strong as Elsa), and Tannhäuser. He sang one new part with the Met in this period, Edgardo in Lucia di Lammermoor with Marcella Sembrich in the title role.

In October and November 1900, he starred in the Broadway musical burlesque Nell-Go-In by A. Baldwin Sloane at the New York Theatre with a cast led by actress Mabel Fenton. He also appeared as Faust to Marie Tavary's Marguerite at the Grand Opera House in Philadelphia in December 1900. His career also included guest appearances in many other opera houses in Italy, Spain, Russia, and South America. Other roles in his repertoire included the title roles in Otello and Siegfried among many others.

Prott died in Milan on 28 February 1901. An annual singing competition named for Perotti is held in the city of Ueckermünde, where he was born. A portrait of Perotti hangs in the castle Schloss Ueckermünde as part of the Haff Museum collection, and a monument to Perotti was also built in the town outside of Ueckermünde's cinema. His voice is preserved on several recordings made with Gianni Bettini under the name Julian Pierotti.
