= False spiraea =

False spiraea or false spirea is a common name for several plants and may refer to:

- Astilbe Arendsii Group
- Sorbaria sorbifolia, native to Asia
