= Astilbe glaberrima =

Scientific classification
- Kingdom: Plantae
- Clade: Tracheophytes
- Clade: Angiosperms
- Clade: Eudicots
- Order: Saxifragales
- Family: Saxifragaceae
- Genus: Astilbe
- Species: A. glaberrima

Binomial name
- Astilbe glaberrima Nakai

Species of flowering plant

Astilbe glaberrima, called the florist's spiraea and smooth rock astilbe, is a species of flowering plant in the genus Astilbe, native to Yakushima Island, Japan. Some authorities have it as a subspecies of Astilbe japonica, Astilbe japonica subsp. glaberrima. Its dwarf variety Astilbe glaberrima var. saxatilis has gained the Royal Horticultural Society's Award of Garden Merit.

== Varieties ==
The following varieties are currently accepted:

- Astilbe glaberrima var. glaberrima
- Astilbe glaberrima var. saxatilis (Nakai) H.Ohba
