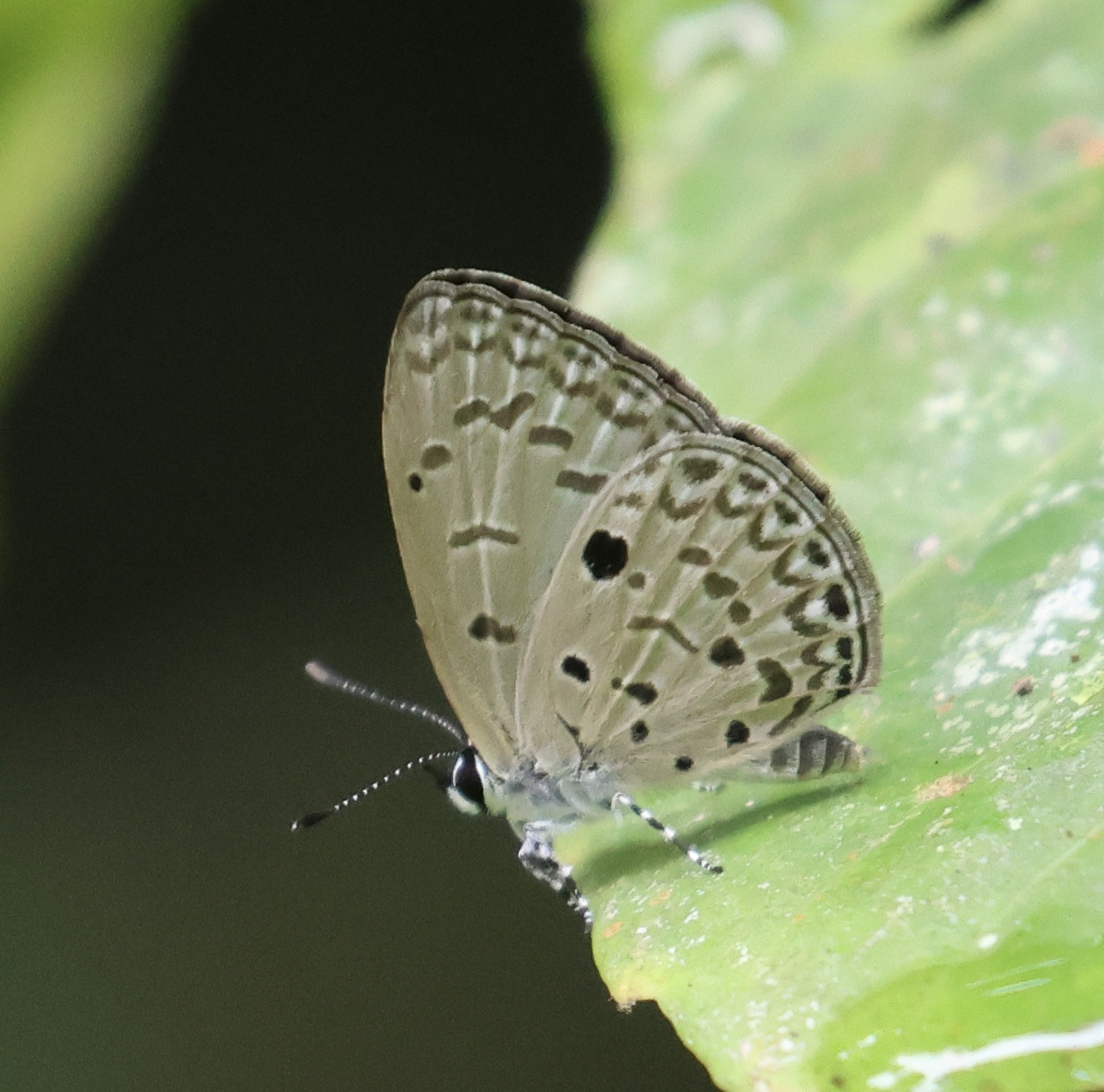

Scientific classification
- Domain: Eukaryota
- Kingdom: Animalia
- Phylum: Arthropoda
- Class: Insecta
- Order: Lepidoptera
- Family: Lycaenidae
- Genus: Acytolepis
- Species: A. ripte

Binomial name
- Acytolepis ripte (H.H.Druce, 1895)

Synonyms
- Cyaniris ripte H.H.Druce, 1895

= Acytolepis ripte =

Species of butterfly

Acytolepis ripte is a butterfly of the family Lycaenidae. It is found on Borneo.
