= 2-Methylhexadecane =

Names
- IUPAC name 2-Methylhexadecane

Identifiers
CAS Number	1560-92-5
3D model (JSmol)	Interactive image
ChEBI	CHEBI:183297
ChemSpider	14531
EC Number	680-567-4
PubChem CID	15266
UNII	0UAR331X65
CompTox Dashboard (EPA)	DTXSID10166025
- InChI: InChI=1S/C17H36/c1-4-5-6-7-8-9-10-11-12-13-14-15-16-17(2)3/h17H,4-16H2,1-3H3 Key: FNWWOHKUXFTKGN-UHFFFAOYSA-N
- SMILES: CCCCCCCCCCCCCCC(C)C

Properties
Chemical formula	C_{17}H_{36}
Molar mass	240.475 g·mol^{−1}
Solubility in water	Insoluble
- Except where otherwise noted, data are given for materials in their standard state (at 25 °C [77 °F], 100 kPa). Infobox references

2-Methylhexadecane is an alkane hydrocarbon with the chemical formula C_{17}H_{36}.

== Occurrence ==
2-Methylhexadecane has been reported in several plants including Capsicum annuum, Panax ginseng, Arctostaphylos uva-ursi, Zanthoxylum zanthoxyloides, and Astilbe chinensis.

It has been identified as a metabolite of cyanobacteria such as Microcoleus vaginatus.
