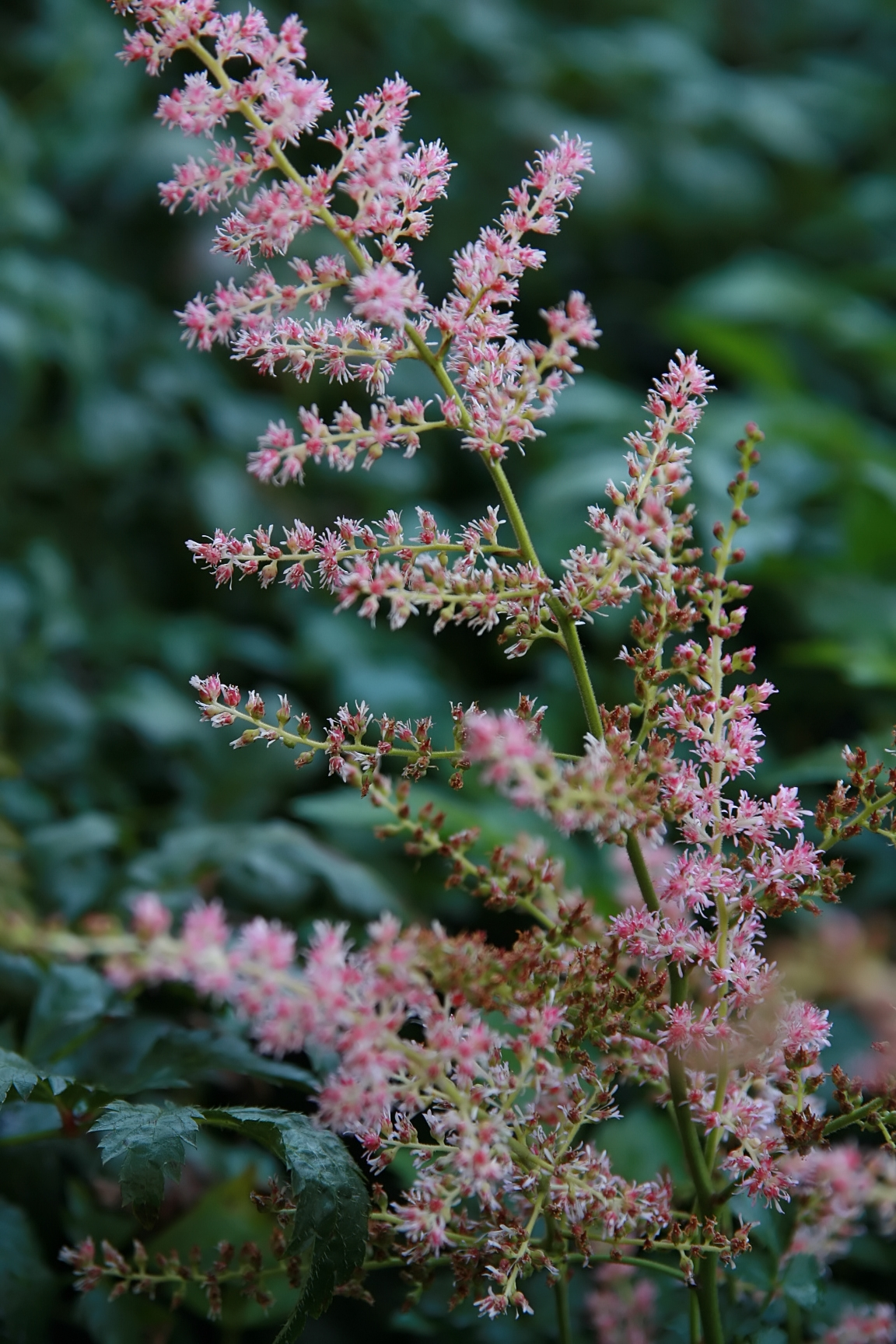
- Astilbe simplicifolia 'Hennie Graafland'

Scientific classification
- Kingdom: Plantae
- Clade: Tracheophytes
- Clade: Angiosperms
- Clade: Eudicots
- Order: Saxifragales
- Family: Saxifragaceae
- Genus: Astilbe
- Species: A. simplicifolia

Binomial name
- Astilbe simplicifolia Makino

= Astilbe simplicifolia =

Species of flowering plant

Astilbe simplicifolia, the entire-leaved astilbe, is a species of flowering plant in the family Saxifragaceae native to Japan and North Korea. It is a perennial herb that grows up to 1–1.5 ft (0.30–0.46 m) tall. The Latin specific epithet simplicifolia is in reference to its leaves which are simple. It and its hybrid cultivars 'Atrorosea', 'Bronce Elegans' and 'Sprite' have gained the Royal Horticultural Society's Award of Garden Merit.
