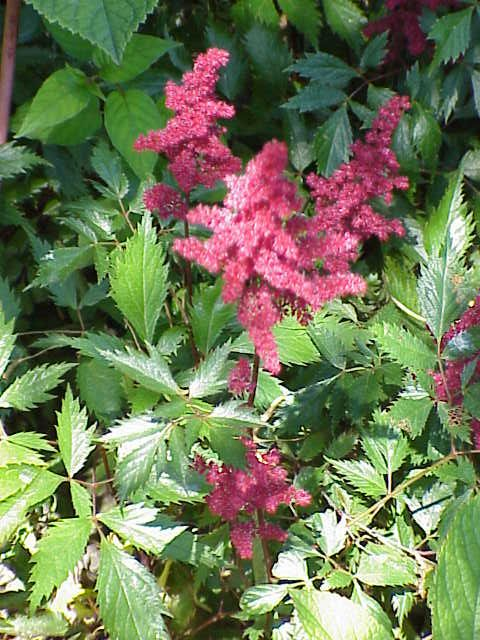
- Astilbe arendsii in flower

Scientific classification
- Kingdom: Plantae
- Clade: Tracheophytes
- Clade: Angiosperms
- Clade: Eudicots
- Order: Saxifragales
- Family: Saxifragaceae
- Genus: Astilbe; Buch.-Ham. ex D.Don

Type species
- Astilbe rivularis Buch.-Ham. ex D.Don

Species
- 28; see text

Synonyms
- Hoteia C.Morren & Decne. (1834)

= Astilbe =

Genus of flowering plants

Astilbe /əˈstɪlbiː/ is a genus of 18 species of rhizomatous flowering plants within the family Saxifragaceae, native to mountain ravines and woodlands in Asia and North America. Some species are known by the common names false goat's beard and false spirea.

Species range from New Guinea, Java, Borneo, and the Philippines to Indochina, the Himalayas, China, Japan, and the Russian Far East, and to the southeastern United States.

These hardy herbaceous perennials are cultivated by gardeners for their large, handsome, often fern-like foliage and dense, feathery plumes of flowers. They are widely adapted to shade and water-logged conditions, hence they are particularly associated with pond-side planting. They also tolerate clay soils well. Numerous hybrid cultivars have been raised. Flowers of at least some Astilbe species have a strong and pleasant aroma. Some species, including Astilbe rivularis, are used in traditional medicine.

== Species ==
28 species, and several natural hybrids, are accepted.

- Astilbe × amabilis H.Hara
- Astilbe apoensis Hallier f.
- Astilbe biternata (Vent.) Britton ex Kearney – Appalachian false goat's beard
- Astilbe chinensis (Maxim.) Franch. & Sav.
- Astilbe crenatiloba (Britton) Small
- Astilbe formosa (Nakai) Nakai
- Astilbe glaberrima Nakai
- Astilbe grandis Stapf ex E.H.Wilson – Korean false goat's beard
- Astilbe hachijoensis Nakai
- Astilbe japonica (C.Morren & Decne.) A.Gray
- Astilbe koreana (Kom.) Nakai
- Astilbe longicarpa (Hayata) Hayata
- Astilbe longipedicellata (Hatus.) S.Akiyama & Kadota
- Astilbe longipilosa Gilli
- Astilbe macrocarpa Knoll
- Astilbe macroflora Hayata
- Astilbe microphylla Knoll
  - Astilbe microphylla var. riparia Hatus.
- Astilbe okuyamae H.Hara
- Astilbe papuana Schltr.
- Astilbe philippinensis L.Henry
- Astilbe × photeinophylla Koidz.
- Astilbe platyphylla H. Boiss.
- Astilbe rivularis Buch.-Ham. ex D. Don
  - Astilbe rivularis var. angustifoliolata H.Hara
  - Astilbe rivularis var. myriantha (Diels) J.T.Pan
- Astilbe rubra Hook.f. & Thomson – false goat's beard
- Astilbe shikokiana Nakai
- Astilbe simplicifolia Makino – entire-leaf false goat's beard
- Astilbe taquetii (H.Lév.) Koidz.
- Astilbe thunbergii (Siebold & Zucc.) Miq.
  - Astilbe thunbergii var. congesta H.Boissieu
  - Astilbe thunbergii var. fujisanensis (Nakai) Ohwi
  - Astilbe thunbergii var. hachijoensis (Nakai) Ohwi
  - Astilbe thunbergii var. kiusiana Hara
  - Astilbe thunbergii var. longipedicellata Hatus.
  - Astilbe thunbergii var. okuyamae (Hara) Ohwi
  - Astilbe thunbergii var. shikokiana (Nakai) Ohwi
  - Astilbe thunbergii var. terrestris (Nakai) Ohwi
- Astilbe tsushimensis Kadota
- Astilbe uljinensis B.U.Oh & H.J.Choi

== Cultivar groups ==
Commonly accepted cultivar groups are:

- Astilbe Arendsii Group
- Astilbe Crispa Group
- Astilbe Japonica Group
- Astilbe Simplicifolia Group

The following varieties and cultivars have gained the Royal Horticultural Society's Award of Garden Merit:

- 'Brautschleier' (Arendsii Group) - white
- 'Bronce elegans' (Simplicifolia) - salmon pink
- A. chinensis var. pumila - mauve
- A. chinensis var. taqueti 'Purpurlanze' - red/purple
- A. chinensis var. taqueti 'Superba' - rose/mauve
- 'Fanal' (Arendsii) - crimson
- A. glaberrima var. saxatilis - pink & white, prostrate
- 'Rheinland' (Japonica) - pale pink
- A. simplicifolia
- 'Sprite' (Simplicifolia) - pale pink
- 'Straussenfeder' (Thunbergii) - pink
- A. × crispa 'Perkeo' (pink)

== Cultivation ==
There are three UK National Collections of Astilbe, held by:

- Malcolm Pharaoh at Marwood Hill Gardens in Marwood, near Barnstaple, North Devon.
- The Lakeland Horticultural Society at Holehird Gardens in Cumbria.
- The Royal Horticultural Society at RHS Garden Wisley in Surrey (cultivars bred by Georg Arends).
