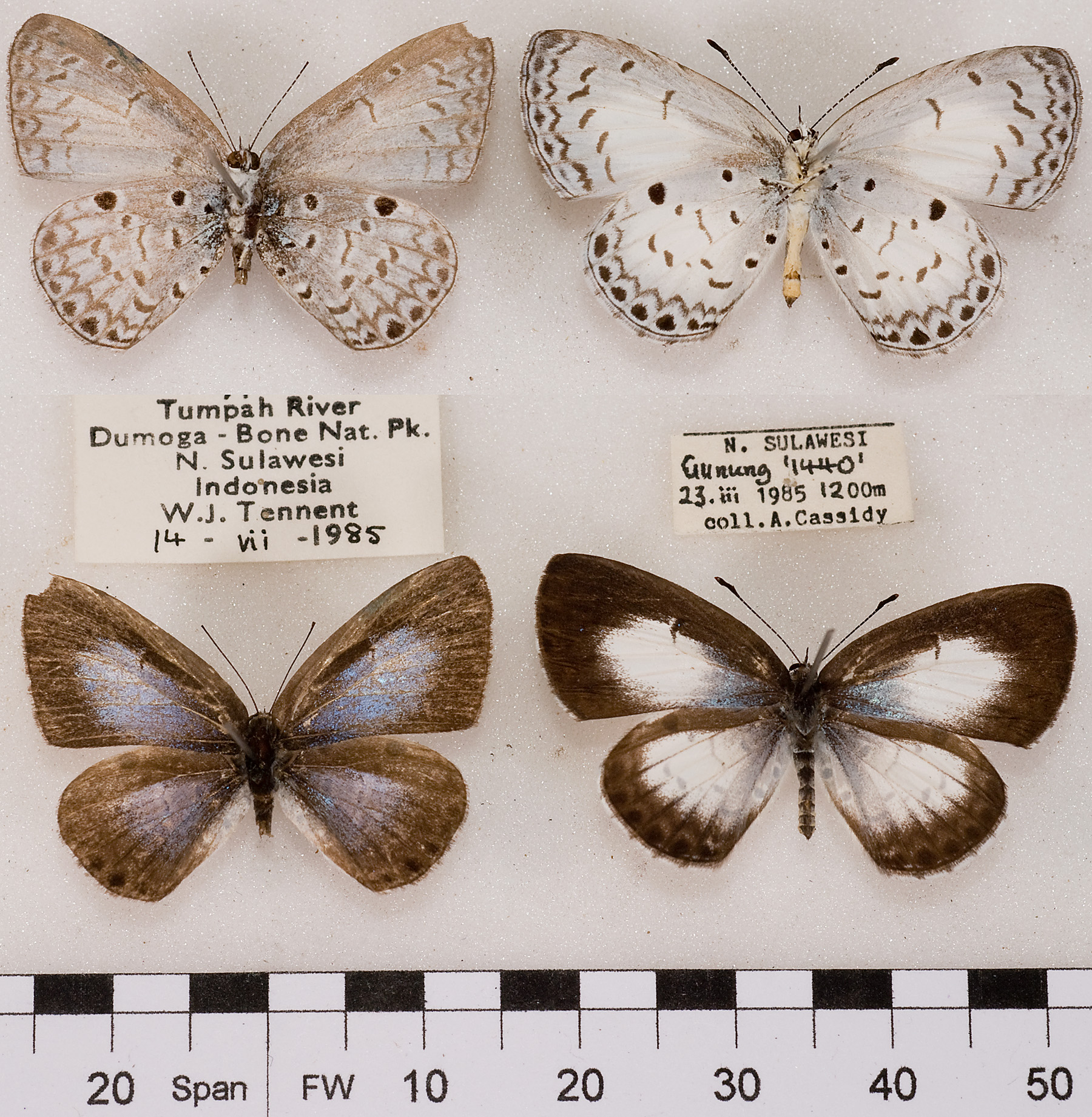

Scientific classification
- Domain: Eukaryota
- Kingdom: Animalia
- Phylum: Arthropoda
- Class: Insecta
- Order: Lepidoptera
- Family: Lycaenidae
- Genus: Acytolepis
- Species: A. samanga

Binomial name
- Acytolepis samanga (Fruhstorfer, 1910)

Synonyms
- Cyaniris samanga Fruhstorfer, 1910; Celastrina samanga Fruhstorfer, 1910

= Acytolepis samanga =

Species of butterfly

Acytolepis samanga is a butterfly of the family Lycaenidae. It is endemic to Sulawesi.
