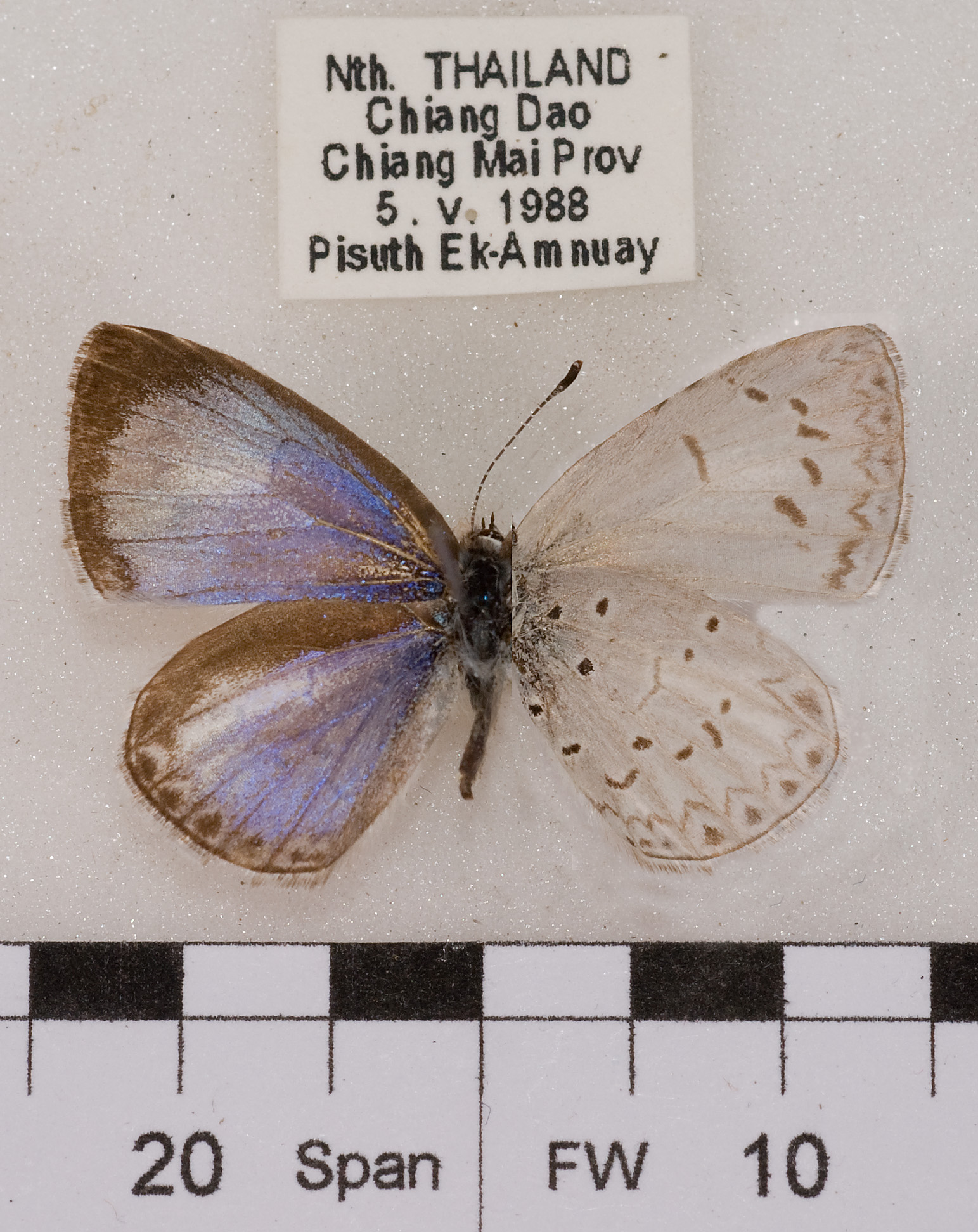

Scientific classification
- Domain: Eukaryota
- Kingdom: Animalia
- Phylum: Arthropoda
- Class: Insecta
- Order: Lepidoptera
- Family: Lycaenidae
- Genus: Acytolepis
- Species: A. lilacea

Binomial name
- Acytolepis lilacea (Hampson, 1889)

= Acytolepis lilacea =

Hampson's hedge blue

Species of butterfly

Hampson's hedge blue (Acytolepis lilacea) is a small butterfly found in Sri Lanka, south India, Myanmar, and Laos that belongs to the lycaenids or blues family.

== Description ==
Male upperside: shining purplish black. Forewing: costa narrowly and evenly for three-fourths of its length from base, apex broadly and terminal margin decreasingly jet black; cilia black. Hindwing: costa and apex broadly, termen narrowly, bordered with black; a subterminal series of small round black spots that merge anteriorly into the black at apex j cilia black, tipped with white. Underside: opaque chalk white. Forewing: the following black markings: a broad short bar on the discocellulars; a discal transverse series of prominent spots in interspaces 1 to 6, the spot in interspace 1 elongate, in 2 and 3 oval and placed obliquely on the wing, in 4 elongate and pointing obliquely outwards, in 5 and 6 rounded, the spot in interspace 6 shifted a little inwards; beyond these discal markings is a transverse series of slender black lunules, followed by a subterminal series of minute round black spots, one in each interspace and a very slender anteciliary black line; cilia on the underside white. Hindwing: also with the following black markings: a minute spot at base, followed by two larger spots one above the other, a sinuous short line oil the discocellulars, and just beyond it a transverse somewhat curved series of four slightly quadrate spots, two subcostal and two posterior; a discal series of four more spots, the lowest one curved, the next spot round, the next elongate and placed pointing obliquely outwards, lastly the apical spot of the series round; terminal markings and cilia as on the forewing. Antennae, head, thorax and abdomen black, the antenna ringed with white and a white line along the inner and outer orbits of the eyes; beneath: the palpi, thorax and abdomen white.

Female upperside: brownish black. Forewing: from base for a little more than two-thirds of its length and from the posterior half of the discoidal cell to the dorsum white, beautifully glossed with purplish blue at the upper outer corner of the area indicated above, which is pure white. Hindwing: glossed with blue over a broad central area from base to a broad brownish-black terminal border, on the inner margin of which and partially coalescing with it is a transverse series of large round jet-black spots, inwardly narrowly and obscurely margined with bluish white; this colour at the anterior spots carried as streaks inwards for a short distance. Underside: as in the male. Antennae, head, thorax and abdomen also similar.

== Taxonomy ==
The butterfly was earlier known as Lycaenopsis lilacea (Hampson).

== Range ==
It is found in Sri Lanka, south-western and north-eastern India, Myanmar, and Laos
