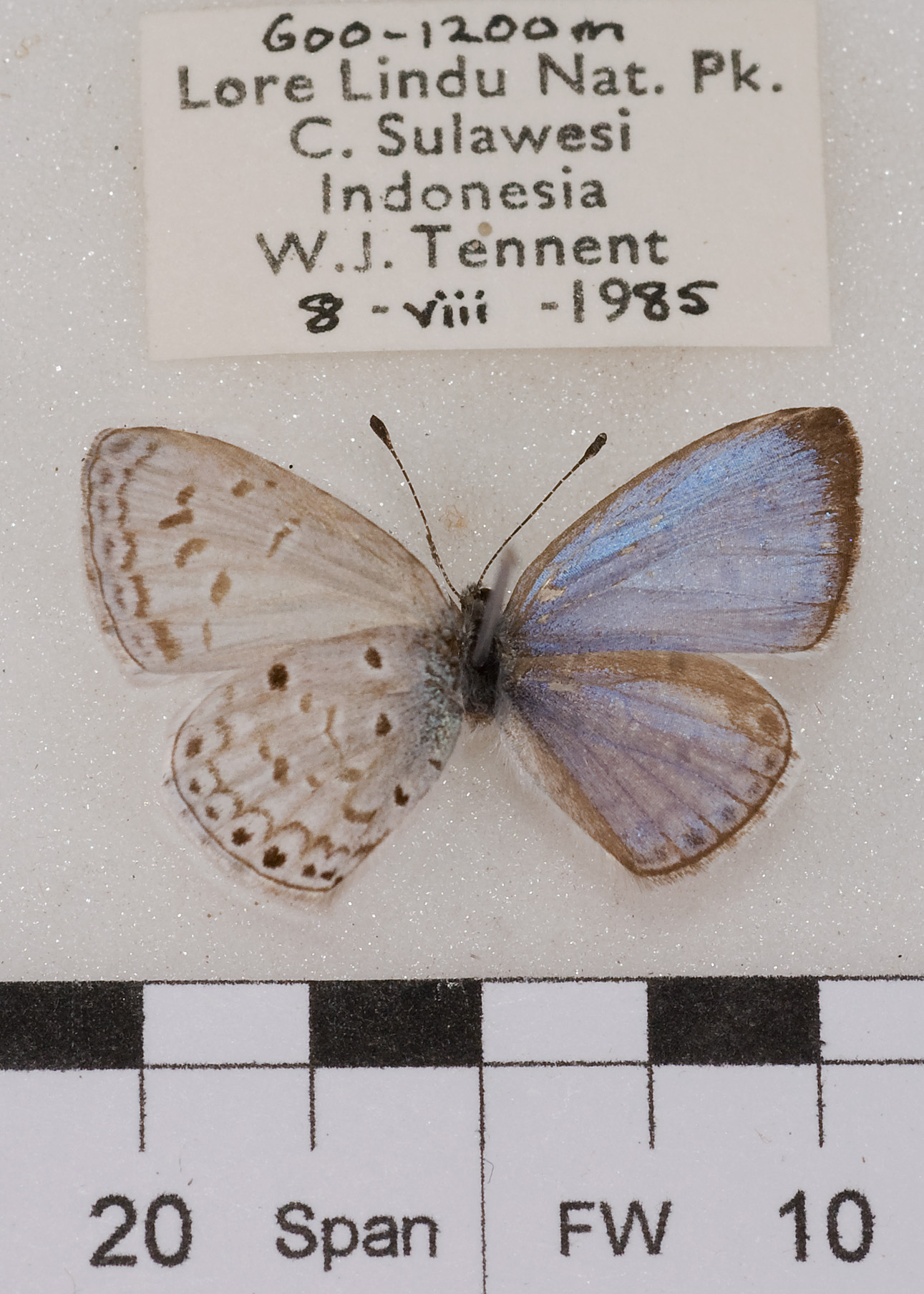

Scientific classification
- Domain: Eukaryota
- Kingdom: Animalia
- Phylum: Arthropoda
- Class: Insecta
- Order: Lepidoptera
- Family: Lycaenidae
- Genus: Acytolepis
- Species: A. najara

Binomial name
- Acytolepis najara (Fruhstorfer, 1910)

Synonyms
- Cyaniris najara Fruhstorfer, 1910: 287 (partim, ♂ nec '♀').; Lycaenopsis puspa kühni f. najara Fruhstorfer, 1917; Lycaenopsis puspa najara Fruhstorfer, 1922

= Acytolepis najara =

Species of butterfly

Acytolepis najara is a butterfly of the family Lycaenidae. It is endemic to Sulawesi.
