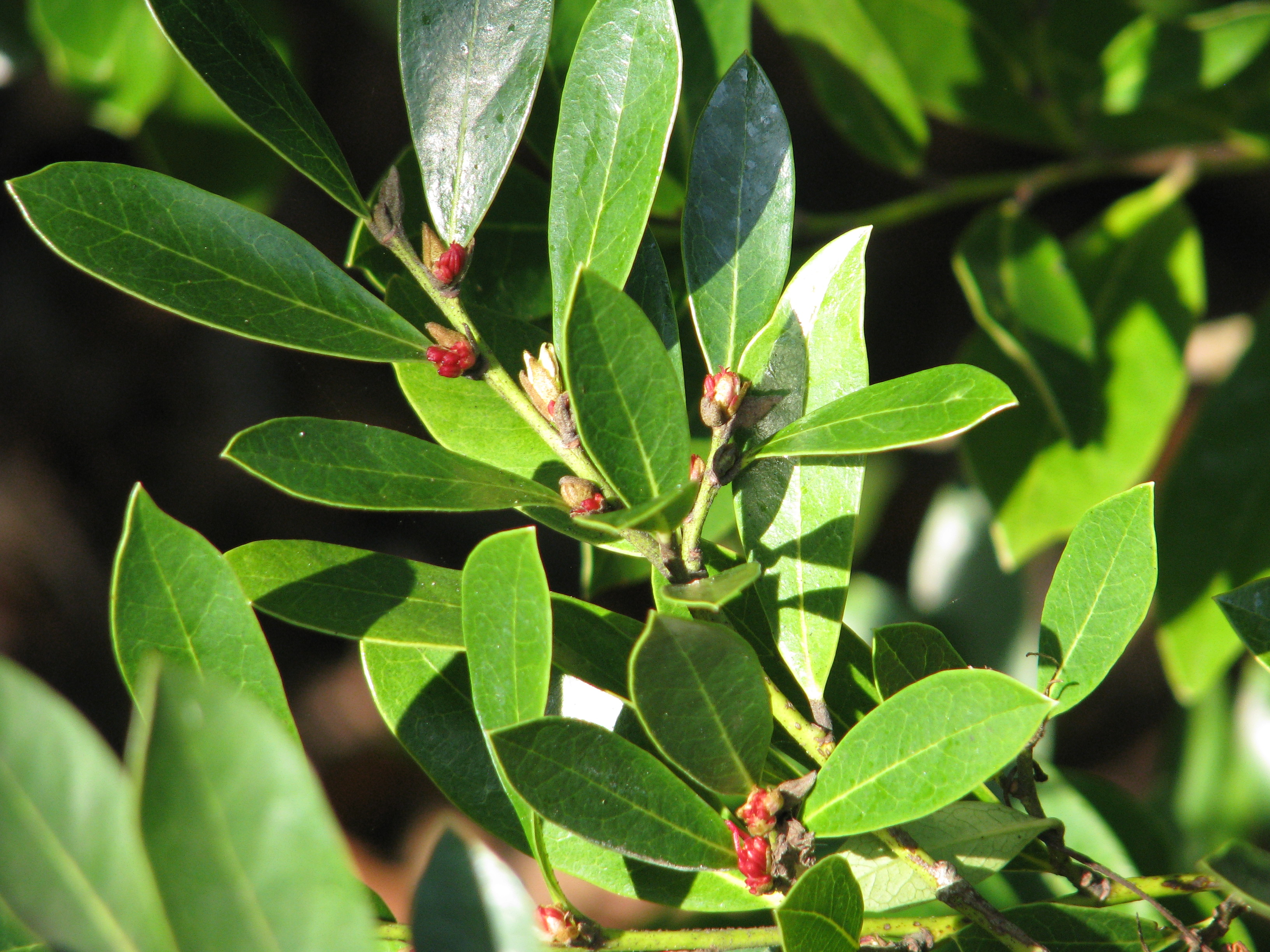
- Distylium myricoides

Conservation status
- Least Concern (IUCN 3.1)

Scientific classification
- Kingdom: Plantae
- Clade: Tracheophytes
- Clade: Angiosperms
- Clade: Eudicots
- Order: Saxifragales
- Family: Hamamelidaceae
- Genus: Distylium
- Species: D. myricoides

Binomial name
- Distylium myricoides Hemsl.

Synonyms
- Distylium myricoides var. macrocarpum C.Y.Wu; Distylium myricoides var. nitidum Hung T.Chang

= Distylium myricoides =

Species of plant

Distylium myricoides is a species in the genus Distylium in the family Hamamelidaceae. It is native to southern China.

== Description ==
Distylium myricoides is a woody evergreen perennial shrub or small tree. It flowers from April-June, and fruits from June-August.

== Etymology ==
Distylium is derived from Greek and means 'two styles'. The name is in reference to the plant's prominent, separate styles.

Myricoides means 'resembling Myrica'.
