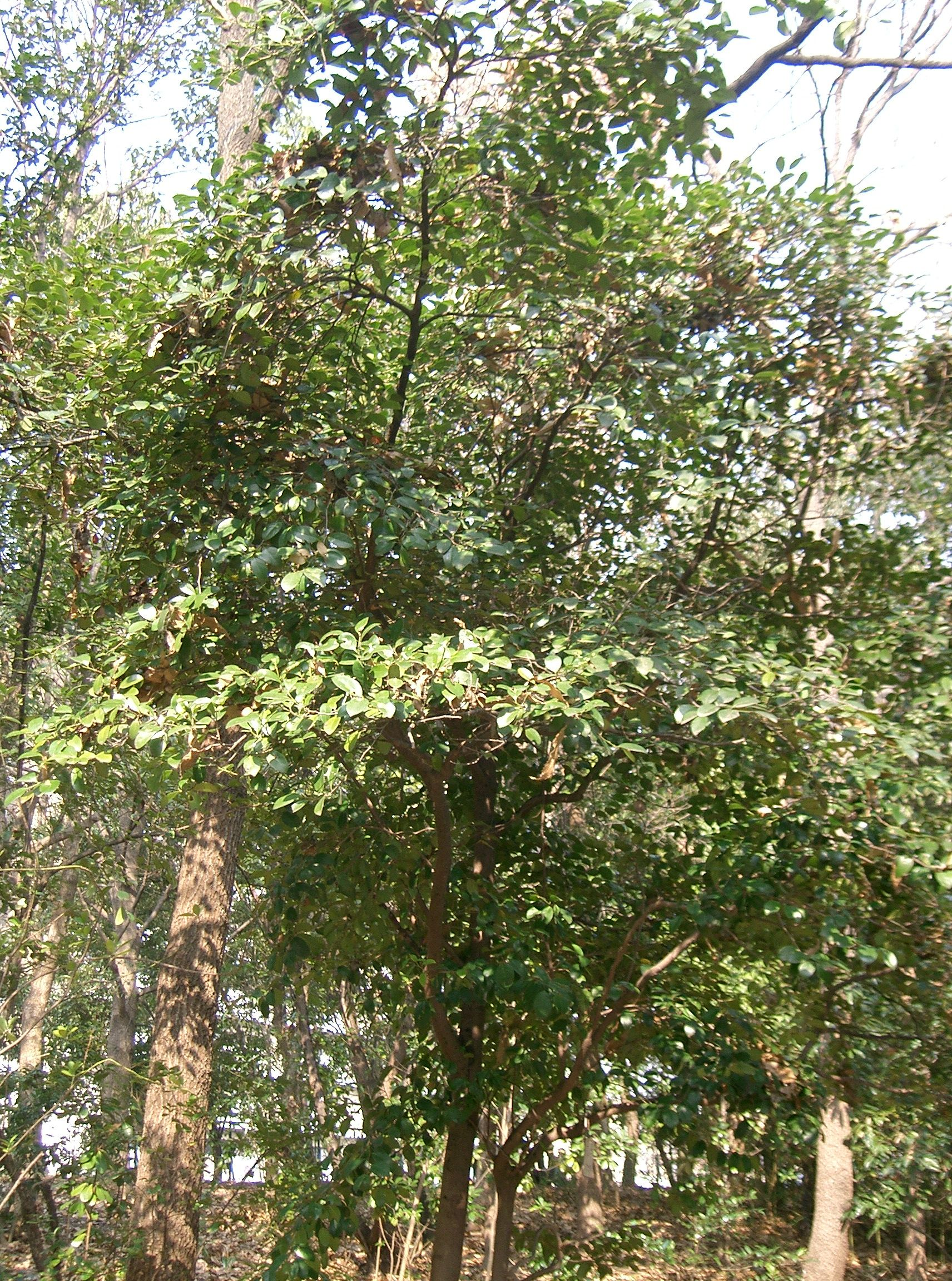
- Distylium racemosum in Japan

Scientific classification
- Kingdom: Plantae
- Clade: Tracheophytes
- Clade: Angiosperms
- Clade: Eudicots
- Order: Saxifragales
- Family: Hamamelidaceae
- Subfamily: Hamamelidoideae
- Tribe: Fothergilleae
- Genus: Distylium; Siebold & Zucc.

Species
- See text

Synonyms
- Saxifragites Gagnep.

= Distylium =

Genus of flowering plants

Distylium (winter-hazel) is a genus of 16 species of evergreen shrubs and trees in the witch hazel family, Hamamelidaceae, native to eastern and southeastern Asia.

== Taxonomy ==
=== Fossil record ===
Researchers have recognized Distylium fossil pollen among the middle Miocene Sarmatian palynoflora from the Lavanttal Basin of Austria. The sediment containing the fossil pollen had accumulated in a lowland wetland environment with various vegetation units of mixed evergreen/deciduous broadleaved/conifer forests surrounding the wetland basin. Key relatives of the fossil taxa found with Distylium are presently confined to humid warm temperate environments, suggesting a subtropical climate during the middle Miocene in Austria. Distylium macrofossils of the Lower and Middle Miocene, are known from the lignite mines of the Kaltennortheim Formation in the Rhön Mountains, central Germany, where it is associated with typical elements of the Mastixioid floras that attest to an optimal warm humid phase of the Miocene.

=== Species ===
16 species are accepted.

- Distylium annamicum (Gagnep.) Airy Shaw – eastern Thailand and southern Vietnam
- Distylium buxifolium (Hance) Merr. - China
- Distylium chinense (Franch. ex Hemsl.) Diels - China
- Distylium chungii (F.P.Metcalf) W.C.Cheng - China
- Distylium cuspidatum H.T.Chang - China
- Distylium dunnianum H.Lév. - China
- Distylium elaeagnoides H.T.Chang - China
- Distylium gracile Nakai - China
- Distylium indicum Benth. ex C.B.Clarke – Meghalaya to Indochina
- Distylium lepidotum Nakai – Ogasawara Islands
- Distylium macrophyllum H.T.Chang - China
- Distylium myricoides Hemsl. - China
- Distylium pingpienense (Hu) E.Walker - China
- Distylium racemosum Siebold & Zucc. - tree up to 20m; China, Korea, Japan (Ryukyu Islands)(known as Isunoki(イスノキ)/Nara(柞), Taiwan
- Distylium stellare Kuntze – Peninsular Malaysia, Sumatra, Java, and Lesser Sunda Islands
- Distylium tsiangii Chun ex Walker - China
