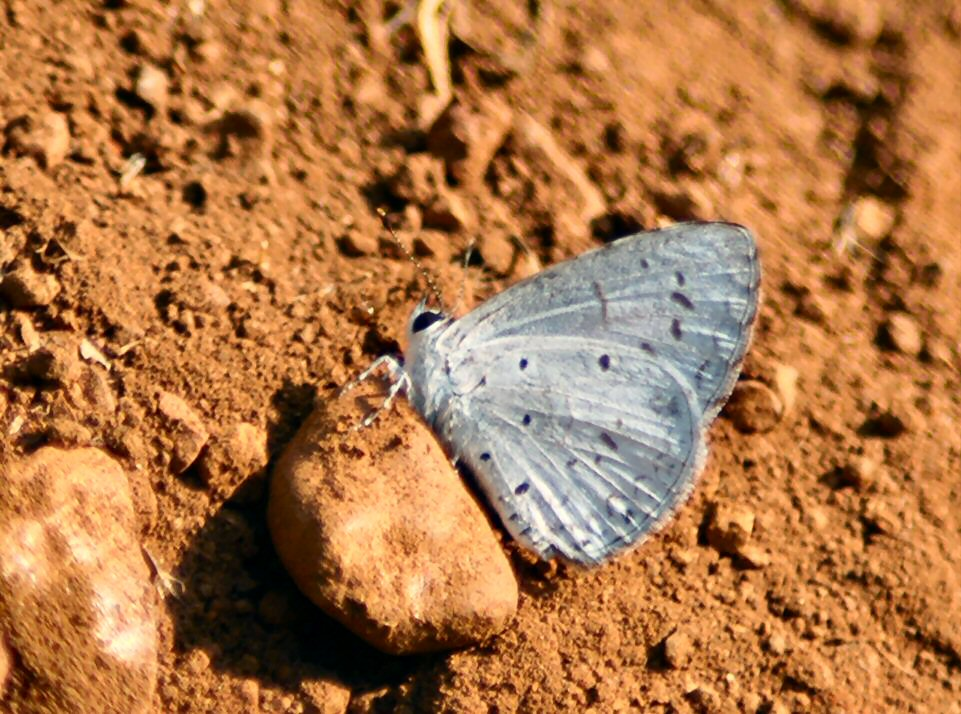
- Acytolepis puspa

Scientific classification
- Domain: Eukaryota
- Kingdom: Animalia
- Phylum: Arthropoda
- Class: Insecta
- Order: Lepidoptera
- Family: Lycaenidae
- Subfamily: Polyommatinae
- Tribe: Polyommatini
- Genus: Acytolepis (Toxopeus, 1927)

= Acytolepis =

Butterfly genus in family Lycaenidae

Acytolepis is a genus of small butterflies that belongs to the lycaenids or blues (family Lycaenidae). The genus was first described by Lambertus Johannes Toxopeus in 1927. The species are found in the Indomalayan and the Australasian realms.

== Taxonomy ==
The type specimen for the genus Acytolepis is Acytolepis puspa.

== Species ==
- Acytolepis puspa (Horsfield, 1828)
- Acytolepis lilacea (Hampson, 1889)
- Acytolepis najara (Fruhstorfer, 1910)
- Acytolepis ripte (H. H. Druce, 1895)
- Acytolepis samanga (Fruhstorfer, 1910)

== See also ==
- List of butterflies of India
- List of butterflies of India (Lycaenidae)
