= Georg Arends =

German horticulturist (1863–1952)

Georg Adalbert Arends
- Born: September 21, 1863; Essen, Prussia
- Died: March 5, 1952 (aged 88); Wuppertal-Ronsdorf, West Germany
- Education: Geisenheim Grape Breeding Institute, Botanical Garden of Breslau
- Occupations: Horticulturist, Nurseryman
- Known for: Herbaceous perennial plant breeding, Astilbe Arendsii Group, Phlox × arendsii, Aconitum x arendsii
- Notable work: 350+ hybrids
- Spouse: Helene Pfeifer
- Children: Erich Arends, Werner Arends
- Parents: Karl Arends (father); Sophie Steckel (mother)

Georg Adalbert Arends (1863–1952) was a German horticulturist. He is best known for his work with herbaceous perennial plants.

== Education and training ==
Arends was born to the nurseryman Karl Arends and Sophie Steckel on 21 September 1863 in Essen, Prussia. Since he was the seventh of twelve children and was not the eldest son, he was not expected to inherit the family's plant nursery. He nevertheless became interested in plants, training at Geisenheim Grape Breeding Institute and completing an apprenticeship at the Botanical Garden of Breslau. Arends moved to the United Kingdom in 1885, where he was exposed to a relaxed garden style that differed from the German trend in putting more emphasis on perennials than on shrubs. After a year of working in a nursery in Tottenham, Arends went to the Imperial Free City of Trieste, where he was trained by Giulio Perotti.

== Career ==
Arends returned to his homeland in 1888, and started a nursery in Wuppertal. The business took off. On 14 May 1891, he married Helene Pfeifer, with whom he had two sons, Erich and Werner. By the beginning of the 20th century, Arends started selectively breeding perennials. Among the earliest plants he bred selectively were Astilbe, which gained popularity thanks to his work. Through hybridization he created more brightly colored plants known as Astilbe Arendsii Group. Phlox × arendsii originated in 1912, when Arends crossed the impressively blooming P. paniculata with the compact P. divaricata. Another popular hybrid created by Arends is Aconitum x arendsii. Arends created around 350 hybrids that bear his name.

Arends' nursery was almost entirely destroyed during the Allied bombing of Germany in the Second World War. Arends and his sons rebuilt it, but its reputation faded as the ageing Arends refused to pass it on. Arends died on 5 March 1952 in Wuppertal-Ronsdorf. His business was inherited by his sons, but Erich sold his share to for housing development. The nursery established by Arends passed from Werner to his daughter Ursula, and it is today owned by her daughter Anja Maubach.
