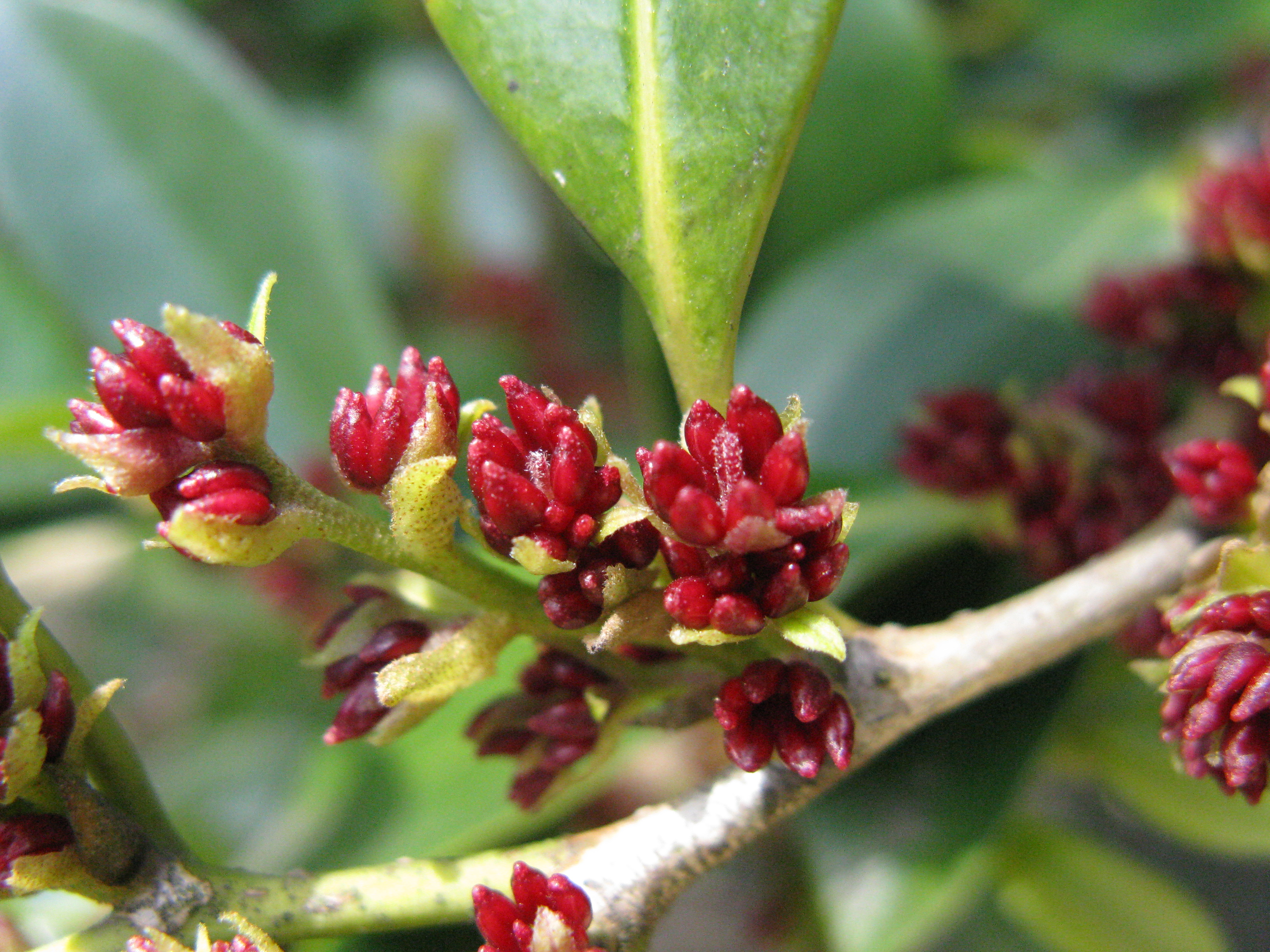
- Flowers lack petals but have red calyces and maroon stamens.
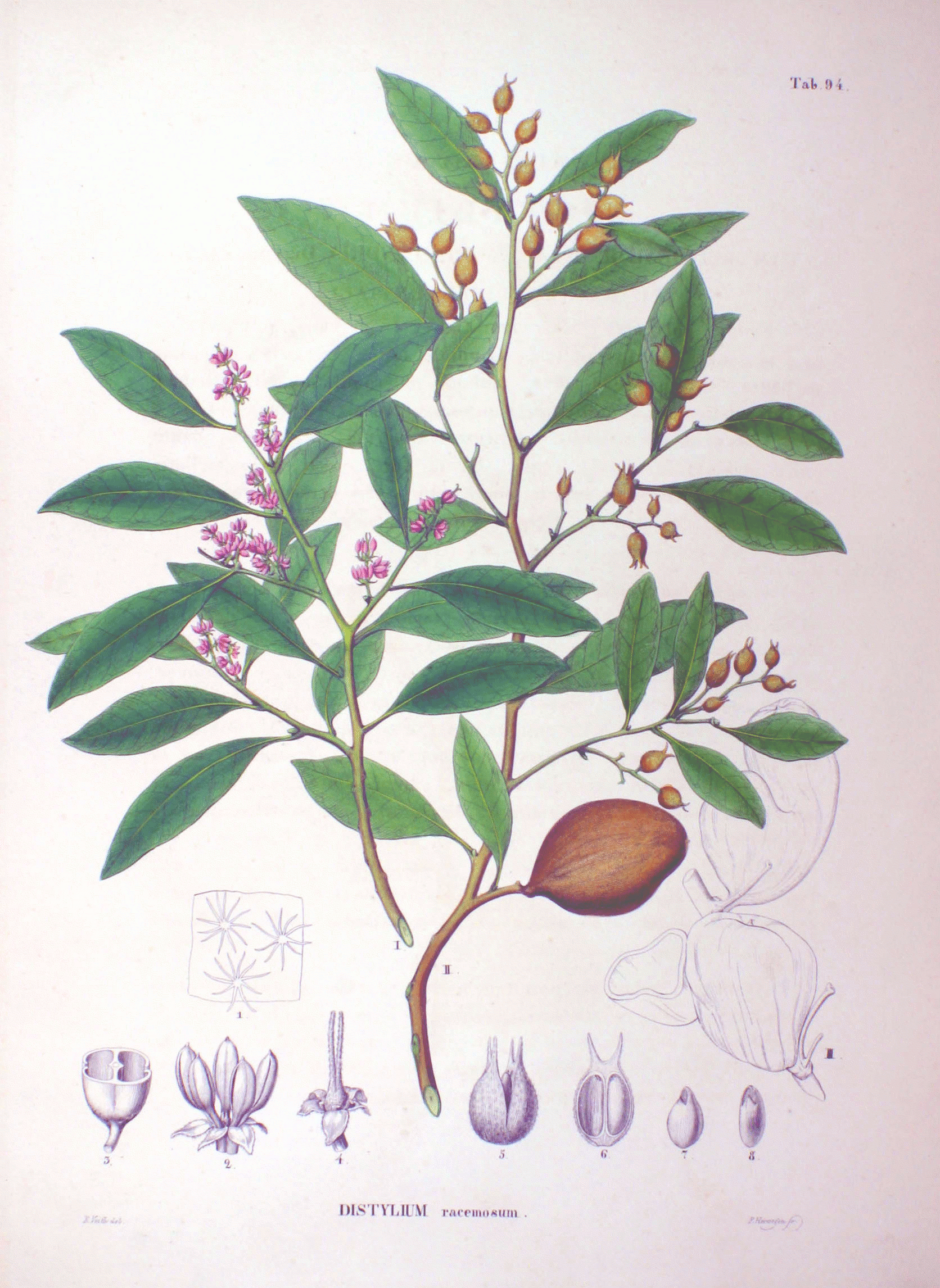
- Botanical illustration

Conservation status
- Least Concern (IUCN 3.1)

Scientific classification
- Kingdom: Plantae
- Clade: Embryophytes
- Clade: Tracheophytes
- Clade: Spermatophytes
- Clade: Angiosperms
- Clade: Eudicots
- Order: Saxifragales
- Family: Hamamelidaceae
- Genus: Distylium
- Species: D. racemosum

Binomial name
- Distylium racemosum Siebold & Zucc.

Synonyms
- Distylium racemosum f. angustifolium (Masam.) H.Ohba

= Distylium racemosum =

Species of flowering plant

Distylium racemosum, the isu tree, is a species of flowering plant in the family Hamamelidaceae. It is native to subtropical eastern Asia; central and southern Japan, the Ryukyu Islands, South Korea (Jeju Island), southeastern China, Taiwan, Hainan, and northern Vietnam. There are a number of cultivars, including 'Guppy' and the variegated 'Akebono'.

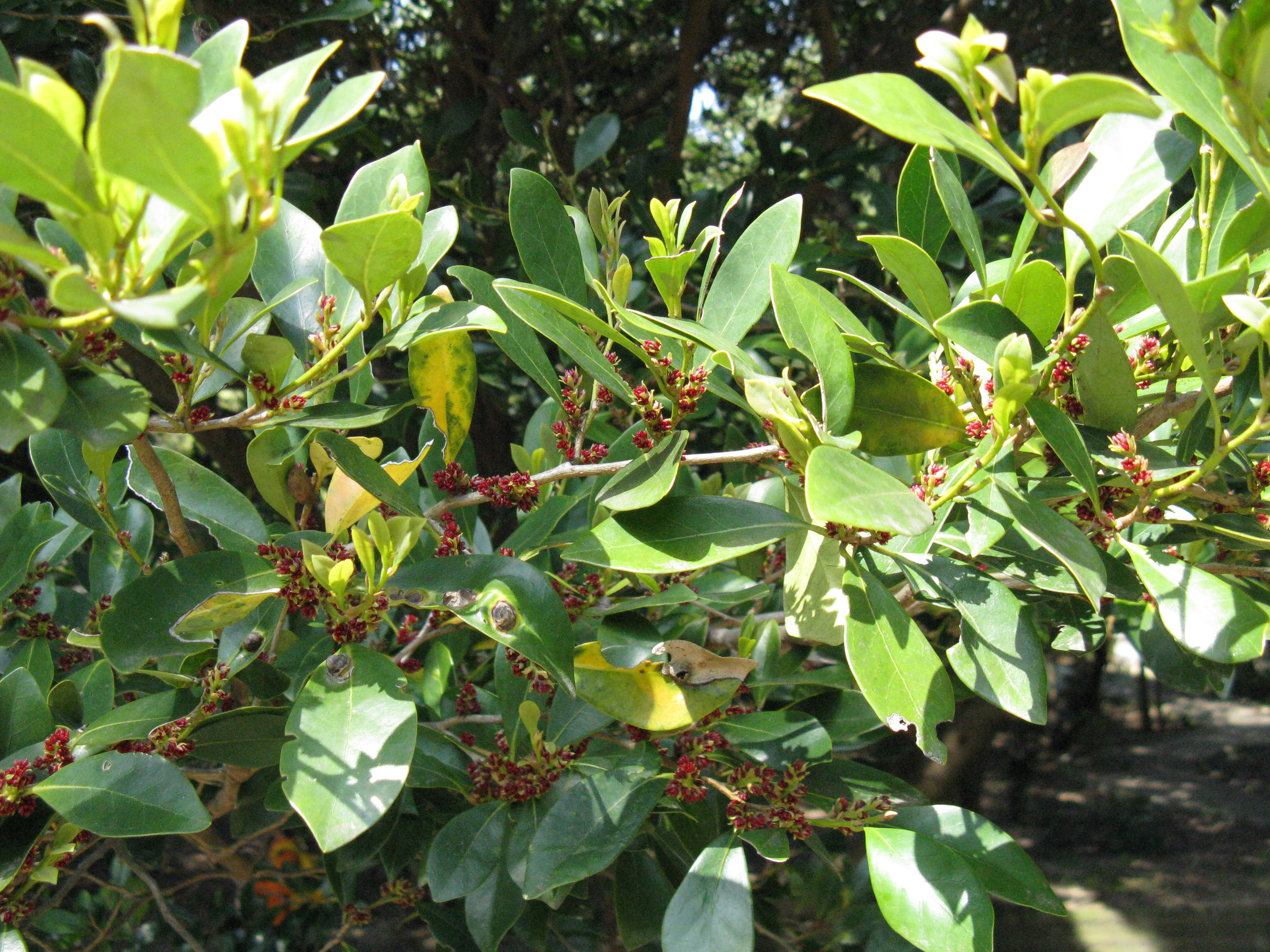
Flowers with leaves

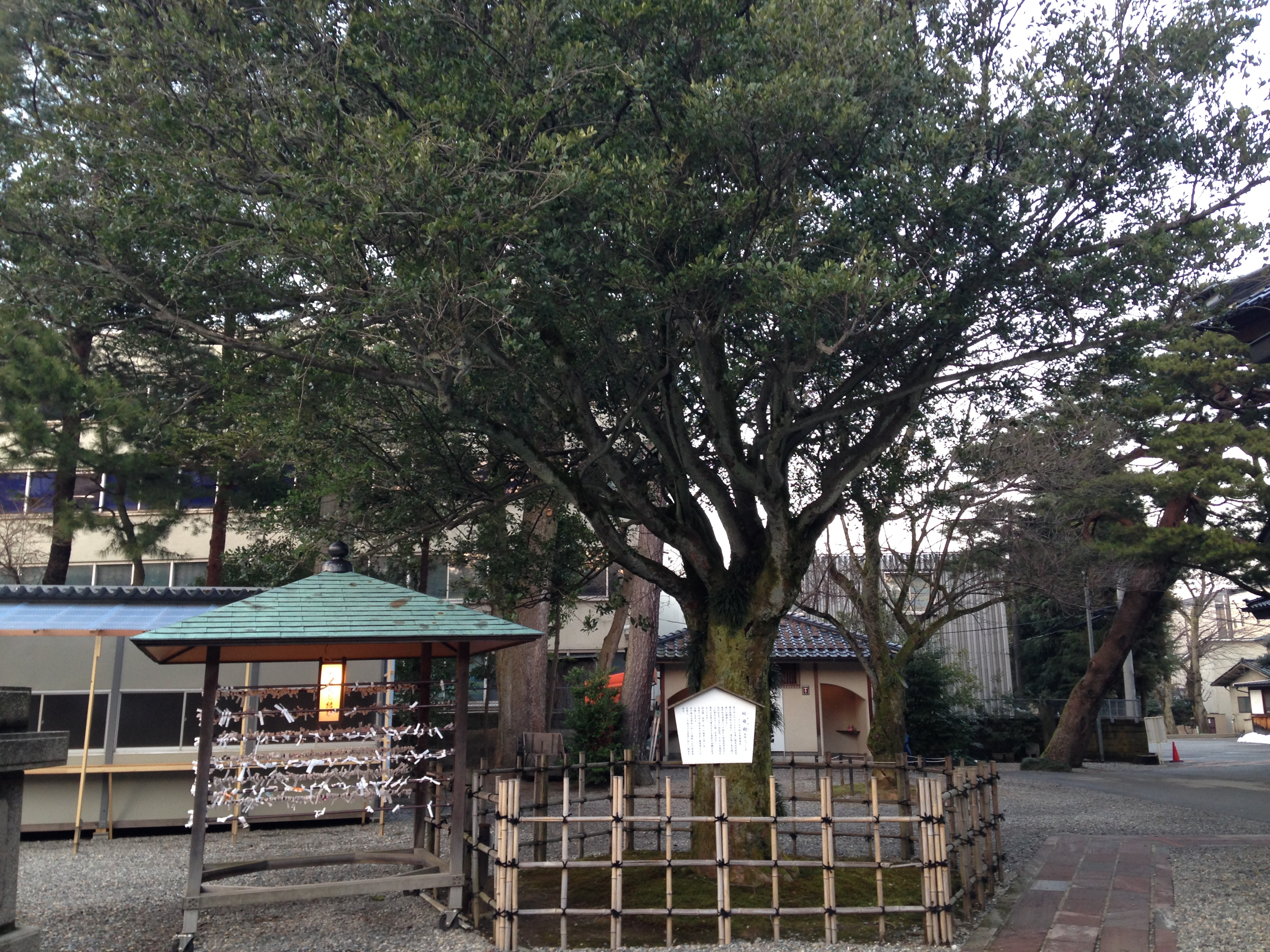
At Oyama Shrine

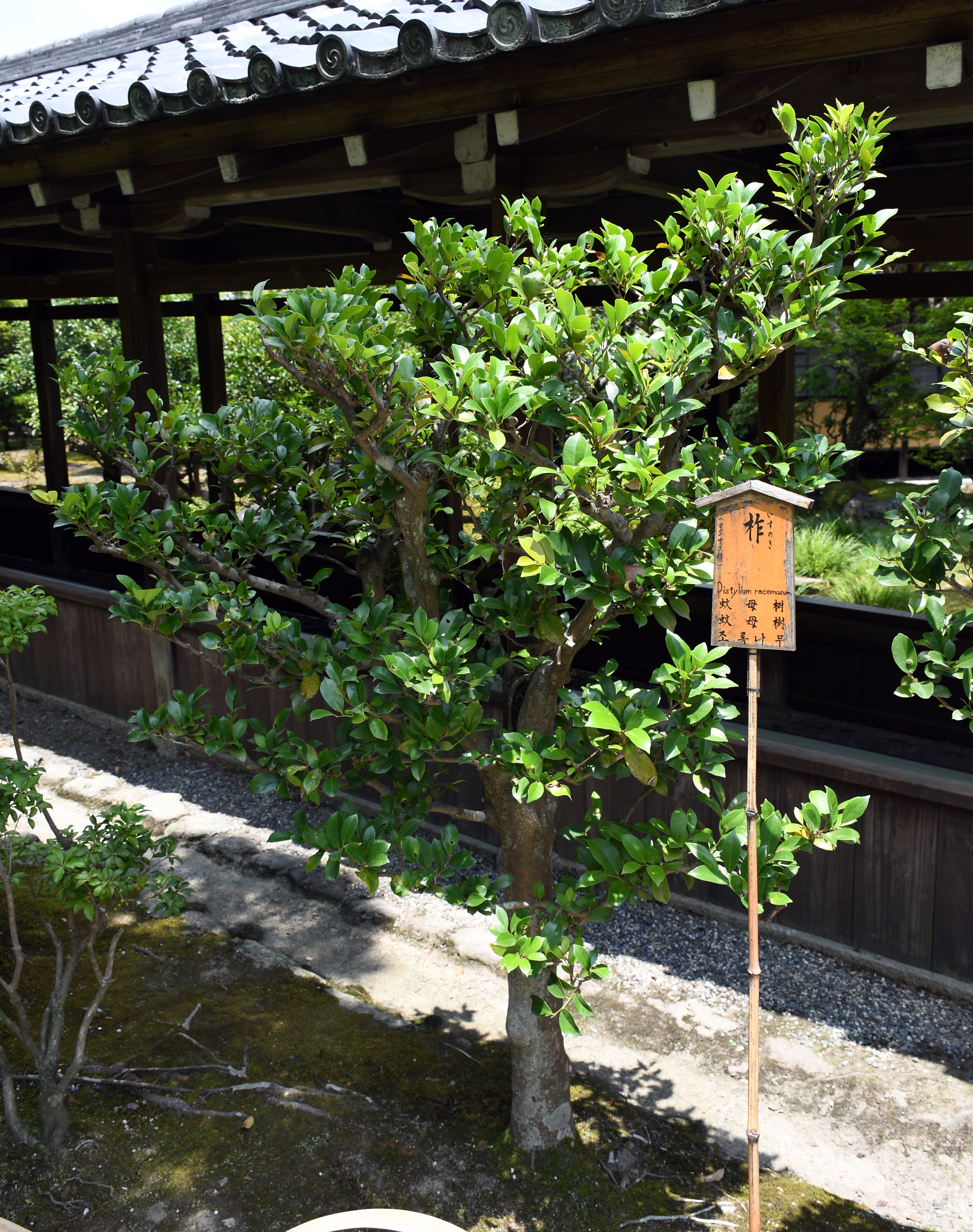
A young individual at a shrine in Japan

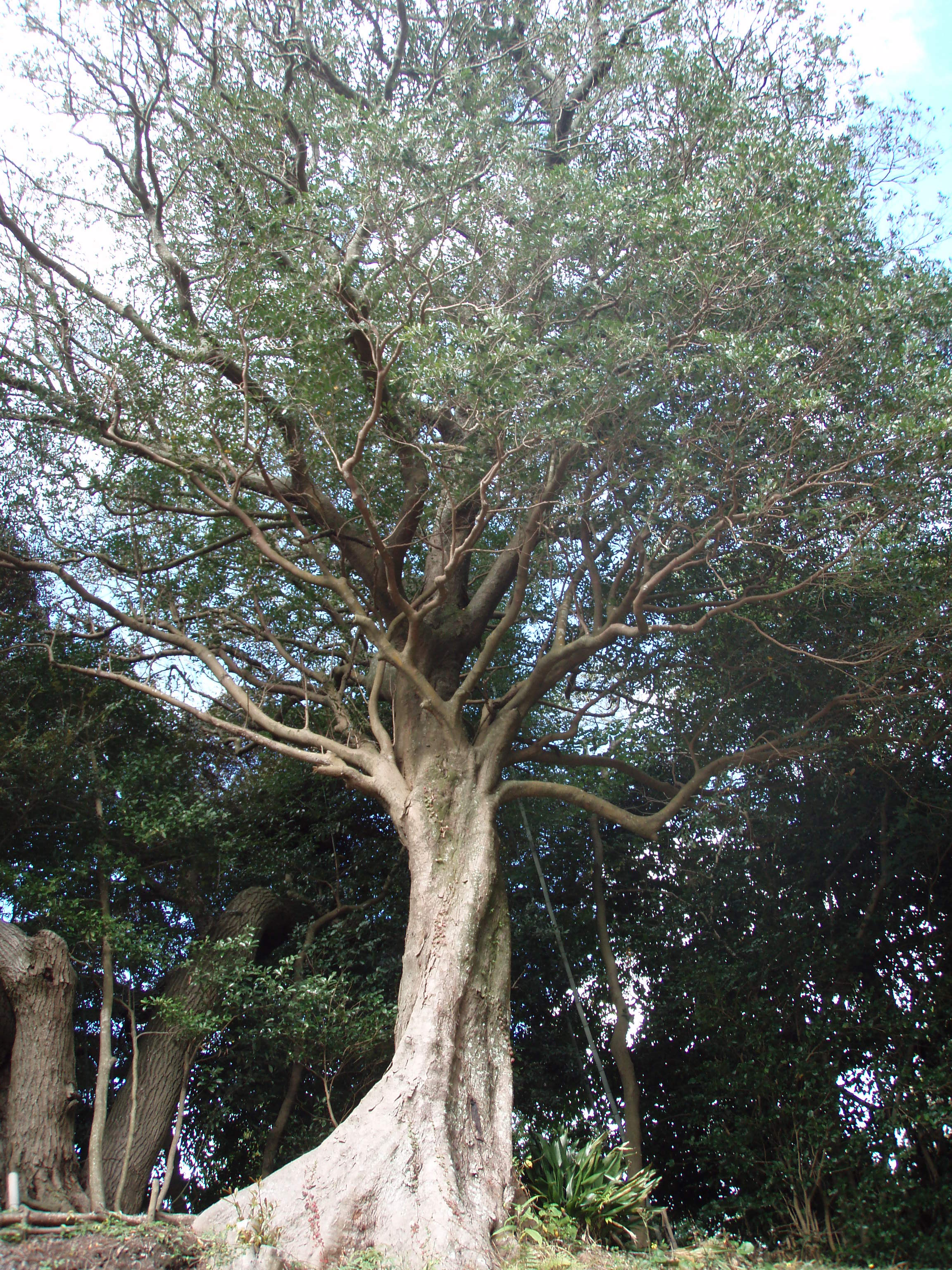
A mature individual
