= Schloss Ueckermünde =

Castle in Germany

Coordinates: 53.7359°N 14.0485°E

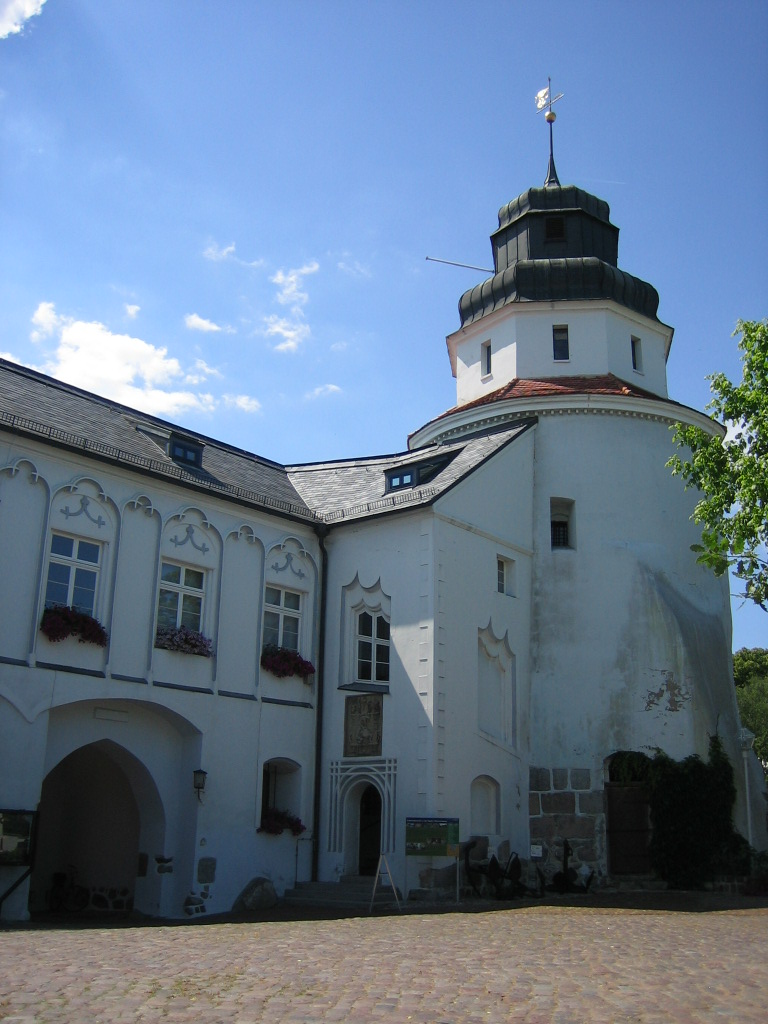
Yard side with passage, Stair tower and keep.

Schloss Ueckermünde is a Schloss in Ueckermünde in Vorpommern-Greifswald, one of the latest buildings in the Pomeranian dukes in Germany. The building was surrounded by a water ditch and accessible over a drawbridge.
