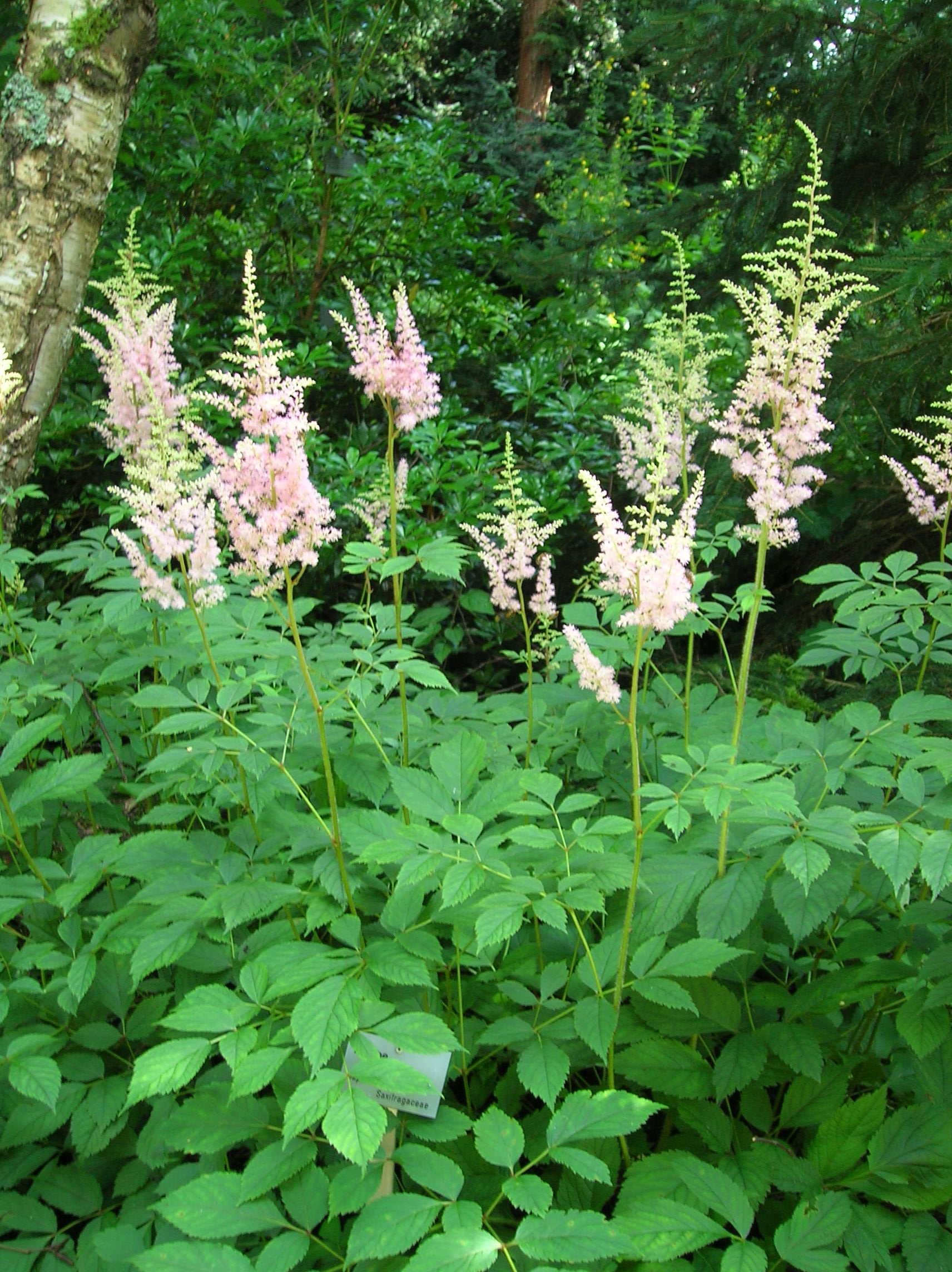

Scientific classification
- Kingdom: Plantae
- Clade: Tracheophytes
- Clade: Angiosperms
- Clade: Eudicots
- Order: Saxifragales
- Family: Saxifragaceae
- Genus: Astilbe
- Species: A. thunbergii

Binomial name
- Astilbe thunbergii (Siebold & Zucc.) Miq.

Synonyms
- List: Astilbe intermedia Knoll; Astilbe perplexipexa Koidz.; Hoteia thunbergii Siebold & Zucc.

= Astilbe thunbergii =

Species of flowering plant

Astilbe thunbergii is a species of flowering plant in the genus Astilbe, native to Japan. Its hybrid cultivar 'Straussenfeder' has gained the Royal Horticultural Society's Award of Garden Merit.

== Varieties ==
The following varieties are currently accepted:

- Astilbe thunbergii var. thunbergii
- Astilbe thunbergii var. kiusiana (H.Hara) H.Hara ex H.Ohba
