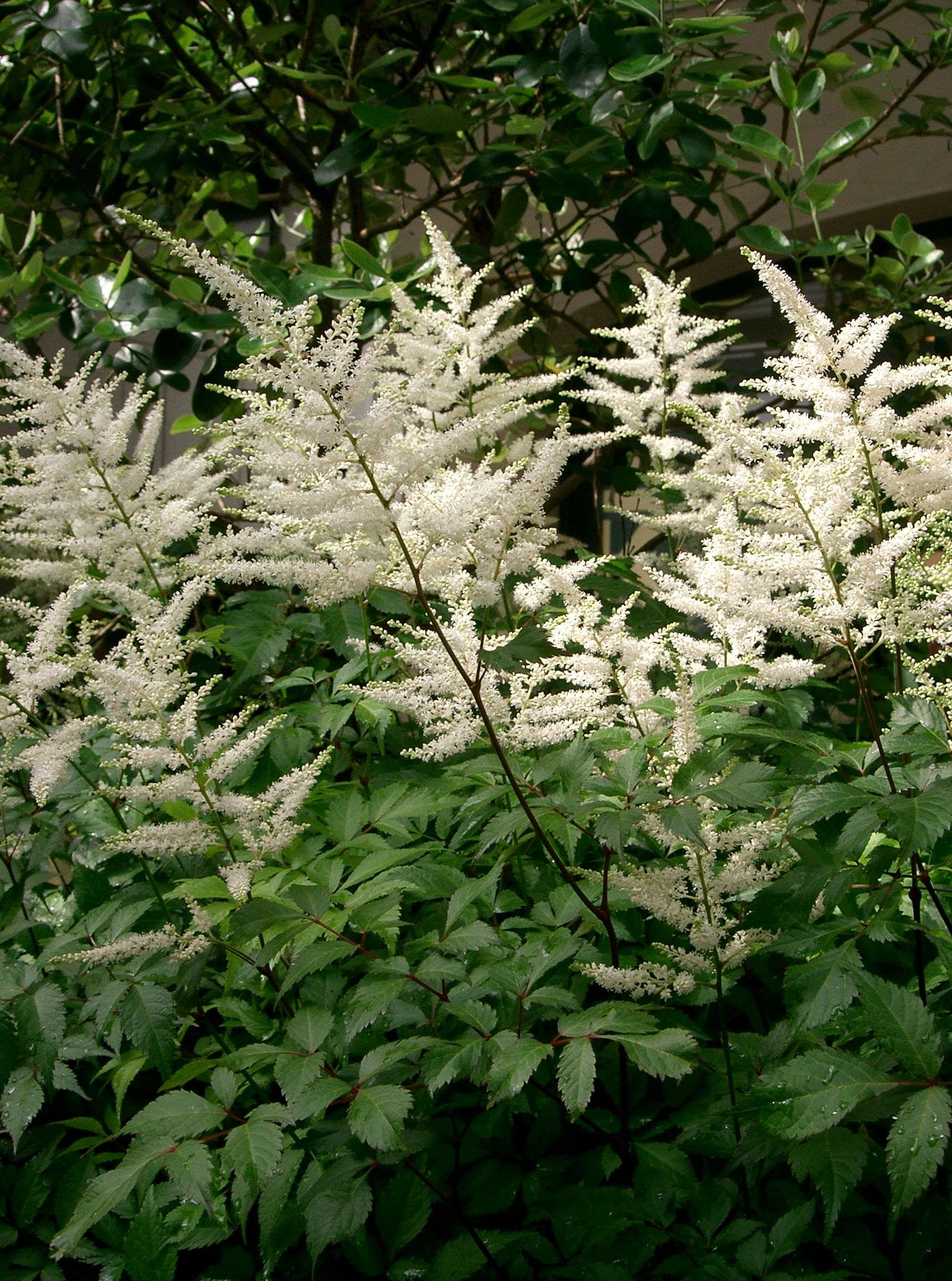

Scientific classification
- Kingdom: Plantae
- Clade: Tracheophytes
- Clade: Angiosperms
- Clade: Eudicots
- Order: Saxifragales
- Family: Saxifragaceae
- Genus: Astilbe
- Species: A. japonica

Binomial name
- Astilbe japonica (C.Morren & Decne.) A.Gray

Synonyms
- List: Astilbe japonica f. pygmaea S.Akiyama; Hoteia barbata Hook.; Hoteia japonica C.Morren & Decne.

= Astilbe japonica =

Species of flowering plant

Astilbe japonica, called false buck's beard, is a species of flowering plant in the genus Astilbe, native to Japan, and introduced in New York State. Its hybrid cultivars 'Deutschland', 'Montgomery', and 'Rheinland' have gained the Royal Horticultural Society's Award of Garden Merit.
