= Astilbe Arendsii Group =

Flowering plant cultivar group

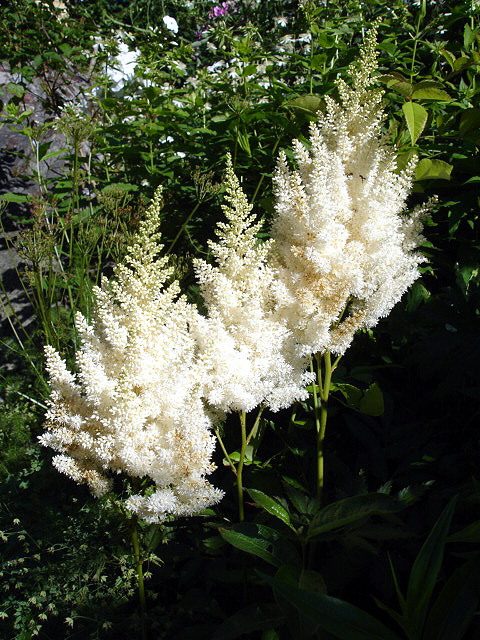
- Astilbe (Arendsii Group) 'Weisse Gloria' in flower
- Genus: Astilbe
- Cultivar group: Arendsii Group

Astilbe Arendsii Group (Astilbe × arendsii) is a cultivar group of complex hybrids with A. astilboides, A. chinensis, A. japonica, A. thunbergii and others. They are all perennial, herbaceous plants with flowers in various shades from white to purplish red.

Numerous cultivars exist, a majority of them produced by breeders in Germany and Holland. The name is derived from the surname of German horticulturist Georg Arends who was responsible for nearly all hybrid cultivars sold in North America.

Invalid names:

- Astilbe ×arendsii Arends
- Astilbe ×hybrida Ievinya & Lusinya

== Other websites ==
- Photos
