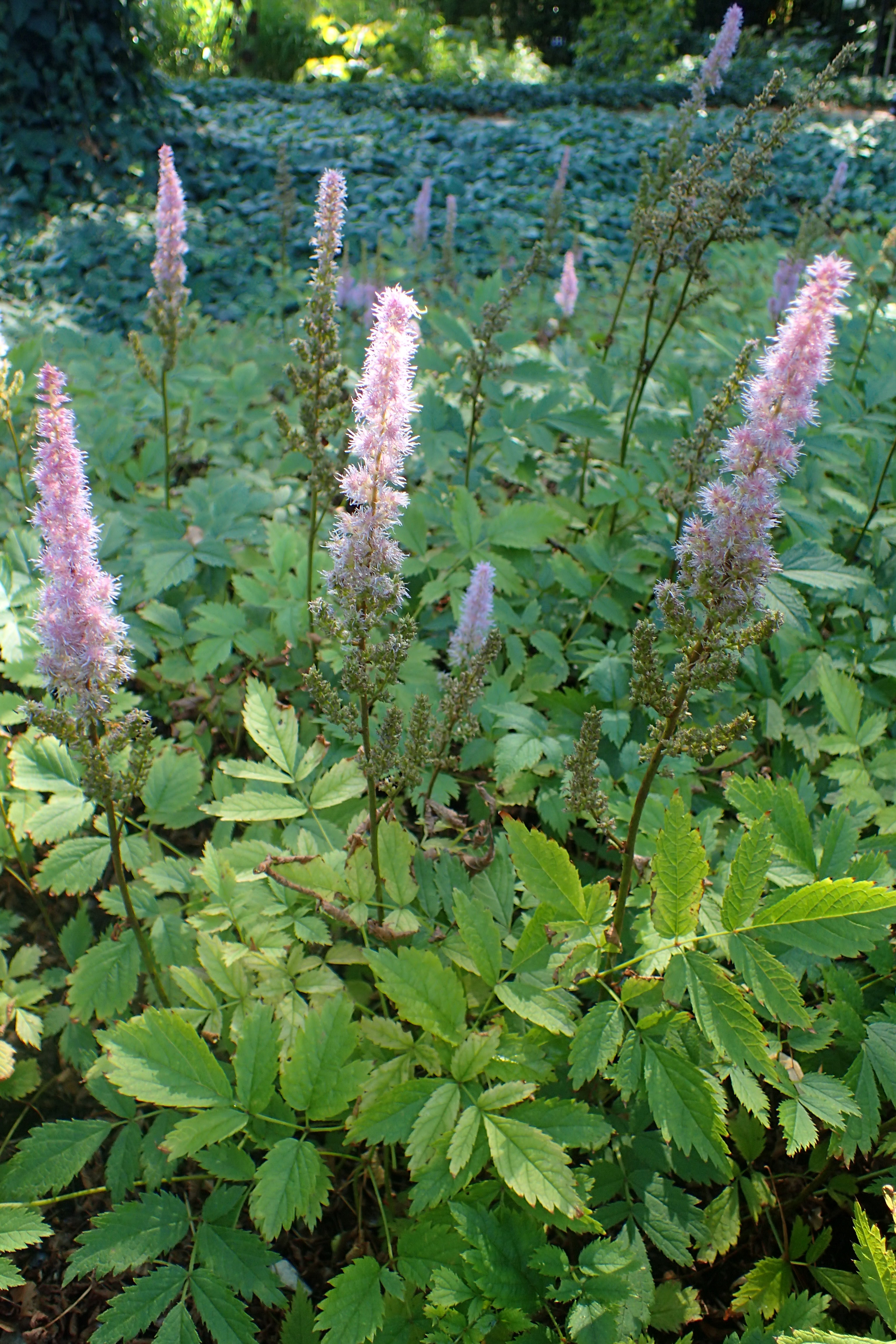

Scientific classification
- Kingdom: Plantae
- Clade: Tracheophytes
- Clade: Angiosperms
- Clade: Eudicots
- Order: Saxifragales
- Family: Saxifragaceae
- Genus: Astilbe
- Species: A. chinensis

Binomial name
- Astilbe chinensis (Maxim.) Franch. & Sav.

Synonyms
- Homotypic Synonyms: Hoteia chinensis Maxim.; Heterotypic Synonyms: Astilbe chinensis f. albiflora Nakai; Astilbe chinensis var. davidi Franch.; Astilbe chinensis var. seoulensis Nakai; Astilbe davidi (Franch.) L.Henry; Astilbe rubra f. albiflora (Nakai) M.Kim

= Astilbe chinensis =

Chinese astilbe

Species of plant

Astilbe chinensis, commonly known as false goat's beard, tall false-buck's-beard or Chinese astilbe, is a species of flowering plant in the saxifrage family, Saxifragaceae. It is a perennial herb that grows near shaded streams and rivers. It is also commonly grown in shade gardens.

== Taxonomy ==
The binomial name of Chinese astilbe is Astilbe chinensis. The genus name, Astilbe, from the Greek words for "without" and "brightness", refers to the dullness of leaves of some species, while the specific epithet refers to the plant's Chinese origin.

Chinese astilbe was originally described as Hoteia chinensis by C. J. Maximowiez in 1859. In 1875, Adrien René Franchet and Ludovic Savatier transferred it to the genus Astilbe. Whether A. chinensis and A. rubra were distinct species or synonyms was a controversial issue for botanists throughout the 20th century, with current consensus favoring the latter interpretation. The plant once known as Astilbe davidii (Franch.) is today regarded as a variety of A. chinensis. Other varieties include A. chinensis var. divaricata (Nakai) and A. chinensis var. pumila (auct.).

== Description ==
Astilbe chinensis is a herbaceous perennial growing in clumps. The species reaches a height of 45–90 centimetres (18–35 in). The leaves are predominantly basal and ternately compound with sharply-toothed (often biserrated) leaflets. Most leaflets are elliptic to oval in shape and hairy. The mounds of leaves resemble ferns. Flowers are minuscule and form panicles on thin, erect or arching stems.

== Distribution and habitat ==
Chinese astilbe was discovered by Richard Maack on 6 July 1855 in the south of modern-day Amur Oblast of Russia and the Chinese region Heilongjiang, and by Leopold von Schrenck the following year. The natural range of Chinese astilbe is Eastern China, Japanese archipelago, and Korea, at altitudes between 400 and 3600 meters. It is found along shaded streams and rivers as well as within and along the margins of damp, open broadleaf forests.

== Cultivation ==
Chinese astilbe is prized for its attractive foliage, plume-like inflorescence in the summer, and dried seed heads afterwards. In 1902, the Journal of the Royal Horticultural Society described it as "the most important hardy perennial introduced during the past few years". Chinese astilbe is usually planted in woodland gardens and shaded parts of herbaceous borders or cottage gardens as groundcover or edging plant. The plant requires partial to full shade, and grows best in soil which is well-drained and rich in organic material. While more tolerant of drought and exposure to direct sunlight than its congeners, the soil must never dry out. Generally resistant to pathogens and herbivores, most problems are caused by high temperatures and drought.

The following cultivars have gained the Royal Horticultural Society's Award of Garden Merit:

- A. chinensis var. pumila - mauve
- A. chinensis var. taqueti 'Purpurlanze' - red/purple
- A. chinensis var. taqueti 'Superba' - rose/mauve

== Gallery ==
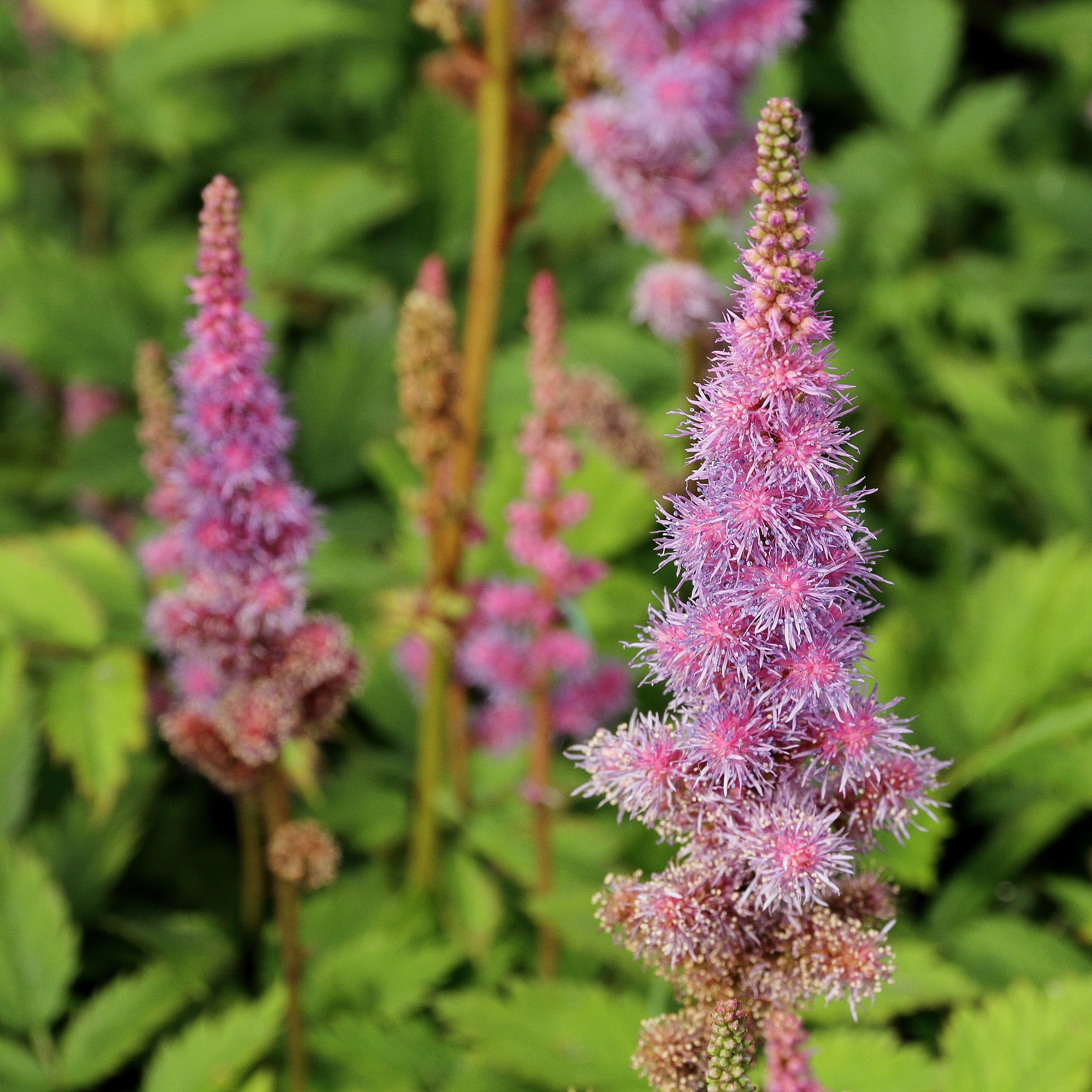
Inflorescence

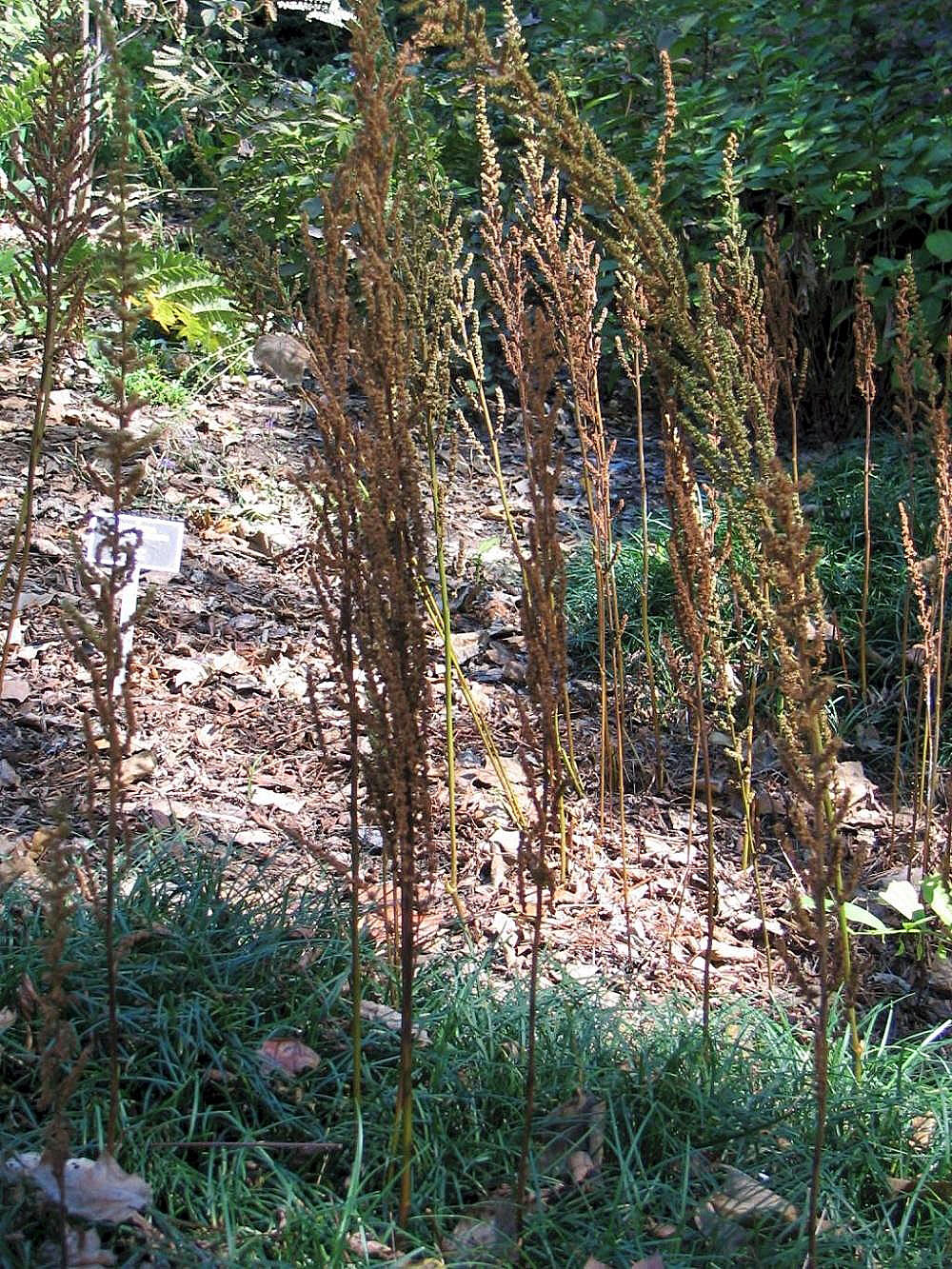
Dried seed heads

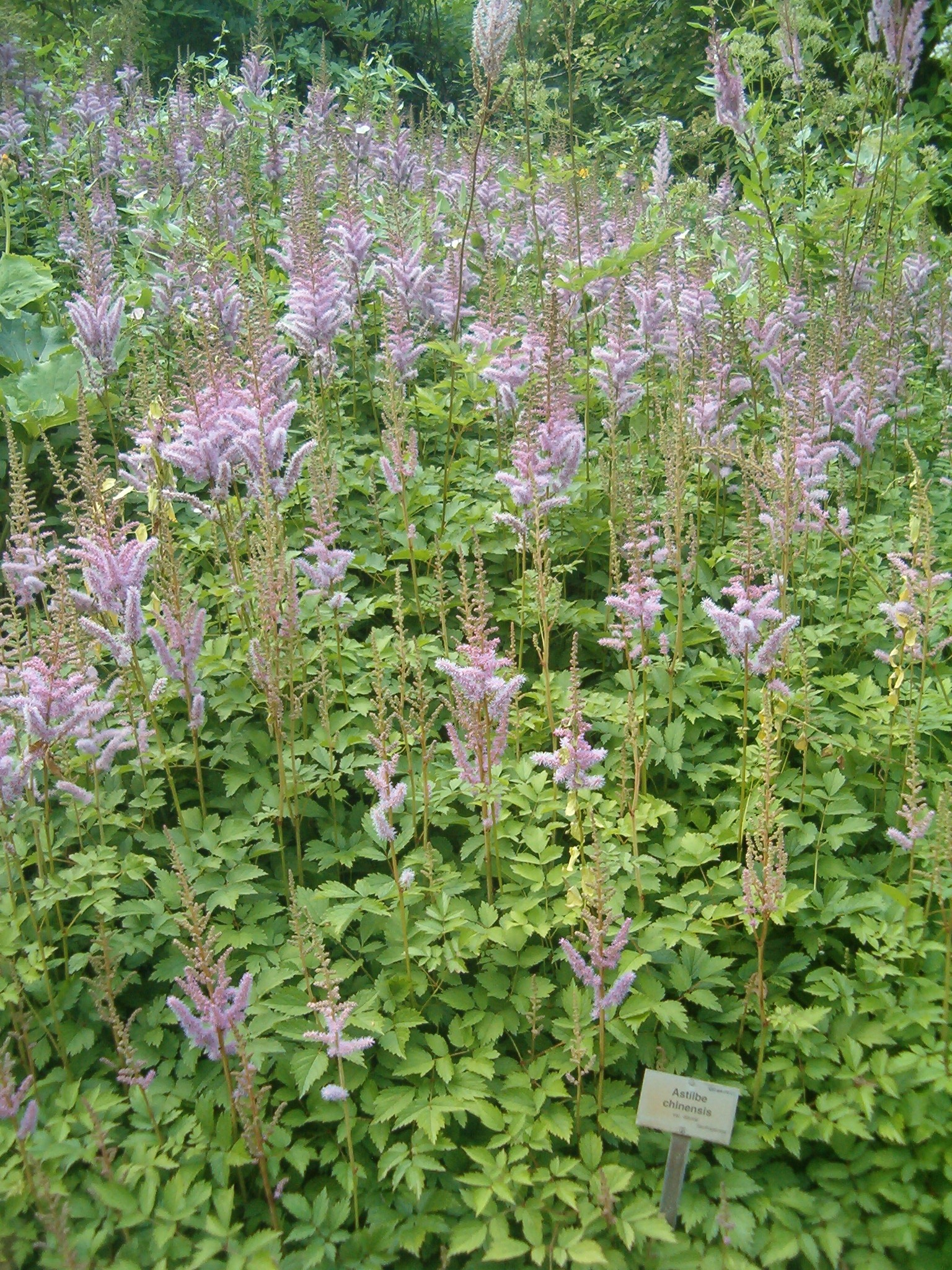
Mound
