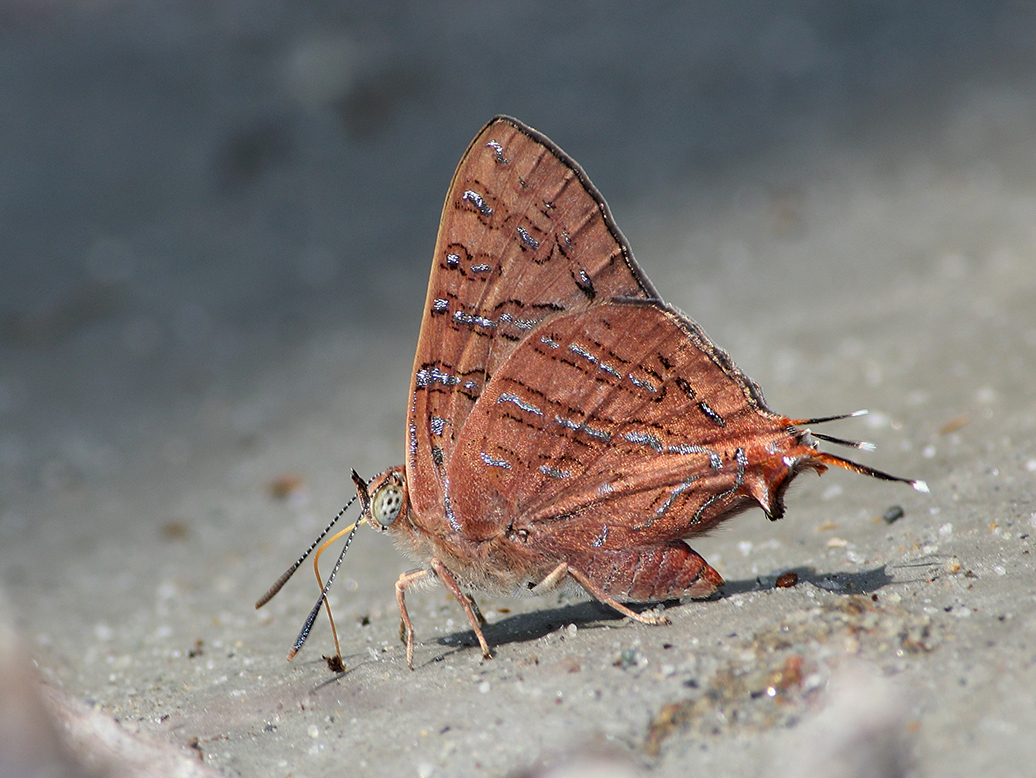

Scientific classification
- Kingdom: Animalia
- Phylum: Arthropoda
- Clade: Pancrustacea
- Class: Insecta
- Order: Lepidoptera
- Family: Lycaenidae
- Genus: Cigaritis
- Species: C. elima

Binomial name
- Cigaritis elima (Moore, 1877)

Synonyms
- Aphnaeus elima Moore, 1877; Aphnaeus lunulifera Moore, 1879; Aphnaeus trifurcata Moore, 1882; Aphnaeus khurdanus Moore, 1884; Spindasis elima (Moore); Winter-Blyth, 1982

= Cigaritis elima =

Scarce shot silverline

Species of butterfly

Cigaritis elima, the scarce shot silverline, is a species of lycaenid or blue butterfly found in Sri Lanka and India. The species was first described by Frederic Moore in 1877.

== Description ==
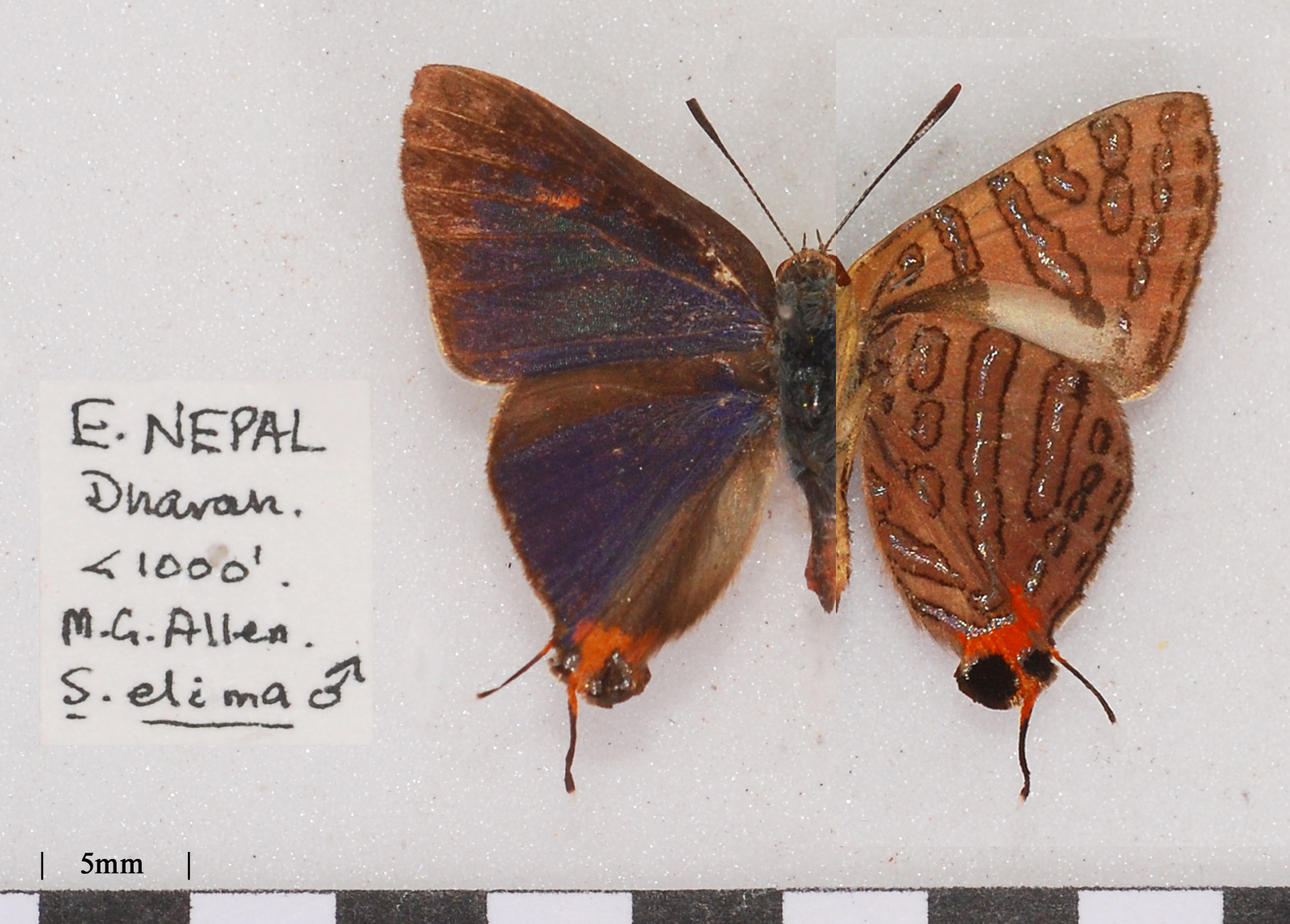
Male

Wings acute at apex; anal lobe prominently distended.

Male: Upperside brown, posterior half of fore wing and middle of hind wing glossed with smalt-blue; fore wing with a not very prominent subapical reddish patch, in which are two brown spots; abdominal margin pale testaceous; anal lobe reddish testaceous.
Female: Brown; fore wing with large triangular maculated red patch; hind wing with reddish discal streak and anal lobe. Underside dull pale testaceous; transverse spots and bands very pale, being defined only by outer margins, each traversed by a silver streak; no marginal row of dots.

Most nearly allied to Cigaritis ictis, from which it may be known by the less prominent apical red patch, the difference in colour and less apparent markings of the underside.

— Frederic Moore, Descriptions of Asiatic Diurnal Lepidoptera

== Subspecies ==
Subspecies of Cigaritis elima:-

- Cigaritis elima elima Moore, 1877 – India
- Cigaritis elima uniformis Moore, 1882 – Kashmir
- Cigaritis elima fairliei
- Cigaritis elima ictina
