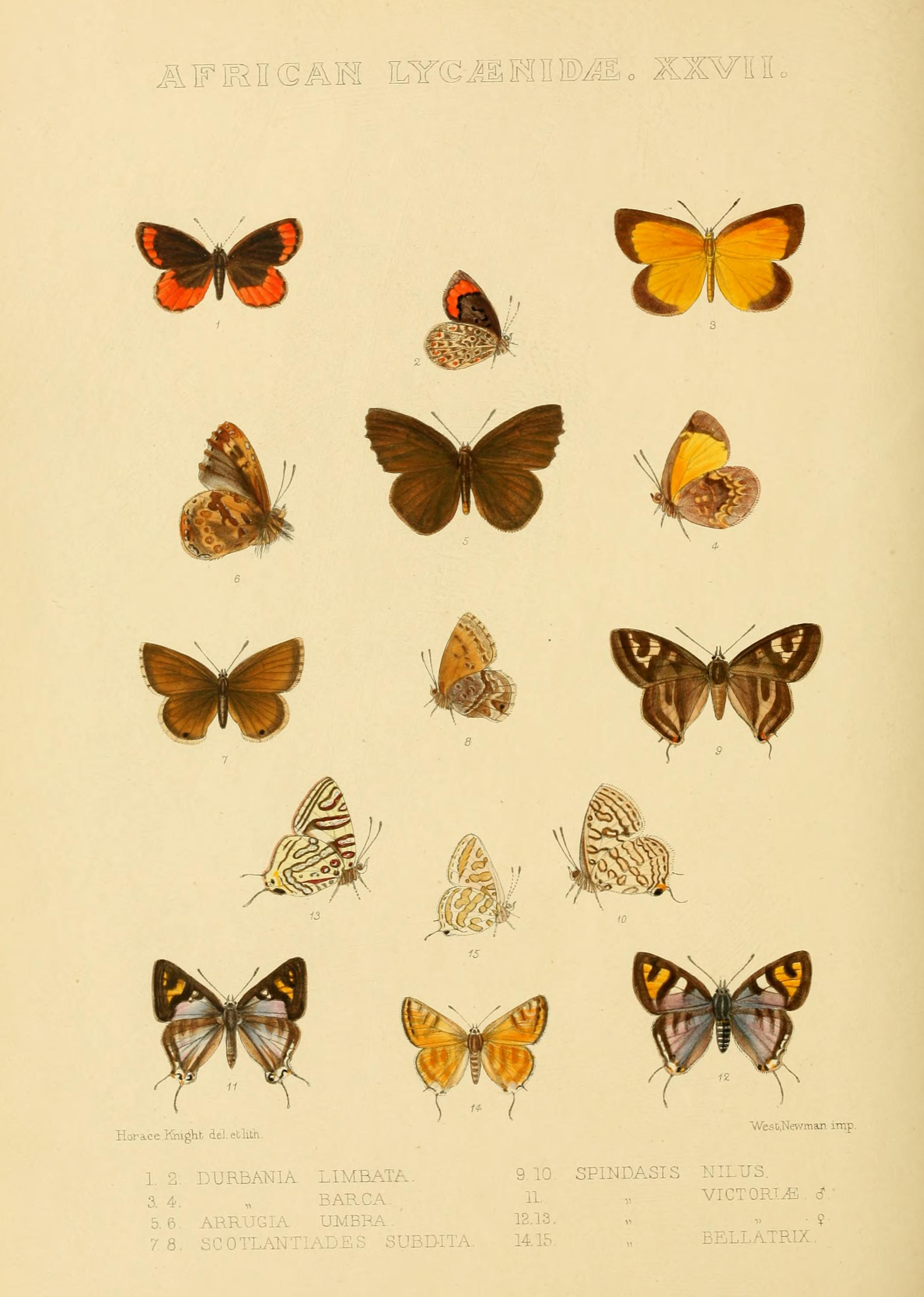
- Figure 11 male, figures 12 and 13 female

Scientific classification
- Kingdom: Animalia
- Phylum: Arthropoda
- Clade: Pancrustacea
- Class: Insecta
- Order: Lepidoptera
- Family: Lycaenidae
- Genus: Cigaritis
- Species: C. victoriae

Binomial name
- Cigaritis victoriae (Butler, 1884)

Synonyms
- Aphnaeus victoriae Butler, 1884; Spindasis victoriae

= Cigaritis victoriae =

Species of butterfly

Cigaritis victoriae, the Victoria's bar or Victoria silverline, is a butterfly in the family Lycaenidae. It is found in southern and eastern Kenya, Tanzania, Malawi, Mozambique and eastern Zimbabwe. The habitat consists of savanna.

Both sexes feed from flowers. Adults are probably on wing year-round, but are most common in spring and autumn.

The larvae feed on Acacia, Cassia and Mundulea species, as well as Ximenia americana. They are attended by ants.
