= Cigaritis nyassae =

Nyassa silverline

Scientific classification
- Kingdom: Animalia
- Phylum: Arthropoda
- Clade: Pancrustacea
- Class: Insecta
- Order: Lepidoptera
- Family: Lycaenidae
- Genus: Cigaritis
- Species: C. nyassae

Binomial name
- Cigaritis nyassae (Butler, 1884)

Synonyms
- Aphnaeus nyassae Butler, 1884; Spindasis nyassae

Species of butterfly

Cigaritis nyassae, the Nyassa silverline, is a butterfly in the family Lycaenidae. It is found in Uganda, western Kenya, Tanzania, Malawi, Mozambique and possibly Zimbabwe.

The larvae feed on Acacia stenocarpa, Entada abyssinica and Mundulea species.
