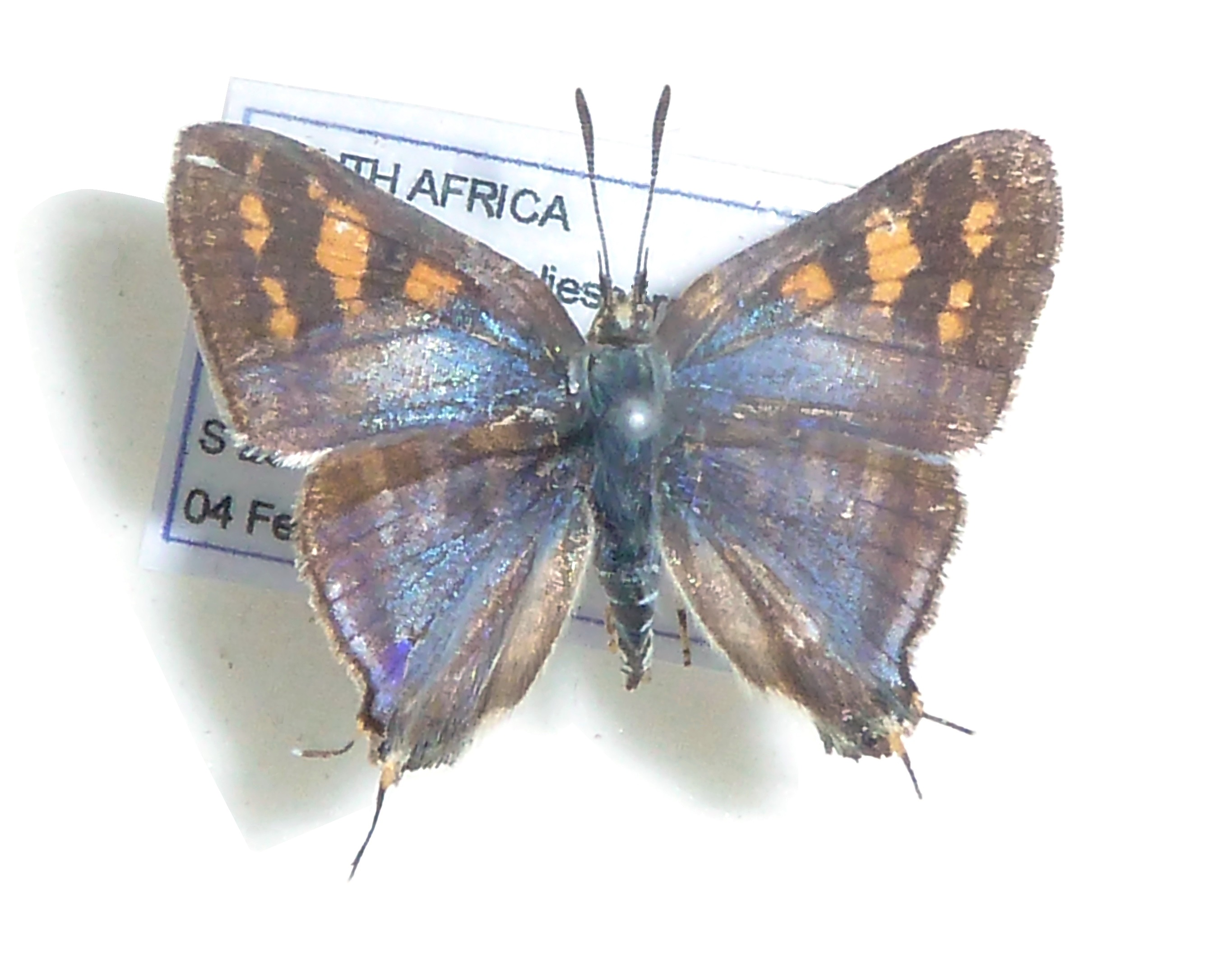
- Specimen from the Magaliesberg

Scientific classification
- Kingdom: Animalia
- Phylum: Arthropoda
- Clade: Pancrustacea
- Class: Insecta
- Order: Lepidoptera
- Family: Lycaenidae
- Genus: Cigaritis
- Species: C. ella

Binomial name
- Cigaritis ella (Hewitson, [1865])

Synonyms
- Aphnaeus ella Hewitson, [1865]; Spindasis ella; Aphnaeus chaka Wallengren, 1875; Spindasis ella f. barnesi Stempffer, 1953; Spindasis junodi d'Abrera, 1980

= Cigaritis ella =

Species of butterfly

Cigaritis ella, the Ella's bar, is a butterfly of the family Lycaenidae. It is found from South Africa to the coast of eastern Kenya. In South Africa it is found from the Eastern Cape along the coast to KwaZulu-Natal, then inland to Eswatini, the Free State, Mpumalanga, Gauteng, Limpopo, North West and Northern Cape.

The wingspan is 21–24 mm for males and 25–30 mm for females. Adults are on wing year-round with peaks from August to October and from March to July.

The larvae feed on Ximenia afra. The larvae hide in crevices and under the bark of their host plant.
