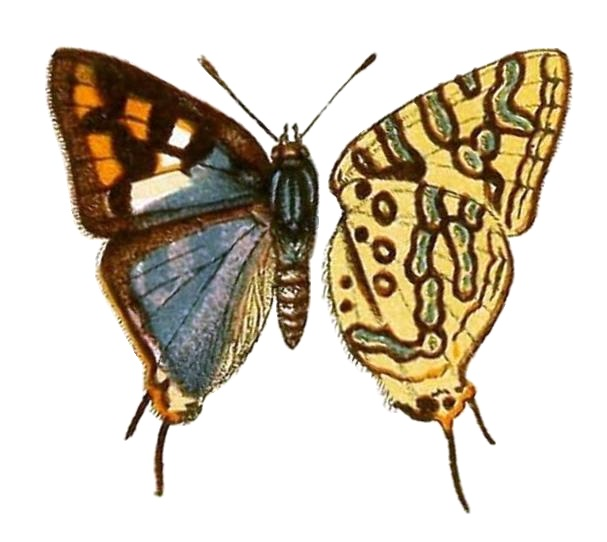
- male

Scientific classification
- Kingdom: Animalia
- Phylum: Arthropoda
- Clade: Pancrustacea
- Class: Insecta
- Order: Lepidoptera
- Family: Lycaenidae
- Genus: Cigaritis
- Species: C. trimeni

Binomial name
- Cigaritis trimeni (Neave, 1910)

Synonyms
- Spindasis trimeni Neave, 1910; Spindasis trimeni congolanus Dufrane, 1954

= Cigaritis trimeni =

Species of butterfly

Cigaritis trimeni is a butterfly in the family Lycaenidae. It is found in Angola, the Democratic Republic of the Congo, Tanzania, Malawi and Zambia. The habitat consists of savanna.

== Subspecies ==
- Cigaritis trimeni trimeni (Zambia, northern Malawi, western Tanzania)
- Cigaritis trimeni congolanus (Dufrane, 1954) (Angola, Democratic Republic of the Congo: Sankuru and Lualaba)

== Etymology ==
The name honours Roland Trimen.
