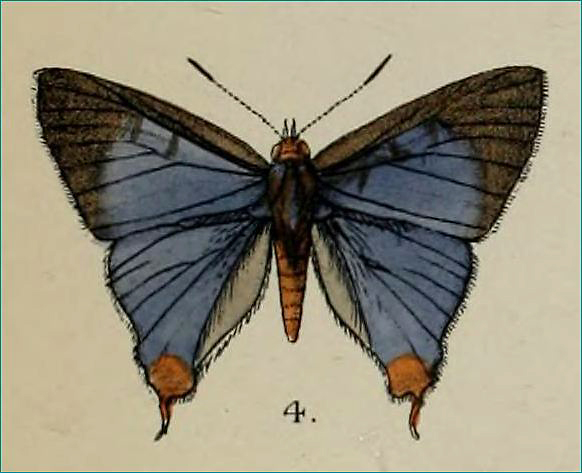

Scientific classification
- Kingdom: Animalia
- Phylum: Arthropoda
- Clade: Pancrustacea
- Class: Insecta
- Order: Lepidoptera
- Family: Lycaenidae
- Genus: Cigaritis
- Species: C. abnormis

Binomial name
- Cigaritis abnormis (Moore, [1884])

Synonyms
- Aphnaeus abnormis Moore, [1884]; Spindasis abnormis (Moore, [1884])

= Cigaritis abnormis =

Abnormal silverline

Species of butterfly

Cigaritis abnormis, the abnormal silverline, is a species of lycaenid or blue butterfly found in south India and Pakistan.

== Description ==
Male. Upperside dull greyish-violet, with some violet gloss in certain lights. Forewing with the costa above the sub-costal vein and the apical space broadly, blackish-brown, this colour continued down the outer margin and ending narrowly at the hinder angle. Hindwing with the abdominal space pale grey, almost whitish, the base and outer parts of the wing smeared with dark grey, anal patch dull greyish-orange, no spots visible; tails short, dull orange, tipped with white and edged with black. Cilia black, with white tips. Underside greyish ochreous, bands very narrow, indicated by their ochreous-brown linear edgings, their centres with silvery scales. Forewing with a dot in the cell, a bar across the end, extending to the costa, a band from the middle of the costa to the middle of the interno-median interspace, almost touching the lower end of a very indistinct sub-marginal luuular series, a sub-apical band from the costa of two pairs oi very indistinct small spots. Hindwing with a medial straight band which abruptly bends inwards above the anal lobe and runs to the abdominal margin, and has another similar short line above it, a discal very thin band which is irregularly outwardly curved. Marginal line of both wings grey. Antennae black, with white segmental dots at its sides; frons orange-grey, top of head rufous-orange; body above and below concolorous with the wings. Female. Upperside paler than in the male and more violet in colour, some blackish suffusion on the costa, apical and outer marginal band narrow and inwardly diffuse, a blackish bar at the end of the cell. Underside as in the male.

— Charles Swinhoe, Lepidoptera Indica. Vol. IX

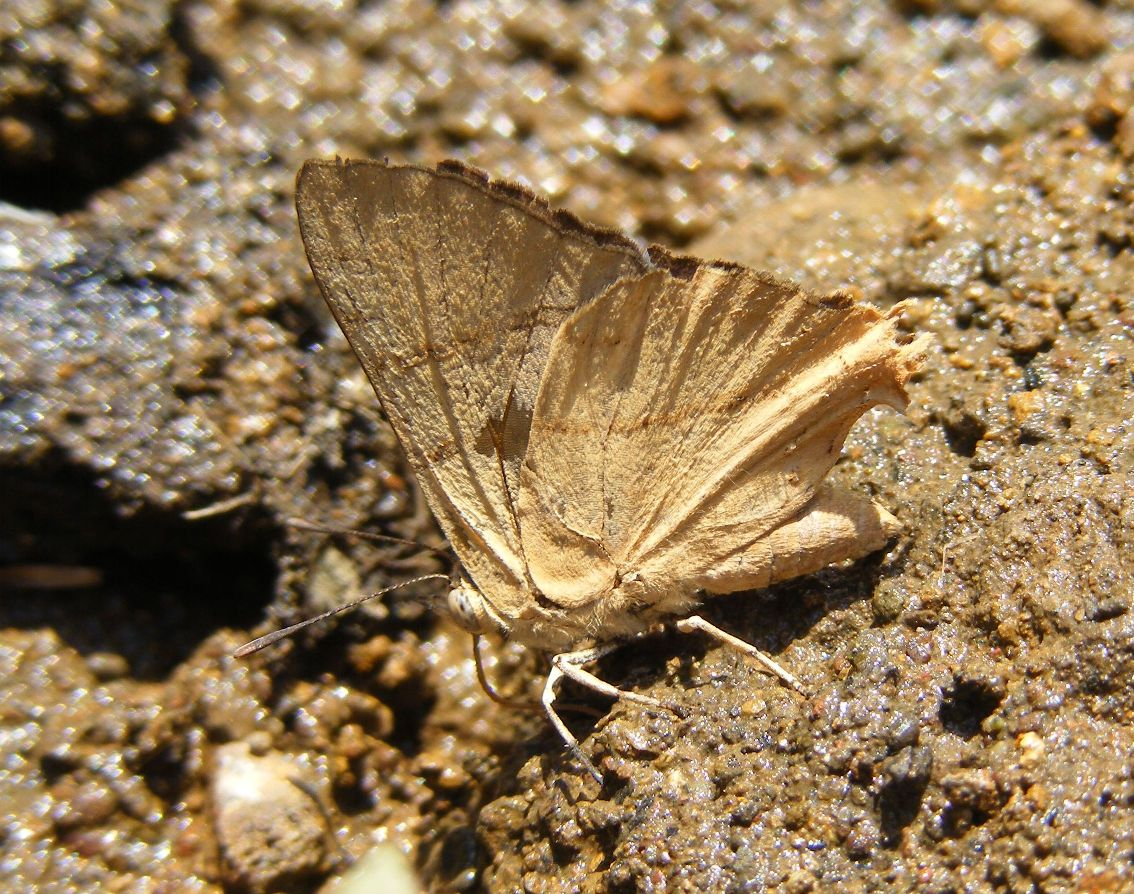

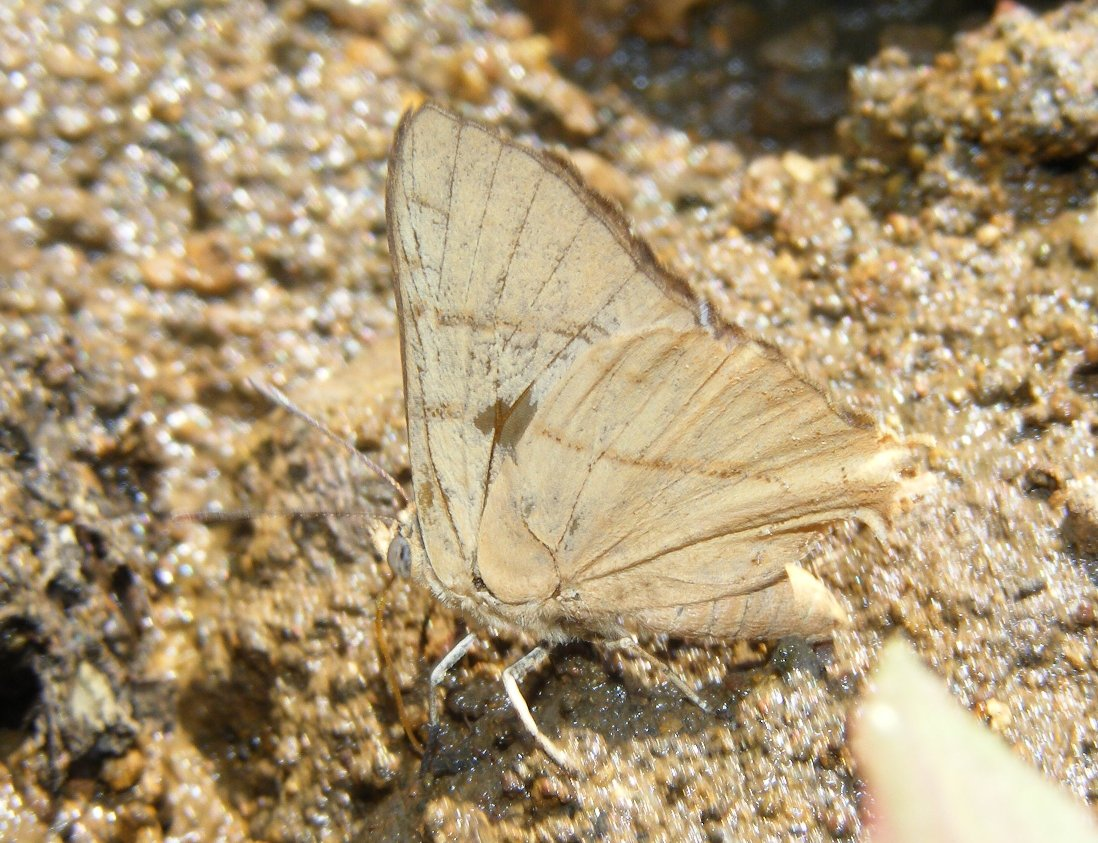
