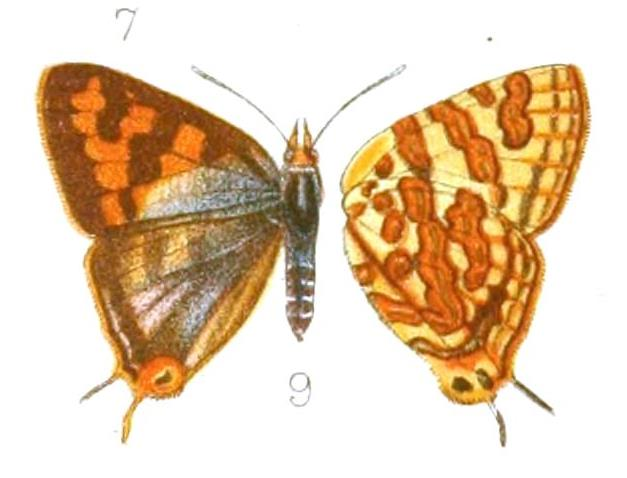

Scientific classification
- Kingdom: Animalia
- Phylum: Arthropoda
- Clade: Pancrustacea
- Class: Insecta
- Order: Lepidoptera
- Family: Lycaenidae
- Genus: Cigaritis
- Species: C. homeyeri

Binomial name
- Cigaritis homeyeri (Dewitz, 1887)

Synonyms
- Aphnaeus homeyeri Dewitz, 1887; Spindasis homeyeri; Spindasis kallimon Druce, 1905; Spindasis homeyeri f. fracta Stempffer, 1948

= Cigaritis homeyeri =

Homeyer's bar

Species of butterfly

Cigaritis homeyeri, the Homeyer's bar or Homeyer's silverline, is a lycaenid butterfly that is native to the Afrotropics. Adults are on wing year-round with distinct wet- and dry-season forms.

== Range ==
It is found in Cameroon, Gabon, the Republic of the Congo, Angola, the Democratic Republic of the Congo (Kinshasa, Equateur, Lualaba, Lomami, Shaba and Maniema), Uganda, Kenya, Tanzania, Malawi, Zambia, Zimbabwe, Mozambique and Namibia.

== Habitat and food plants ==
The habitat consists of grassy savannah. The larvae feed on Acacia species.

== Etymology ==
The name honours Alexander von Homeyer.
