= Cigaritis nairobiensis =

Scientific classification
- Kingdom: Animalia
- Phylum: Arthropoda
- Clade: Pancrustacea
- Class: Insecta
- Order: Lepidoptera
- Family: Lycaenidae
- Genus: Cigaritis
- Species: C. nairobiensis

Binomial name
- Cigaritis nairobiensis (Sharpe, 1904)

Synonyms
- Spindasis nairobiensis Sharpe, 1904

Species of butterfly

Cigaritis nairobiensis is a butterfly in the family Lycaenidae. It is found in Kenya, Tanzania and the Democratic Republic of the Congo (Shaba).

The larvae feed on Rhus villosa.
