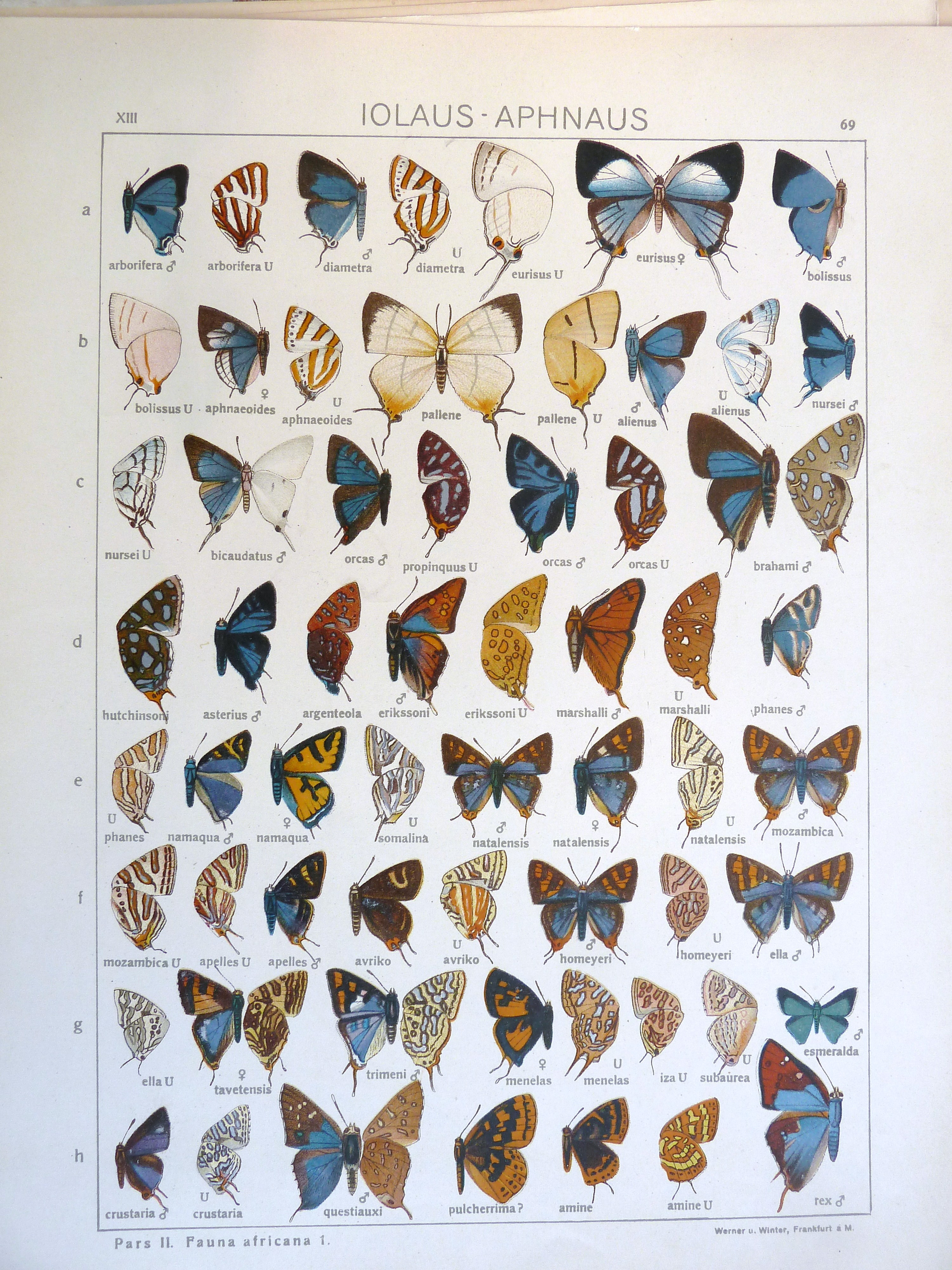
- Seitz Fauna Africana Taf 69 (line f)

Scientific classification
- Kingdom: Animalia
- Phylum: Arthropoda
- Clade: Pancrustacea
- Class: Insecta
- Order: Lepidoptera
- Family: Lycaenidae
- Genus: Cigaritis
- Species: C. avriko

Binomial name
- Cigaritis avriko (Karsch, 1893)

Synonyms
- Aphnaeus avriko Karsch, 1893; Spindasis avriko; Spindasis banyoana Bethune-Baker, 1926

= Cigaritis avriko =

Fine silverline

Species of butterfly

Cigaritis avriko, the fine silverline, is a butterfly in the family Lycaenidae. It is found in Guinea (the Nimba Range), Sierra Leone (the Loma Mountains), southern Burkina Faso, Togo, Nigeria, Cameroon, Uganda, western Kenya and Ethiopia. The habitat consists of savanna.
