= Cigaritis baghirmii =

Scientific classification
- Kingdom: Animalia
- Phylum: Arthropoda
- Clade: Pancrustacea
- Class: Insecta
- Order: Lepidoptera
- Family: Lycaenidae
- Genus: Cigaritis
- Species: C. baghirmii

Binomial name
- Cigaritis baghirmii (Stempffer, 1946)

Synonyms
- Spindasis baghirmii Stempffer, 1946

Species of butterfly

Cigaritis baghirmii is a butterfly in the family Lycaenidae. It is found in Chad.
