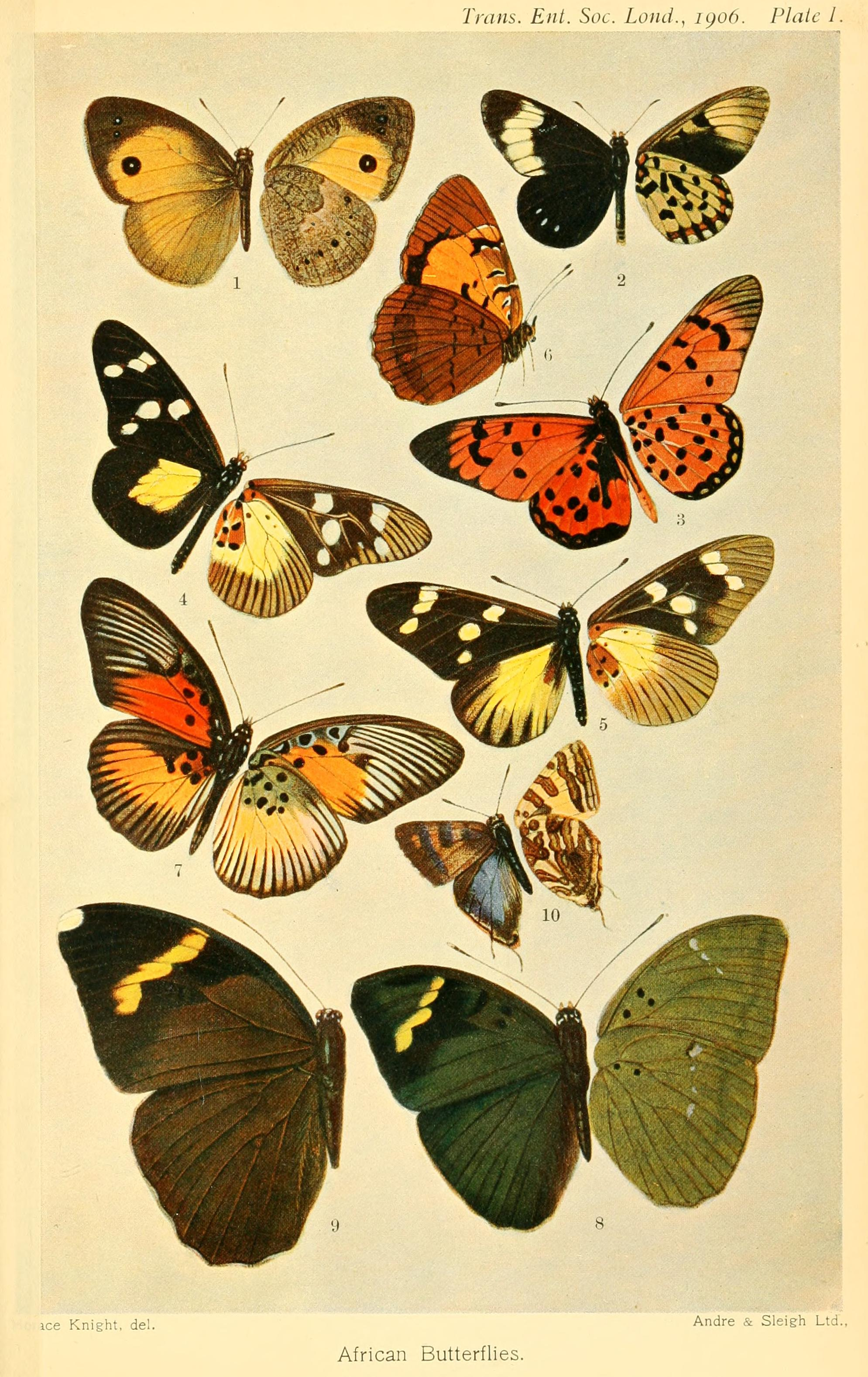
- Figure 10

Scientific classification
- Kingdom: Animalia
- Phylum: Arthropoda
- Clade: Pancrustacea
- Class: Insecta
- Order: Lepidoptera
- Family: Lycaenidae
- Genus: Cigaritis
- Species: C. tavetensis

Binomial name
- Cigaritis tavetensis (Lathy, 1906)

Synonyms
- Spindasis tavetensis Lathy, 1906

= Cigaritis tavetensis =

Taveta silverline

Species of butterfly

Cigaritis tavetensis, the Taveta silverline, is a butterfly in the family Lycaenidae. It is found in western Tanzania. The habitat consists of savanna.

They feed on Acacia drepanolobium within galls. They are associated with ants of the genus Pheidole.
