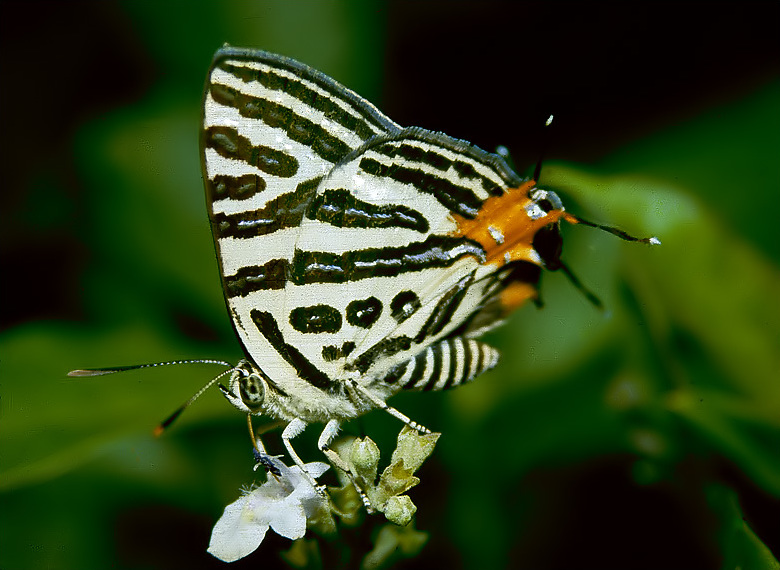
- Cigaritis syama in Nepal

Scientific classification
- Kingdom: Animalia
- Phylum: Arthropoda
- Clade: Pancrustacea
- Class: Insecta
- Order: Lepidoptera
- Family: Lycaenidae
- Subfamily: Aphnaeinae
- Genus: Cigaritis; Donzel, 1847

Synonyms
- Zerythis Lucas, 1849; Spindasis Wallengren, 1857; Spindasis Wallengren, 1858; Apharitis Riley, 1925

= Cigaritis =

Butterfly genus in family Lycaenidae

Cigaritis is a genus of butterflies in the family Lycaenidae. Its species are found in the Afrotropical realm, the Indomalayan realm and adjacent regions of Asia.

Cigaritis includes species that used to be placed in two other genera: Apharitis Riley, 1925 and Spindasis Wallengren, 1857. The latter were synonymised with Cigaritis by Heath et al., 2002, and this synonymy is followed in recent works.

== Species ==
Listed alphabetically:

- Cigaritis abnormis (Moore, [1884])
- Cigaritis acamas (Klug, 1834)
- Cigaritis allardi Oberthür, 1909
- Cigaritis apelles (Oberthür, 1878)
- Cigaritis apuleia (Hulstaert, 1924)
- Cigaritis arooni (Murayama & Kimura, 1990) northern Thailand
- Cigaritis avriko (Karsch, 1893)
- Cigaritis baghirmii (Stempffer, 1946)
- Cigaritis bergeri (Bouyer, 2003) DRC, Katanga, Sandoa
- Cigaritis brunnea (Jackson, 1966)
- Cigaritis buchanani (Rothschild, 1921)
- Cigaritis cilissa Lederer, 1861
- Cigaritis collinsi (Kielland, 1980)
- Cigaritis crustaria (Holland, 1890)
- Cigaritis cynica (Riley, 1921)
- Cigaritis dhofarina Seizmair, 2017
- Cigaritis ducarmei (Bouyer, 2008) Congo
- Cigaritis dufranei (Bouyer, 1991) Zaïre
- Cigaritis elima (Moore, 1877) India and Sri Lanka
- Cigaritis ella (Hewitson, 1865)
- Cigaritis elwesi Evans, [1925] northwestern India
- Cigaritis epargyros (Eversmann, 1854) Arabia, Afghanistan and northern China
- Cigaritis evansii (Tytler, 1915) India ( Assam)
- Cigaritis gilletti (Riley, 1925)
- Cigaritis greeni (Heron, 1896) Sri Lanka
- Cigaritis hassoni (Bouyer, 2003)
- Cigaritis homeyeri (Dewitz, 1886)
- Cigaritis ictis (Hewitson, 1865) Sri Lanka and India
- Cigaritis iza (Hewitson, 1865)
- Cigaritis junodi (D'Abrera, 1980) South Africa
- Cigaritis kutu (Corbet, 1940) Malaysia
- Cigaritis kuyaniana (Matsumura, 1919) Taiwan
- Cigaritis larseni (Bouyer, 2012) Cameroon to Ghana
- Cigaritis learmondi (Tytler, 1940) Myanmar and Thailand
- Cigaritis leechi (Swinhoe, 1912) China
- Cigaritis lilacinus (Moore, 1884) Myanmar
- Cigaritis lohita (Horsfield, [1829])
- Cigaritis lunulifera (Moore, 1879) India
- Cigaritis lutosus (Plötz, 1880) Ghana
- Cigaritis maximus (Elwes, [1893]) Myanmar, Thailand and Laos
- Cigaritis meghamalaiensis Sadasivan & Naicker, 2023 Southern India (Western Ghats)

[= Cigaritis conjuncta Kunte & Sengupta, 2024, See Sadasivan & Sengupta, 2024].

- Cigaritis menelas (Druce, 1907)
- Cigaritis mishmisensis (South, 1913) Northeastern India (Mishimi Hills)
- Cigaritis modestus (Trimen, 1891)
- Cigaritis montana (Joicey & Talbot, 1924)
- Cigaritis mozambica (Bertolini, 1850)
- Cigaritis myrmecophila Dumont, 1922
- Cigaritis nairobiensis (Sharpe, 1904)
- Cigaritis namaquus (Trimen, 1874)
- Cigaritis natalensis (Westwood, 1851)
- Cigaritis nilus (Hewitson, 1865)
- Cigaritis nipalicus (Moore, 1884) India and Nepal
- Cigaritis nubilus (Moore, [1887]) Sri Lanka
- Cigaritis nyassae (Butler, 1884)
- Cigaritis overlaeti (Bouyer, 1998)
- Cigaritis phanes (Trimen, 1873)
- Cigaritis pinheyi (Heath, 1983)
- Cigaritis rukma (de Nicéville, [1889]) India (Sikkim), Bhutan
- Cigaritis rukmini (de Nicéville, [1889]) India (Sikkim and Assam)
- Cigaritis schistacea (Moore, [1881]) India and Sri Lanka
- Cigaritis scotti (Gabriel, 1954)
- Cigaritis seliga (Fruhstorfer, 1912) Myanmar, Thailand, Indonesia and Malaysia
- Cigaritis shaba (Bouyer, 1991)
- Cigaritis siphax (Lucas, 1849) Algeria and Tunisia
- Cigaritis somalina (Butler, [1886])
- Cigaritis syama (Horsfield, [1829]) China, Taiwan, Malaysia, Indonesia, Thailand, Singapore and Philippines
- Cigaritis takanonis (Matsumura, 1906) Japan
- Cigaritis tanganyikae (Kielland, 1990)
- Cigaritis tavetensis (Lathy, 1906)
- Cigaritis trifurcata (Moore, 1882) India
- Cigaritis trimeni (Neave, 1910)
- Cigaritis uighurica Kemal & Koçak, 2005 (Replacement name for Cigaritis maxima Staudinger, 1901, junior homonym of Cigaritis maximus (Elwes, [1893])
- Cigaritis victoriae (Butler, 1884)
- Cigaritis vixinga (Hewitson, 1875) Thailand, Indonesia
- Cigaritis vulcanus (Fabricius, 1775)
- Cigaritis zhengweille (Huang, 1998) Yunnan (China)
- Cigaritis zohra Donzel, 1847 Morocco and Algeria
