= Cigaritis hassoni =

Scientific classification
- Kingdom: Animalia
- Phylum: Arthropoda
- Clade: Pancrustacea
- Class: Insecta
- Order: Lepidoptera
- Family: Lycaenidae
- Genus: Cigaritis
- Species: C. hassoni

Binomial name
- Cigaritis hassoni (Bouyer, 2003)

Synonyms
- Spindasis hassoni Bouyer, 2003

Species of butterfly

Cigaritis hassoni is a butterfly in the family Lycaenidae. It is found in Katanga Province of the Democratic Republic of the Congo.
