= Cigaritis brunnea =

Little bar

Scientific classification
- Kingdom: Animalia
- Phylum: Arthropoda
- Clade: Pancrustacea
- Class: Insecta
- Order: Lepidoptera
- Family: Lycaenidae
- Genus: Cigaritis
- Species: C. brunnea

Binomial name
- Cigaritis brunnea (Jackson, 1966)

Synonyms
- Spindasis brunnea Jackson, 1966

Species of butterfly

Cigaritis brunnea, the little bar, is a butterfly in the family Lycaenidae. It is found in Uganda, western Tanzania, the Democratic Republic of the Congo (Kivu), Zambia and north-western and south-eastern Zimbabwe.
