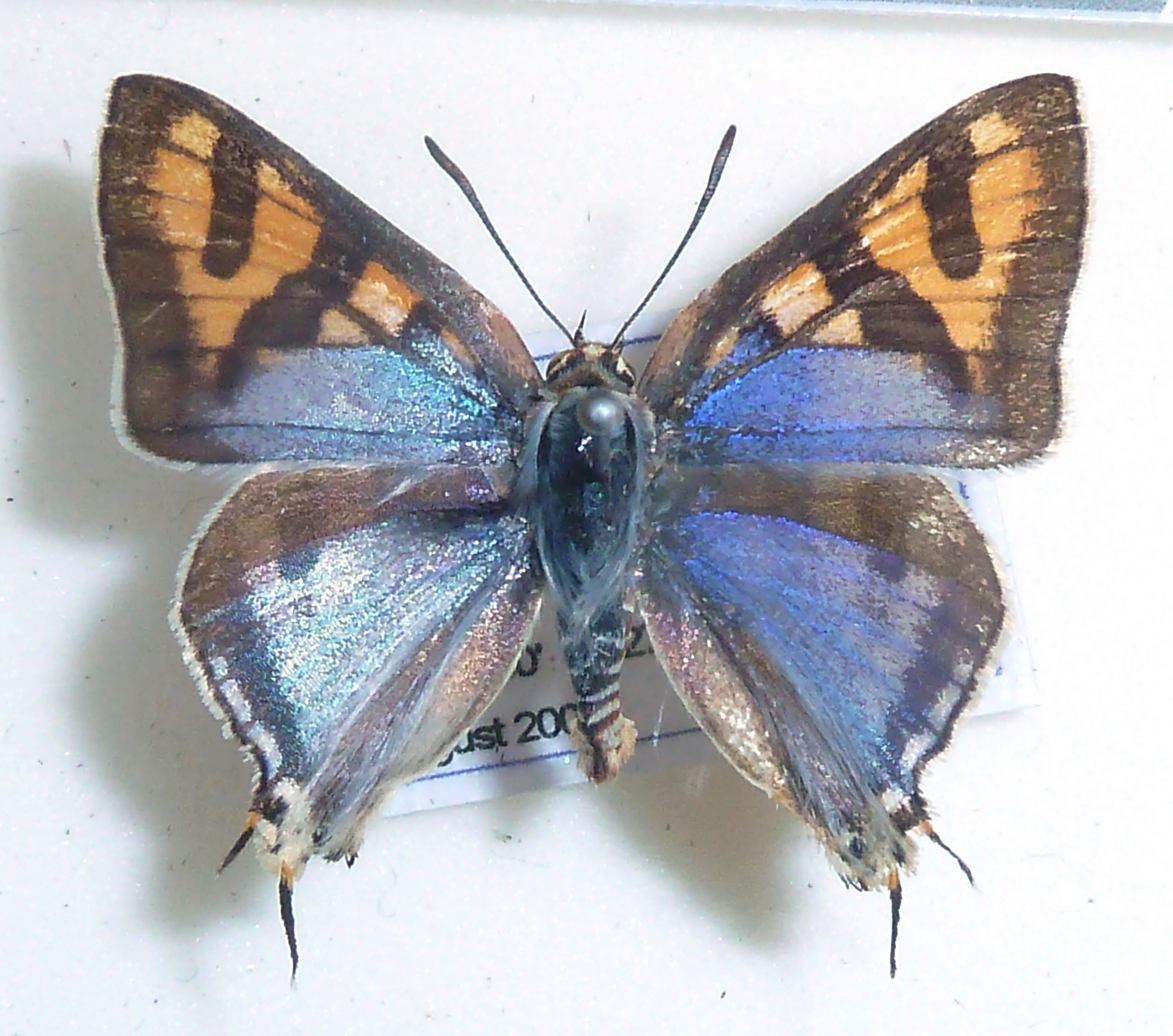

Scientific classification
- Kingdom: Animalia
- Phylum: Arthropoda
- Clade: Pancrustacea
- Class: Insecta
- Order: Lepidoptera
- Family: Lycaenidae
- Genus: Cigaritis
- Species: C. natalensis

Binomial name
- Cigaritis natalensis (Westwood, 1851)

Synonyms
- Aphnaeus natalensis Westwood, 1851; Amblypodia natalensis Westwood, 1852; Spindasis masilikazi Wallengren, 1857; Spindasis natalensis; Spindasis natalensis ab. obscura Aurivillius, 1923

= Cigaritis natalensis =

Natal bar

Species of butterfly

Cigaritis natalensis, the Natal bar or Natal barred blue, is a butterfly of the family Lycaenidae. It is found in South Africa, from the Eastern Cape along the coast to KwaZulu-Natal, Eswatini, the Free State, Mpumalanga, Gauteng, Limpopo and North West provinces, and part of the Northern Cape province. It is also present in Botswana.

The wingspan is 25–32.5 mm for males and 26.5–34 mm for females. Adults are on wing year-round with peaks from September to October and from March to May.

The larvae feed on Canthium inerme, Clerodendrum glabrum and Ximenia afra.
