= Cigaritis tanganyikae =

Scientific classification
- Kingdom: Animalia
- Phylum: Arthropoda
- Clade: Pancrustacea
- Class: Insecta
- Order: Lepidoptera
- Family: Lycaenidae
- Genus: Cigaritis
- Species: C. tanganyikae

Binomial name
- Cigaritis tanganyikae (Kielland, 1990)

Synonyms
- Spindasis tanganyikae Kielland, 1990

Species of butterfly

Cigaritis tanganyikae is a butterfly in the family Lycaenidae. It is found in western Tanzania. The habitat mostly consists of montane regions, but it may also be found in woodland at lower altitudes.

The length of the forewings is 13.5–15.6mm for males and about 17.6 mm for females.
