= Cigaritis modestus =

Modest bar

Scientific classification
- Kingdom: Animalia
- Phylum: Arthropoda
- Clade: Pancrustacea
- Class: Insecta
- Order: Lepidoptera
- Family: Lycaenidae
- Genus: Cigaritis
- Species: C. modestus

Binomial name
- Cigaritis modestus (Trimen, 1891)

Synonyms
- Aphnaeus modestus Trimen, 1891; Spindasis modestus; Spindasis modesta heathi d'Abrera, 1980

Species of butterfly

Cigaritis modestus, the modest bar, is a butterfly in the family Lycaenidae. It is found in the Democratic Republic of the Congo, Zambia and Namibia. The habitat consists of forests.

== Subspecies ==
- Cigaritis modestus modestus (southern Angola, northern Namibia)
- Cigaritis modestus heathi (d'Abrera, 1980) (Zambia, Democratic Republic of the Congo: Lualaba)
