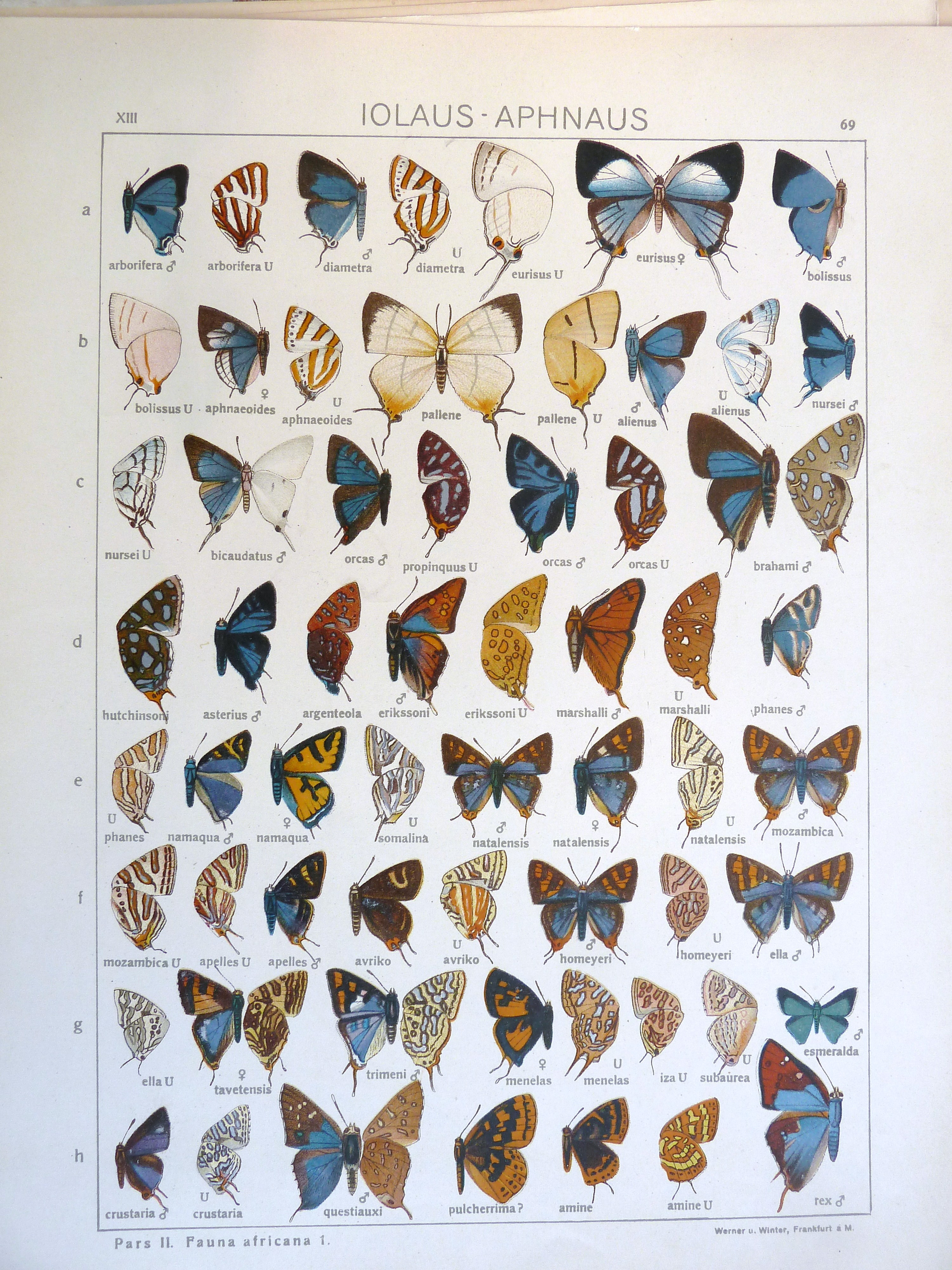
- Seitz FaunaAfricana Taf 69 (line h)

Scientific classification
- Kingdom: Animalia
- Phylum: Arthropoda
- Clade: Pancrustacea
- Class: Insecta
- Order: Lepidoptera
- Family: Lycaenidae
- Genus: Cigaritis
- Species: C. crustaria

Binomial name
- Cigaritis crustaria (Holland, 1890)

Synonyms
- Aphnaeus crustaria Holland, 1890; Spindasis crustaria

= Cigaritis crustaria =

Violet silverline

Species of butterfly

Cigaritis crustaria, the violet silverline, is a butterfly in the family Lycaenidae. It is found in Ghana (the Volta Region), Nigeria, Cameroon, Gabon, the Central African Republic, the Democratic Republic of the Congo, eastern Uganda and north-western Tanzania. The habitat consists of forests.

Adults are attracted to flowers.

Torben Larsen developed a species numbering system for his 2005 publication Butterflies of West Africa. This species is #371. The 'Larsen' numbers have since been used with permission in A Sharp Eye on Butterflies of Ghana.
