= Cigaritis apuleia =

Scientific classification
- Kingdom: Animalia
- Phylum: Arthropoda
- Clade: Pancrustacea
- Class: Insecta
- Order: Lepidoptera
- Family: Lycaenidae
- Genus: Cigaritis
- Species: C. apuleia

Binomial name
- Cigaritis apuleia (Hulstaert, 1924)

Synonyms
- Spindasis apuleia Hulstaert, 1924

Species of butterfly

Cigaritis apuleia is a butterfly in the family Lycaenidae. It is found in the Republic of the Congo and the Uele in the Democratic Republic of the Congo.
