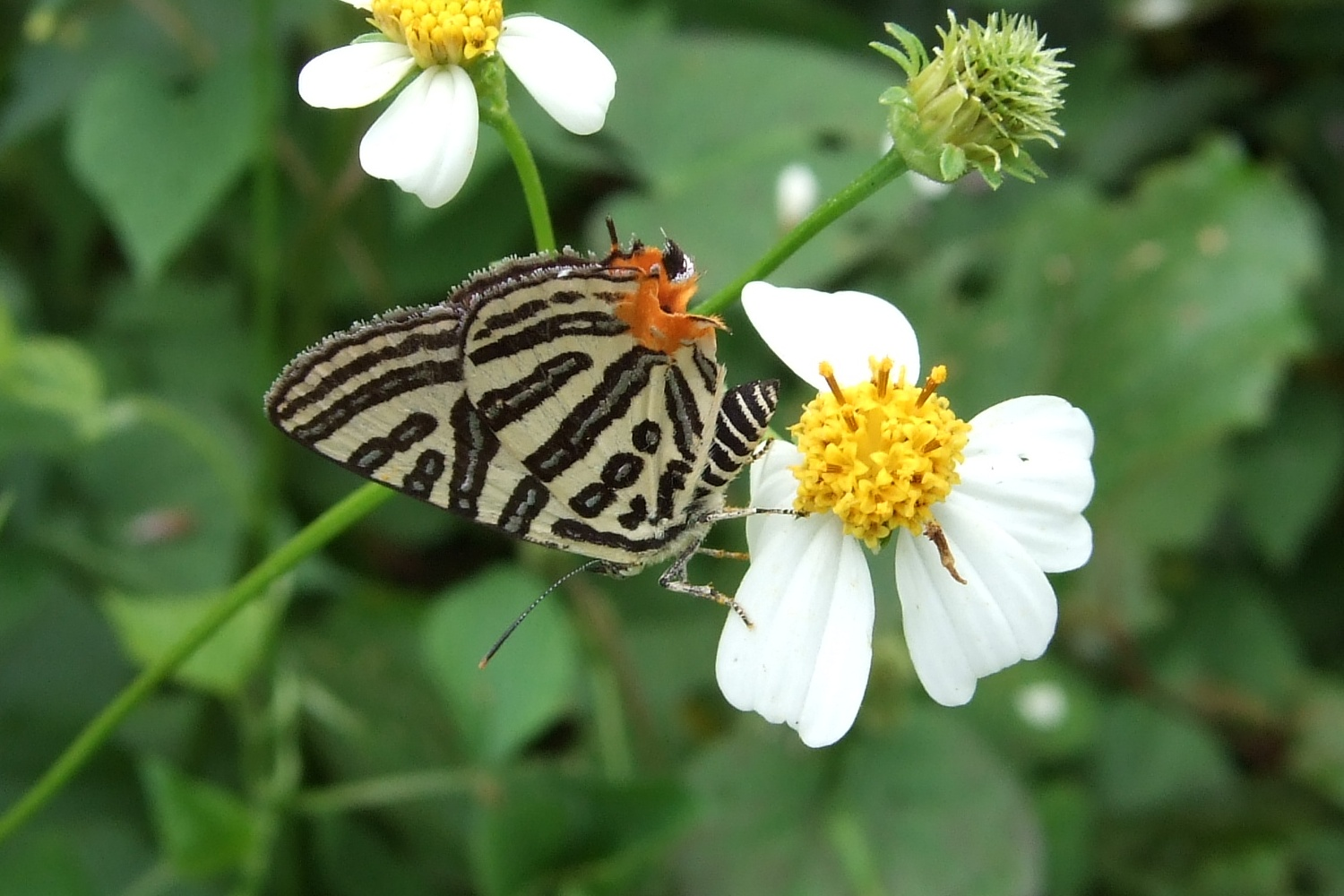

Scientific classification
- Kingdom: Animalia
- Phylum: Arthropoda
- Class: Insecta
- Order: Lepidoptera
- Family: Lycaenidae
- Genus: Cigaritis
- Species: C. syama

Binomial name
- Cigaritis syama (Horsfield, [1829])

Synonyms
- Amblypodia syama Horsfield, [1829]; Spindasis syama (Horsfield, [1829])

= Cigaritis syama =

Club silverline

Species of butterfly

Cigaritis syama, the club silverline, is a butterfly of the family Lycaenidae. It is found in South-East Asia.

The wingspan is 27–32 mm.

The larvae feed on Psidium guajava and Dioscorea batatus.

== Subspecies ==
The subspecies of Cigaritis syama found in India are-

- Cigaritis syama peguanus (Moore, 1884)
