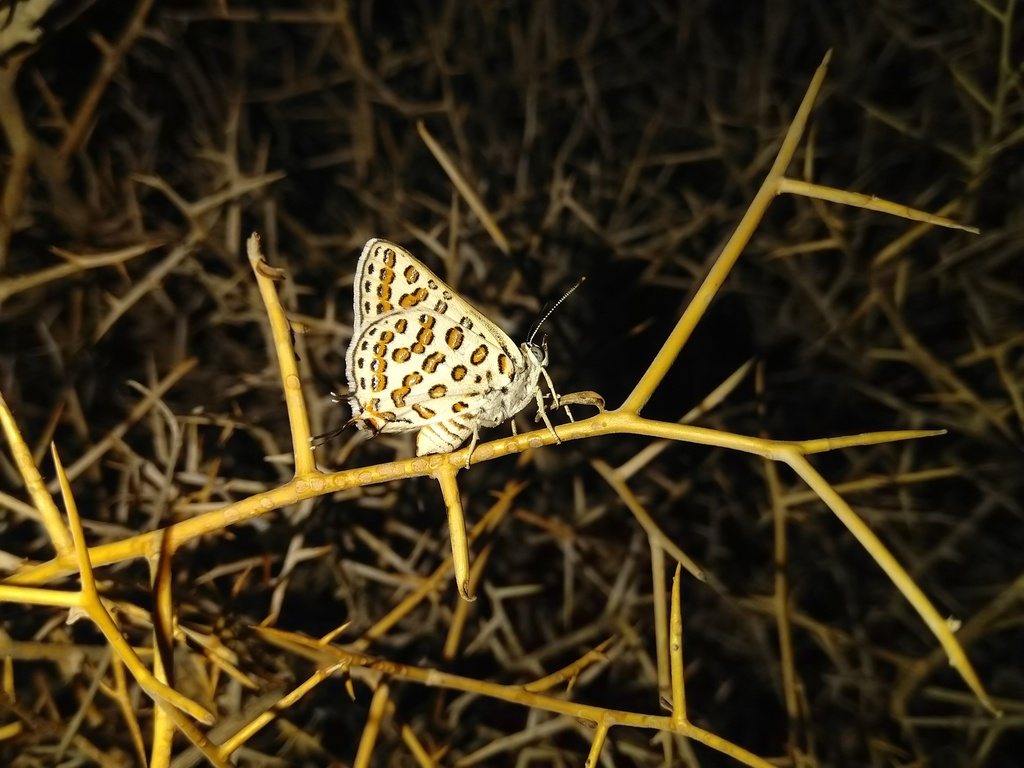

Scientific classification
- Kingdom: Animalia
- Phylum: Arthropoda
- Clade: Pancrustacea
- Class: Insecta
- Order: Lepidoptera
- Family: Lycaenidae
- Genus: Cigaritis
- Species: C. myrmecophila

Binomial name
- Cigaritis myrmecophila Dumont, 1922

Synonyms
- Apharitis myrmecophila

= Cigaritis myrmecophila =

Species of butterfly

Cigaritis myrmecophila is a butterfly in the family Lycaenidae. It is found from Algeria through Libya, Egypt and Jordan to Arabia and south-eastern Iran.

The larvae feed on Calligonum comosum. They live in the nests of ants of the genus Crematogaster.
