= Cigaritis buchanani =

Scientific classification
- Kingdom: Animalia
- Phylum: Arthropoda
- Clade: Pancrustacea
- Class: Insecta
- Order: Lepidoptera
- Family: Lycaenidae
- Genus: Cigaritis
- Species: C. buchanani

Binomial name
- Cigaritis buchanani (Rothschild, 1921)

Synonyms
- Spindasis buchanani Rothschild, 1921

Species of butterfly

Cigaritis buchanani is a butterfly in the family Lycaenidae. It is found in the Gambia, northern Nigeria, Mali and Chad.
