= Cigaritis overlaeti =

Scientific classification
- Kingdom: Animalia
- Phylum: Arthropoda
- Clade: Pancrustacea
- Class: Insecta
- Order: Lepidoptera
- Family: Lycaenidae
- Genus: Cigaritis
- Species: C. overlaeti

Binomial name
- Cigaritis overlaeti (Bouyer, 1998)

Synonyms
- Spindasis overlaeti Bouyer, 1998

Species of butterfly

Cigaritis overlaeti is a butterfly in the family Lycaenidae. It is found in the Democratic Republic of the Congo and Zambia.
