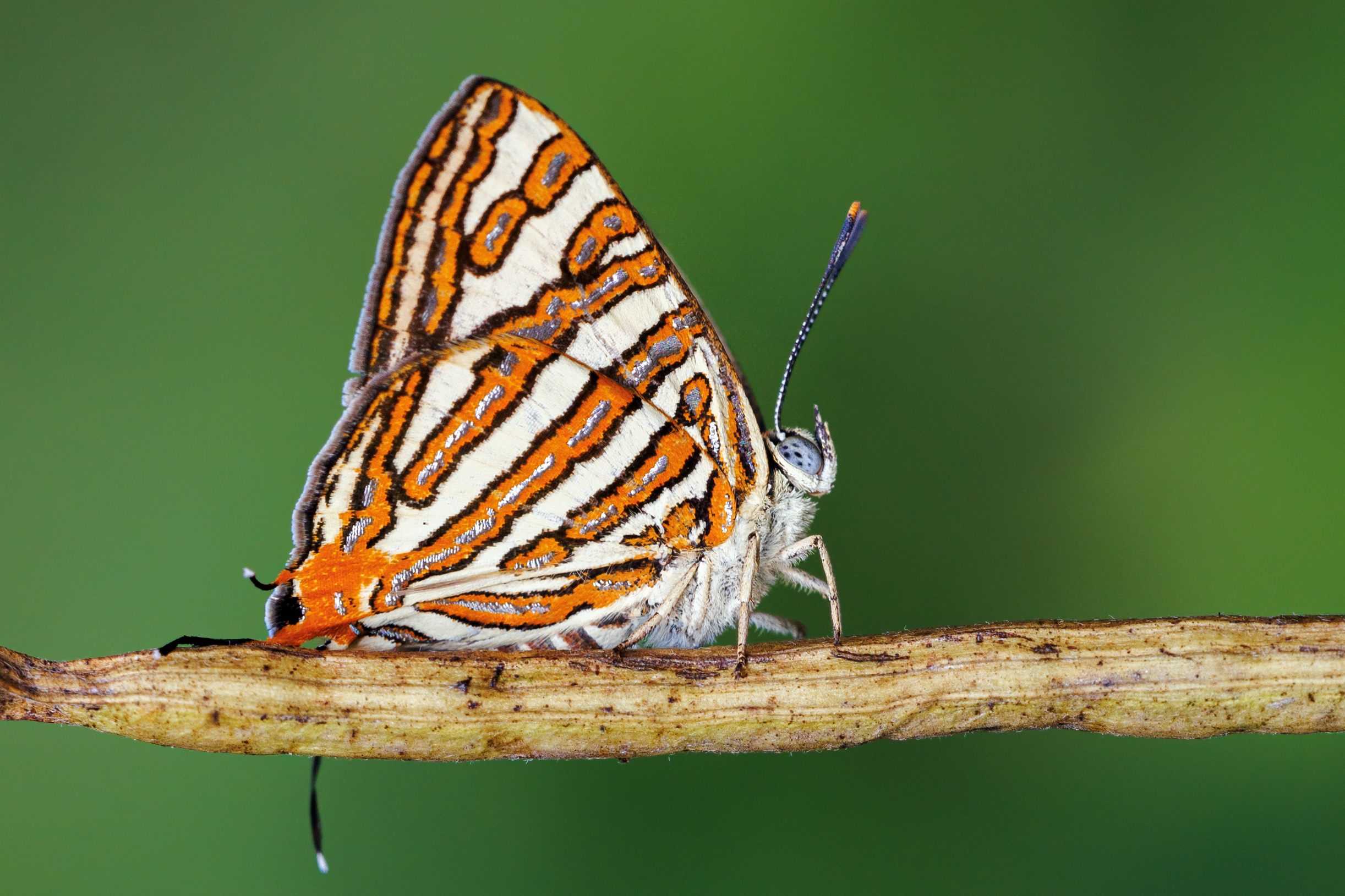

Scientific classification
- Kingdom: Animalia
- Phylum: Arthropoda
- Clade: Pancrustacea
- Class: Insecta
- Order: Lepidoptera
- Family: Lycaenidae
- Genus: Cigaritis
- Species: C. schistacea

Binomial name
- Cigaritis schistacea (Moore, [1881])

Synonyms
- Aphnaeus schistacea Moore, [1881]; Spindasis schistacea (Moore, [1881])

= Cigaritis schistacea =

Plumbeous silverline

Species of butterfly

Cigaritis schistacea, the plumbeous silverline, is a species of lycaenid or blue butterfly found in Sri Lanka, south India and Myanmar.

== Description ==
Male. Upperside brown, paler in colour than Cigaritis vulcanus fusca. Forewing very variable in markings, sometimes the orange-red transverse streaks are very few and ill defined, sometimes towards the upper outer part of the wing they are so broad as to form an orange-red ground colour traversed by brown bands. Hindwing highly tinted with blue (not lilac as in fusca), the disc in certain lights being bright blue in fresh specimens, anal orange-red patch and tails as in fusca. Underside with the ground colour and bands as in fusca, but all the bands are at more even distances apart from each other and are consequently closer together. Female. Upperside brown like the male, but with no blue tint or gloss; markings above and below similar, but the bands on the underside a good deal broader than they are in the male.

— Charles Swinhoe, Lepidoptera Indica. Vol. IX

== Notes and references ==
- Biodiversity data portal
