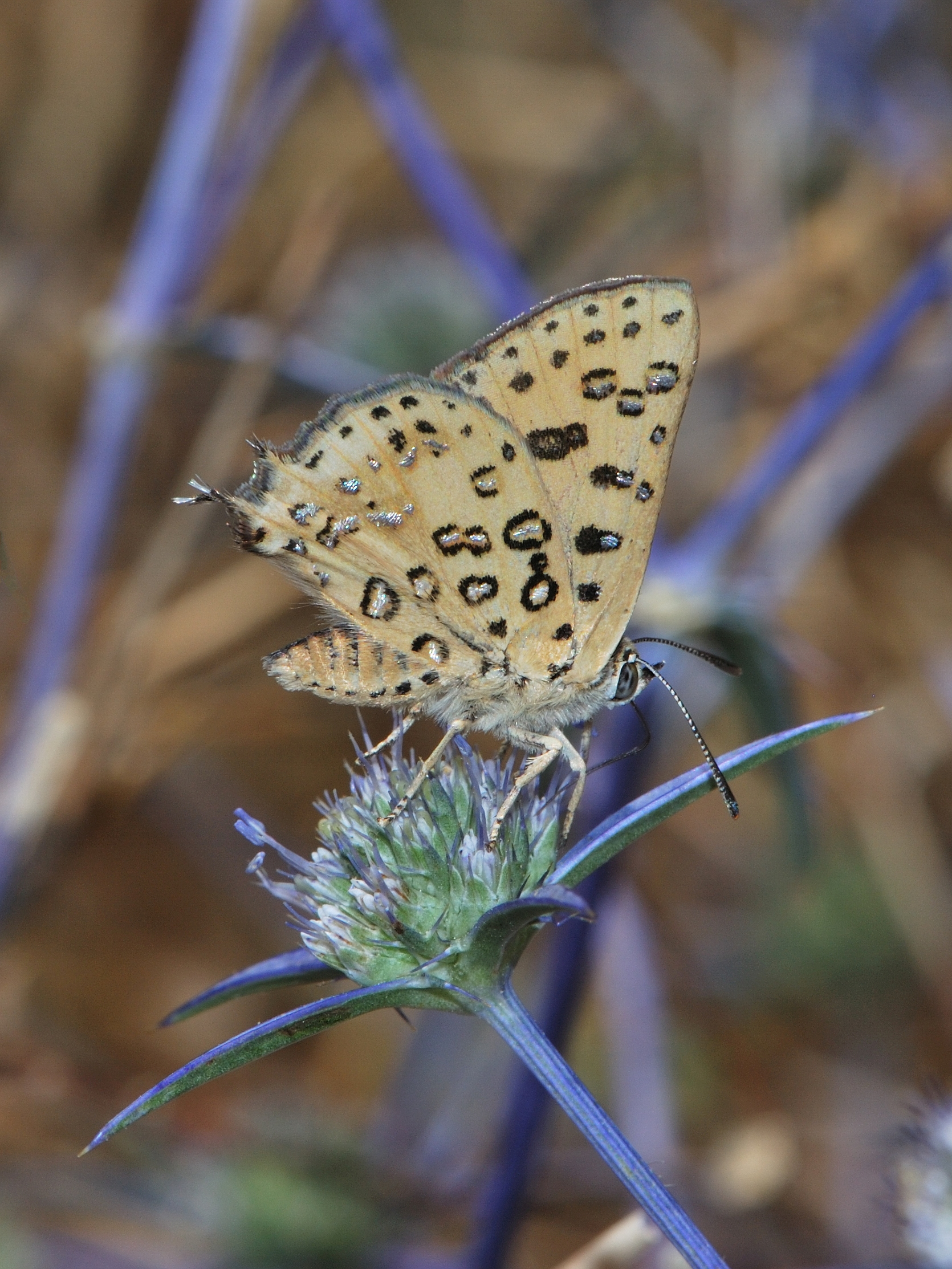

Scientific classification
- Kingdom: Animalia
- Phylum: Arthropoda
- Clade: Pancrustacea
- Class: Insecta
- Order: Lepidoptera
- Family: Lycaenidae
- Genus: Cigaritis
- Species: C. cilissa

Binomial name
- Cigaritis cilissa Lederer, 1861

Synonyms
- Apharitis cilissa (Lederer, 1891)

= Cigaritis cilissa =

Species of butterfly

Cigaritis cilissa is a butterfly of the family Lycaenidae. It is found in Iran, Iraq, Israel, Syria and Turkey.
