= Cigaritis cynica =

Scientific classification
- Kingdom: Animalia
- Phylum: Arthropoda
- Clade: Pancrustacea
- Class: Insecta
- Order: Lepidoptera
- Family: Lycaenidae
- Genus: Cigaritis
- Species: C. cynica

Binomial name
- Cigaritis cynica (Riley, 1921)

Synonyms
- Spindasis cynica Riley, 1921

Species of butterfly

Cigaritis cynica is a butterfly in the family Lycaenidae. It is found in the Democratic Republic of the Congo (Shaba) and Zambia.
