= Cigaritis bergeri =

Scientific classification
- Kingdom: Animalia
- Phylum: Arthropoda
- Clade: Pancrustacea
- Class: Insecta
- Order: Lepidoptera
- Family: Lycaenidae
- Genus: Cigaritis
- Species: C. bergeri

Binomial name
- Cigaritis bergeri (Bouyer, 2003)

Synonyms
- Spindasis bergeri Bouyer, 2003

Species of butterfly

Cigaritis bergeri is a butterfly in the family Lycaenidae. It is found in the Democratic Republic of the Congo (Kasai and Katanga).
