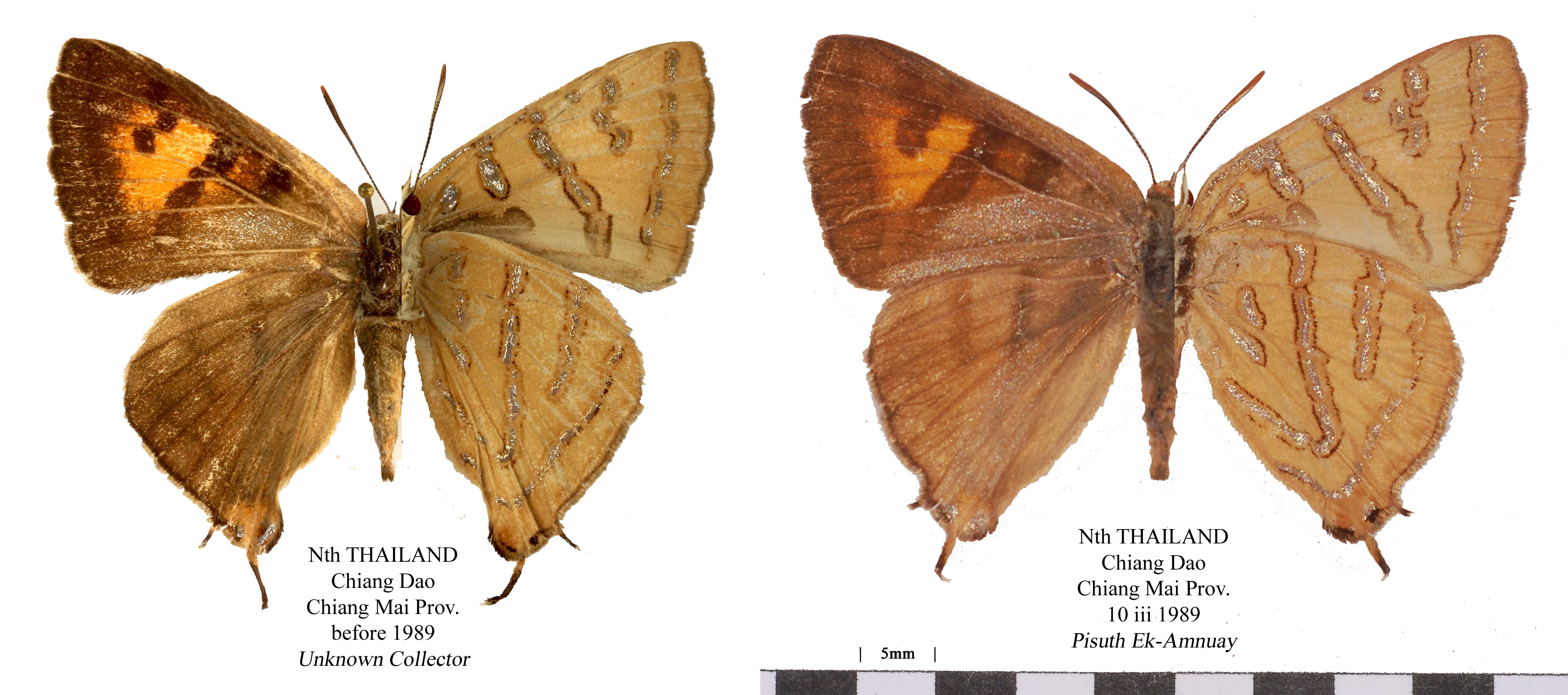
- Cigaritis maximus, male, female, set specimens Thailand

Scientific classification
- Kingdom: Animalia
- Phylum: Arthropoda
- Clade: Pancrustacea
- Class: Insecta
- Order: Lepidoptera
- Family: Lycaenidae
- Genus: Cigaritis
- Species: C. maximus

Binomial name
- Cigaritis maximus (Elwes[1893]

= Cigaritis maximus =

Karen silverline

Species of butterfly

Cigaritis maximus or Karen silverline is a butterfly in the family Lycaenidae. It was described by Henry John Elwes in 1893. It is found in Indochina in the Indomalayan realm (Burma, Thailand, and Laos).
