= Cigaritis pinheyi =

Scientific classification
- Kingdom: Animalia
- Phylum: Arthropoda
- Clade: Pancrustacea
- Class: Insecta
- Order: Lepidoptera
- Family: Lycaenidae
- Genus: Cigaritis
- Species: C. pinheyi

Binomial name
- Cigaritis pinheyi (Heath, 1983)

Synonyms
- Spindasis pinheyi Heath, 1983

Species of butterfly

Cigaritis pinheyi is a butterfly in the family Lycaenidae. It is found in north-western Zambia and possibly the Democratic Republic of the Congo.
