= Cigaritis dufranei =

Scientific classification
- Kingdom: Animalia
- Phylum: Arthropoda
- Clade: Pancrustacea
- Class: Insecta
- Order: Lepidoptera
- Family: Lycaenidae
- Genus: Cigaritis
- Species: C. dufranei

Binomial name
- Cigaritis dufranei (Bouyer, 1991)

Synonyms
- Spindasis dufranei Bouyer, 1991

Species of butterfly

Cigaritis dufranei is a butterfly in the family Lycaenidae. It is found in southern Cameroon, the Republic of the Congo and the Democratic Republic of the Congo (Haut-Zaire and Kivu).
