= Cigaritis shaba =

Scientific classification
- Kingdom: Animalia
- Phylum: Arthropoda
- Clade: Pancrustacea
- Class: Insecta
- Order: Lepidoptera
- Family: Lycaenidae
- Genus: Cigaritis
- Species: C. shaba

Binomial name
- Cigaritis shaba (Bouyer, 1991)

Synonyms
- Spindasis shaba Bouyer, 1991

Species of butterfly

Cigaritis shaba is a butterfly in the family Lycaenidae. It is found in the Democratic Republic of the Congo (Shaba).
