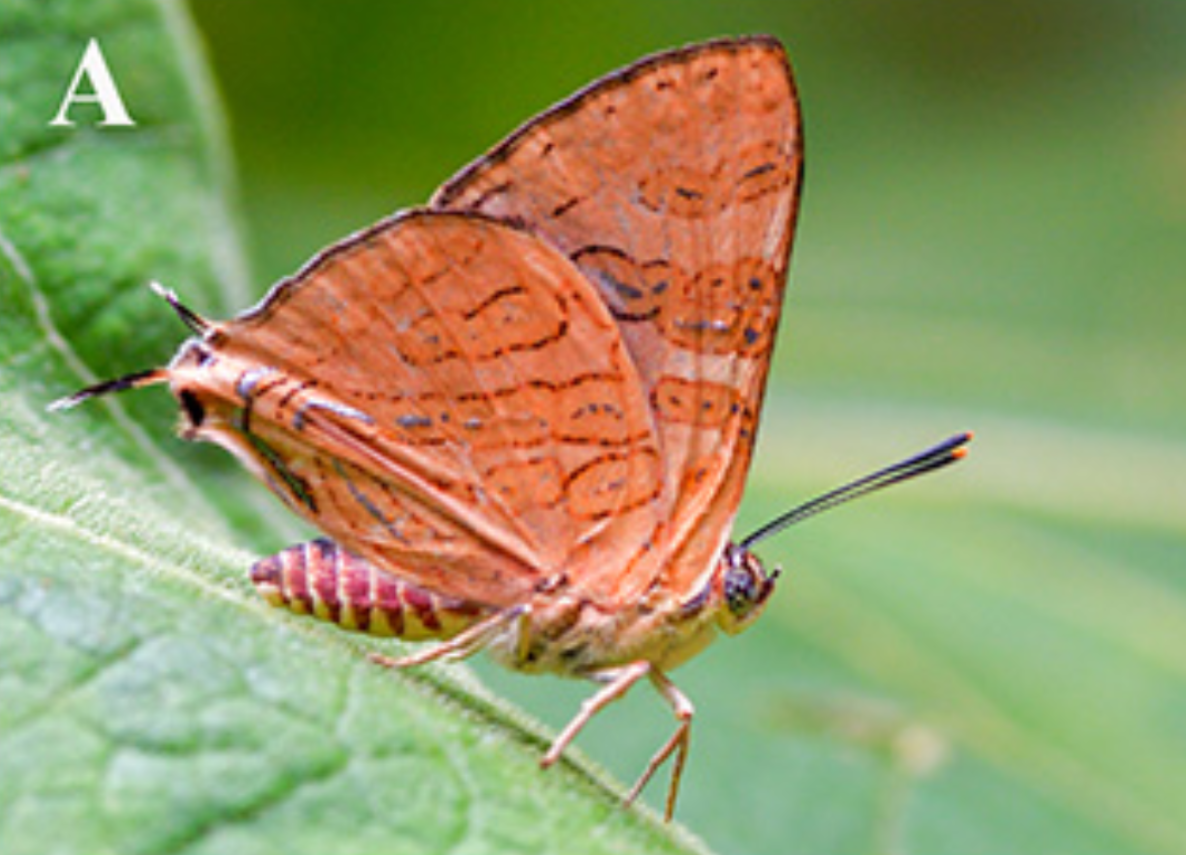
- Male
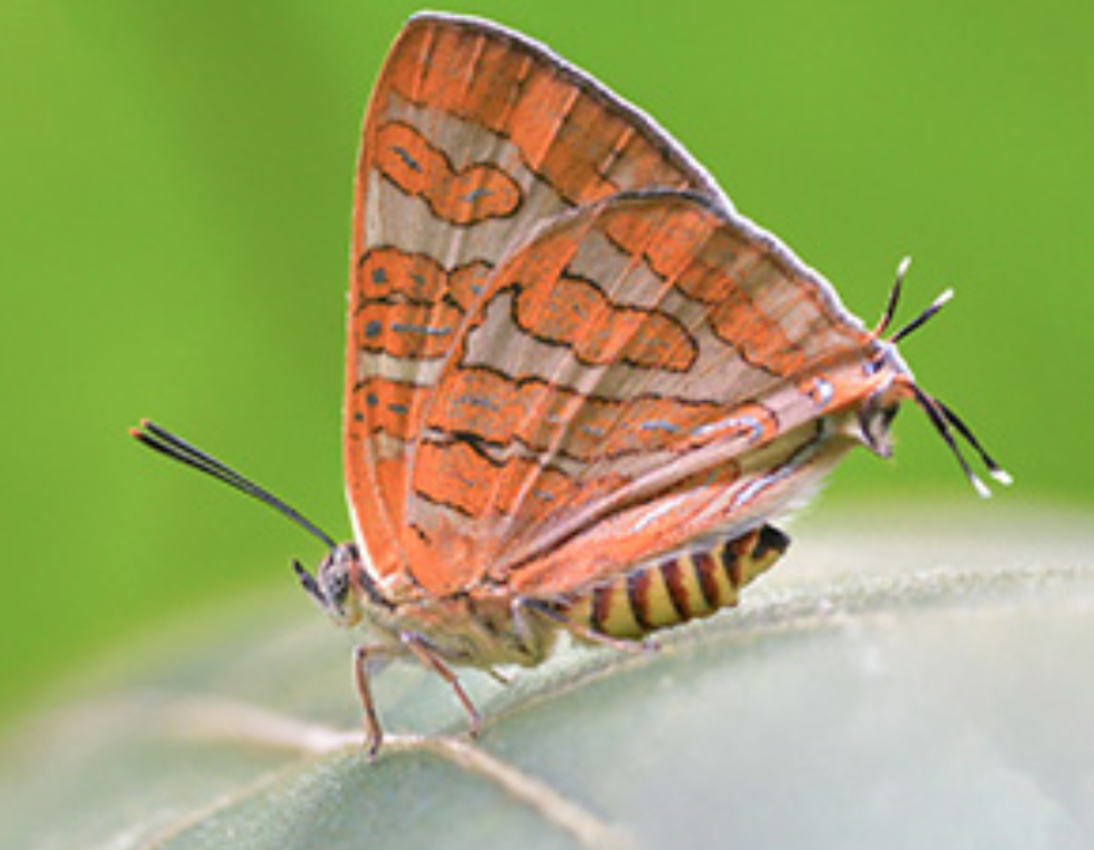
- Female

Scientific classification
- Kingdom: Animalia
- Phylum: Arthropoda
- Clade: Pancrustacea
- Class: Insecta
- Order: Lepidoptera
- Family: Lycaenidae
- Genus: Cigaritis
- Species: C. meghamalaiensis

Binomial name
- Cigaritis meghamalaiensis Sadasivan & Naicker, 2023

Synonyms
- Cigaritis conjuncta Kunte & Sengupta, 2024

= Cigaritis meghamalaiensis =

Species of butterfly

Cigaritis meghamalaiensis or the cloud-forest silverline is a butterfly in the family Lycaenidae, described by Sadasivan & Naicker, 2023 Soon after, Cigaritis conjuncta Kunte & Sengupta, 2024 was described (in Kunte et al., 2024). As the two publications seemed to be redundant descriptions of the same species, the two scientific names were synonymised in a review by Sadasivan & Sengupta, 2024.

== Description ==
Cigaritis meghamalaiensis is distinguished from other species of the genus in peninsular South Asia, having the discal and postdiscal bands on the underside of the forewing being conjoined and parallel. It is also characterized by a continuous post-basal band on the underside of the hindwing, which doesn't reach up to the discal band. The dorsal side of the wings shows extensive blue markings in males.

== Distribution ==
C. meghamalaiensis was described from the Meghamalai hills, in the southern part of the Western Ghats, India. It is found to be common around the mountainous Meghamalai region of Tamil Nadu and the nearby Periyar Tiger Reserve of Kerala. Soon after, individuals from several hundred kilometres further north, in the Kodagu District ("Coorg") of Karnataka were described as Cigaritis conjuncta. These authors stated their expectation of a wider distribution across the Western Ghats biodiversity hotspot, such as into "Tamil Nadu (Nilgiris) and southern Kerala" (p. 91). When later the two scientific names were treated as the same species in Sadasivan & Sengupta, 2024, the now broadened joint distribution was discussed against other butterflies from the Western Ghats.
