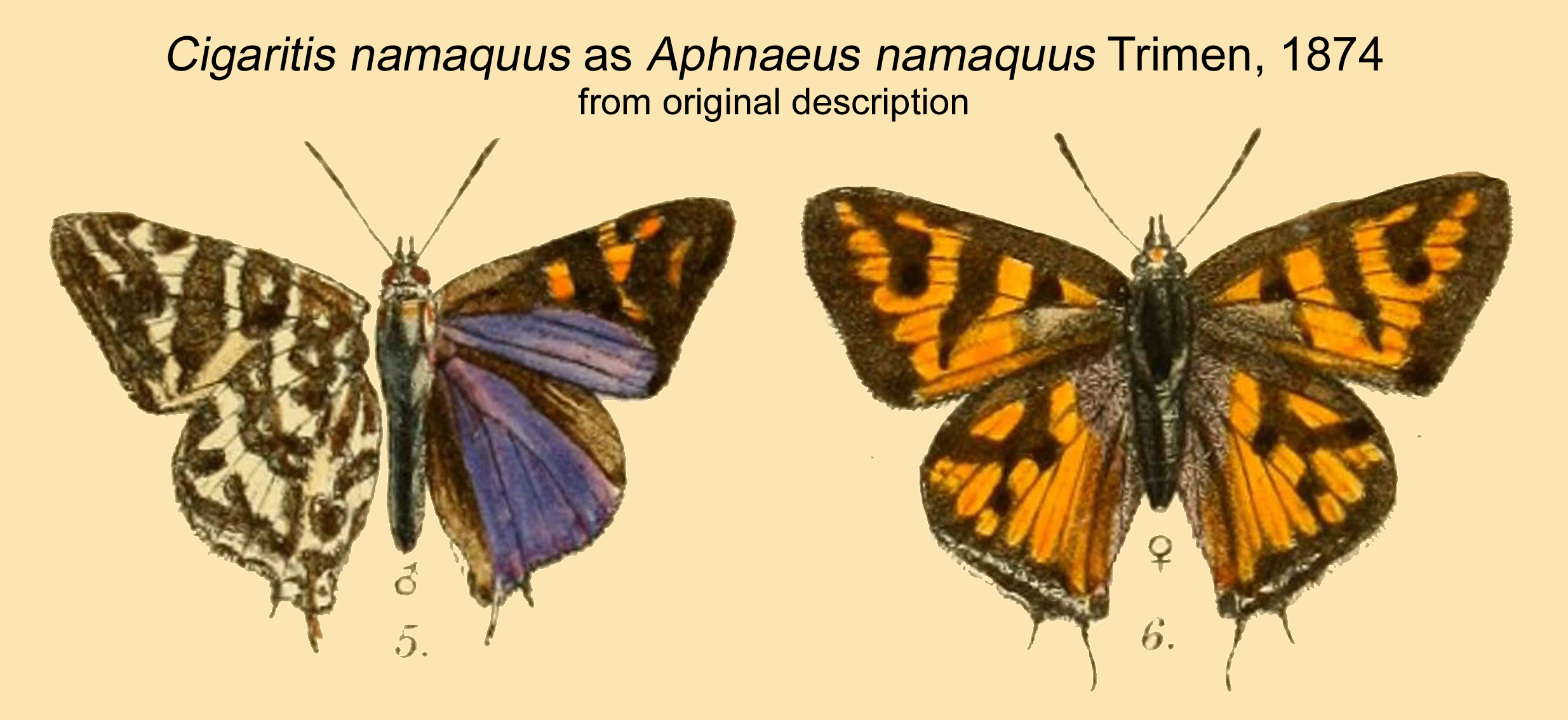

Scientific classification
- Kingdom: Animalia
- Phylum: Arthropoda
- Clade: Pancrustacea
- Class: Insecta
- Order: Lepidoptera
- Family: Lycaenidae
- Genus: Cigaritis
- Species: C. namaquus

Binomial name
- Cigaritis namaquus (Trimen, 1874)

Synonyms
- Aphnaeus namaquus Trimen, 1874; Spindasis namaquus

= Cigaritis namaquus =

Species of butterfly

Cigaritis namaquus, the Namaqua bar, is a butterfly of the family Lycaenidae. It is found in South Africa, where it is restricted to the Succulent Karoo areas from the extreme Northern Cape near the border with Namibia, to the northern parts of the Western Cape.

The wingspan is 22–25 mm for males and 24–28 mm for females. Adults are on wing from September to December with a peak in October. There is one generation per year.

The larvae feed on Zygophyllum species, including Z. retrofactum. They are associated with ants of the genus Crematogaster.
