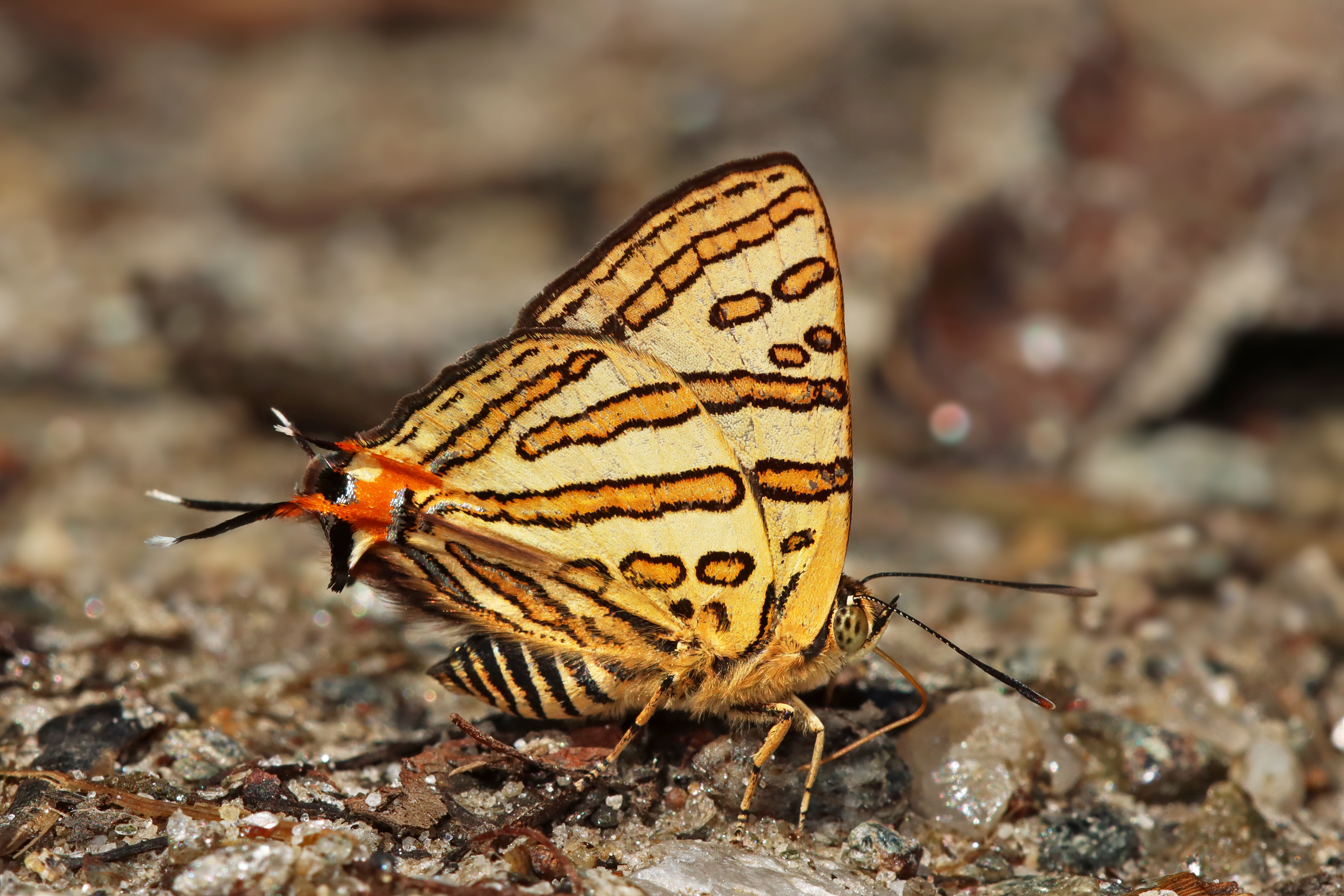

Scientific classification
- Kingdom: Animalia
- Phylum: Arthropoda
- Clade: Pancrustacea
- Class: Insecta
- Order: Lepidoptera
- Family: Lycaenidae
- Genus: Cigaritis
- Species: C. rukma

Binomial name
- Cigaritis rukma (de Nicéville, [1889])]

= Cigaritis rukma =

Silver-red silverline

Species of butterfly

Cigaritis rukma, the silver-red silverline, is a butterfly in the family Lycaenidae. It was described by Lionel de Niceville in 1889. It is found in the Indomalayan realm (Burma, Thailand, and Laos).

== Subspecies ==
- C. r. rukma Sikkim, Bhutan, Thailand
- C. r. sophia (D'Abrera, 1993) Yunnan
