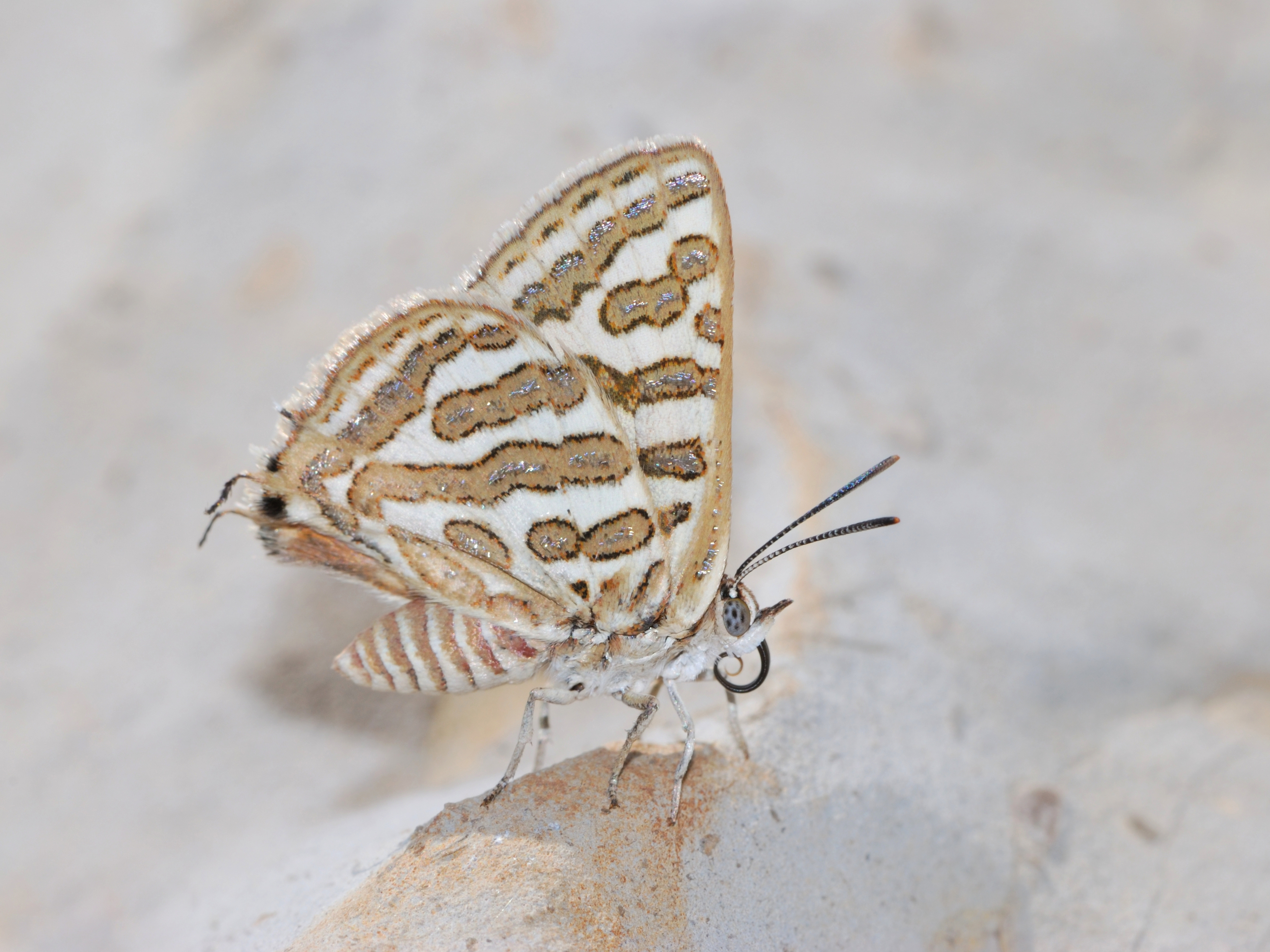

Scientific classification
- Kingdom: Animalia
- Phylum: Arthropoda
- Clade: Pancrustacea
- Class: Insecta
- Order: Lepidoptera
- Family: Lycaenidae
- Genus: Cigaritis
- Species: C. acamas

Binomial name
- Cigaritis acamas (Klug, 1834)

Synonyms
- Lycaena acamas Klug, 1834; Apharitis acamas (Klug, 1834); Spindasis bellatrix Butler, 1886; Spindasis acamas divisa Rothschild, 1915; Spindasis hypargyros Butler, 1886; Apharitis acama aegyptiaca Riley, 1925; Apharitis acama cypriaca Riley, 1925

= Cigaritis acamas =

Tawny silverline

Species of butterfly

Cigaritis acamas, the tawny silverline, Arab leopard or leopard butterfly, is a species of lycaenid or blue butterfly. It is found from North Africa and the Near East to India. The range includes Sudan, Arabia (United Arab Emirates) and Somalia. and it occurs on Cyprus.

The larvae are associated with ants of the genus Crematogaster.

== Subspecies ==
- C. a. acamas (southern Turkey to Iran, Syria, Lebanon, Israel, Jordan, the Sinai, Egypt, United Arab Emirates and probably northern Arabia)
- C. a. bellatrix (Butler, 1886) (Sudan, southern Arabia, Somalia)
- C. a. divisa (Rothschild, 1915) (Sahara, including Algeria)
- C. a. dueldueli Pfeiffer, 1932
- C. a. hypargyros (Butler, 1886) (eastern Arabia to India)
