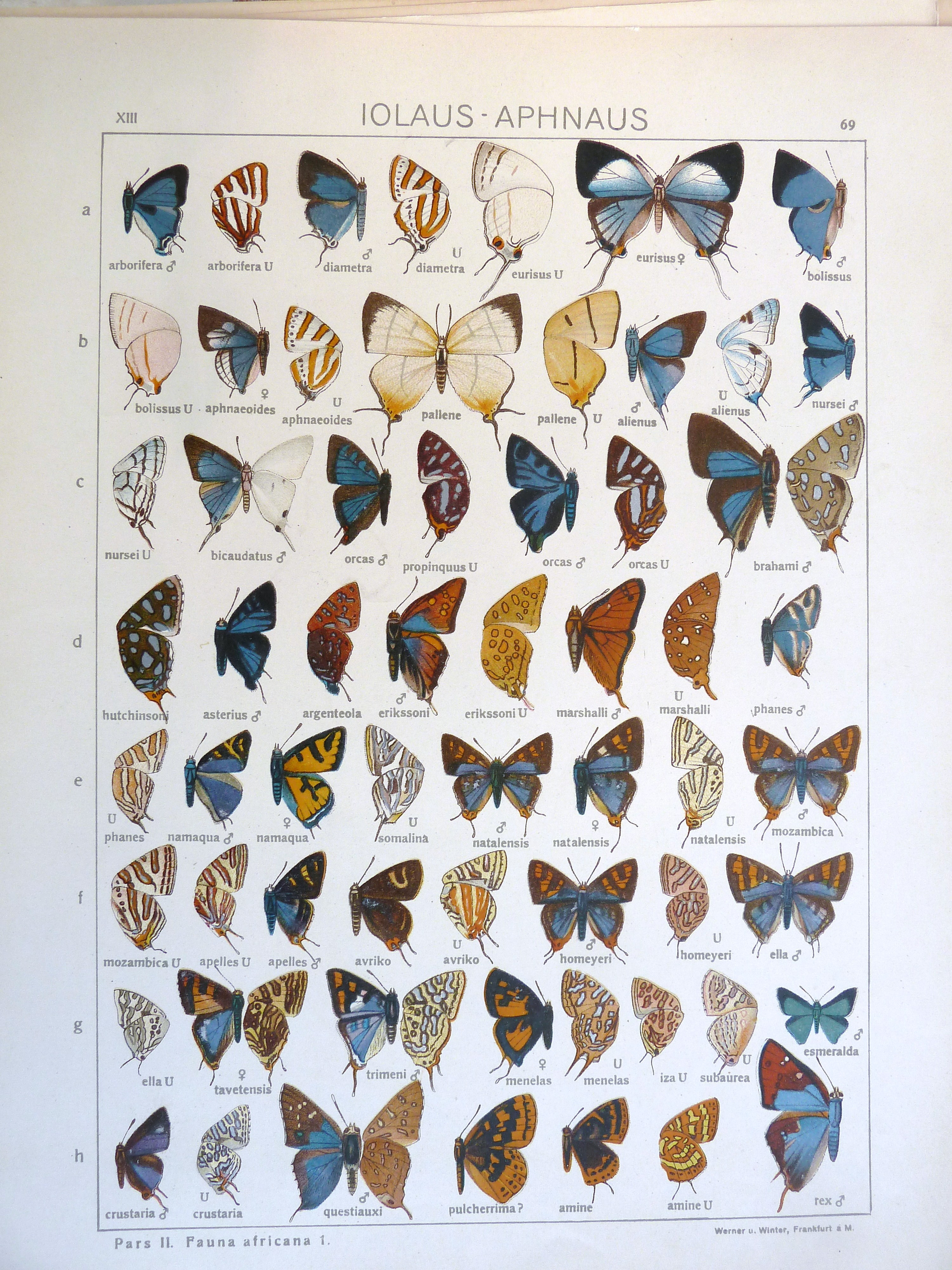
- Seitz Fauna Africana Taf69 (line f)

Scientific classification
- Kingdom: Animalia
- Phylum: Arthropoda
- Clade: Pancrustacea
- Class: Insecta
- Order: Lepidoptera
- Family: Lycaenidae
- Genus: Cigaritis
- Species: C. apelles

Binomial name
- Cigaritis apelles (Oberthür, 1878)

Synonyms
- Aphnaeus apelles Oberthür, 1878; Spindasis apelles

= Cigaritis apelles =

Rusty bar

Species of butterfly

Cigaritis apelles, the rusty bar, is a butterfly in the family Lycaenidae. It is found in Uganda, along the coast of Kenya and in Tanzania, Malawi, the Democratic Republic of the Congo (Sankuru and Lualaba), Mozambique and South Africa (KwaZulu-Natal). The habitat consists of savanna, bordering forests.
