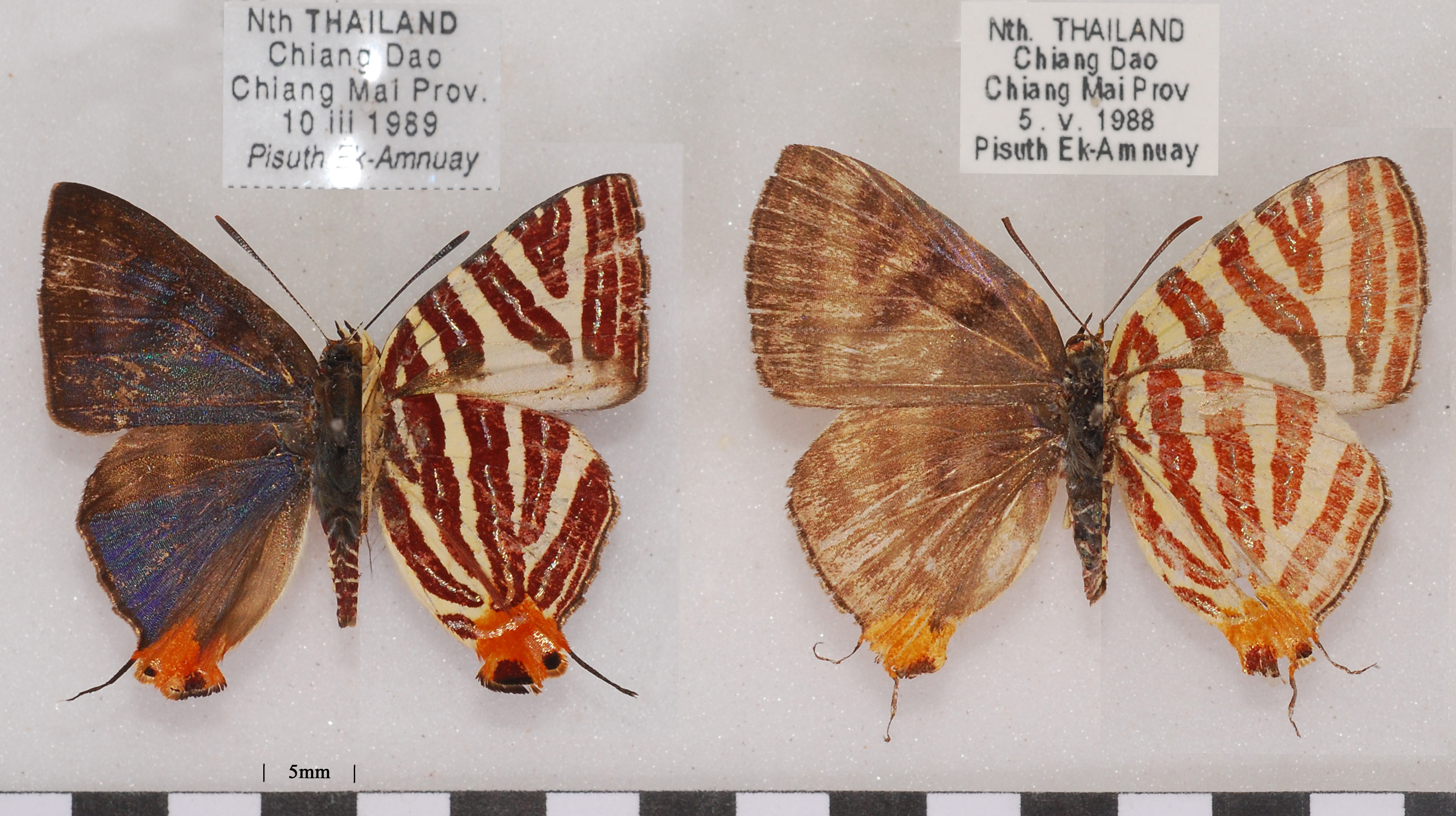

Scientific classification
- Kingdom: Animalia
- Phylum: Arthropoda
- Clade: Pancrustacea
- Class: Insecta
- Order: Lepidoptera
- Family: Lycaenidae
- Genus: Cigaritis
- Species: C. seliga

Binomial name
- Cigaritis seliga (Fruhstorfer, [1912])

Synonyms
- Aphnaeus lohita seliga Fruhstorfer, 1912; Aphnaeus lohita rokana Fruhstorfer, 1912

= Cigaritis seliga =

Large long-banded silverline

Species of butterfly

Cigaritis seliga, the large long-banded silverline, is a butterfly in the family Lycaenidae. It was described by Hans Fruhstorfer in 1912. It is found in the Indomalayan realm.

== Subspecies ==
- Cigaritis seliga seliga (Peninsular Malaysia, southern Burma, southern Thailand)
- Cigaritis seliga rokana (Fruhstorfer, 1912) (Borneo)
