= Cigaritis montana =

Scientific classification
- Kingdom: Animalia
- Phylum: Arthropoda
- Clade: Pancrustacea
- Class: Insecta
- Order: Lepidoptera
- Family: Lycaenidae
- Genus: Cigaritis
- Species: C. montana

Binomial name
- Cigaritis montana (Joicey & Talbot, 1924)

Synonyms
- Spindasis montana Joicey & Talbot, 1924

Species of butterfly

Cigaritis montana is a butterfly in the family Lycaenidae. It is found in the Democratic Republic of the Congo (Shaba).
