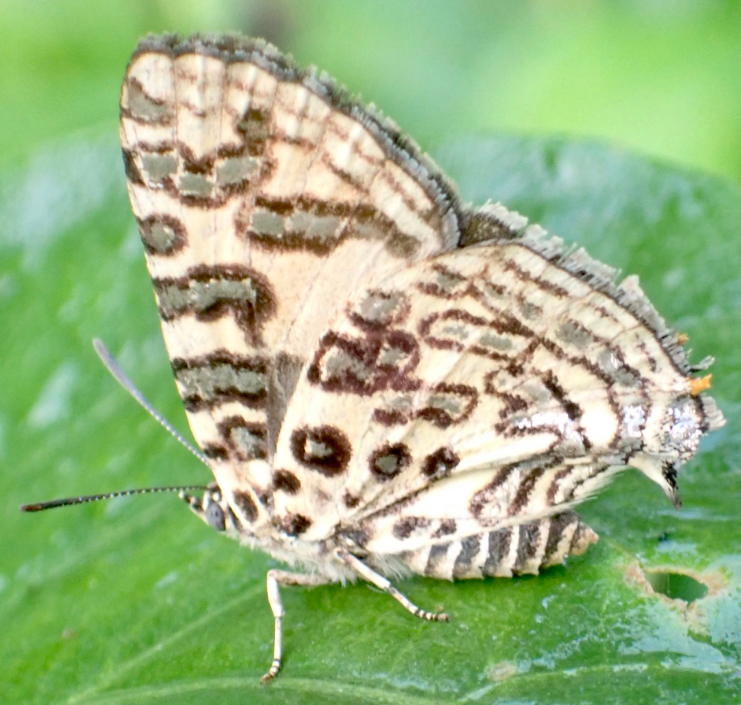

Scientific classification
- Kingdom: Animalia
- Phylum: Arthropoda
- Clade: Pancrustacea
- Class: Insecta
- Order: Lepidoptera
- Family: Lycaenidae
- Genus: Cigaritis
- Species: C. menelas

Binomial name
- Cigaritis menelas (H. H. Druce, 1907)

Synonyms
- Spindasis menelas H. H. Druce, 1907

= Cigaritis menelas =

Species of butterfly

Cigaritis menelas is a butterfly in the family Lycaenidae. The species was first described by Hamilton Herbert Druce in 1907. It is found in Ivory Coast, Ghana, southern Nigeria and western Cameroon. The habitat consists of forests.
