= Cigaritis collinsi =

Scientific classification
- Kingdom: Animalia
- Phylum: Arthropoda
- Clade: Pancrustacea
- Class: Insecta
- Order: Lepidoptera
- Family: Lycaenidae
- Genus: Cigaritis
- Species: C. collinsi

Binomial name
- Cigaritis collinsi (Kielland, 1980)

Synonyms
- Spindasis collinsi Kielland, 1980

Species of butterfly

Cigaritis collinsi is a butterfly in the family Lycaenidae. It is found in Tanzania (from the north-eastern part of the country to the Usambara Mountains).
