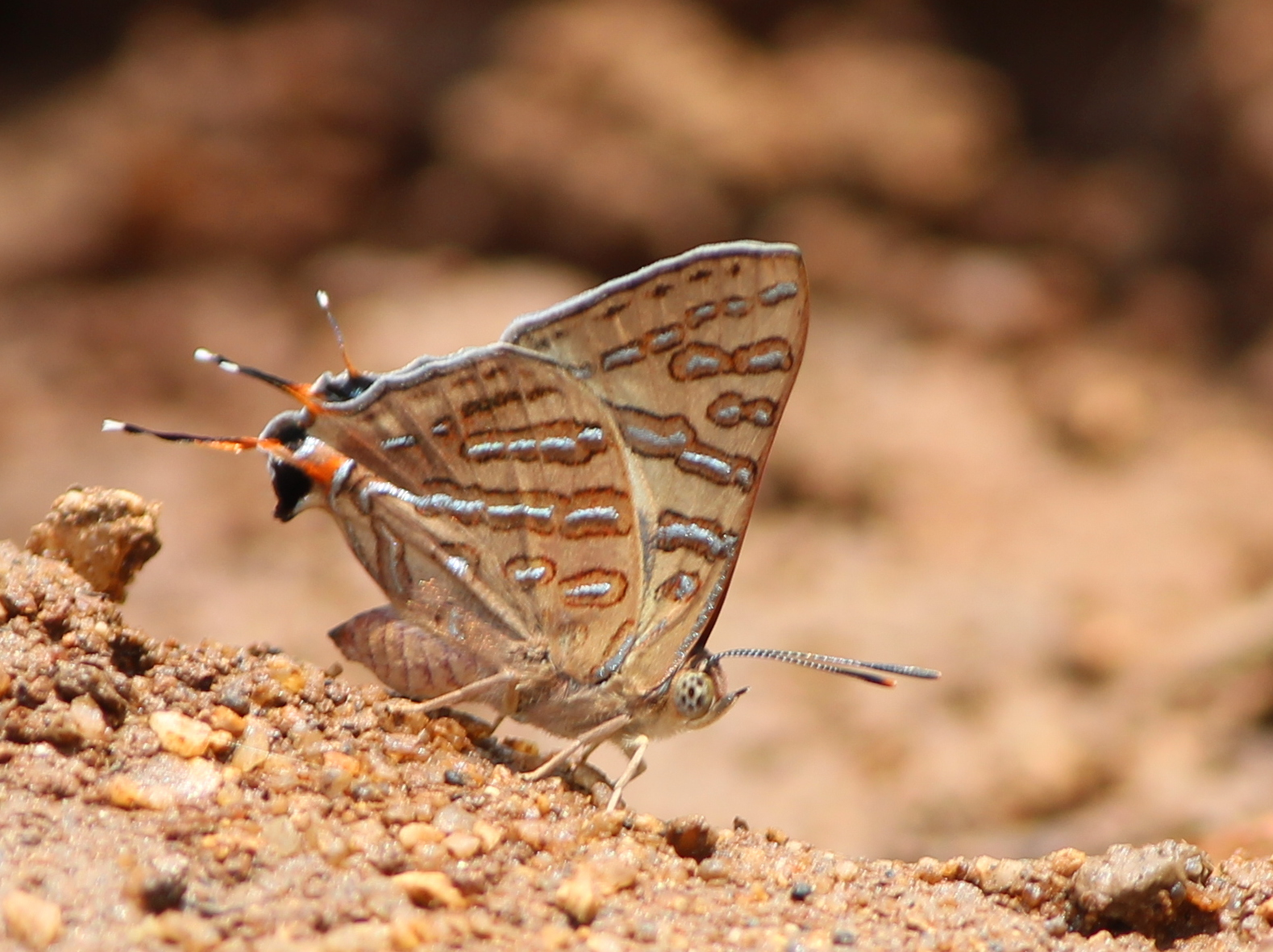

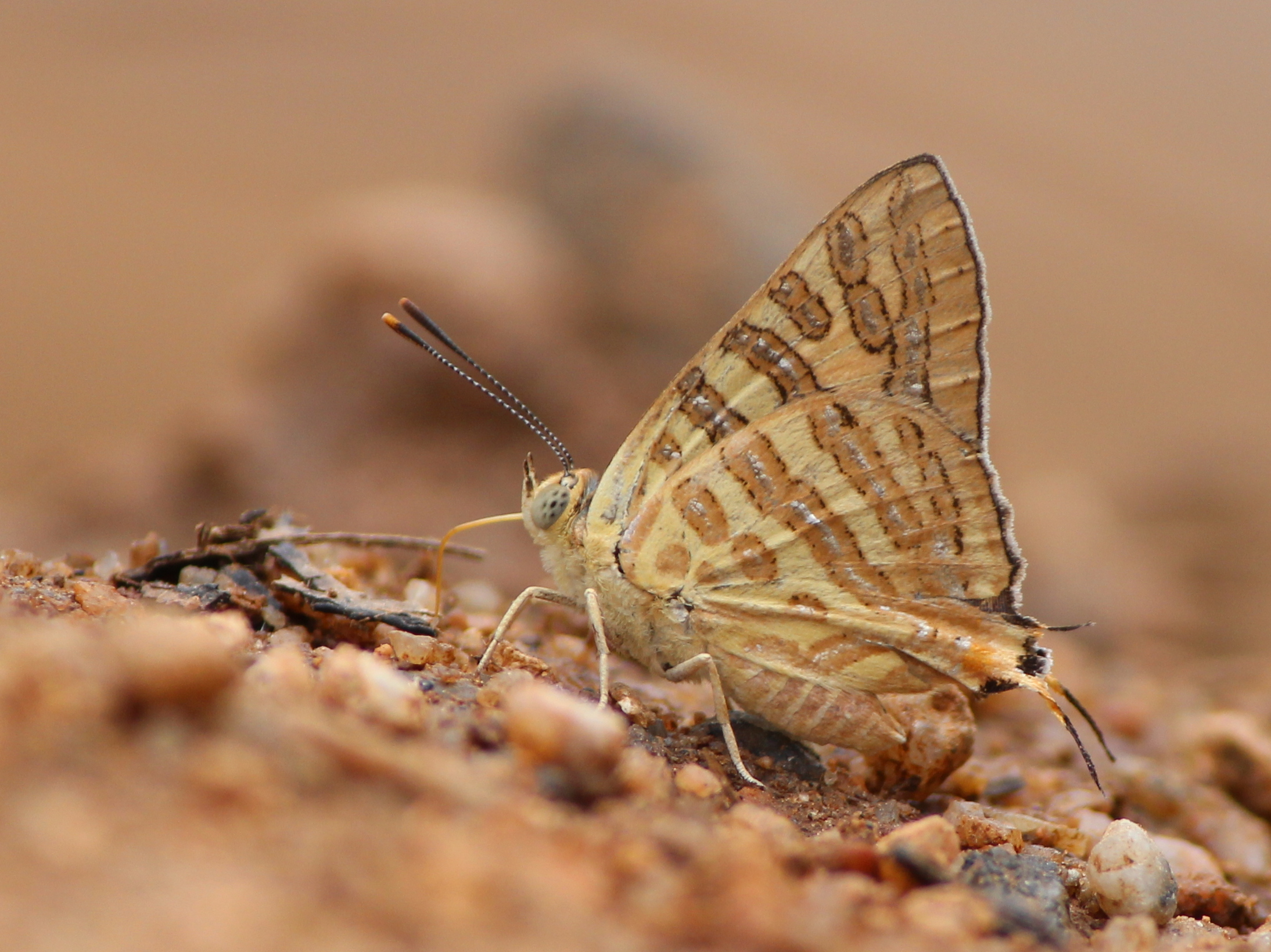

Scientific classification
- Kingdom: Animalia
- Phylum: Arthropoda
- Clade: Pancrustacea
- Class: Insecta
- Order: Lepidoptera
- Family: Lycaenidae
- Genus: Cigaritis
- Species: C. ictis

Binomial name
- Cigaritis ictis (Hewitson, [1865])

Synonyms
- Aphnaeus ictis Hewitson, [1865]; Spindasis ictis (Hewitson, [1865])

= Cigaritis ictis =

Common shot silverline

Species of butterfly

Cigaritis ictis, the common shot silverline, is a species of lycaenid butterflies. It is native to India and Sri Lanka. The Sri Lankan population is classified as a subspecies: Cigaritis ictis ceylonica (Felder, 1868).

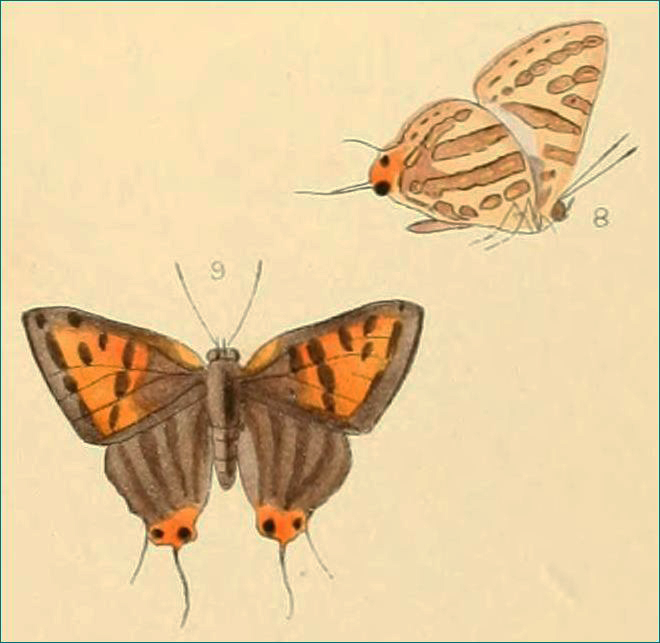
Cigaritis ictis, ♀, N. India, from original description.

== Description ==
Male. Upperside brown, with a purplish reflection in certain lights. Forewing with a somewhat triangular-shaped orange patch in the upper disc, variable in size in different examples, with two short blackish bars in it, the inner the shorter, where the orange space runs sufiiciently inwards there is another bar outwardly oblique right across its inner side. Hindwing with the abdominal space broadly rufous-grey, the anal patch dull greyish-orange, with two somewhat obscure blackish small spots; tails black, tipped with white, their bases orange. Marginal line of both wings blackish brown. Cilia white. Underside pale, dull ochreous-grey, bands pale ochreous-brown, all with some silvery scales down their centers, some of the bands of the forewings with dark linear edgings. Forewing with a small spot in the cell, a bar across the end extending to the costa, a band from the middle of the costa, outwardly oblique to the sub-median vein to near the hinder angle where it is somewhat close to the narrow sub-marginal band, two short bands from the costa between them, the inner one the shorter. Hindwing with an obscure basal band which runs close down the abdominal margin, ante-medial, medial, and post-medial bands from the costa, the two outer ones abruptly curved inwards above the anal patch to the abdominal margin, the postmedial band extending only to vein 4, and a sub-marginal band, all these bands somewhat obscure; anal patch slightly paler than the rest of the wing. Female. Above and below very similar to the male, but the anal patch on both sides is bright orange-red, and the anal spots larger. Antennas black, with white segmental dots at the sides; head and body above and below concolorous with the wings.

— Charles Swinhoe, Lepidoptera Indica. Vol. IX
