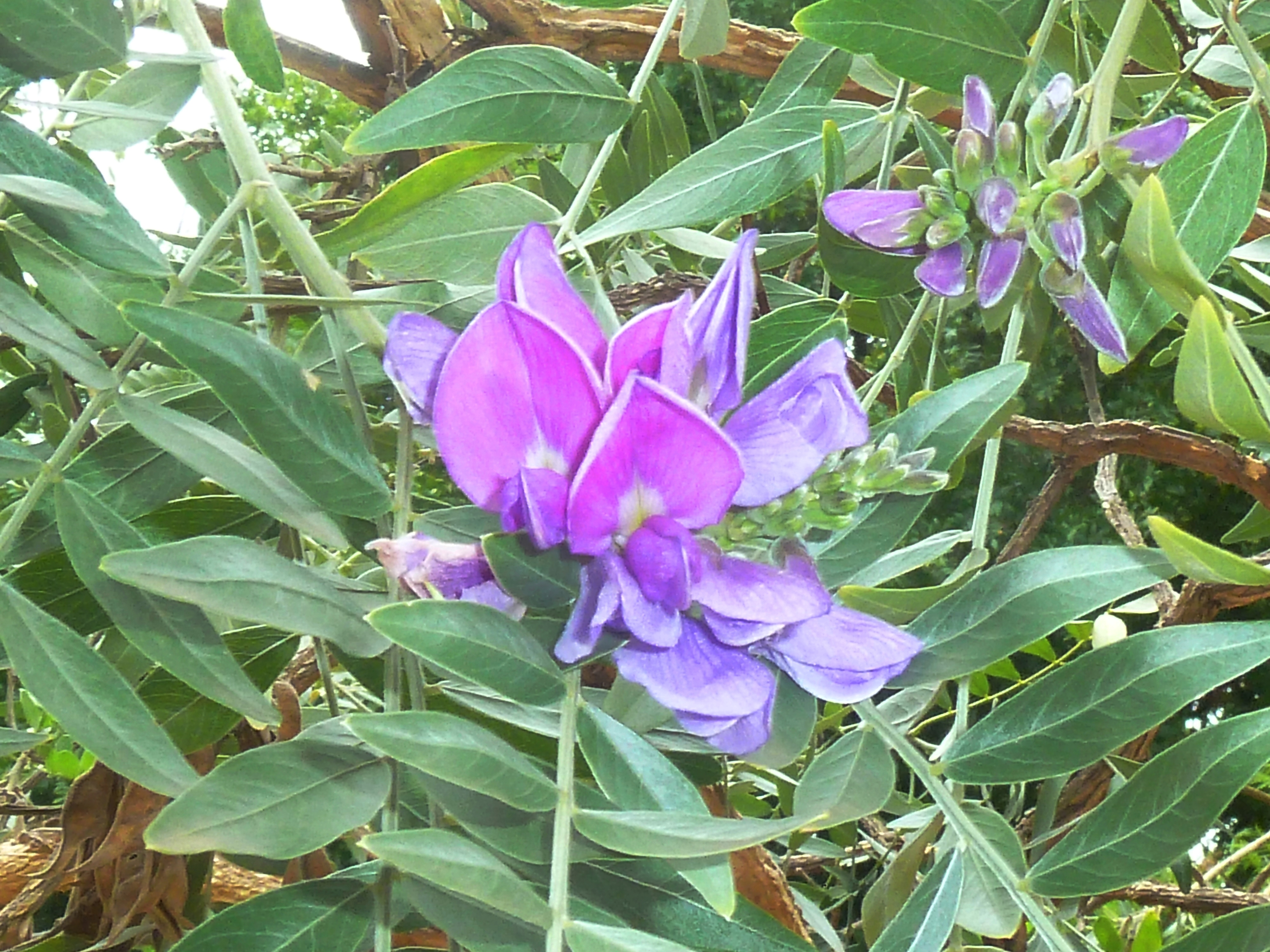

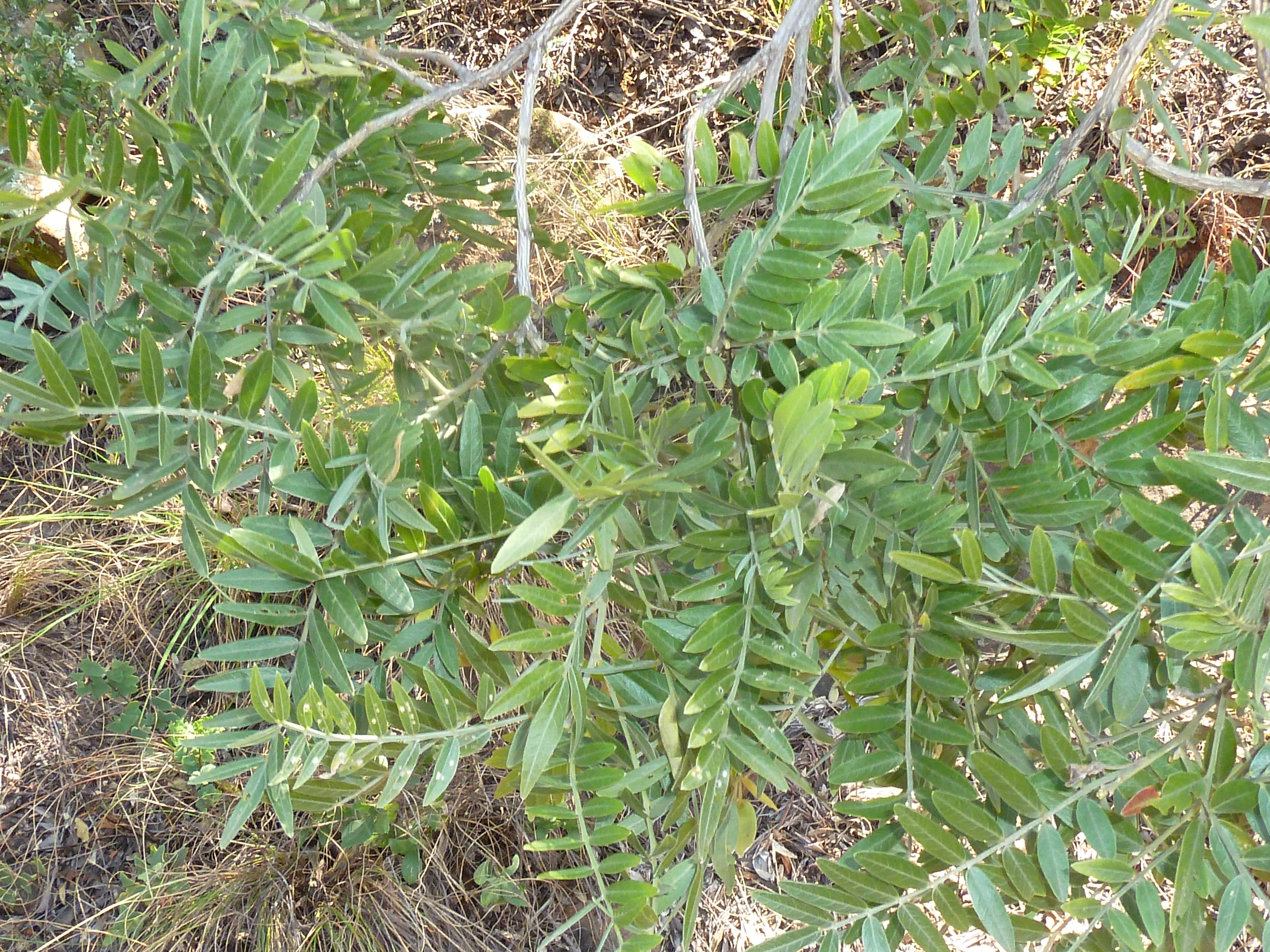
- M. sericea, flowers and foliage

Scientific classification
- Kingdom: Plantae
- Clade: Tracheophytes
- Clade: Angiosperms
- Clade: Eudicots
- Clade: Rosids
- Order: Fabales
- Family: Fabaceae
- Subfamily: Faboideae
- Tribe: Millettieae
- Genus: Mundulea (DC.) Benth. (1852)

Species
- 12; see text

= Mundulea =

Genus of legumes

Mundulea is a genus of flowering plants in the family Fabaceae. It includes 12 species of small trees and shrubs native to sub-Saharan Africa, Madagascar, and India. It belongs to the subfamily Faboideae.

== Species ==
There are 12 accepted species.

- Mundulea anceps R.Vig.
- Mundulea ankazobeensis Du Puy & Labat
- Mundulea antanossarum Baill.
- Mundulea barclayi (Telfair ex Hook.) R.Vig. ex Du Puy & Labat
- Mundulea chapelieri (Baill.) R.Vig. ex Du Puy & Labat
- Mundulea laxiflora Baker
- Mundulea menabeensis R.Vig.
- Mundulea micrantha R.Vig.
- Mundulea obovata Du Puy & Labat
- Mundulea sericea (Willd.) A.Chev.
- Mundulea stenophylla R.Vig.
- Mundulea viridis R.Vig.
