= Alenia =

Alenia may refer to:

== Companies ==
- Alenia Aermacchi, an Italian aeronautics company, founded in 2012
- Alenia Aeronautica, a former Italian aeronautics company, founded in 1990 and merged into Alenia Aermacchi
- Alenia Marconi Systems, a former Anglo-Italian defence electronics company
- Alenia Spazio, an Italian aerospace company (now Thales Alenia Space)

== Other uses ==
- Alenia (butterfly), a genus of skippers in the family Hesperiidae
