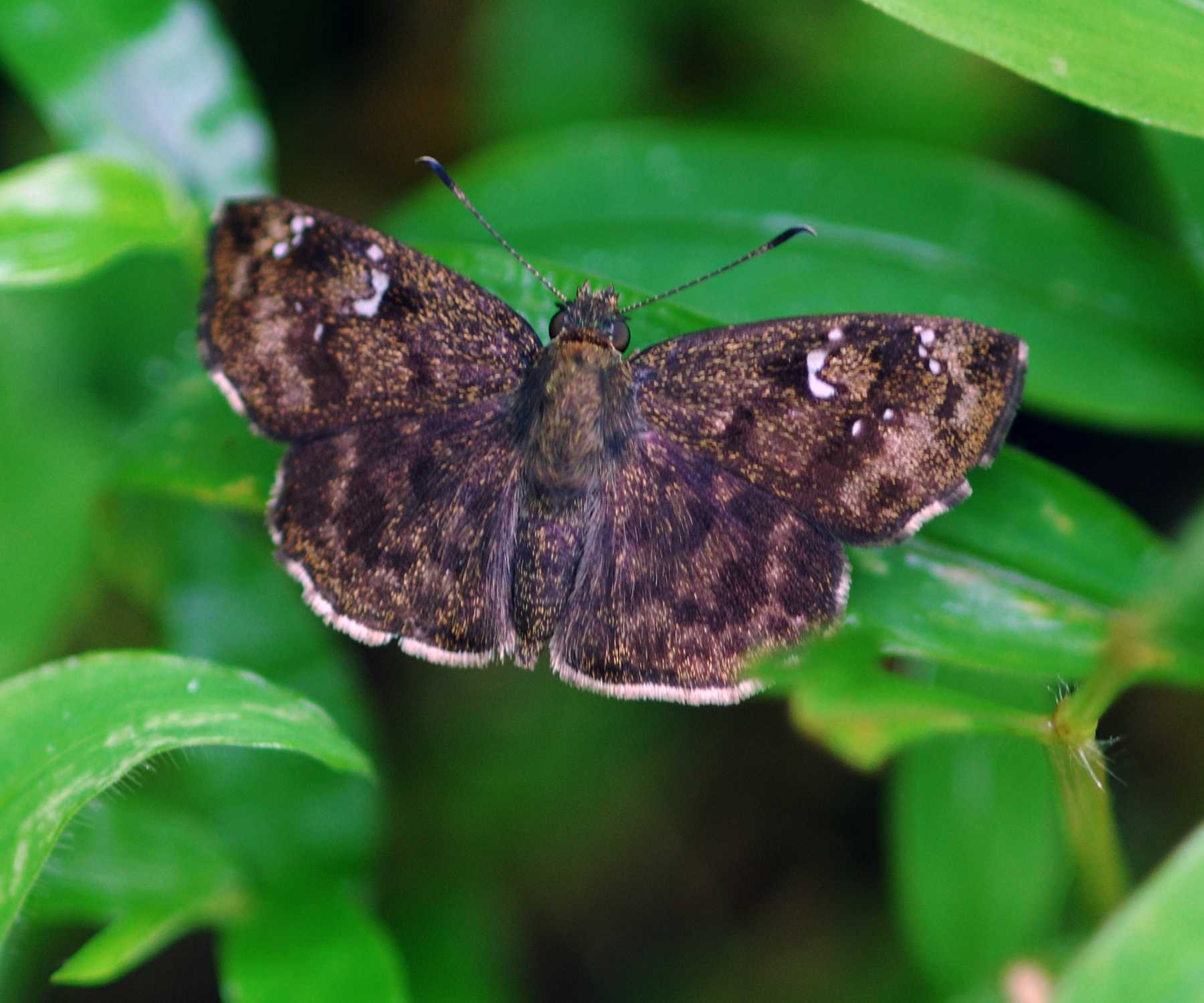
- Common small flat (Sarangesa dasahara)

Scientific classification
- Domain: Eukaryota
- Kingdom: Animalia
- Phylum: Arthropoda
- Class: Insecta
- Order: Lepidoptera
- Family: Hesperiidae
- Subfamily: Tagiadinae
- Tribe: Celaenorrhinini; Swinhoe, 1912

Diversity
- 8 genera

= Celaenorrhinini =

Tribe of butterflies

The Celaenorrhinini are a tribe of spread-winged skippers in the skipper butterfly subfamily Tagiadinae.

These skippers are mainly found in tropical Africa. A few are found in Asia, and some species presently placed in the (paraphyletic) type genus Celaenorrhinus are found in the Neotropics.

== Genera ==
The following genera – listed in the presumed phylogenetic sequence – are placed in the Celaenorrhinini:

- Alenia
- Aurivittia
- Apallaga
- Celaenorrhinus – sprites, "flats" (paraphyletic)
- Kobelana
- Eretis – "elves"
- Sarangesa – "elfins" (formerly often in Tagiadini)
- Scopulifera Libert, 2014 - Africa
- Pseudocoladenia (formerly often in Tagiadini)
