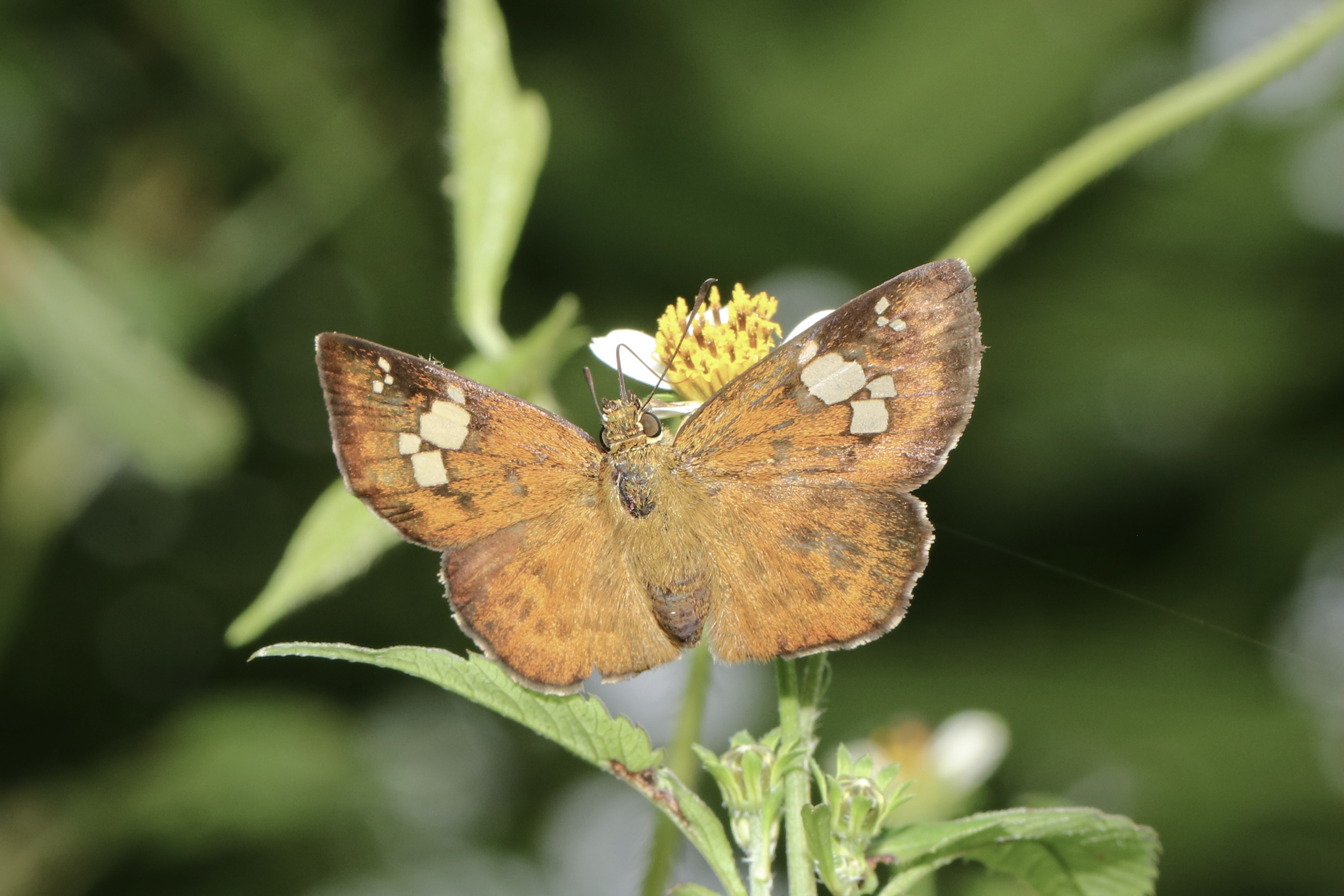

Scientific classification
- Kingdom: Animalia
- Phylum: Arthropoda
- Clade: Pancrustacea
- Class: Insecta
- Order: Lepidoptera
- Family: Hesperiidae
- Genus: Pseudocoladenia
- Species: P. festa

Binomial name
- Pseudocoladenia festa Evans, 1949

Synonyms
- Coladenia dan festa; Pseudocoladenia dan festa

= Pseudocoladenia festa =

Species of butterfly

Pseudocoladenia festa, also known as the Naga pied flat, is a butterfly in the family Hesperiidae. It is found from Sikkim to Yunnan. It was described by William Harry Evans in 1949.

== Description ==
This species is similar to Pseudocoladenia fatih, but it is darker and the upperside forewing central spots are more conjoined. The central spots are pale yellow in the males and white in the females.
