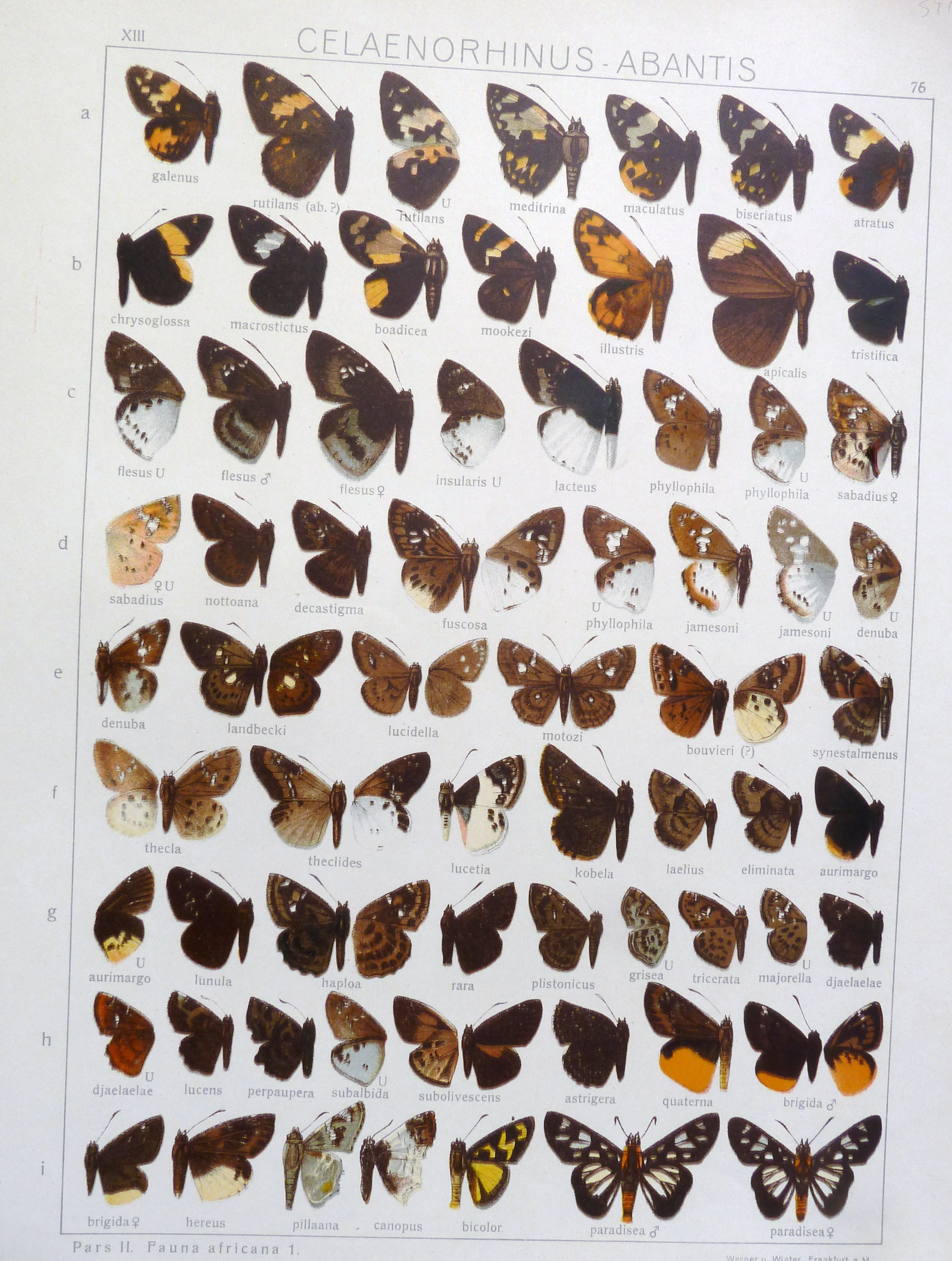
- as S.synestalmenus Karsch, 1893 e

Scientific classification
- Kingdom: Animalia
- Phylum: Arthropoda
- Clade: Pancrustacea
- Class: Insecta
- Order: Lepidoptera
- Family: Hesperiidae
- Genus: Sarangesa
- Species: S. laelius

Binomial name
- Sarangesa laelius (Mabille, 1877)

Synonyms
- List: Pterygospidea laelius Mabille, 1877; Sarangesa synestalmenus Karsch, 1893; Sarangesa tristis Rebel, 1914; Sarangesa laelioides Riley, 1921; Sarangesa coelius de Fleury, 1926

= Sarangesa laelius =

Species of butterfly

Sarangesa laelius, commonly known as the grey elfin, is a species of butterfly in the family Hesperiidae. It is found in Mauritania, Senegal, Gambia, Mali, Guinea, northern Ivory Coast, northern and central Ghana, Togo, northern Nigeria, southern Sudan, Uganda, Ethiopia, Kenya, Tanzania, Malawi, northern Zambia and Zimbabwe. The habitat consists of woodland and dry Guinea savanna.

The adults of both sexes are attracted to flowers.

Torben Larsen developed a species numbering system for his 2005 publication Butterflies of West Africa. This species is #1245. The 'Larsen' numbers have since been used with permission in A Sharp Eye on Butterflies of Ghana.
