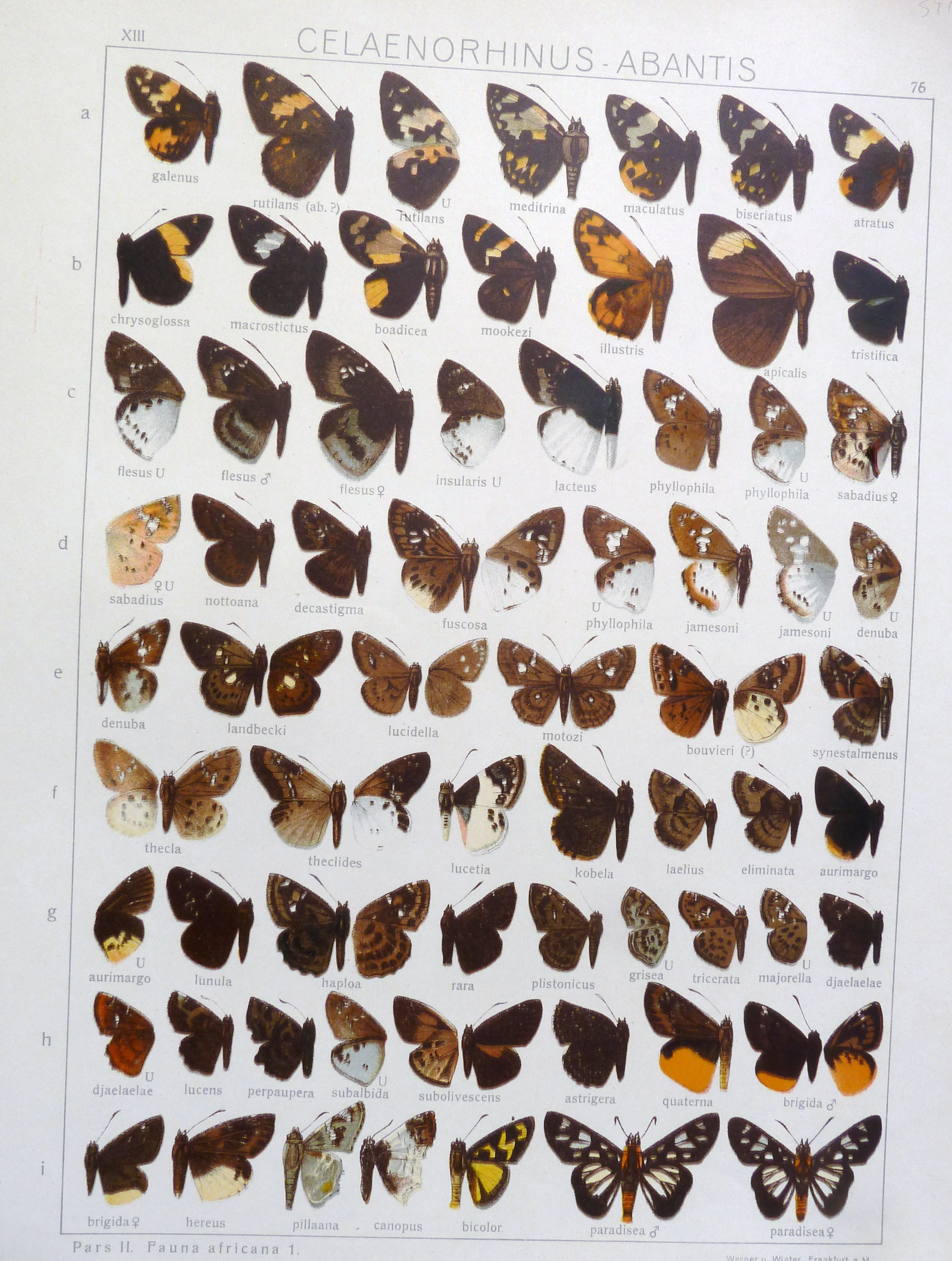

Scientific classification
- Domain: Eukaryota
- Kingdom: Animalia
- Phylum: Arthropoda
- Class: Insecta
- Order: Lepidoptera
- Family: Hesperiidae
- Genus: Apallaga
- Species: A. mokeezi

Binomial name
- Apallaga mokeezi (Wallengren, 1857)

Synonyms
- Pterygospidea mokeezi Wallengren, 1857; Apallaga separata Strand, 1911; Hesperia amaponda Trimen, 1862; Celaenorrhinus mokeezi (Wallengren, 1857)

= Apallaga mokeezi =

Species of butterfly

Apallaga mokeezi, also known as the large sprite, large flat or Christmas forester, is a species of butterfly in the family Hesperiidae. It is found in South Africa (from Transkei to KwaZulu-Natal and Transvaal) and Mozambique. The habitat consists coastal forests and montane forests.

The wingspan is 40–48 mm for males and 45–51 mm for females. Adults are on wing year-round in warmer areas with peaks in late summer and autumn.

The larvae feed on Isoglossa woodii (buckweed).

== Subspecies ==
- Apallaga mokeezi mokeezi - South Africa: from eastern Cape to the southern KwaZulu-Natal coast and midlands
- Apallaga mokeezi separata (Strand, 1911) - southern Mozambique, Eswatini, South Africa: Limpopo Province, Mpumalanga, KwaZulu-Natal
