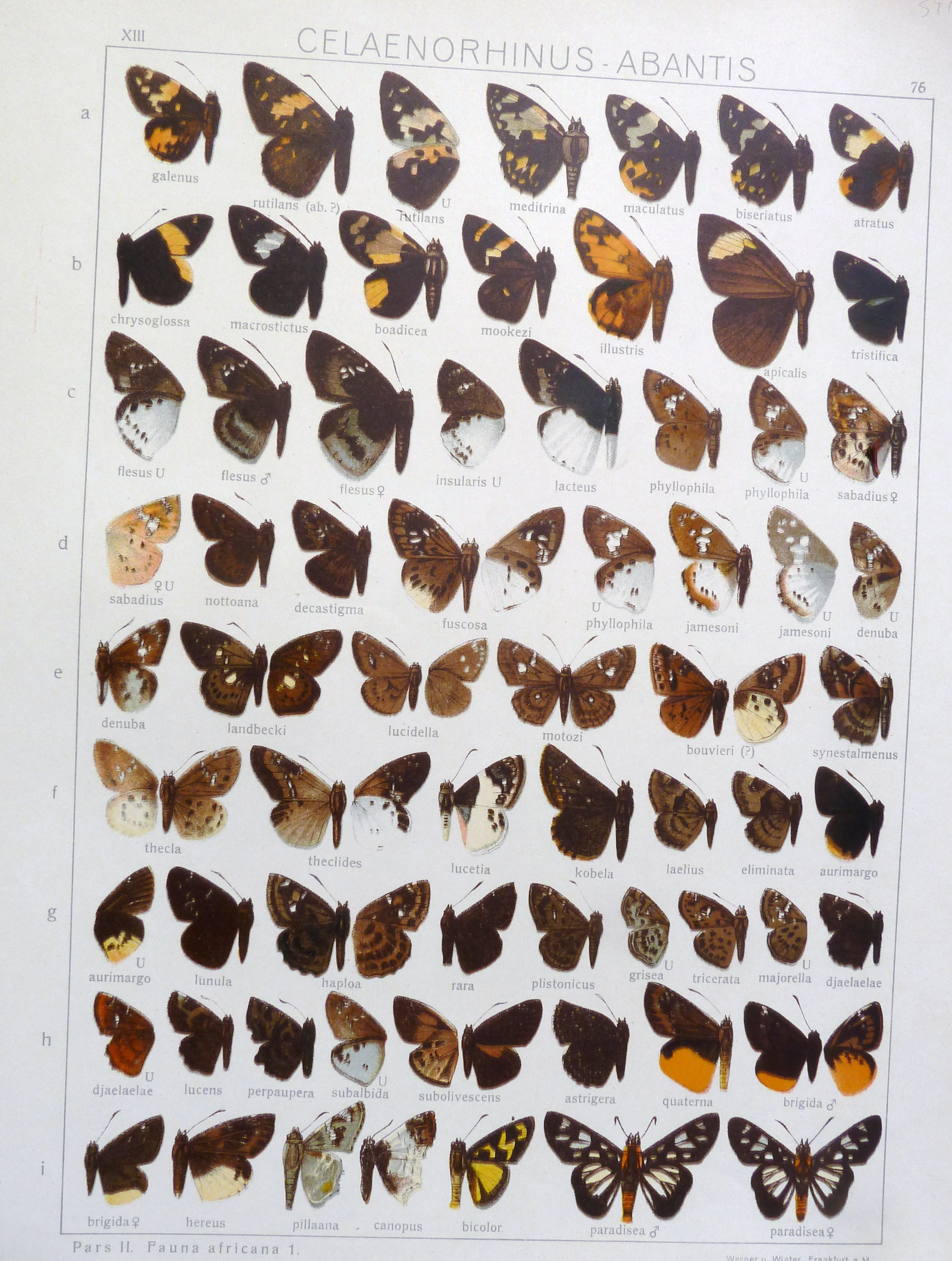

Scientific classification
- Kingdom: Animalia
- Phylum: Arthropoda
- Class: Insecta
- Order: Lepidoptera
- Family: Hesperiidae
- Genus: Sarangesa
- Species: S. tricerata

Binomial name
- Sarangesa tricerata (Mabille, 1891)

Synonyms
- Hyda tricerata Mabille, 1891

= Sarangesa tricerata =

Species of butterfly

Sarangesa tricerata, commonly known as the tricerate elfin, is a species of butterfly in the family Hesperiidae. It is found in Gambia, Guinea, Sierra Leone, Ivory Coast, Ghana, Togo, Nigeria, Cameroon, Gabon, the Republic of the Congo, the Central African Republic, the Democratic Republic of the Congo, and Tanzania. The habitat consists of dry forests.

Adult males are known to be attracted to bird droppings.

== Subspecies ==
- Sarangesa tricerata tricerata (Gambia, Sierra Leone, to Cameroon, Gabon, Democratic Republic of Congo)
- Sarangesa tricerata compacta Evans, 1951 (western Tanzania)
