= Sarangesa maculata =

Scientific classification
- Kingdom: Animalia
- Phylum: Arthropoda
- Class: Insecta
- Order: Lepidoptera
- Family: Hesperiidae
- Genus: Sarangesa
- Species: S. maculata

Binomial name
- Sarangesa maculata (Mabille, 1891)

Synonyms
- Sape maculata Mabille, 1891; Sarangesa subalbicans Bethune-Baker, 1906

Species of butterfly

Sarangesa maculata is a species of butterfly in the family Hesperiidae. It is found in Cameroon, the Democratic Republic of the Congo, Uganda, Kenya, Tanzania, Zambia, Malawi, Mozambique and Zimbabwe. The habitat consists of wooded savanna.

The larvae feed on Asystasia gangetica.
