= Sarangesa aza =

Scientific classification
- Kingdom: Animalia
- Phylum: Arthropoda
- Class: Insecta
- Order: Lepidoptera
- Family: Hesperiidae
- Genus: Sarangesa
- Species: S. aza

Binomial name
- Sarangesa aza Evans, 1951

Species of butterfly

Sarangesa aza is a species of butterfly in the family Hesperiidae. It is found in southern Sudan and north-western Tanzania.
