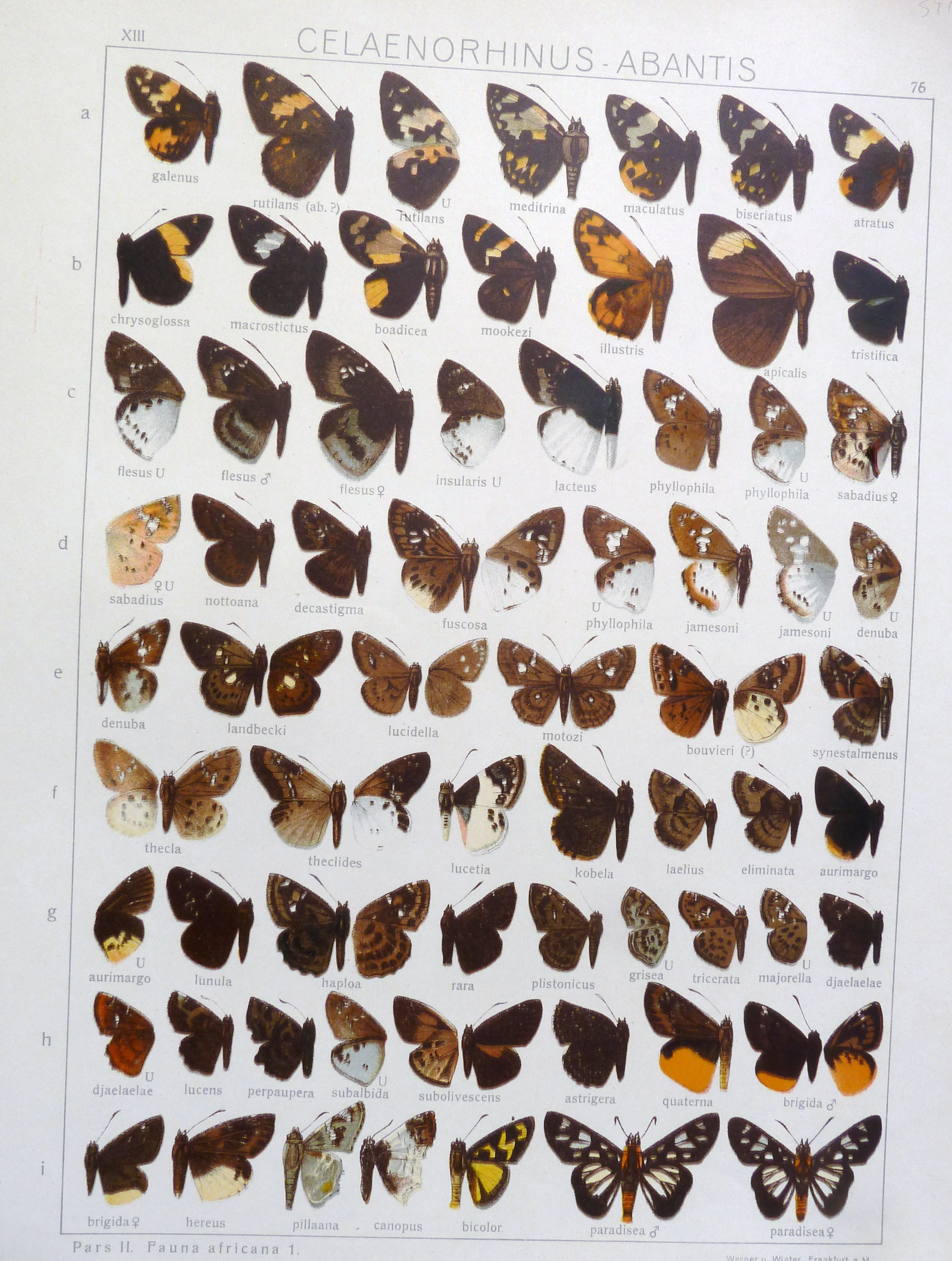
- in Seitz g misspelt haploa

Scientific classification
- Kingdom: Animalia
- Phylum: Arthropoda
- Class: Insecta
- Order: Lepidoptera
- Family: Hesperiidae
- Genus: Sarangesa
- Species: S. haplopa

Binomial name
- Sarangesa haplopa C. Swinhoe, 1907

= Sarangesa haplopa =

Species of butterfly

Sarangesa haplopa is a species of butterfly in the family Hesperiidae. It is found in the eastern part of the Democratic Republic of the Congo, Uganda, western Kenya, Tanzania and Malawi.
