= Sarangesa princei =

Scientific classification
- Kingdom: Animalia
- Phylum: Arthropoda
- Class: Insecta
- Order: Lepidoptera
- Family: Hesperiidae
- Genus: Sarangesa
- Species: S. princei

Binomial name
- Sarangesa princei Karsch, 1896

Synonyms
- Sarangesa tsava Bethune-Baker, 1906

Species of butterfly

Sarangesa princei is a species of butterfly in the family Hesperiidae. It is found in eastern Kenya and northern Tanzania.
