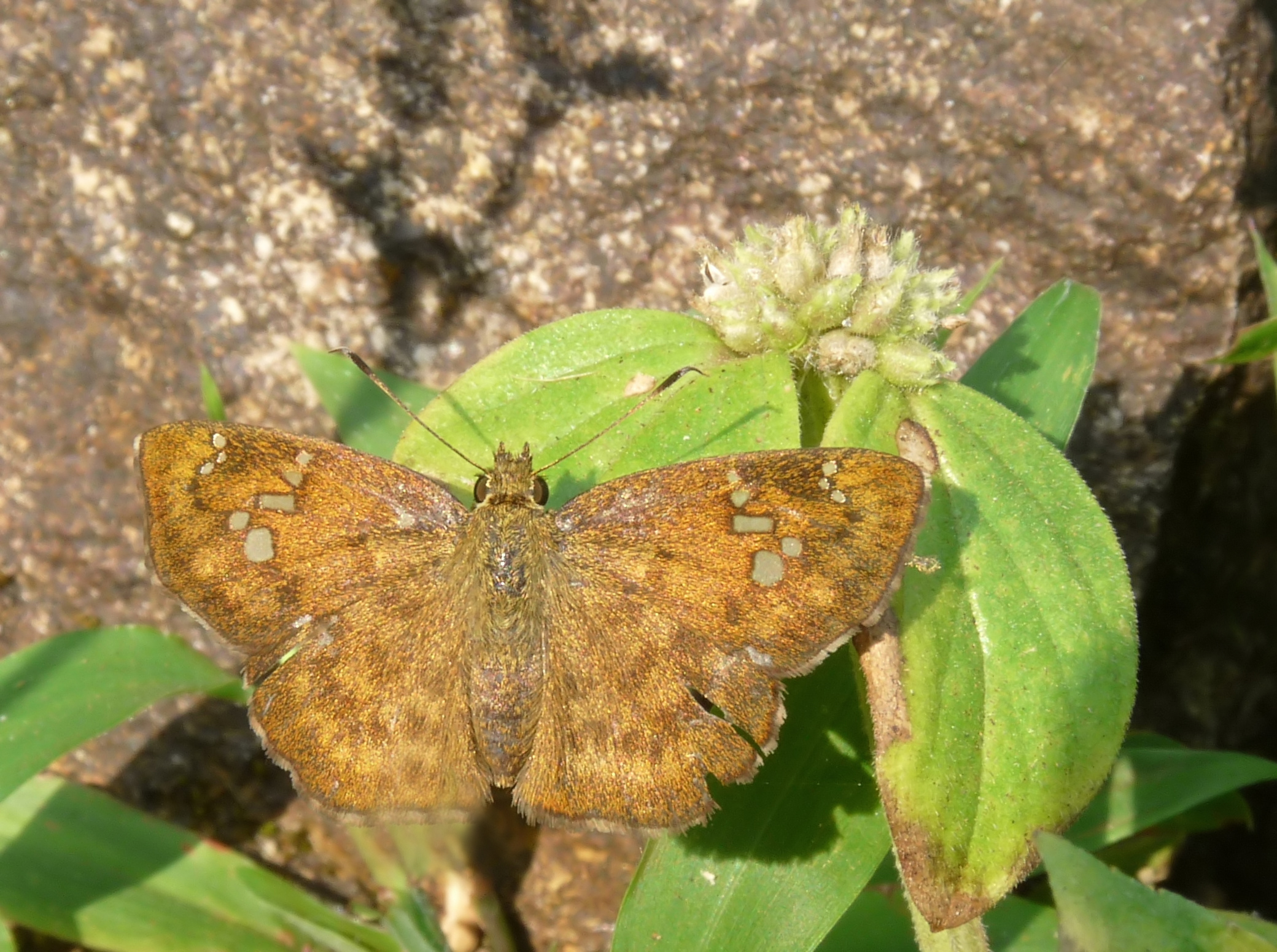
- Male
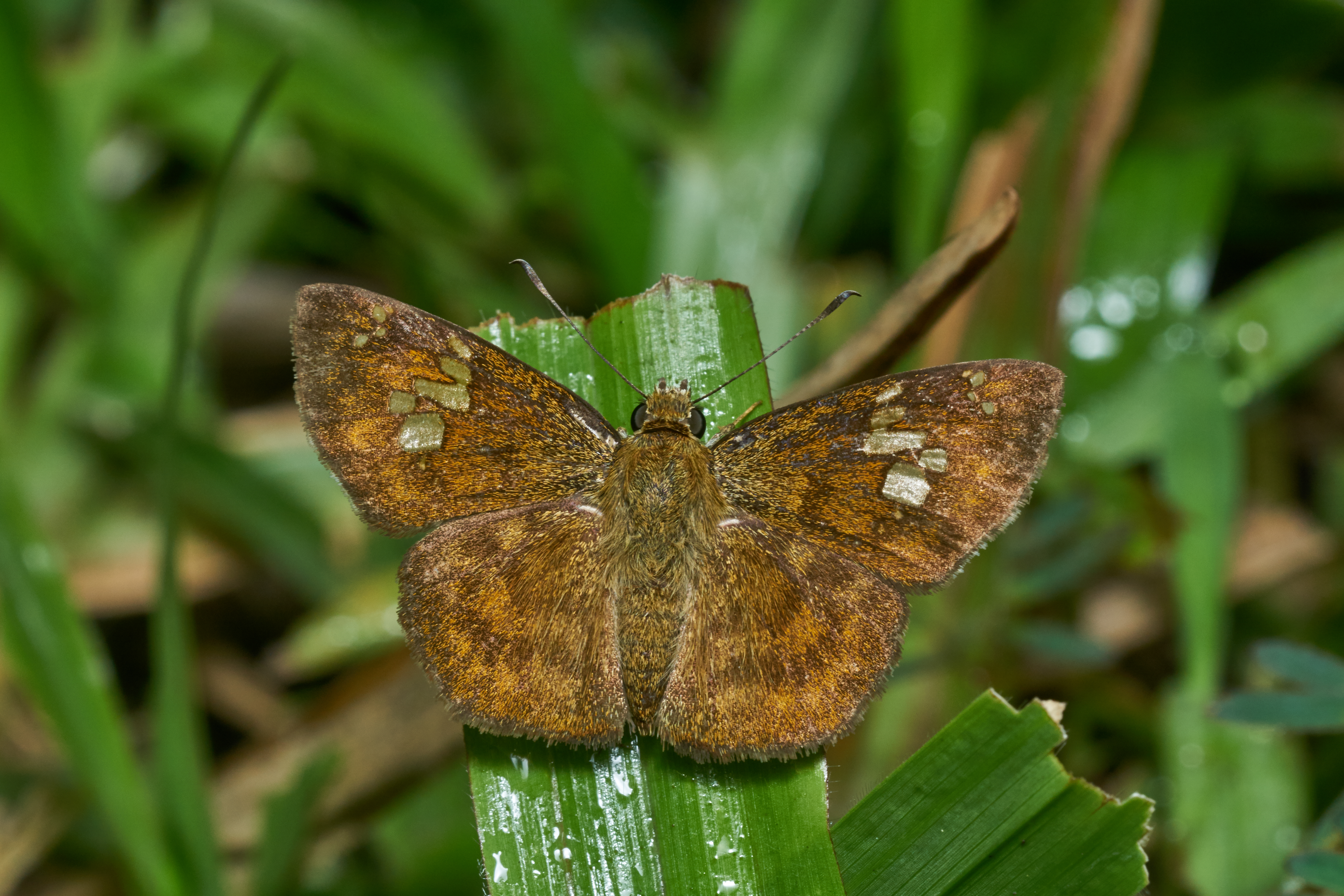
- Female

Scientific classification
- Kingdom: Animalia
- Phylum: Arthropoda
- Class: Insecta
- Order: Lepidoptera
- Family: Hesperiidae
- Genus: Pseudocoladenia
- Species: P. dan

Binomial name
- Pseudocoladenia dan (Fabricius, 1787)

Synonyms
- Coladenia dan

= Pseudocoladenia dan =

Fulvous pied flat

Species of butterfly

Pseudocoladenia dan, commonly known as the fulvous pied flat, is an Indomalayan species of butterfly in the family Hesperiidae. It is found from India to southeast Asia.

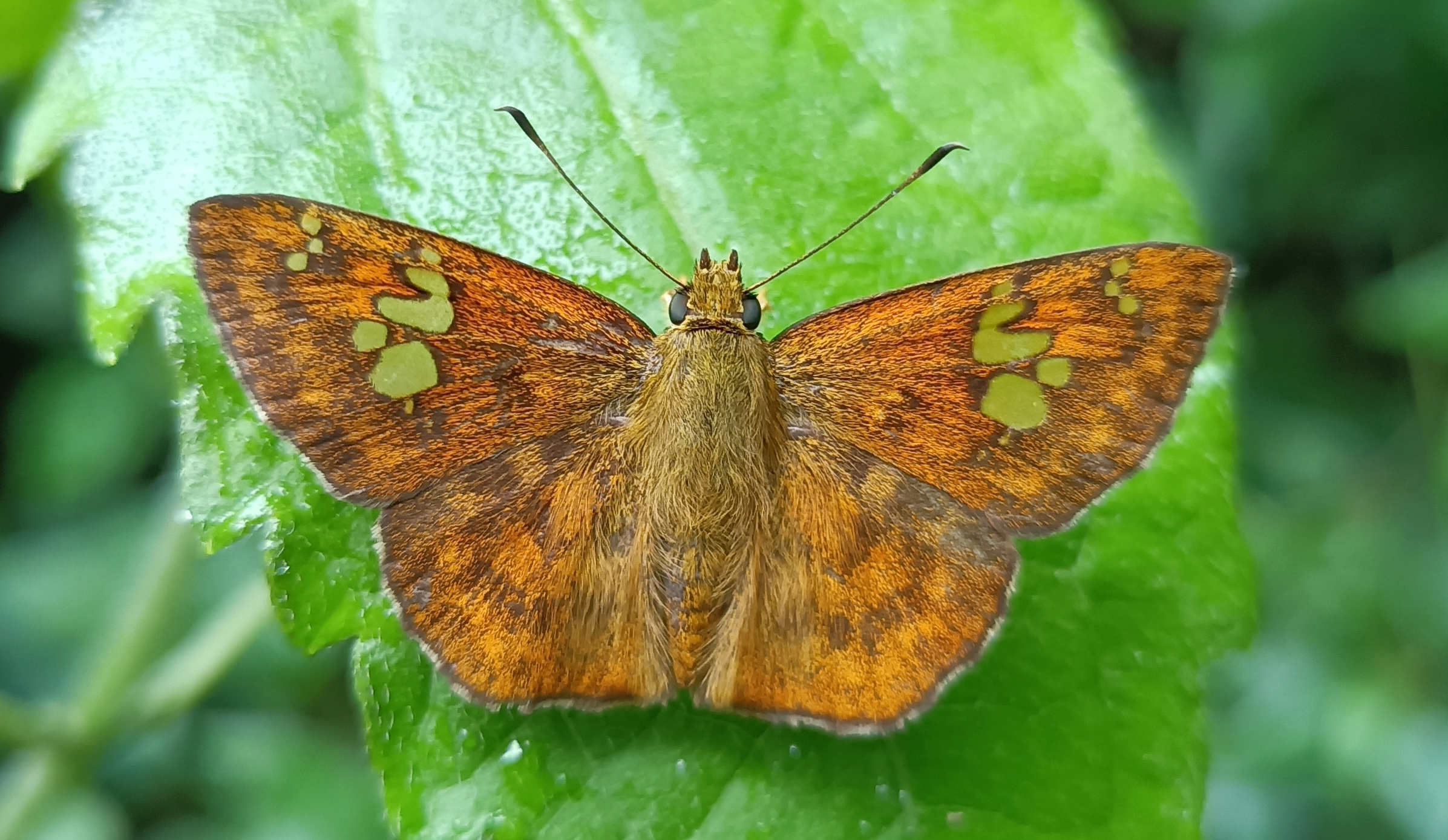
Pseudocoladenia dan ( fulvous pied flat ) photo from wayanad Kerala

== Description ==
Male. Upperside rufous-brown. Forewing with three semi-hyaline small white sub-apical spots from near the costa, the middle one the smallest and well inwards; in some examples one or both of the lower spots are absent; a large semi-hyaline spot inside the cell, near its end, its inner side square, its outer side deeply excavated, with a small spot between it and the costa, a small round spot near the base of the second median interspace, a much larger round spot in the middle of the first median interspace, and a minute spot (sometimes two) below them in the middle of the interno-median interspace, all these spots slightly tinged with ochreous, and varying much in size in diticrent examples; sometimes the large excavated spot in the cell is split into two, sometimes represented by a small round spot immediately below the sub-costal vein near the end of the cell, and sometimes it is entirely absent; there are some brownish indistinct marks on the wing, one in the interno-median interspace before the middle, a series of conjoined discal marks and an indistinct outer marginal band. Hindwing with a brown spot at the end of the cell, a discal brown macular band, corresponding in its curve to the outer margin, and a marginal band. Cilia of both wings brown. Underside like the upperside, but duller in colour. Forewing similarly marked. Hindwing with the brown bands somewhat more distinct, the cell spot with a brown spot on each side of it, and a sub-basal brown spot. Female similar to the male.

— Charles Swinhoe, Lepidoptera Indica. Vol. X

== Former Subspecies ==
Prior to revision by Hoe et al. in 2023, the species contained:

- P. d. dan (Fabricius, 1787) - India
- P. d. fatih (Kollar, [1844]) - India (Kashmir), Nepal.
- P. d. fabia (Evans, 1949) - Assam, Bhutan, Sikkim, Myanmar, Thailand, Indo-China, South China (Anhui, Fujian, Guangdong, Guangxi, Hainan, Yunnan)
- P. d. dhyana (Fruhstorfer, 1909) - Myanmar, Thailand, Malay Peninsula
- P. d. sumatrana (Fruhstorfer, 1909) - West Sumatra
- P. d. fulvescens (Elwes & Edwards, 1897)
- P. d. eacus (Latreille, [1824]) - Java, Lesser Sunda Islands, Sulawesi
- P. d. sadakoe (Sonan & Miltono, 1936) - Taiwan

== Biology ==
The larva feeds on Achyranthes aspera.
