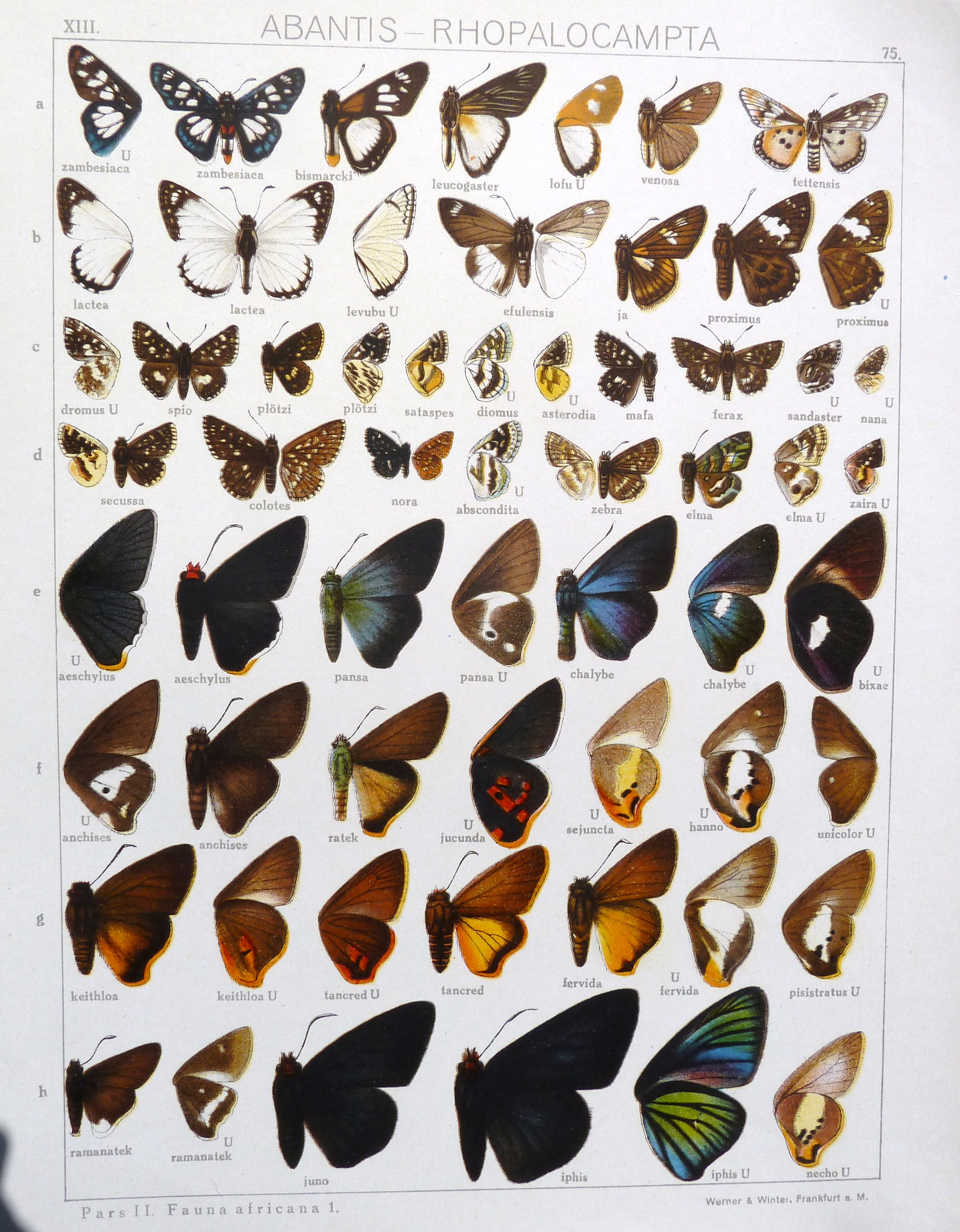

Scientific classification
- Kingdom: Animalia
- Phylum: Arthropoda
- Class: Insecta
- Order: Lepidoptera
- Family: Hesperiidae
- Genus: Alenia
- Species: A. sandaster

Binomial name
- Alenia sandaster (Trimen, 1868)

Synonyms
- Pyrgus sandaster Trimen, 1868

= Alenia sandaster =

Species of butterfly

Alenia sandaster, the Karoo dancer or Karoo sandman, is a species of butterfly in the family Hesperiidae. It is only known from the arid Nama Karoo of the eastern part of the West Cape, the central North Cape and the western East Cape in South Africa.

The wingspan is 22–27 mm for males and 26–28 mm for females. Adults are on wing from August to January (with a peak from September to November). There is one extended generation per year.

The larvae feed on Blepharis capensis and Barleria species.
