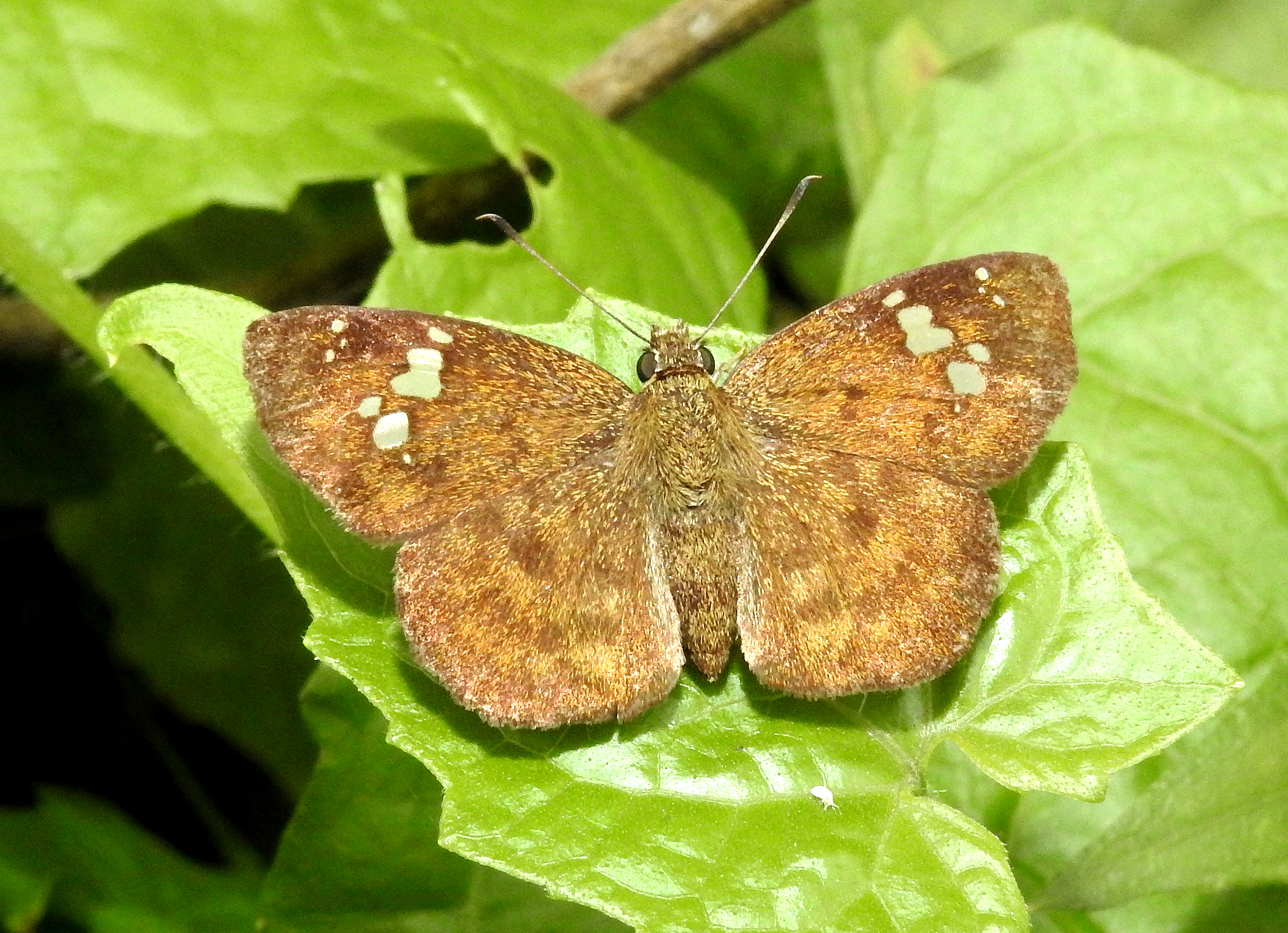
- Pseudocoladenia dan
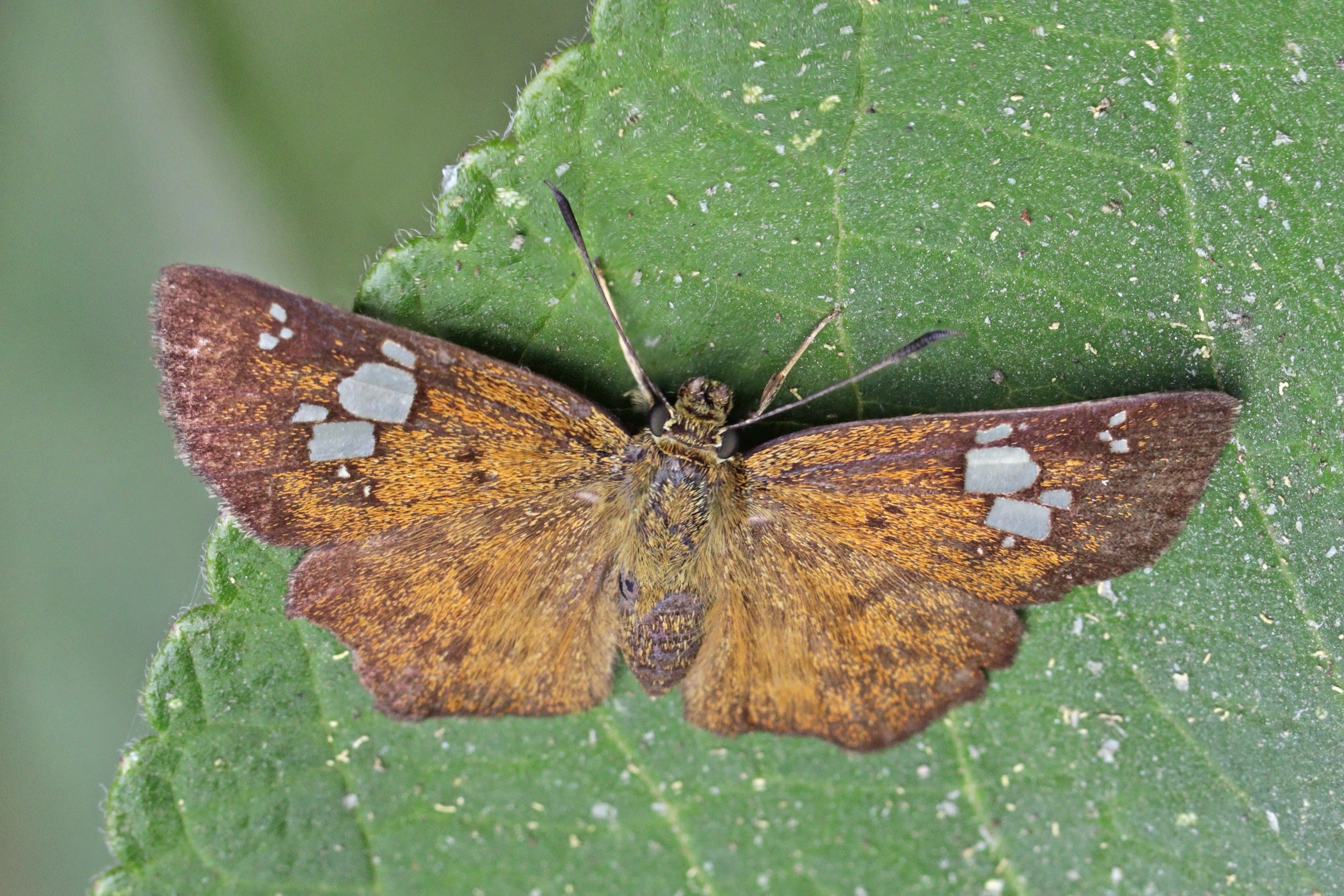
- Pseudocoladenia fatih

Scientific classification
- Kingdom: Animalia
- Phylum: Arthropoda
- Class: Insecta
- Order: Lepidoptera
- Family: Hesperiidae
- Subfamily: Tagiadinae
- Tribe: Celaenorrhinini
- Genus: Pseudocoladenia; Shirôzu & Saigusa, 1962

= Pseudocoladenia =

Genus of butterflies

Pseudocoladenia is an Indomalayan genus of spread-winged skippers in the family Hesperiidae.

== Species ==
- Pseudocoladenia celebica (Fruhstorfer, 1909) - Sulawesi
- Pseudocoladenia dan (Fabricius, 1787) - India
- Pseudocoladenia dea (Leech, 1894) - China (Zhejiang, Anhui, Hubei, Sichuan)
- Pseudocoladenia decora Evans, 1939 - China
- Pseudocoladenia eacus (Latreille, [1824]) - Indonesia (Java, Lesser Sunda Islands, Sulawesi), Myanmar, Malaysia, Thailand [from subspecies]
  - P. e. eacus (Latreille, [1824]) - Indonesia
  - P. e. sumatrana (Fruhstorfer, 1909) - Indonesia (West Sumatra)
  - P. e. dhyana (Fruhstorfer, 1909) - Myanmar, Malaysia, Thailand
- Pseudocoladenia fabia (Evans, 1949) - Bhutan, China (Anhui, Fujian, Guangdong, Guangxi, Hainan, Yunnan), India (Assam, Sikkim), Myanmar, Thailand [from subspecies]
- Pseudocoladenia fatih (Kollar, 1844) -India (Kashmir), Nepal [from subspecies]
- Pseudocoladenia fatua (Evans, 1949) - Bhutan, India (Sikkim, Assam), Myanmar, Tibet
- Pseudocoladenia festa (Evans, 1949) - Bhutan, India (Assam, Sikkim), China (Yunnan, Sichuan), Myanmar
- Pseudocoladenia fulvescens (Elwes & Edwards, 1897) - Malaysia (Borneo) [from subspecies]
- Pseudocoladenia pinsbukana (Shimonoya & Murayama, 1976) - Taiwan
- Pseudocoladenia sadakoe (Sonan & Miltono, 1936) - Taiwan [from subspecies]
- Pseudocoladenia yunnana Fan, Cao & Hou 2023 - China (Yunnan)
