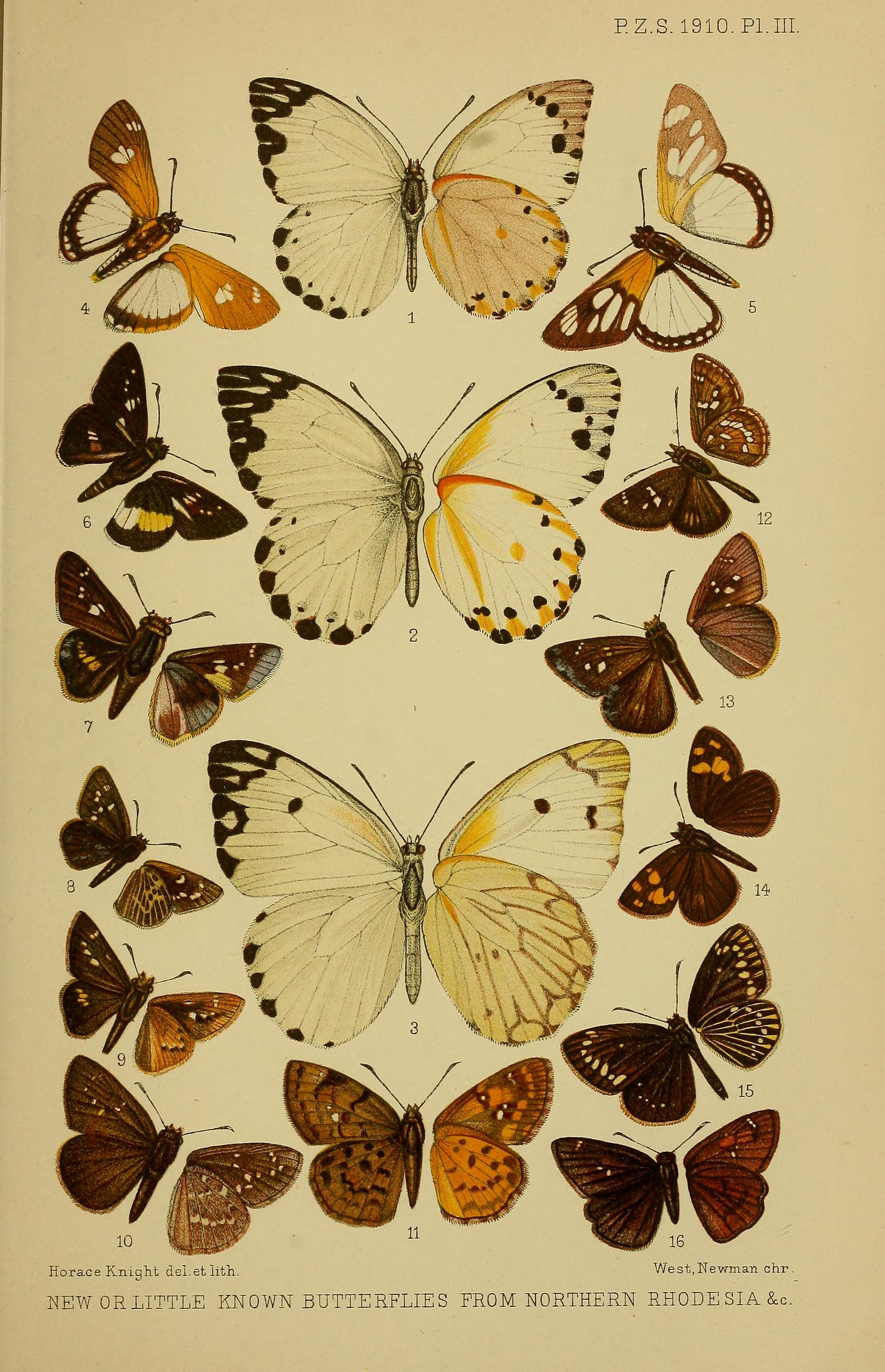
- Sarangesa maxima figure 11

Scientific classification
- Kingdom: Animalia
- Phylum: Arthropoda
- Class: Insecta
- Order: Lepidoptera
- Family: Hesperiidae
- Genus: Sarangesa
- Species: S. maxima

Binomial name
- Sarangesa maxima Neave, 1910

Synonyms
- Sarangesa maxima f. flava Riley, 1921

= Sarangesa maxima =

Species of butterfly

Sarangesa maxima is a species of butterfly in the family Hesperiidae. It is found in the Democratic Republic of the Congo (Katanga Province) and Zambia. The habitat consists of Brachystegia woodland.
