= Sarangesa motozioides =

Scientific classification
- Kingdom: Animalia
- Phylum: Arthropoda
- Class: Insecta
- Order: Lepidoptera
- Family: Hesperiidae
- Genus: Sarangesa
- Species: S. motozioides

Binomial name
- Sarangesa motozioides Holland, 1892

Species of butterfly

Sarangesa motozioides is a species of butterfly in the family Hesperiidae. It is found in Gabon.
