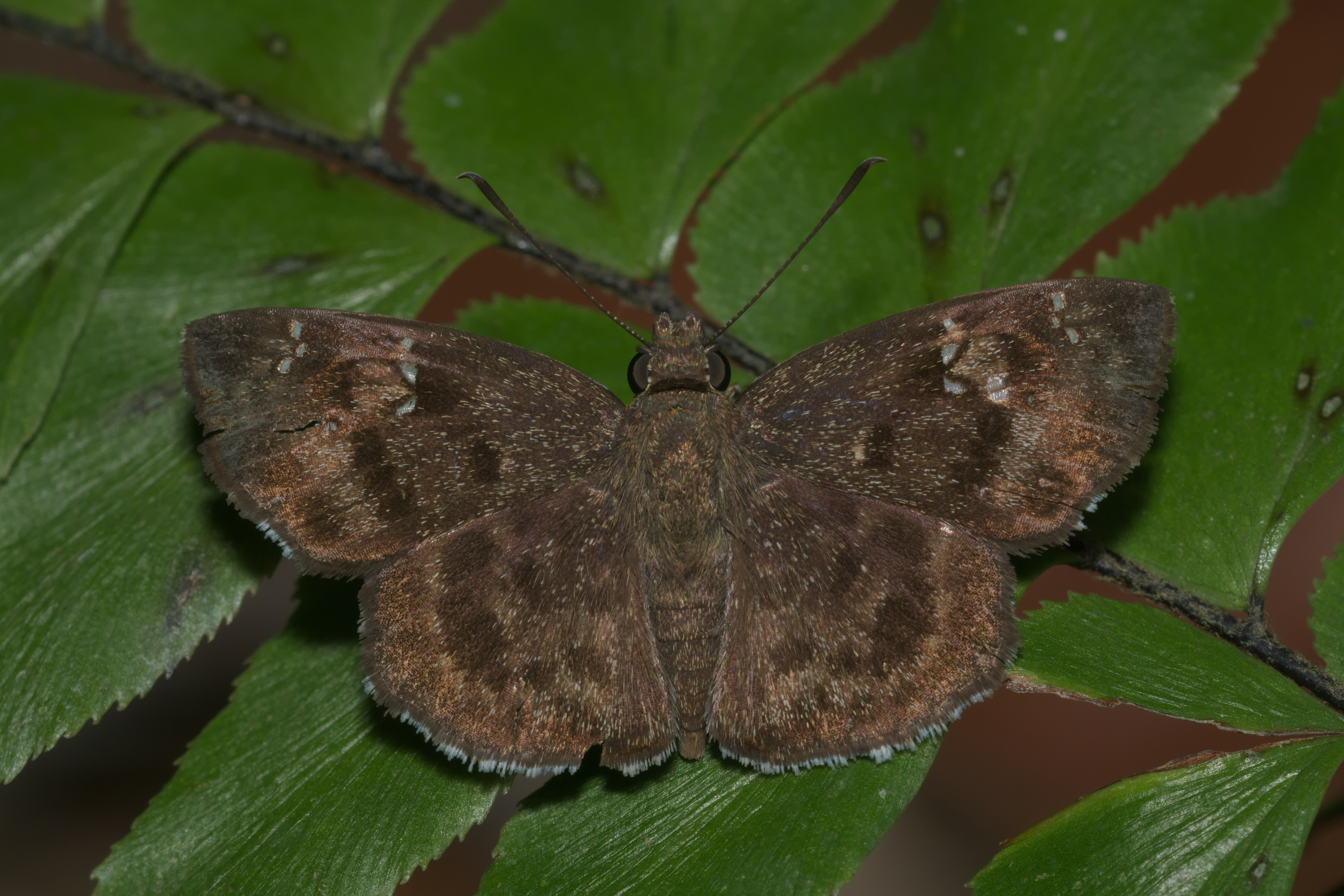
- in Kerala

Scientific classification
- Domain: Eukaryota
- Kingdom: Animalia
- Phylum: Arthropoda
- Class: Insecta
- Order: Lepidoptera
- Family: Hesperiidae
- Genus: Sarangesa
- Species: S. dasahara

Binomial name
- Sarangesa dasahara (Moore, 1865)

Synonyms
- Nisoniades dasahara Moore, [1866]; Hesperia philippus Mabille, 1883; Sarangesa albicilia Moore, [1881]

= Sarangesa dasahara =

Common small flat

Species of butterfly

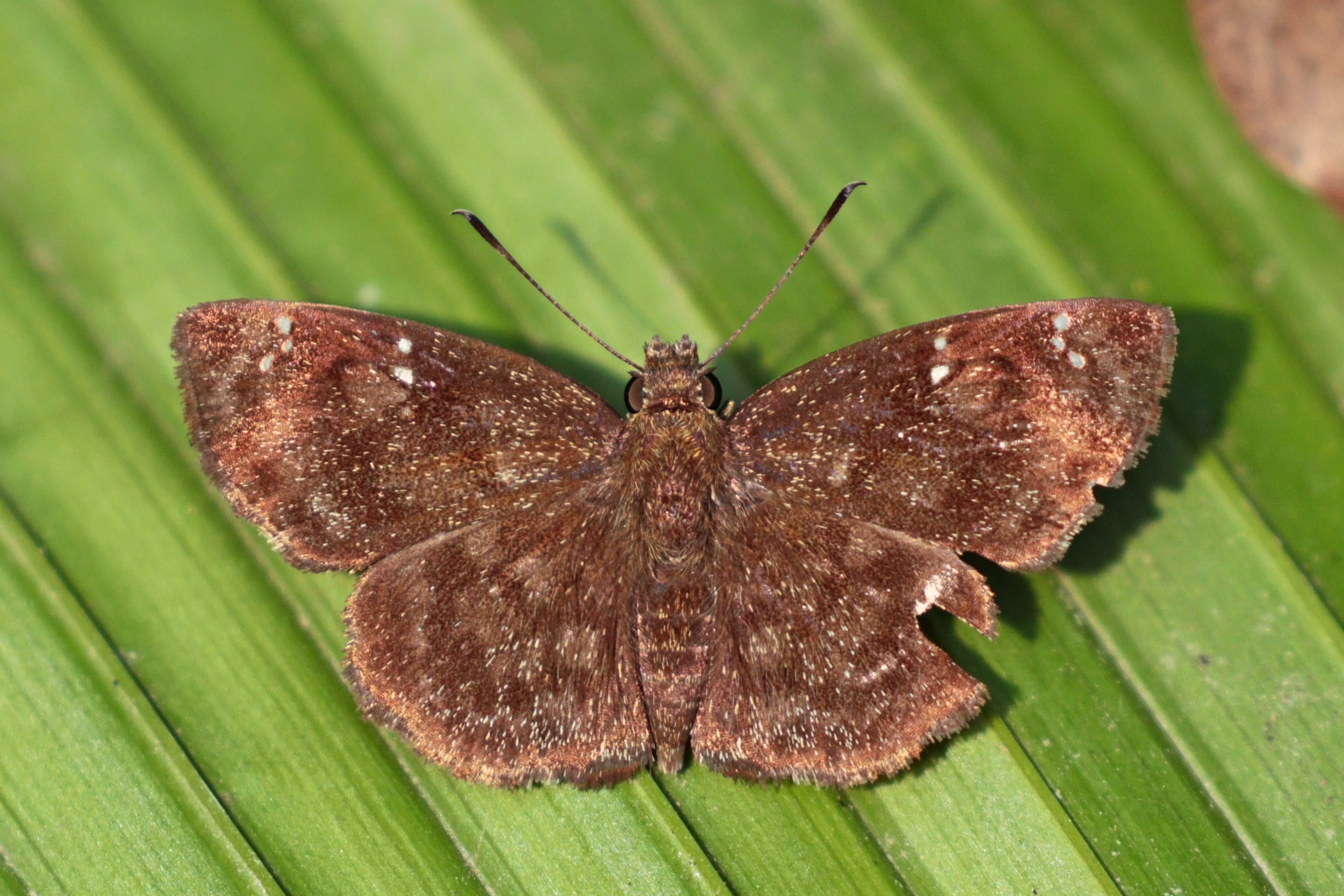
S. d. dasahara, Chitwan, Nepal

Sarangesa dasahara, also known as the common small flat, is a species of butterfly in the family Hesperiidae. It is found in the Indomalayan realm.

== Description ==
Male. Upper side coloured like Sarangesa purendra, a little darker. Forewing with three similar sub-apical dots, a minute dot at the upper end of the cell, with another above it, a very indistinct discal band and indications of a similar middle band, both very slightly darker than the ground colour. Hindwing with indications of a discal and a marginal band. Underside much paler, the bands consequently more pronounced, the hindwing with some grey suffusion between the bands and along the abdominal area, caused by minute greyish-white scaling. Cilia as in S. purendra. Female similar to the male, but in the forewing there is an additional dot below the cell, all three being in a line, and there is a dot in the second median interspace a little before its middle. Underside similarly marked, the coloration and bands as in the male. Antennae, palpi, body and legs much as in S. purendra.

— Charles Swinhoe, Lepidoptera Indica. Vol. X

The common small flat has a wingspan or around 30–35 mm. It is a dull black or brown butterfly with a semi-transparent spot on the wings and sometimes with no visible spots. The underside of the wings is grey brown with diffused dark spots. The male and female are similar in shape and colour and with hardly any differentiation. Both sexes of the flat are similar in appearance, being dull brownish black above and greyer in colour below. The butterflies have small, semi-transparent discal, cell and apical spots. The dark spots on the underside of the forewing are large, dark and diffused.

== Status, distribution and habitat ==
This species is most commonly visible at the end of the rainy season, but sparsely found in the post-monsoon months. It is common but not abundant in most habitats. The spotted small flat (Sarangesa purendra), though, is more common in the arid regions. It occurs in openings and edges in both the evergreen and semi-evergreen forests, deciduous forests, and scrub & short grassland savannahs. It is found in the Deccan plains and also in the hills, but more frequently found at lower elevations. Except for the very dry north-west India, it occurs commonly throughout the country, in Sri Lanka and in the Indo-Chinese region.

== Habits ==
The butterfly though tiny, flies extraordinarily fast but in an erratic and jerky fashion. Though the flight seems jerky and erratic, the butterfly lands smoothly on the substratum, and that too suddenly. It fight is always close to the ground and has the habit of sometimes returning to the same spot for perching.

It feeds on flowers of herbs and small bushes and also rarely on birds' droppings and wet rocks for minerals. It always keeps its wings spread. It almost always rests on the underside of leaves, but basks on the upperside with its wings fully spread.

== Larval host plants ==
Its larval host plants are Acanthaceae herbs and small shrubs; Asystasia species and Blepharis asperrima. These species grow in neglected places around human habitations, in deciduous forests and openings in evergreen forests.

== Subspecies ==
- Sarangesa dasahara dasahara (north-western Himalaya to Myanmar, Vietnam, Laos, Thailand, southern Yunnan)
- Sarangesa dasahara albicilia Moore, [1881] (Sri Lanka)
- Sarangesa dasahara davidsoni Swinhoe, 1912 (India: Maharashtra)

== See also ==
- Hesperiidae
- List of butterflies of India (Hesperiidae)
