= Apallaga pooanus =

Bitje sprite

Scientific classification
- Kingdom: Animalia
- Phylum: Arthropoda
- Class: Insecta
- Order: Lepidoptera
- Family: Hesperiidae
- Genus: Apallaga
- Species: A. pooanus

Binomial name
- Apallaga pooanus Aurivillius, 1910

Synonyms
- Celaenorrhinus bitjena Evans, 1937; Celaenorrhinus pooanus Aurivillius, 1910

Species of butterfly

Apallaga pooanus, commonly known as the Bitje sprite, is a species of butterfly in the family Hesperiidae. It is found in Nigeria (the Cross River loop), Cameroon, Bioko, Gabon and possibly the Democratic Republic of the Congo (from the north-east to the Ituri Forest). The habitat consists of forests.

Adults have been recorded feeding on flowers of Mussaenda species.
