= Apallaga =

Scientific classification
- Kingdom: Animalia
- Phylum: Arthropoda
- Clade: Pancrustacea
- Class: Insecta
- Order: Lepidoptera
- Family: Hesperiidae
- Subfamily: Tagiadinae
- Tribe: Celaenorrhinini
- Genus: Apallaga; Strand, 1911

Genus of butterflies

Apallaga is a genus of skippers in the family Hesperiidae.

== Species ==
Recognised species in the genus Apallaga include:

- Apallaga belcastroi (Libert, 2014)
- Apallaga fulgens (Mabille, 1877)
- Apallaga leona (Berger, 1975)
- Apallaga mokeezi (Wallengren, 1857)
- Apallaga opalinus (Butler, 1900)
- Apallaga oreas Libert, 2014
- Apallaga pooanus (Aurivillius, 1910)
- Apallaga rutilans (Mabille, 1877)

The female of the newly discovered species Apallaga belcastroi is illustrated in A Sharp Eye on Butterflies of Ghana.
