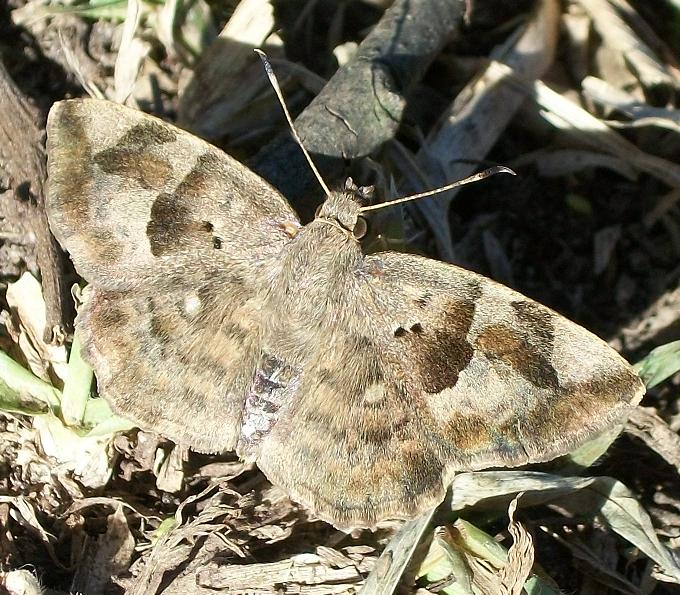
- Winter form

Scientific classification
- Kingdom: Animalia
- Phylum: Arthropoda
- Class: Insecta
- Order: Lepidoptera
- Family: Hesperiidae
- Genus: Sarangesa
- Species: S. motozi

Binomial name
- Sarangesa motozi (Wallengren, 1857)

Synonyms
- Pterygospidea motozi Wallengren, 1857; Nisoniades pato Trimen, 1862; Sape ophthalmica Mabille, 1891; Sape pertusa Mabille, 1891; Sarangesa helmi Karsch, 1896; Sarangesa ophthalmica ophthalmicodes Strand, 1912

= Sarangesa motozi =

Species of butterfly

Sarangesa motozi, also known as the forest elfin or elfin skipper, is a species of butterfly in the family Hesperiidae. It is native to southern and eastern Africa.

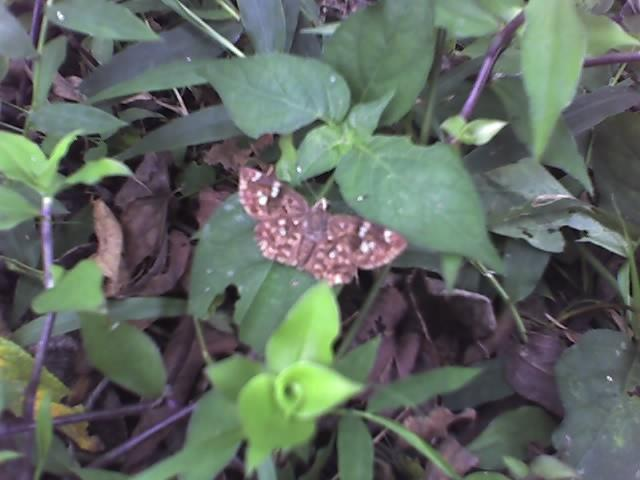
Summer form

== Description ==
The wingspan is 36–38 mm (1.4–1.5 in) for males and 38–40 mm (1.5–1.6 in) for females. The upper surface of the wings is variegated brown and grey.

== Distribution ==
This species is found from Cape Town and the eastern side of South Africa, to Zimbabwe, Botswana, Angola, and to Kenya and Ethiopia.

== Life cycle ==
=== Larvae ===
The larvae feed on Barleria, Justicia and Peristrophe species, including Peristrophe hensii.

=== Adults ===
Adults are on wing year-round, although they are scarcer in the dry season.
