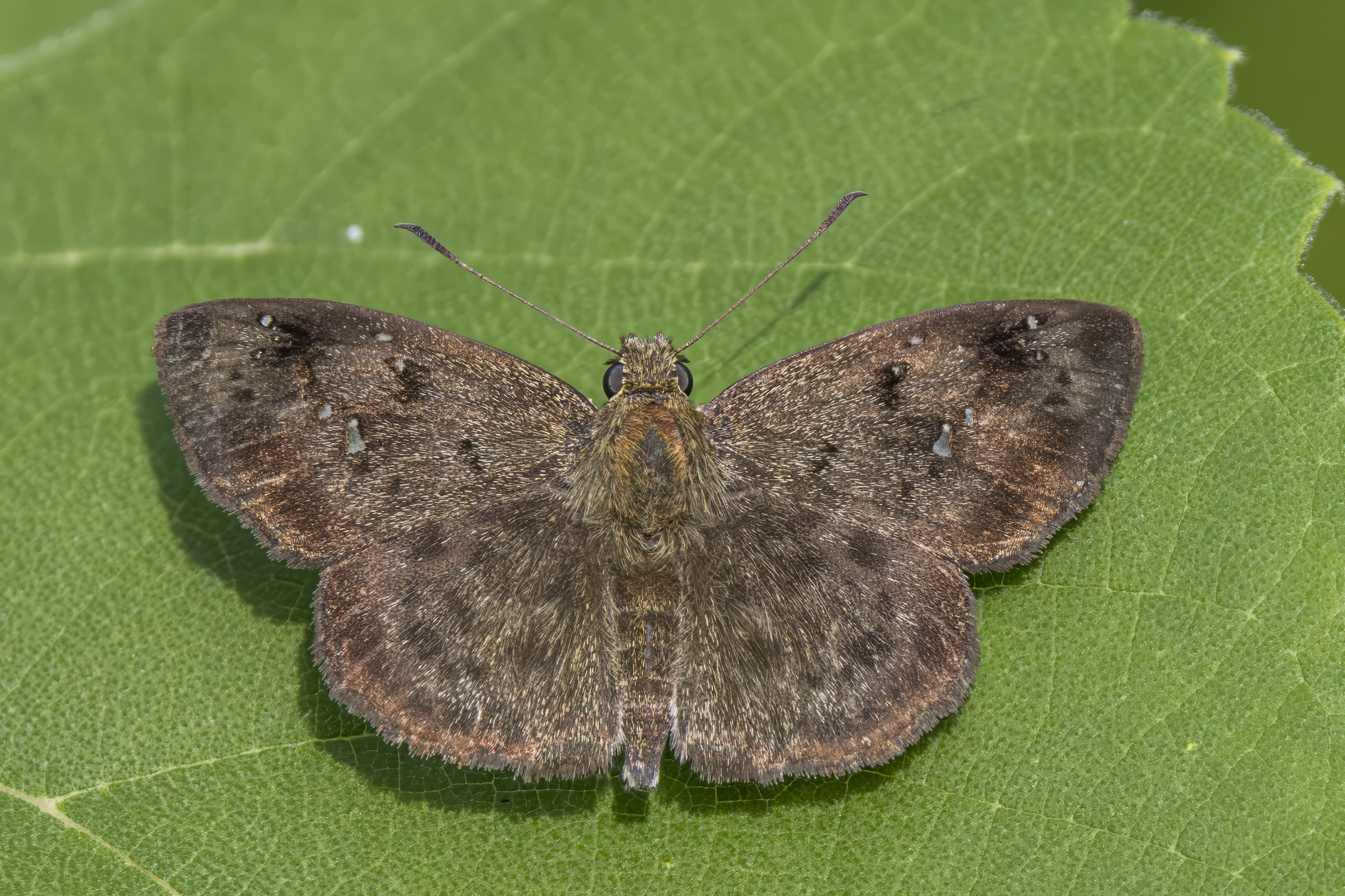
- male S. t. thecla in Ghana

Scientific classification
- Kingdom: Animalia
- Phylum: Arthropoda
- Clade: Pancrustacea
- Class: Insecta
- Order: Lepidoptera
- Family: Hesperiidae
- Genus: Sarangesa
- Species: S. thecla

Binomial name
- Sarangesa thecla (Plötz, 1879)

Synonyms
- Antigonus thecla Plötz, 1879; Sape semialba Mabille, 1891

= Sarangesa thecla =

Common elfin

Species of butterfly

Sarangesa thecla, also known as the common elfin, is a species of butterfly in the family Hesperiidae. It is found in Guinea, Sierra Leone, Liberia, Ivory Coast, Ghana, Togo, Nigeria, Cameroon, Gabon, the Republic of the Congo, the Central African Republic, the Democratic Republic of the Congo, Uganda, Kenya and Tanzania. The habitat consists of dry semi-deciduous forests.

Adults of both sexes are attracted to flowers and males are also attracted to bird droppings.

== Subspecies ==
- Sarangesa thecla thecla - western Guinea, Sierra Leone, Liberia, Ivory Coast, Ghana, Togo, Nigeria, Cameroon, Gabon, Congo, Central African Republic, Democratic Republic of Congo
- Sarangesa thecla mabira Evans, 1956 - eastern Democratic Republic of Congo, Uganda, western Kenya, north-western Tanzania

Torben Larsen developed a species numbering system for his 2005 publication Butterflies of West Africa. The nominate subspecies is #1250. The 'Larsen' numbers have since been used with permission in A Sharp Eye on Butterflies of Ghana.
