= Sarangesa majorella =

Scientific classification
- Kingdom: Animalia
- Phylum: Arthropoda
- Clade: Pancrustacea
- Class: Insecta
- Order: Lepidoptera
- Family: Hesperiidae
- Genus: Sarangesa
- Species: S. majorella

Binomial name
- Sarangesa majorella (Mabille, 1891)

Synonyms
- Hyda majorella Mabille, 1891; Sarangesa exprompta Holland, 1893

Species of butterfly

Sarangesa majorella, commonly known as the lesser blue-dusted elfin, is a species of butterfly in the family Hesperiidae. It is found in Guinea, Sierra Leone, Liberia, Ivory Coast, Ghana, Togo, Nigeria, Cameroon, the Republic of the Congo and the Central African Republic. The habitat consists of forests.

Torben Larsen developed a species numbering system for his 2005 publication Butterflies of West Africa. This species is #1248. The 'Larsen' numbers have since been used with permission in A Sharp Eye on Butterflies of Ghana.
