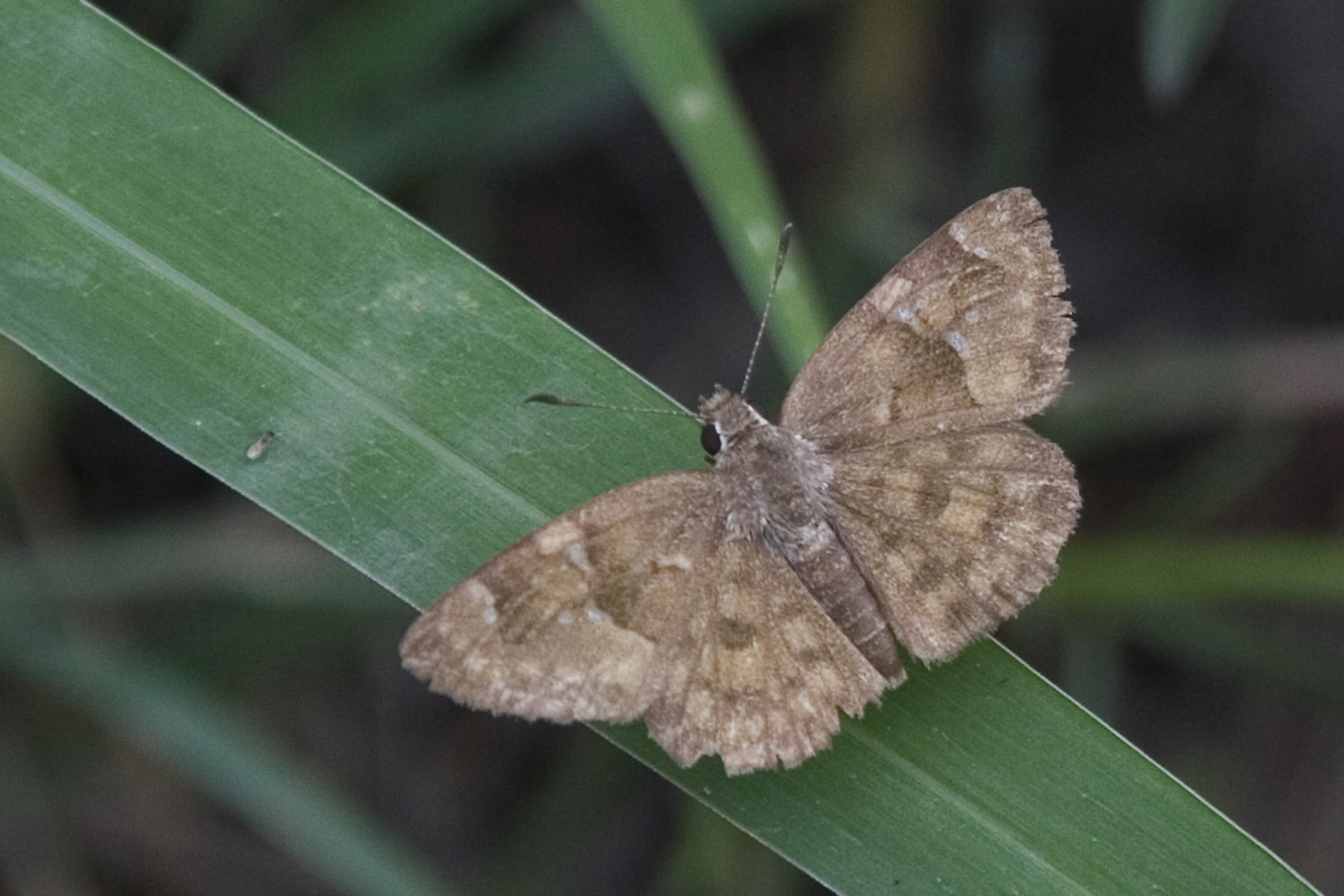
- Sarangesa phidyle

Scientific classification
- Kingdom: Animalia
- Phylum: Arthropoda
- Clade: Pancrustacea
- Class: Insecta
- Order: Lepidoptera
- Family: Hesperiidae
- Tribe: Celaenorrhinini
- Genus: Sarangesa; Moore, 1881

Synonyms
- Hyda Mabille, 1890; Sape Mabille, 1891; Tabraca Holland, 1896; Ulva Lindsey, 1925

= Sarangesa =

Genus of butterflies

Sarangesa is a genus of skippers in the family Hesperiidae. Most of the species in the genus are found in the Afrotropical realm, while a few are in the Indomalayan realm.

== Species ==
- Sarangesa astrigera Butler, 1893
- Sarangesa aza Evans, 1951
- Sarangesa bouvieri (Mabille, 1877)
- Sarangesa brigida (Plötz, 1879)
- Sarangesa dasahara Moore, [1866]
- Sarangesa gaerdesi Evans, 1949
- Sarangesa haplopa Swinhoe, 1907
- Sarangesa laelius (Mabille, 1877)
- Sarangesa lucidella (Mabille, 1891)
- Sarangesa lunula Druce, 1910
- Sarangesa maculata (Mabille, 1891)
- Sarangesa majorella (Mabille, 1891)
- Sarangesa maxima Neave, 1910
- Sarangesa motozi (Wallengren, 1857)
- Sarangesa motozioides Holland, 1892
- Sarangesa pandaensis Joicey & Talbot, 1921
- Sarangesa penningtoni Evans, 1951
- Sarangesa phidyle (Walker, 1870)
- Sarangesa princei Karsch, 1896
- Sarangesa purendra Moore, 1882
- Sarangesa ruona Evans, 1937
- Sarangesa sati de Nicéville, 1891
- Sarangesa seineri Strand, 1909
- Sarangesa tertullianus (Fabricius, 1793)
- Sarangesa thecla (Plötz, 1879)
- Sarangesa tricerata (Mabille, 1891)
