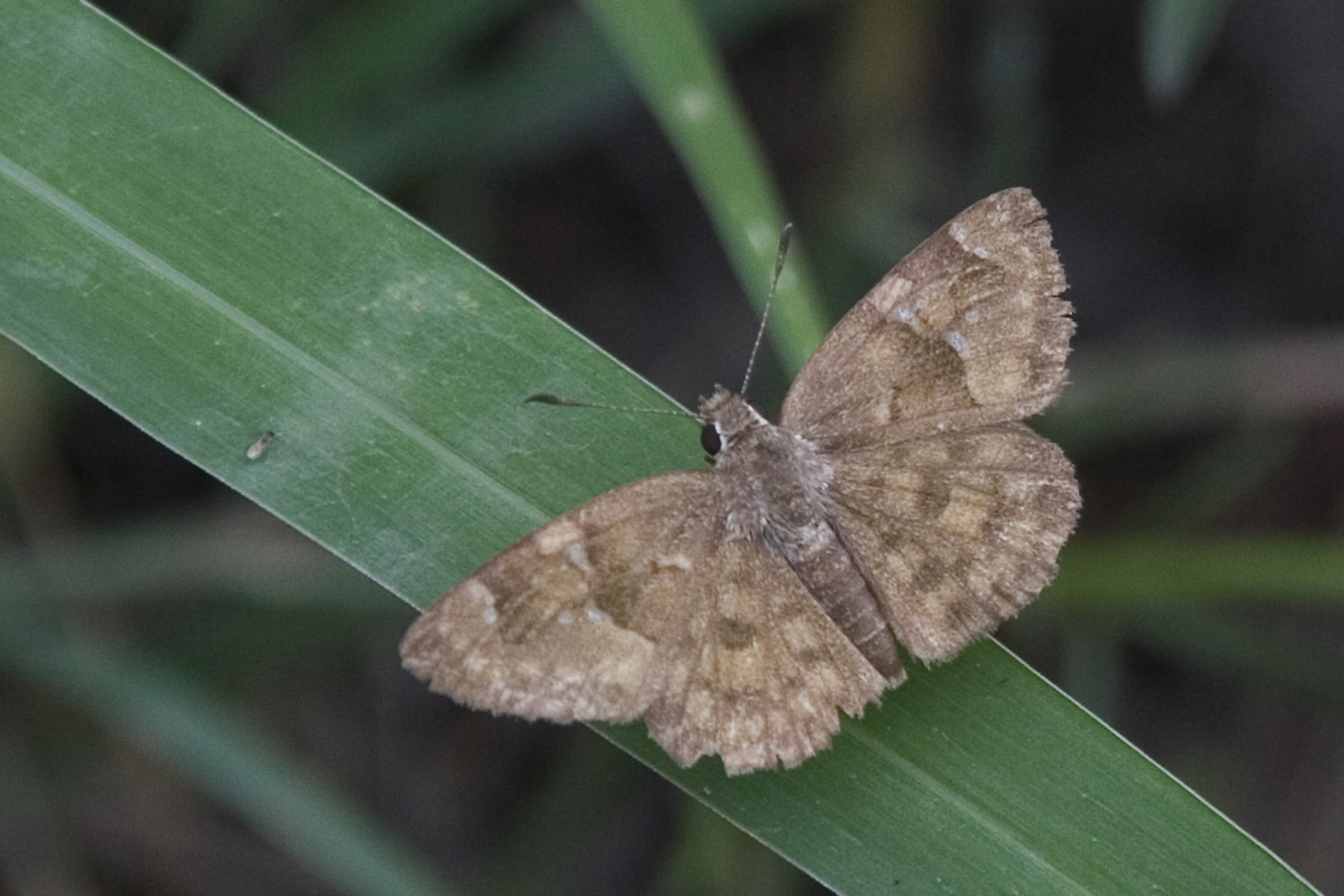

Scientific classification
- Kingdom: Animalia
- Phylum: Arthropoda
- Class: Insecta
- Order: Lepidoptera
- Family: Hesperiidae
- Genus: Sarangesa
- Species: S. phidyle

Binomial name
- Sarangesa phidyle (Walker, 1870)

Synonyms
- Cyclopides phidyle Walker, 1870; Achlyodes besa Mabille, 1891; Sape eliminata Holland, 1896; Sarangesa eliminata; Sarangesa eliminata deserticola Rebel, 1907; Sarangesa phidyle f. varia Evans, 1937

= Sarangesa phidyle =

Species of butterfly

Sarangesa phidyle, also known as the orange flat or small elfin, is a species of butterfly in the family Hesperiidae. It is found from Botswana, south-west Africa, Saudi Arabia, Sudan. In South Africa it is found from the eastern Cape to Eswatini, KwaZulu-Natal, Mpumalanga and the Limpopo Province, the North West Province and Gauteng.

The wingspan is 26–38 mm. Adults are on wing year-round, although they are scarcer in winter and the dry season.

The larvae feed on Barleria and Peristrophe species (including Peristrophe hensii).
