= Sarangesa ruona =

Scientific classification
- Kingdom: Animalia
- Phylum: Arthropoda
- Class: Insecta
- Order: Lepidoptera
- Family: Hesperiidae
- Genus: Sarangesa
- Species: S. ruona

Binomial name
- Sarangesa ruona Evans, 1937

Species of butterfly

Sarangesa ruona, commonly known as the Ruona elfin, is a species of butterfly in the family Hesperiidae. In South Africa, it is found in thickly wooded savanna and lowland forest in the Maputaland area of KwaZulu-Natal and the north-western parts of the Limpopo Province lowlands east of the Wolkberg and north and east of the Soutpansberg. It is also present in Zimbabwe.

The wingspan is 32–42 mm for males and 40–43 mm for females. Adults are on wing from September to May. There are multiple generations per year.
