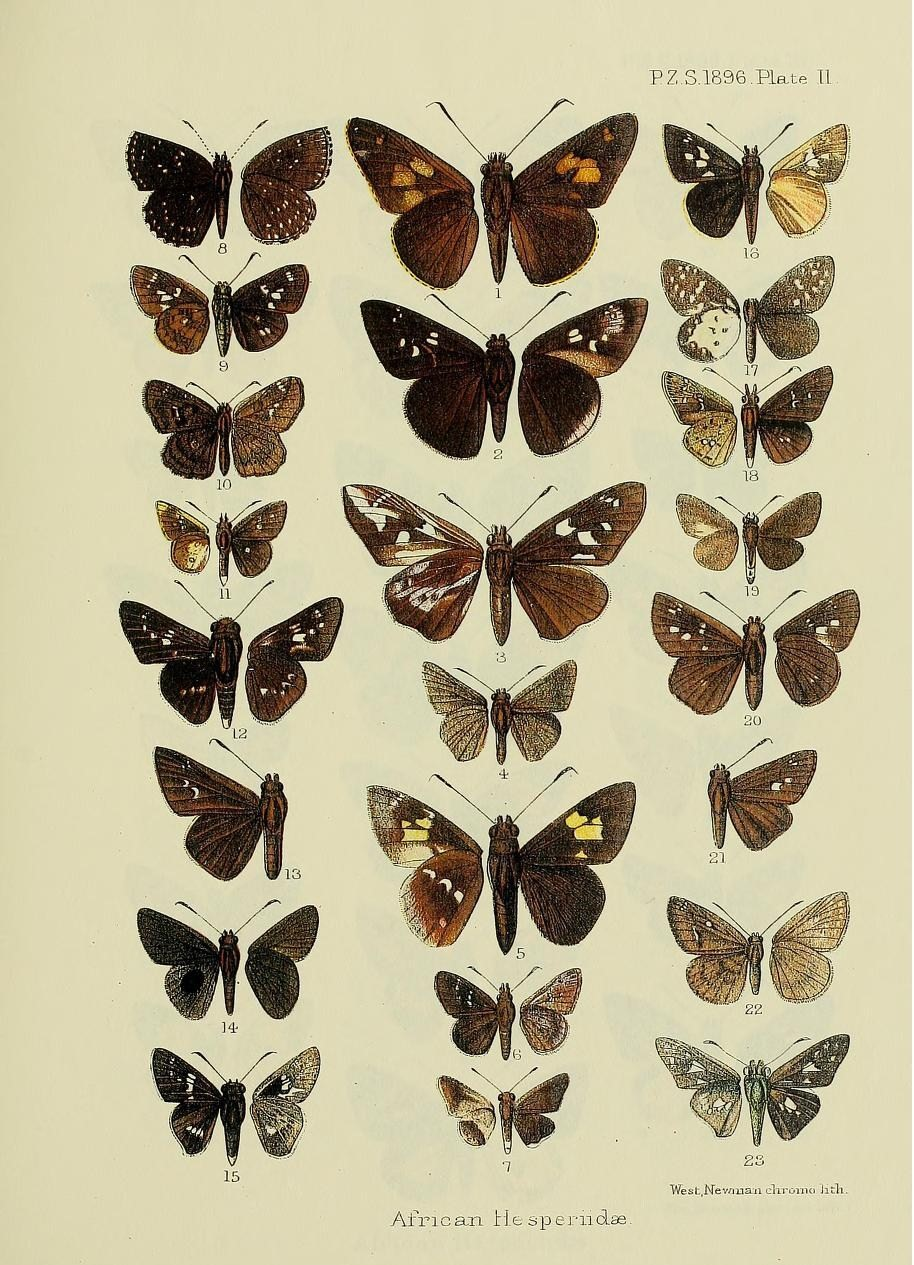
- Sarangesa astrigera figure 8

Scientific classification
- Kingdom: Animalia
- Phylum: Arthropoda
- Class: Insecta
- Order: Lepidoptera
- Family: Hesperiidae
- Genus: Sarangesa
- Species: S. astrigera

Binomial name
- Sarangesa astrigera Butler, 1894

Synonyms
- Sarangesa neavei Riley, 1921

= Sarangesa astrigera =

White-speckled elfin

Species of butterfly

Sarangesa astrigera, commonly known as the white-speckled elfin, is a species of butterfly in the family Hesperiidae. It is mostly found in Uganda, Tanzania, the Democratic Republic of the Congo (Katanga Province), Zambia, Malawi and northern Zimbabwe. The habitat consists of Brachystegia woodland.

Adults are on wing year round. There are distinct seasonal forms.
