= Alenia namaqua =

Scientific classification
- Kingdom: Animalia
- Phylum: Arthropoda
- Class: Insecta
- Order: Lepidoptera
- Family: Hesperiidae
- Genus: Alenia
- Species: A. namaqua

Binomial name
- Alenia namaqua Vári, 1974

Species of butterfly

Alenia namaqua, the Namaqua dancer or Namaqua sandman, is a species of butterfly of the family Hesperiidae. It is only known from Namaqualand in the Northern Cape of South Africa, from Calvinia north through Kamiensberg into Namibia.

The wingspan is 21–26 mm for males and 26–29 mm for females. Adults are on wing from September to November. There is one generation per year.

The larvae feed on Blepharis capensis.
