= Sarangesa pandaensis =

Scientific classification
- Kingdom: Animalia
- Phylum: Arthropoda
- Class: Insecta
- Order: Lepidoptera
- Family: Hesperiidae
- Genus: Sarangesa
- Species: S. pandaensis

Binomial name
- Sarangesa pandaensis Joicey & Talbot, 1921

Synonyms
- Sarangesa pandaensis f. lucia Evans, 1937

Species of butterfly

Sarangesa pandaensis is a species of butterfly in the family Hesperiidae. It is found in Angola, the Democratic Republic of the Congo and Zambia. The habitat consists of Brachystegia woodland.

== Subspecies ==
- Sarangesa pandaensis pandaensis - Angola, southern Democratic Republic of Congo
- Sarangesa pandaensis deningi Evans, 1956 - northern Zambia
