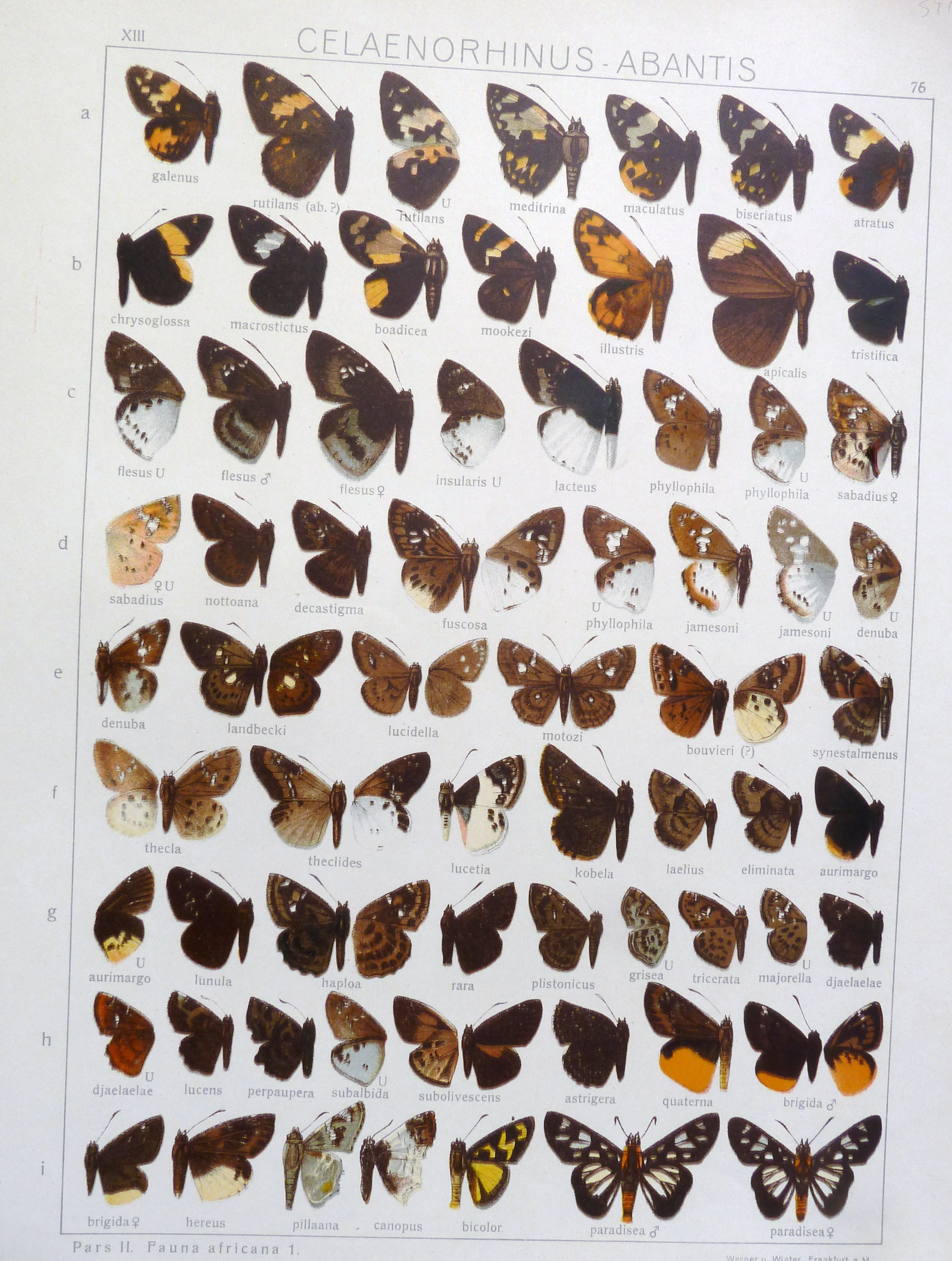
- as grisea Hewitson g

Scientific classification
- Kingdom: Animalia
- Phylum: Arthropoda
- Clade: Pancrustacea
- Class: Insecta
- Order: Lepidoptera
- Family: Hesperiidae
- Genus: Sarangesa
- Species: S. tertullianus

Binomial name
- Sarangesa tertullianus (Fabricius, 1793)

Synonyms
- List: Hesperia tertullianus Fabricius, 1793; Pterygospidea grisea Hewitson, 1878; Hyda micacea Mabille, 1890; Sarangesa (Hyda) micacea ab. unipuncta Strand, 1913

= Sarangesa tertullianus =

Species of butterfly

Sarangesa tertullianus, commonly known as the blue-dusted elfin, is a species of butterfly in the family Hesperiidae. It is found in Guinea, Sierra Leone, Liberia, Ivory Coast, Ghana, Togo, Nigeria, Cameroon, Gabon, the Republic of the Congo, the Democratic Republic of the Congo and Uganda (from the western part of the country to Bwamba). The habitat consists of forest edges and secondary growth near forests.

Adult males are attracted to flowers and bird droppings and mud-puddle.

Torben Larsen developed a species numbering system for his 2005 publication Butterflies of West Africa. This species is #1247. The 'Larsen' numbers have since been used with permission in A Sharp Eye on Butterflies of Ghana.
