= Sarangesa penningtoni =

Scientific classification
- Kingdom: Animalia
- Phylum: Arthropoda
- Clade: Pancrustacea
- Class: Insecta
- Order: Lepidoptera
- Family: Hesperiidae
- Genus: Sarangesa
- Species: S. penningtoni

Binomial name
- Sarangesa penningtoni Evans, 1951

Species of butterfly

Sarangesa penningtoni is a species of butterfly in the family Hesperiidae. It is found in northern Zambia.
