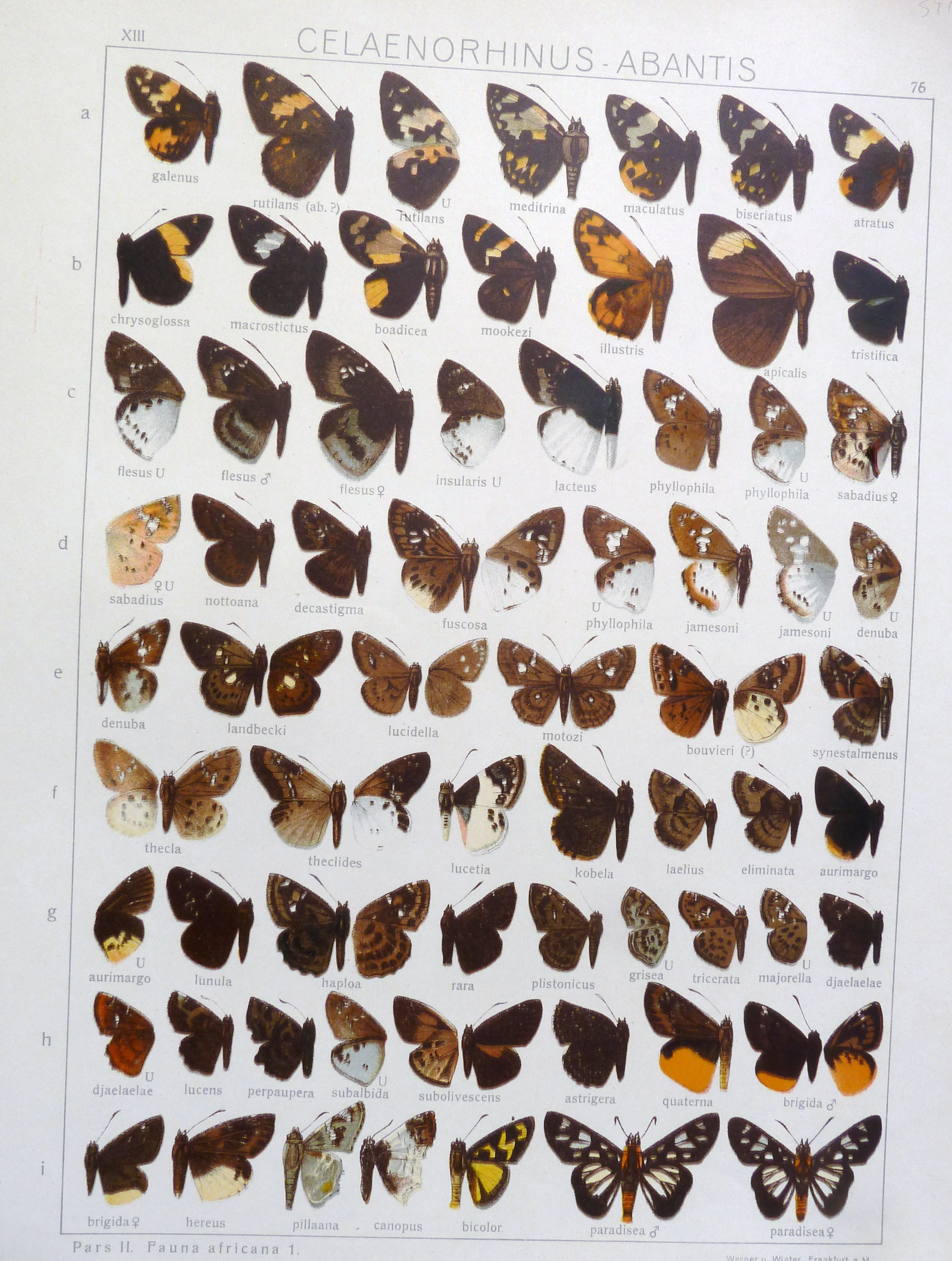

Scientific classification
- Kingdom: Animalia
- Phylum: Arthropoda
- Class: Insecta
- Order: Lepidoptera
- Family: Hesperiidae
- Genus: Apallaga
- Species: A. rutilans

Binomial name
- Apallaga rutilans (Mabille, 1877)

Synonyms
- List: Plesioneura rutilans Mabille, 1877; Pterygospidea tergemira Hewitson, 1877; Tagiades woermanni Plötz, 1879; Celaenorrhinus rutilans (Mabille, 1877)

= Apallaga rutilans =

Large sprite

Species of butterfly

Apallaga rutilans, commonly known as the large sprite, is a species of butterfly in the family Hesperiidae. It is found in Guinea, Sierra Leone, Ivory Coast, Ghana, Nigeria (the Cross River loop), Cameroon, Bioko, Gabon, the Republic of the Congo, the Central African Republic and the Democratic Republic of the Congo. The habitat primarily consists of forests.
