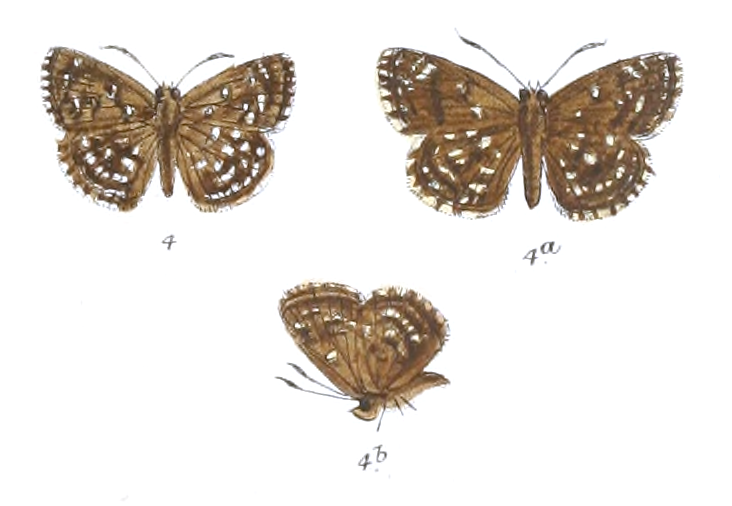

Scientific classification
- Kingdom: Animalia
- Phylum: Arthropoda
- Class: Insecta
- Order: Lepidoptera
- Family: Hesperiidae
- Genus: Sarangesa
- Species: S. sati

Binomial name
- Sarangesa sati de Nicéville, 1891

= Sarangesa sati =

Species of butterfly

Sarangesa sati, commonly known as the tiny flat, is a species of butterfly in the family Hesperiidae. It is endemic to the Kutch district of India. The species is alternatively listed as a race or subspecies of Sarangesa purendra.
