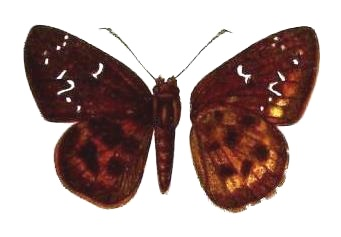

Scientific classification
- Kingdom: Animalia
- Phylum: Arthropoda
- Class: Insecta
- Order: Lepidoptera
- Family: Hesperiidae
- Genus: Sarangesa
- Species: S. lunula

Binomial name
- Sarangesa lunula H. H. Druce, 1910

= Sarangesa lunula =

Species of butterfly

Sarangesa lunula is a species of butterfly in the family Hesperiidae. It is found in the Democratic Republic of the Congo.
