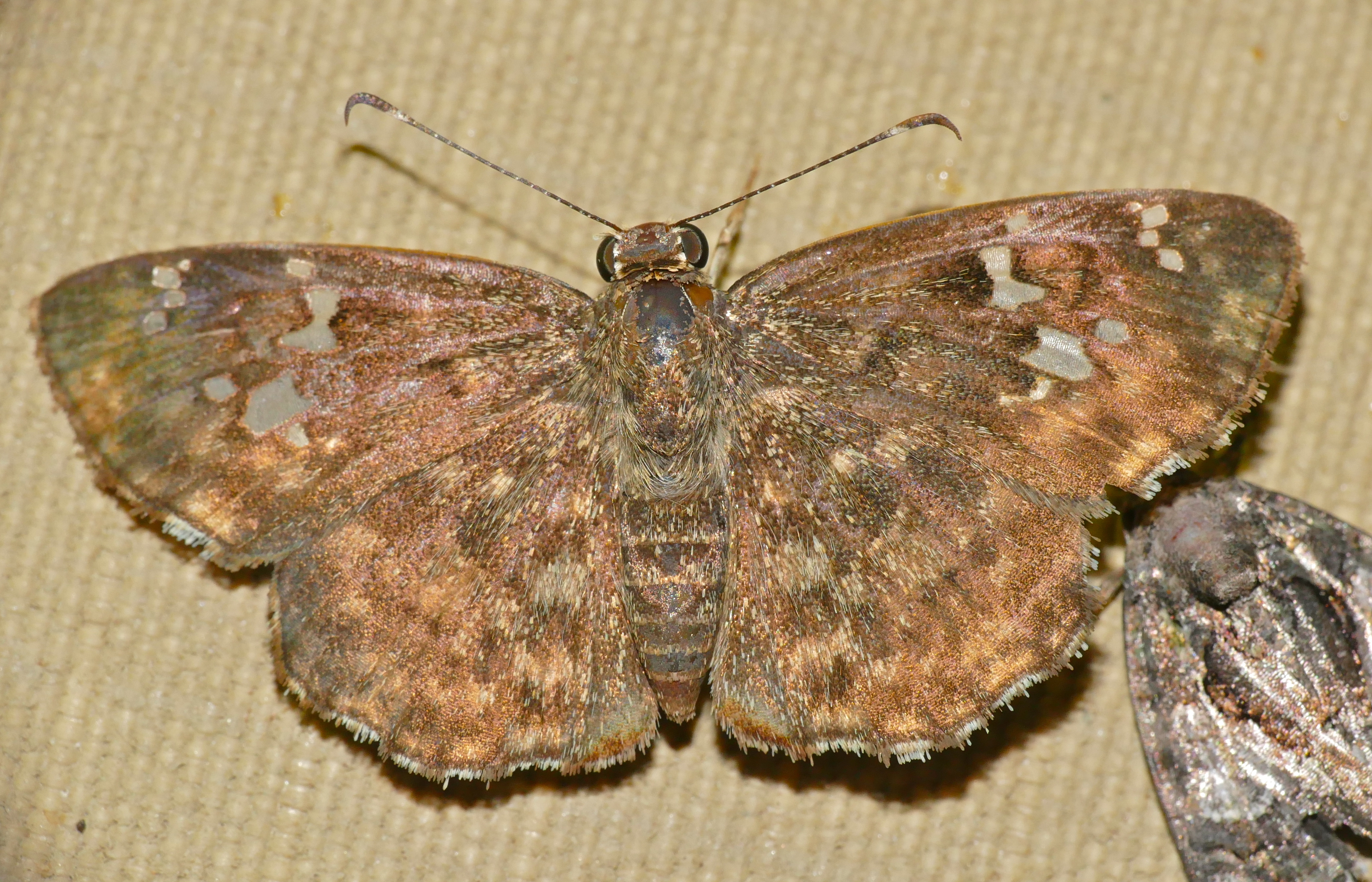

Scientific classification
- Kingdom: Animalia
- Phylum: Arthropoda
- Class: Insecta
- Order: Lepidoptera
- Family: Hesperiidae
- Genus: Sarangesa
- Species: S. seineri

Binomial name
- Sarangesa seineri Strand, 1909

Synonyms
- Sarangesa seineri tanga Evans, 1937

= Sarangesa seineri =

Dusted elfin

Species of butterfly

Sarangesa seineri, also known as the dusted elfin or dark elfin, is a species of butterfly in the family Hesperiidae. It is found in South Africa (Natal, Transvaal), Botswana and from Zimbabwe to Kenya and the DRC.

The wingspan is 36–38 mm for males and 38–40 mm for females. Adults are on wing year-round, although they are scarcer in winter and the dry season.

The larvae feed on Peristrophe hensii.

== Subspecies ==
- Sarangesa seineri seineri – Kenya to Malawi, Zambia, DRC: Katanga, Angola, Mozambique, Zimbabwe, Botswana, northern Namibia, South Africa: north of Soutpansberg in Limpopo to northern Gauteng and northern Mpumalanga
- Sarangesa seineri durbana Evans, 1937 – Eswatini, KwaZulu-Natal and Mpumalanga
