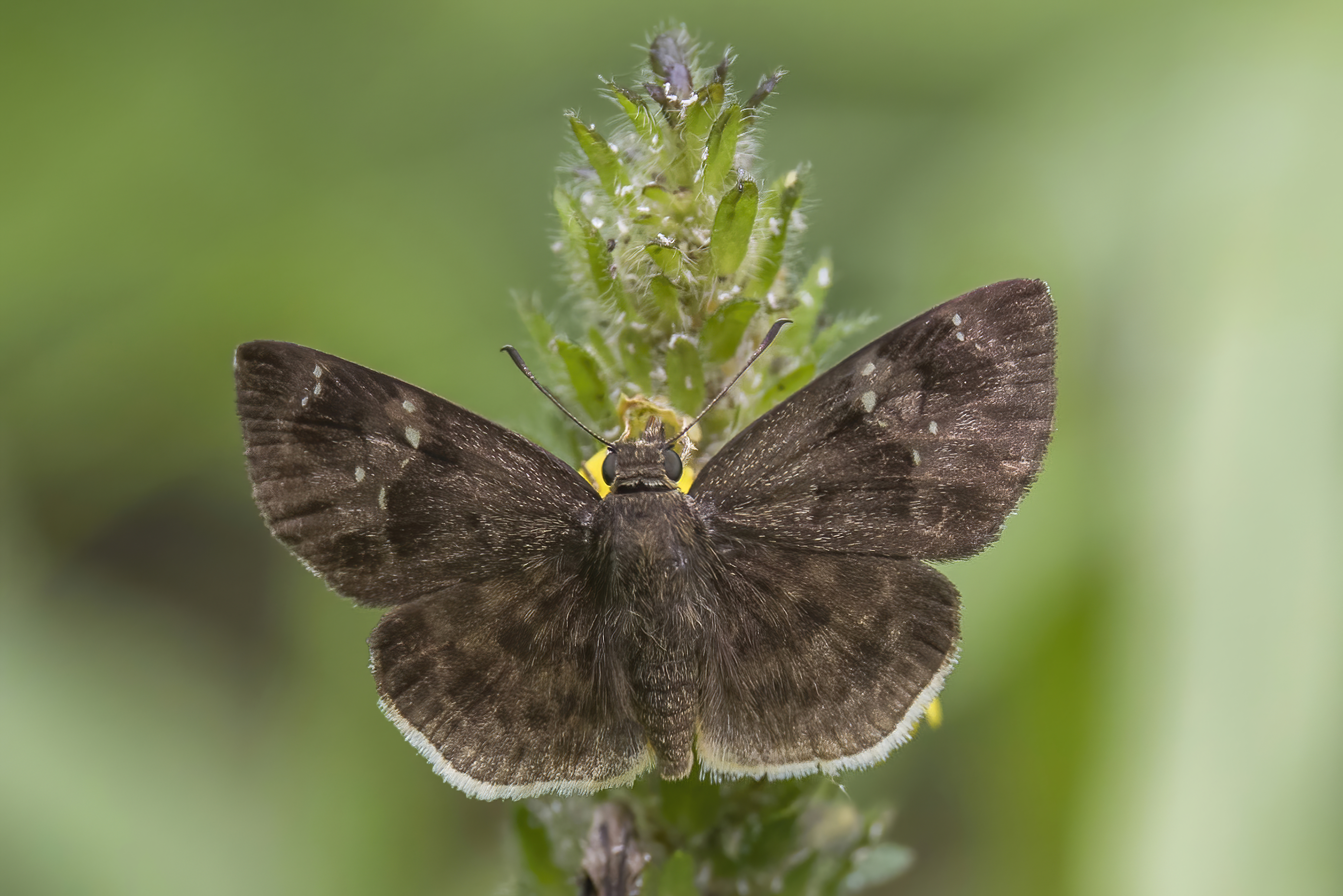
- male in Ghana

Scientific classification
- Kingdom: Animalia
- Phylum: Arthropoda
- Clade: Pancrustacea
- Class: Insecta
- Order: Lepidoptera
- Family: Hesperiidae
- Genus: Sarangesa
- Species: S. bouvieri

Binomial name
- Sarangesa bouvieri (Mabille, 1877)

Synonyms
- Pterygospidea bouvieri Mabille, 1877; Antigonus philotimus Plötz, 1879

= Sarangesa bouvieri =

Bouvier's elfin

Species of butterfly

Sarangesa bouvieri, commonly known as Bouvier's elfin, is a species of butterfly in the family Hesperiidae. It is found in Guinea, Sierra Leone, Liberia, Ivory Coast, Ghana, Togo, Nigeria, Cameroon, Gabon, Angola, Uganda, western Kenya and north-western Tanzania. The habitat consists of dry forests and successional habitats.

Adults are attracted to flowers.

The larvae feed on Acanthaceae species.

Torben Larsen developed a species numbering system for his 2005 publication Butterflies of West Africa. This species is #1251. The 'Larsen' numbers have since been used with permission in A Sharp Eye on Butterflies of Ghana.
