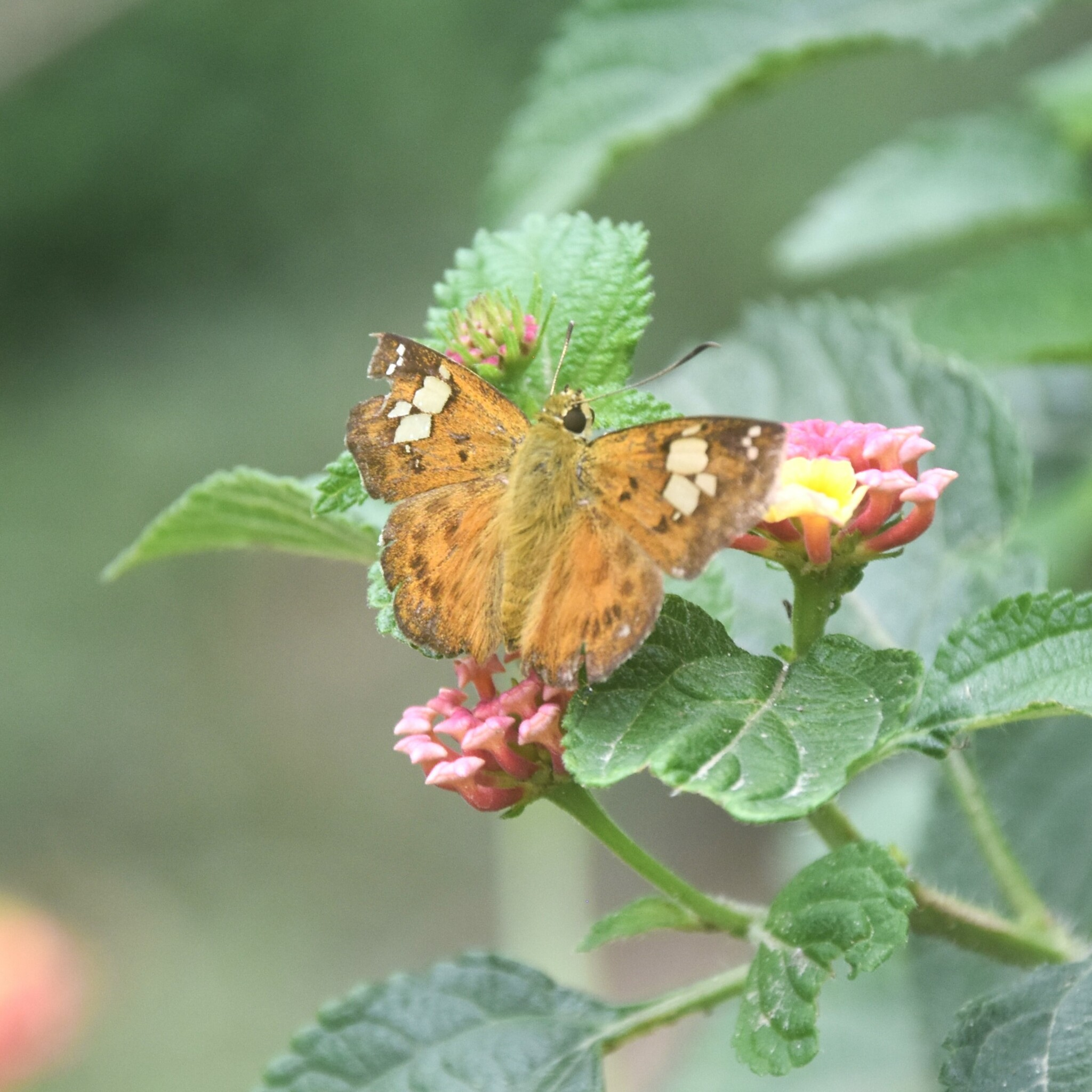

Scientific classification
- Kingdom: Animalia
- Phylum: Arthropoda
- Clade: Pancrustacea
- Class: Insecta
- Order: Lepidoptera
- Family: Hesperiidae
- Genus: Pseudocoladenia
- Species: P. fatih

Binomial name
- Pseudocoladenia fatih Kollar, 1844

Synonyms
- Hesperia fatih; Plesioneura fatih; Coladenia fatih; Coladenia dan fatih; Pseudocoladenia dan fatih

= Pseudocoladenia fatih =

Species of butterfly

Pseudocoladenia fatih, also known as the West Himalayan pied flat, is a butterfly in the family Hesperiidae. It is found from Kashmir to Nepal. It was described by Vincenz Kollar in 1844. This species is monotypic.

The upperside is variable, but is usually rufous-brown. There are large whitish or yellowish discal spots on the upperside forewing. There are dark discal spots on the underside and upperside hindwing, spaced with light-brown.
