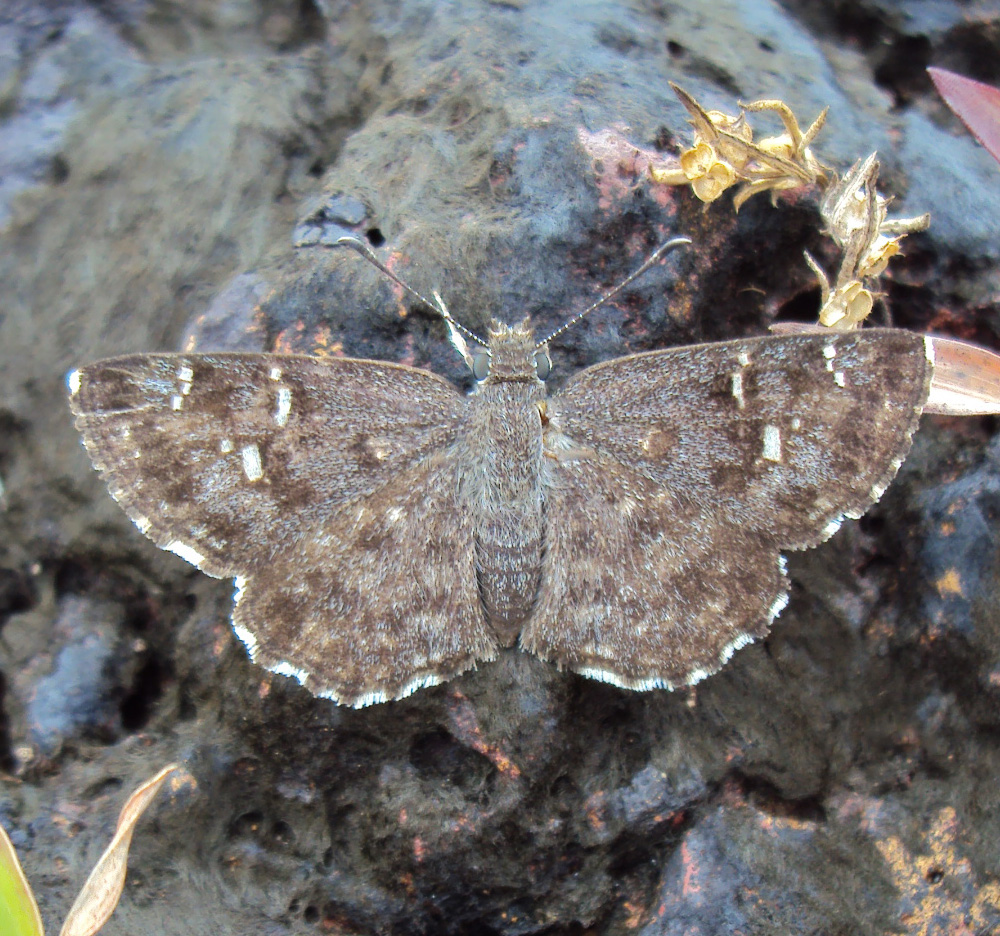
- From Madayipara, India

Scientific classification
- Kingdom: Animalia
- Phylum: Arthropoda
- Class: Insecta
- Order: Lepidoptera
- Family: Hesperiidae
- Genus: Sarangesa
- Species: S. purendra

Binomial name
- Sarangesa purendra Moore, 1882

Synonyms
- Pyrgus purendra; Sarangesa hopkinsi Evans, 1921

= Sarangesa purendra =

Spotted small flat

Species of butterfly

Sarangesa purendra, commonly known as the spotted small flat, is a species of butterfly in the family Hesperiidae.

== Subspecies ==
- Sarangesa purendra purendra Moore, 1882 - Himachal Pradesh to Uttarakhand
- Sarangesa purendra hopkinsi Evans, 1921 - Karnataka and Tamil Nadu
- Sarangesa purendra pandra Evans, 1949 - Kerala to Rajasthan
- Sarangesa purendra sati de Nicéville, 1891 - Gujarat (Kutch)

== Description ==
In 1865, Frederic Moore described this butterfly as:

Upperside greyer than in S. dasahara, with paler mottled markings: fore wing with a semidiaphanous white continuous streak across the cell near its end, a continuous small spot above it, three small conjoined spots before the apex, and three on the disk, the middle discal spot large and quadrate. Cilia alternated with grey. Underside paler; fore wing marked as above, and with an additional small white lower spot on the disk, and a basal streak below the cell: hind wing with a small whitish spot in middle of the cell, and a less distinct discal curved series.

— Frederic Moore

== Life history ==
The larvae of Sarangesa purendra hopkinsi feed on Asystasia and Blepharis asperrima. They also feed on Lepidagathis cristata but need confirmation. Whereas the Sarangesa purendra pandra feed on Lepidagathis keralensis.
