= Alenia (butterfly) =

Scientific classification
- Kingdom: Animalia
- Phylum: Arthropoda
- Class: Insecta
- Order: Lepidoptera
- Family: Hesperiidae
- Tribe: Celaenorrhinini
- Genus: Alenia; Evans, 1935

Genus of butterflies

Alenia is an Afrotropical genus of skippers in the family Hesperiidae.

== Species ==
- Alenia namaqua Vári, 1974
- Alenia sandaster (Trimen, 1868)
